= List of Kawasaki motorcycles =

This is a list of Kawasaki motorcycles designed and/or manufactured by Kawasaki Motors and its predecessors.

== Streetbikes ==
- A1 Samurai 250
- A7 Avenger 350
- Agila HD 125
- B1
- B85
- B85M
- D1 100
- ER-5
- Fury 125
- GTO 125
- HD-1
- HD-II
- HD-X
- HD-III
- H1 Mach III 500
- H2 Mach IV 750
- KB100 RTZ
- KH500
- KH400
- KH125
- KSR110
- S1 Mach I 250
- S2 Mach II 350
- Versys
- Z125 Pro
- Z250SL
- Z250
- Z750
- Z800
- Z900
- Z1000
- ZRX1200R
- ZZR250
- ZZR400
- ZZR600
- ZZR1100
- ZZR1200
- ZZR1400

=== Sport bikes ===
- KRR ZX150 (Ninja 150RR)
- Ninja 250R (EX250, GPZ250, ZZ-R250)
- Ninja 300 (EX300)
- Ninja 400R (EX400)
- Ninja 500R (EX500, GPZ500S, ZZ-R500)
- Ninja 650R (ER-6F)
- Ninja 1000
- Ninja ZX-6R
- Ninja ZX-10R
- Ninja ZX-12R

=== Sport-Touring ===
- ZG-1000 Concours / GTR1000
- Concours 14 / 1400GTR
- Voyager 1700

=== Cruiser ===
- 454 LTD
- Eliminator
- Estrella
- Vulcan 2000
- Vulcan 1700
- Vulcan 1600 Nomad
- Vulcan 1600 Classic
- Vulcan 1500 Drifter
- Vulcan 900 Classic
- Vulcan 800 Classic
- Vulcan 800 Drifter
- Vulcan 750
- Vulcan 700
- Vulcan S650
- Vulcan 500 LTD
- Vulcan 400 Classic
- Vulcan 400 Drifter

=== Scooters ===
- Epsilon 250
- J125
- J300
- J300 Special Edition

== Off road ==
- KV75
- KD100M
- KDX50
- KDX80
- KDX125
- KDX175
- KDX200
- KDX220
- KDX250
- KDX400
- KDX420
- KDX450
- KLX110
- KLX125
- KLX125L
- KLX140
- KLX150
- KLX230
- KLX250
- KLX300R
- KLX400R
- KLX450R
- KLX650R
- KMX 125
- KMX 200
- KT250
- KX60
- KX65
- KX80
- KX85
- KX100
- KX112
- KX125
- KX250
- KX327
- KX420
- KX500
- KX250F
- KX450F

== Dual purpose ==
- F1TR
- F2TR
- G4/KV100
- G5
- GA5A
- KE100
- KE125
- KE175
- KL250C
- KLE400
- KLE500
- KLR250
- KLR600
- KLR650
- KLX230R
- KLX230S
- KLX250S
- KLX300R
- KLX400SR
- KLX650C
- KM100
- Super Sherpa
- J1TR

== Electric / Hybrid ==
- Ninja e-1
- Z e-1
- Ninja 7 Hybrid
- Z7 Hybrid

== Special purpose ==
- Kawasaki police motorcycles

== Models no longer in production ==
- A1 Samurai
- A5 Samurai
- A7 Avenger
- A10 Samurai
- AE50
- AE80
- AR50
- AR80
- AR80K
- B7 Pet
- B8
- B8M Red-Tank Furore
- C2SS & C2TR
- G1M
- G31M Centurion
- HD-III
- G4TR G4 'Trail Boss'
- KV100
- F11M
- F21M "Green Streak"
- F3 Bushwhacker
- F4 Sidewinder
- F5 Bighorn
- F6 Enduro
- F7 Enduro
- F8 Bison
- F81M "Green Streak"
- F9 Bighorn
- ER500A/D
- Ninja ZXR 250 / ZX-2R
- Ninja ZXR 400
- Ninja ZXR 750 / ZX-7
- Ninja ZX-7R / ZX-7RR
- Ninja ZX-9R
- Ninja 1000R
- Ninja ZX-10 / ZZR-1000
- Ninja ZX-11 / ZZR 1100
- ZZR1200 / ZZ-R1200
- GPZ750
- GPZ1100B1/B2
- GPZ1100E1/E2
- GPZ250R
- GPZ400R
- GPZ305
- GPZ750 Turbo
- Ninja GPZ900R
- Ninja 600R
- ZX600A
- 454 LTD
- S1 Mach I
- S2 Mach II
- S3 400
- H1 Mach III
- H2 Mach IV
- KR250
- KH125
- AR125
- Kaze ZX130
- ZG1200 Voyager XII
- ZN1300 Voyager XIII
- KE100
- KE125
- KL250
- KR-1/KR-1S/KR-1R
- KH250/400/500
- Z500/Z550
- Z750 twin
- Z1/KZ900
- Z1R
- Z750RS Z2
- KZ750L3
- KZ750L4
- KZ750N - Spectre
- KZ200
- KZ305CSR
- KZ400/Z400
- KZ440/Z440
- KZ350
- Z650
- Z1000-H
- Z1000-ST
- KZ1300
- ZL900A Eliminator
- ZL600A Eliminator
- ZN700LTD
- ZR-7
- ZEPHYR 750
- ZR-1100
- KSR II
- W650
- Voyager
- KZ-1000
- KZ-1100
- KZ900 A4
- F1TR
- F2TR
- J1TR
- Kaze
- Kaze-R
- Kaze-VR

== ATV / Quad ==
- Aeon Cobra
- Bayou 185
- Bayou 220
- Bayou 250
- Bayou 300
- Bayou 400
- Brute Force 300
- Brute Force 650
- Brute Force 750
- Duckster 200
- KFX 50 (re-badged Suzuki LT-A50 until 2006, now an independent design)
- KFX 80 (re-badged Suzuki LT80)
- KFX 90
- KFX 400 (re-badged Suzuki LT-Z400)
- KFX 450R
- KFX 700 V-Force
- KLT 110
- KLT 160
- KLT 185
- KLT 200
- KLT 250
- Lakota 300
- Lakota Sport 300
- Mojave 110
- Mojave 250
- Prairie 250 (based on the KLT 250)
- Prairie 300
- Prairie 360
- Prairie 400 (first adult-sized ATV with a fully automatic transmission)
- Prairie 650 (first production ATV with a V-twin engine)
- Prairie 700
- Tecate 250
- Tecate-4 250

== Road racing motorcycles ==
- KZ1000S1
- Ninja ZX-RR
- KR250
- KR350
- KR500
- KR750
- KR1000
- KR-2
- KR-3
- A1R
- A7R
- H1-R
- H1-RW
- H2-R
- X-09
- F5-R
- 602S
