= Kawasaki Motors Philippines =

Kawasaki Motors Philippines Corporation
- Type: Subsidiary of Kawasaki Heavy Industries
- Industry: Motorcycles
- Founded: 1974
- Headquarters: Km. 23 East Service Road, Bo.Cupang, Alabang, Muntinlupa, Philippines
- Key people: Isao Sudo, President
- Products: Commuter bikes and leisure bikes, Bajaj motorcycles, Modenas scooter and apparel
- Parent: Kawasaki Heavy Industries (Kawasaki Motors)
- Website: kawasaki.ph

Kawasaki Motors Philippines Corporation (KMPC or Kawasaki Philippines) is a subsidiary of Kawasaki Heavy Industries, Ltd. under the motorcycle unit. It manufactures motorcycle/motorcycle parts, and bicycle/bicycle parts.

Kawasaki Philippines is also the official distributor and assembler of Bajaj and Modenas in the Philippines.

== Background ==
Kawasaki Motors Philippines Corporation, located in Muntinlupa, Metro Manila, is in charge of production and distribution of Kawasaki Motors in the Philippines.

Motorcycles and motorcycle-operated motor tricycles are essential means of transportation for many Filipinos, especially in smaller cities such as Laoag City and Puerto Princesa, as well as tourist destinations such as Boracay.

== Products ==
=== Current lineup ===
- Barako III FI (2022–present)
- KLX 150
- KLX 150L
- KLX 150BF
- Ninja 400
- Z400
- Ninja ZX-25R
- Versys 650 (LE 650E)
- Z650
- Ninja 650
- Ninja ZX-6R

They also assemble (knock-down kits) the following Bajaj models:

- CT100 (2006–present) - new engine 4 stroke business model
- CT100B (2017–present) - new engine
- CT125 (2018–present) - 4-stroke 125-cc business model
- CT150 (2019–present) - New engine
- Rouser NS200 (2015–present) - 4-stroke 200cc - Standard model
- Rouser RS200 (2017–present) - 4-stroke 199.5cc - Standard model
- Rouser NS160 (2018–present) - 4-stroke 160.3cc - Standard model
- Rouser NS125 (2019–present) - 4-stroke 125cc
- Dominar 400UG (2021–present) - 4-stroke 400cc

Modenas Model:

- Brusky 125cc - (2024-present)-scooter

=== Discontinued products ===
- AR-80K Liquid Cooled (1996–1998)
- AR-80F Air Cooled
- Aura Classic
- Aura Nexus
- Fury and Fury R, 1st-2nd Gen (2009–2014) - 4-stroke 125cc
- B1-125 (1965–1972)
- HD-1 (197x-198x) - 2-stroke 100cc
- HD-IX (197x-199x) - 2-stroke 100cc
- HD-X (1982–2002) - 2-stroke 100cc
- HD-II (1978–1998)
- HD-III (1982–2007) - 2-stroke 125cc
  - Betamax (1982-1992)
  - San Ildefonso (1992-1993)
  - Kulog (1994-1995)
  - Kidlat/CDI 125 (1995-1997)
  - Zenki (1998-1999)
  - Olympic (2000-2001)
  - Brutus 140cc (2000-2005)
  - Palakol (2002-2003)
  - Tari (2004-2007)
- KE 100
- KMX 125 (199x-200x)
- KRR-150SSR (2003–2005)
- Leo Star 120SR/SSR - 2 stroke 120cc (2003-2006)
- Bajaj/Kawasaki Wind 125 (2005–2009) - 4-stroke 125cc
- Bajaj BYK (2005–2006) - 4-stroke 100cc
- Bajaj Caliber 115
- BC 125 (2008)
- Bajaj Discover 135 DTS-i (2009-2019)
- Bajaj Rouser 200 DTS-i (2009-2010)
- Bajaj Rouser 220 DTS-i (2010-2013)
- Discover 100 DTS-i (2013–present)
- CT150 (Boxer) (2013–2020) - 4-stroke 150cc - Business model
- Rouser 135LS (2011–2014) - 4 stroke 135cc - Standard model
- Rouser 180 DTS-i (2013–2018) - 4-stroke 180cc - Standard model
- CT100P - Limited version of CT100
  - Avenger 220 (2014–2016) - 4-stroke 220cc - Cruiser
- Fury (New Breed, 2015–2022) - 4-stroke 125cc - With electric start underbone model
- Fury RR (New Breed, 2015–2022) - 4-stroke 125cc - Mag wheel version plus rear disc brake, and manual hand clutch
- Curve(2009-2015) - 4-stroke 112cc - With electric starter scooter model
- Barako (2004–2012)
- Barako II (2013–2023) 4-stroke 177cc - Business model, available with Kick starter only model / Electric + Kick starter model
  - Tough and Powerful (2007)

== See also ==
- Kawasaki Heavy Industries Motorcycle & Engine
- Kawasaki Heavy Industries
- Kawasaki motorcycles
- List of Kawasaki motorcycles
