= V-twin engine =

Piston engine with two cylinders in "V" configuration

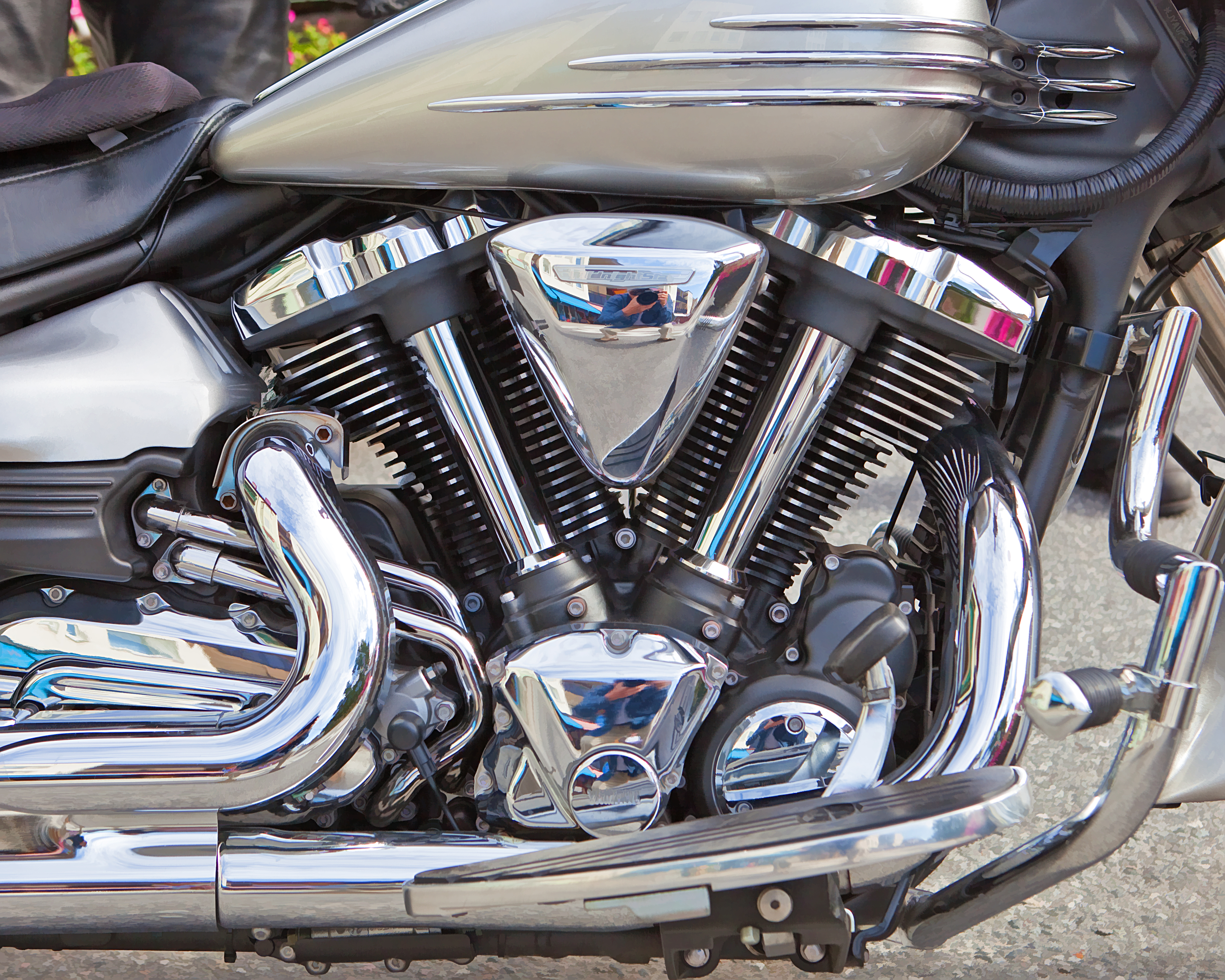
Yamaha XV1900A motorcycle engine

A V-twin engine, also called a V2 engine, is a two-cylinder piston engine where the cylinders are arranged in a V configuration and share a common crankshaft.

The V-twin is widely associated with motorcycles, primarily installed transversely, though also longitudinally. They are also used in a variety of other land, air, and marine vehicles, as well as industrial applications. The V-twin design dates back to the late 1880s.

== Origins ==
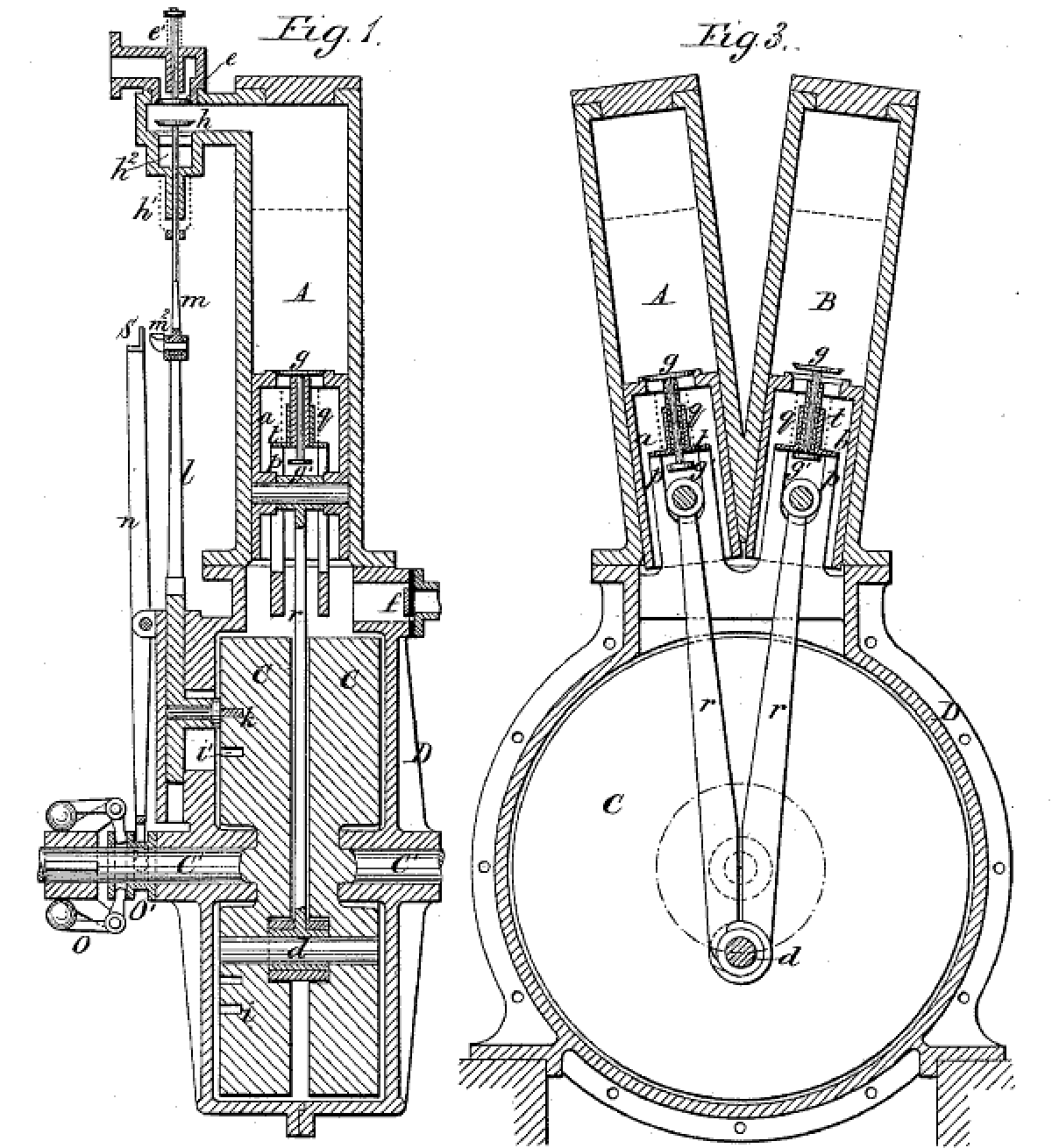
1889 Daimler V-twin engine

One of the first V-twin engines was built by Gottlieb Daimler in 1889. It was used as a stationary engine, for boats and in the Daimler Stahlradwagen ("steel-wheeled car"), Daimler's second car. The engine was also manufactured under licence in France by Panhard et Levassor.

An early V-twin engined motorcycle was produced in November 1902 by the Princeps AutoCar Company in the United Kingdom. The following year, V-twin motorcycles were produced by Eclipse Motor & Cycle Co in the United Kingdom (the XL-ALL model), Glenn Curtiss in the United States, and NSU Motorenwerke in Germany.

Peugeot, which had used Panhard-built Daimler V-twins in its first cars, began producing its own V-twin engines in the early 20th century. This Peugeot engine powered a Norton motorcycle that won the first Isle of Man TT race in 1907.

== Typical design ==
=== Crankshaft configuration ===
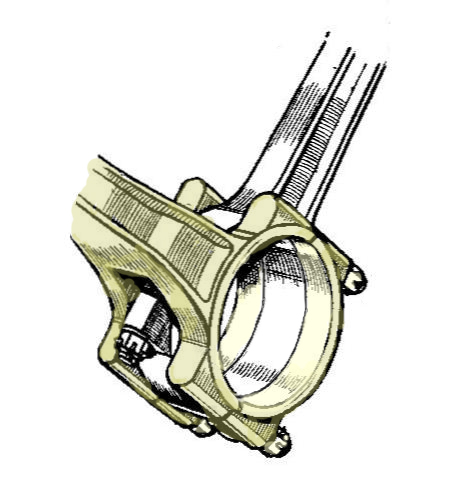
"Fork & blade" connecting rods

Most V-twin engines have a single crankpin, which is shared by both connecting rods. The connecting rods may sit side-by-side with offset cylinders, or have fork and blade connecting rods which avoids the twisting forces caused by having offset cylinders.

Some notable exceptions include a 180° crank pin offset used by the 1935 Moto Guzzi 500cc, a dual-crankpin configuration used by the 1983 Honda Shadow 750, and the 75° crank pin offset (45° offset in the United States) used by the 1987 Suzuki VX 800.

=== V angle ===
Although any 'V angle' (the angle between the two banks of cylinders) between zero and 180 degrees is theoretically possible for a V-twin engine, in practice angles smaller than 40 degrees are rarely used. The most common V angle for a V-twin engine is 90 degrees, which can achieve a perfect primary balance (if the correct counterweight is used) like most Ducatis, most Moto Guzzis, the Honda RC51, Suzuki TL1000S and TL1000R. However, this arrangement results in an uneven firing order, with the second cylinder firing 270 degrees after the first cylinder, then a 450 degrees interval until the first cylinder fires again. While the uneven firing order results in greater vibration, it also produces a distinctive sound that many riders appreciate. 90 degree engines are sometimes called L-twin (like the "L" in TL1000R or TL1000S) rather than V-twin.

When a V angle of less than 90 degrees is used, perfect primary balance can only be achieved if offset crankpins are used. If not, balance shafts are usually required to reduce the vibration. Vehicles which use engines with V angles of less than 90 degrees include:

- 20 degrees: 1889 Daimler Steel-wheel car
- 42 degrees: 1916–1923 Indian Powerplus, 1920–1949 Indian Scout, 1922–1953 Indian Chief
- 45 degrees: 1909–present Harley-Davidson V-twin, 1990–1997 Suzuki VX 800, 1985-2005 Suzuki VS series, 2001–present Suzuki Boulevard C50, 1985–2007 Honda VT1100
- 48 degrees: 2005–2012 Yamaha MT-01, 1999–present Yamaha XV1600A
- 50 degrees: 1919–1924 BSA Model E, 1924–1936 Brough Superior SS100, 1929–1940 Matchless Model X, 1936–1955 Vincent Rapide, all Victory Freedom engines
- 52 degrees: 1997–present Honda Shadow, 1987–2012 Honda Transalp, 1998–2013 Honda Deauville, 2002–2008 Honda VTX, 2004–2010 Kawasaki Vulcan 2000 series
- 54 degrees: 2008–present Suzuki Boulevard C109R, 2006–present Suzuki Boulevard M109R
- 55 degrees: 1985–2006 Kawasaki Vulcan 750, 2006–present Kawasaki Vulcan 900 Classic
- 60 degrees: 2001–2017 Harley-Davidson VRSC, 2014–2021 Harley-Davidson Street, 1998–2003 Aprilia RSV Mille, 1988–present Yamaha XV250, 2001–present Yamaha DragStar 250, 2015–present Indian Scout
- 70 degrees: 1982–1983 Yamaha XZ 550, 1988–1998 Suzuki RGV250, 1987–2004 Yamaha Virago 535, 1997–present Yamaha DragStar 650
- 72 degrees: 1974–1989 Moto Morini 350 & 500 V-twins Voxan 1997–2010
- 75 degrees: 2005–present Hyosung GT250, 2008–2015 KTM 1190 RC8, 1981–2007 Yamaha Virago, 1998–2008 Yamaha DragStar 1100
- 80 degrees: 1978–1983 Honda CX series, Rotax 810/660/490 engines

Vehicles which use engines with V angles of greater than 90 degrees include the 1934 Moto Guzzi 500cc (120 degrees) and the 1940–1948 Zündapp KS 750 (170 degrees).

== Motorcycles ==
As per other motor vehicles, the terms longitudinal engine and transverse engine are most often used to refer to the crankshaft orientation relative to the frame. However, some companies use the opposite terminology, stating that a "transverse" V-twin engine has the cylinders mounted on each side of the motorcycle (therefore with the crankshaft running in line with the frame) and that a "longitudinal" V-twin engine has the cylinders at the front and rear. The latter terminology is used by the Italian manufacturer Moto Guzzi.

To avoid such ambiguity, some people use descriptions of "transverse crankshaft engine", "longitudinal crankshaft engine", or "transversely mounted cylinders".

=== Transverse engine ===
The most common arrangement is to mount the engine with the crankshaft oriented transversely to the frame. The advantage of this mounting is that the width of the motorcycle can be smaller than a longitudinally-mounted V-twin. A disadvantage of this configuration for air-cooled engines is that the two cylinders receive different air-flows and cooling of the rear cylinder tends to be restricted (although the uneven cooling isn't as pronounced as a parallel-twin engine, where the inner faces of the cylinders are not exposed to any airflow). Some transverse V-twins use a single carburettor in the middle of the V-angle to feed both cylinders. While this avoids the need for two carburettors, it creates further cooling problems for the rear cylinder by placing its hot exhaust port and pipe at the back of the cylinder, where it may be exposed to less cooling airflow.

Transverse V-twin engines have been used by Harley-Davidson, Ducati and many recent Japanese motorcycles, such as the Suzuki SV650. Some Ducati V-twin engines have been marketed as "L-twin" engines, due to the front cylinder being horizontal and the rear cylinder being vertical, thus forming an "L" shape.

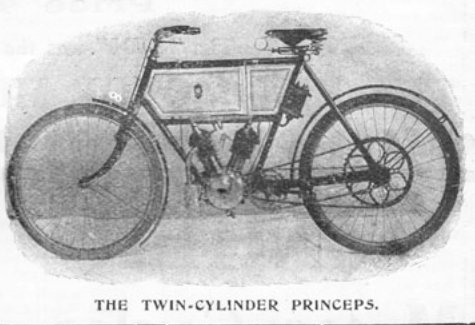
1902 Princeps V-Twin (air-cooled)

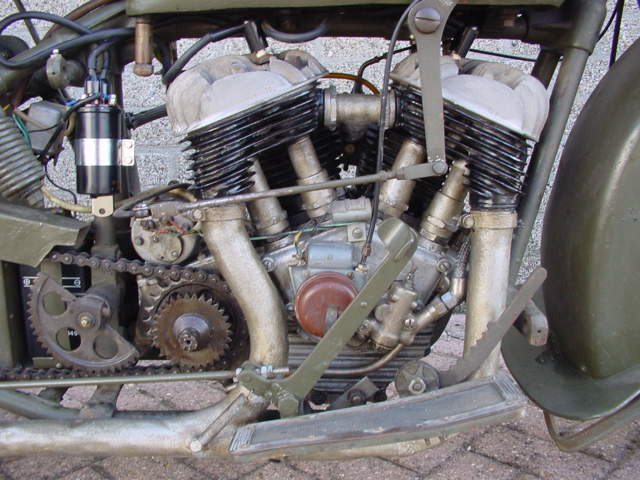
1933–1939 Sokół 1000 (air-cooled)

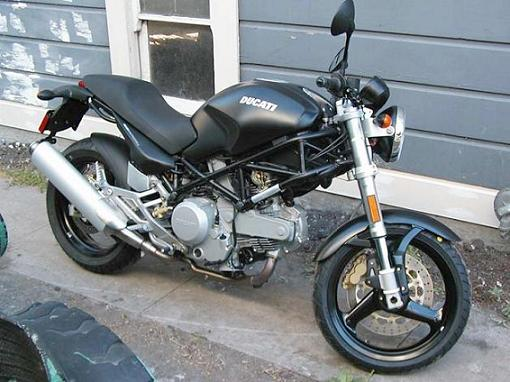
2002 Ducati Monster 620 (air-cooled)

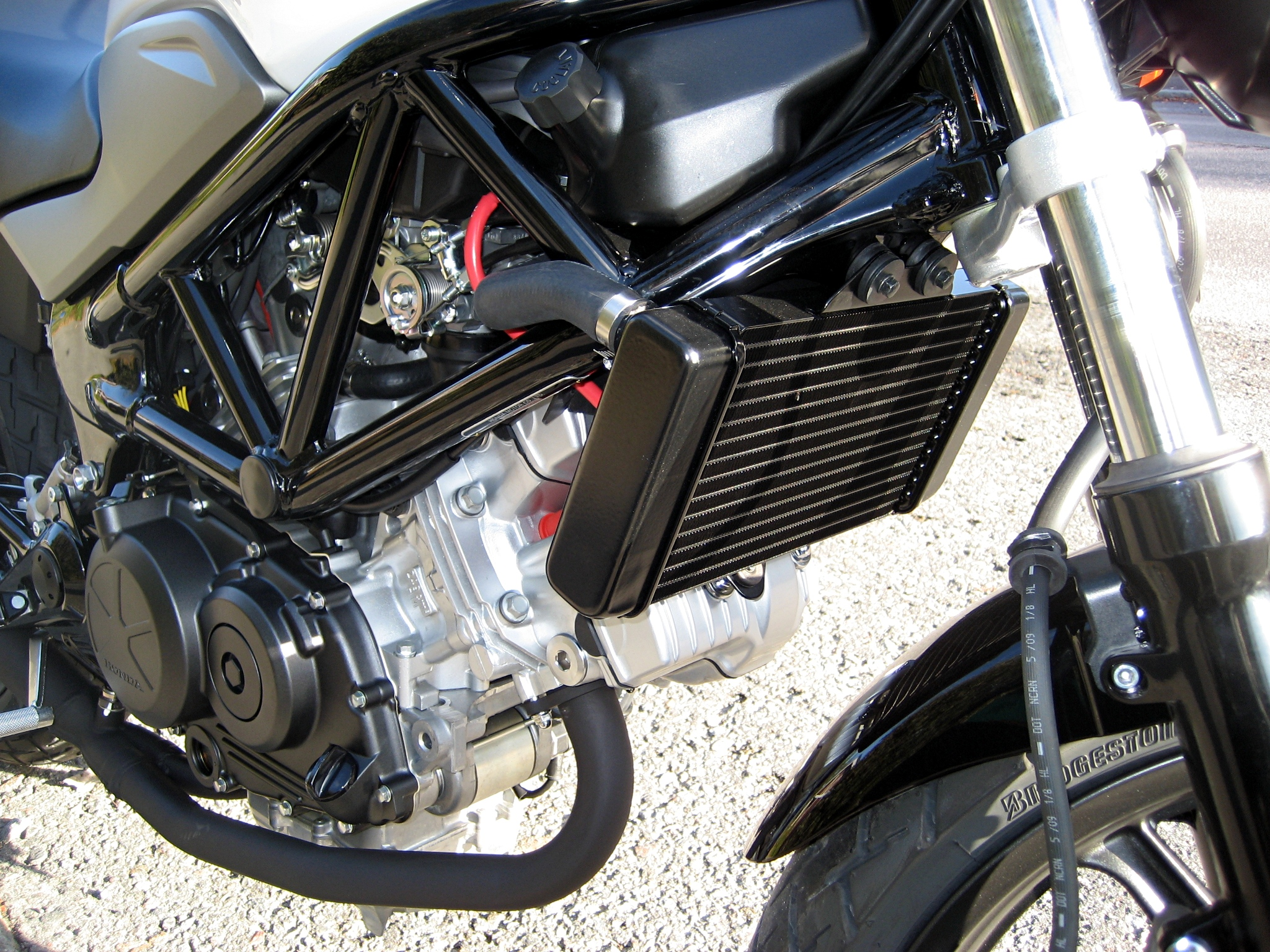
2009 Honda VTR250 (water-cooled)

=== Longitudinal engine ===
A less common arrangement is to mount the engine longitudinally. An advantage of this arrangement is that both cylinder heads can protrude into the air stream, so they can each receive the same amount of cooling (for air-cooled engines). Also, the transmission being located behind the engine is easier to fit within a typical motorcycle frame and, for shaft-drive motorcycles, a 90° bevel gear is not needed at the start of the driveshaft.

As per all longitudinal engines, a disadvantage is that the torque reaction will twist the motorcycle to one side (such as on sharp acceleration/deceleration or when opening the throttle in neutral) instead of shifting the weight balance between the front and rear wheels. However, many modern motorcycles reduce this effect by rotating flywheels or alternators in the opposite direction to that of the crankshaft.

Longitudinal V-twin engines have been used by the Honda CX series and several Moto Guzzi motorcycles.

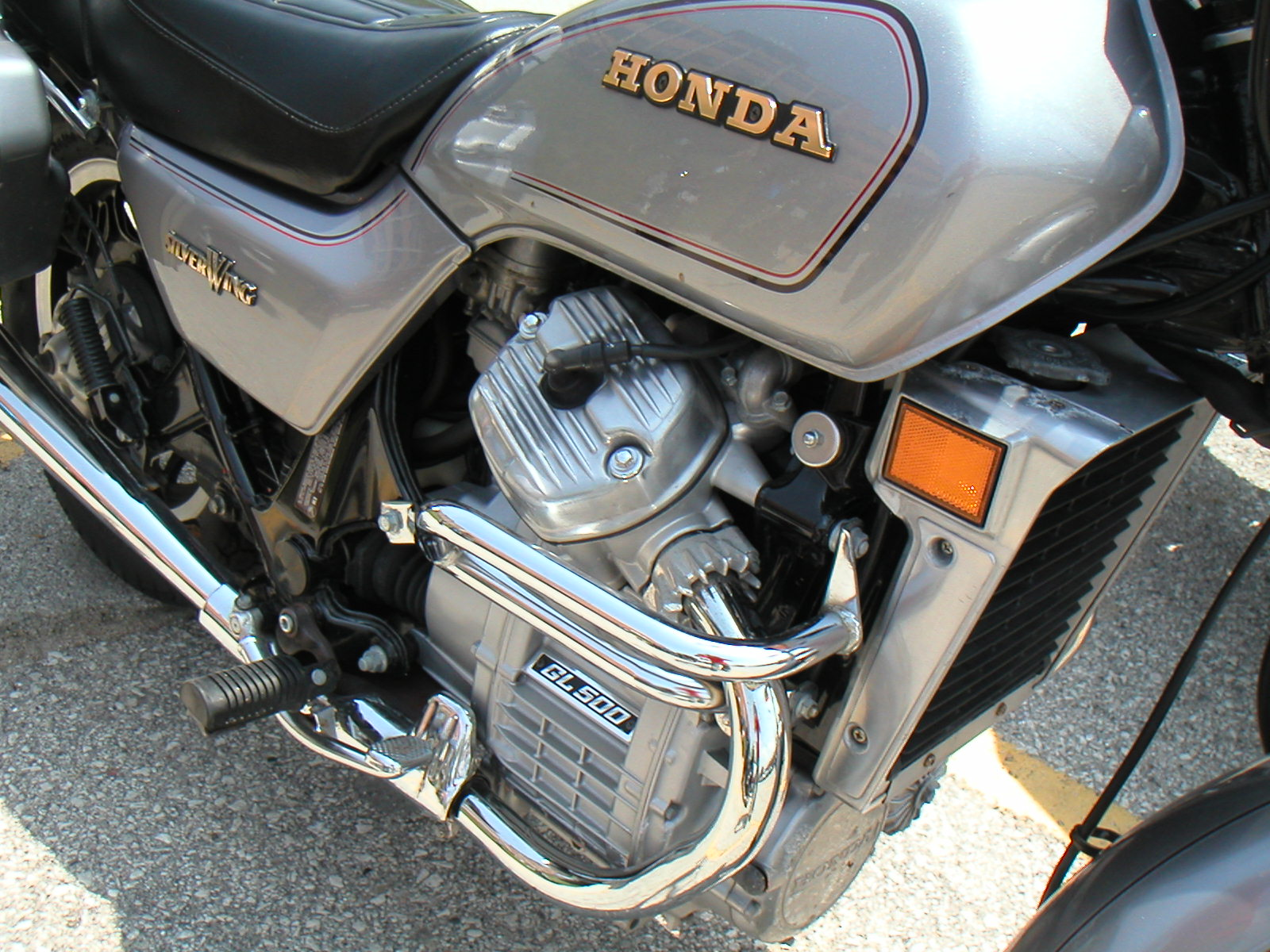
1978–1983 Honda GL500 Silver wing 80° V-twin

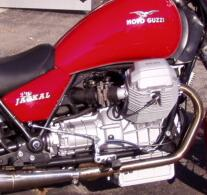
2000 Moto Guzzi Jackal 90° V-twin

== Automobiles ==
Most cars are powered by engines with three or more cylinders, however several small cars have been produced with V-twin engines particularly during the period from 1912 to 1920 when cyclecars were made by many companies (due to a favourable tax position). Almost all of these used proprietary engines, either adapting the larger motorcycle engines used for sidecar work (large singles or V-twins), or using engines specifically made for cyclecars such as those made by J. A. Prestwich Industries ('J.A.P.' engines) or F. E. Baker Ltd ('Precision' engines).

In 1912, Humber produced a light car called the Humberette with a Humber-made V-twin side-valve engine of 998cc. The engine had a directly attached clutch, 3-speed gearbox and prop shaft output to a rear differential. A water cooled version of this engine was made available in 1914, but WW1 ended Humberette production in 1915.

From 1911 to 1939, various Morgan 3-wheelers three-wheeled cyclecar models were powered by V-twin engines. Production of three-wheeler models then resumed with the 2012–present Morgan 3-Wheeler. Also in the United Kingdom, Birmingham Small Arms Company (BSA) produced several cars powered by their V-twin motorcycle engines. These were produced from 1921 to 1926 (four-wheel models) and 1929–1936 (three-wheel and four-wheel models).

Several manufacturers have produced models inspired by the original Morgan three-wheeled car, such as the 1978–present Triking Cyclecar (using a Moto Guzzi engine), the 2006–present Ace Cycle Car (using a Harley-Davidson engine) and the 1990–present JZR Trikes kit car (using engines from several manufacturers).

Mazda's first car, the 1960–1966 Mazda R360 rear-engined kei car, was powered by the 356 cc (21.7 cu in) Mazda V-twin engine. The 1961–1962 Mazda B360 front-engined light commercial vehicle used a 577 cc (35.2 cu in) version of this engine.

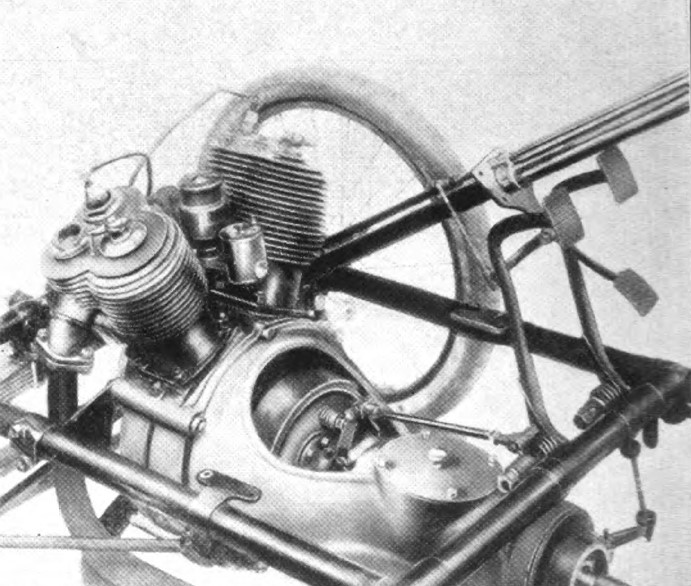
V-Twin Humber engine used in the 1912 Humberette

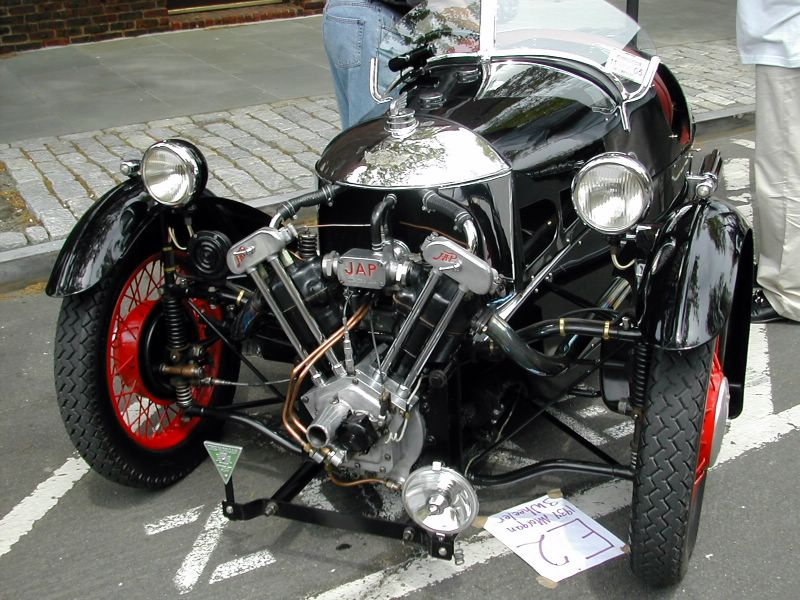
1934 Morgan Super Sports (using a JAP engine)

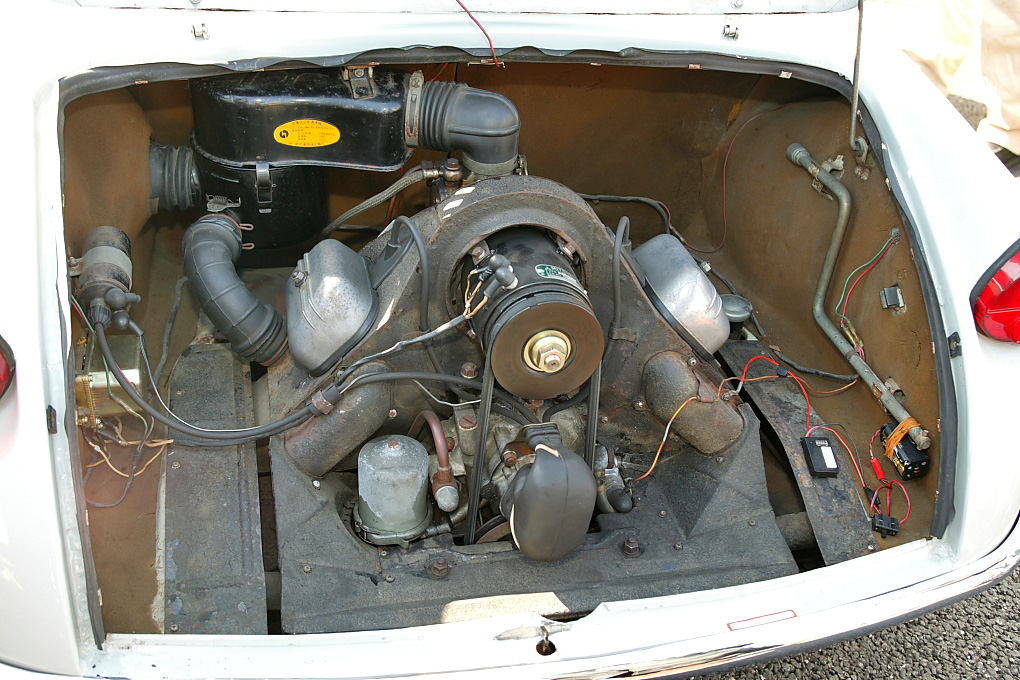
1960–1966 Mazda R360 engine

== Industrial engines ==
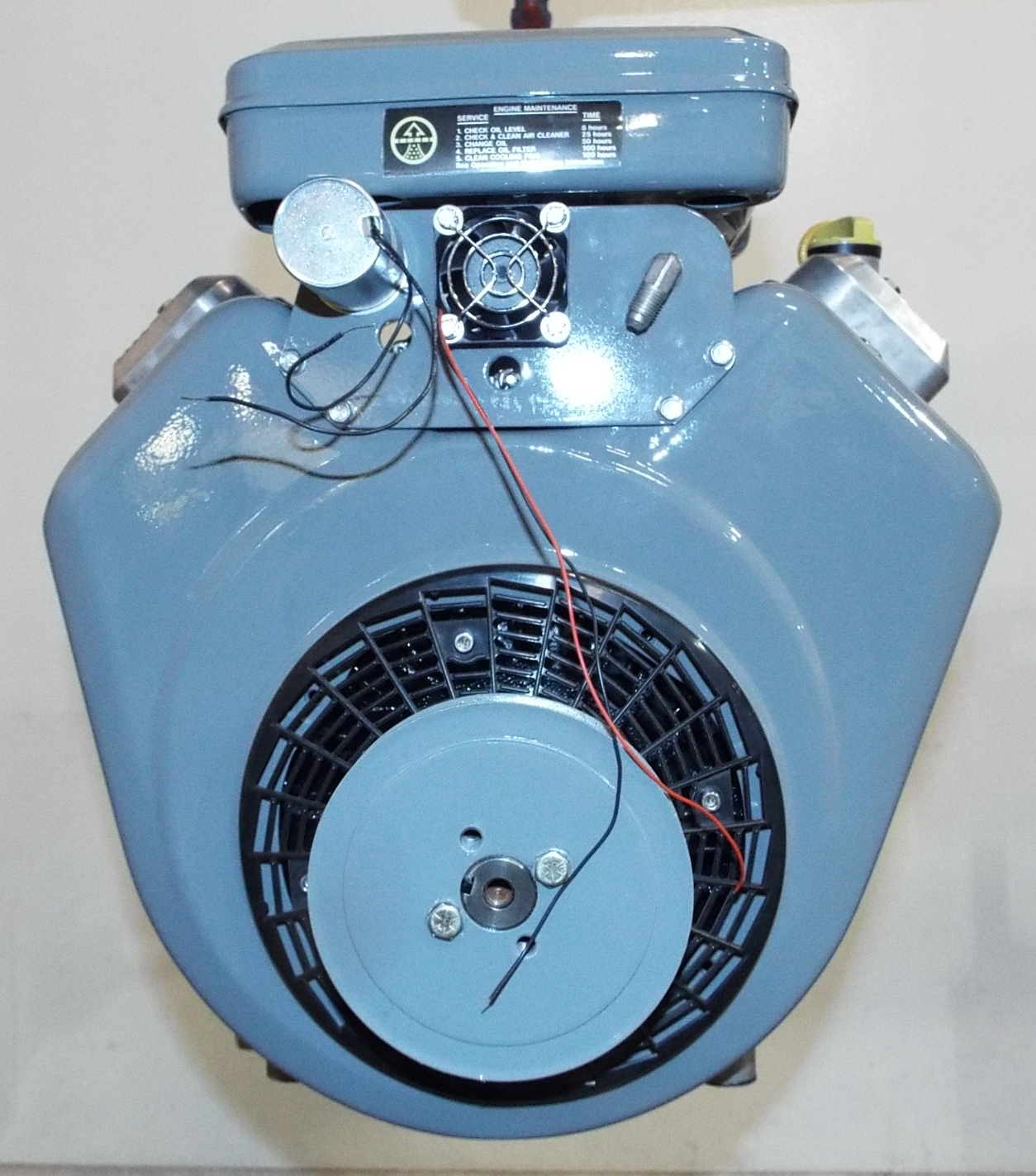
A Briggs & Stratton 90° industrial engine (seen from the accessory end)

Various V-twin engines have been produced for industrial uses such as pressure washers, lawn and garden tractors, tillers, generators and water pumps. The engines are usually air-cooled with a 90° V angle. Depending on the application, the engine's orientation can have either a horizontal or vertical crankshaft.

Manufacturers of commercial V-twin engines include Briggs & Stratton with its Vanguard, Professional and Intek V-twin series, Honda with its V-twin series engines, Kawasaki with its FD, FH, FR, FS, and FX series, Subaru with its EH series, Tecumseh with its OV691EA and TVT691 engines, and Kohler.

== See also ==
- Flat-twin engine
- List of motorcycles by type of engine
- Motorcycle engine
- Straight-twin engine
- Split-single engine
