= Kawasaki KSR110 =

Miniature motorcycle

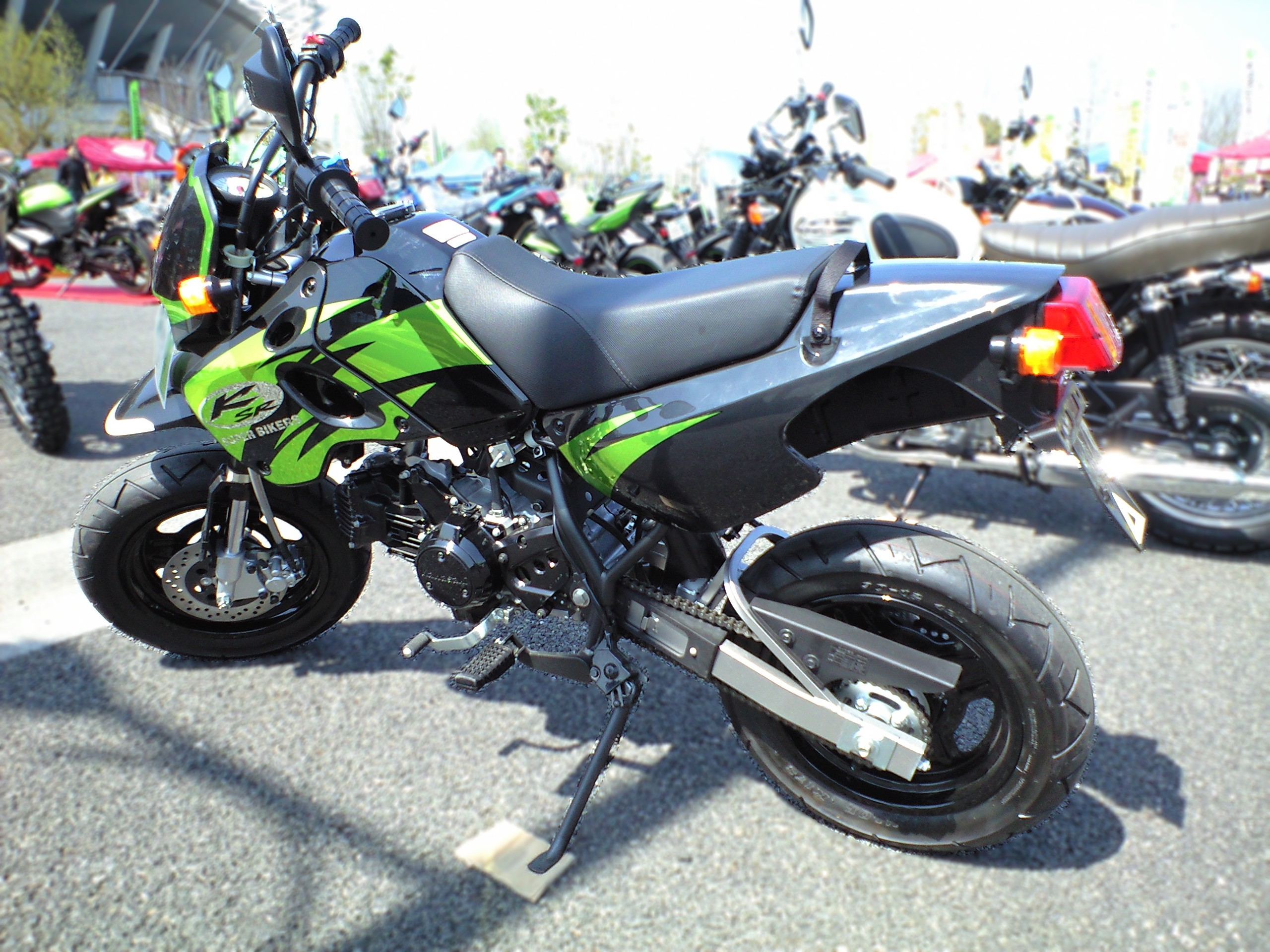
- Manufacturer: Kawasaki
- Parent company: Kawasaki Heavy Industries
- Successor: Kawasaki Z125
- Class: Minibike
- Engine: 110 cc (6.7 cu in), air-cooled, 4-stroke, single
- Transmission: 4-speed semi-automatic (centrifugal clutch)
- Related: Kawasaki KLX

The Kawasaki KSR110 is a road-legal miniature motorcycle manufactured in Southeast Asia by Kawasaki. Designed after the widely popular KLX/KX range of dirt bikes, the KSR was primarily targeted for younger riders who needs a practical, yet unique everyday motorcycle but with capabilities similar to that of more conventional motorcycles and scooters. The KSR was based on an underbone platform, more specifically the Kawasaki Edge 110, upon which it shares the same engine configuration.

== History ==
The bike was first launched in Thailand in early 2002, and was Kawasaki's first and only "miniature" supermoto-style motorcycle. It was originally dedicated for children and younger people who are just learning to ride a motorcycle, as alternative to a scooter. In 2013, the KSR was exported to other Southeast Asian countries as well, namely Indonesia, the Philippines, Malaysia, and Vietnam.

The KSR was face-lifted in mid-2013, with several minor design changes and an inclusion of an electric starter to complement the standard kick start. In addition, there is a new variant, the KSR Pro, which is launched in Indonesia in 2014. The only difference of KSR Pro to the original one is the addition of a conventional manual gearbox with standard clutch.

== See also ==
- List of Kawasaki motorcycles
