= Suzuki VX 800 =

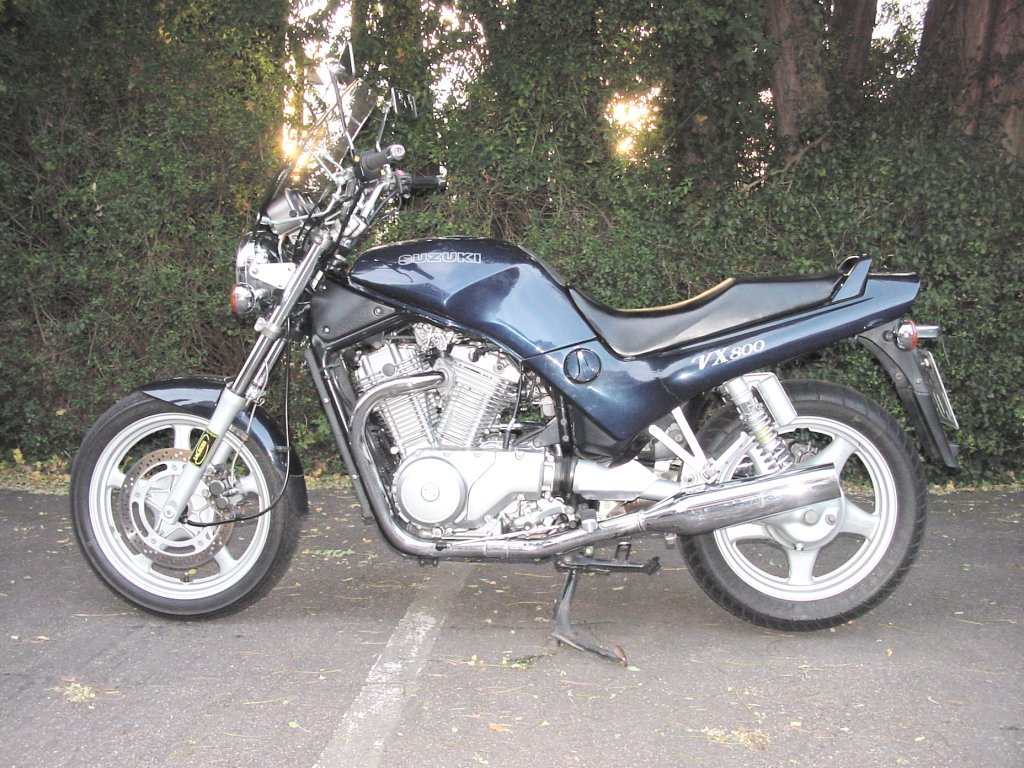
- Manufacturer: Suzuki
- Production: 1990-1997
- Class: Naked bike
- Engine: 805 cc, V-twin engine, Water-cooled, Four-stroke, 4-valves
- Power: 63 hp (47 kW) @ 7500 rpm
- Torque: 54 lb⋅ft (73 N⋅m) @ 6500 rpm
- Transmission: 5-speed, Drive shaft
- Brakes: Front: 1 disc; Rear: 1 disc;
- Tires: 110/80 R18 inch front, 150/70 R17 inch rear
- Wheelbase: 61.6 in (1,565 mm)
- Dimensions: L: 89.8 in (2,281 mm); W: 31.7 in (805 mm); H: 43.9 in (1,115 mm)
- Seat height: 31.5 in (800 mm)
- Weight: 524.7 lb (238.0 kg) (wet)
- Fuel capacity: 19.5 L (4.3 imp gal; 5.2 US gal)
- Related: Suzuki Intruder

The Suzuki VX800 is a shaft drive V-twin street motorcycle manufactured by Suzuki.

The VX800 was designed at U.S. Suzuki's Design Studio in Brea, California from 1986 to 1989, and produced in the years 1990 to 1997. Lackluster sales in the United States brought the model to an end in 1993, the European version was produced until 1997.

== Variations ==
There were four variations of the VX800:

- the Japanese version featured a slightly shorter frame.
- the European version was equipped with the pre-production 75-degree crank pin offset for smoother operation at high engine speeds.
- the American version was offered from 1990 to 1993 only. It was equipped with the Intruder's 45-degree crank pin offset as American Suzuki tests riders claimed the 75-degree crank offset made the engine feel dull and lifeless at US speeds. It also makes for a more charismatic exhaust cadence. American Suzuki also requested that the overall gearing be lower for better acceleration. The USA version has a secondary reduction of 1.133, where other markets are 1.096.
- the California version was the same as the USA version, but with additional anti-smog equipment.

== Engine ==
The engine for the VX800 was derived from the Intruder 750, with a 3 mm larger bore to increase displacement, and larger 36 mm carburetors replacing the 34 mm units. The addition of a back torque limiting clutch, similar in operation as the VS1400 Intruder.

Model VS51A, 45-degree crank pin offset, model VS51B, 75-degree crank pin offset

Type: Four-stroke, water-cooled, OHC TSCC, 45-degree V-twin
Piston displacement: 805 cc
Bore & Stroke: 83.0 mm × 74.4 mm (3.27 in × 2.93 in)
Compression ratio: 10.0:1
Carburetor, front: Mikuni BDS36SS, single
Carburetor, rear: Mikuni BS36SS, single
Transmission: 5-speed constant mesh
Final drive: Shaft, 3.090:1

== See also ==
- Suzuki Intruder
- Naked bike
