= Kawasaki Barako =

Kawasaki BC175 Kawasaki Barako 175 Kawasaki Barako II/III 175
- Manufacturer: Kawasaki Motors Philippines
- Production: 2004–present
- Predecessor: Kawasaki HD-III 125cc
- Class: Standard
- Engine: 177 cc, 4-stroke, SOHC, single-cylinder engine, Secondary air injection
- Transmission: 4-speed manual clutch; Chain-drive
- Suspension: Front: Telescopic fork Rear: Swing arm
- Brakes: Front: Drum brake Rear: Drum brake
- Tires: Front: 2.75mm x 17mm Rear: 3.00mm x 17mm
- Dimensions: L: 2010 (mm); W: 805 (mm); H: 1070 (mm)
- Fuel capacity: 12 L
- Related: Kawasaki W175

The Kawasaki Barako is a motorcycle model built by Kawasaki Motors Philippines and launched in 2004. The Kawasaki Barako was designed to replace the older two-stroke Kawasaki HD-III which was launched in 1982 until it was phased out in 2007. The BC 175 is primarily used as utility hauler for business needs like on motorized tricycle.

== Background ==
It was initially launched as the Kawasaki Barako 175 with an engine that originally came from the Eliminator, but with the implementation of stricter emissions regulations and an extremely competitive market, an enhanced version, the Kawasaki Barako II 175, was later launched. Barako III FI 175 Was Launched Years Later & As Of Now Both Barako II 175 & Barako III FI 175 Are Only Barako 175 Models Series Existing Ever Since.

There are two variants available in the market in which differs on how the motorcycle is started: a standard Barako with only a kick start and a higher variant of Barako both equipped with a kick start and an electric starter.

Some of the parts of the Kawasaki Barako are also shared with the Kawasaki W175 leisure bike, albeit with a different body and transmission setup and the lack of a kick starter.

== Features ==
The product was known for its capability to carry heavier loads due to its 177 cc displacement. Its four stroke engine is suited for utility and business use. The engine for the later model, Barako II, was tweaked to produce up to 15% more power and to be up to 13% more fuel efficient than the earlier versions of Barako, and it maintains fuel efficiency of up to 57 km per liter.

Like other utility motorcycles, the Barako series has a long seat placed behind the fuel tank to accommodate a pillion passenger. The frame was modified to allow sidecar operation. The Barako is equipped with Kawasaki Automatic Compression Release (KACR), which makes kickstarting much easier and reduces rider pressure, ensuring a smooth operation.

The use of a secondary air system enables the Barako series to pass the Euro 2 emissions standard, and later Euro III.

From 2017, the Barako II has been equipped with a fuel gauge, which is absent in earlier models. Its overall appearance was overhauled to give a more sporty look. The brakes and drivetrain were painted black and its chrome tailpipe was replaced with racing-inspired muffler.

In 2023, Kawasaki Philippines launched the Barako III. It is similar to earlier versions, with its carburetor replaced by electronic fuel injection. It featured a redesigned fuel tank and bank angle sensor.
