= Kawasaki Vulcan 500 LTD =

Motorcycle model

The Kawasaki Vulcan 500 LTD is a cruiser style beginner motorcycle that was launched in 1990 and ceased production in 2009 by Kawasaki Motors. The Vulcan 500 is powered is powered by a parallel twin, 498cc, liquid-cooled, four-stroke, DOHC, eight-valve parallel twin engine. It is based on the Kawasaki Ninja 500 engine. The Vulcan 500 LTD was priced around $5000, placing it under the beginner cruise bike category. This bike had 50hp / 36.5 kW at 8500 RPM.
