= Kawasaki KDX200 =

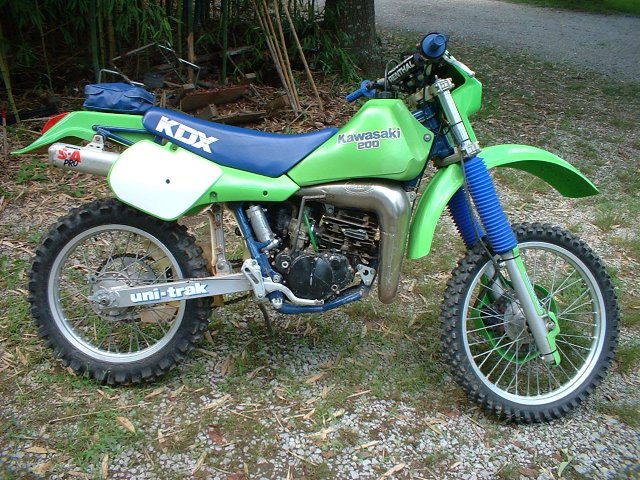
- Manufacturer: Kawasaki Motors
- Parent company: kawasaki Heavy Industries
- Production: 1983–2006
- Class: Enduro
- Engine: 198 cc single-cylinder, air cooled (83–87), liquid-cooled (88–06), 2-stroke
- Compression ratio: 7.7:1 high speed / 9.2:1 low speed
- Power: 27 bhp (20 kW)('95-'06 models)
- Suspension: Telescoping fork, Uni-Trak swingarm
- Fuel capacity: 12 L; 2.7 imp gal (3.2 US gal)
- Oil capacity: 0.75 L (0.16 imp gal; 0.20 US gal)
- Related: Kawasaki KDX125

The Kawasaki KDX200 is an intermediate enduro motorcycle intended predominantly for off-road use. It was introduced in 1983 after revisions to the preceding KDX175. It has been a long-standing model in Kawasaki's lineup, having been introduced in the early 1980s, seeing several revisions along the way up to the end of its production in 2006. The KDX200 had Kawasaki's KIPS (Kawasaki Integrated Powervalve System), assisting to maximize mid-range to top end power.

== Generational revisions ==
While performance specs remain consistent for all specific models, some differences may apply to non-American models such as frame and plastic color, metal fuel tank, oil injection, features such as blinker lights, high output coil/stator, battery rack, luggage rack, etc.

== KDX200 "A" (1983–1985) ==
KDX200 "B" (1984–1985) runs concurrently with A model variations unconfirmed - possibly local market changes.

First KDX200. 198cc engine upped from the preceding 173cc.

- Gain in displacement volume is through longer stroke; Bore diameter remains the same as the 175.
- New gear ratios in six-speed transmission, one more clutch plate added(7 from 6)
- Chassis based on 1983 KX125; steel tubing, box-section aluminum swingarm,
- Adjustable damping aluminum shock, 38mm Kayaba forks,
- Electronic odometer
- 1984(A2) available in green, or black frame with red plastic
- 1985 - new 34mm Mikuni “R” slide carburetor

Specifications for 1983–1985 U.S. Model
Engine Type	Single-cylinder, air-cooled, two-stroke
Carburetion	34mm Mikuni carb
Displacement	198cc
Bore × Stroke	66.0 x 58.0 mm
Compression Ratio	7.7:1
Fuel Capacity	12.5 L (2.7 imp gal; 3.3 US gal)
Oil Capacity	0.7 L (0.15 imp gal; 0.18 US gal)
Seat Height	1984–1985: 37" per Kawasaki specs
Dry Weight	101 kg
Tires	Front: 80/100-21; Back: 110/100-18
Brakes	Front: Single 221mm disc Back: 110mm drum
Final drive	6 Speed / chain

== KDX200 "C" (1986–1988) ==
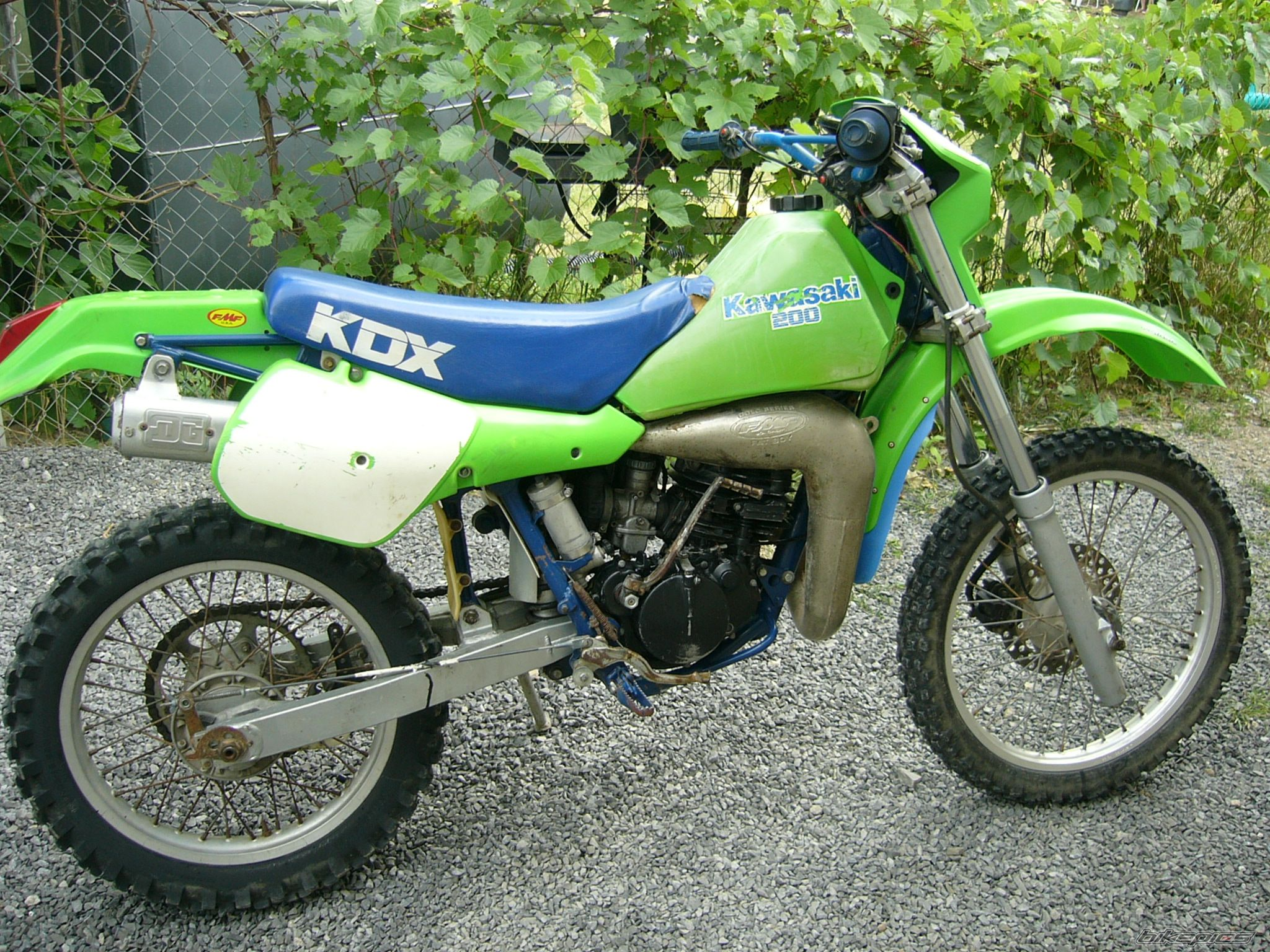
1987 KDX200

New KIPS powervalve system, new 43mm conventional forks, new rear shock, front disc brake

Specifications for 1986–1988 U.S. model
Engine Type	Single-cylinder, air-cooled, two-stroke piston and reed valve
Carburetion	Mikuni VM34SS
Displacement	198 cc (12.1 cu in)
Bore × Stroke	66.0 × 58.0 mm (2.60 × 2.28 in)
Compression Ratio	7.7:1
Fuel Capacity	12.5 L (2.7 imp gal; 3.3 US gal)
Oil Capacity	700 mL (0.74 US qt)
Seat Height	36.2" to 37" ?
Dry Weight	101 kg (223 lb)
Tires	Front: 80/100-21 51M; Rear: 100/100-18 59M
Brakes	Front: disk brake diameter 220 mm (8.7 in); Rear: internal expanding, leading trailing 110×30 mm (4.3×1.2 in)
Final drive	3.692 (48×13)

== KDX200 "E" (1989–1994) ==
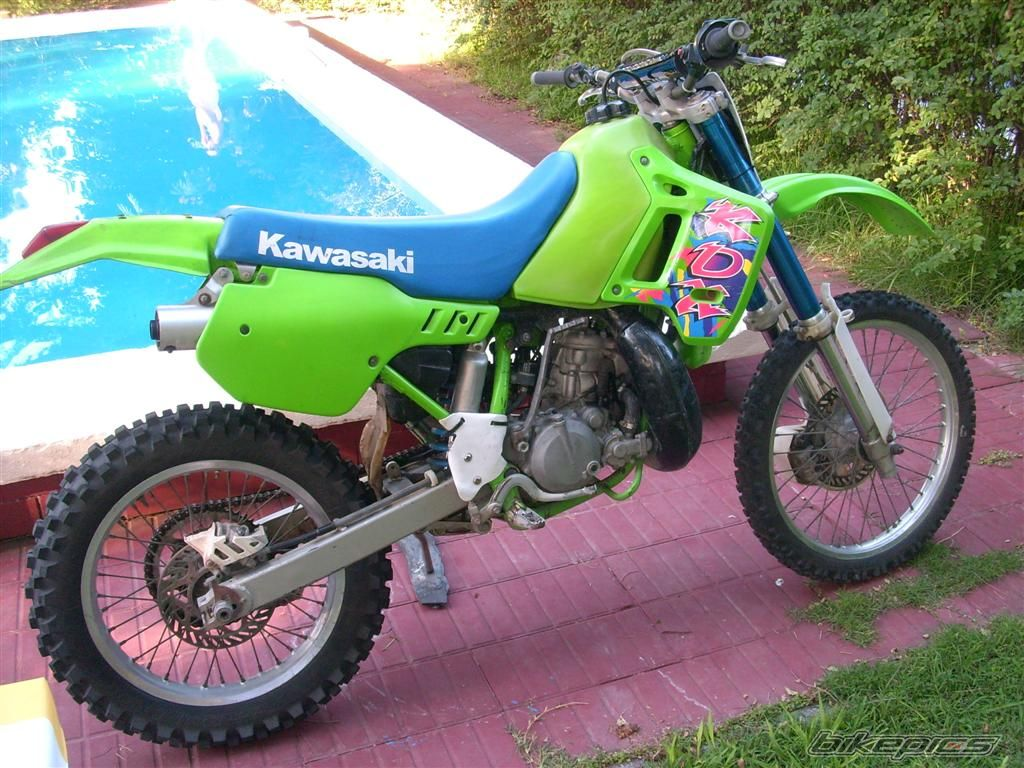
1993 KDX200-E

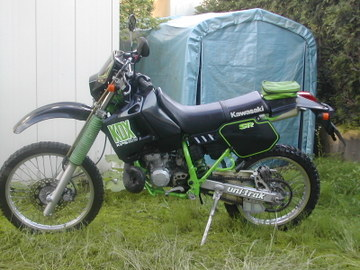
KDX200 SR model

Many key upgrades came to the KDX200 in 1989. It received liquid cooling, a modified powervalve system with larger expansion bottle and valves, a heavier crank, dual disc brakes, heavier clutch springs and more plates, a newly modeled frame with a modern style linkage, KX125-based shock with 16 compression and 16 rebound adjustments, quick release access for rear wheel, large airbox, and a 12.0 litres (2.6 imp gal; 3.2 US gal) fuel tank.

-41 mm upside down forks came standard in 93 and 94 models

Specifications for 1989-1994 U.S. Model
Engine Type	Single-cylinder, liquid-cooled, two-stroke piston reed valve
Carburetion	Keihin PWK-35
Displacement	198 cc (12.1 cu in)
Bore × Stroke	66.0 × 58.0 mm
Compression Ratio	7.7:1 (high speed) 9.2:1 (low speed)
Fuel Capacity	12.0 L (2.6 imp gal; 3.2 US gal)
Oil Capacity	SAE 10W30 or 10W40 0.75L
Seat Height	910 mm (36 in)
Dry Weight	102 kg
Tires(tube)	Front: 80/100-21 51mm Rear: 100/100-18 59mm
Brakes	Front and rear: single piston; disc
Final drive	Chain drive; 3.625 (47/13)

== KDX200 "H" (1995-2006) ==
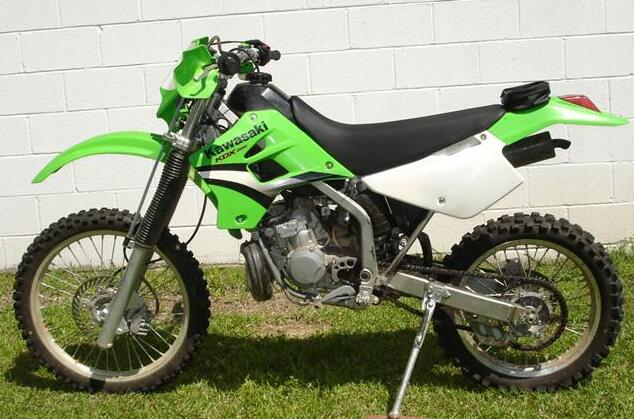
2005 KDX200-H

Notes: 1995 brought a modern new look and a redesigned KIPS powervalve system including larger valves and a central powervalve in the exhaust manifold.

- First perimeter frame
- 43mm Kayaba cartridge type forks
- Higher compression
- Larger radiators
- Larger clutch
- Taller seat

Specifications for 1995–2006 U.S. model
Engine Type	Single-cylinder, liquid cooled, two-stroke
Carburetion	Keihin PWK35
Displacement	198 cc (12.1 cu in)
Bore × Stroke	66 × 58 mm (oversquare - shortstroke)
Compression Ratio	7.9:1
Fuel Capacity	11 L (2.4 imp gal; 2.9 US gal)
Oil Capacity	0.7 L (0.15 imp gal; 0.18 US gal)
Seat Height	920 mm (36 in)
Width	890 mm (35 in)
Dry weight	101 kg (223 lb)
Tires	Front:80/100-21; Back: 100/100-18
Brakes	Front: single 250mm disc, 2-piston caliper Back: single 230mm disc, 1-piston caliper
Final drive	6-speed, chain drive

The KDX200 saw its last production run in 2006, with left over models being sold through 2007 and into mid 2008 in some areas.
