= Kawasaki KV100 =

The KV100 A (A7-A13) series and B (B1-B14) series were street legal 99.7 cc Kawasaki motorcycles manufactured from 1976 through 1988.

The motorcycles were designed mainly for the agricultural market. The KV100 was a dirt or trail motorcycle powered by a single cylinder, two-stroke, rotary disc valve engine with a displacement of 99.7 cc and producing 11.5 hp at 7500 rpm. Turn signals and indicators were optional, along with special guards for the headlight, handlebars, engine, and chain. It had a pack rack and an optional holder for a long-handled shovel. Some models had a hi/low 10-gear system.

The KV100 A7, produced in 1976, had a red fuel tank and chrome fenders in the front and back. They were available in various colors (yellow, white, blue, and green). Plastic mudguards were used around 1982.

The KV100 series is made up of parts from G3, G4, and G5 models of the same era, which used the same frame or engine. Those were sold in Australia, New Zealand, and Canada. In Australia and New Zealand, those were marketed by stock agents. The KV100 series has also been seen in Thailand and some countries in Africa, such as Zimbabwe.
