= Kawasaki Super Sherpa =

Super Sherpa
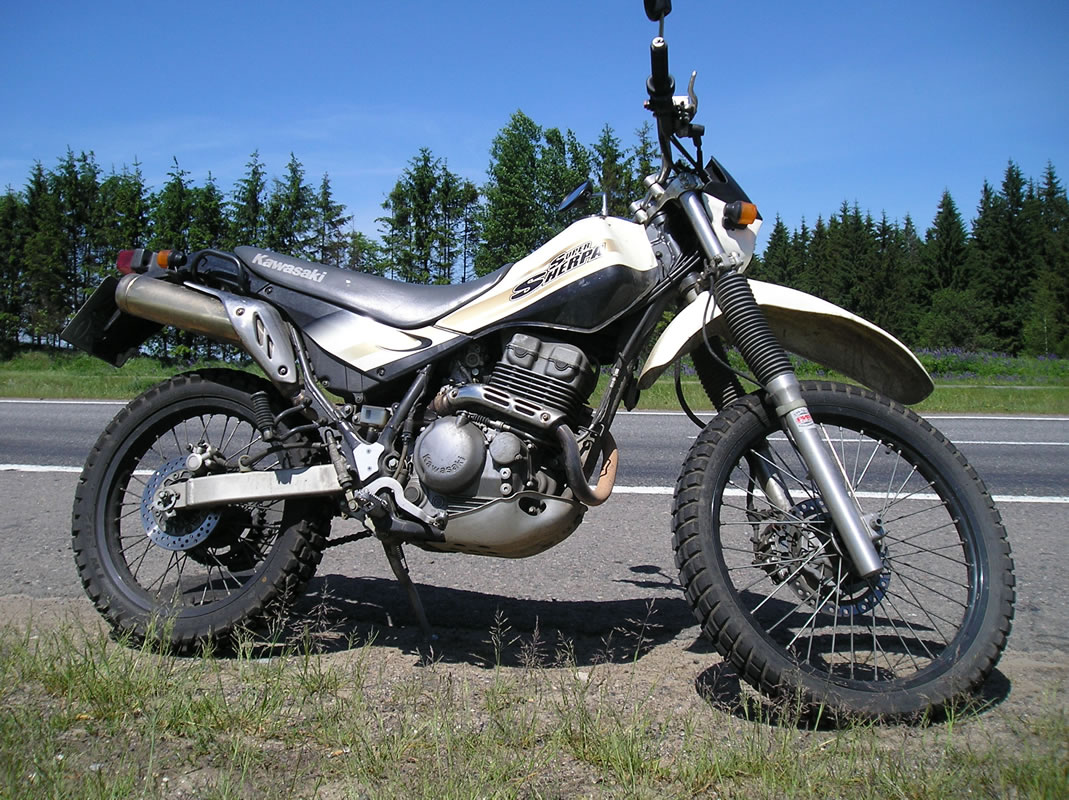
- Manufacturer: Kawasaki Motors
- Also called: KL250G, KL250H
- Parent company: Kawasaki Heavy Industries
- Production: 1997– Present
- Class: Dual-sport
- Engine: 249 cc (15.2 cu in) Air-cooled, 4-stroke Single-Cylinder
- Transmission: 6-speed
- Suspension: F: 36 mm Telescopic fork with 9.1 in (230 mm) travel. R: Uni-Trak 7.3 in (190 mm) of travel.
- Tires: F: 2.75×21 R: 4.10×18
- Rake, trail: 28 degrees / 4.2 in (110 mm)
- Wheelbase: 54.1 in (1,370 mm)
- Dimensions: L: 81.9 in (2,080 mm); W: 30.7 in (780 mm); H: 46.9 in (1,190 mm)
- Seat height: 32.7 in (830 mm)
- Weight: 282.1 lb (128.0 kg) (claimed) (wet)
- Fuel capacity: 2.4 US gal (9.1 L; 2.0 imp gal)
- Fuel consumption: 63 mpg_{‑US} (3.7 L/100 km; 76 mpg_{‑imp}) (claimed)

The Kawasaki Super Sherpa (KL250G USA, KL250H in Japan, Canada, Australia, Greece and the United Kingdom) is a dual-sport motorcycle produced by Kawasaki. It has a 249 cc DOHC four-valve air/oil cooled four-stroke single-cylinder engine.

It was first offered in Japan in 1997 to present, and was sold in the United States from 1999 to 2003. Production and sales continued in Japan and other markets and Kawasaki recently decided to sell the Super Sherpa again in the United States once more for 2009. The new model remains mostly unchanged from the previous model.
