= Kawasaki Vulcan 750 =

Kawasaki cruiser motorcycle

Kawasaki Vulcan VN750
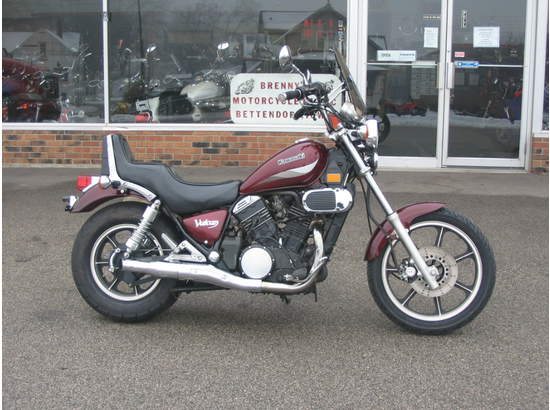
- Manufacturer: Kawasaki Motors
- Also called: Vulcan 750
- Parent company: Kawasaki Heavy Industries
- Production: 1986-2007
- Predecessor: Kawasaki Vulcan 700
- Class: Cruiser
- Engine: 749 cc (45.7 cu in) liquid-cooled Four-stroke, DOHC, 8-valve V-Twin
- Bore / stroke: 84.9 mm × 66.2 mm (3.34 in × 2.61 in)
- Compression ratio: 10.3:1
- Top speed: 110 mph (180 km/h)
- Power: 66 hp (49 kW)
- Torque: 47 lb⋅ft (64 N⋅m)
- Ignition type: Electronic
- Transmission: 5-speed, shaft drive
- Frame type: Tubular steel double cradle
- Suspension: Front: 38 mm fork; 5.9 in (150 mm) travel Rear: Air-assisted dual shocks with 4-way rebound damping; 3.5-inch travel
- Brakes: Front: dual-disc with twin-piston caliper Rear: Drum
- Tires: Front: 100/90x19 tubeless Rear: 150/90x15 tubeless
- Rake, trail: 32°, 5 in (130 mm)
- Wheelbase: 62.2 in (1,580 mm)
- Seat height: 28.9 in (730 mm)
- Weight: 483 lb (219 kg) (dry)
- Fuel capacity: 3.6 US gal (14 L; 3.0 imp gal)
- Fuel consumption: 50 mpg_{‑US} (4.7 L/100 km; 60 mpg_{‑imp})
- Related: Kawasaki Vulcan

The VN750, also known as the Vulcan 750, is a 750 cc class cruiser-style motorcycle made by Kawasaki from 1985 to 2006. The Vulcan 750 was Kawasaki's first cruiser and first V-twin engine, introduced in late 1984 as the 1985 model.

== Production history ==
Kawasaki introduced the 750 cc class Vulcan worldwide in 1985. Due to tariff restrictions in the United States on bikes over 700 cc imported from Japan, the initial US spec model was limited to 699 cc and called the Kawasaki Vulcan 700. The tariff was lifted in 1986, and all bikes from then until the production run ended in 2006 were 749 cc. The US name was changed to Vulcan 750 to reflect this.

== Overview ==
The VN750 remained largely unchanged throughout its 22-year production run with only minor adjustments to the components and varying paint schemes. The VN750 was unique in its class by featuring a more reliable shaft drive usually found on larger cruisers. The motorcycle also featured a liquid-cooled DOHC V-twin engine producing 66 horsepower and 47 ft-lbs of torque. Notably, the torque curve is quite flat, producing high torque throughout most of the rpm range. And, the engine was underrated and commonly produced 8-10% more than the advertised power during dynamometer testing.. The bike was configured to support an upright riding position with a king/queen seat and a factory installed sissy bar. The VN750 also featured adjustable air shocks front and rear, with Showa 4-way valving on the rear.
