= Kawasaki KB100 RTZ =

Motorcycle

The Kawasaki KB100 RTZ is a motorcycle produced by Kawasaki for the Indian market during the 1980s and early 1990s. The KB100 RTZ was one of the early models resulting from Kawasaki’s collaboration with Indian manufacturer Bajaj Auto.

== History ==
In the early 1980s, Escorts and TVS partnered with Yamaha and Suzuki respectively. Escorts launched the Rajdoot 350 (Yamaha RD350B) in 1983 and TVS launched the Ind-Suzuki AX100 in 1984–85. Bajaj Auto, which had a lead in the manufacture of scooters (started with Vespa-150), partnered with Kawasaki of the Fastest Bike in the World Kawasaki "Ninja group" to bring in the KB100, a two-stroke motorcycle based on Kawasaki KH125, a 125 cc model reduced to 100 cc capacity (97.6 cc due to engine import restriction in India during that era) bearing the same chassis.

Production began in 1986–87 and went on until 1996 when the KB125 (all-aluminium engine (block and piston) as compared to cast iron block on earlier models) was launched.

== Features ==
Next came the SX Enduro, which was an off-road scrambler bike with the same engine, but tweaked for lower-end torque.

The final variant was the KB100 RTZ "Delta Super Tuned". This version was given a resonator box and the gearbox casing near the gear shift lever had the words "Delta Super Tuned". Presumably this version was a last-ditch attempt to rally sales in a market that was dominated by RX100 sales. The ergonomic grips, Front Break + Clutch Lever and the switch gears were directly imported from Japan at first until "Minda" started manufacturing original equipment including the ignition key cum either-side Steering Lock which had a unique feature of "City-light" position after locking the steering, one can put on the parking lights keeping all other electrical off. Also, one of the main features in this bike are it has its carburettor being fitted inside the gear box.

The KB 100 is powered by the oil pump, one fills another oil called 2T oil which is received and pumped by this oil pump. Both the carburettor and oil pump are manufactured by "Mikuni" and that oil pump appears to be out, that is, it is not submerged into oil. Even a four stroke vehicle has an oil pump fitting inside its engine, whose principle work is to circulate the oil all over its components. Being a two stroke vehicle, this is the only vehicle which has its carburettor covered. Until this date no other Indian bike has this feature.

Other features are

1. Right-side engine-killing switch
2. Speed/Taco cum fuel gauge assembly
3. Choke lever integrated with left-hand side switch assembly
4. Carburetor housed inside engine casing to prevent from tampering
5. Rotary disc intake valve
6. Long wheel base 1260 mm
7. Long-travel telescopic Front Shock Absorber
8. Wider tires
9. 12 V electrical system a magneto 35+35W "Stanley Seal-beamed Headlamp (later models came with user-replaceable bulb assembly) with 12 V 5 amp-hr battery which could easily power 21 W+21 W turn signal indicators with other tale-tell lights with 21 W stop light

In March–April 1996 the KB125 was launched. A 12.5 bhp (9.3 kW) machine, it looked exactly like th KB100, except that the side panels said "KB125". A few months on, the paintwork was changed, which gave the bike a more contemporary look. The bike didn't sell too much even though it had more power than the comparable Yamaha RXG (11.8 bhp). Bajaj Engineers also experimented with a five-speed version of the bike, called the KB125 Prowler, but none seem to have been sold.

== Legacy ==
A reliable, (relatively) fuel efficient machine, the KB100 has quite a few patrons, especially in Pune and Bengaluru. Though it does not enjoy the same status or reputation of the Yamaha RXs or the Suzuki Shoguns 110 cc 14 bhp, it still is an important milestone in the history of Indian motorcycling. It was produced until 2000. When emission regulations were made more stringent by Indian government, Bajaj was forced to halt its production. The looks and a big bike feel and superior engine noise is noteworthy. The RTZ has a tachometer and fuel gauge from its first production.
