= Kawasaki 454 LTD =

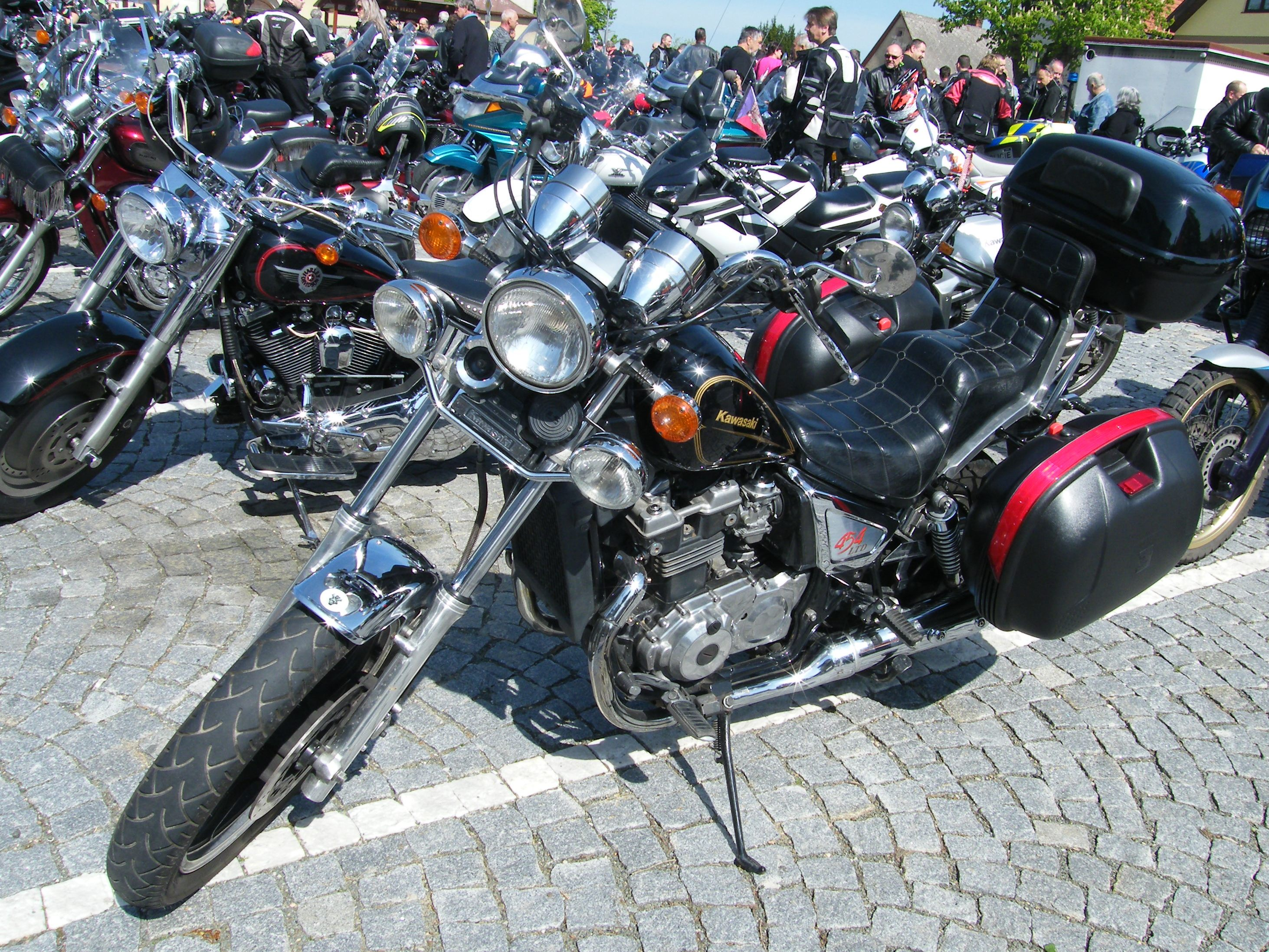
- Manufacturer: Kawasaki Motors
- Also called: 454 LTD, EN450
- Parent company: Kawasaki Heavy Industries
- Production: 1985 - 1990
- Predecessor: 440LTD
- Successor: Vulcan 500 LTD
- Class: Street
- Engine: 454.1 cc liquid-cooled four-stroke transverse parallel (inline) twin
- Transmission: 6-speed, belt drive
- Brakes: Front: Single-disc; Rear: Drum
- Wheelbase: 58.1" to 59.1" (1476 mm to 1502 mm)
- Dimensions: L: 86.81" (2,205 mm); W: 32.3" (820 mm)
- Seat height: 29.3" (745 mm)
- Weight: 397 lbs (180 kg) (dry); 445 lbs (202 kg) (wet)
- Fuel capacity: 3.0 gallons
- Related: Kawasaki Ninja 908

The Kawasaki 454 LTD is a motorcycle produced from 1985 to 1990, also known as the EN450. It is the forerunner of the Kawasaki Vulcan.

== Overview ==
The engine was based on the Kawasaki Ninja 900s, with two fewer cylinders. The Kawasaki 900 had a 908 cc engine. Removing two cylinders from the 4-cylinder divided the number of cc's by two. (908/2 = 454, thus the name). Included was the liquid cooling, the bore and stroke, the double overhead camshafts, and four valves per cylinder, although the cam chain was relocated from the left side of the engine to the middle, running between the two cylinders. The design basis for the engine bottom end was also totally different, with fundamental differences easily observed from the outside in the water pump, charging system and starter motor solutions. Nevertheless, the engine top end design of the Ninja gave the LTD a great deal of power for its size, redlining at 10,000 RPM while delivering 50 horsepower. The Kawasaki 454 is well known for its acceleration, having raced against a 454 LS big block Chevrolet Corvette and beating it to both 0-60 and the quarter mile by more than a second.

Despite the 440 being its predecessor in the sale of middle-size-displacement motorcycles designed by Kawasaki, the two shared almost nothing in design, as the Kawasaki 440 had a single overhead camshaft and had only two valves per cylinder, and was air-cooled, producing 41 horsepower to the 454's 50 horsepower. Both motorcycles were highly reliable and low maintenance, but for different reasons, as the 440 was just a very simple machine to service, and the 454 needed little maintenance over time as a result of its belt drive.

The Kawasaki 454 was discontinued in favor of the Kawasaki Vulcan 500 in 1990, with no increase in horsepower despite the larger engine size. The Vulcan 500 was designed very similarly to the 454, with the basis again being from a Ninja counterpart, but the engine was taken straight from the 500 Ninja, and still de-tuned slightly compared to the 454 to give it more cruiser-like characteristics, with other changes such as a chain drive (implemented in later models), and no tachometer on the Vulcan 500 being implemented in the changeover, along with a bicycle spoke look for the wheels. Many of these changes took place over time as the Vulcan changed from its Model A form (very similar to that of the 454) to the Model C form.
