= Kawasaki KMX =

The Kawasaki KMX is a lightweight dual-purpose trail motorcycle produced by Kawasaki from the mid-1980s to the early 2000s. It features a liquid-cooled two-stroke single-cylinder engine, front and rear disc brakes, Kawasaki's Uni-Trak monoshock rear suspension, and the KIPS (Kawasaki Integrated Power-valve System) for improved power delivery across the rev range.

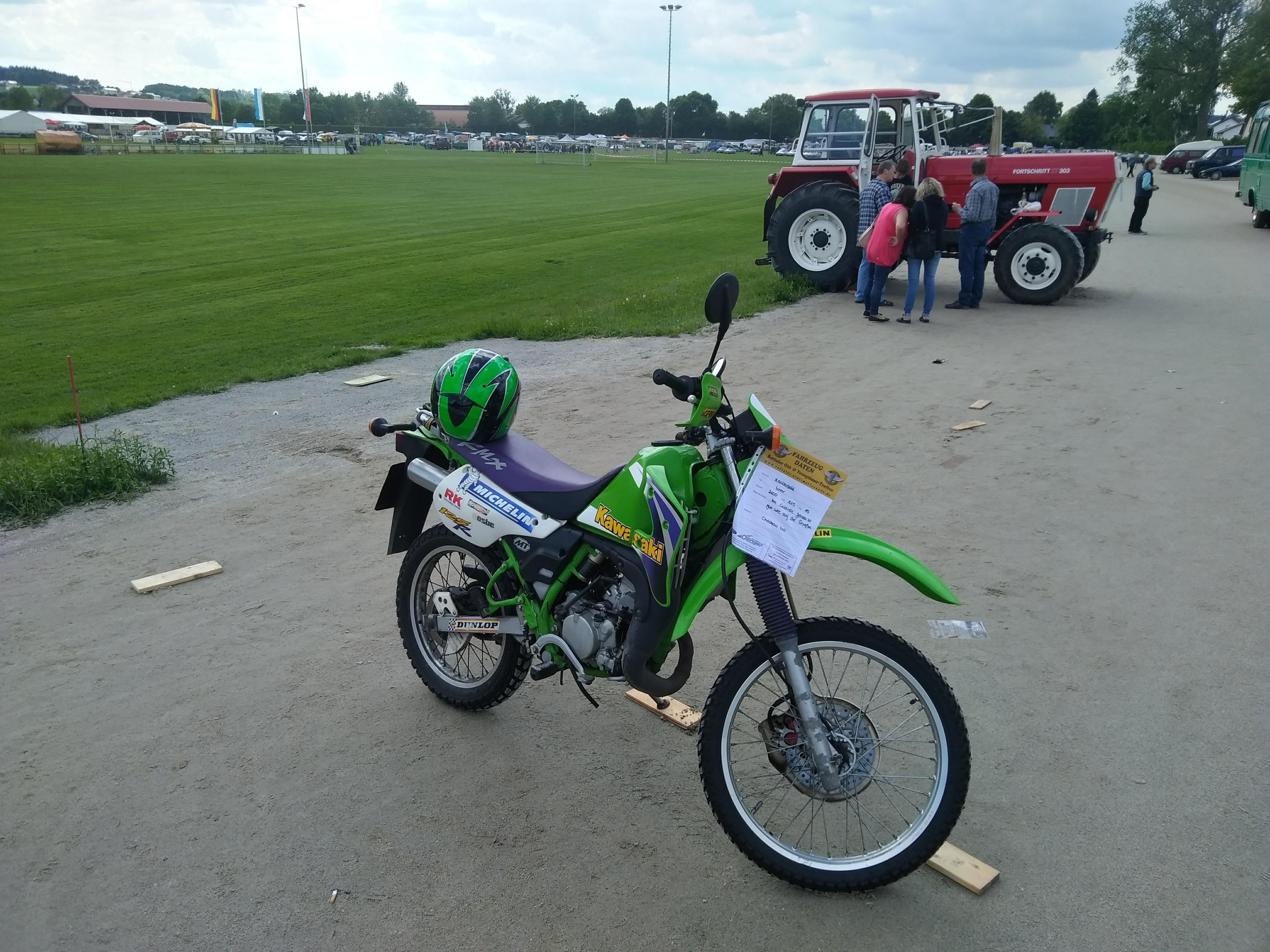
Kawasaki KMX 125

Two main variants were produced: the more common KMX 125 (exported widely, including to Europe and the UK) and the rarer KMX 200 (primarily in select markets like the UK, with greater low-end torque).

== KMX 125 ==
Kawasaki KMX 125
- Manufacturer: Kawasaki Motors
- Parent company: Kawasaki Heavy Industries
- Production: 1986–2002
- Class: Dual-sport / Trail
- Engine: 124 cc two-stroke single, liquid-cooled, reed valve induction
- Bore / stroke: 54 × 54.4 mm
- Compression ratio: 7.8:1
- Top speed: 71 mph (restricted) – 80+ mph (derestricted)
- Power: 12 bhp (restricted) – 20–22 bhp (derestricted) @ 9,500 rpm
- Torque: ~12 lb-ft / 17 Nm @ 9,000 rpm (derestricted)
- Transmission: 6-speed manual, chain final drive
- Suspension: Front: telescopic forks (230 mm travel); Rear: Uni-Trak monoshock, adjustable preload (230 mm travel)
- Brakes: Front: single 230 mm disc Rear: single 210 mm disc
- Tires: Front: 2.75-21; Rear: 4.10-18
- Wheelbase: 1,375 mm
- Seat height: 865 mm
- Weight: 96 kg (dry)
- Fuel capacity: 9.3 L

The KMX 125 was popular as an affordable, versatile on- and off-road bike, especially among learners in restricted form (typically limited to around 12–13 bhp for compliance with A1/provisional licenses in markets like the UK). Restrictions were commonly achieved via a washer in the exhaust or carburetor/jetting changes and were straightforward to remove for full performance.

In derestricted form, it offered lively two-stroke performance with a strong mid-to-top-end powerband thanks to KIPS, lightweight handling, and good trail capability. It competed with models like the Yamaha DT125R.

Common reliability notes include the need for regular top-end maintenance (typical of two-strokes), cleaning of the power valve, and proper premix oil use, but many examples have proven durable with basic care.

== KMX 200 ==
A higher-capacity version with a 191 cc engine, producing around 25–30 bhp (derestricted) and significantly more low-end torque for better trail usability. While it shared the 125 model’s frame it incorporated upgraded forks, yokes, and rear swingarm exclusive to the 200, along with a 17-inch rear wheel.

Kawasaki KMX 200
- Manufacturer: Kawasaki Motors
- Parent company: Kawasaki Heavy Industries
- Production: 1988–1992 (shorter run)
- Class: Dual-sport / Trail
- Engine: 191 cc two-stroke single, liquid-cooled
- Bore / stroke: 67 × 54 mm
- Power: ~25–30 hp @ 8,500 rpm
- Torque: ~18–20 ft-lb
- Transmission: 6-speed manual
- Suspension: Similar to KMX 125 (telescopic front forks; Uni-Trak rear monoshock)
- Brakes: Front & rear disc (similar sizing to 125)
- Tires: Front: 3.00-21; Rear: 4.60-17
- Weight: ~100 kg (dry)
- Fuel capacity: 9.3 L

The KMX 200 shared the same chassis and features but felt punchier due to the extra displacement, though it had a shorter production life and is less common.

== See also ==
- Kawasaki KDX125
- Yamaha DT125
