= Kawasaki KX327 =

Off-road motorcycle announced 2026

The Kawasaki KX327 is a 2-stroke off-road motorcycle made by Kawasaki. In a New Model Press Release dated June 2, 2026 Kawasaki announced the release of an all new Kawasaki motorcycle. Available in two versions the KX327X is an off-road version of the Motocross KX327. The announcement signals Kawasaki's recommitment to the 2-stroke off-road motorcycle market. It is a thoroughly modern bike featuring electric start, advanced fuel injection, an electronic power valve and a programmable ECU.
