= Kawasaki Vulcan =

Kawasaki motorcycle

Vulcan
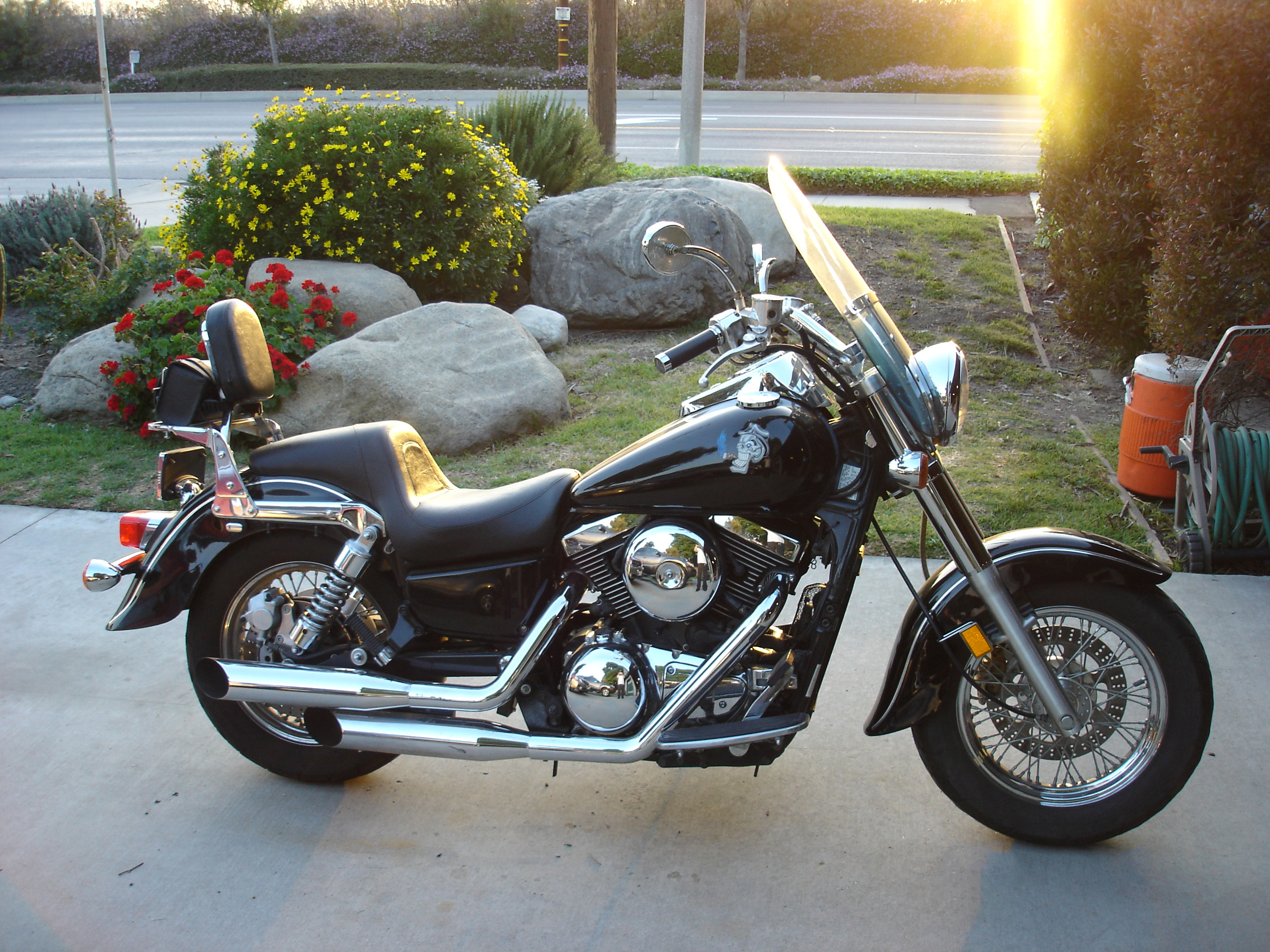
- Manufacturer: Kawasaki Motors
- Also called: VN
- Parent company: Kawasaki Heavy Industries
- Production: 1984–present
- Class: Cruiser
- Engine: 400–2000 cc V-twin, 500 and 650 cc parallel twin

The Vulcan name has been used by Kawasaki for their custom or touring bike since 1984, model designation VN, using mostly V-twin engines ranging from 398 to 2,053 cc (24.3 to 125.3 cu in).

== Model history ==
Year Type	1980s						1990s										2000s										2010s										2020s				
Year Type	4	5	6	7	8	9	0	1	2	3	4	5	6	7	8	9	0	1	2	3	4	5	6	7	8	9	0	1	2	3	4	5	6	7	8	9	0	1	2	3	4
Entry-level	—N/a		Vulcan 400 (series 1)				Vulcan 400 (series 2)															—N/a																			
Entry-level	—N/a		Vulcan 400 (series 1)				Vulcan 500																				—N/a														
Sport cruiser	—N/a																															Vulcan 650 S									
Cruiser	Vulcan 750 (700)																						Vulcan 900																		
Cruiser	—N/a											Vulcan 800											Vulcan 900																		
Big bore	—N/a			Vulcan 88													—N/a																								
Big bore	—N/a												Vulcan 1500													Vulcan 1700															
Big bore	—N/a																		Vulcan 1600							Vulcan 1700															
Big bore	—N/a																				Vulcan 2000							—N/a													

=== 1984–2006: Vulcan 750 series ===
In 1985, Kawasaki launched the Vulcan VN700A worldwide, its first cruiser powered by its first V-twin engine. The VN700A has a shaft drive. Kawasaki also made the now rare VZ 750 variant with chromed wheel arches and other subtle differences. To avoid United States tariffs on Japanese motorcycles over 700cc, the initial US model was limited to 699 cc but in 1986, the tariff was lifted so the engine capacity was increased to 749 cc. Apart from paint schemes the Vulcan remained largely unchanged throughout its 22-year production run with only minor adjustments to components.

=== 1986–2004: Vulcan 400 series ===
Kawasaki introduced the Vulcan 400 in 1986 as an entry-level cruiser. For a first series, the Vulcan 400 featured a 398 cc liquid-cooled twin engine, and was fitted with a belt drive and six-speed transmission. The series 2 Vulcan 400 featured a 399 cc liquid-cooled V-twin engine similar in design to the 750. The series 2 was fitted with a chain drive and five-speed transmission to reduce cost and was produced in both Classic and Drifter variations.

=== 1990–2009: Vulcan 500 series ===
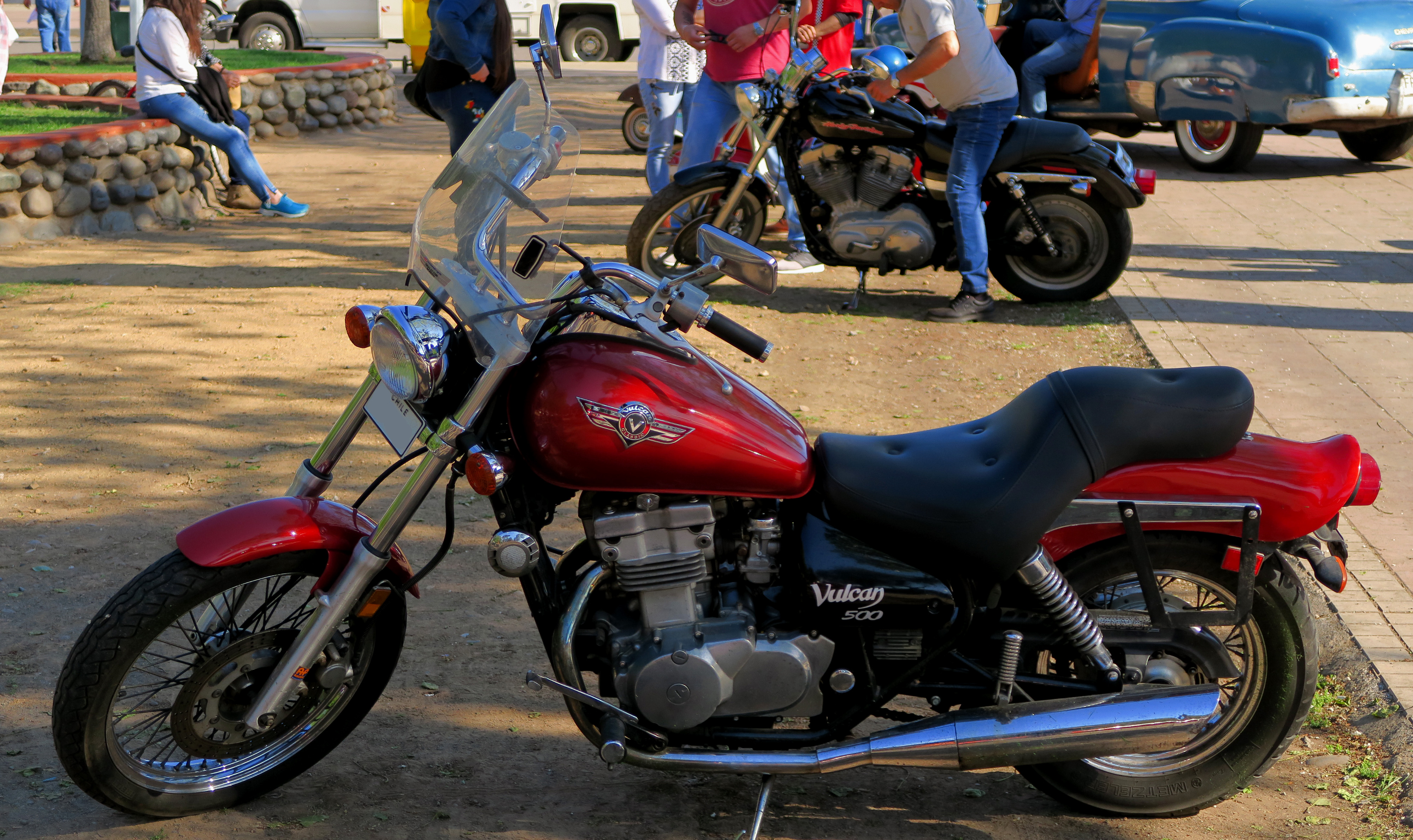
Vulcan 500

The Vulcan 500 (EN500A) introduced in 1990 was the successor to the Kawasaki 454 LTD. The EN500A was fitted with a parallel twin 498 cc engine nearly identical to the Kawasaki Ninja 500R. It had a 6-speed transmission and belt final drive. The EN500A was discontinued after 1996 and replaced with the Vulcan 500 LTD (EN500C). Both versions were available as 1996 models. With the EN500C the ergonomics changed as well as the engine tuning. New cam shaft profiles and slightly lower compression pistons moved the power band down to increase low end torque. Also the carburetors were downsized from 34mm to 32mm. The belt final drive was replaced with a chain. The Vulcan 500 LTD was discontinued after the 2009 model year for a nearly 20 year production run.

=== 2015–present: Vulcan 650 S Series ===
The Vulcan 650 S (EN650AF/BF) is designated as a sport cruiser. It was introduced in 2015 with an Ergo-Fit system designed for better custom comfort adjustability for different rider sizes: A choice of three foot peg positions, three seats and two handlebars are available to choose from, at time of purchase. The engine is a 649cc parallel twin derived from the Ninja 650. Retuned, heavier flywheel and redesigned intake give the Vulcan S more low and mid range torque. It has very non traditional cruiser looks with a unique frame and suspension layout.

- Vulcan 650 S/ABS
- 649cc parallel twin, fuel injected (38mm x 2 with sub-throttles), liquid cooled, DOHC 8 valve, 10.8:1 compression ratio, 4-stroke engine
- 9500 rpm redline
- 46.3 lb-ft@6600 rpm, maximum torque
- Top speed ~120 mph (claimed)
- 6-speed transmission
- chain drive
- Frame Type: High-tensile steel diamond frame
- 41mm front forks, adjustable rear lay down monoshock
- Front Brakes: 300mm single disc with dual piston calipers, Rear brakes: 250mm single disc with single piston caliper, with available ABS
- Fuel Tank: 3.7 gal (14 Litres)
- Weight: 498 lbs (226 kg)
- Seat Height: 27.8 in (706mm)
- Front Tire: 18"
- Rear Tire: 17"
- Wheelbase: 62"
- Rake/Trail: 31/4.7"
- Overall Length: 90.0"
- Overall Width: 34.6"
- Overall Height: 43.3"
- Ground Clearance: 5.1"

All Specs via

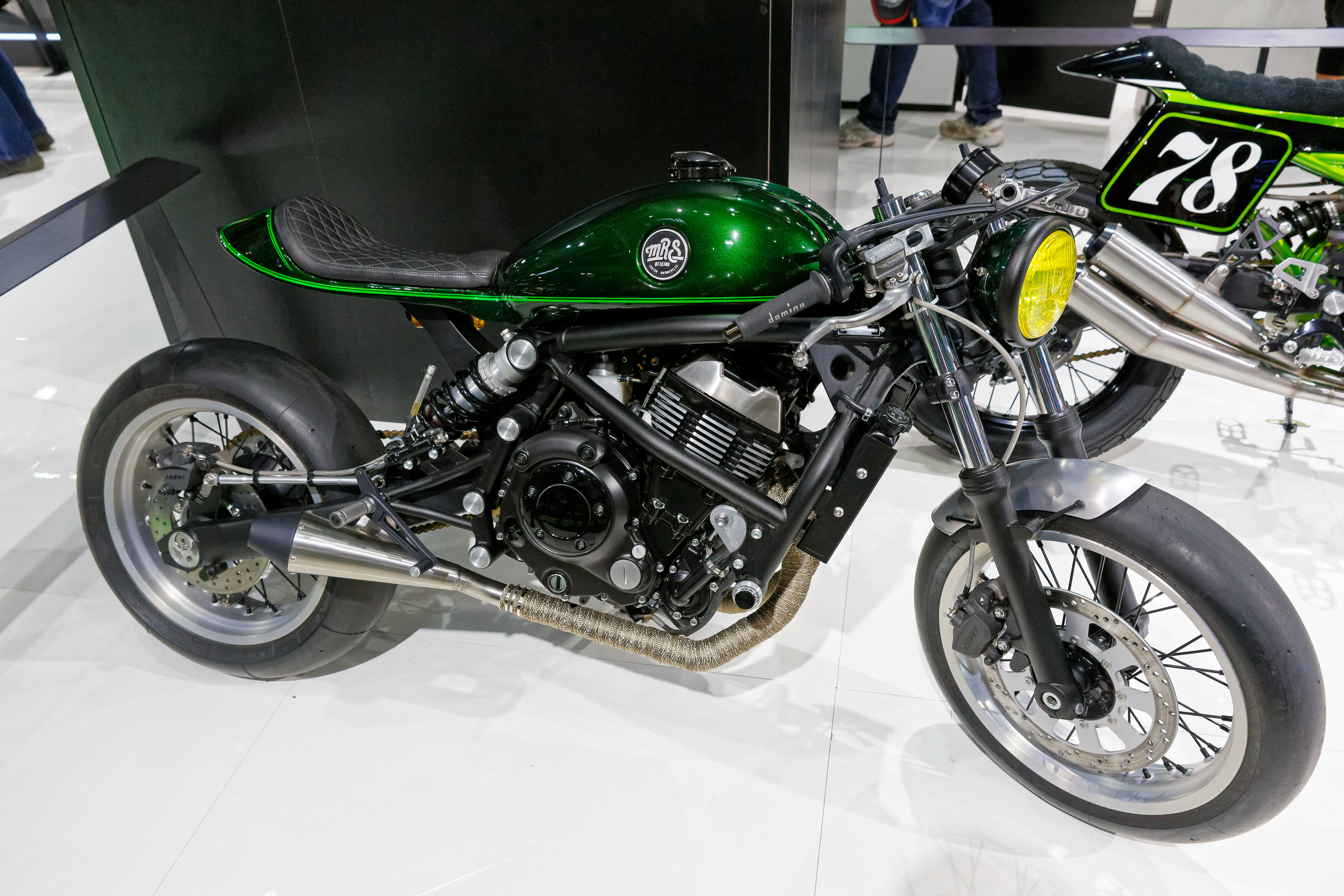
Vulcan S ABS Café, customised by MRS Oficina

In 2016, Kawasaki released a café racer variant as the Vulcan S Café; one was customised by Mário Raphael Soares of MRS Oficina and exhibited at Salon de la Moto Paris in 2015.

=== 1987–2008: Vulcan 88/1500 series ===
The Vulcan 88 was introduced in 1987 and was immediately seen as a shot across the bow of other big bore motorcycles of the time, notably the Honda Gold Wing (1200cc) and the Harley Davidson Electra Glide (1340cc).

The 88 was a reference to the nominal displacement (in cubic inches) of the liquid-cooled V-twin engine, at 1,470 cc (89.7 cu in); the 88 was produced from 1987 through 1999. It was immediately dubbed 'The King of the Cruisers' by at least one motorcycle magazine A four-speed transmission was blended with the "large for its time motor" and offered consumers a big-bore metric cruiser that was comfortable and relatively light-weight at just over 600 lb (270 kg) when "rider ready". Claimed output was 56.2 hp (41.9 kW) at 4500 RPM and 78.6 lb⋅ft (106.6 N⋅m) at 3250 RPM.

The Vulcan 1500 Classic, introduced in 1996, had a 1,470 cc (90 cu in) liquid-cooled SOHC 50° V-twin engine with a single-pin crankshaft and a 5 speed transmission. Compared to the Vulcan 88 (which had been renamed to the Vulcan 1500 by that time), it had a lower 27.6-inch (700 mm) seat height, wide handlebar, and forward-mounted floorboards.

The 1500 Meanstreak was introduced in 2002 and lasted 2 years, before giving way to the 1600 Meanstreak. This performance version of the 1500 had the same basic engine as the 1500FI, but sported several upgrades including new camshafts, larger valves, larger fuel injection throttle bodies, new high compression pistons, and re-designed combustion chamber. It was fitted with the same brakes as the ZX-9R. It also had a slimmed down narrower gas tank. This meant an increase to 72 hp (54 kW) at 5500 rpm and 90 lb⋅ft (120 N⋅m) at 3000 rpm, while weighing in at 637 lb (289 kg) dry.

The Vulcan 1500 Drifter was a homage to the 1948 Indian Chief which began production in 1999 and ceased production in 2005. It is notable for its large Indian-style fenders, wide solo seat, wide handlebars and fringe in several places.

=== 1995–2006: Vulcan 800 series ===
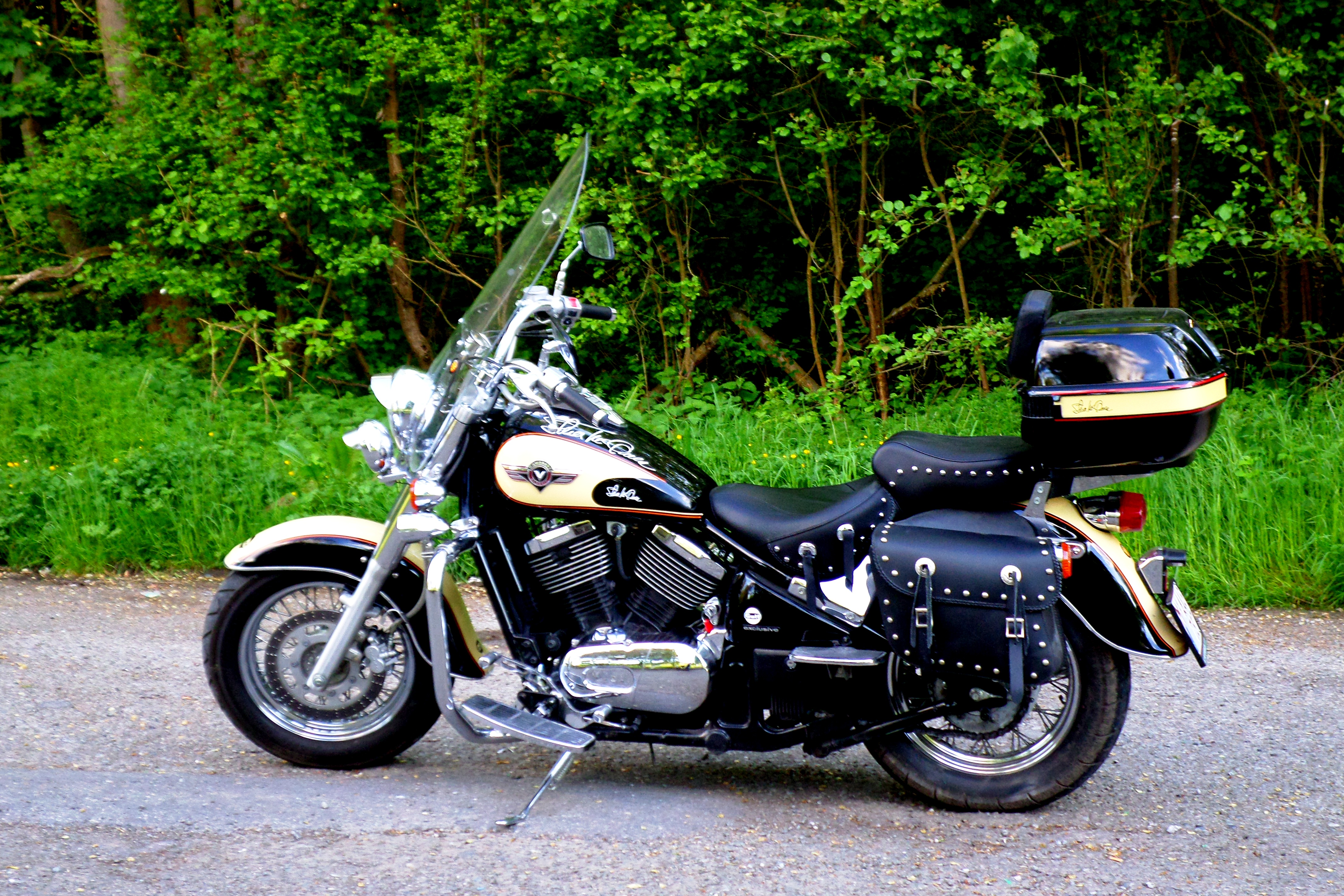
Kawasaki Vulcan 800, 1999 model, two-tone black and cream.

Two models of the Vulcan, VN800A and VN800B, were discontinued in 2006 with the introduction of the VN900. The VN800A, introduced in 1995 and the first of Kawasaki's modern cruiser style, featured a softail design, bobbed rear fender and a 21-inch front wheel. The VN800B (Classic), introduced in 1996, had a retro styling that featured full fenders and 16-inch wheels on both front and rear.

- Vulcan 800A / Classic / Drifter
  - 52.9 hp (39.4 kW)
  - 805 cc (49.1 cu in) liquid-cooled four valves per cylinder V-twin
  - Single Keihin 36 mm carburetor
  - Five-speed transmission
  - Hidden mono-shock/spring back
  - Chain drive

=== 2002–2008: Vulcan 1600 series ===
- Vulcan 1600 Classic
  - 1,552 cc (94.7 cu in) SOHC liquid-cooled four valves per cylinder V-twin engine
  - Five-speed transmission

Kawasaki Vulcan Nomad 1600 (2006)

- Vulcan 1600 Nomad
  - 1,552 cc (94.7 cu in) liquid-cooled 50° V-twin
  - Digital Fuel Injection with dual 36 mm throttle bodies
  - Four valves per cylinder
- Vulcan 1600 Mean Streak
  - 1,552 cc (94.7 cu in) liquid-cooled 50° V-twin
  - Hydraulic Valve Lash Adjusters

=== 2004–2010: Vulcan 2000 series ===
Based and built on the same frame, the Vulcan 2000 base model, Classic, and Classic LT have only subtle differences between the variations. The most apparent is the "bug-eye" chrome nacelle projection headlight that was first introduced on the 2004 Vulcan VN2000A base model. This headlight was the only offering from Kawasaki until the introduction of the Vulcan Classic VN2000D in 2006, which employed a more traditional headlight. Also introduced in 2006, the Vulcan Classic LT VN2000F. The Classic LT had an appearance similar to the Classic but added saddlebags, windshield, passenger floorboards and passenger backrest to the offering. The engine in the VN2000 was briefly the largest displacement production engine in a motorcycle (2053cc/125ci) before it was superseded by the Triumph Rocket 3 later that same year. It remained the largest displacement production V-Twin ever sold, as the Rocket is a Triple (inline 3) until 2025, when Harley-Davidson introduced the CVO Road Glide RR with a 131 cubic inch (2147cc) V-twin that had previously been only an aftermarket upgrade. In addition to its immense size and power, the VN2000 was different in one other way for Kawasaki. It is their only V-Twin with external lifters, making it unique in the Vulcan lineup and giving it more of a Harley look.

- Configuration
  - 2,053 cc (125.3 cu in) 52° V-twin engine
  - 141 lb⋅ft (191 N⋅m) torque @ 3,000 rpm (claimed)
    121.4 lb⋅ft (164.6 N⋅m) (rear wheel)
  - 116 hp (87 kW) @ 5,000 rpm (claimed)
    96.8 hp (72.2 kW) (rear wheel)
  - Belt drive
  - Electronic engine control unit (ECU) with fuel injection
  - Forged pistons and alloy connecting rods
  - Steel double-cradle frame with box-section single-tube backbone for strength
  - Dual 300 mm front disc brakes with four-piston calipers and single rear two-piston disc brakes

=== 2006–present: Vulcan 900 series ===
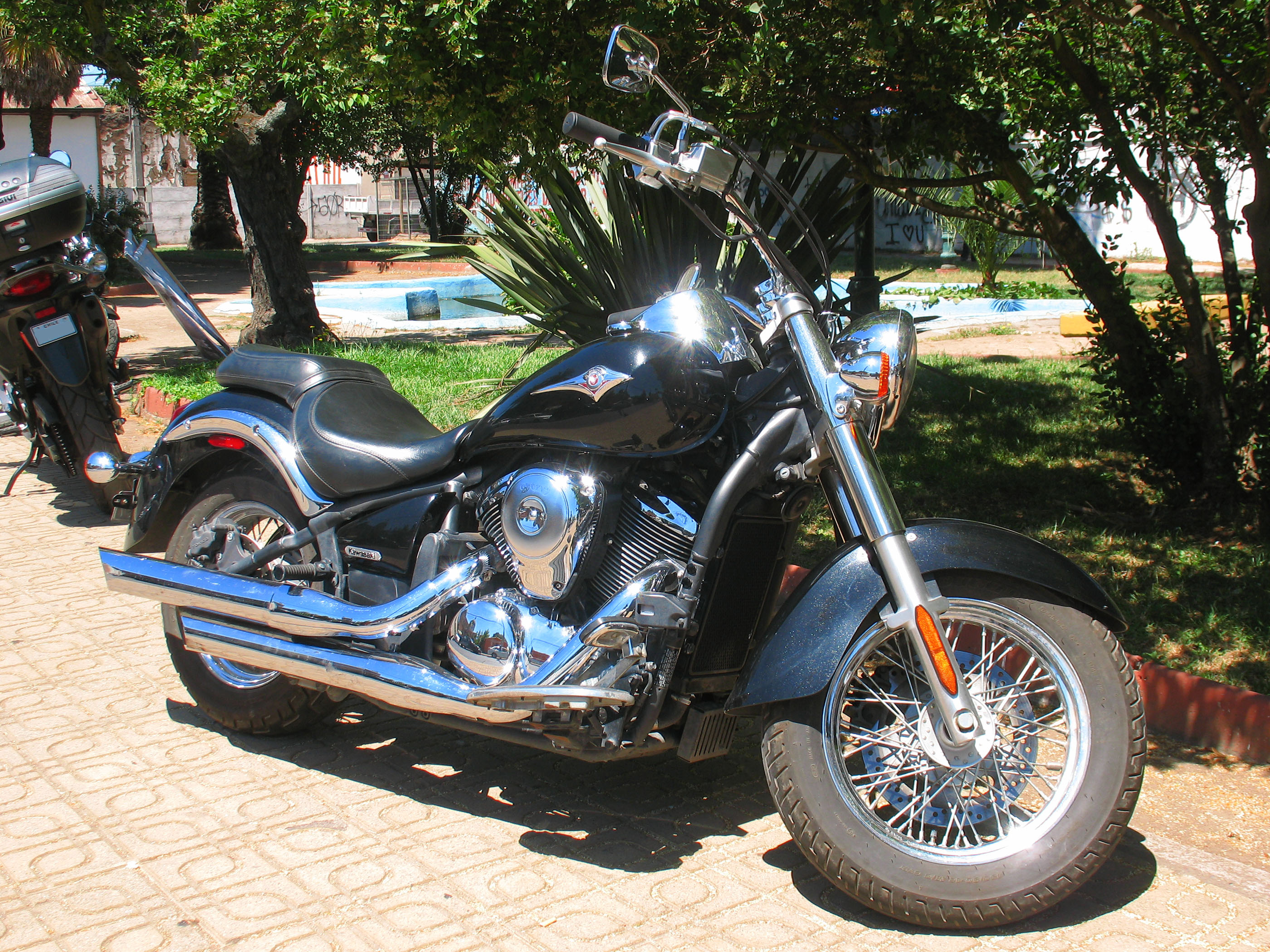
Vulcan 900

- Vulcan 900 Classic
  - 903 cc (55.1 cu in) Liquid Cooled Fuel injected V-twin SOHC engine
  - 50 HP @ 5,700 RPM
  - 45.4 ft-lb TQ @ 3,500 RPM
  - Belt drive
  - Four-valve Cylinder Head
  - Tank-Mounted Speedometer with Turn Signal Indicators and Caution Lamps
- Vulcan 900 Classic LT
  - Same as the Classic, with the addition of:
    - Passenger backrest, saddlebags, windshield, and studded accents standard
- Vulcan 900 Custom
  - Same as the Classic, except for:
    - 180 mm rear tire, and a thin 21-inch cast front wheel
    - Smaller, lower-profile seat with smaller pillion
    - Drag-Style handlebars

=== 2009–present: Vulcan 1700 series ===
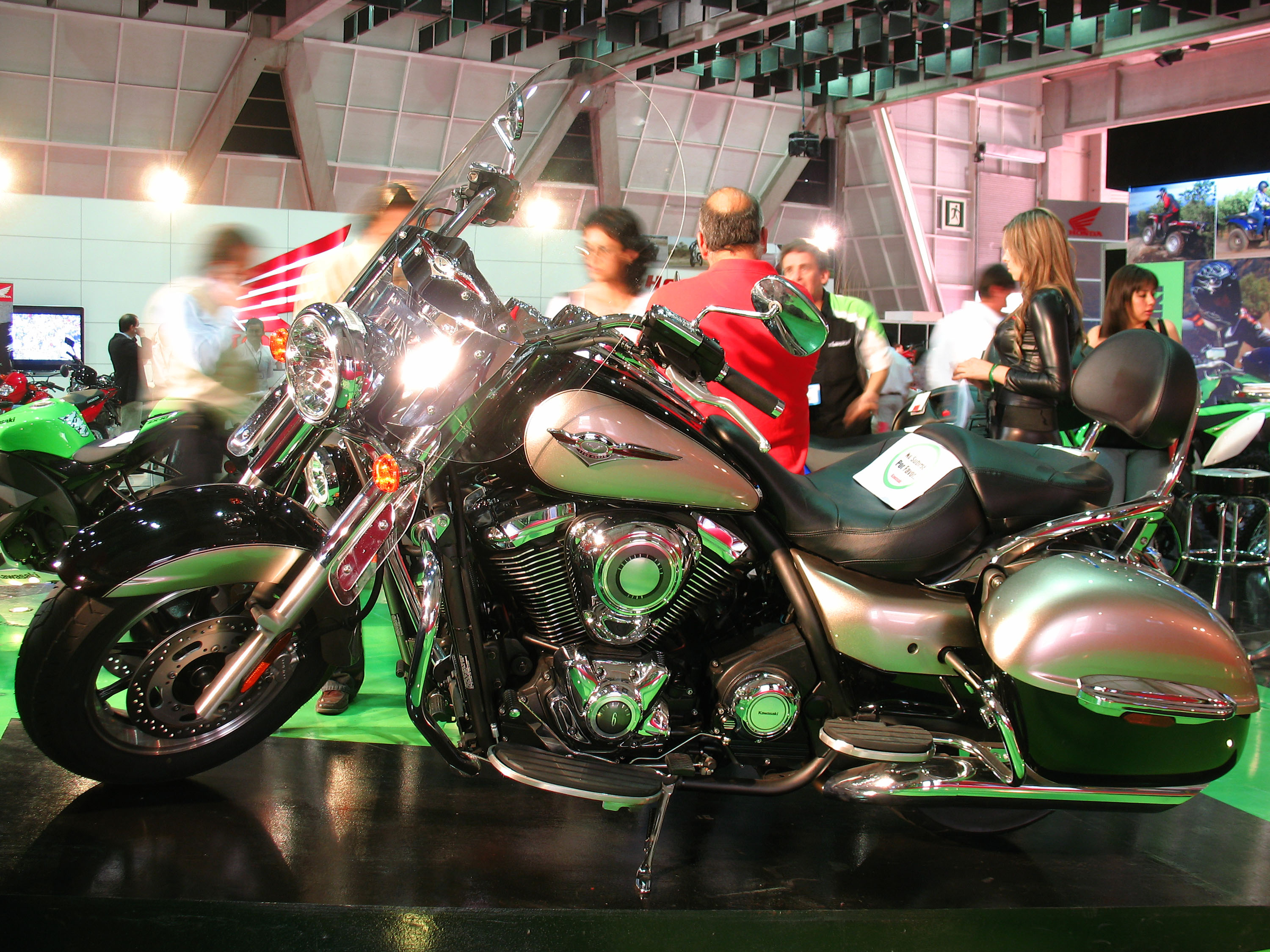
Vulcan 1700 Nomad

- Vulcan 1700 Classic
  - 1,700 cc (104 cu in) 52° SOHC liquid-cooled fuel-injected V-twin engine
  - Six-speed transmission
  - "ride-by-wire" throttle
- Vulcan 1700 Classic LT
  - 1,700 cc (104 cu in) 52° SOHC liquid-cooled fuel-injected V-twin engine
  - Six-speed transmission
  - ride-by-wire throttle, windshield and leather saddlebags
- Vulcan 1700 Nomad
  - 1,700 cc (104 cu in) 52° SOHC liquid-cooled fuel-injected V-twin engine
  - Six-speed transmission
  - "ride-by-wire" throttle, windshield and hard saddlebags
  - Discontinued after the 2016 model year.
- Vulcan 1700 Voyager
  - 1,700 cc (104 cu in) 52° SOHC liquid-cooled fuel-injected V-Twin Engine
  - Six-speed transmission
  - Discontinued after the 2025 model year.
- Vulcan 1700 Vaquero
  - Since 2011.
