= Kawasaki KE100 =

KE100
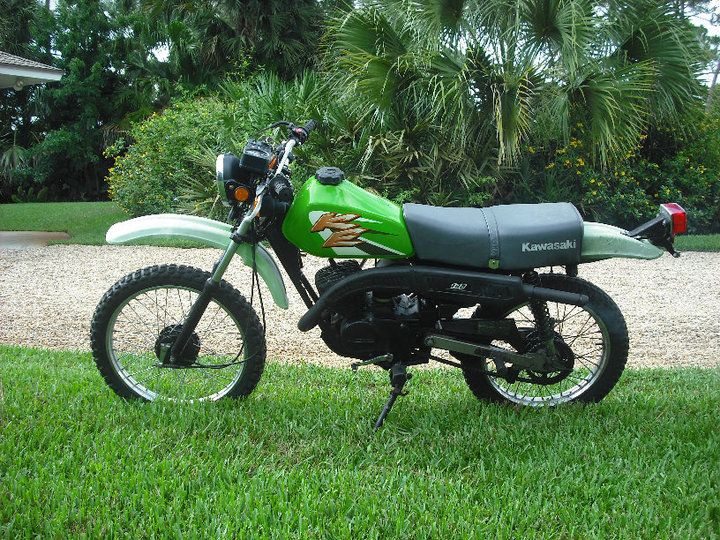
- Manufacturer: Kawasaki Motors
- Parent company: Kawasaki Heavy Industries
- Production: 1974–2001
- Predecessor: Kawasaki G5
- Class: Dual Sport
- Engine: 99 cc (6.0 cu in), air-cooled, oil-injected, two-stroke, single
- Top speed: 62.5 mph (100.6 km/h)
- Power: 11 hp (8.2 kW) at 7,000 rpm
- Torque: 8.9 lb⋅ft (12.1 N⋅m) at 3,500 rpm 8.0 lb⋅ft (10.8 N⋅m) at 9,000 rpm
- Transmission: 5-speed constant mesh wet-clutch with chain final drive
- Suspension: Front sealed hydraulic forks, Rear coil shocks with pneumatic struts
- Brakes: Front and rear mechanical drums (leading/trailing)
- Tires: Front: 2.75-19 Rear: 3.00-17
- Wheelbase: 50.6 in (1,290 mm)
- Dimensions: L: 79.9 in (2,030 mm); W: 33.5 in (850 mm); H: 42.5 in (1,080 mm)
- Seat height: 31.7 in (810 mm)
- Weight: 187 lb (85 kg) (dry); 197 lb (89 kg) (wet)
- Fuel capacity: 2.5 US gal (9.5 L; 2.1 imp gal)
- Oil capacity: 1.2 L (1.3 US qt)
- Fuel consumption: 70-85 mpg US

The Kawasaki KE100 is a dual-sport motorcycle that was produced by Kawasaki from 1976 to 2001. A direct successor to the G5, the major changes on the KE100 were different ergonomics and a change in transmission layout (1-N-2-3-4-5 to the G5's N-1-2-3-4-5). The KE100 did not change much through the years, although minor changes were made to the engine and transmission over successive model years, as well as a switch to different tanks after the B4 model. It uses an oil injection system that Kawasaki calls superlube to both eliminate fuel-mixing and give a precise fuel-oil mixture in the two-stroke cycle, reducing emissions enough that the KE100 kinda passes US emissions tests. Its fuel tank has a capacity of 2.5 US gal (9.5 L; 2.1 imp gal) and includes two small hooks on the rear of the frame that can be used either to mount turn signals or to tie or "bungee" a spare fuel tank for longer journeys.
