= Kawasaki Vulcan 900 Classic =

Kawasaki cruiser motorcycle

Vulcan 900 Classic
- Manufacturer: Kawasaki Motors
- Parent company: Kawasaki Heavy Industries
- Production: 2006–Present
- Class: Boulevard Cruiser

The Kawasaki Vulcan 900 Classic motorcycle (Model VN900B) is a mid-sized motorcycle cruiser made by Kawasaki, first introduced in 2006. The cycle follows the formula of a smaller yet capable engine fitted into a one-size up frame, a popular combination also in use by Honda, Suzuki, and Yamaha in their respective cruiser lines.

== Overview ==
The VN900B is a boulevard-style cruiser, similar in appearance to the Harley-Davidson Softail Deluxe or the Fat Boy. It is powered by a liquid cooled 903 cc (55.1 cu in) in V-Twin engine, with a five speed transmission. Overall, it measures 97.0 inches (2.46 m) in length, has a wheelbase of 64.8 inches (1.65 m), and possesses a seat height off the ground of 26.8 inches (680 mm).

Other installed standard equipment are a 5.3 US gallons (20 L; 4.4 imp gal) tank (also the largest in its class), floorboards, front and rear disk brakes, electronic fuel injection, and a belt for the final drive. Up until September 2008, the engine displacement of the Vulcan 900 lineup was the largest in the midsized cruiser game. This changed with the introduction of Yamaha's V-Star 950 (both standard and touring models), which uses an air-cooled 942 cc powerplant.

== Press and owner reviews ==
Upon its unveiling, the press generally regarded the VN900B favorably. Numerous references were made to its physical presence, aesthetics, and it possessing equipment normally reserved for larger bore machines. Ride quality was also rated positively, as was its ability to accommodate shorter riders due to the low seat height. Countering these were mentions of limited cornering clearance (due to the floorboards), a relatively weak rear disc brake, and in some articles, an uncomfortable stock seat. In an overall online comparison review, the Suzuki C50 was identified as the potential equal to the VN900B, with the Vulcan being stronger in some areas, and weaker in others.

== Specifications ==
| Engine Type | 4-Stroke, Liquid-Cooled, SOHC, 4-Valve Cylinder Head, 55° V-Twin |
| Displacement | 903 cc |
| Bore and Stroke | 88 x 74.2 mm |
| Compression Ratio | 9.5:1 |
| Fuel Injection | EFI with 34 mm Keihin Throttle Bodies (X2) |
| Ignition | TCBI with Digital Advance |
| Transmission | 5-Speed |
| Final Drive | Belt |
| Rake/Trail | 32°/6.5 in. |
| Front Wheel Travel | 5.9 in. |
| Rear Wheel Travel | 3.9 in. |
| Front Tire Size | 130/90-16 |
| Rear Tire Size | 180/70-15 |
| Wheelbase | 65 in. |
| Front Suspension | 41mm Hydraulic Telescopic Fork |
| Rear Suspension | Single Shock |
| Front Brake Type | Single 300 mm Disc with 2-Piston Caliper |
| Rear Brake Type | Single 270 mm Disc |
| Fuel Tank Capacity | 5.3 gal. |
| Seat Height | 26.8 in |

== Variations ==
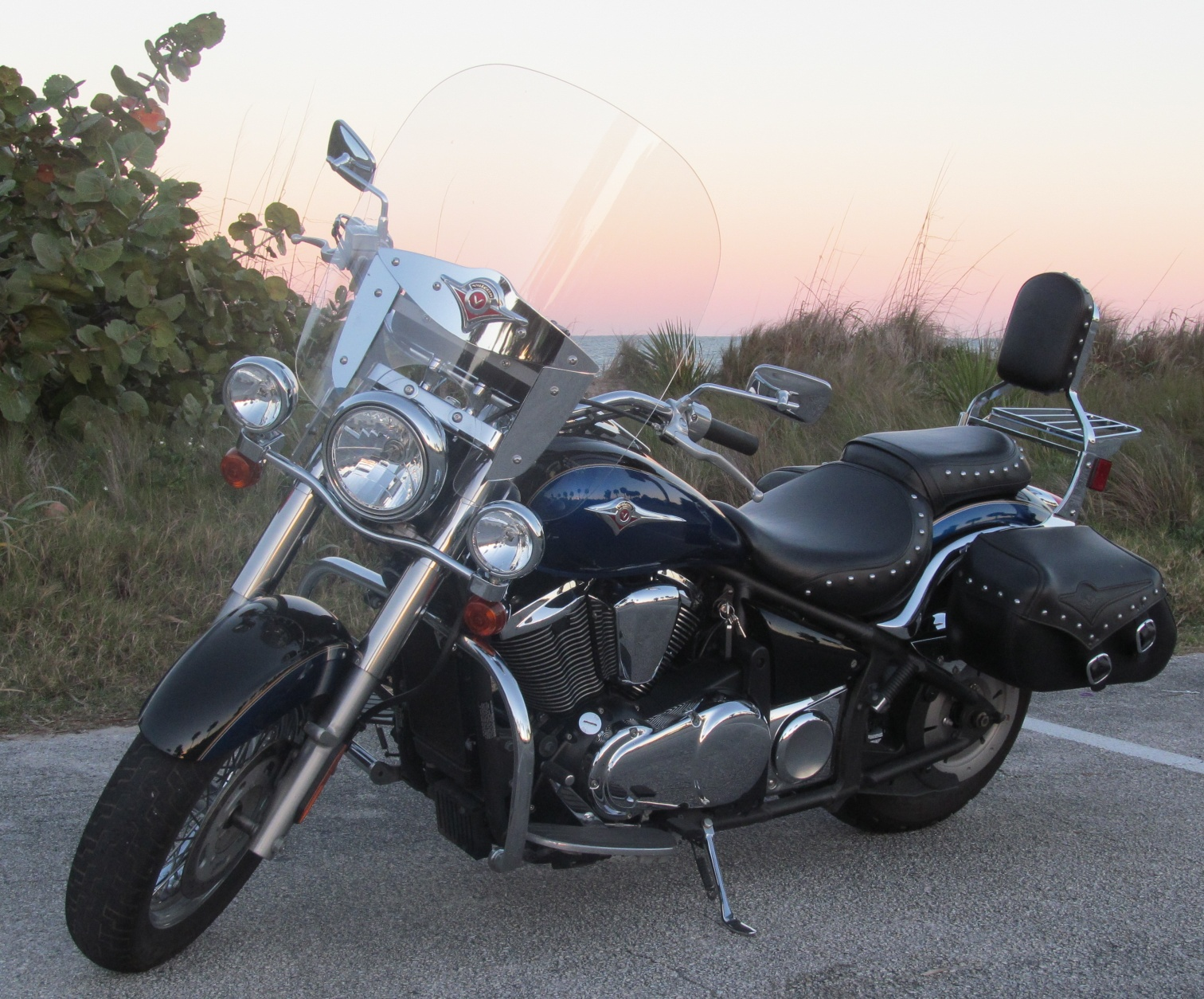
2009 VN900D (Classic LT)

The VN900D is the touring edition of the basic VN900B. The major additions made to accommodate this new role include factory installed windshield, saddlebags, and a backrest. Additionally, a studded seat replaces the standard unit.

Also available is the VN900C Custom, which is regarded as the more aggressively styled sister of the VN900B. Major changes are cast alloy wheels (solid on the rear, and spoked for the front), a much larger diameter 21 in 80/90 front wheel, redesigned fenders, forward controls with pegs (as opposed to floorboards), a smaller headlight, and drag-style bars. Also different is the slimmer one-piece seat, which is still capable of carrying a passenger, but not quite as comfortably as the VN900B.
