= Kawasaki KDX125 =

Kawasaki made KDX125 starting in 1990 with mode A1 and end in 1999 with model B6

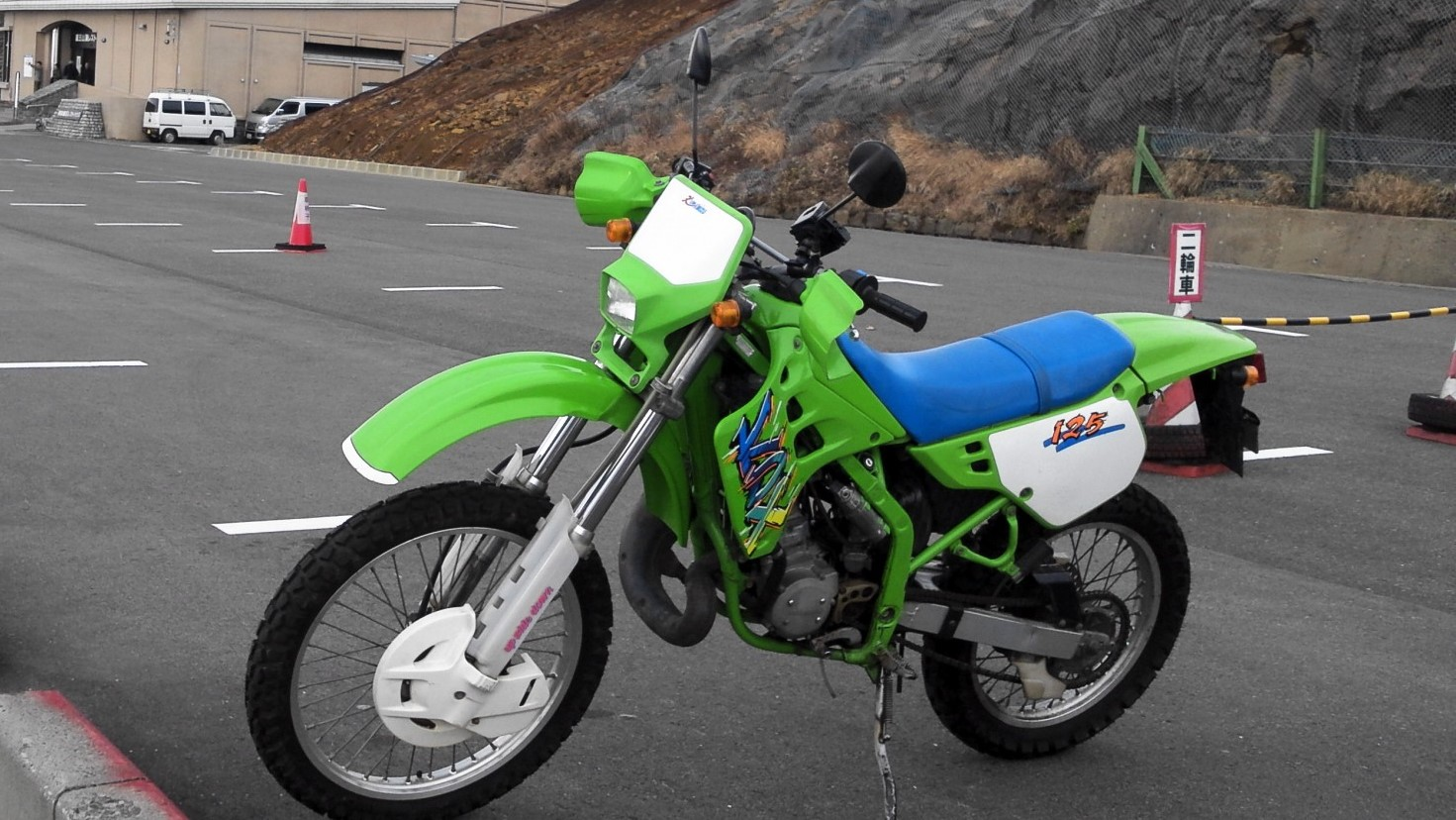
KDX125 A5

Kawasaki made the KDX125 starting in 1990 with model A1 and ending in 1999 with model B6, The KDX125 was a road going version of the KX125 and was known as the enduro version of the KMX125. With a dry weight of 104 kg (229 lb) and power output of 24 bhp (18 kW) the KDX125's two-stroke engine managed a top speed of 64 mph (103 km/h).. The full power model or derestricted version was capable of 80-85 mph and power increase from 12 - 24 bhp.This model was the 'B' version for anyone with a full bike licence. The 'A' model could be derestricted by cutting the washer from the downpipe or buying an after market down pipe. Unlike its sister bike the KMX the washer was hidden, no longer at the entry point, it's placed in the exhaust, around 35 cm back from the entry, restricting gas outflow.... The kmx was more comfortable.. as quick ..cheaper, easier to derestrict, and more common ...with its slightly lighter 99 kg dry weight ..
