= Kawasaki Z series =

Series of motorcycles made by Kawasaki

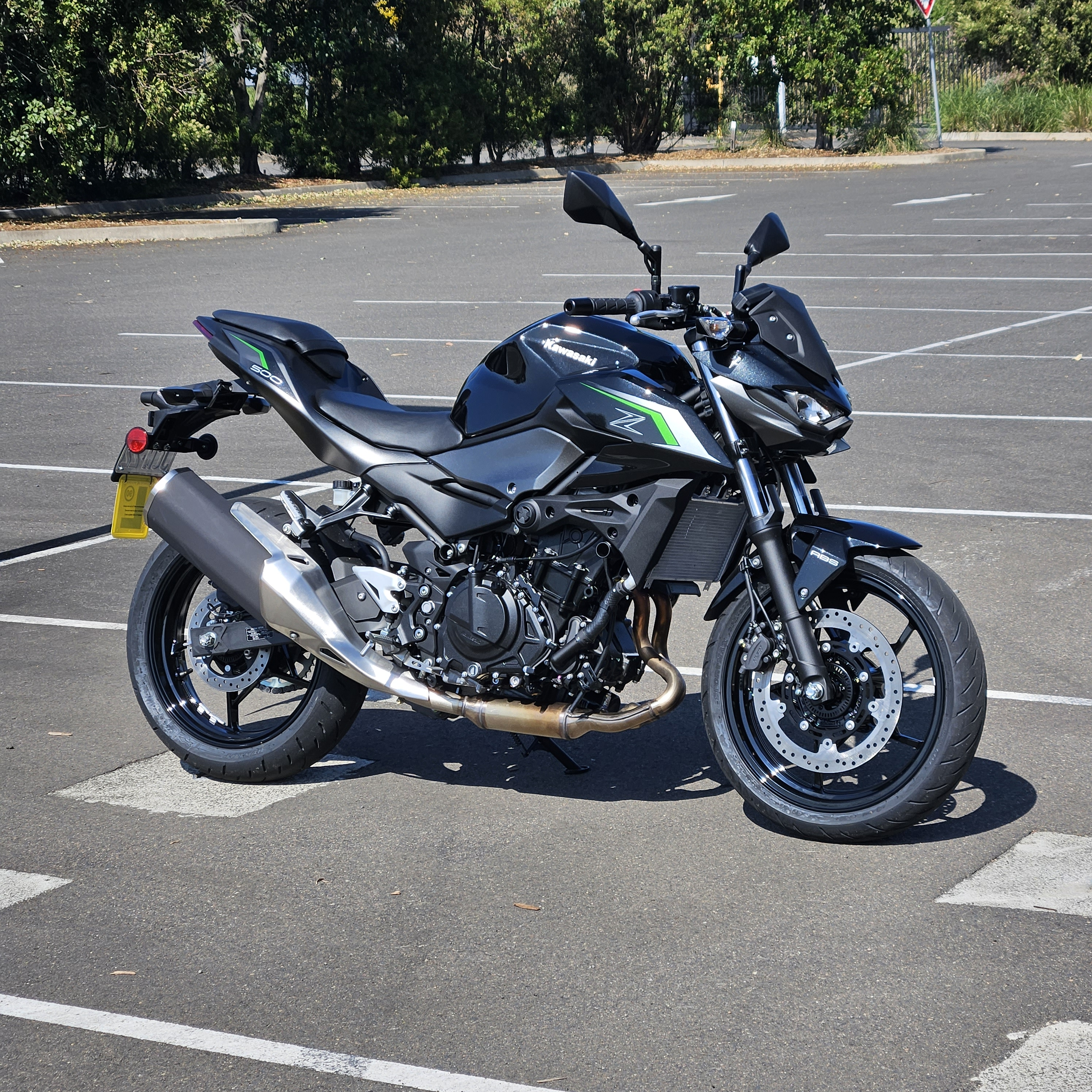
2024 Kawasaki Z500

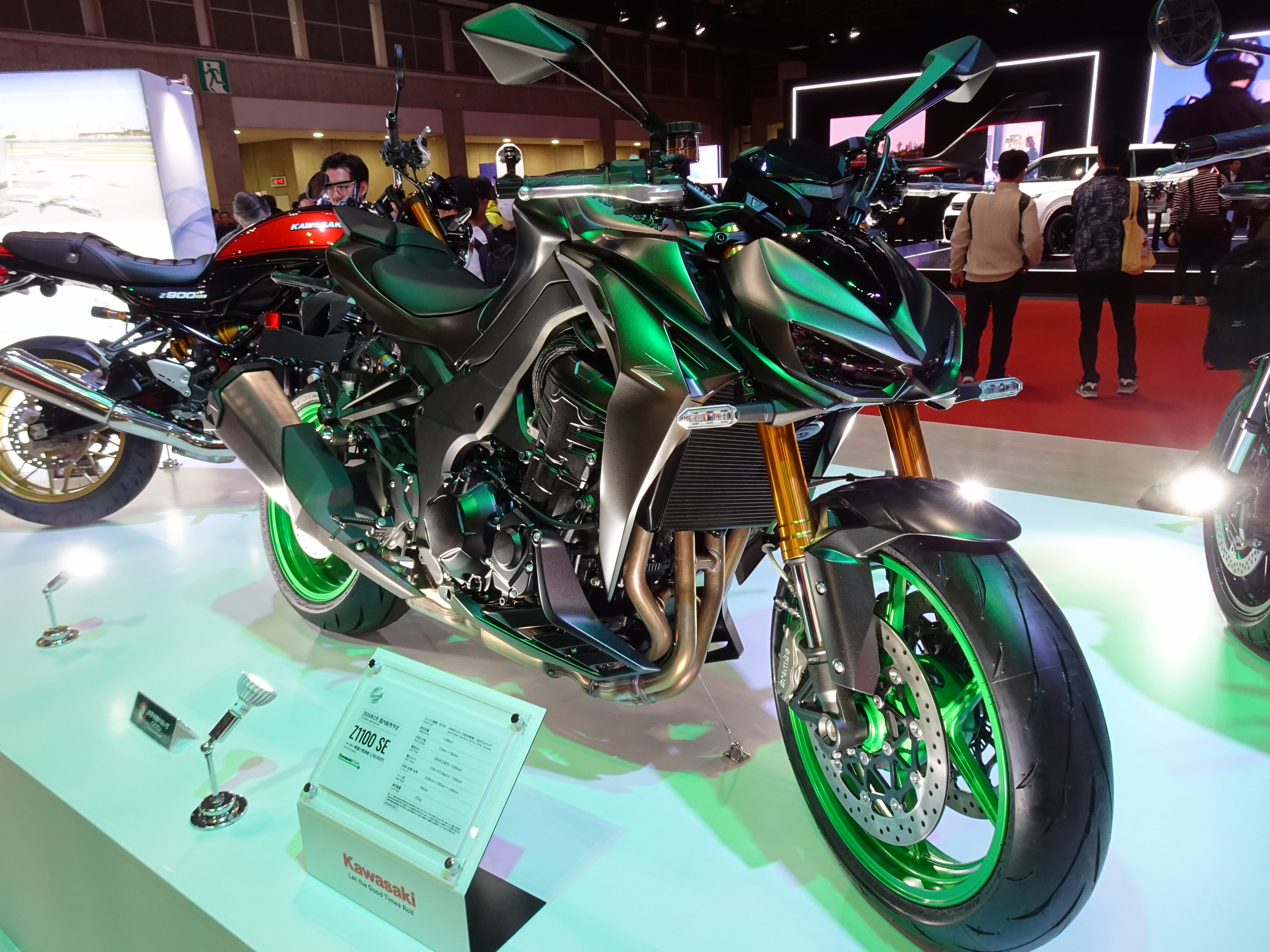
2026 Kawasaki Z1100 SE

The Kawasaki Z series is a family of standard/naked bikes manufactured by Kawasaki since 1972.

== Models ==
=== Single cylinder ===
- Z125 (2018–present)
- Z200/KZ200 (1977–1984)
- Z250/C/LTD (1979–1982)
- Z250SL (2014–present)

=== Parallel-twin ===
- Z250 (2013–present)
- Z300 (2014–2018)
- Z400/KZ400 (1974–1984)
- Z400 (2018–present)
- Z500 (2024-present)
- Z650 (2017–present)
- Z750 twin (1976–1979)

=== Inline-four ===
- Z400-J/KZ400-J (1980–1983)
- Z500/Z550 (1979–1985)
- Z650 (1976–1983)
- Z750 (1973–1978)
- Z750 (2004–2013)
- Z800 (2013–2016)
- Z900/KZ900 (1976–1977)
- Z900 (2017–present)
- Z1000/KZ1000 (1977–2005)
- Z1000 (2003–2016)
- Z1100 (1980–1986)
- Z1100 SE (2026-present)
- Z1 (1972–1975)
- Z H2 (2020–present)

=== Inline-six ===
- Z1300 (1979–1989)

=== Electric ===
- Z e-1

== See also ==
- Kawasaki KZ750L3 (1976–1987)
- Kawasaki Zephyr (1989–2000)
- Kawasaki ZRX1100 (1997–2005)
- Kawasaki ZRX1200R (2001–2008)
- Kawasaki ZR-7 (1999–2005)
- Kawasaki GPZ series (1981–2009)
- Kawasaki Ninja (1984–present)
