= Honda CB650 =

CB650
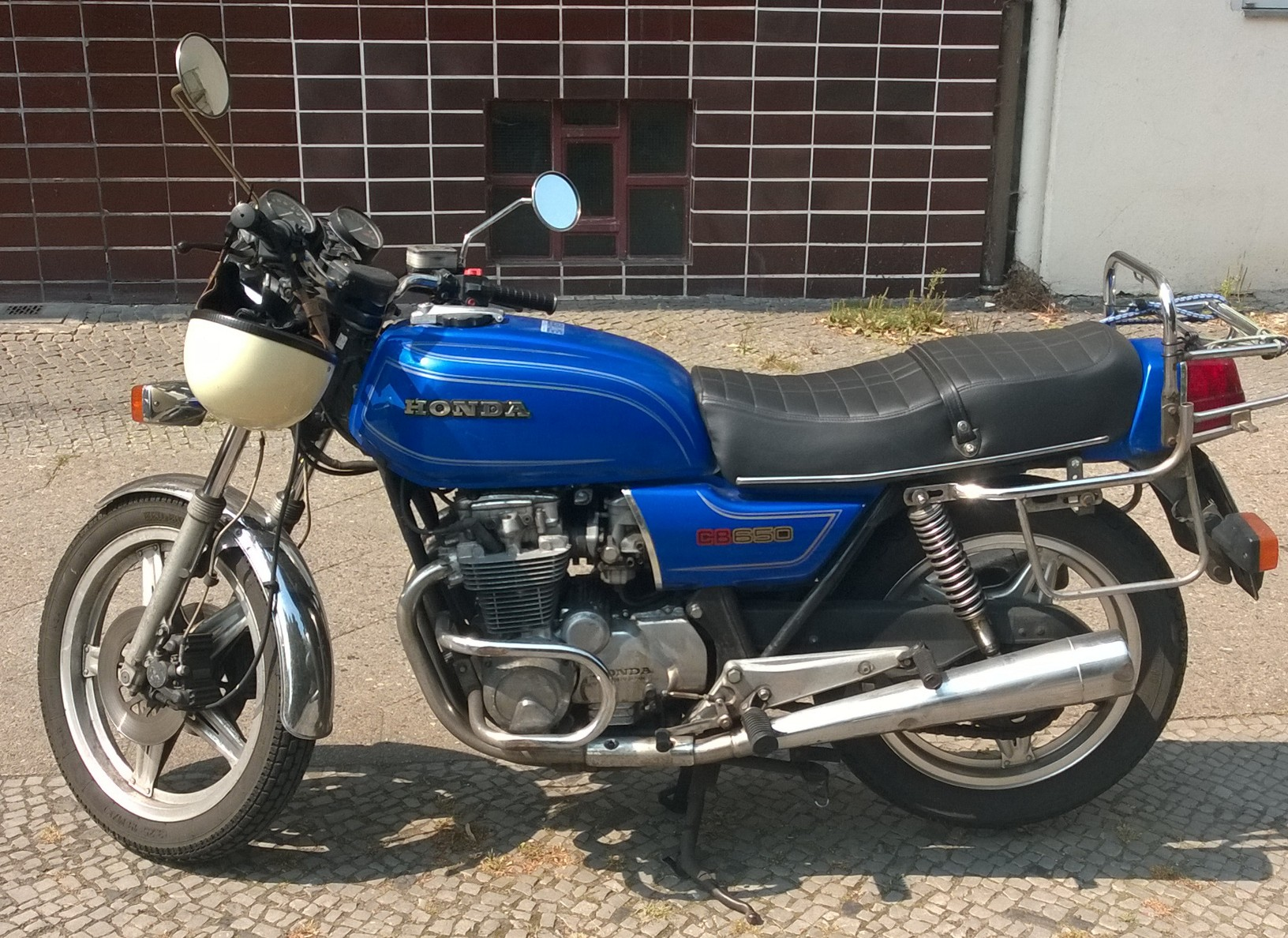
- Honda CB650K
- Manufacturer: Honda
- Production: 1979–1985
- Predecessor: Honda CB550
- Successor: Honda CB650F
- Class: Standard
- Engine: 627 cc (38.3 cu in), air-cooled, 8-valve, SOHC, transverse four
- Bore / stroke: 59.8 mm × 55.8 mm (2.35 in × 2.20 in)
- Compression ratio: 9.0:1
- Power: 63 hp (47 kW) @ 9,000 rpm
- Transmission: 5-speed, manual, chain final drive
- Suspension: Front: 35 mm telescopic forks Rear: Twin Showa shocks with adjustable pre-load
- Brakes: Front: Single-caliper disc Rear: Drum
- Tires: Front: 3.25 x 19 in Rear: 3.75 x 18 in
- Weight: 467 lb (212 kg) (wet)

The Honda CB650 is a 627 cc (38.3 cu in) standard motorcycle produced from 1979 to 1985. It featured a four-cylinder, SOHC, air-cooled, wet sump engine, with two valves per cylinder. The CB650 was a development of the CB550, itself derived from the even earlier CB500. The CB650 was the last of Honda's successful series of air-cooled SOHC fours that began in 1969 with the Honda CB750.

== Model development ==
For cost-saving purposes, the CB650 was designed to be produced on the same production line as its CB550 predecessor, using the existing tooling. The CB650's cylinder block was a new design, but it shared the stud holes of the earlier bike, which may explain why the bike could not be a full 650cc machine. Likewise, the frame was almost identical to that of the CB550. Handlebar levers and instruments (speedometer and tachometer) were also carried over from the earlier model. The CB650 produced a claimed 63 hp (47 kW) @ 9,000 rpm.

In 1980, the CB650 was re-styled but there were no significant mechanical changes. After 1981, the CB650 had a modified cylinder head and new CV vacuum carburettors, and the bike was now available in either Standard or custom configurations. The latter had "cruiser" styling with a teardrop tank, chromed air-box, and smaller side covers. The 1980–1982 Standard model featured 4-into-2 exhaust pipes, a black plastic headlight nacelle, and wire-spoked wheels. The custom model featured 4-into-4 exhaust, Comstar wheels, a chrome headlight nacelle, and in 1981, dual disc front brakes and air-assisted forks.

A second generation model was produced from 1982 to 1985. In 1982, replacing the Custom, the new Nighthawk featured a re-designed tank and side covers, while the 1982 Standard model remained largely unchanged. In 1983, the SOHC engine was replaced by a new rubber-mounted DOHC engine featuring hydraulic valve-lash adjusters; and final drive was changed from chain to shaft-drive.

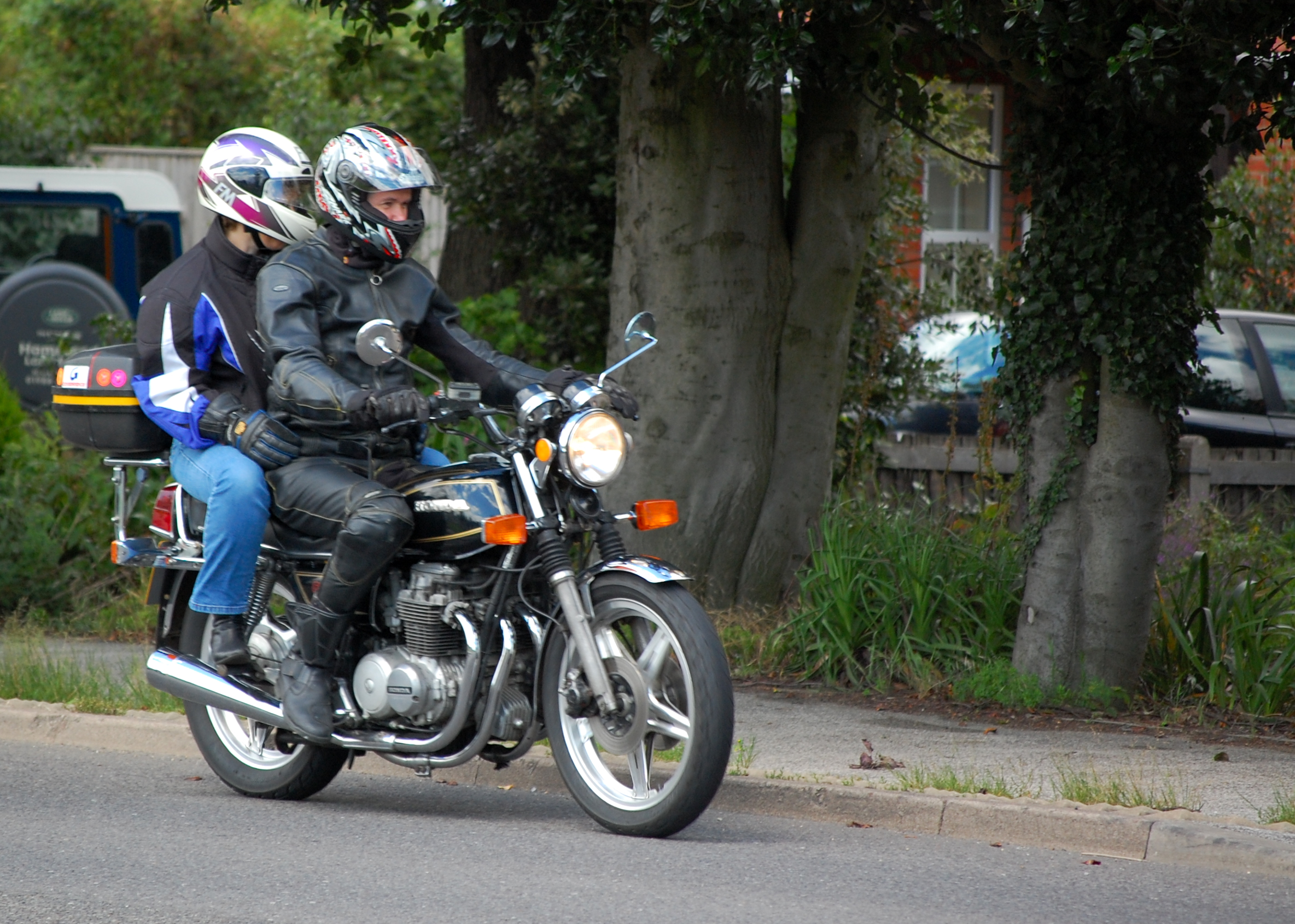
CB650 standard, two-up

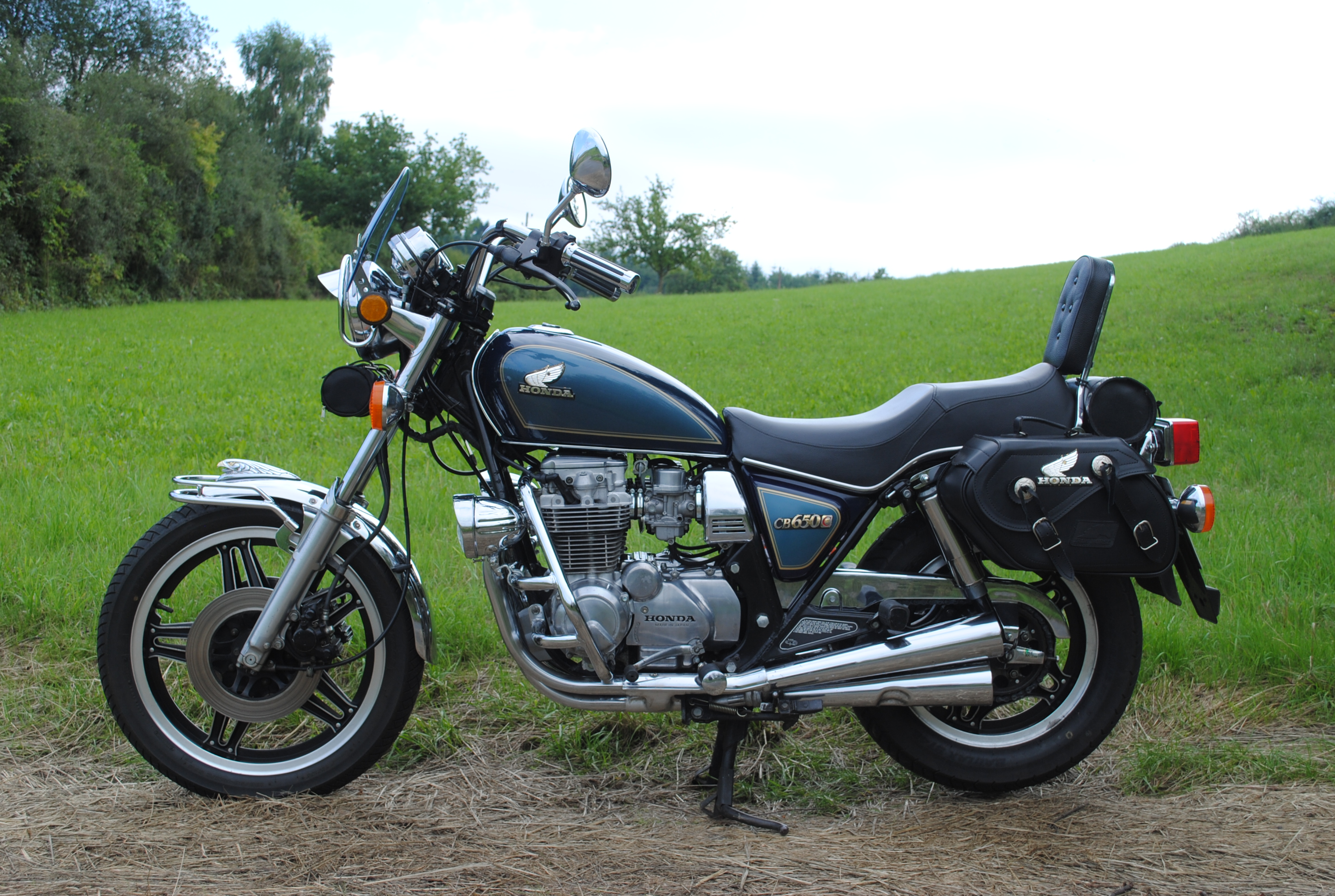
CB650C Custom

== See also ==
Honda CB series
