= Binter =

Binter may refer to:

- "Binter", nickname of the Kawasaki KZ200 motorcycle
- Two airlines, both subsidiaries of Iberia LAE, both airlines flew CN-235's :
  - Binter Canarias
  - Binter Mediterraneo, acquired by Air Nostrum, another Iberia subsidiary, in 1998 and absorbed its operations. It replaced the remaining CN-235's with ATR 72's.
