= Kawasaki Z650 (2017) =

- 2026 Kawasaki Z650
- Manufacturer: Kawasaki
- Production: 2017–present
- Predecessor: Kawasaki Ninja 650R
- Class: Naked bike

The Kawasaki Z650 is a naked motorcycle produced by Kawasaki Motors. It was introduced in 2016 as part of its Z series and entered production the following year, succeeding the Kawasaki Ninja 650R.

== History ==
The Z650 was presented in November 2016 at EICMA together with the Kawasaki Z900. It is named in reference to the four-cylinder motorcycle of the same name also built by Kawasaki in 1976 and was then introduced on the market in Europe at the beginning of 2017. The Z650 was created as a cheaper model than the larger Z900, from which it takes the design and some aesthetic elements.

A renewed version was introduced at EICMA in November 2019, characterized by a new saddle, instruments and lights now fully LED instead of the previous halogen headlights.

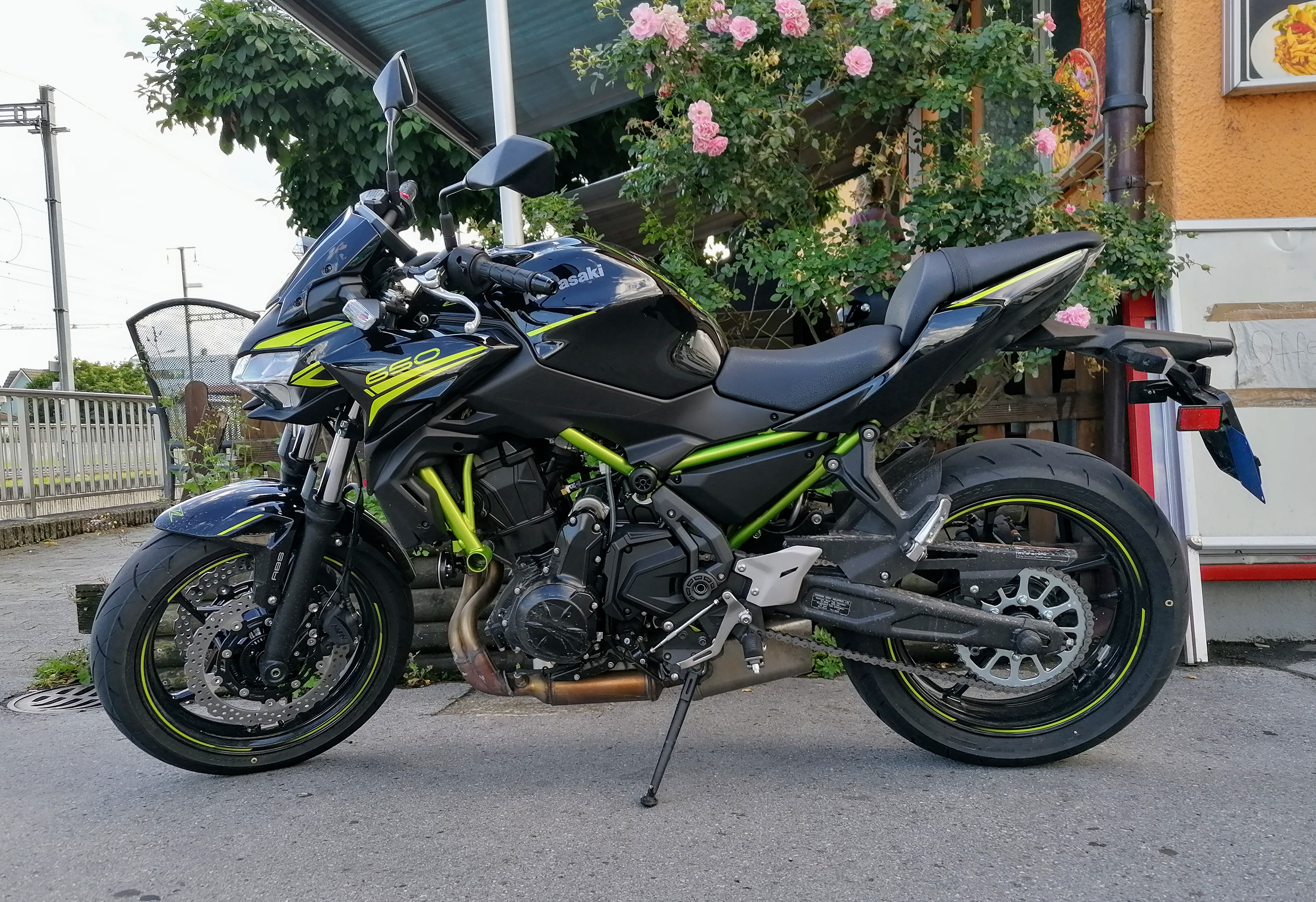
2020 Kawasaki Z650

In October 2020, it underwent a further engine update, to meet the Euro 5 emissions standard, which would be fulfilled two years later. In 2022, the Z650 received new traction control, a new LED lighting system, a new ignition lock and new colors.

=== Z650 RS ===
After Kawasaki had already offered the original Z650 (with a four-cylinder in-line engine with 49 kW (66 hp) and a mass of 220 kg) in 1976, the machine, externally similar to the 1976 model, has also been available as a Z650 RS retro version since the summer of 2022 as a parallel twin. The top speed is 191 km/h (119 mph). The RS also has analogue instruments.
