= Honda CB650 custom =

Honda CB650 Custom
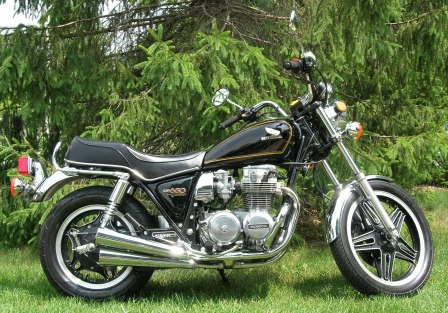
- 1980 Honda CB650 Custom
- Manufacturer: Honda
- Production: 1980–1981
- Successor: Honda CB650SC
- Class: Standard or street
- Engine: 627 cc (38.3 cu in) SOHC air-cooled straight four (1980–1981)
- Bore / stroke: 59.88 mm × 55.8 mm (2.357 in × 2.197 in)
- Compression ratio: 9:1
- Transmission: 5-speed manual
- Suspension: Front: Low-stiction hydraulic fork, 5.6 in. travel Rear: Two-stage damping shocks
- Brakes: Front 10.8" disc / Rear 7.1" drum
- Tires: Front: 3.50S19; Rear: 130/90 16 67S
- Rake, trail: 4.76 in (121 mm)
- Wheelbase: 58.3 in (1,480 mm)
- Dimensions: L: 87.2 in (2,210 mm); W: 34.3 in (870 mm); H: 45.5 in (1,160 mm)
- Seat height: 30.1 in (760 mm)
- Fuel capacity: 3.6 US gal (14 L; 3.0 imp gal) including 0.9 US gal reserve

The CB650 custom is a motorcycle made by Honda between 1980 and 1981, ending as the CB650 LC "Luxury Custom" in 1982.

The styling features that separated the custom from the standard CB650 are:

- Highlighted, black Honda ComStar wheels
- 4-4 exhaust pipes
- Pull-back "wheelbarrow" handle bars
- Extended front air-forks
- Vibration-resistant mirrors
- Custom side-emblems
- Chrome covered rear-shocks

The CB650LC was a Japan-only variant released in 1982 with slightly lower overall height and ground clearance, with hydraulic double disc front brakes and modified rear fairing.
