= Kawasaki Z750 twin =

Historic Japanese motorcycle

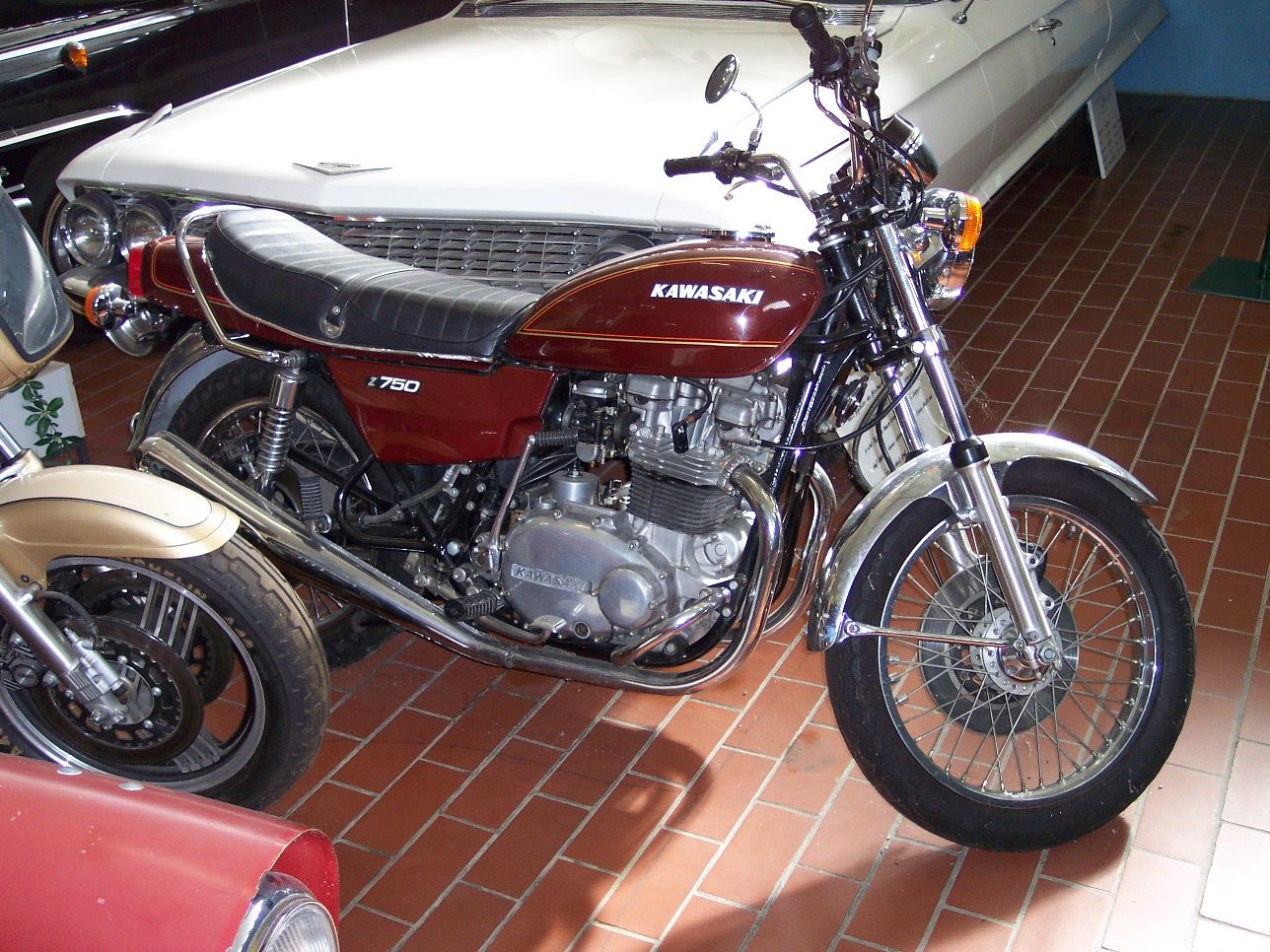
- Manufacturer: Kawasaki
- Parent company: Kawasaki Heavy Industries
- Production: 1975–1979
- Engine: 745 cc (45.5 cu in) air-cooled, four-stroke, twin cylinder
- Bore / stroke: 78 mm × 78 mm (3.1 in × 3.1 in)
- Frame type: Tubular Steel, heavily gusseted, double cradle
- Brakes: Single disc front and rear
- Wheelbase: 57 inches
- Dimensions: L: 85 inches W: 32 inches H: 45 inches
- Fuel capacity: 3.2 Imperial gallons (14.5 litres)
- Related: Kawasaki KZ400

The Kawasaki KZ750B twin is a twin-cylinder, touring motorcycle announced in 1975 and manufactured from 1976 to 1979. It was based on the smaller Kawasaki KZ400 introduced in 1975.

The air cooled engine shared similar engine design with the KZ400 having chain-driven twin dynamic balancer shafts. The valve seats were hardened to allow use of low-grade fuel.

The machine was engineered to have a wide power band and smooth torque curve.
