= Kawasaki Z650 =

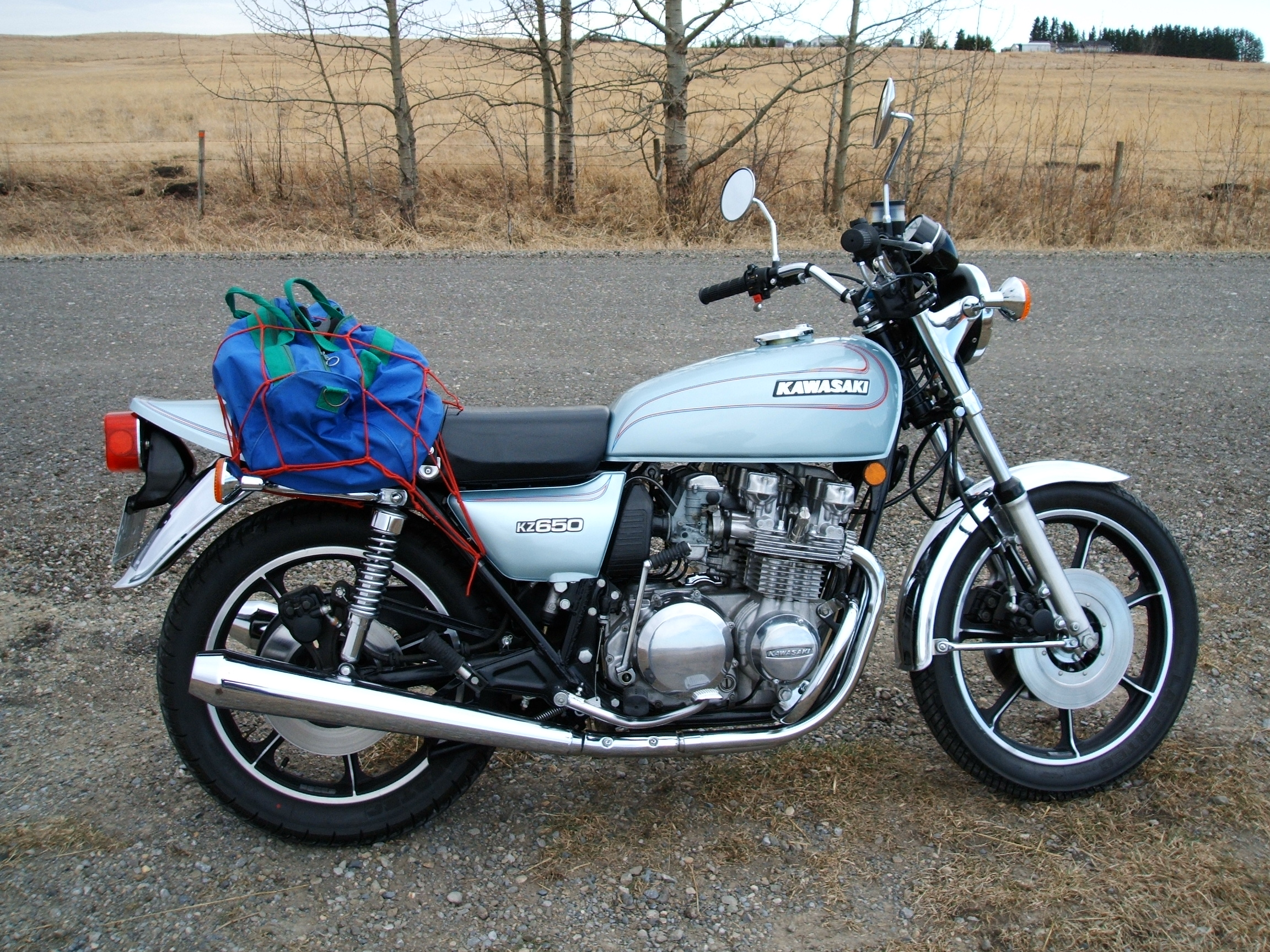
- KZ650C
- Manufacturer: Kawasaki Motorcycle & Engine Company
- Parent company: Kawasaki Heavy Industries
- Production: 1977-1983
- Class: standard
- Engine: 652 cc (39.8 cu in) inline four
- Bore / stroke: 62 mm × 54 mm (2.4 in × 2.1 in)
- Compression ratio: 9.5:1
- Top speed: 126 mph (203 km/h)
- Power: 64 hp (48 kW) @ 8,500 rpm (claimed)
- Ignition type: points, then CDI
- Transmission: 5-speed, chain final drive
- Frame type: double cradle frame
- Suspension: Front:36 mm telescopic forks Rear: twin rear shocks
- Brakes: Front: single or twin 275 mm (10.8 in) discs Rear: 180 mm (7.1 in) drum or disc
- Wheelbase: 1,420 mm (55.9 in)
- Weight: 465 lb (211 kg)1976-1977(dry); 493 lb (224 kg)1978-1981 (dry); 485 lb (220 kg) (wet)
- Fuel capacity: 16.8 L (3.7 imp gal; 4.4 US gal)

The Kawasaki Z650 (known as KZ650 in North America) was produced as a 652 cc (39.8 cu in) standard motorcycle by Kawasaki from 1976 until 1983. It had a four-cylinder four-stroke, DOHC, air-cooled, wet sump engine positioned across the frame with two valves per cylinder and a five-speed gearbox. Designed as a middleweight version of the Kawasaki Z900, the similar-styling had "an attenuated version of the traditional Kawasaki tail fairing". It competed in the market against the smaller SOHC Honda CB650. The Z650 was the epitome of the "Universal Japanese Motorcycle" (UJM).

It press-debuted in late 1976 when six US-specification machines were air-shipped from the Akashi works to the UK distributor near London, prior to the London Motorcycle Show. The bikes were assembled and road-shipped to Edinburgh, Scotland, by Kawasaki UK's road race transporter, to be road-tested by 30 assembled European journalists.

== Model development ==
The Z650's project leader was Ben Inamura, who designed the engine. In its seven-year history, the Z650 underwent a number of alterations, as follows:

=== 1977 Z650/KZ650 ===
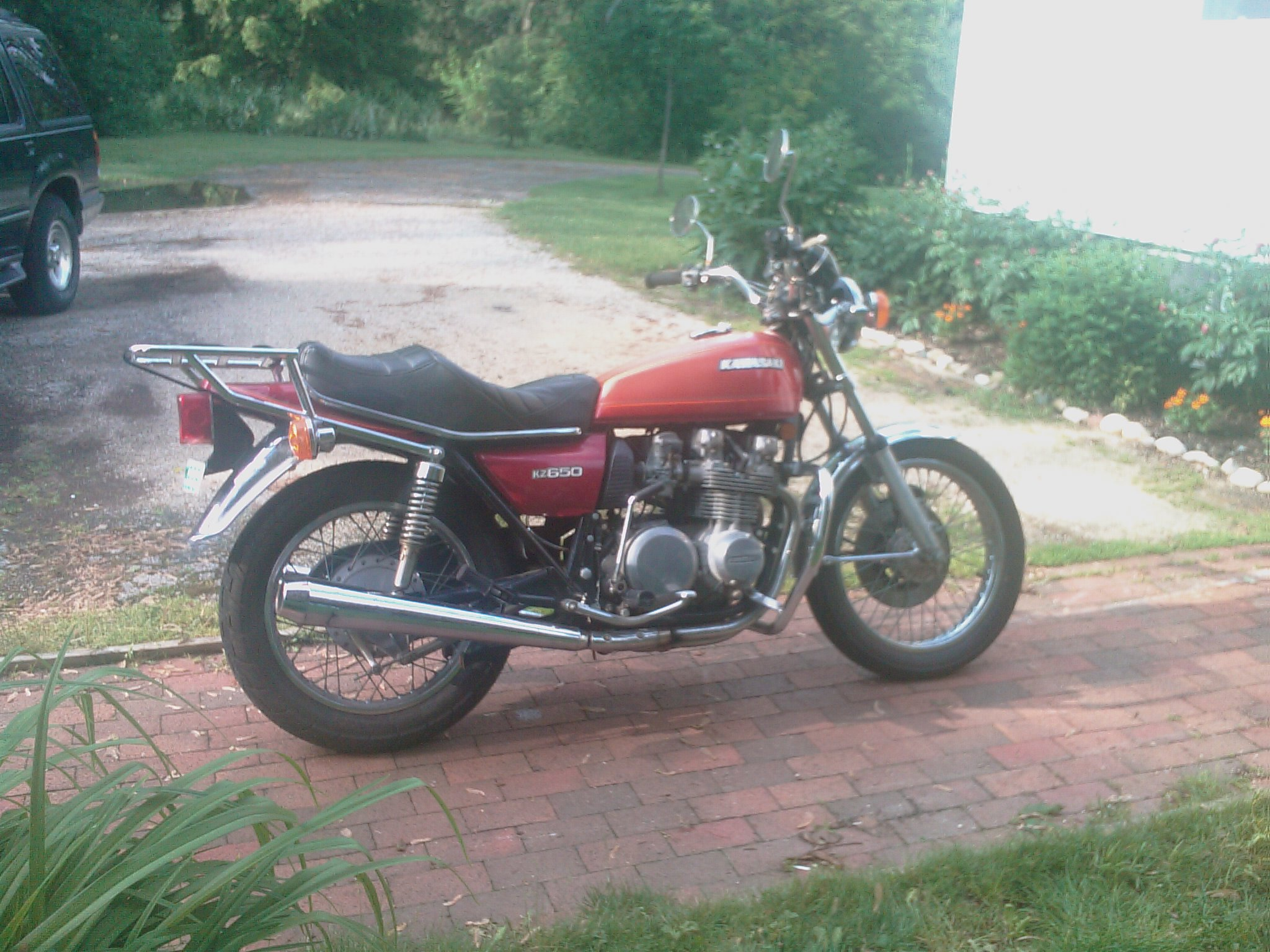
1977 KZ650 with aftermarket seat, wire-spoked wheels and drum rear brake

This first Z650 had a single front 275 mm disc brake and a 250 mm rear drum. Although the Z650's engine was based on the 900 cc (55 cu in) there were several differences: the 650 used a plain bearing crankshaft with a HyVo (or "Morse") chain primary drive instead of a gear drive, which necessitated the installation of a third (intermediate) shaft in the transmission to drive the input side of the clutch. Another departure from the Z1 engine design was the use of a shim-under-bucket method of setting valve clearances. (The Z1 engine's shim-over-bucket design caused some mishaps when its camshafts flicked the shims out of position, with consequent damage).

=== 1978 Z650/KZ650 ===
The front brake caliper was resited to the rear of the fork leg and the front master cylinder reservoir shape was changed. A hazard switch was added. Needle roller bearings were fitted to the swingarm instead of the earlier plain bushings. Tuning modifications were made to the carbs to improve low speed operation. The manual operation fuel tap was replaced with an automatic diaphragm unit. A rear disc brake replaced the earlier drum.

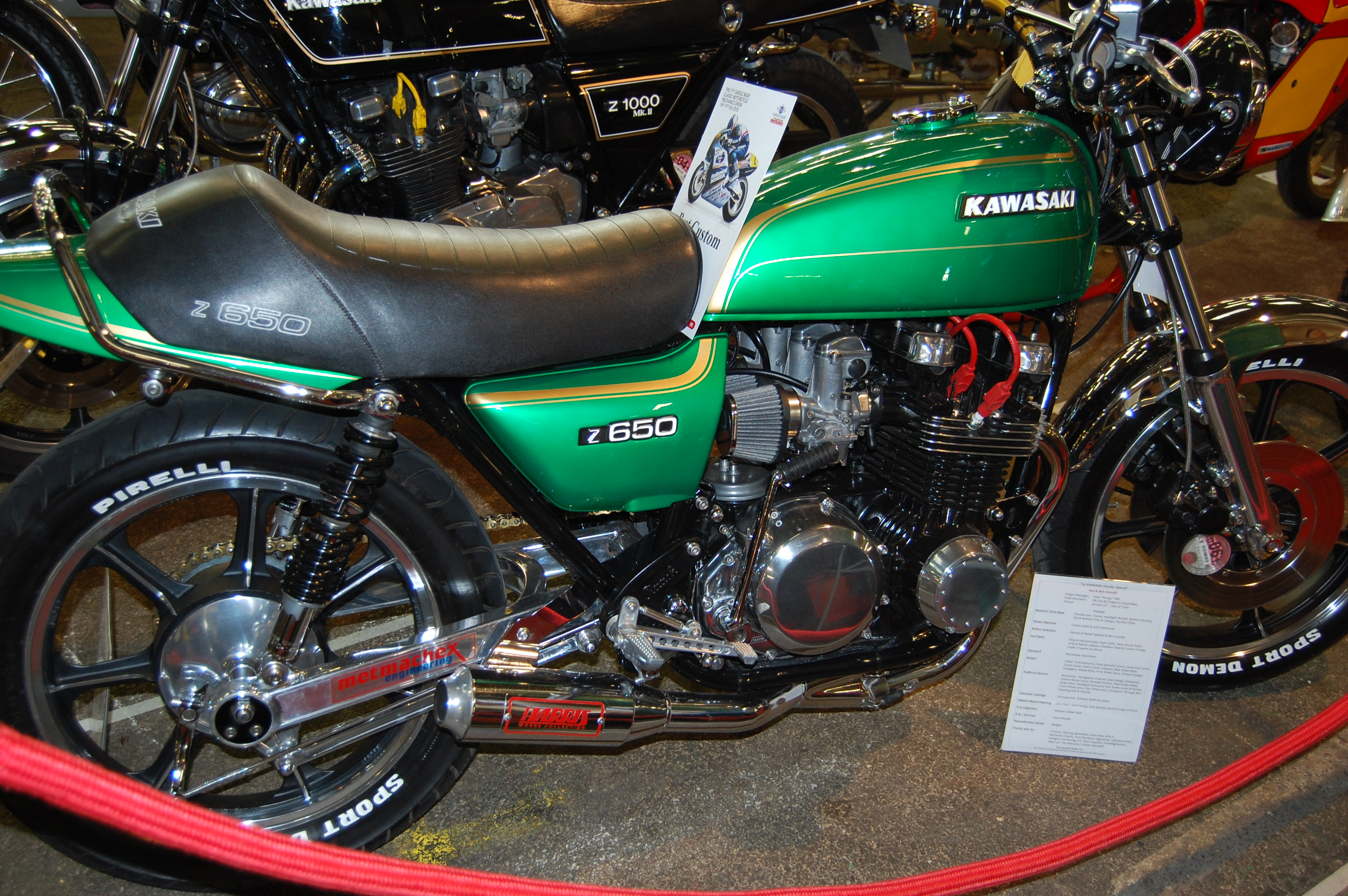
A customised Z650

=== 1979 Z650/KZ650 ===
This model had a self-adjusting (rather than manually-adjusted) camchain tensioner. For US-only models, an air injection system for emissions reduction was fitted. This model was the first Kawasaki to use all-weather sintered disc pads and drilled brake discs to improve braking in the wet. A derivative version, the KZ650SR had "chopper styling" with a fat 16-inch rear wheel.

=== 1980 Z650/KZ650 ===
A HyVo-type timing chain replaced the earlier roller chain. An "LTD" model became available with just a single front disc brake and a rear drum brake.

=== 1981 Z650/KZ650 ===
Electronic ignition (instead of points) was introduced. The front end from the 750E was grafted on meaning a change to the brakes, front wheel and clocks. The kick-starter was removed and a passenger grab rail was fitted. Larger 32mm Mikuni CV carbs were fitted, allowing the redline to be lifted from 9,000 to 9,500 rpm. A new generation of Kawasaki cruisers, the "CSR" was introduced.

=== 1982 Z650/KZ650 ===
Changes included new CV carbs, a clutch upgrade, modified fork internals, new switchgear, tail light, and different rear shocks.

=== 1983 Z650/KZ650 ===
Some minor updates including new pistons with four rings, and changes to the cylinder head and cover. After 1983 the KZ650 is surpassed by the GPZ models.

== See also ==
- Kawasaki Z series
