= Kawasaki Z1300 =

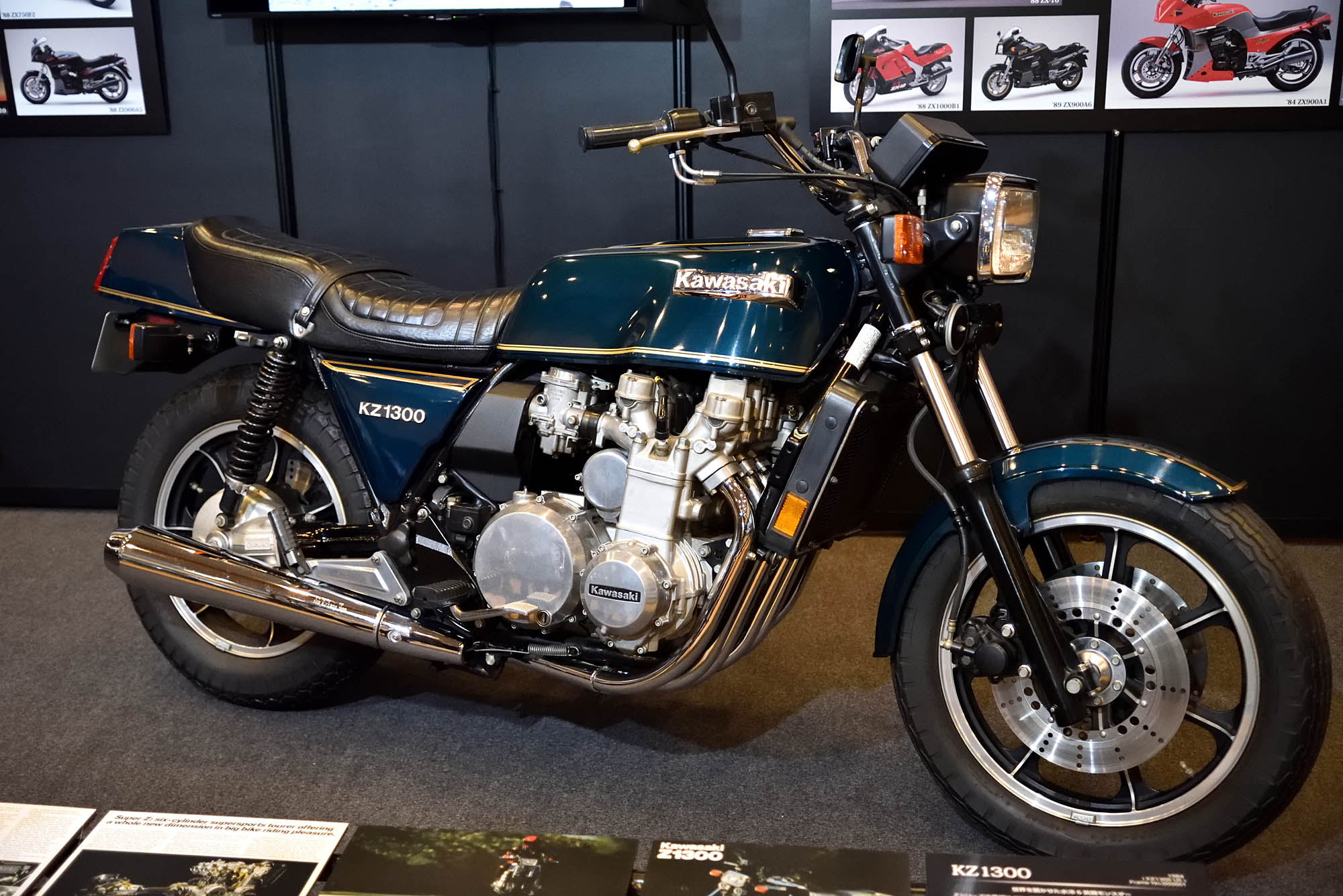
- Z1300 showing smooth engine water jacket and shaft drive to rear wheel
- Manufacturer: Kawasaki
- Also called: KZ1300, ZG1300, ZN1300.
- Parent company: Kawasaki Heavy Industries
- Production: 1979–1989
- Class: Standard
- Engine: 1,286 cc (78.5 cu in) 4-stroke DOHC water-cooled inline-6 with three Mikuni 32mm BSW32SS CV twin-choke carbs (1979 Z1300 A1 model)
- Bore / stroke: 62 mm × 71 mm (2.4 in × 2.8 in)
- Top speed: 222 km/h (138 mph)
- Power: 89 kW (120 hp) @ 8,000 rpm (claimed)
- Torque: 115 N⋅m (85 ft⋅lb) @ 6,000 rpm (claimed)
- Transmission: Multi-disc wet clutch, 5-speed, shaft drive
- Suspension: Front: telescopic air fork Rear: swingarm
- Brakes: Front: 2× 300 mm (11.9 in) disc Rear: 270 mm (10.8 in) disc
- Tires: Dunlop tubeless, Front: MN90-18; Rear: MT90-17
- Rake, trail: 28.5°, 100 mm (4.0 in)
- Wheelbase: 1,660 mm (65.2 in)
- Dimensions: H: 810 mm (32 in)
- Seat height: 810 mm (32 in)
- Weight: 314 kg (692 lb) (tank 1/2 full) (wet)
- Fuel capacity: 21 L; 4.7 imp gal (5.6 US gal)
- Fuel consumption: 5.56 L/100 km; 50.8 mpg_{‑imp} (42.3 mpg_{‑US})

The Kawasaki Z1300 is a standard motorcycle unusual for its large-displacement 1,300 cc inline -six engine made by Kawasaki from 1979 to 1989.

== Performance ==
Kawasaki Z1300's length is 89.1 inches, and its width is 30.9 inches, its height: 49.8 inches, the wheelbase is 62.2 inches, seat height is 31.2 inches, ground clearance is 5.5 inches, weight is 692 lbs.

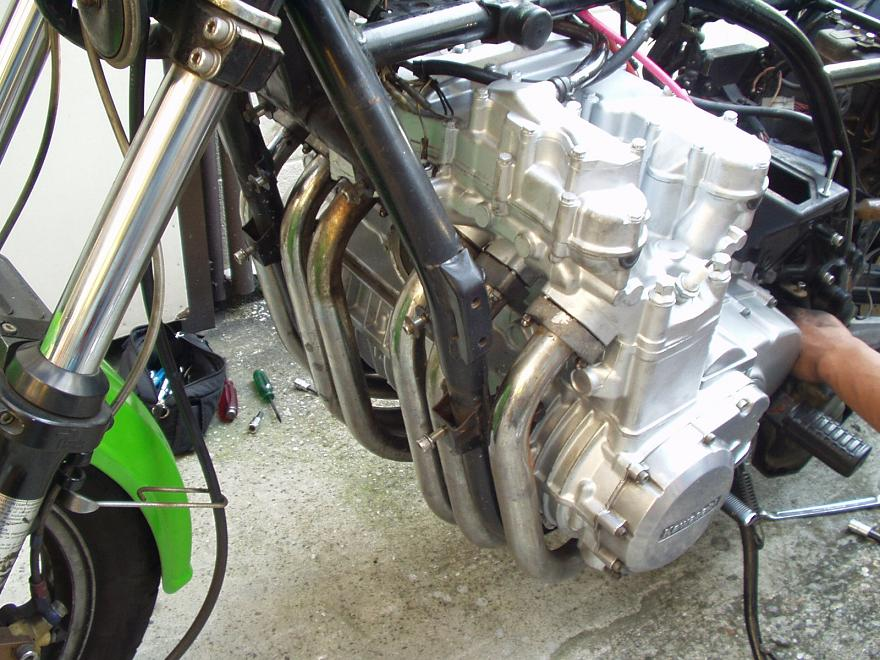
Z1300 straight-six engine

The Z1300 had six cylinders, water cooling, and shaft drive. The undersquare stroke of 71 mm (2.8 in) and bore of 62 mm (2.4 in) kept the engine width acceptable, but the high piston speed limited the maximum rpm figure. During its ten-year production run, fuelling was switched from carburetors to electronic fuel injection and suspension was upgraded to air systems front and rear. Fuel injection system was adopted primarily to improve fuel consumption, but as a bonus were increased power and torque.

Cycle World tested the 1979 KZ1300's 0 to 1/4 mile (0.00 to 0.40 km) time at 11.93 seconds at 114.79 mph (184.74 km/h) and 0 to 60 mph time at 4.01 seconds.

== Series ==
The Kawasaki Z1300 was manufactured in several versions, namely: Z1300, KZ1300, ZG1300 and ZN1300. It is the biggest model of the still-ongoing Z series that was started in 1972 with the Z1 (900). In the U.S., the model was equipped with a windshield, suitcase, and a redesigned frame. This new model was called "Voyager". In Europe, the traditional model was still available. The last 200 models (built in America as all Z1300 models were), built in 1989, have been called "Legendary Six", and were equipped with a special logo on the fuel tank to show that to the public. After a ten-year production run, Kawasaki's only liquid-cooled six-cylinder engine motorcycle was discontinued in 1989 after 20,000 KZ1300/Z1300 models and 4,500 Voyager models had been produced.

== History ==
=== Brand History ===
Kawasaki Motorcycle's history began in 1966. Kawasaki Motorcycle is a motorcycle produced by Kawasaki Heavy Industries' Motorcycle and Engine Division. Its first headquarters was located in an old meat warehouse, and started humble in the United States. Their initial focus was to realize their dreams and therefore did not focus on any fancy things to minimize management costs and use their finances for bicycle production. Three years after being listed in the United States, Kawasaki Motorcycle Company produced the Mach III 500cc two-stroke three-cylinder engine in 1969. This was a major turning point for Kawasaki Motorcycle Company. This invention changed the rules of the game in the industry in terms of performance and successfully won the international market. Nowadays, it is a world-renowned motorcycle brand with factories in Japan, Michigan, Philippines, India, Indonesia, Bangladesh, and Thailand.

=== Headquarters history ===
Kawasaki Heavy Industries logo

Kawasaki Heavy Industries, is a Japanese company with heavy industry as its primary business. Its business scope covers aviation, space, railway vehicles, motorcycles, ships, machinery, and various equipment. Has occupies a pivotal position in motorcycle brands and is also one of the four powerful motorcycles in Japan.

== Sbarro Super Twelve ==
In 1982, Swiss specialty car manufacturer Sbarro constructed a mid-engined sports car with hatchback bodywork called the Sbarro Super Twelve. The Super Twelve had an inline twelve-cylinder engine (a nominal straight-12) which consisted of two "joined" Z1300 engines. The two engines were not a unit, as such, they were connected only by belt. Each engine kept its own gearbox and drove its own rear wheel. The car weighed 800 kg (1,764 lb) and produced 240 bhp (179 kW; 243 PS). Performance was described as "ferocious". Only one was ever built.

== Millyard Z2300 V-12 ==
In 2008, noted British engineer and motorcycle customizer Allen Millyard built a one-off 2300 cc version of the Z1300 by joining two Z1300 engines together in a V-12 configuration. Although Z1300 weight is more than 300 kg, this powerful heart takes less than 12 seconds to accelerate from 0 to 400 meters, and the top speed can reach 220 km/h. Together with the Honda CBX, Suzuki GS1000 and Yamaha XS1100 in the same period, it is described as a "superbike" for their extreme size and performance for the time.

== Maintenance and updates ==
Maintenance of the Z1300s is relatively easy. Valve clearance needs to be checked regularly, but there are only two valves per cylinder and it is rarely necessary to change the shims before 10,000 miles. The three twin-choke carburettors on early machines require regular balance checks to maintain fuel economy and performance.

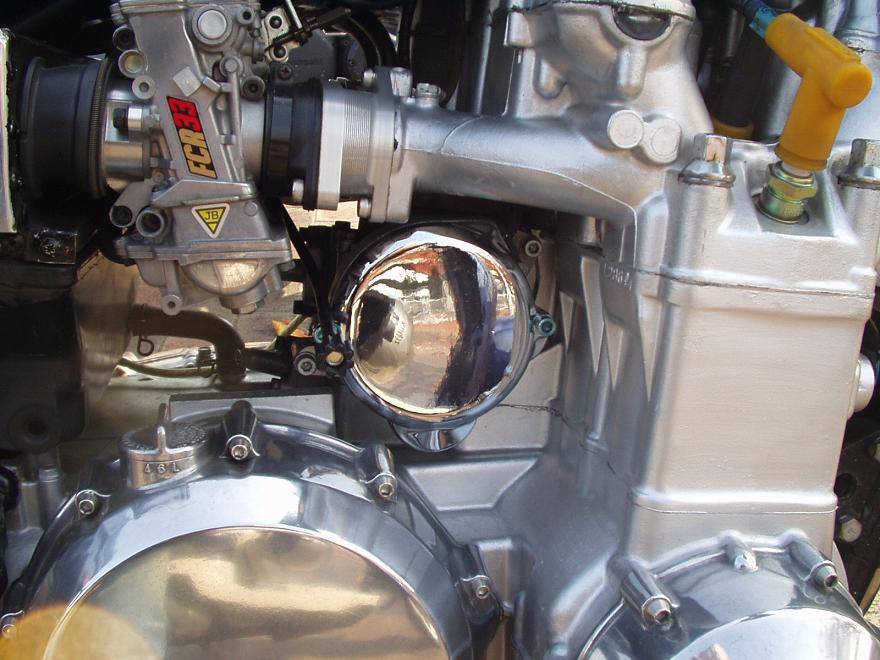
Kawasaki Z1300 fuel system

Kawasaki experienced some oil system problems on the early Z1300 (on the A2 version, in 1980, from engine number KZT30A-006201, the oil pan volume increased from 4.5 to 6 litres). In 1981, the electronic ignition system was updated.

A major update came with the 1984 model, with the addition of Digital Fuel Injection. This improved the fuel consumption and added ten horsepower for a (claimed) total of 130hp

Although its straight-six engine was smooth, the Z1300 was heavy, expensive and, even after the addition of DFI, not very fuel efficient, and it sold poorly, particularly in Europe. A retrospective review from 2014 said the handling "wallowed, weaved and bucked", and its fuel economy was 9.4 L/100 km; 25 mpg_{‑US} (30 mpg_{‑imp}).

== See also ==
- Kawasaki Z series
- Benelli Sei
- Honda CBX
