= Honda CB650SC =

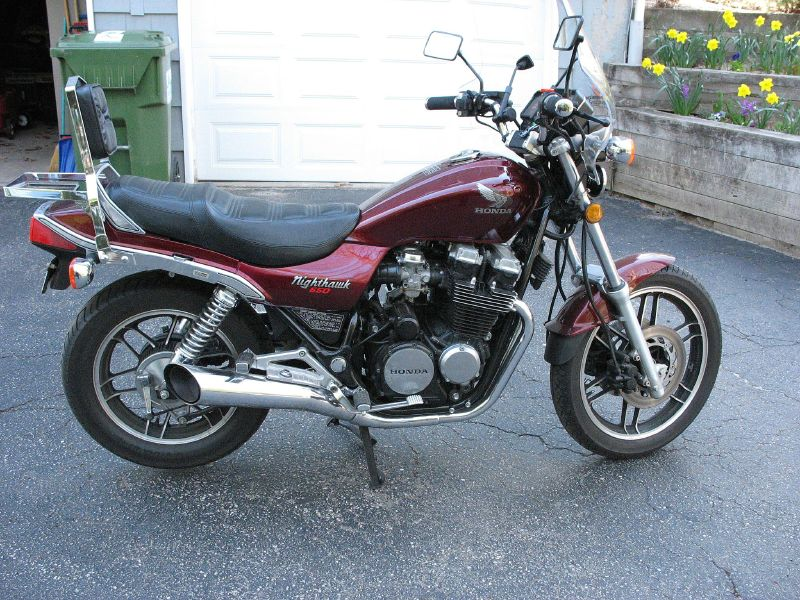
- Manufacturer: Honda
- Also called: Nighthawk 650
- Production: 1982–1985
- Class: Standard
- Engine: 1983-1985: 656 cc (40.0 cu in) DOHC, air/oil-cooled inline four
- Compression ratio: 1983-1985: 9.5:1
- Power: 1983-1985: 72 hp (54 kW) at 9,500 rpm (SAE net at the crank)
- Ignition type: Electric start
- Transmission: 6-speed overdrive, shaft drive
- Frame type: Tubular steel full cradle
- Suspension: Front: Showa air-spring, 39mm stanchion tube diameter, brake-actuated hydraulic anti-dive Rear: dual Showa shocks, 5-way adjustable spring preload, 4-way adjustable rebound damping
- Brakes: Front: Dual single-action hydraulic calipers, 10.9 in (276 mm) discs Rear: Drum, single-leading shoe, rod-operated
- Tires: Front: 100/90-19; Rear: 130/90-16
- Rake, trail: 3.86 in (98 mm)
- Wheelbase: 57.8 in (1,470 mm)
- Seat height: 30.7 in (780 mm)
- Weight: 451 lb (205 kg) (dry)
- Fuel capacity: 12.9 L (2.8 imp gal; 3.4 US gal)), (0.5 US gallon reserve)
- Fuel consumption: 29–55 mpg (US)
- Related: CB550SC; CBX650E; CB700SC

The CB650SC (also called the Nighthawk 650) is a Honda standard motorcycle sold in the US from 1982 to 1985.

In 1982, the Nighthawk replaced the Custom of the previous years and featured a re-designed tank and side covers. In 1983-1985 a new DOHC engine replaced the SOHC engine used from 1979 to 1982. The new engine had hydraulic valve lash adjusters and was rubber mounted. This year also saw the move from chain drive to shaft-drive for this model.
