= Kawasaki Z750 (1973) =

Four-cylinder motorcycle

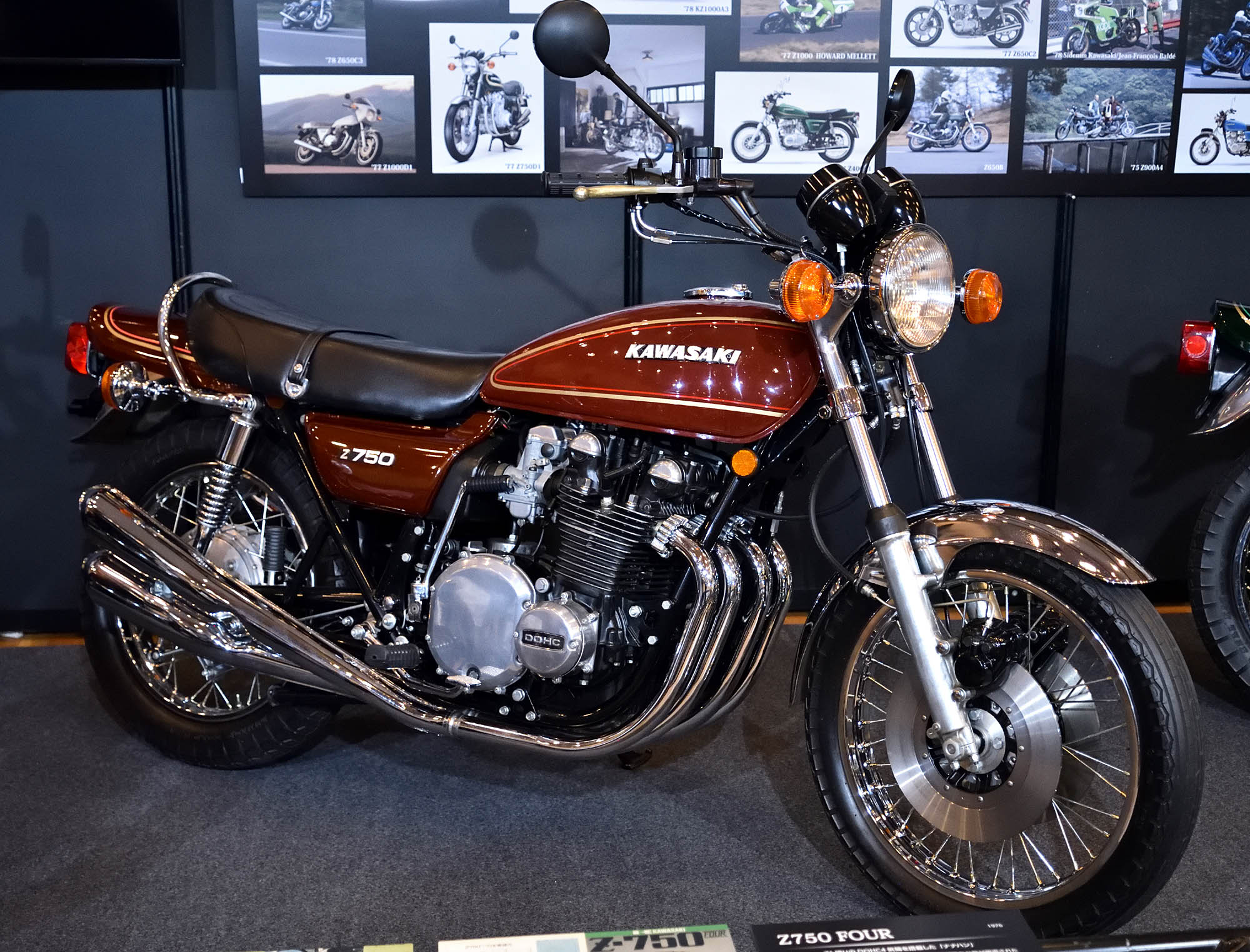
1976 Kawasaki Z750

The Kawasaki Z750, also called Z2, is a four cylinder motorcycle made by Kawasaki as part of their Z series, introduced in 1973 for the Japanese market. Regulations at the time mandated a maximum capacity of 750 cc (46 cu in), so the 900 cc (55 cu in) Kawasaki Z1 could not be sold in Japan.

Visually the Z2 is similar to the Kawasaki Z1, with the main difference being the smaller displacement. The new 746 cc engine was built with newly designed pistons and crankshaft parts to give it a feel similar to the Z1's 900 cc four cylinder engine. The engine had a maximum output of 69ps at 9,000 rpm and could propel the Z2 to a maximum speed of 170 km/h.

Production of the Z2 began in March 1973 and the bike recorded sales that were 10% higher than its nearest 750 cc competitor.

The bike was featured heavily in the anime and manga series Great Teacher Onizuka as well as its predecessor Shonan Junai Gumi, owned by characters Kyosuke Masaki and Eikichi Onizuka.

In Japan the Z2 was succeeded in 1978 by the four cylinder Kawasaki Z750FX.
