= Kawasaki Zephyr =

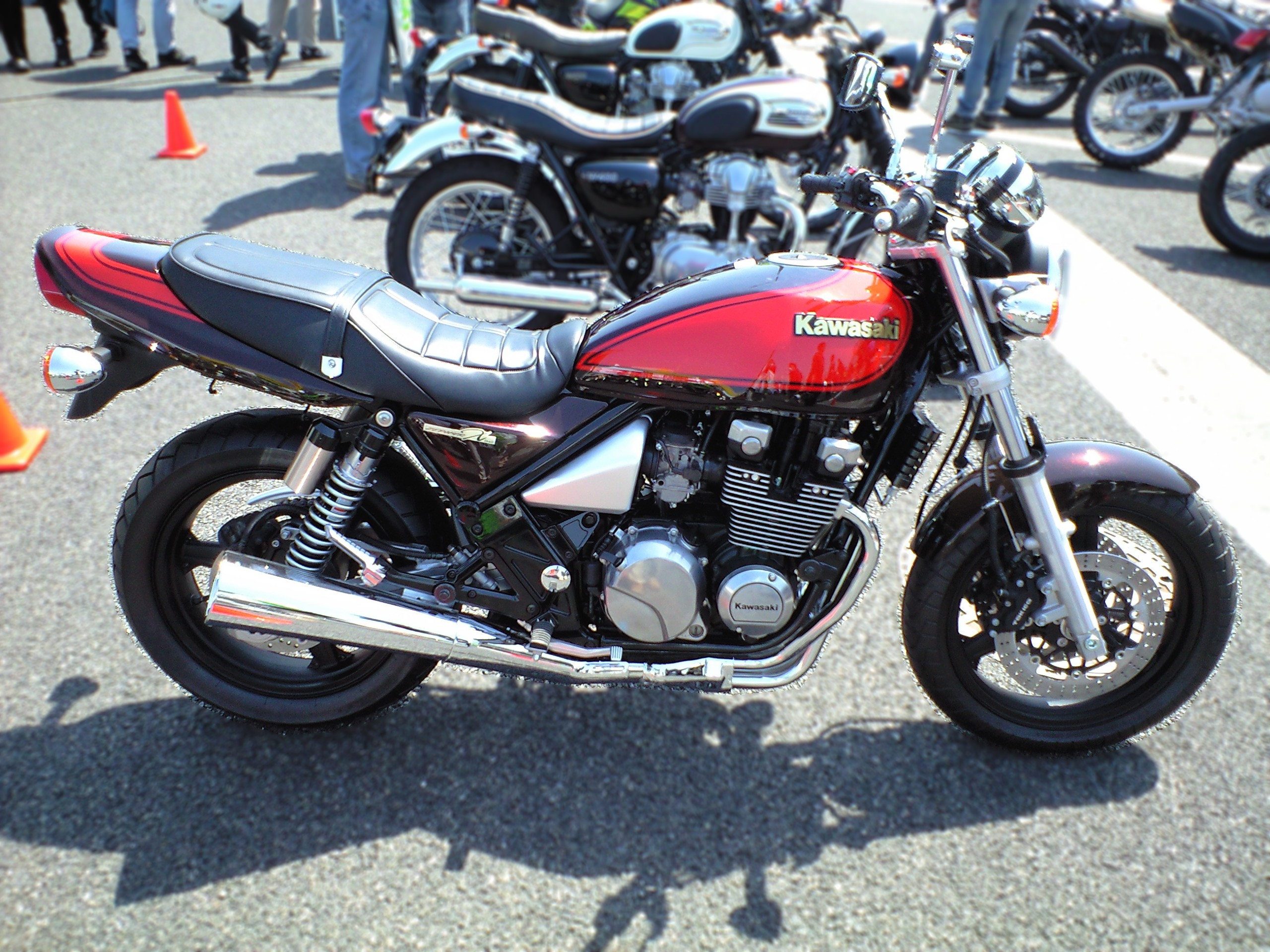
- Manufacturer: Kawasaki
- Class: Standard
- Engine: 36.8 kW (50 PS; 49 bhp)
- Transmission: 6-speed manual
- Wheelbase: 1,435 mm (56.5 in)
- Dimensions: L: 2,080 mm (81.9 in); W: 755 mm (29.7 in); H: 1,095 mm (43.1 in)
- Weight: 179 kg (395 lb) (dry)

The Kawasaki Zephyr is a range of retro-styled standard motorcycles made in the 1990s, which are derived upon Kawasaki's Z series. All models have transverse air-cooled dual overhead camshaft inline-four engines. There were a number of Zephyr models, in four engine capacities, 400, 550, 750, and 1,100 cc (24, 34, 46, and 67 cu in).

The 400 was produced for the Japan market starting in 1989. The Kawasaki Zephyr 400 is a retro-styled standard; or more appropriately a modern UJM that was produced in the 1990s as part of Kawasaki's Z series. It has a 400 cc engine and a transverse air-cooled dual overhead camshaft inline-four engine.

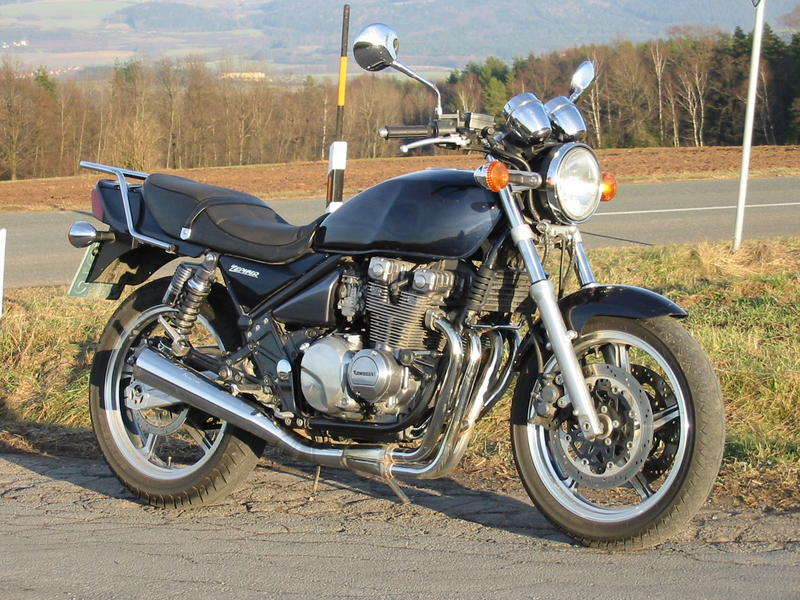
Kawasaki Zephyr ZR550

Zephyr styling is roughly based on the old Kawasaki Z1, with twin shock rear suspension, a relatively upright riding position and air-cooled power units. The 400, 550 and 750 engines were developed from the old Z400/500/550/650/750/900 series. The 1100 engine is based on the air-cooled DOHC, eight-valve inline-four that traces its roots back through the GPz1100 to the Z1000. It is the only Zephyr built with two spark plugs per cylinder.

The Zephyr pioneered the retro bike boom in the UK and Europe in the early 1990s and for a while moved Kawasaki to the 2nd best selling manufacturer of motorcycles in the UK Market.

The Zephyr Z750 engine reappeared in the late 1990s in the short lived ZR7.

The Zephyr 1100 had a Z1 restyle in its last year of sale including a return to wire wheels. Wire wheels also appeared on the 750. It was replaced in the Kawasaki UK range by the popular Z1100R styled Kawasaki ZRX1100 (1997–2005).

The Zephyr 550 was sold in the USA briefly from 1990-1991, the Zephyr 750 from 1991-1992, and the Zephyr 1100 in 1993 only. The performance-focused ZR-7 and ZRX series of muscle-standards would later succeed the Zephyr line, with the latter being modeled after Kawasaki's superbike championship winning KZ1000R-S1 that propelled Eddie Lawson to Superbike dominance in the early 1980s.
