= Kawasaki ZRX1100 =

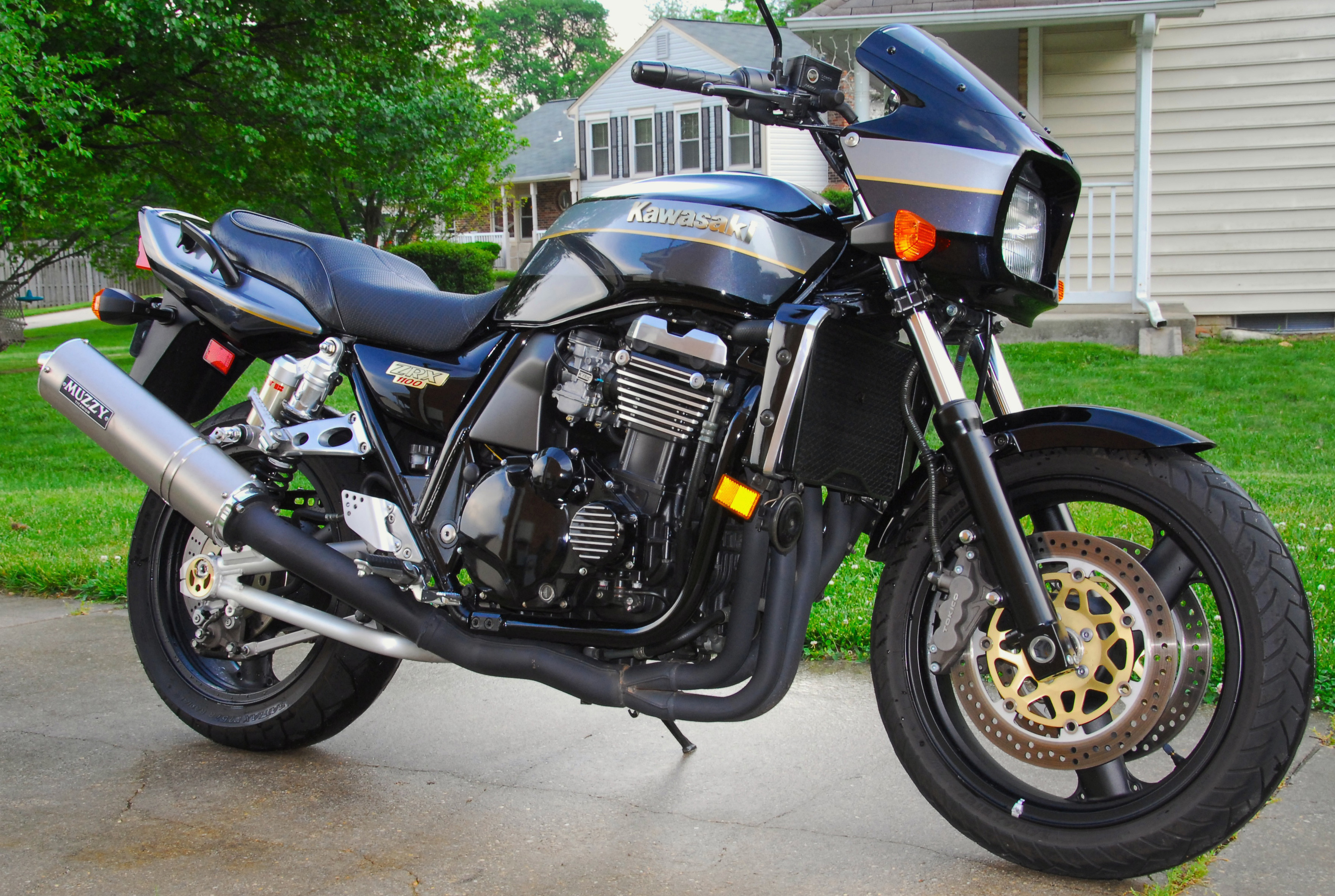
- ZRX1100R model
- Production: 1997-2000
- Successor: Kawasaki ZRX1200R
- Engine: 1,052 cc (64.2 cu in) liquid-cooled inline four 4 stroke
- Bore / stroke: 76 mm × 58 mm (3.0 in × 2.3 in)
- Top speed: 230 km/h (143 mph)
- Power: 72 kW (96 hp)(rear wheel)
- Torque: 69.3 lb⋅ft (94.0 N⋅m)(rear wheel)
- Transmission: 5 speed, chain
- Brakes: Front: 2× 310 mm discs, 6-piston calipers Rear: 250 mm disc
- Tyres: Front: 120/70-17; Rear: 170/60-17
- Wheelbase: 1,450 mm (57 in)
- Seat height: 790 mm (31 in)
- Fuel capacity: 20 L (4.4 imp gal; 5.3 US gal)

The Kawasaki ZRX1100 was a standard motorcycle made by Kawasaki from 1997 to 2000 with an engine loosely based on the ZX-11. It replaced the Zephyr 1100. Since the Zephyr 1100 sold poorly in the US, the ZRX1100 was not initially sold in that market until 1999. In 2001, the ZRX1100 was replaced by the larger engined ZRX1200, that were sold in the US until 2005. They were updated in 2008 and still sold in Japan as the ZRX1200 DAEG model until 2016. The Japanese only "Final Edition" model was sold until 2017.

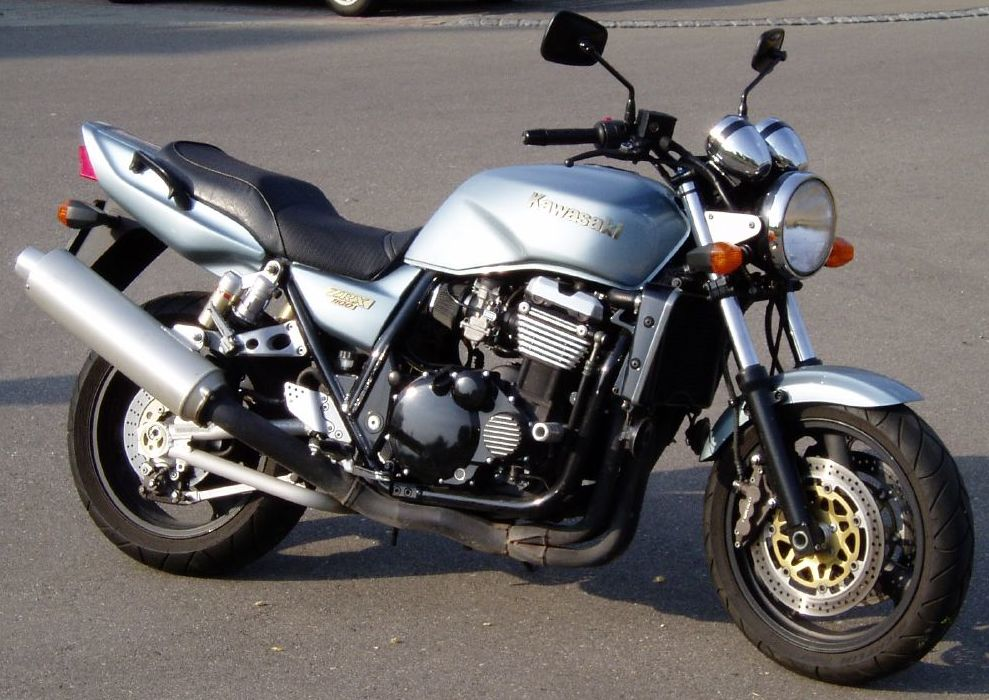
ZRX1100N model

The ZRX1100 and the later ZRX1200 were styled like 1980s muscle bikes, which were large bikes with large engines. They were also considered Universal Japanese Motorcycles. The Suzuki Bandit 1200 has been credited with leading this niche, taking a large-displacement from an early air/oil-cooled engined race replica sport bike and detuning the engine for greater low-rpm torque and easier riding, replacing the aluminum frame with steel, and leaving off the full fairings, lowering cost while losing road racing focus in favor of all-around street sport riding. One of the colour schemes replicates Eddie Lawson's 1981 and 1982 AMA Superbike Series-winning Kawasaki KZ-1000s. There were several models, such as the R which had a bikini nose fairing, with a square headlight.

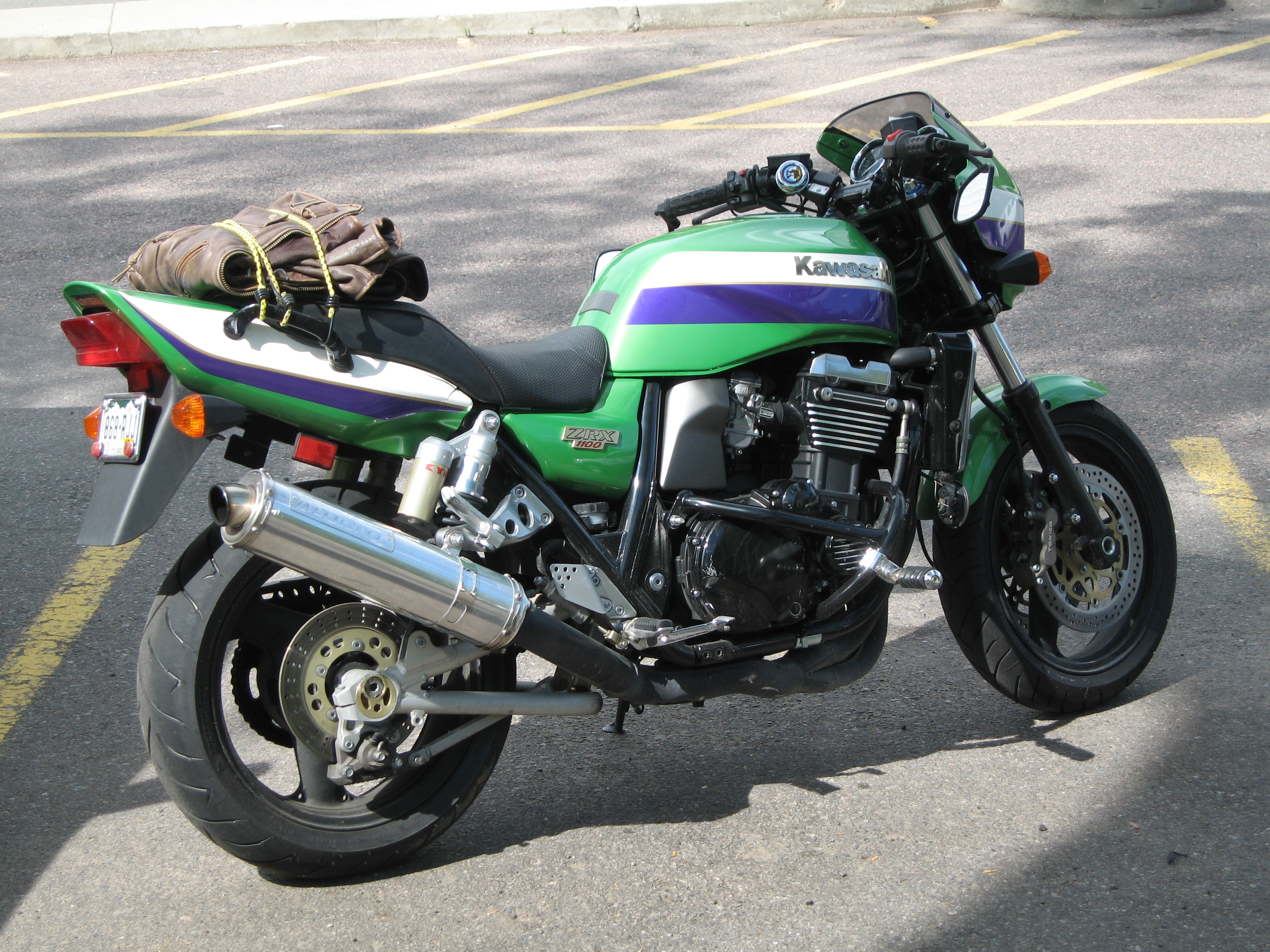
ZRX1100 in Eddie Lawson replica colours

The ZRX1100 had a top speed of 230 km/h (143 mph), and 0 to 1/4 mile (0.00 to 0.40 km) time of 11.19 seconds at 120 mph (190 km/h), and a 0 to 60 mph (0 to 97 km/h) time of 2.9 seconds.

== See also ==
- Kawasaki Z series
