= Kawasaki ZRX1200R =

Model of Kawasaki motorcycles

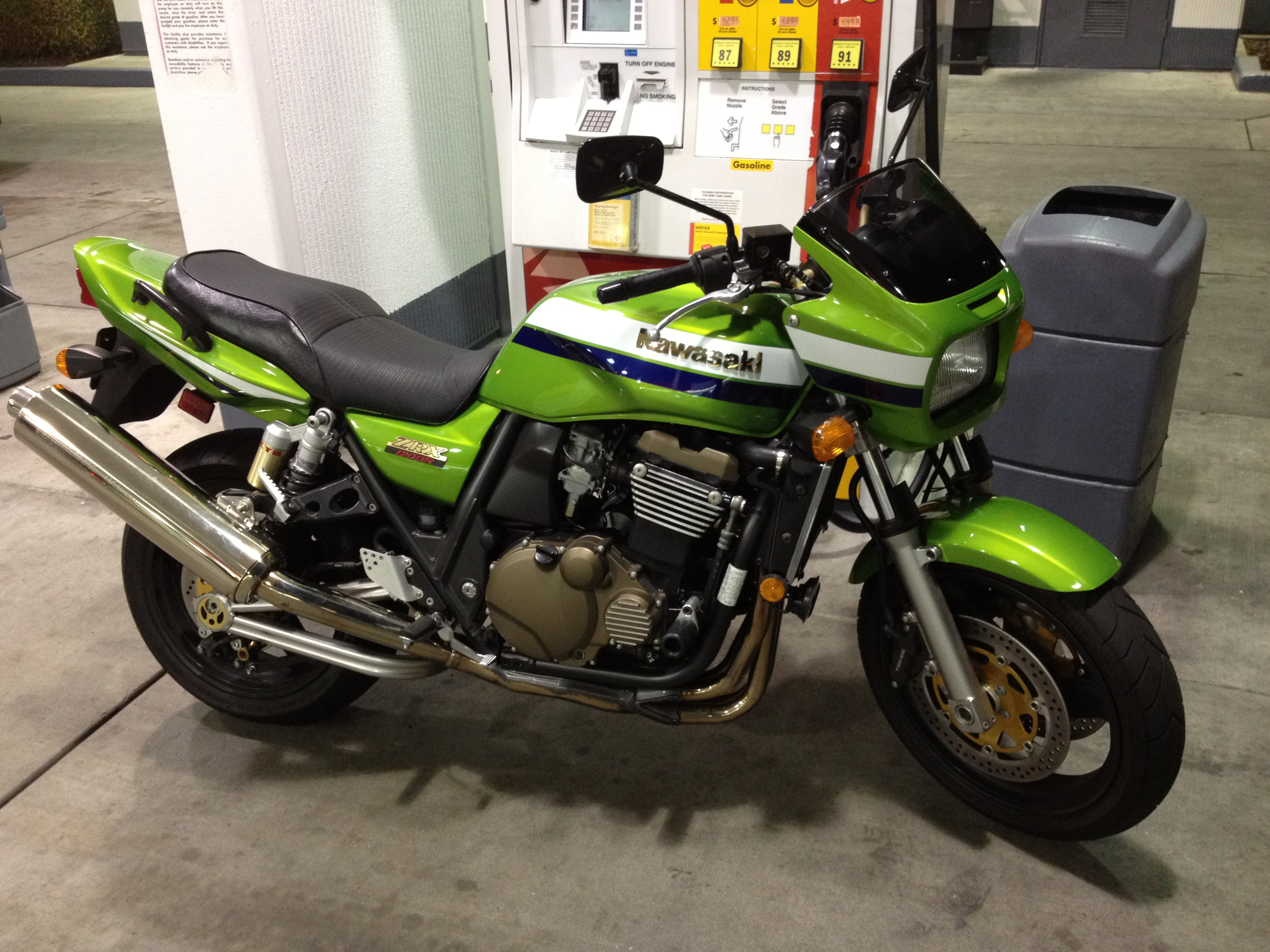
- Manufacturer: Kawasaki
- Production: 2001–2005 US; 2001–2007 Europe; 2001–2016 Japan 2017 Final Edition Japan
- Predecessor: Kawasaki ZRX1100
- Class: Standard motorcycle
- Engine: 1,164 cc (71.0 cu in) inline four
- Top speed: 147 mph (237 km/h)
- Power: 122 hp (91 kW) (claimed); 111.7 hp (83.3 kW)(rear wheel)
- Torque: 80.7 lb⋅ft (109.4 N⋅m)(rear wheel)
- Weight: 223 kg (492 lb) (dry); 247 kg (545 lb) (wet)

The Kawasaki ZRX1200R is a standard/naked motorcycle and was manufactured in Japan from 2001 until 2017.

== Overview ==
It was sold in the US until 2005 and in Europe until 2007. It was updated in 2008 with a six-speed transmission and fuel injection. It was sold exclusively in Japan as the ZRX1200 DAEG model until 2017, as the Final Edition . It is the evolution of the ZRX1100 which is a stylized version of the "Eddie Lawson Replica" KZ1000R sold in 1982. With the ZRX1200R, Kawasaki's goal was to produce a motorcycle with the performance of a modern motorcycle, while retaining a design similar to the original Eddie Lawson Replica.

Worldwide, the ZRX1200 was available in three styles: the ZRX1200S, which was partially faired; the ZRX1200R, which had a bikini fairing; and the ZRX1200C, that had no fairing. Unlike sport bikes the handle bars made of tubular aluminium are utilized. The saddle contains more than one centimetre of padding between the seat covering and the pan "for comfort." Foot pegs are positioned similarly to standard motorcycles, creating a seating position reminiscent of the classic Universal Japanese Motorcycle (UJM).

The frame is a conventional steel tube with the engine supported in a removable cradle. The suspension configuration is similar to that found on a UJM. The rear shocks, designed with a piggyback reservoir, are adjustable for preload and damping. The front suspension consists of conventional forks with adjustable damping and preload. The reinforced swing arm was designed to mimic the modified/aftermarket swingarms produced in the 1970s.

The bike features a liquid-cooled 1164cc inline 4-cylinder engine. Induction comes through four 36mm Keihin Constant Velocity carburettors. The exhaust system is a 4-into-1 stainless steel unit. The exhaust system on models produced up to 2004 are painted black, with the exception of the muffler, models produced from 2004-onwards are equipped with polished exhaust systems. The "Final Edition" model has special "Final Edition" decals, plus optional factory paint along with optional accessories such as a steering damper and motorcycle lock. It was available until 2017.

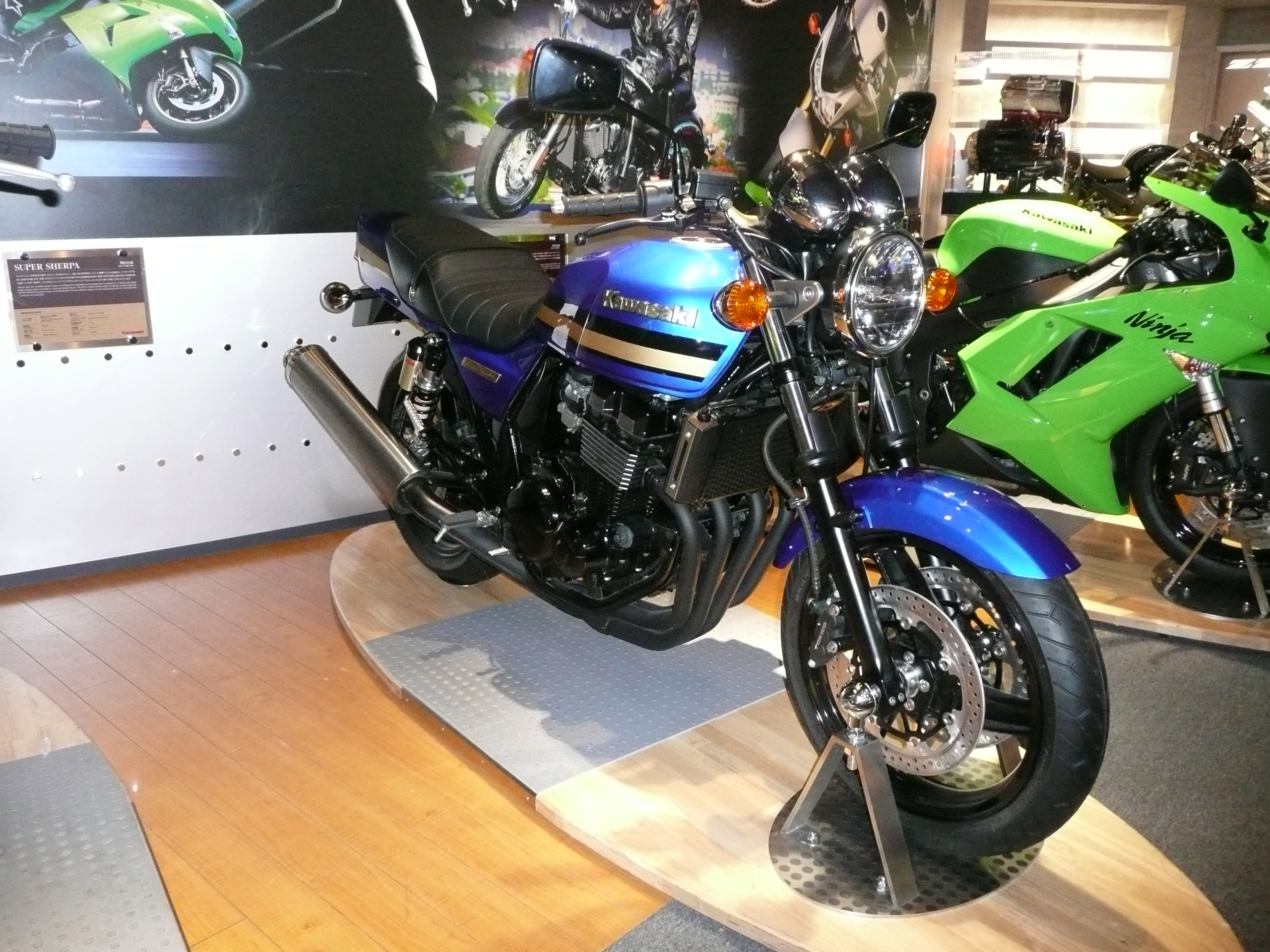
Kawasaki ZRX1200

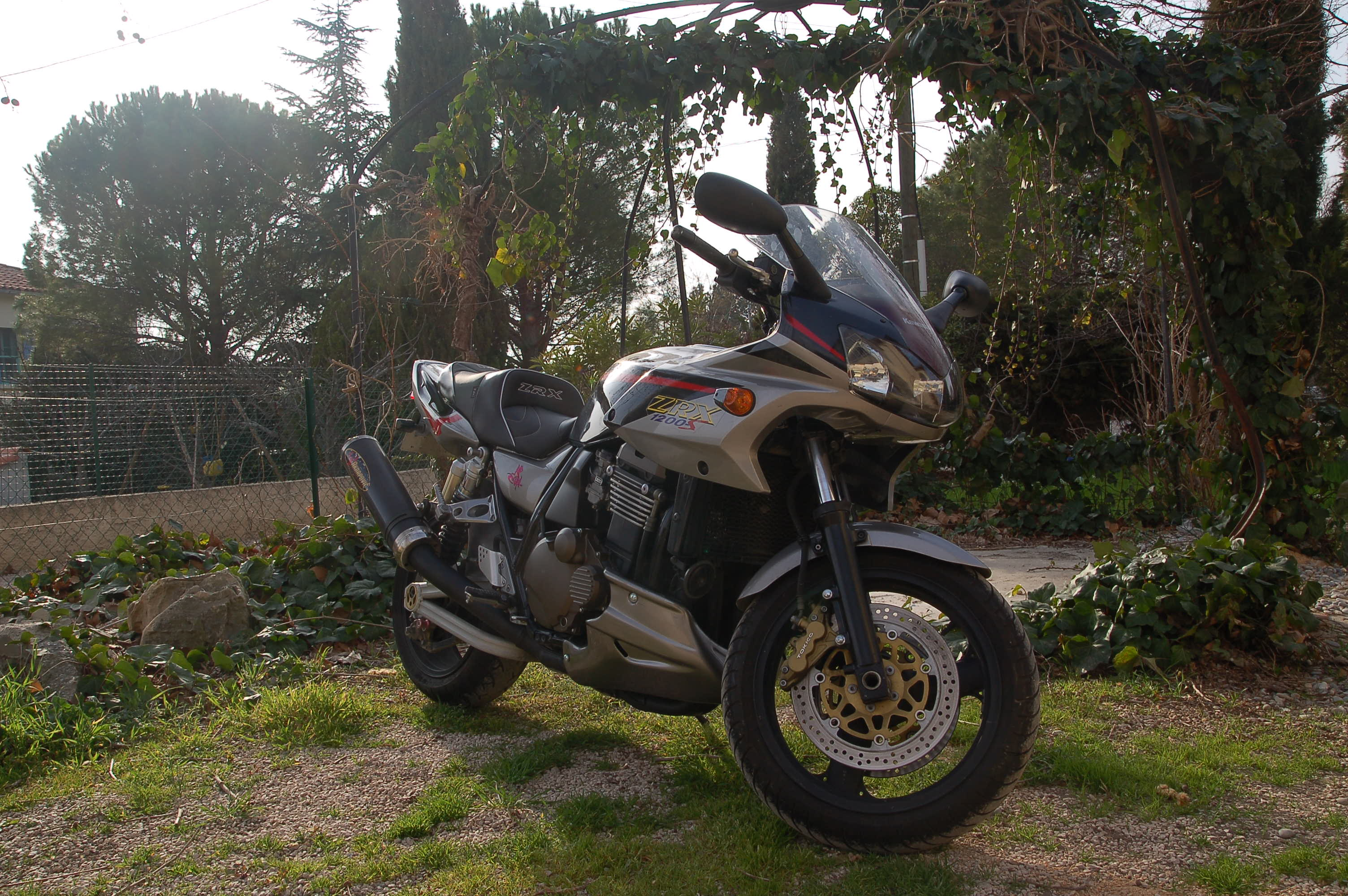
ZRX1200S

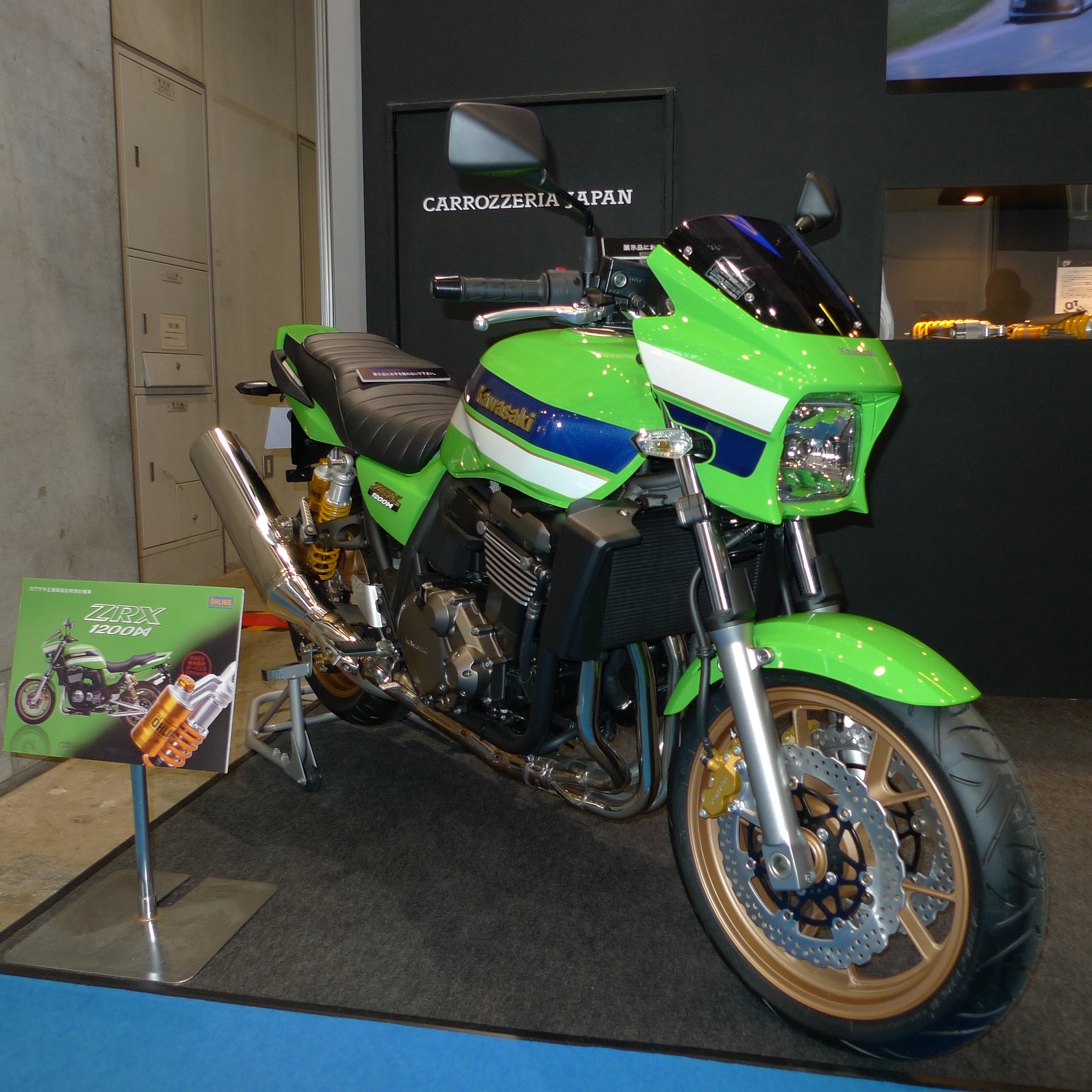
2011 Kawasaki ZRX1200 DAEG

== Specifications ==
Engine
Configuration	in-line four-cylinder four-stroke
Displacement (cc)	1,164 cc (71.0 cu in)
Bore x Stroke	79 mm × 59.4 mm (3.11 in × 2.34 in)
Compression Ratio	10.1:1
Cooling	Water Cooled
Valve train	Four valves per cylinder (DOHC)
Fuel delivery	4 36mm Keihin Constant Velocity carburetors
Power	122 hp (91 kW) (claimed)
Torque	80.7 lb⋅ft (109.4 N⋅m) (rear wheel)
Transmission
Type	5 Speed, constant mesh
Final Drive	Chain
Chassis/Suspension/Brakes
Front Suspension	Conventional 43mm Showa forks, adjustable for preload and damping, 4.9 in (120 mm)
Rear Suspension	Twin remote reservoir KYB shock absorbers, adjustable for preload and damping, 4.6 in (120 mm)
Front Brakes	Dual 310 mm discs with 6-piston calipers
Rear Brakes	Single 250 mm disc with 2-piston caliper
Front Tire	120/70-ZR17
Rear Tire	180/55-ZR17
Dimensions
Length	83.5 in (2,120 mm)
Width	30.7 in (780 mm)
Height	45.3 in (1,150 mm)
Ground clearance	5.3 in (130 mm)
Wheelbase	57.6 in (1,460 mm)
Rake	25 deg
Trail	4.1 in (100 mm)
Seat Height	31 in (790 mm)
Fuel Capacity	5.3 US gal (20 L; 4.4 imp gal)
Dry Weight	489 lb (222 kg)

== See also ==
- Kawasaki Z series
