= Kawasaki Z250C =

Motorcycle produced by Kawasaki Heavy Industries

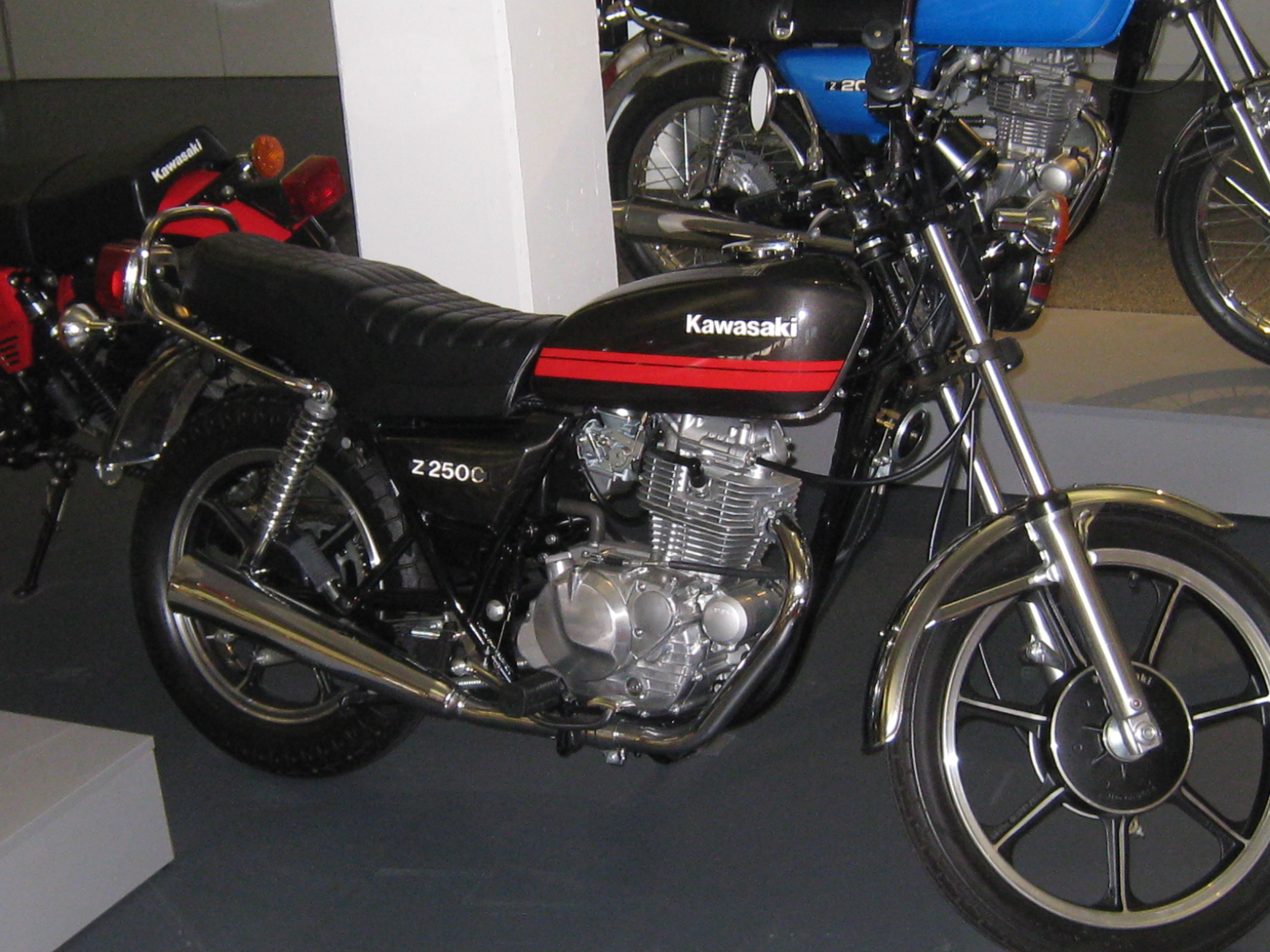
Kawasaki Z250C

Kawasaki Z250C is a motorcycle model that was produced by the Japanese manufacturer Kawasaki Heavy Industries.

== History ==
The Z250C was launched in 1980, a year after the Kawasaki Z250A. The original price was 3620 DM in 1981. It was the cheapest from the Kawasaki Z250 series and was built until 1982.

== Equipment ==
The engine is a single cylinder with a displacement of 246 cm^{3}, overhead camshaft and electric starter. It was throttled to 17PS for the insurance-favorable class. The maximum torque is 19Nm, which can be reached at 4000 / min. The final drive worked via a chain. The front and rear drum brakes were integrated into the cast wheels. The machine reached a top speed of 126 km / h and weighed 132 kg when fully fueled. The 9.3 liter steel tank made it possible to travel on motorbikes.

== Similar models ==
Similar models were the Z250 A, which was first built in 1979, and the Z250LTD, which was built in 1980, and which is one of the softchoppers.
