= Honda CB550 =

CB550
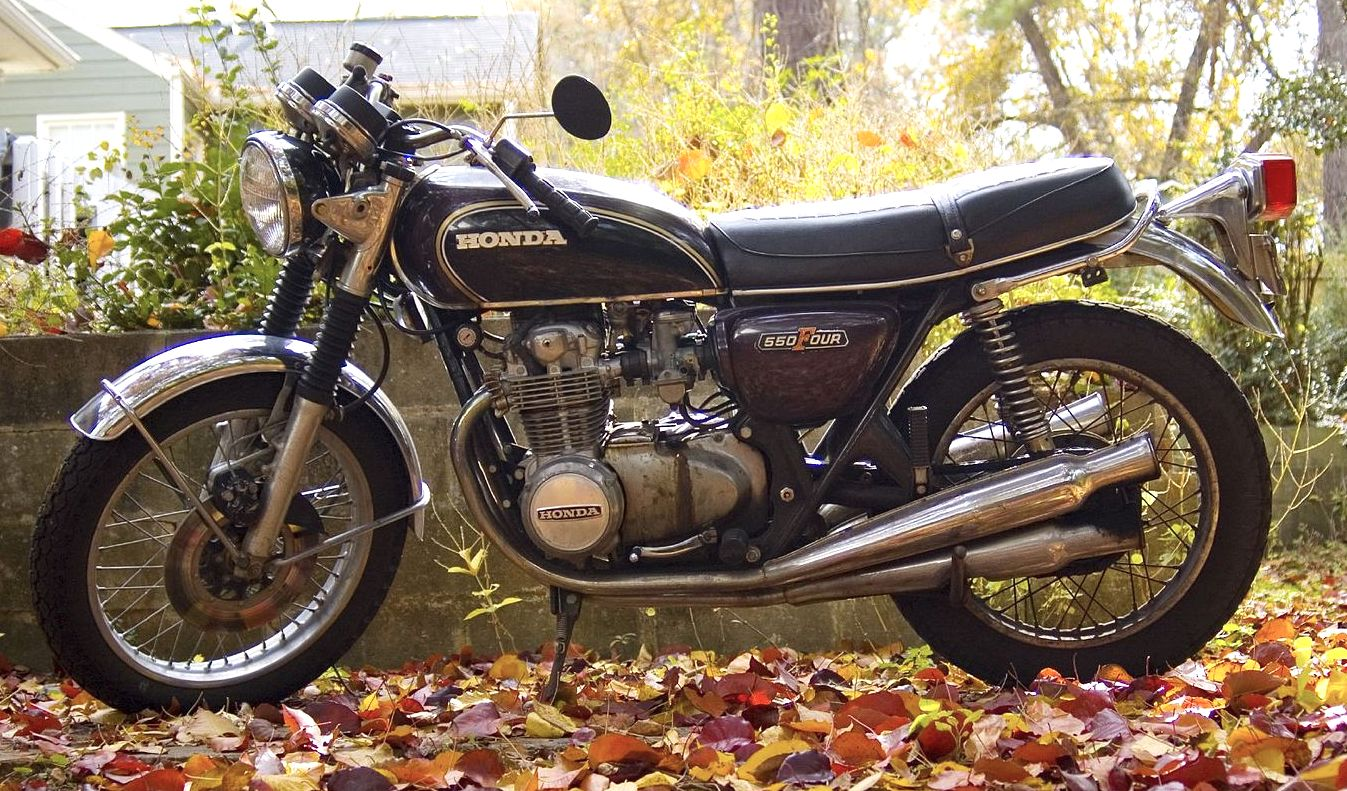
- Honda CB550K
- Manufacturer: Honda
- Production: 1974–1978
- Predecessor: Honda CB500
- Successor: Honda CB650
- Class: standard motorcycle
- Engine: 544 cc (33.2 cu in) air-cooled 8-valve SOHC transverse four
- Bore / stroke: 58.5 mm × 50.6 mm (2.30 in × 1.99 in)
- Compression ratio: 9.0:1
- Top speed: 109 mph (175 km/h)
- Power: 50 bhp (37 kW) @ 8,500 rpm
- Torque: 26.04 lbf⋅ft (35.31 N⋅m) 7,000 rpm
- Ignition type: battery and ignition coil
- Transmission: 5-speed manual, chain final drive
- Suspension: Front: 35 mm telescopic forks Rear: Twin shocks with adjustable pre-load
- Brakes: single single-caliper front disc, rear drum
- Tires: Front: 3.25 x 19 in Rear: 3.75 x 18 in
- Rake, trail: Rake: 64°, trail: 105 mm
- Seat height: 805 mm (31.7 in)
- Weight: 198 kg (437 lb) (dry); 455 lb (206 kg) (wet)
- Fuel capacity: 14 L (3.1 imp gal; 3.7 US gal)
- Fuel consumption: 5.9 L/100 km; 48 mpg_{‑imp} (40 mpg_{‑US})

The Honda CB550 is a 544 cc (33.2 cu in) standard motorcycle made by Honda from 1974 to 1978. It has a four-cylinder SOHC air-cooled wet sump engine. The first version, the CB550K, was a development of the earlier CB500, and like its predecessor, had four exhaust pipes, four silencers and wire-spoked wheels.

== Model development ==
Compared to Honda's 1969 dry sump CB750, both the CB500 and the CB550 were much smaller and lighter. The CB550K shared some visual similarities with the CB750, and it fit into Honda's four-cylinder range as its mid-capacity bike.

From 1975 to 1977, a second version of the CB550 was offered, the CB550F "Super Sport". The CB550K and CB550F were sold alongside each other, sharing a similar engine, instruments, lights, wheels, brakes, and frame. The CB550F has a lighter four-into-one exhaust, slightly flatter handlebars, and a different fuel tank without chrome trim. The CB550F is part of the Honda Super Sport range, along with the CB400F, an CB750F. The F (aka F1) was succeeded by the F2, which had an additional flash decal on the fuel tank and deletion of the fork gaiters.

Both CB550F and CB550K models had a drum rear brake and a single front disc brake, although each fork slider had a bracket for a brake caliper. The CB550K went through some minor iterations, the last being the CB550K4. Closely derived from the earlier CB500, the CB550's engine was the largest factory boring of this cylinder block; and when the CB550 was replaced in 1979 by the broadly similar Honda CB650, a completely new engine design was necessary.

Cycle Test magazine recorded a 0 to 1/4 mi (0.00 to 0.40 km) time of 14.47 seconds at 93.36 mph (150.25 km/h) in a September 1975 test of the CB550F Super Sport. The engine output was 50 bhp (37 kW) at 8,000 rpm and 26.04 lbf⋅ft (35.31 N⋅m) torque at 7,500 rpm, with a curb weight of 455 lb (206 kg) and average fuel consumption of 5.9 L/100 km; 48 mpg_{‑imp} (40 mpg_{‑US}).

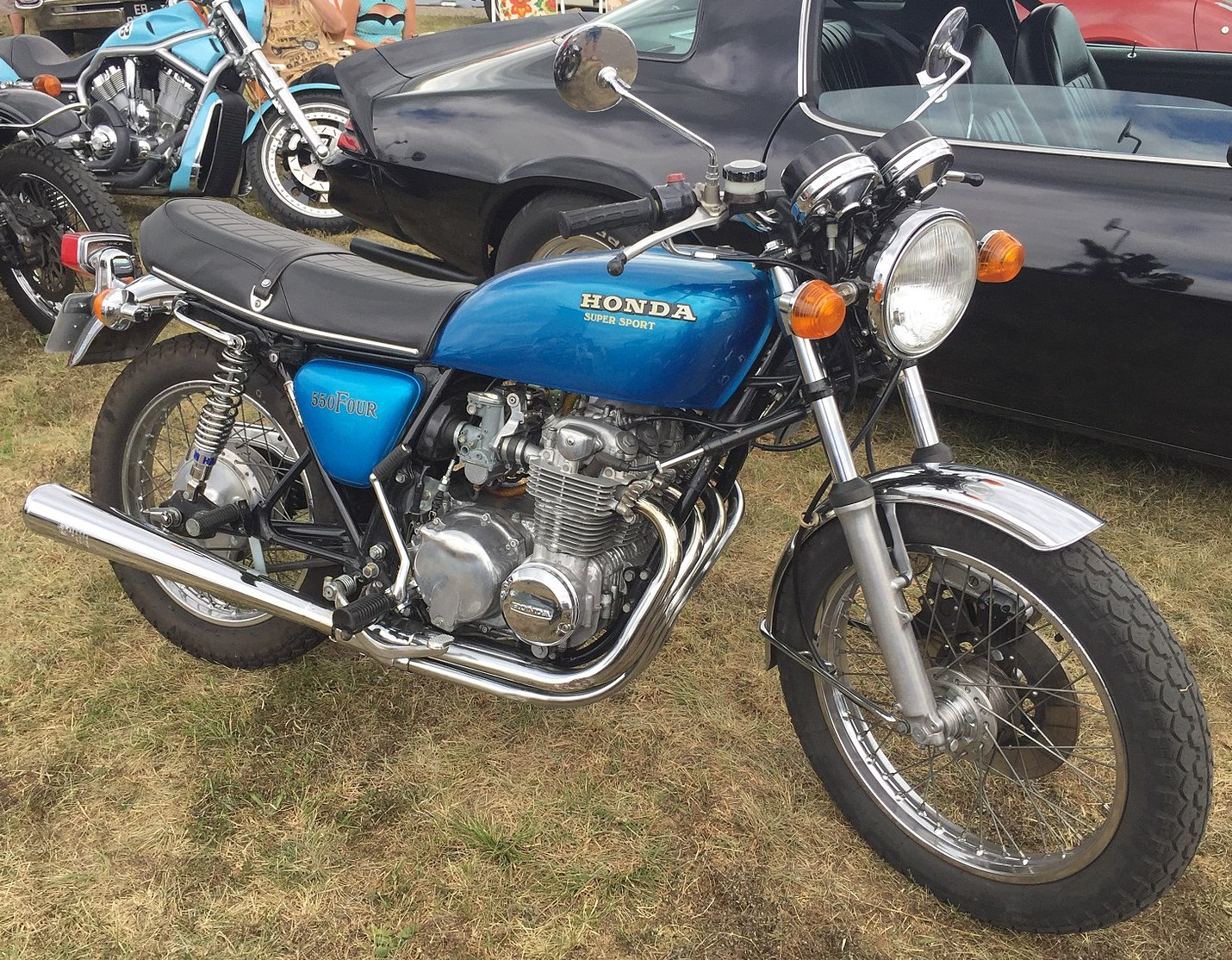
1976 Honda CB550F1 SuperSport

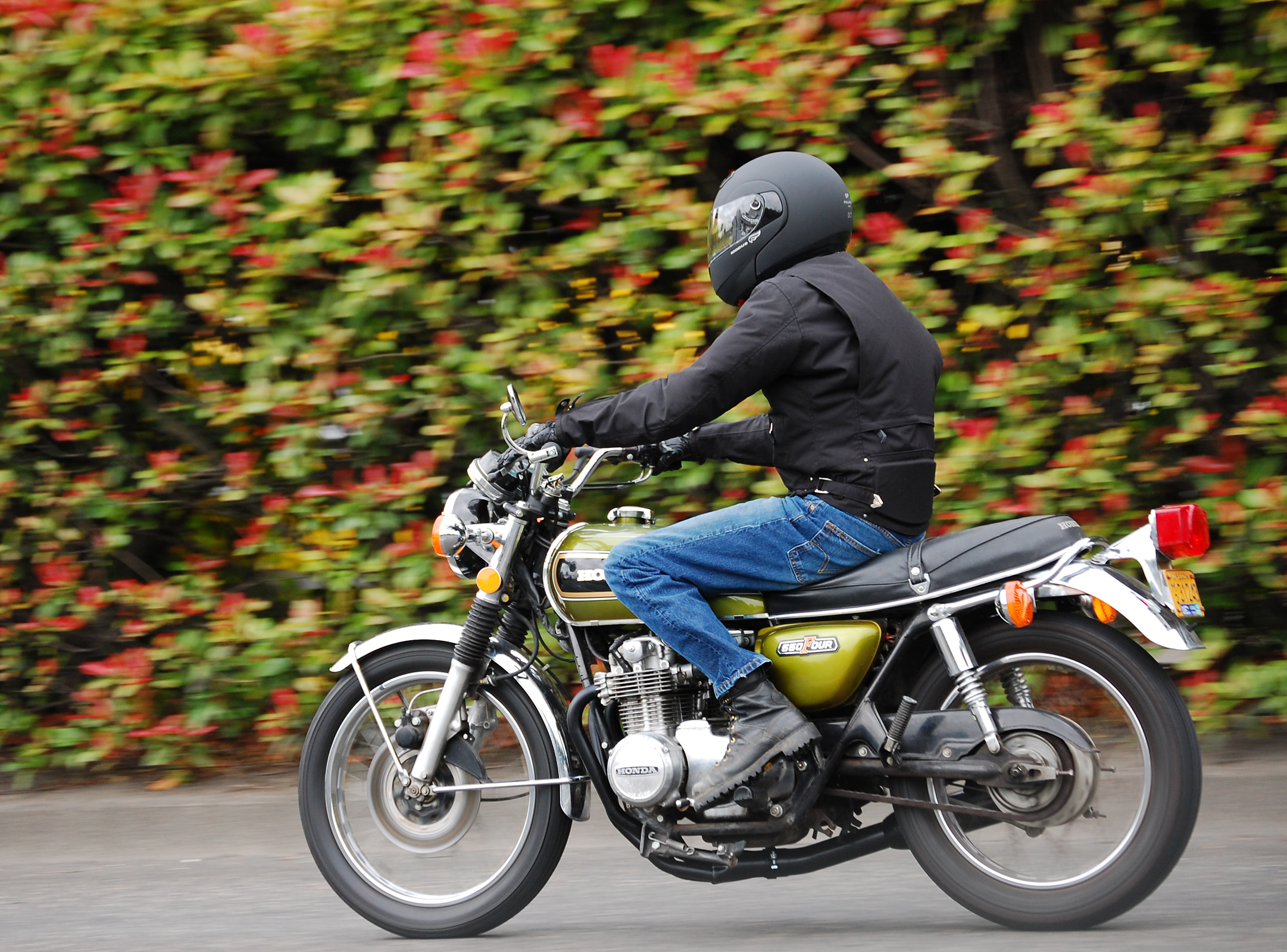
CB550K (4-into-1) on the road
