= Kawasaki KZ400 =

Street motorcycle that was produced by Kawasaki between 1974 and 1984

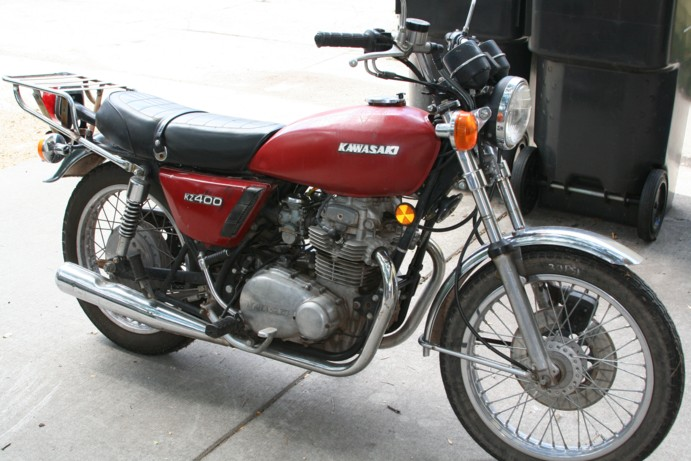
KZ400

The Kawasaki KZ400/Z400 is a street motorcycle that was produced by Kawasaki between 1974 and 1984. The 398cc displacement of the twin cylinder engine was increased to 443cc for the KZ440/Z440. The later KZ400-J used a 399cc four cylinder engine.

== Twins ==
The original Kawasaki KZ400 was a 398 cc twin cylinder motorcycle produced from 1974 to 1984. The engine had twin balancer shafts to reduce vibration, one in front of the crankshaft and one to the rear, both moving in the opposite direction to the rotating crankshaft. An emission control system recycled "blow-by" gases. The manufacturers advertised it as a "most practical all-round machine".

Later models displaced 443 cc. The KZ400 was built at plants in Akashi, Japan and Lincoln, Nebraska. The Lincoln plant (built in 1974) made Kawasaki the first foreign motorcycle manufacturer to operate a plant in the United States. The KZ400 outsold Honda in the 400 cc twins market through the 1970s. These motorcycles were marketed as fuel efficient transportation; a 1975 magazine advertisement for Kawasaki featured the KZ400 next to a Volkswagen Beetle with the tag line "Think even smaller."

Early models were prone to oil leaks and unstable idling. Both the carburetors and the design of the oil passages were redesigned beginning in 1977. Some models were offered as bare-bones transportation, with no electric start and front drum brakes. Most, however, had a single disc in the front and drum in the rear as well as electric and kick starters. Deluxe models also had a fairing and saddle bags.

=== Model History ===
	400 Twin		
1974	KZ400D		
1975	KZ400D	KZ400S	
1976	kZ400-D3	KZ400-S2	
1977	kZ400-D4	KZ400-A1	KZ400-S3
1978	kZ400-B1	KZ400-A2	KZ400-C1
1979	kZ400-B2	Z400-G1	KZ400-H1 LTD
1980	kZ400-B3	Z400-G2	KZ400-H2 LTD

== Fours ==
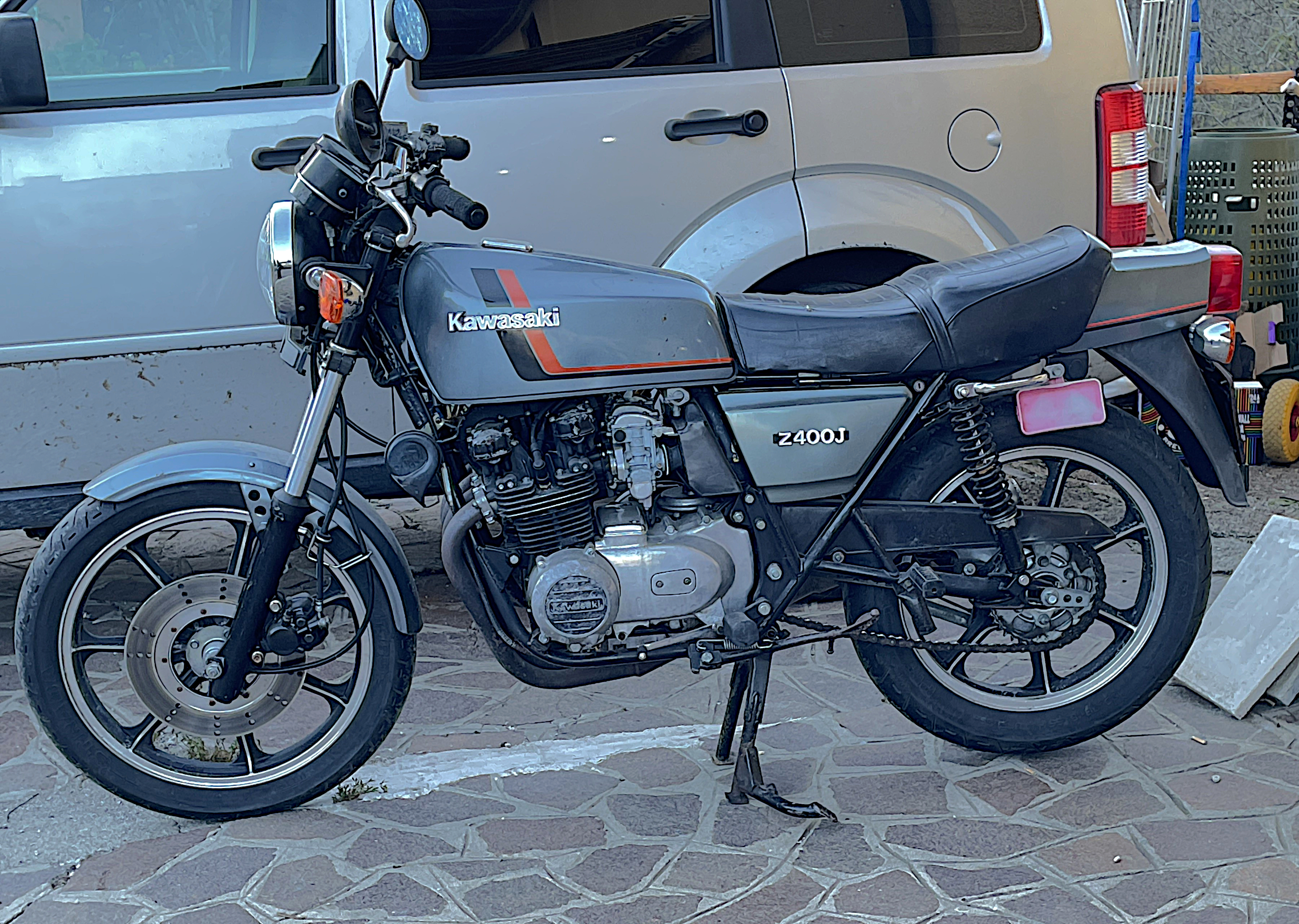
Kawasaki Z400-J

The Kawasaki KZ400-J had an air-cooled four-cylinder, four-stroke, eight-valve DOHC engine, and six-speed gearbox derived from the larger Kawasaki Z500/Z550. The KZ400J was produced from 1980 to 1983. The "West Germany" version was limited to 20 kW. These bikes were electric start only, and the KZ400-J had a single (US model) or double (UK, Western Germany models) disc brake at the front, and a drum brake rear.

The 1980 model was identified as Kawasaki KZ400-J1, while in 1981 the Kawasaki KZ400-J2 was introduced with small differences, like a transistorised ignition system.

Introduced in the UK in 1980 as the J1 version, their styling and spec was aimed at the sports touring market and as a competition against the Honda CB400/4 and CB550/4 series of successful UJM (universal Japanese motorcycle) middleweights. The 400 was almost the same in specs as the Z500 model but differed in that it had a rear drum brake instead of a disc. The J2 was fitted with air assisted forks, adjustable damping rear twin shocks, tubeless tyres in cast 7 spoke wheels, grab rail and different tank/seat cowl striping. The J3 version was offered was Megaphone shortie silencers and chromed tops on the twin shocks. In 1983 the Z400 was altered significantly and the engine was heavily reworked resulting in the ZR400.

=== Engine datasheet ===
	KZ400-J
Bore and Stroke	52.0 x 47.0 mm
Displacement	399 cc
Compression ratio	9.5
Engine oil	3.0L of SE class SAE 10W40, 10W50, 20W40 or 20W50
Cyl. numbering	LTR 1–2
Ignition pattern	1-2-4-3
Spark plugs	NGK D8EA or ND X24ES-U

=== Transmission data ===
	KZ400-J
1st gear	2.57 (36/14)
2nd gear	1.78 (32/18)
3rd gear	1.38 (29/21)
4th gear	1.13 (27/24)
5th gear	0.96 (25/26)
6th gear	0.85 (23/27)
Primary red. ratio	3.28 (27/23*67/24)
Final red. ratio	2.50 (40/16)
Overall drive ratio	6.98 (Top Gear)

== See also ==
- Kawasaki Z series
