= Honda CB500 Four =

1970s Japanese medium sized motorcycle

CB500
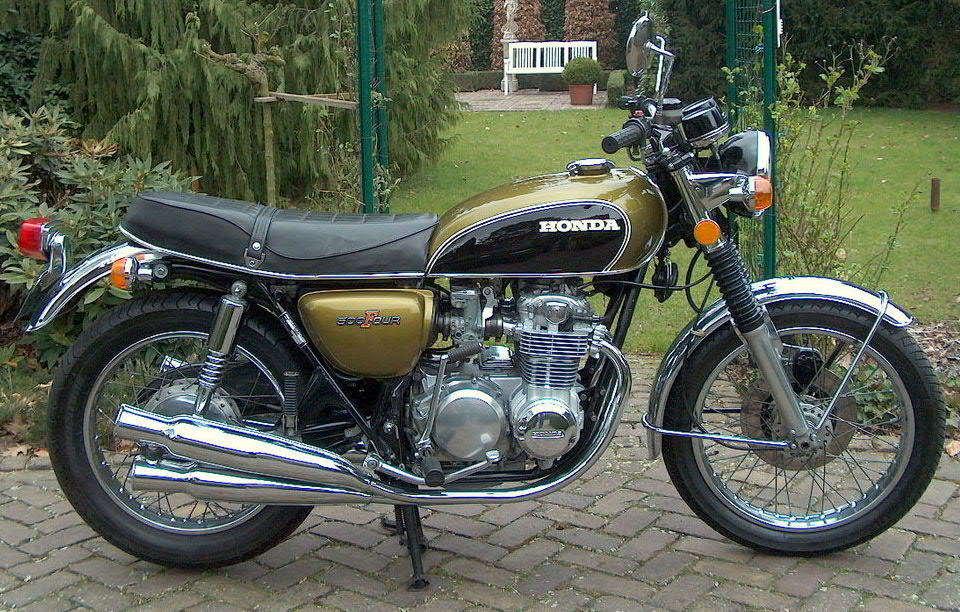
- Manufacturer: Honda
- Also called: Honda CB500 Four K model
- Production: 1971–1978; 1971–1973 (US)
- Successor: Honda CB550
- Class: Standard
- Engine: 498 cc (30.4 cu in), air-cooled, 8-valve, SOHC, transverse inline-four
- Bore / stroke: 56 mm × 50.6 mm (2.20 in × 1.99 in)
- Compression ratio: 9:1
- Top speed: 100 mph (160 km/h)
- Power: 47 hp (35 kW) (Kraftfahrtbundesamt)
- Ignition type: Electric start
- Transmission: 5-speed manual, chain final drive
- Suspension: Front: 35 mm telescopic forks Rear: Twin shocks with adjustable pre-load
- Brakes: Single front 267 mm disc, rear drum
- Tyres: Front: 3.25×19"; Rear: 3.50×18"
- Rake, trail: 64°, 105 mm
- Weight: 185 kg (408 lb) (dry)
- Fuel capacity: 14 L (3.1 imp gal; 3.7 US gal)

The Honda CB500 Four is a standard 498 cc (30.4 cu in), air-cooled, 8-valve, SOHC, transverse inline-four motorcycle made by Honda from 1971 to 1978. It was introduced at the London Racing and Sporting Motorcycle Show in February 1972, and sold in the US market until 1973, replaced by the CB550 in the 1974 model year, while continuing in the European market until 1978. The CB500 Four is styled like the CB750, but smaller and lighter, with a claimed 50 bhp (37 kW) output and a top speed of 115 mph (185 km/h).

Like the earlier CB750, it has a single front hydraulic disc brake, rear drum brake, electric starter, and SOHC eight-valve engine. The four-into-four exhaust pipes echoed those of the CB750. Unlike the earlier dry sump CB750, the smaller bike has a wet sump engine. Also, the primary drives were different, the CB750 having a duplex chain, while the CB500 had a "Hy-Vo" Morse chain.

Reviewing the 1972 show models, UK monthly magazine Motorcycle Mechanics described the CB500 as "one of the 'show stealers'. Four cylinders, in-line across the frame, four carburettors and single overhead camshaft motor, coupled to a five-speed gearbox give this 500 cc machine the performance of a 650 twin cylinder bike."

Several CB500 machines were entered in the Production TT races on the Isle of Man in the early 1970s. Bill Smith won the 1973 500 cc TT Production race (four laps) riding one, 8.2 seconds ahead of second place Stan Woods mounted on a Suzuki T500 two-stroke, twin.
