= Honda CB550SC =

The Honda Nighthawk CB550SC is a four-cylinder motorcycle manufactured by Honda in Japan and sold in the United States in 1983; it was sold in Canada for 2 years in both 1983 and 1984. It had a six-speed manual transmission (sixth was 'overdrive'), shaft drive, single front disc and rear drum brakes, side and center stands, and seating for two, with a "grab bar" mounted at the rear of the passenger seat.

The 550sc was the first 550 Honda offered with a dual overhead cam. It actually used the same camshaft as the slightly larger CB650 nighthawk. The engine was very low maintenance with hydraulic self-adjusting valves.

The power was rated @ 75 horsepower and roughly 36 foot pounds of torque. Fuel economy was 41 MPG on average. It would cover a quarter mile in 12.67 seconds @ @102 MPH. Though there have been various claims about the horsepower in magazines the Honda specifications in their Official American Honda Service Manual rates the HP at 64 at 9500 rpm with a torque of 36.5 lb.-ft. at 8000 rpm.
