= Kawasaki KZ200 =

Motorcycle model by Kawasaki

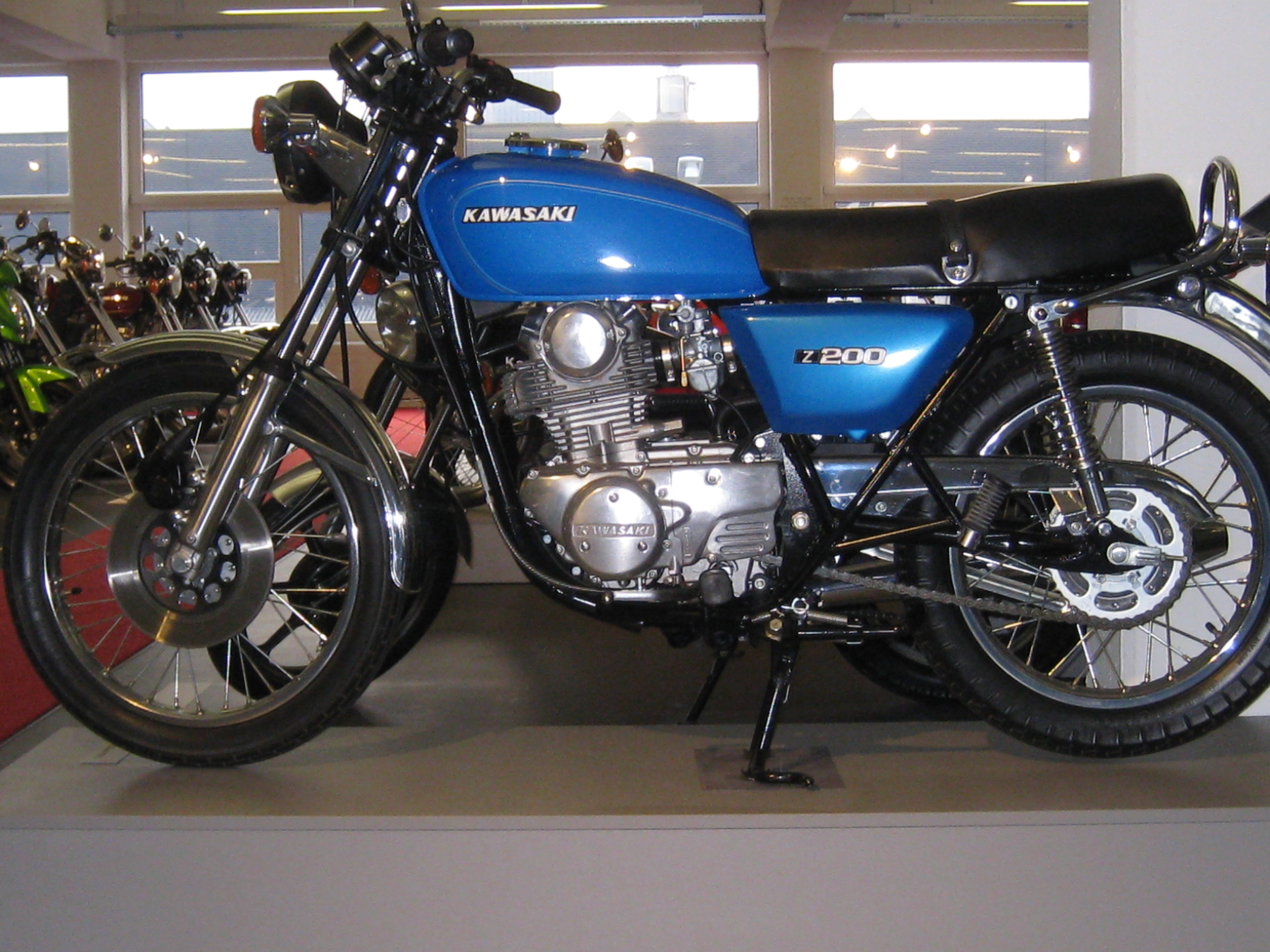
Kawasaki KZ200

The Kawasaki KZ200 or Z200 was a street motorcycle produced between 1977 and 1984 by Kawasaki.

With 198 cc (12.1 cu in) single-cylinder engine, it was considered one of the biggest engine capacities of mass-production motorcycle in Indonesia in the early 1980s.

== Development history ==
The production began in 1977, starting with conventional points type ignition system. This configuration lasted until the latest production batch in 1982.

By 1983, the motorcycle adopted the Capacitor Discharge Ignition (CDI) system until the production stopped in 1984. The early production of this specification is called Merzy CDI, while the latter were launched with new model of fuel tank and referred as Merzy Cobra.

It was once planned that Kawasaki Motorcycles would launch a new model with improved engine capacity of 250 cc. However, due to the Indonesia's governmental regulation at that time, the plan was turned down. The regulation limited the engine capacity of maximum 200 cc for public motorcycles during the period.

== Specifications ==
- 198 cc (12.1 cu in) displacement
- 5-speed transmission
- Front disc brake, rear drum brake

== See also ==
- Kawasaki KZ400

== Additional information ==
- The early KZ200 had a cable-operated front disc brake, which was uncommon for a motorcycle sold in the US.
- The later engines from the KZ250 and LTD250 will bolt right in for a small displacement increase with more power.
- The KZ200 was only sold in the US for two years, 1978 and 1979.
