= Kawasaki KLE500 =

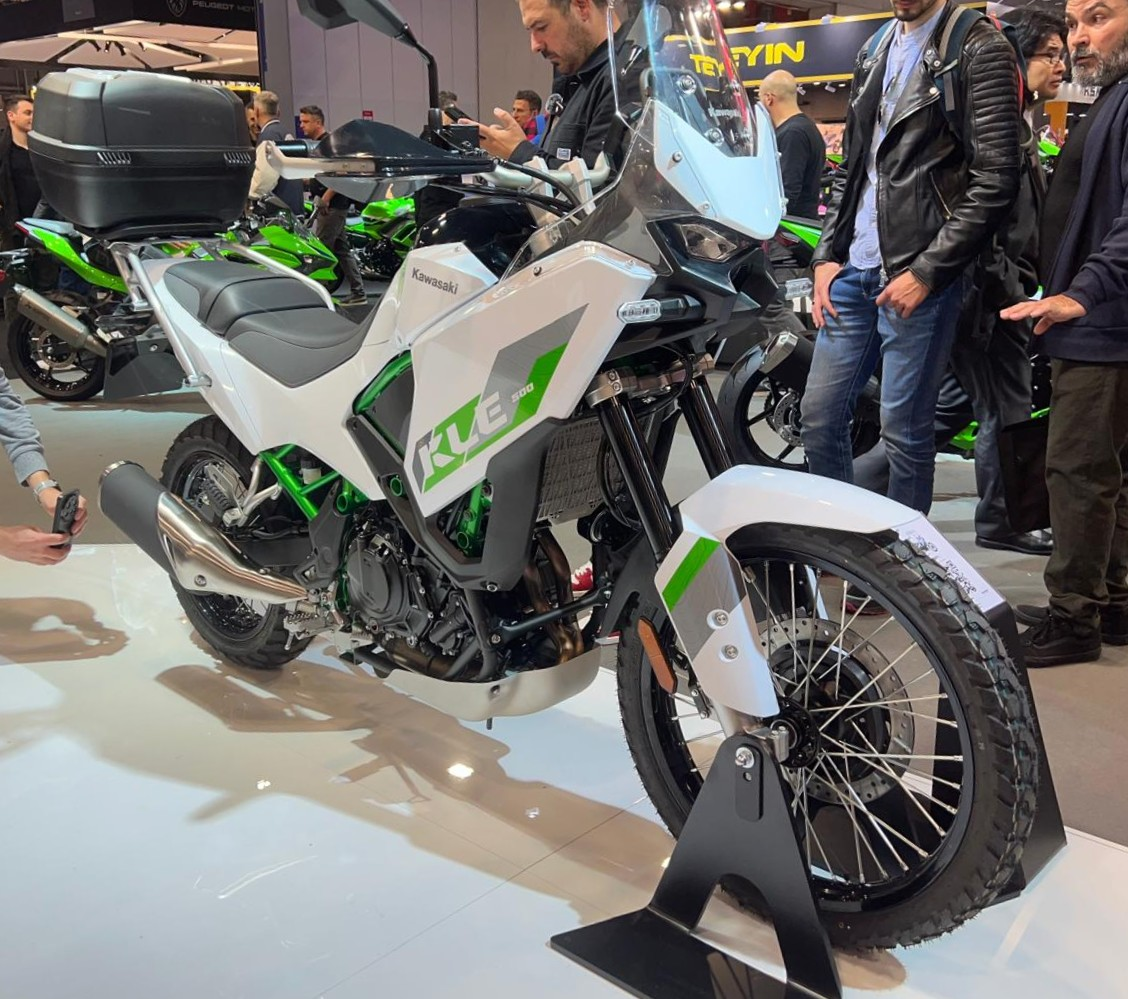
- Manufacturer: Kawasaki Motors
- Parent company: Kawasaki Heavy Industries
- Production: 1991–present
- Successor: Kawasaki Versys 650 (KLE650)
- Class: Dual-sport
- Engine: 498 cc (30.4 cu in) liquid-cooled 4-stroke 8-valve DOHC parallel-twin
- Bore / stroke: 74.0 mm × 58.0 mm (2.91 in × 2.28 in)
- Compression ratio: 9.8:1
- Power: 45 hp (33.6 kW) @ 8,300 rpm
- Torque: 41 N⋅m (30.2 lb⋅ft) @ 7,500 rpm
- Ignition type: CDI
- Transmission: 6-speed manual, chain final drive
- Frame type: Steel double cradle
- Suspension: Front: 41 mm (1.6 in) telescopic fork Rear: Swingarm with monoshock and adjustable spring preload
- Brakes: Front: Dual-piston caliper with single floating 300 mm (11.8 in) disc Rear: Dual-piston caliper with single 230 mm (9.1 in) disc
- Tires: Front: 90/90-21; Rear: 130/80-17
- Wheelbase: 1,510 mm (59.4 in)
- Dimensions: L: 2,215 mm (87.2 in); W: 880 mm (34.6 in); H: 1,270 mm (50.0 in)
- Seat height: 850 mm (33.5 in)
- Fuel capacity: 15 L (4.0 US gal)
- Related: Kawasaki KLR650; Kawasaki Ninja 500R

The Kawasaki KLE500 is a dual-sport motorcycle produced by Japanese manufacturer Kawasaki. Introduced in 1991, it is powered by a 498 cc (30.4 cu in) parallel-twin engine. The KLE500 can be used both on roads and in light off-road conditions.

== Description ==
The KLE500 features a sump guard that provides protection to the oil pan during off-road usage. As for aerodynamic protection, it relies on a small windshield. However, depending on the rider's height, the head and upper torso might be exposed to the wind. The situation can be improved considerably with the use of windshield accessories, available as an accessory for the original Kawasaki model but also for other brands for the latest series, thanks to the interchangeability of parts with the widespread Z1000. The seat is wide enough to accommodate the driver and passenger. The bike is equipped with a large rear rack.

The instrumentation includes speedometer, odometer, tachometer, indicators for the turn signals and high beam. However, the instrumentation does not have a light indicating the use of the fuel reserve. For this, one can use the fuel valve manually operated to allow passage to the "reserve" position.

From the model year 2003 onward, any motorcycles produced lost the ability to turn off their low beams using a switch on the handlebars.

== 2005 changes ==
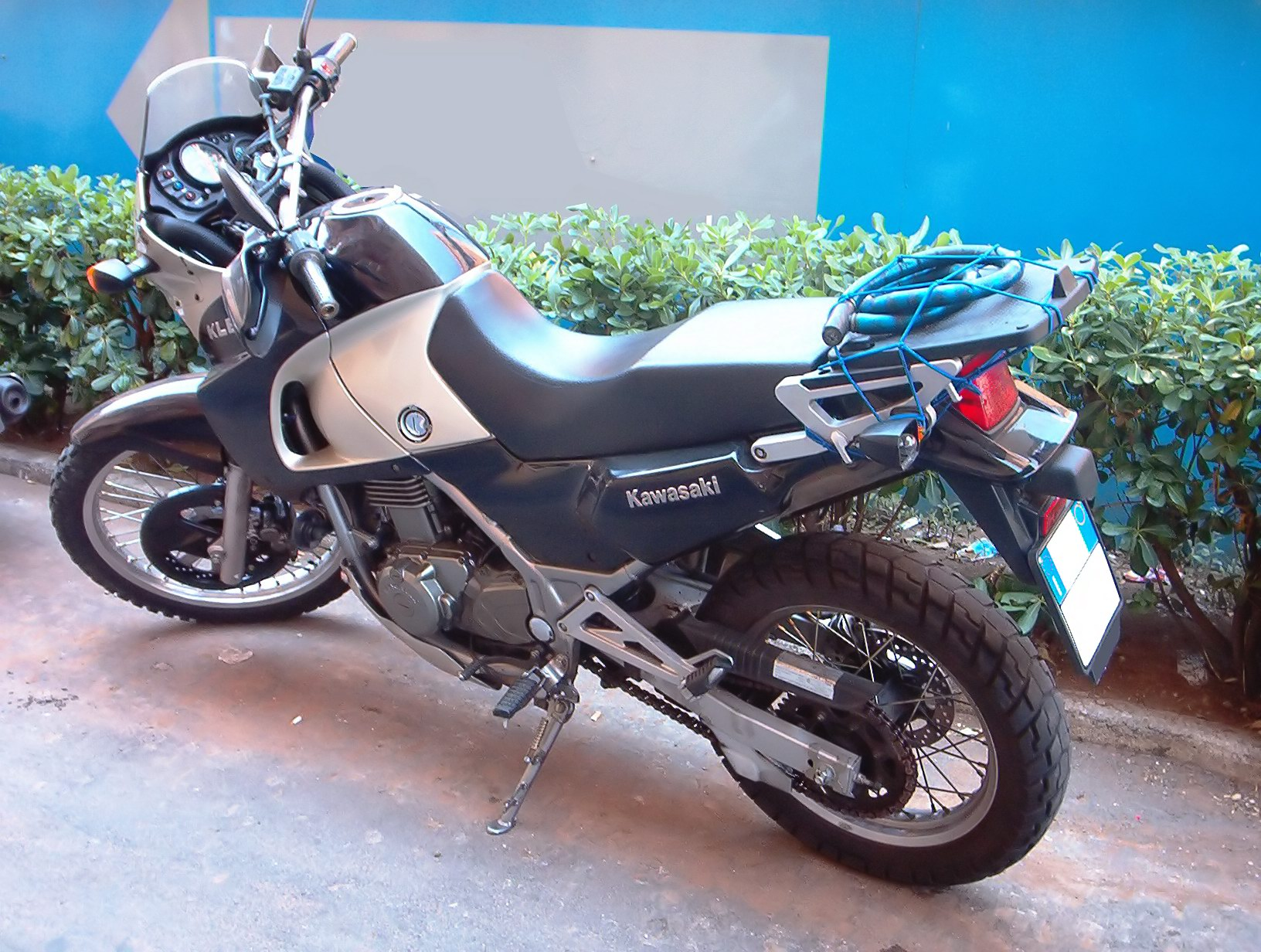
2005 KLE500

The changes in the 2005 model year stem from the need to update the KLE's anti-pollution system to the Euro 2 standard. Previous model characteristics were within the Euro 1 guidelines.

Given the need to renew the model, Kawasaki included a face-lift that rejuvenated the line. In particular, it redesigned the windshield making it similar to that of Z1000 and Z750, using the same glass unit. They also changed the turn signals and the instrument panel. The earlier fairing of the disc brake was removed.
