= Kawasaki Z800 =

Motorcycle made from 2013–2016

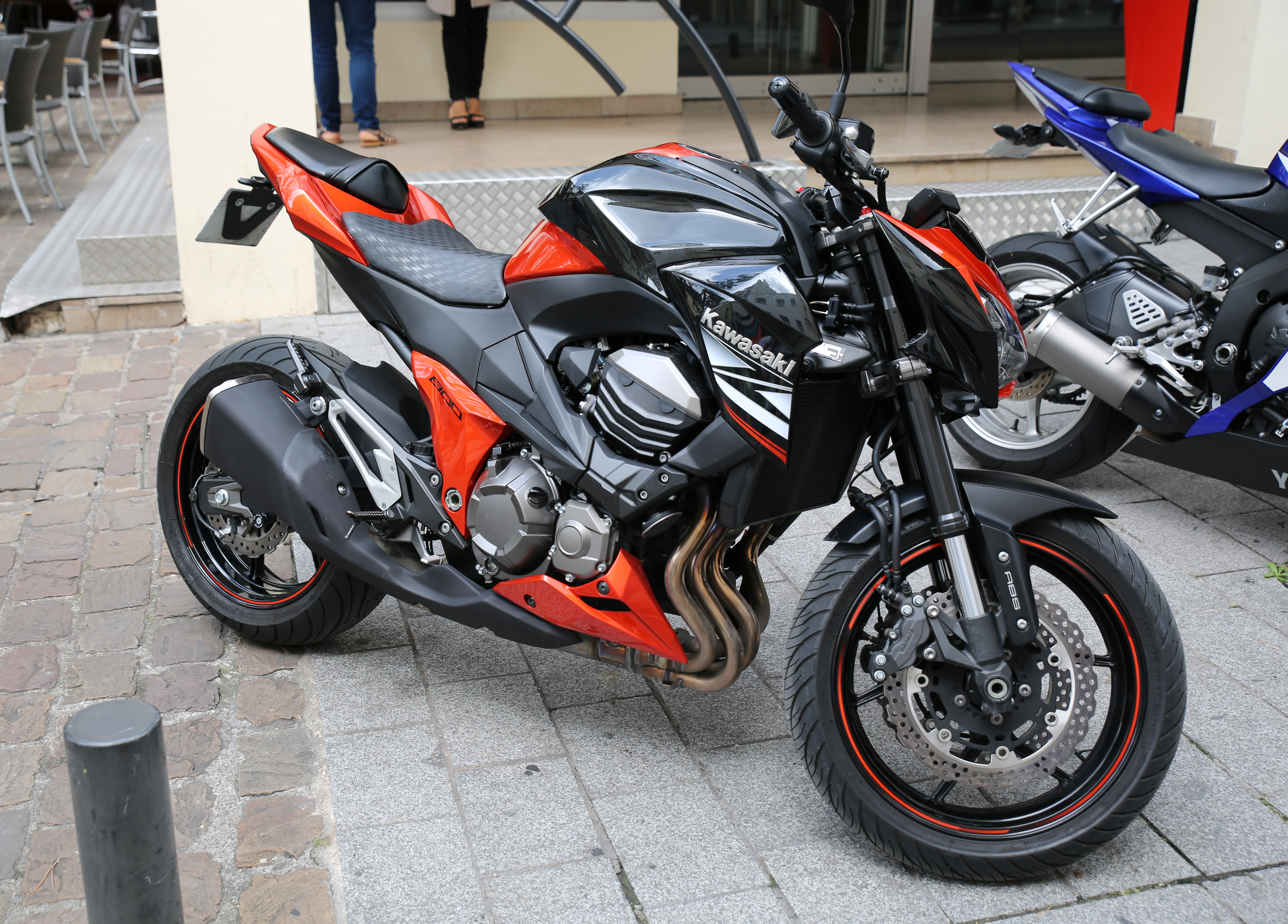
- Manufacturer: Kawasaki Motorcycle & Engine Company
- Parent company: Kawasaki Heavy Industries
- Production: 2013–2016
- Predecessor: Kawasaki Z750
- Successor: Kawasaki Z900
- Class: Naked
- Engine: 806 cc (49.2 cu in) liquid-cooled 4-stroke 16-valve DOHC inline-four
- Bore / stroke: 71.0 mm × 50.9 mm (2.8 in × 2.0 in)
- Compression ratio: 11.9:1
- Top speed: 262 km/h (163 mph)
- Power: 83 kW (113 hp) @ 10200 rpm
- Torque: 83 N·m @ 8000 rpm
- Transmission: 6-speed constant-mesh, chain final drive
- Frame type: Steel tubular backbone, stressed engine
- Suspension: Front: Inverted 41 mm (1.6 in) telescopic fork with rebound damping and spring preload adjustability; Rear: Bottom-link UniTrak horizontal monoshock with piggyback reservoir, stepless rebound damping and adjustable spring preload
- Brakes: Front: 4-piston caliper with dual 310 mm (12.2 in) petal-type discs; Rear: Single-piston caliper with single 250 mm (9.8 in) petal-type disc
- Tires: Front: 120/70-ZR17; Rear: 180/55-ZR17 or 190/55-ZR17
- Rake, trail: 24°, 99 mm (3.9 in)
- Wheelbase: 1,445 mm (56.9 in)
- Dimensions: L: 2,100 mm (82.7 in); W: 800 mm (31.5 in); H: 1,050 mm (41.3 in)
- Seat height: 834 mm (32.8 in)
- Weight: 231 kg (509 lb) (wet)
- Fuel capacity: 17 L (3.7 imp gal; 4.5 US gal)
- Oil capacity: 3.1 L (3.3 US qt). [when filter is not removed]. 3.4L(3.6USqt). [when filter is removed].
- Related: Kawasaki Z1000

The Kawasaki Z800 is a Z series four-cylinder standard motorcycle made by Kawasaki from 2013 through 2016, replaced by the Z900 for 2017.

== History ==
Using the nomenclature of the Kawasaki's Z series begun in 1972, the Z800 is the follow-up of the Z750 which had been introduced in 2004 as successor of the ZR-7.
