= Kawasaki Versys-X 250/300 =

Kawasaki Versys-X 300
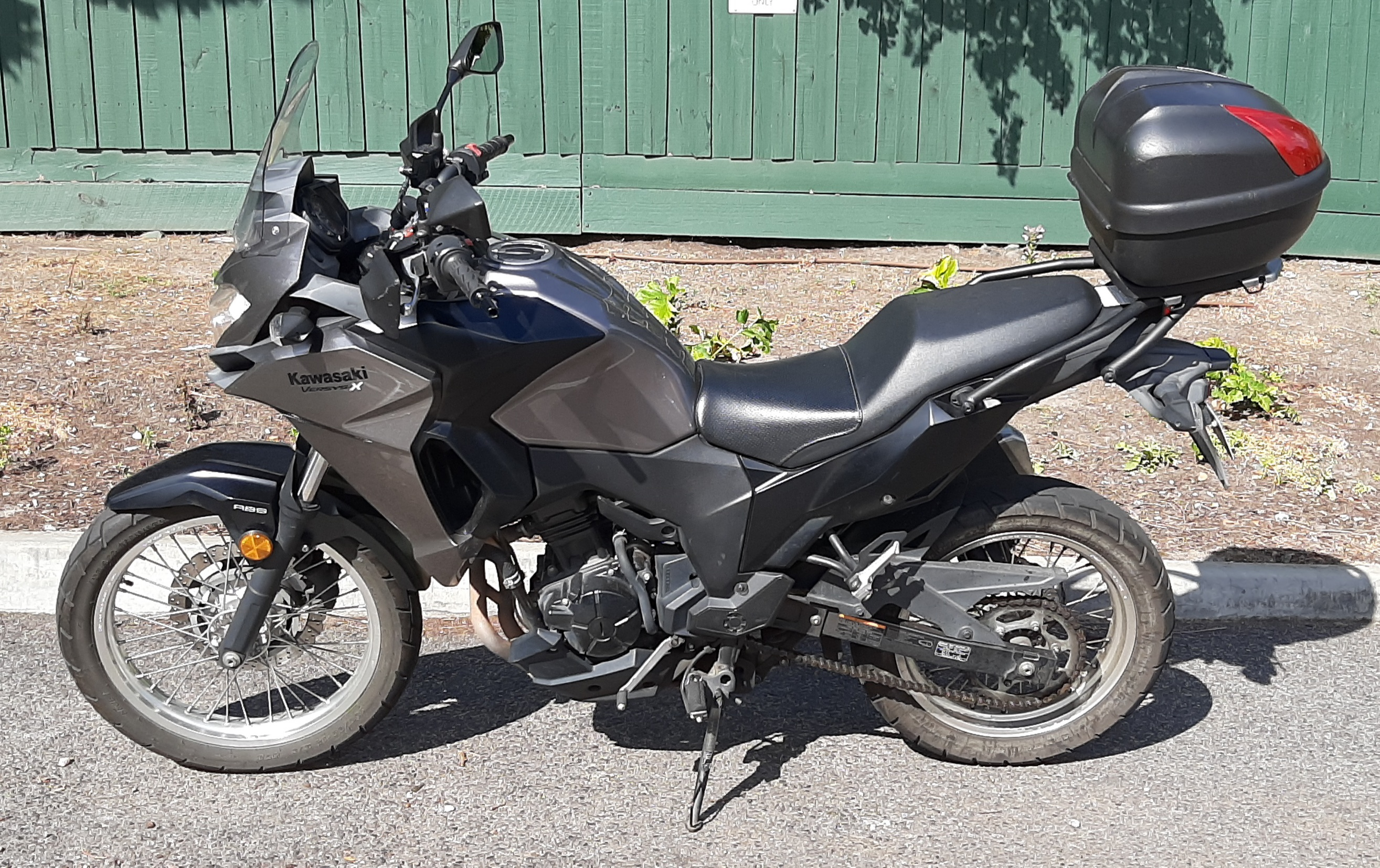
- 2017 Kawasaki Versys-X 300 with top box and handguards
- Manufacturer: Kawasaki Motors
- Parent company: Kawasaki Heavy Industries
- Production: 2017–Current
- Assembly: Rayong, Thailand
- Class: Standard or adventure touring crossover
- Engine: 296 cc (18.1 cu in) liquid-cooled 4-stroke 8-valve DOHC parallel-twin
- Bore / stroke: 62 mm × 49 mm (2.4 in × 1.9 in)
- Compression ratio: 10.6:1
- Power: 29.3 kW (39.3 hp) @ 11,500 rpm
- Torque: 19.0 lbf⋅ft (25.7 N⋅m) @ 10,000 rpm
- Ignition type: CDI
- Transmission: 6-speed constant mesh
- Suspension: Front: ø41 mm telescopic fork Rear: bottom-Link Uni Trak, gas-charged shock with adjustable preload
- Brakes: Front: single ø290 mm petal disc Rear: single ø220 mm petal disc
- Tires: Front: 100/90-19 Rear: 130/80-17
- Rake, trail: 24.3°, 108mm
- Wheelbase: 1,450mm
- Dimensions: L: 2170mm W: 860mm H: 1390mm
- Seat height: 815mm
- Weight: 175kg (wet)
- Fuel capacity: 17L
- Fuel consumption: 4.3 L/100 km

The Kawasaki Versys-X 300 is a member of the Versys range and has been manufactured since 2017 with yearly revisions. A 250cc version of this motorcycle is also available in four countries.

Kawasaki announced the model in late 2016 as the smallest model in its Versys range of motorcycles, which began production with the 2017 model year. Kawasaki introduced this model to cater for riders who wanted a lightweight, manoeuvrable motorcycle for commuting, touring, and light off-roading, at a lower price-point than the 650cc and 1000cc models. This 300cc model is also intended to suit shorter riders as it has a relatively low seat height of 815mm. An optional extended reach saddle is available which raises the seat height by 25mm. Its engine is the water cooled parallel-twin from the Kawasaki Ninja 300 but modified to deliver more of its torque at lower RPM to increase its off-road abilities. In the United States, the bike has optional ABS, however ABS is included for all models sold in the Japanese, Australian and Canadian markets. In Australia, the bike qualifies for the Learner Approved Motorcycle Scheme (LAMS) so riders on a learner's permit can ride it.

The transmission features an assist and slipper clutch which lightens the clutch lever pull and allows for more aggressive downshifting, and a positive neutral finder for easier shifting, common on Kawasaki bikes. The included tyres are Trail Winners made by Inoue Rubber Co., appropriate for majority road riding with some light off-roading. The wheels are spoked with aluminium rims.

== Versys-X 250 ==
This model has been manufactured since 2017 for the Japanese domestic market only. Since 2022, this model is also on sale in Indonesia, Malaysia and Thailand. Aside from the engine, which comes from the former Ninja 250, this model is almost identical to the Versys-X 300. The slightly smaller engine outputs 24.0 kW of power and 21.0 Nm of torque.

Produced since 2017, and the only available 250cc Versys model since 2020, the Versys-X 250 Tourer ABS comes with the features which, for the Versys-X 300, can only be bought as optional extras. These are: a set of 17 litre keyed-alike plastic panniers, a centre stand, engine guard bar, and a power socket. This model costs JPY 726,000.
