= Suzuki GSX-S1000 =

Standard motorcycle

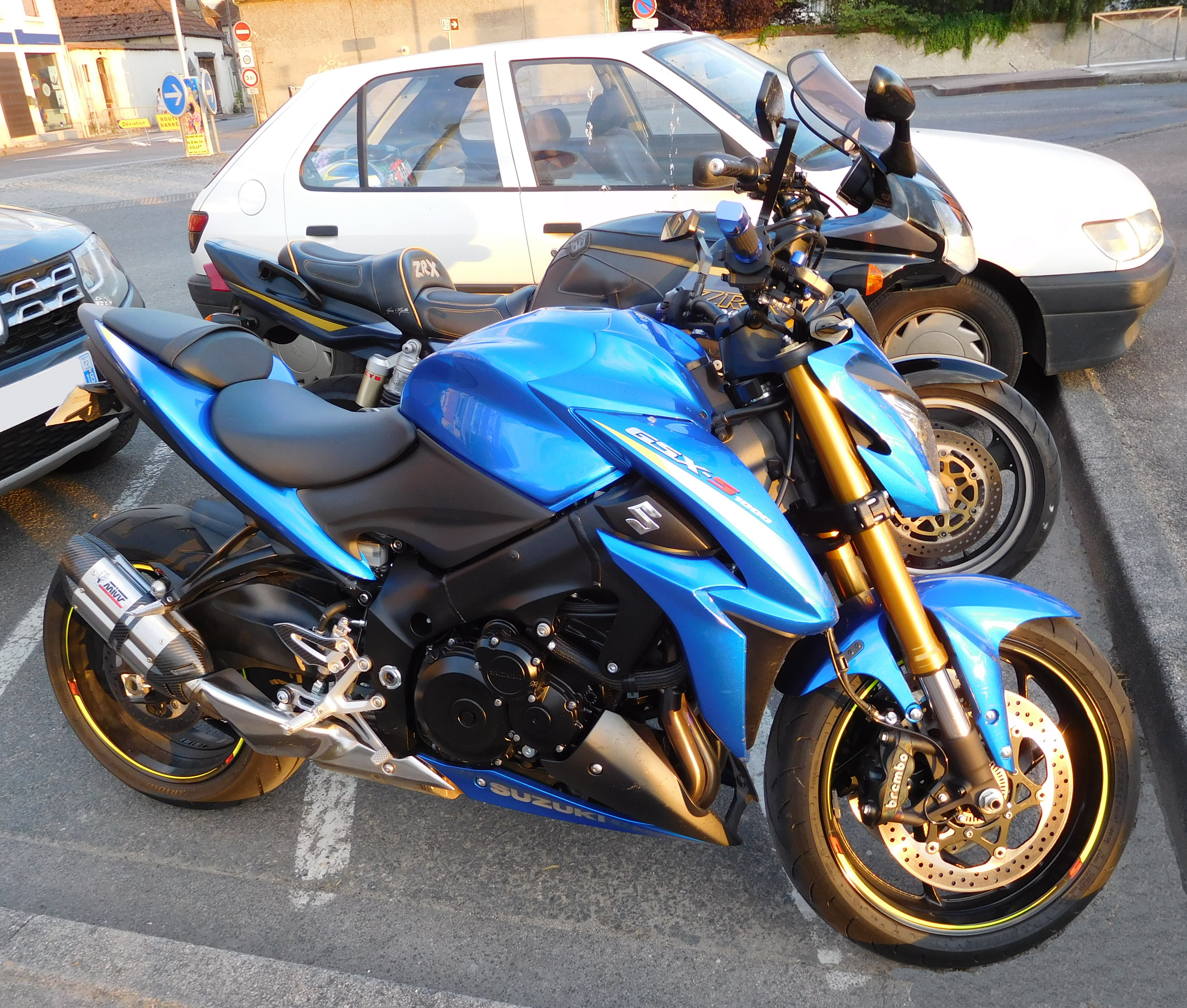
- Manufacturer: Suzuki
- Production: 2015–present
- Class: Standard
- Engine: 999 cc (61.0 cu in) liquid-cooled 4-stroke 16-valve DOHC inline-four
- Bore / stroke: 73.4 mm × 59.0 mm (2.9 in × 2.3 in)
- Compression ratio: 12.2:1
- Power: 150.8 hp (112.5 kW) (rear wheel) @ 11,300 rpm
- Torque: 79.6 lb⋅ft (107.9 N⋅m) (rear wheel) @ 9,400 rpm
- Transmission: 6-speed constant mesh
- Suspension: Front: Inverted telescopic, coil spring, oil damped Rear: Link type, coil spring, oil damped
- Brakes: Front: Four-piston caliper with dual discs Rear: Single-piston caliper with single disc
- Tires: Front: 120/70ZR17M/C 58W; Rear: 190/50ZR17M/C 73W
- Wheelbase: 1,460 mm (57.5 in)
- Dimensions: L: 2,115 mm (83.3 in); W: 795 mm (31.3 in); H: 1,080 mm (42.5 in)
- Seat height: 810 mm (31.9 in)
- Weight: 207 kg (456.4 lb); 209 kg (460.8 lb) (ABS) (wet)
- Fuel capacity: 17 L (4.5 US gal)
- Related: Suzuki GSX-S750, Suzuki GSX-R1000

The Suzuki GSX-S1000 is a standard motorcycle made by Japanese automotive manufacturer Suzuki. The GSX-S1000 debuted in 2015 in Japan and shares the same engine with the GSX-R1000 but is detuned, remapped, and restricted to lower-end RPM for commuting, fuel efficiency, emissions, and cruising at slower speeds.

The GSX-S1000 is also available in faired version called GSX-S1000GT (previously called GSX-S1000F), putting more emphasis on sport touring category as well as rivaling other naked liter-bike-derived sports tourer such as Kawasaki Ninja 1000 (faired variant of Kawasaki Z1000 respectively).

== 2017 Update ==
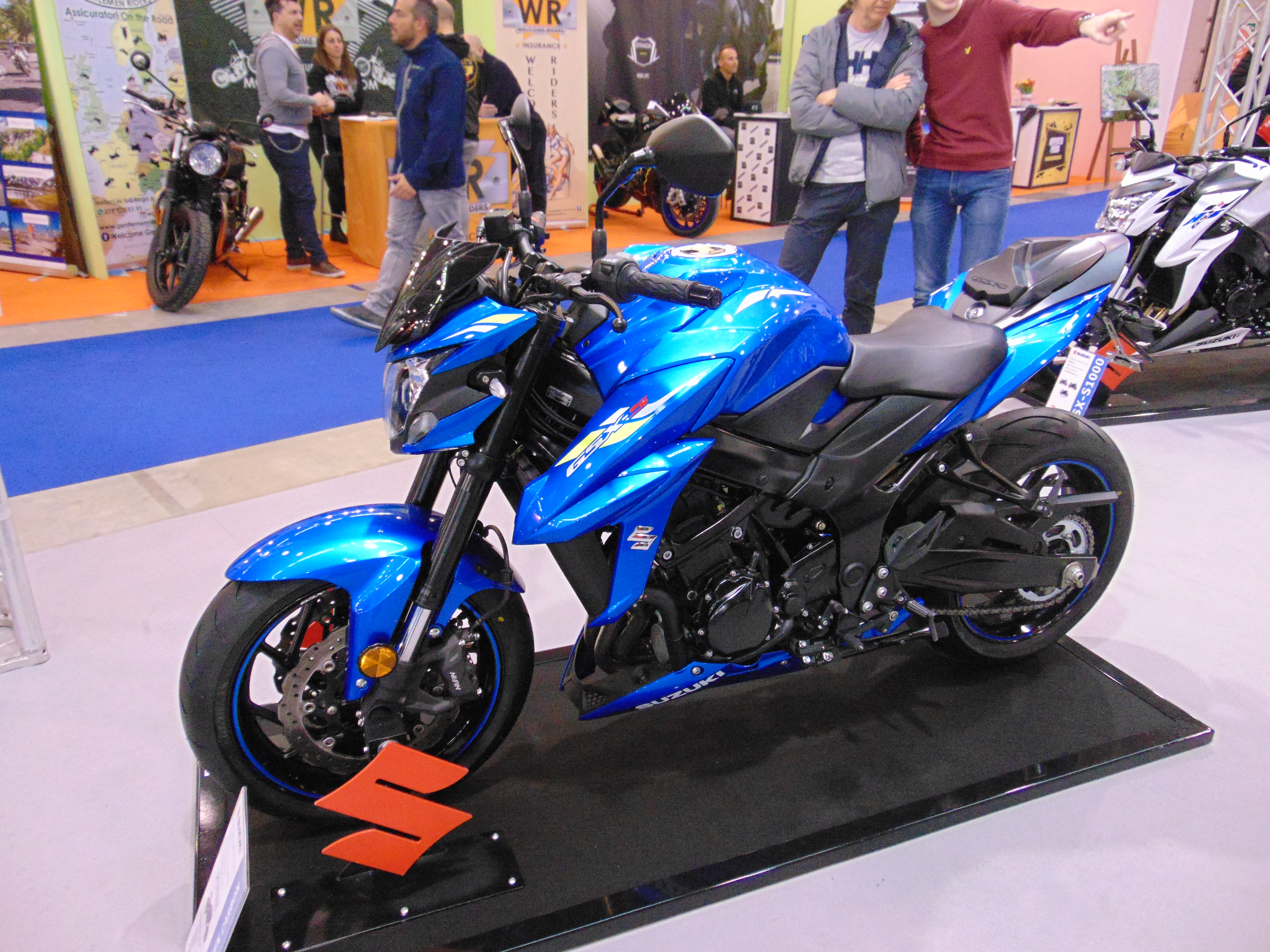
2015 GSX-S1000

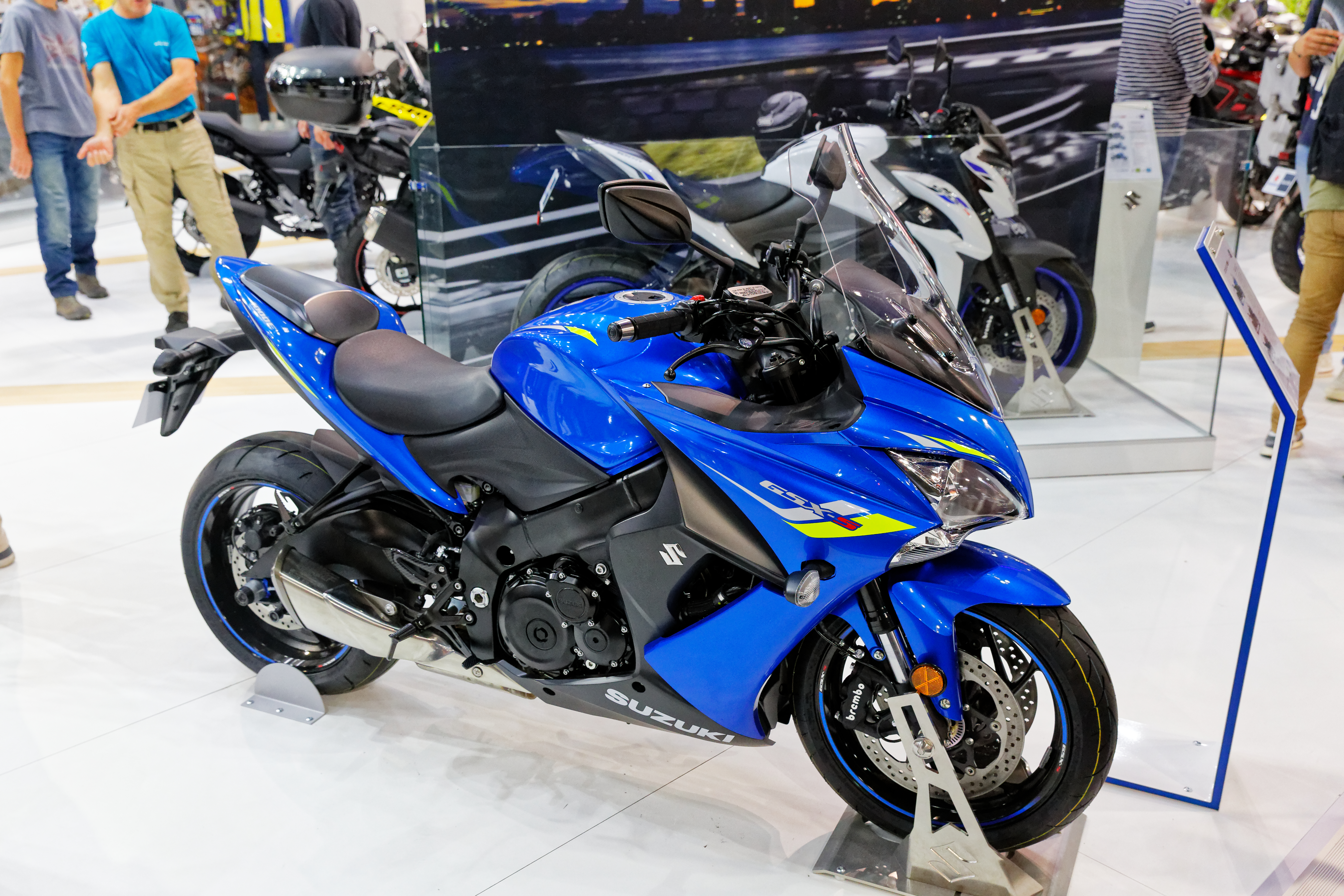
2018 GSX-S1000F

Suzuki updated the GSX-S1000 in 2017, increasing the engine power to 150 bhp and torque to 79.6 ft⋅lbf at 9,500 rpm.

It was fitted with a slipper clutch and has cosmetic changes such as black levers and foot pegs/controls.

The GSX-S1000F variant gained the same changes and also a tinted screen.

== 2021 Update ==
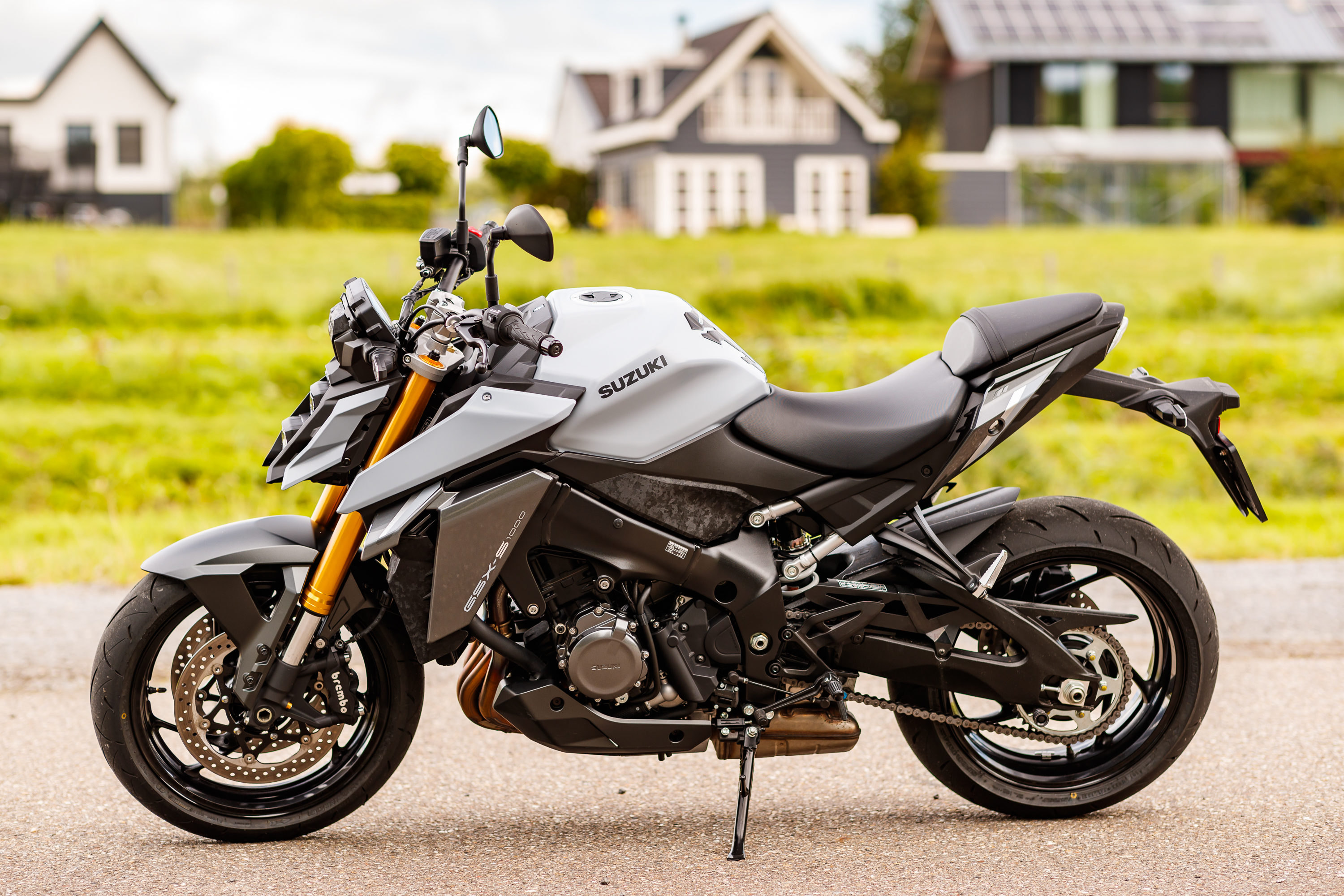
2021 Suzuki GSX-S1000

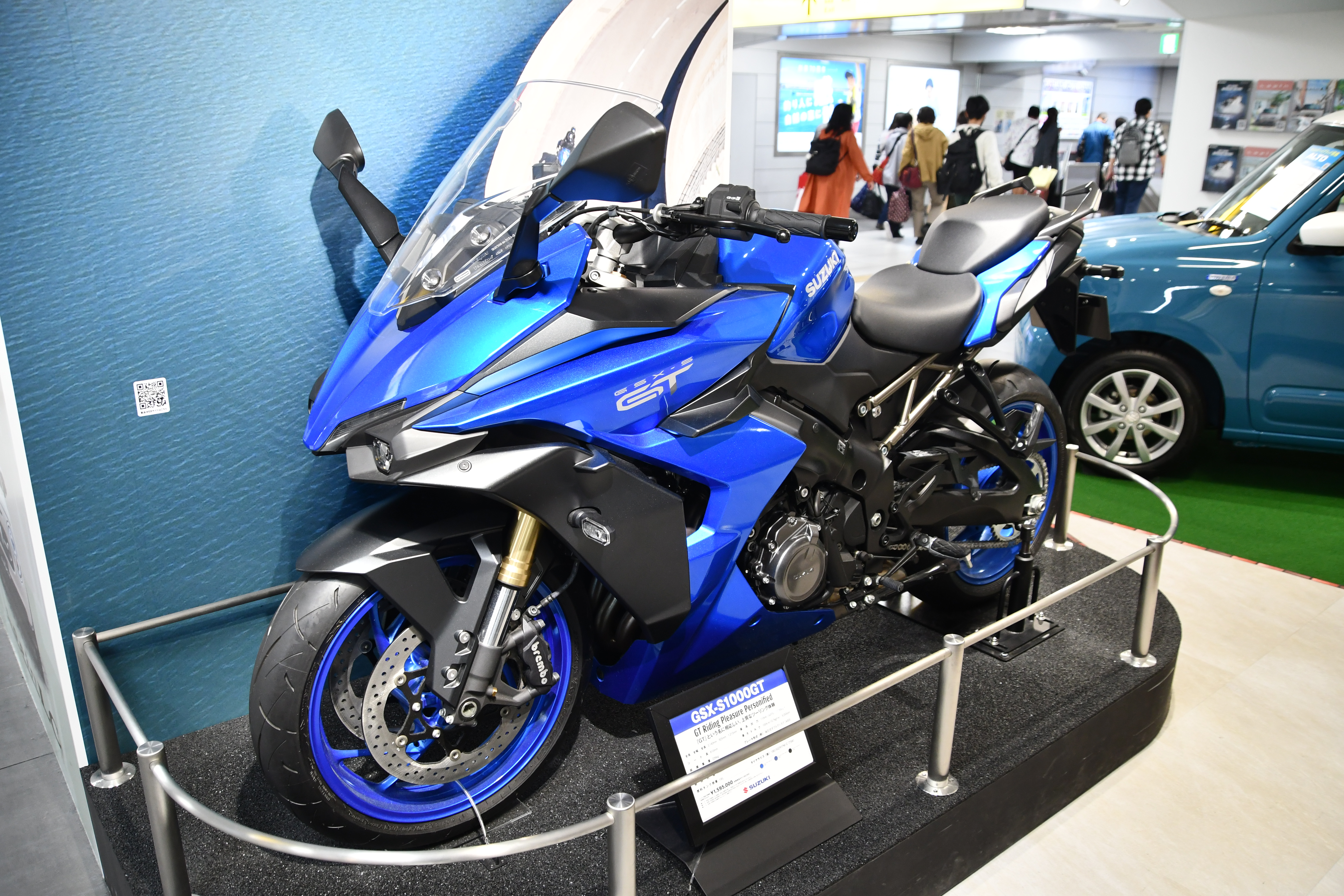
2023 Suzuki GSX-S1000GT

Suzuki updated the GSX-S1000 for 2021, in Europe first and in other markets for the 2022 model year.

Peak horsepower increased to 152 PS (112 kW; 150 bhp) and peak torque decreased to 106 N⋅m (78 lb⋅ft), albeit with increased average torque of 1.8% from 2000 to 11500rpm.

Externally, the bike has changed quite a bit, with an aggressive fighter jet-like vertical headlight design and cleaner look overall. The fuel tank has increased in size to 19 L (5.0 US gal).
