= Kawasaki Versys =

Family of motorcycles

The Kawasaki Versys is a family of adventure touring motorcycles manufactured by Kawasaki since 2007.

- Kawasaki Versys-X 250/300, 2017–present, based on the twin-cylinder Ninja 250R/300.
- Kawasaki Versys 650, 2007–present, based on the twin-cylinder Ninja 650R.
- Kawasaki Versys 1000, 2012–2024, based on the four-cylinder Z1000.
- Kawasaki Versys 1100, 2024–present, based on the four-cylinder Ninja 1100SX.
- Kawasaki Versys 900 (upcoming)
