= Kawasaki Z900 =

Standard motorcycle

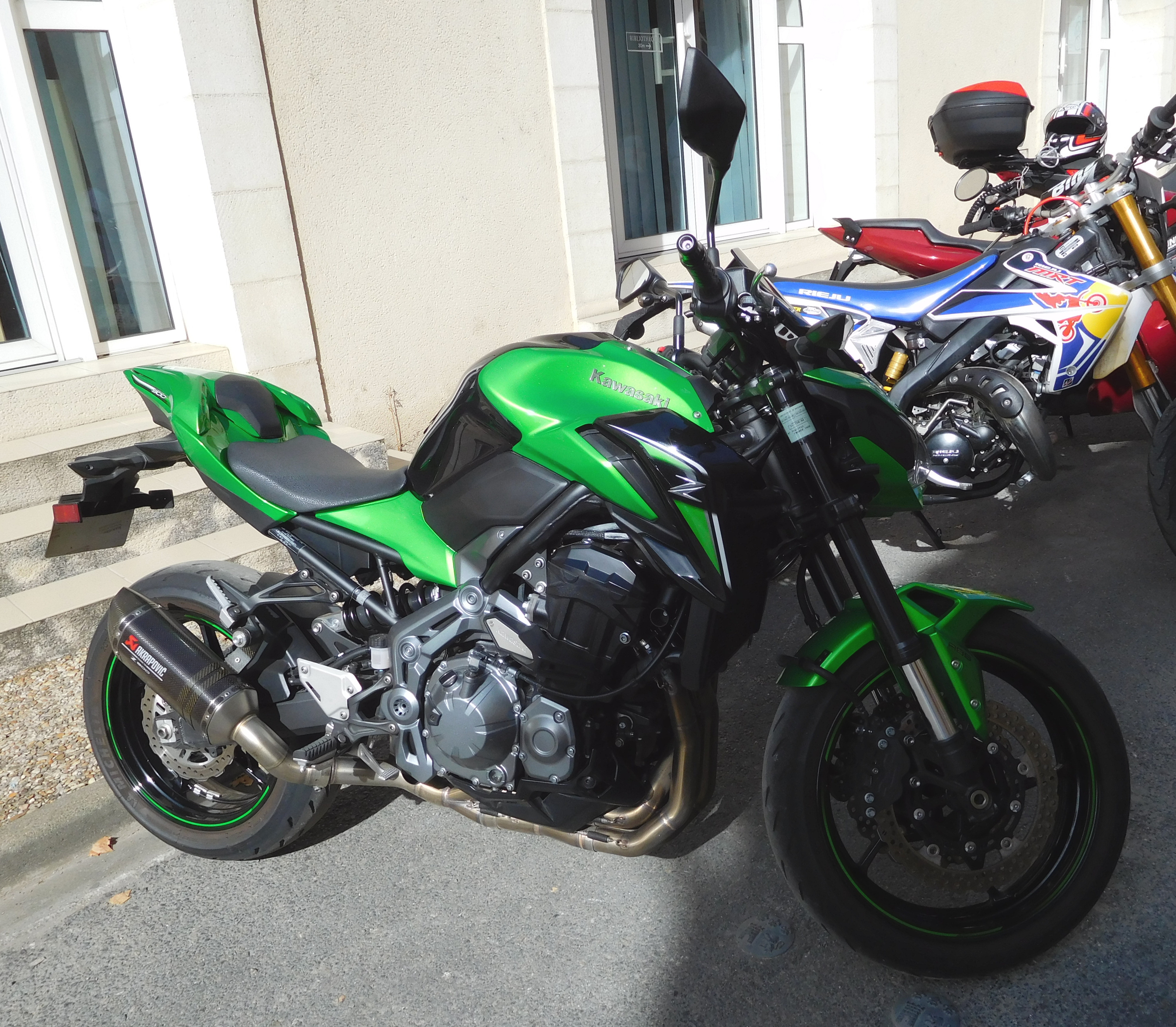
- Manufacturer: Kawasaki Motorcycle & Engine Company
- Parent company: Kawasaki Heavy Industries
- Production: 2017–present
- Predecessor: Kawasaki Z800
- Class: Standard
- Engine: 948 cc (57.9 cu in) liquid-cooled 4-stroke 16-valve DOHC inline-four
- Bore / stroke: 73.4 mm × 56.0 mm (2.9 in × 2.2 in)
- Compression ratio: 11.8:1
- Top speed: 253 km/h (157 mph)
- Power: 92.2 kW (125 hp) @ 9500 rpm A2 35.0(47.46 hp)
- Torque: 98.6 N·m @ 7700 rpm
- Transmission: 6-speed constant-mesh, chain final drive
- Frame type: Steel diamond with truss structure
- Suspension: Front: Inverted 41 mm (1.6 in) telescopic fork with rebound damping and spring preload adjustability, 119 mm (4.7 in) wheel travel; Rear: Horizontal back-link, stepless rebound damping and adjustable spring preload, 140 mm (5.5 in) wheel travel
- Brakes: Front: 4-piston caliper with dual 300 mm (11.8 in) discs; Rear: Single-piston caliper with single 250 mm (9.8 in) disc
- Tires: Front: 120/70-ZR17; Rear: 180/55-ZR17
- Rake, trail: 24.5°, 104 mm (4.1 in)
- Wheelbase: 1,450 mm (57.1 in)
- Dimensions: L: 2,115 mm (83.3 in); W: 825 mm (32.5 in); H: 1,065 mm (41.9 in)
- Seat height: 795 mm (31.3 in)
- Fuel capacity: 17 L (3.7 imp gal; 4.5 US gal)
- Related: Kawasaki Z1000

The Kawasaki Z900 is a standard motorcycle of the Kawasaki Z series made by Kawasaki since 2017. It replaced the Z800. It was the flagship model of the Z series until the Z H2 was released in late 2019, as a 2020 model.

2026 Kawasaki Z900

== Z900RS ==
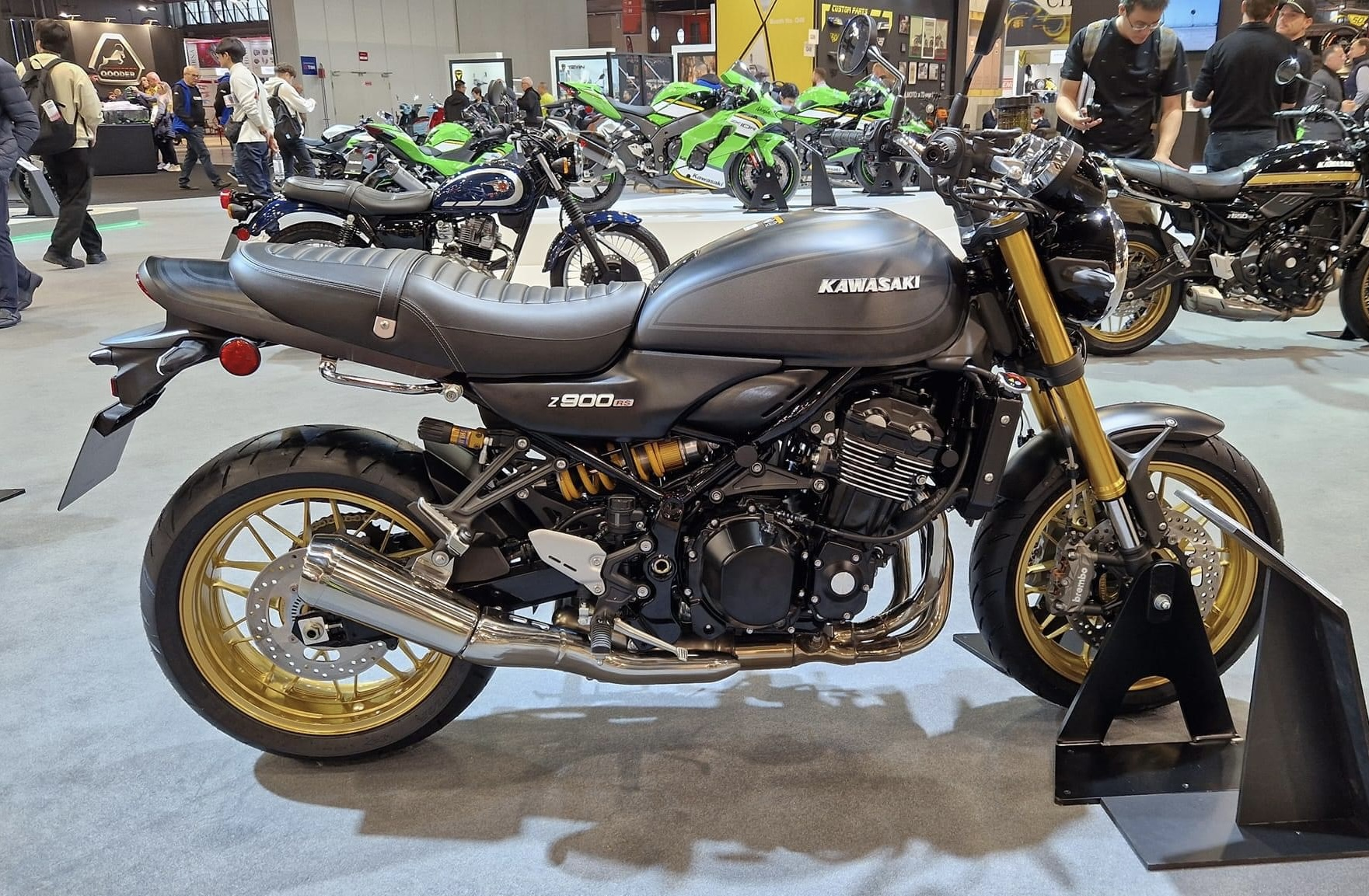
2025 Z900RS

The Z900RS is a retro-styled version of the Z900 first unveiled at the 2017 Tokyo Show. "RS" stands for Retro Sports; There is also a café racer version of the bike featuring front bikini fairing, lower handlebars and a taller seat. The Z900RS is designed to replicate the looks of the famous Z1 from 1972, and achieving so by building a slightly different subframe, tear drop tank and a duckbill tail. The engine is also tuned differently, and has a lower-pitched exhaust sound. It went on sale in Japan in December 2017, and arrived in the US in the following year.

The color option for the first year included a two-tone, Fireball orange and Candy-tone brown paint, black or green for the café version in the US. In 2023 the SE version became available in the US, which came with an Ohlins rear shock, golden front forks along with Brembo front calipers as well as the Yellow-Ball paint schemes.

In 2026, the Z900RS received a new 6-axis IMU for lean-sensitive ABS/Traction Control, cruise control, a quickshifter, revised engine internals (cams, compression) for better power delivery, a lighter flywheel, a new exhaust for improved sound, updated suspension, and smartphone connectivity.
