= Kawasaki Ninja 1000 =

Japanese motorcycle

Kawasaki Ninja 1000 SX
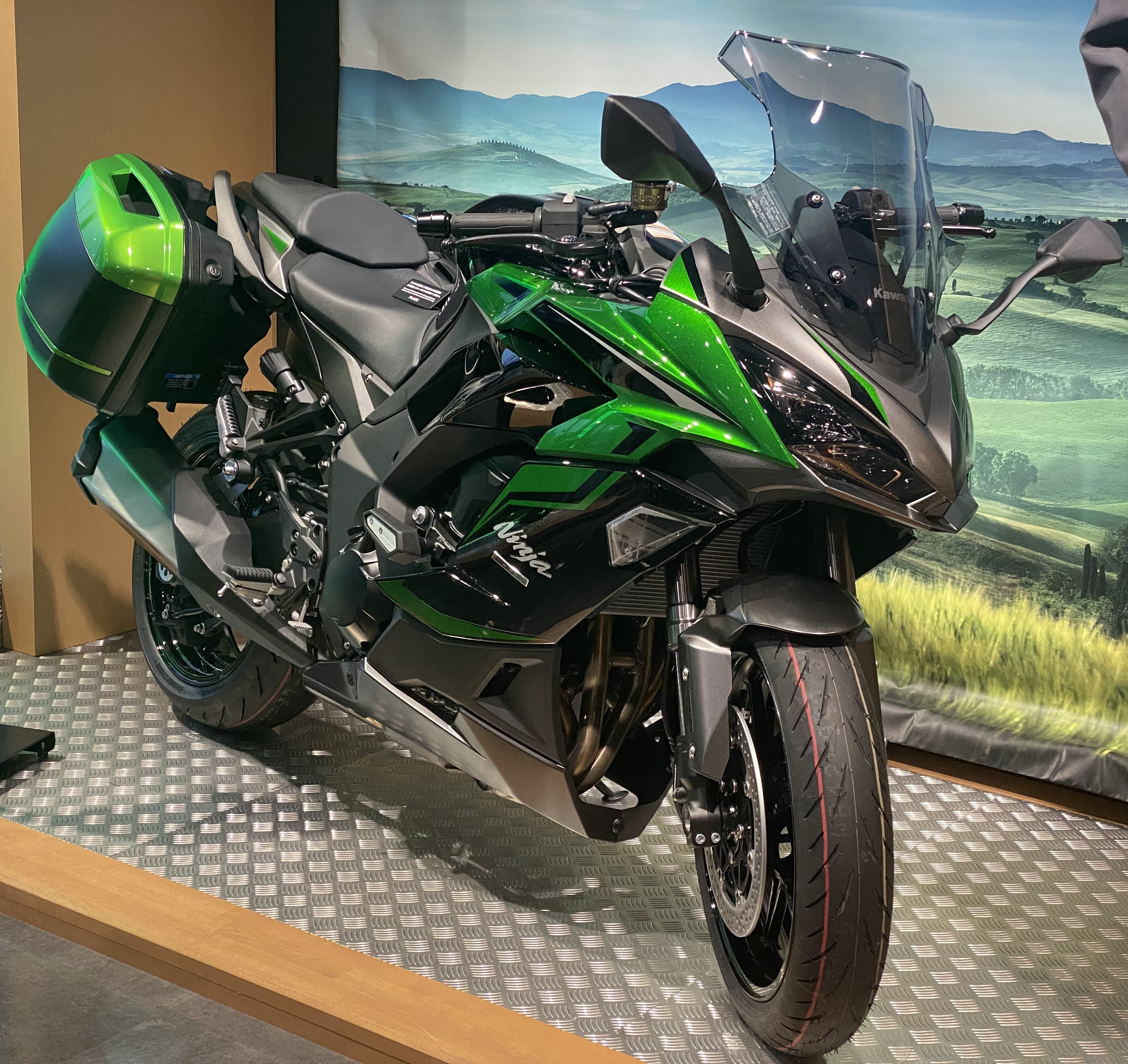
- 2024 Kawasaki Ninja 1000 SX
- Manufacturer: Kawasaki Motorcycle & Engine Company
- Also called: Z1000S/Z1000SX
- Parent company: Kawasaki Heavy Industries
- Production: 2011–present
- Successor: Ninja 1100SX
- Class: Sport touring
- Engine: 1,043 cc (63.6 cu in) liquid-cooled 4-stroke 16-valve DOHC tranverse four
- Bore / stroke: 77.0 mm × 56.0 mm (3.03 in × 2.20 in)
- Top speed: 152.8 mph (245.9 km/h)
- Power: 103 kW (138 bhp) @ 9,600 rpm (claimed); 93.3 kW (125.1 hp) @ 9,000 rpm(rear wheel)
- Torque: 98.54 N⋅m (72.68 lb⋅ft)(rear wheel) @ 8,800 rpm
- Transmission: 6-speed constant mesh
- Suspension: Front: Inverted 41 mm (1.6 in) telescopic fork with stepless compression and rebound damping, adjustable spring preload Rear: Swingarm with horizontal monoshock with stepless rebound damping, remotely adjustable spring preload
- Brakes: Front: Four-piston caliper with dual 300 mm (11.8 in) discs Rear: Single-piston caliper with single 250 mm (9.8 in) disc
- Tires: Front: 120/70-17; Rear: 190/50-17
- Rake, trail: 24.5°, 100 mm (4.0 in)
- Wheelbase: 1,450 mm (56.9 in)
- Dimensions: L: 2,110 mm (82.9 in); W: 790 mm (31.1 in); H: 1,230 mm (48.4 in)
- Seat height: 820 mm (32.3 in) (2017-2019) 815 mm (32.09 in) (2020-) 835 mm (32.87 in)
- Weight: 228.0 kg (502.7 lb) (2011–2016)(wet); 231.1 kg (509.4 lb) (2011–2016 (ABS equipped))(wet); 235 kg (518 lb) (2017–present) (wet)
- Fuel capacity: 19 L; 4.2 imp gal (5.0 US gal)
- Related: Kawasaki Z1000

The Kawasaki Ninja 1000 SX (sold in some markets as the Ninja 1000, Z1000S or Z1000SX) is a motorcycle in the Ninja series from the Japanese manufacturer Kawasaki sold since 2011. Other than its name, it is unrelated to the Ninja 1000R produced from 1986–89.

It is generally characterized as a fully faired sibling of the Z1000 streetfighter, sharing the same 1,043cc liquid-cooled, electronic fuel-injected, 16-valve four-stroke transverse engine and aluminum twin-tube backbone frame, but with ergonomics, storage, larger fuel tank and other design elements more oriented to the sport touring market. The Ninja 1000 is also fitted with an electronic speed limiter, not because it is capable of exceeding the 300 km/h (186 mph) agreed to in the gentlemen's agreement but apparently to keep its top speed the same as the unfaired and unlimited Z1000.

== Class ==
Kawasaki has positioned the bike as a "sport bike for the real world." As the model will not be homologated for racing purposes, the designers were free to make compromises for street performance. The Ninja 1000 thus has an upright seating position, large fuel tank, and adjustable windscreen among its features, as well a transmission geared for street-riding as opposed to racing. Nevertheless, it retains the large engine and aggressive styling of a sport bike, and its performance characteristics remain on the sport end of the spectrum, placing its sports-touring type more in competition with bikes like the Honda VFR1200F or Triumph Sprint GT as opposed to the Kawasaki's Concours or Yamaha FJR1300.

== History ==
=== 2011–2013 ===
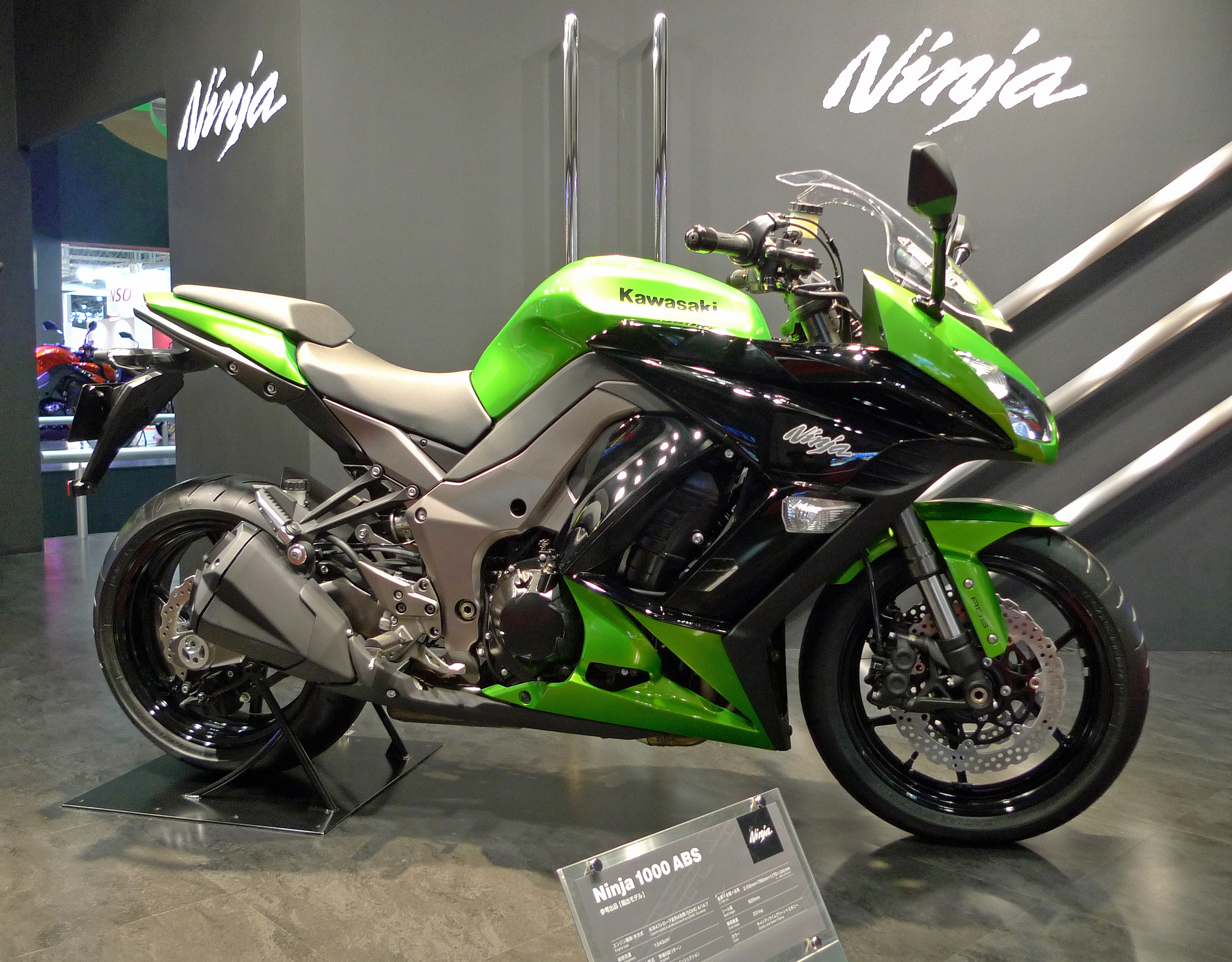
2011 Kawasaki Ninja 1000 SX

The Kawasaki Ninja 1000 was launched in 2011 and is based on the Z1000 naked bike, adding fairings, an adjustable windscreen, thicker rider and passenger seats, passenger grab handles, more fuel capacity (5.0 gallons), clip on handlebars, and rubber-covered foot pegs for rider and passenger.

The Ninja 1000 has a 501-pound wet weight and 56.9-inch wheelbase. The engine is a 1,043cc liquid-cooled, DOHC, four-valve-per-cylinder, in-line four cylinder that made a claimed 125.1 horsepower at 9,900 RPM, 74.4 LB torque at 8,800 RPM.

=== 2014–2016 ===
Main highlights of this series was the improved throttle response, and the addition of three-way traction control. These modes include power 3 (most intrusive), power 2, power 1 and 0 (to have it turned off). Additionally, there are two power modes as standard (mode A for 100% of the power, and mode B for 80% of the power). ABS was also offered as an optional extra. Brakes were changed to Tokico with more bite. Suspension received a revised damping rate with an option to customize the resistance, and shocks received heavier springs - both of which improve the ride quality. Other revisions included changes to the mirrors, seat, panniers and even some tweaks to the induction noise.

=== 2017–2019 ===
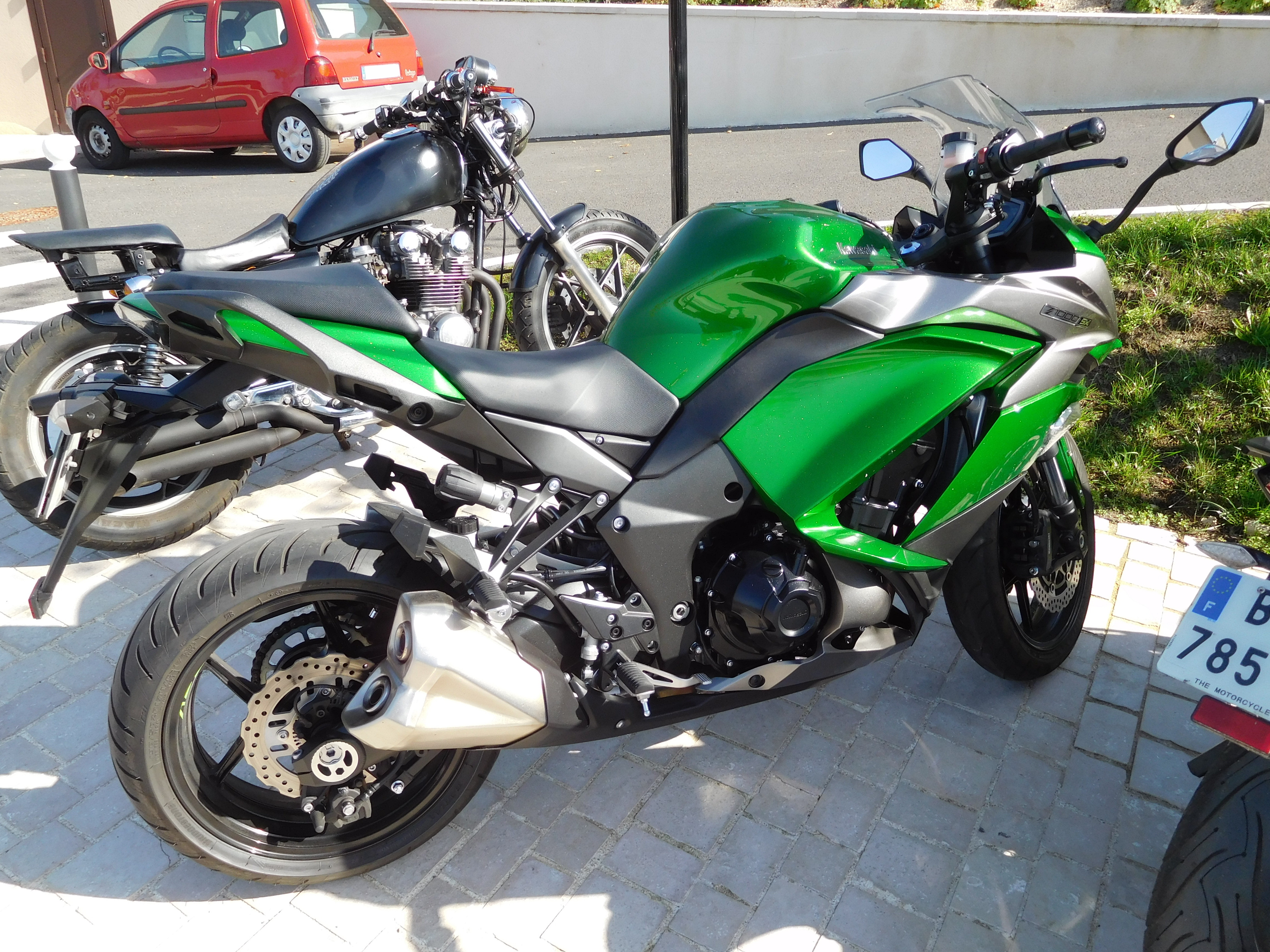
3029 Kawasaki Ninja 1000 SX

The updated 2017 bike received a wider front fairing and a taller wind screen, also the addition of a brighter LED headlight replacing the previous halogen light. New high level electronics include the addition of a six-axis IMU that works with ABS and traction control - all of which is now referred to as Kawasaki's KTRC and KCMF (Kawasaki Cornering Management Function). ABS now comes as standard. The new addition results in a new claimed wet weight of 518 lb (235 kg). Compliant with Euro 4 rules, furnished with new styling and capable of competing with Suzuki GSX-S1000F, KTM 1290 Super Duke GT, MV Agusta Turismo Veloce and the Ducati SuperSport of 2017, the bike will contribute to the regained strength of the sports-touring class.

Other changes include a re-designed dash with gear position indicator, changeable rev limiter and ambient temperature sensors. The exhaust system was also changed to conform to the Euro 4 rules.

=== 2020–2024 ===
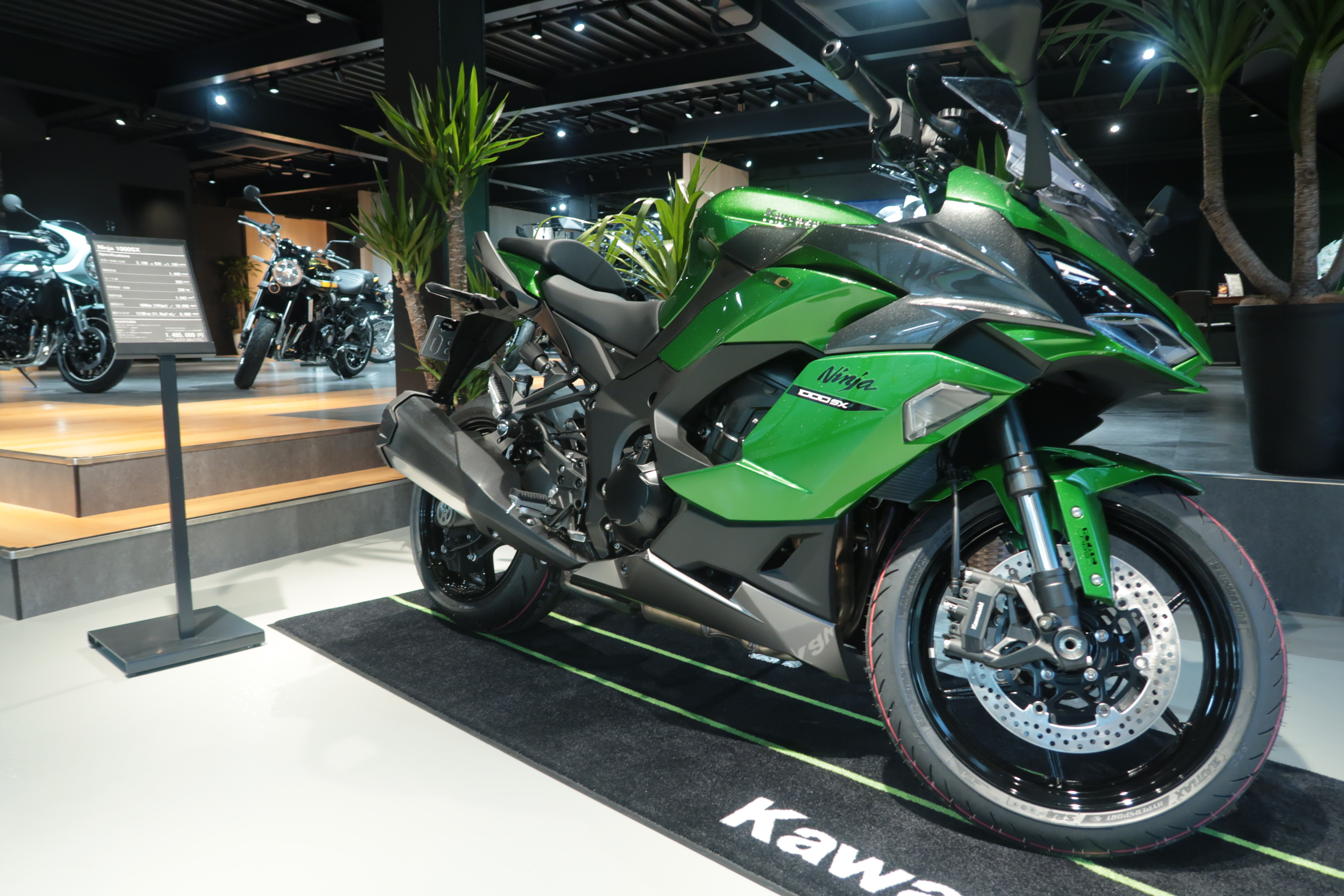
2020 Kawasaki Ninja 1000 SX

Unlike previous versions which had 2 different names (Z 1000 SX or Ninja 1000) in different countries, the name Ninja 1000 SX now is used in every country. This new version has the following changes :

- Single exhaust (on the right-hand side)
- Colour TFT dashboard with Bluetooth connectivity
- Up/down quickshifter
- Euro 5 ready
- Cruise control
- Thicker seat padding
- 4 riding modes : Sport, Road, Rain, Rider (configurable)
- Shortened trail (98 mm [3.9 in]) to enhance handling even more
- Revised fork internals to improve shock absorption
- S22 tyres
- Ride by wire (electronic throttle)
- Revised camshaft profiles with reduced tappet noise
- Two shorter 45 mm (1.8 in) intake funnels on cylinders one and four

=== 2025–present ===
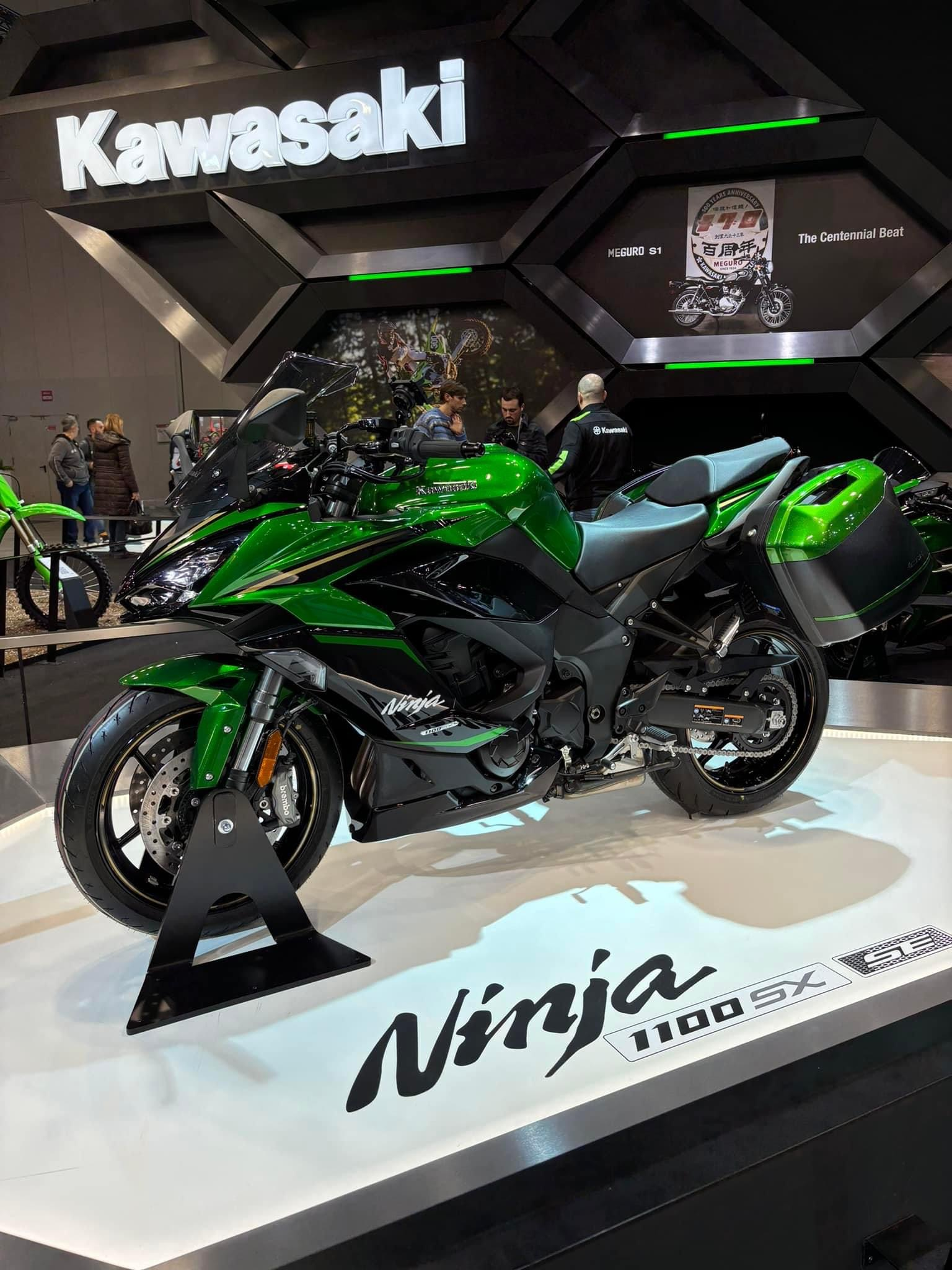
2025 Kawasaki Ninja 1100 SX

The new model uses a 1099 cc engine alongside the Special Edition models.

== Specifications ==
	2011–2013	2014–2016	2017–2019	2020–2024	2025–present Kawasaki Ninja 1100 SX
Engine
Engine Type	1,043 cc liquid-cooled, 4-stroke inline four				1,099 cc liquid-cooled, 4-stroke inline four
Bore x Stroke	77.0 × 56.0 mm				77.0 × 59.0 mm
Compression Ratio	11.8:1				
Valve System	DOHC, 16-valve				
Fuel System	Fuel injection: 38 mm × 4 (Keihin) with oval sub-throttles				DFI® with 38mm electronic throttle valves
Ignition	Digital				TCBI with Digital Advance
Starting System	Electric				
Lubrication	Forced lubrication, wet sump		Forced lubrication, wet sump with oil cooler		
Brakes & Suspension
Brakes	Front: dual semi-floating 300 mm (12 in) petal discs dual radial-mount, opposed 4-piston Rear: single 250 mm (9.8 in) petal disc single-piston			no longer of petal design	Front: Dual 300mm discs with radial-mount 4-piston Brembo M4.32 monobloc calipers (SE version) Rear: Single 260mm disc with single-piston caliper
Front suspension	41 mm (1.6 in) inverted fork with stepless compression and rebound damping and spring preload adjustability				41mm inverted telescopic Showa fork with compression and rebound damping, adjustable spring preload/120 mm (4.7 in) (SE version)
Rear suspension	Horizontal Back-link, gas-charged, with stepless rebound damping and cam-style spring preload adjustability				Horizontal back-link, Öhlins S46 gas-charged rear shock with rebound damping, remotely adjustable spring preload/140 mm (5.6 in) (SE version)
Performance & Transmission
Drivetrain	6-speed, return, wet multi-disc, manual, sealed chain				6-speed, return shift with wet multi-disc manual assist & slipper clutch
Maximum Power	101.5 kW (136.1 hp) @ 9,600 rpm	104.5 kW (140.1 hp) @ 10,000 rpm			100 kW (130 hp) @ 9,000 rpm
Maximum Torque	110 N⋅m (81 lbf⋅ft) @ 7,800 rpm	111 N⋅m (82 lbf⋅ft) @ 7,300 rpm		111 N⋅m (82 lbf⋅ft) @ 8,000 rpm	113 N⋅m (83 lbf⋅ft) @ 7,600 rpm
0 to 60 mph (0 to 97 km/h)	2.5 sec	2.5 sec			
0 to ^{1}/_{4} mi (0. to 0.4 km)	10.5 sec	10.4 sec			
Fuel economy	5.8 L/100 km				5.6 L/100 km
CO2 emission	159 g/km			135 g/km	
Frame & dimensions
L x W x H	2,105 × 790 × 1,170/1,230 (high position) mm		2,100 × 790 × 1,185/1,235 (high position) mm	2,100 × 825 × 1,190/1,225 (high position) mm	2,100 × 805 × 1,190/1225 (high position) mm
Frame type	Aluminium twin-tube				
Trail	102 mm			98 mm	
Wheelbase	1,445 mm		1,440 mm		
Wheel travel front	120 mm				
Ground clearance	135 mm		130 mm	135 mm	
Fuel capacity	19 L (4.2 imp gal; 5.0 US gal)				
Seat height	820 mm		815 mm	835 mm	
Wheel travel rear	138 mm		144 mm		
Tyres	Front: 120/70ZR17M/C (58W) Rear: 190/50ZR17M/C (73W)				
Curb Mass	228 kg; 231 kg (ABS)	230 kg; 231 kg (ABS)	235 kg		234 kg (SE model); 235 kg
Steering angle	31° / 31°				
