= Kawasaki Versys 650 =

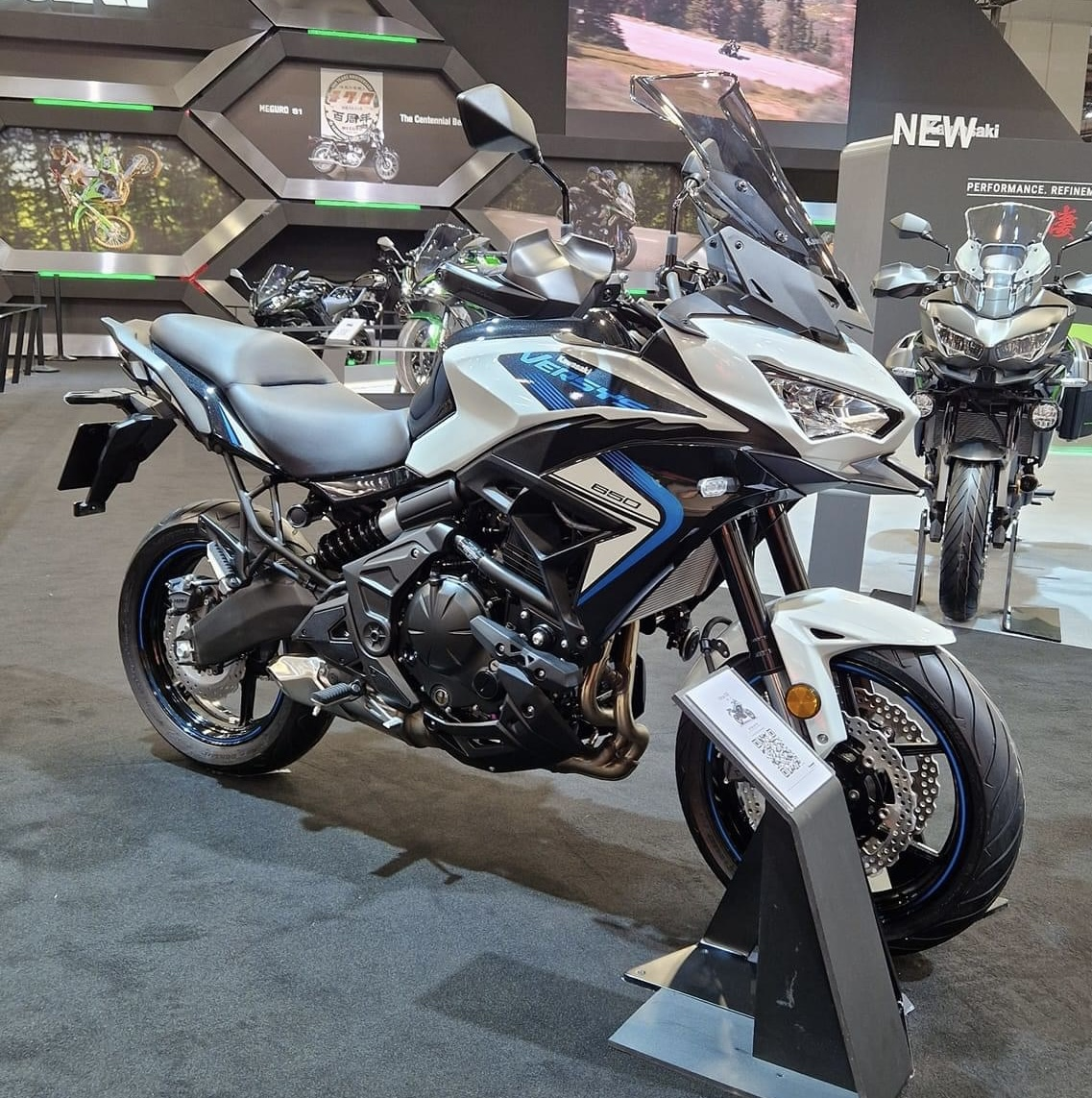
- 2025 Kawasaki Versys 650
- Manufacturer: Kawasaki Motors
- Parent company: Kawasaki Heavy Industries
- Production: 2007–Current
- Assembly: Rayong, Thailand; Manaus, Brazil
- Predecessor: Kawasaki KLE500
- Class: Standard or sport touring crossover
- Engine: 649 cc (39.6 cu in) liquid-cooled 4-stroke 8-valve DOHC parallel-twin
- Bore / stroke: 83 mm × 60 mm (3.3 in × 2.4 in)
- Compression ratio: 10.6:1
- Power: 67 hp (50 kW) @ 8,400 rpm
- Torque: 42 lb⋅ft (57 N⋅m)
- Transmission: 6-speed constant mesh
- Frame type: Steel diamond
- Suspension: Front: 41 mm (1.6 in) telescopic fork with adjustable rebound and preload, 150 mm (5.9 in) travel Rear: Single offset laydown shock with adjustable rebound and spring preload, 145 mm (5.7 in) travel
- Brakes: Front: Dual-piston caliper with dual 300 mm (11.8 in) discs Rear: Dual-piston caliper with single 220 mm (8.7 in) disc
- Tyres: Front: 120/70-17; Rear: 160/60-17
- Rake, trail: 25 degrees, 108 mm (4.3 in)
- Wheelbase: 1,415 mm (55.7 in)
- Dimensions: L: 2,125 mm (83.7 in); W: 840 mm (33 in); H: 1,330 mm (52 in)
- Seat height: 845 mm (33.3 in)
- Weight: 206 kg (454 lb) (wet)
- Fuel capacity: 19 L (4.2 imp gal; 5.0 US gal)
- Fuel consumption: 4.5 L/100 km (63 mpg_{‑imp}; 52 mpg_{‑US})
- Related: Kawasaki Versys; Kawasaki Ninja 650R

The Kawasaki Versys 650 (codenamed KLE650) is a middleweight motorcycle. It borrows design elements from dual-sport bikes, standards, adventure tourers and sport bikes; sharing characteristics of all, but not neatly fitting into any of those categories.

The name Versys is a portmanteau of the words versatile and system. It was introduced by Kawasaki to the European and Canadian markets as a 2007 model and to the US market in 2008. A California emissions compliant version was released in 2009. In 2010 new styling was applied to the headlight and fairings and several functional changes made including enlarged mirrors and improved rubber engine mounts. In 2015, a new model was introduced with a new fairing style that abandoned the older, stacked headlights for the more conventional twin headlight style commonly found on sportbikes.

== Technical details ==
The Versys is based on the same platform as Kawasaki's other 650cc twin motorcycles, the Ninja 650R and the ER-6n. It shares the same electronics, engine, wheels, brakes and main frame as its siblings. Where it differs is in riding position, rear sub frame, suspension components, and engine tuning.

The Versys' 650 cc liquid cooled, four-stroke, parallel-twin engine has been retuned for more bottom-end and mid-range torque. This is achieved with different camshafts and fuel injection mapping. These changes cause peak torque to occur at a lower engine speed and provide better throttle response in the 3,000 to 6,000 rpm range. In addition a balance tube has been added between the exhaust headers to smooth out power delivery. Power is 68 hp (51 kW) at 8,500 rpm, compared with the Ninja's 67 hp (50 kW) at 8,000 rpm. Torque is 47.2 lb⋅ft (64.0 N⋅m), compared with the Ninja's 48.45 lb⋅ft (65.69 N⋅m). Improving the engine's low and mid range response comes at the expense of a slight reduction in peak power however. A similar approach was recently deployed by Honda with their CBF1000 model. The engine uses a 180 degree crankshaft. This in turn requires an uneven firing interval (180 degrees, 540 degrees) which gives the engine note a distinctive "throbbing" sound at idle.

The suspension has greater vertical travel and more adjustability than the suspension on the Versys 650 siblings. On the front thicker/stiffer 41 mm inverted telescopic forks are externally adjustable for preload and rebound damping. The right fork leg carries a damping cartridge while both legs contain springs. The rear shock absorber is adjustable for rebound damping. Suspension preload is adjustable in the rear via a screw collar on the shock. 2015+ models have an external adjuster. The rear shock/spring is directly connected, without linkages, to a non symmetrical, gull wing, aluminium swing arm instead of the more basic steel swing arm used on the Ninja and ER-6.

== Local variants ==
In Australia, the Learner Approved Motorcycle Scheme (LAMS) is in place for riders on a restricted licence during the first period after passing their motorbike test. For this market the Versys 650L is manufactured and sold with output power restrictions put into place using a custom programme on the ECU and a screw installed near the throttle wheel on the right-side of the bike which prevents it from fully rotating. The specifications for the Australian LAMS and non-LAMS variants for the 2017 model year are below, but the different RPM measurements should also be noted:

Model	KLE650 (KLE650FHF)	KLE650L (KLE650FHFW)
Power	51 kW @ 8,500 rpm	41.3 kW @ 8,000 rpm
Torque	64 N.m @ 7,000	55 n.m @ 5,500 rpm

In addition to the above differences, Australia marketed Versys 650 and 650L are sold with a fuel capacity of 21 L and have a kerb mass of 216 kg (wet) for both the 650L and 650.

== 2022 update ==
In 2022 it received a color TFT display, Bluetooth, LED lighting, a 2-level traction control system, and a manually adjustable windshield.

The Tourer Plus was released at a price of ฿329,500 (US$10,303.31) in Thailand. In Germany, the Versys 650 starts at €8,595 (US$10,165.31).

== Reception ==
The Versys was reviewed by motorcycling media and received the following notable reactions.

- 2008 Motorcycle of the Year award by Motorcyclist magazine
- 2008 Best in Class "Allrounder class" award by Motor Cycle News
- 2015 Comparison Winner: Kawasaki Versys 650 LT vs. Suzuki V-Strom 650XT by Motorcyclist magazine
