= Kawasaki ZR-7 =

Motorcycle

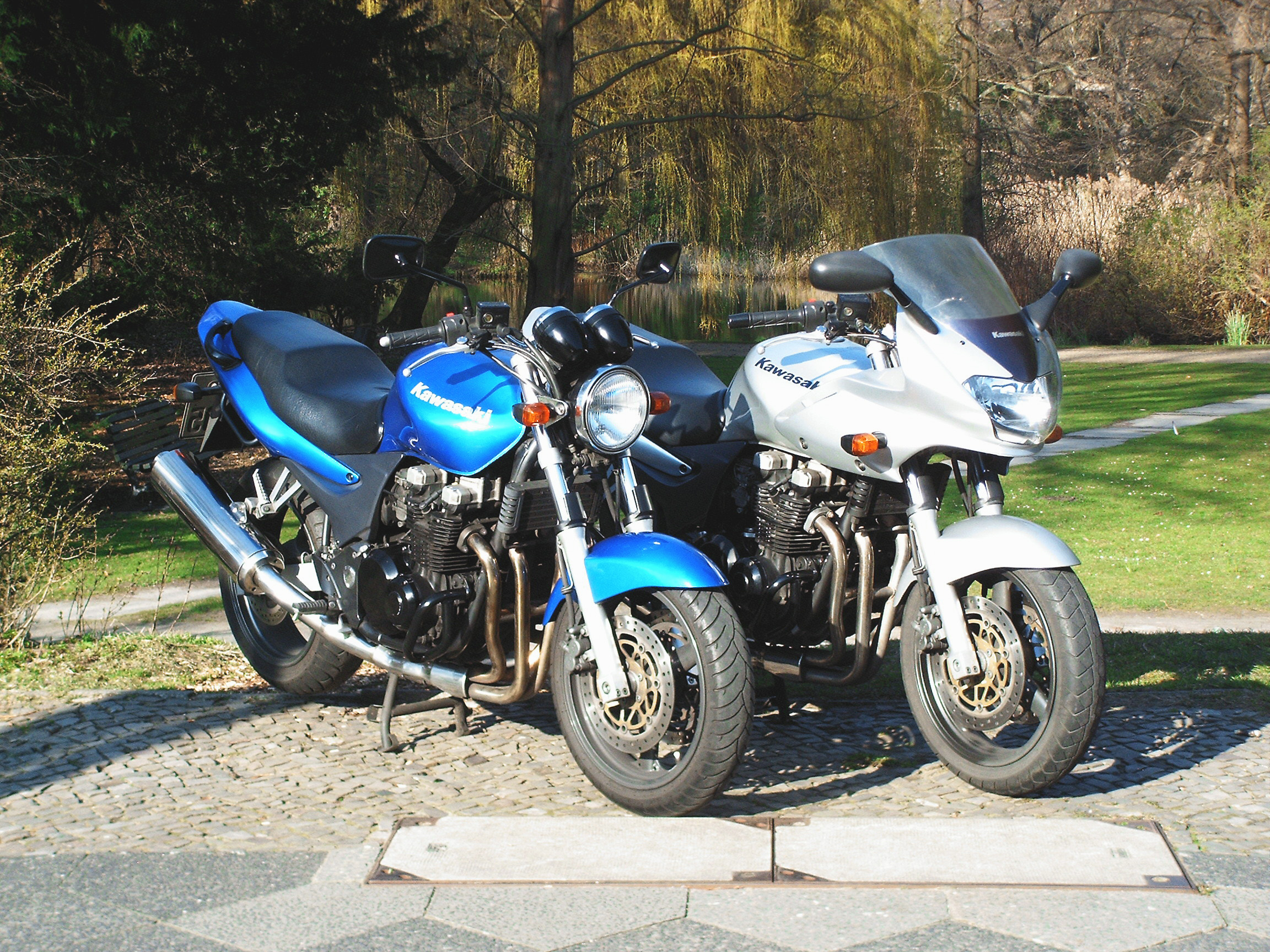
Kawasaki ZR-7 and ZR-7S

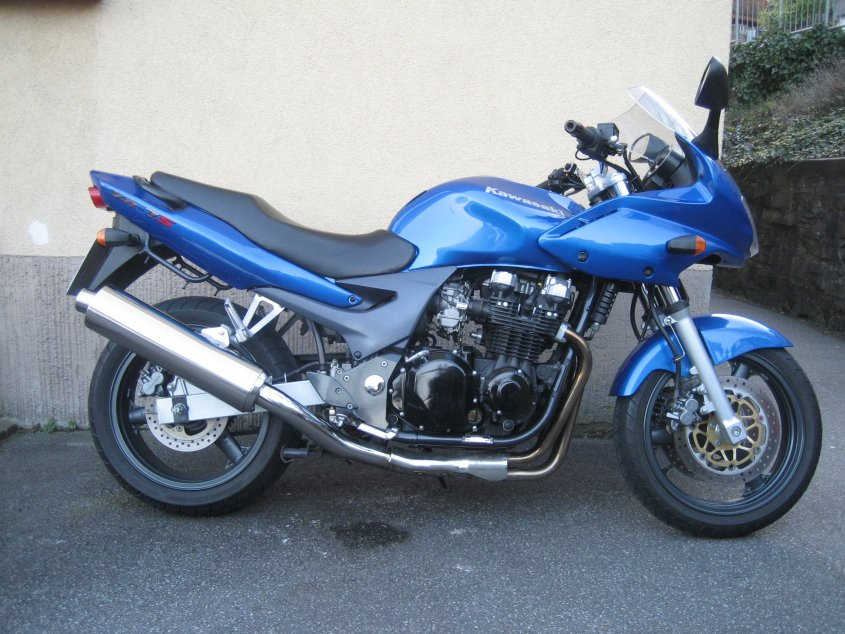
Kawasaki ZR-7S

The Kawasaki ZR-7 (and ZR-7S), (ZR750-H1 through ZR750-H5) is a standard motorcycle manufactured by the Japanese motorcycle manufacturer Kawasaki. It was sold in the United States from 1999 through 2003, and sold in a few other countries through the 2005 model year. The major differences between the ZR-7 and the ZR-7S models were the "S" model's fairing and associated headlight and instrument cluster, and stiffer fork springs. Both models are powered by an inline 4-cylinder 4-stroke, double-overhead-cam DOHC air-and-oil-cooled 738 cc engine, generating 57 kW and 63 N·m. Carburetors are four constant-velocity (CV) Keihin CVK 32 mm. Final drive is via chain; the transmission is a 5-speed (equipped with positive neutral finder), coupled with a wet clutch. Seat height is 800 mm. The ZR-7S has an advertised dry weight of 210 kg. The ZR-7 has a wet mass of 231 kg.

== Specifications ==
| Specification | Value |
|---|---|
| Overall length | 2,105 mm |
| Overall width | 785 mm |
| Overall height | 1,215 mm |
| Wheelbase | 1,455 mm |
| Road clearance | 130 mm |
| Seat height | 800 mm |
| Dry mass | 210 kg |
| Kerb mass (front) | 111 kg |
| Kerb mass (rear) | 117 kg |
| Fuel tank capacity | 22 l |
