= Kawasaki Versys 1000 =

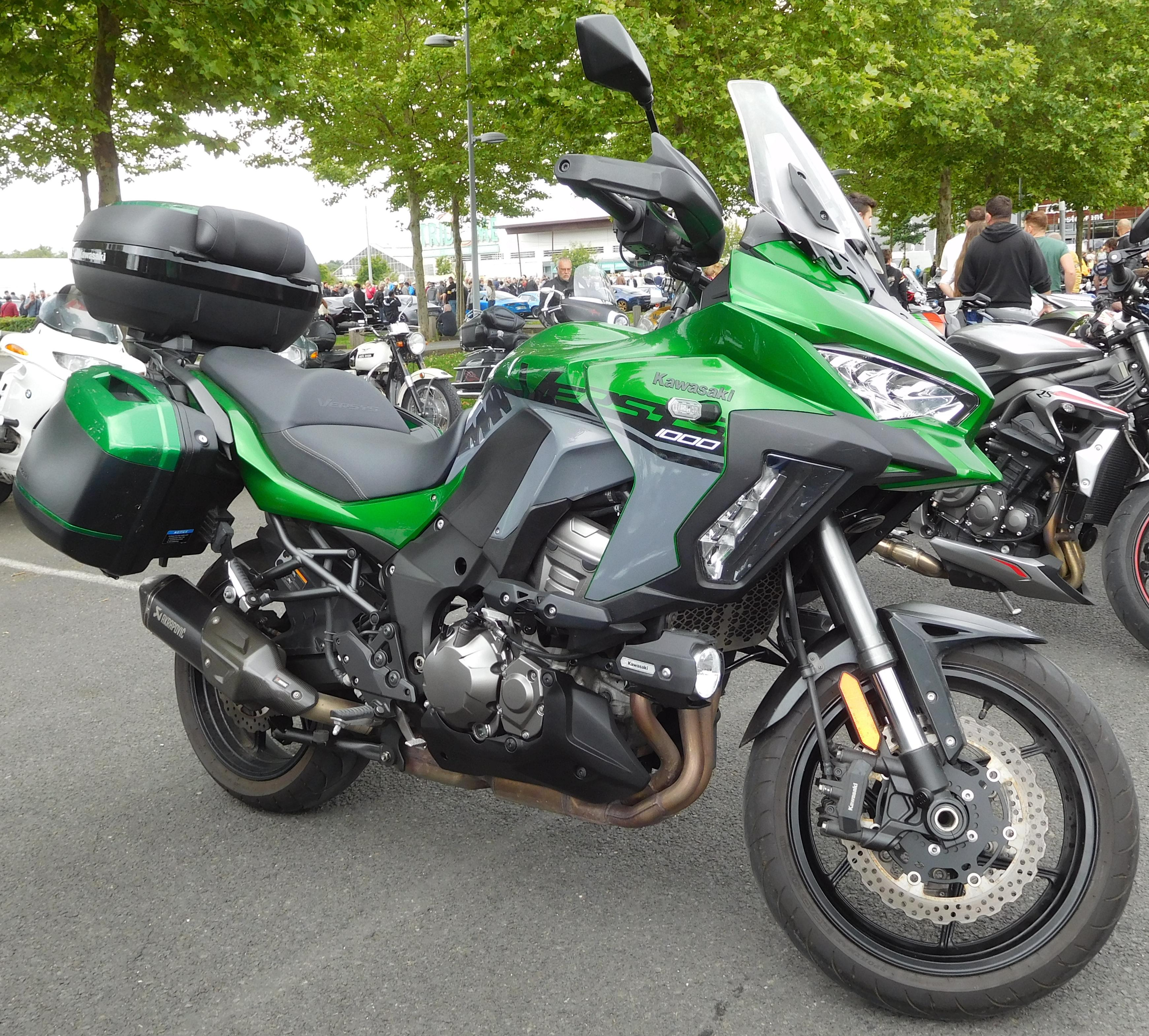
- Manufacturer: Kawasaki
- Production: 2012-2024
- Class: Sport-touring
- Engine: Liquid-cooled; 4-stroke; inline-four; 1,043 cm^{3}
- Bore / stroke: 77.0 mm × 56.0 mm
- Compression ratio: 10.3:1
- Power: 86.8 kW (116 hp) @ 9,000 rpm
- Torque: 102 N⋅m (75 lb⋅ft) @ 7,700 rpm
- Transmission: 6-speed manual; chain final drive
- Frame type: Twin-tube aluminium/steel (market/refresh dependent)
- Wheelbase: 1,520 mm (59.8 in)
- Dimensions: L: 2,240 mm (88 in); W: 845 mm (33.3 in); H: 1,400 mm (55 in)
- Weight: 239 kg (527 lb) (claimed) (wet)

The Kawasaki Versys 1000 is a sport-touring motorcycle produced since 2012 by Kawasaki. It uses a 1,043 cm^{3} inline-four derived from the Z1000 and is positioned as the largest model in the Versys family.

== Model history ==
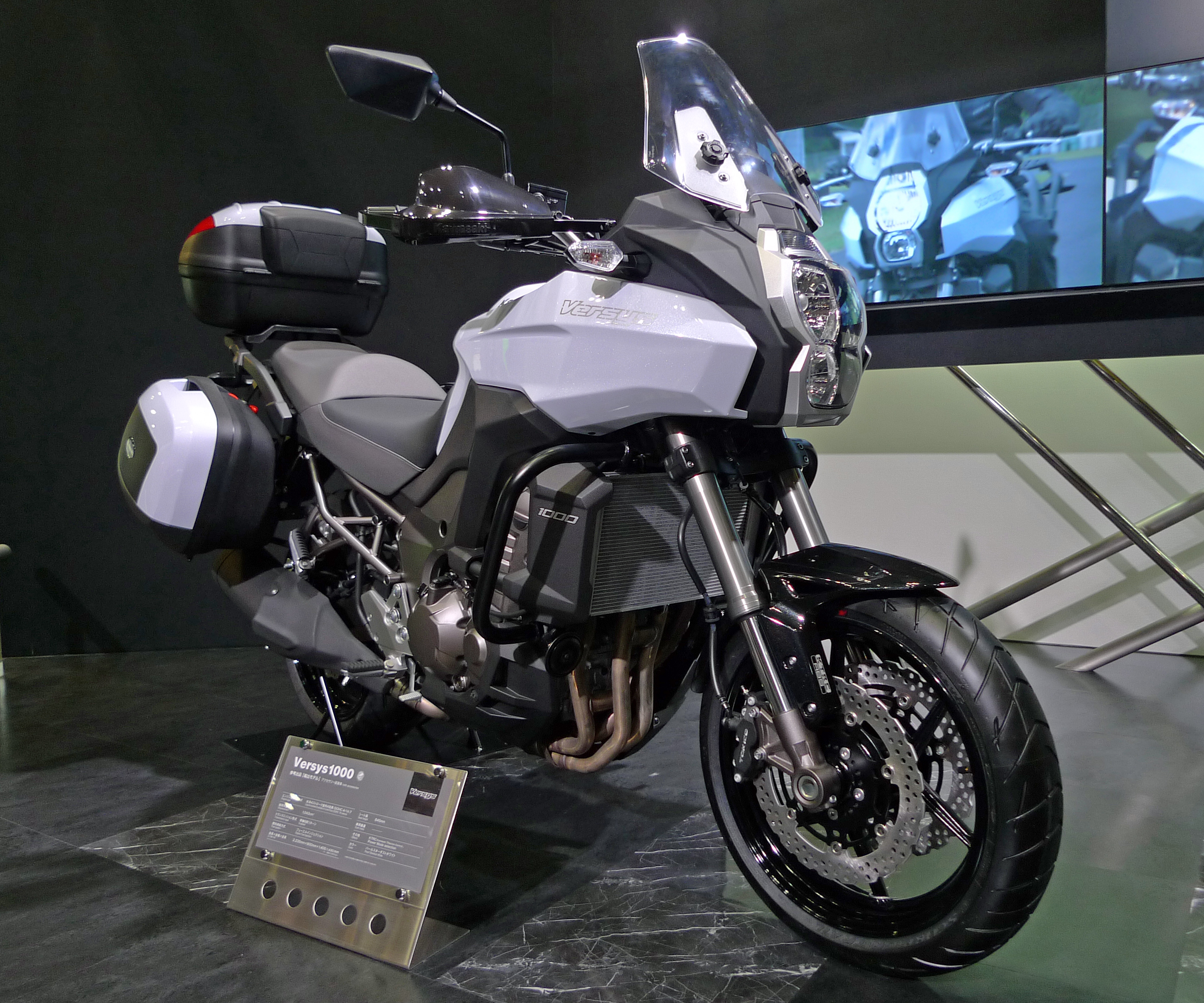
2012 Versys 1000

The first-generation model (2012) combined upright ergonomics and long-travel suspension with a retuned version of Kawasaki’s 1,043 cm^{3} four-cylinder engine. Factory figures listed 86.8 kW (118 hp) at 9,000 rpm and 102 N⋅m at 7,700 rpm, with a wheelbase of 1,520 mm.

A major refresh for the 2019 model year added electronic throttle valves and cruise control, updated bodywork with LED lighting, and (on higher-trim versions) a full IMU-based electronics suite.

=== Versys 1000 SE (2019- ) ===
From 2019 Kawasaki offered a higher-spec Versys 1000 SE featuring KECS (Kawasaki Electronic Control Suspension) semi-active damping, an IMU-linked rider-aid package (KCMF), quick shifter (KQS), TFT instruments with smartphone connectivity, and cornering lights.
