= Kawasaki Z750 =

2000s Japanese motorcycle

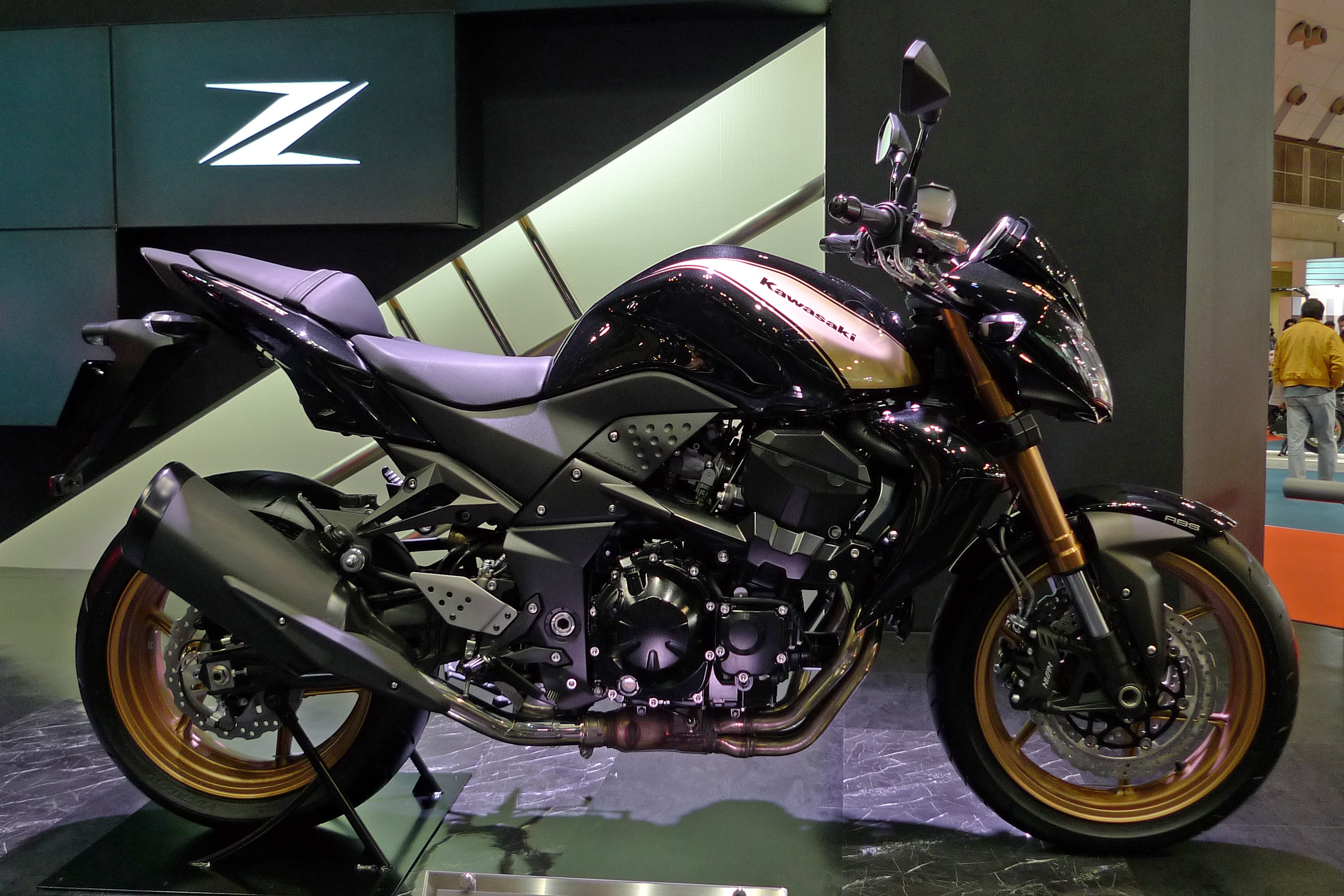
- Manufacturer: Kawasaki Motorcycle & Engine Company
- Parent company: Kawasaki Heavy Industries
- Production: 2004–2012
- Successor: Kawasaki Z800
- Class: Super Sports Tourer Adventure Bobber Cruiser
- Engine: 748 cc (45.6 cu in), liquid cooled, DOHC, inline four with digital fuel injection
- Bore / stroke: 63.4 mm × 50.9 mm (2.50 in × 2.00 in)
- Compression ratio: 11.3:1
- Power: 77.7 kW (104.2 hp; 105.6 PS) @ 10,500 rpm
- Torque: 78 N⋅m (58 lbf⋅ft) @ 8,300 rpm
- Transmission: 6-speed
- Related: Kawasaki Z1000

The Kawasaki Z750 is a 750 cc (46 cu in) inline-four engine standard motorcycle made by Kawasaki from 2004 to 2012. It is a smaller version of the Kawasaki Z1000.

The Kawasaki Z750 was launched in 2004 as an economy model, after its bigger brother, the Z1000 in 2003. It uses a 750 cc sleeved down version of the Z1000 engine, a cheaper front suspension and a conventional exhaust. Like the Z1000, which is considered a modern version of the Kawasaki Z900/Z1, the Z750 is considered a modern take on the Kawasaki Z750RS Z2. In 2007, Kawasaki launched a revised version of both the Z750 and the Z1000, with many stylistic and mechanical changes. In 2011, alongside the standard Z750, Kawasaki launched the Z750R, which has upgraded suspension and brakes components and a lightly revised styling.

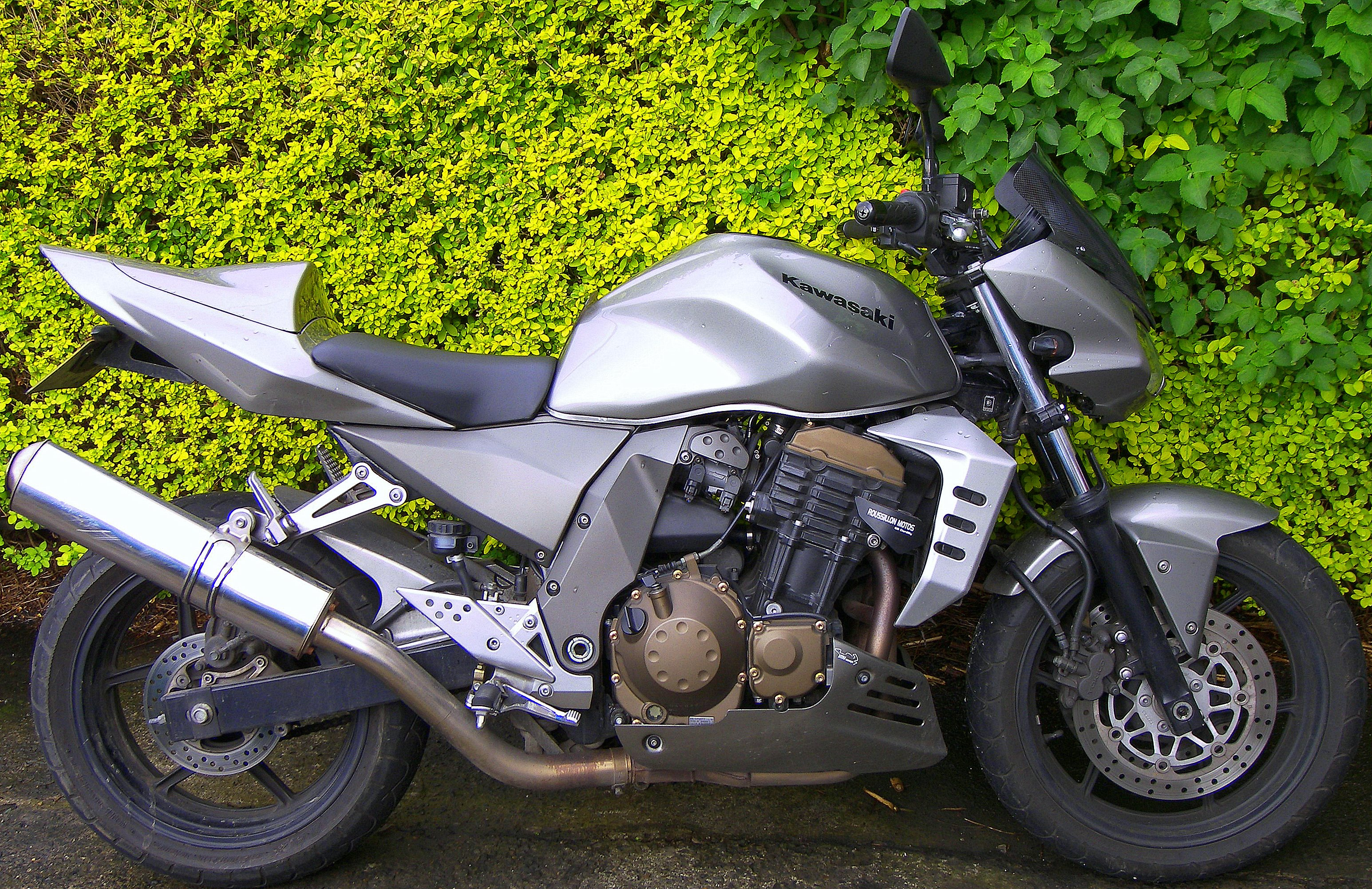
Modified Z750

== Variants and timeline ==
- In 2004, Kawasaki launched the first model of the Z750. This was considered as Kawasaki's new middle-weight conceived to rival the Honda Hornet, Yamaha FZ6 Fazer and Suzuki SV650, but with extra performance from the larger displacement engine. Kawasaki Europe's Kenji Nagahara stated: "Our strategy was to make a budget bike, but we wanted something different. Manufacturing a 750 isn't really any more expensive than building a 600. And with many parts common to the Z1000, we were able to offer the 750 at the right price. In essence, the 750 is a sleeved down Z1000 using some cheaper, lower-spec components.".
- In 2005, Kawasaki launched the Z750S, a touring variant. This version has a single long seat instead of the two-part seat on the Z750, half fairing for wind protection, and excludes the rear tire hugger fender found on the unfaired Z750. The S version uses an analog speedometer and tachometer taken from Kawasaki's super sport ZX-R models instead of the digital instrument cluster. Other differences include a slightly lower seat, grab rails and ZX10 style rear brake lights.

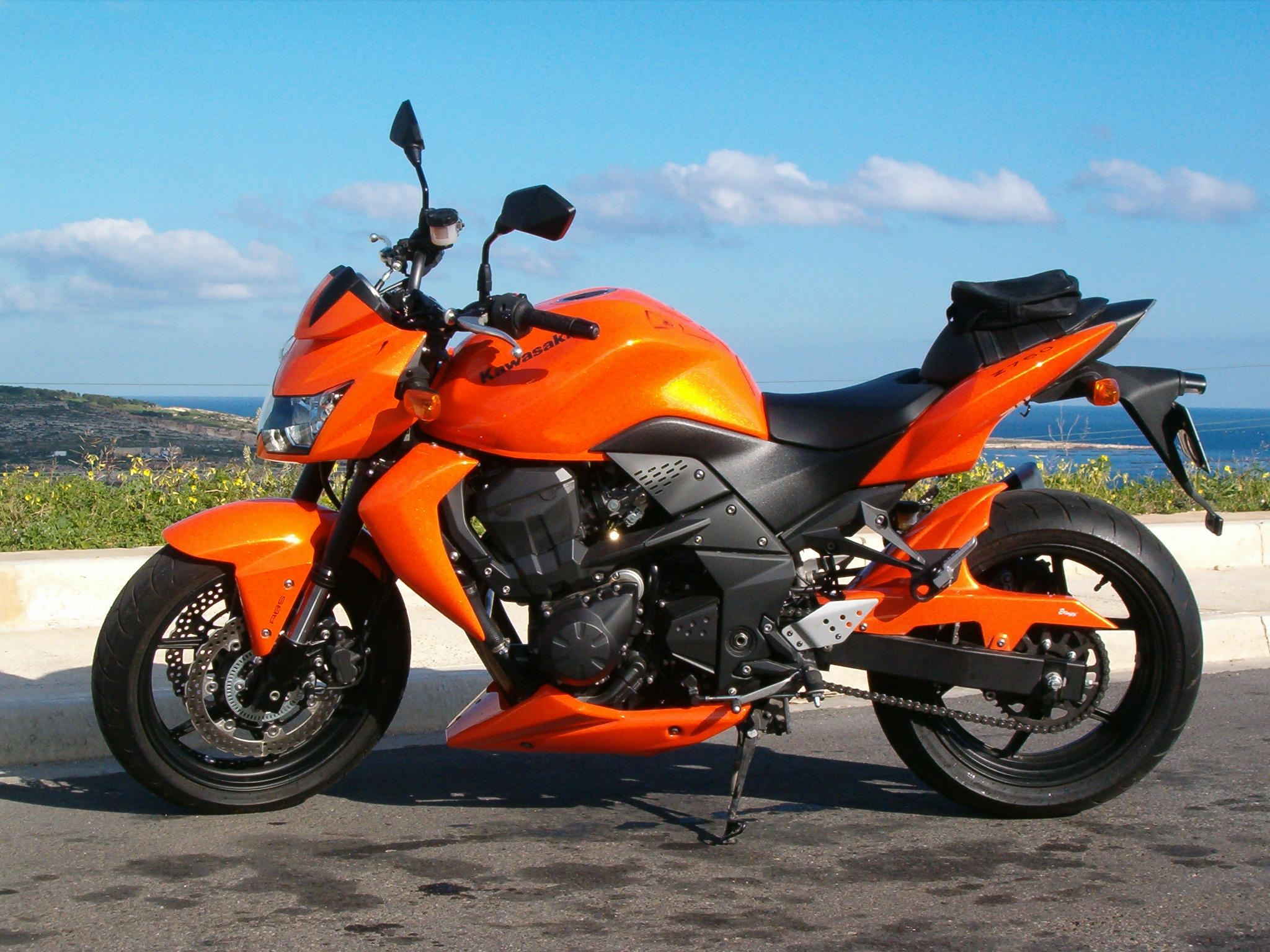
2008 Kawasaki Z750 ABS

- In 2007, Kawasaki launched a newer version of the Z750 with a bikini fairing. The engine has less vibration and is revised for more low-end torque. The front suspension is an upside down fork. The front and rear disk brakes use a petal design.
- In 2011, Kawasaki launched the Z750R alongside the standard Z750. This model resembles the 2007 to 2012 Z750, with upgraded front suspension, a rear suspension piggyback nitrogen reservoir, radial front brake calipers with metal-braided brake lines, an aluminum swingarm and black instrumentation. The headlight cluster, front mudguard and front and rear indicators were also redesigned for a sportier look.
- In 2012, Kawasaki introduces the Z800 which replaces the Z750. The Z800 has an increased bore size and body styling changes and was introduced to compete with the Yamaha FZ8.

== Specifications ==
Model Year	2004	2005	2006	2007	2008	2009	2010	2011 Z750 (Z750R)	2012 Z750 (Z750R)
Type	ZR750-J1			ZR750L/M					
Engine
Engine	748 cc (45.6 cu in), liquid-cooled, 4-stroke inline four								
Bore × stroke	68.4 mm × 50.9 mm (2.69 in × 2.00 in)								
Compression R\ratio	11.3:1								
Valve Train	DOHC, four valves per cylinder								
Carburetion	Digital fuel injection, Ø 34 mm × 4 Keihin throttle bodies			Digital fuel injection, Ø 32 mm × 4 Keihin throttle bodies with oval sub-throttles					
Ignition	Digital CDI								
Starting	Electric								
Lubrication	Forced lubrication, wet sump								
Drivetrain
Transmission	6-speed, return, manual with multi-plate clutch								
Final drive	Sealed chain								
Chassis/suspension/brakes
Frame	Diamond, high-tensile steel			Tubular backbone (with engine sub-frame), high-tensile steel					
Front suspension	41 mm telescopic fork non adjustable			41 mm upside down telescopic fork with rebound damping and spring preload adjustability Wheel travel : 120 mm					
Rear suspension	Bottom-Link Uni-Trak (adjustable preload and rebound)			Bottom-Link Uni-Trak with gas-charged shock Stepless 7-way (Bottom-Link Uni-Trak, gas-charged shock with piggypack reservoir, stepless rebound damping and stepless spring preload - Z750R); Wheel travel : 125 mm (134mm - Z750R)					
Front brakes	Dual semi-floating 300 mm discs with dual twin-piston caliper			Dual semi-floating 300 mm petal discs with dual twin-piston caliper (Dual semi-floating 300 mm petal discs with dual radial-mount opposed 4-piston caliper - Z750R)					
Rear brakes	Single 220 mm disc with single-piston calliper			Single 250 mm petal disc with single-piston calliper					
Front tire	120/70ZR17M/C (58W)								
Rear tire	180/55ZR17M/C (73W)								
Dimensions
Length	2,080 mm (82 in)			2,085 mm (82.1 in)					
Width	780 mm (31 in)			805 mm (31.7 in)					
Height	1,055 mm (41.5 in)			1,100 mm (43 in)					
Dry weight									
Wet weight									
Wheelbase	1,425 mm (56.1 in)			1,440 mm (57 in)					
Ground clearance	165 mm (6.5 in)			155 mm (6.1 in) (165 mm (6.5 in) - Z750R)					
Seat height	815 mm (32.1 in), (825 mm (32.5 in) - Z750R)								
Fuel capacity	19 L (4.2 imp gal; 5.0 US gal)			18.5 L (4.1 imp gal; 4.9 US gal)					
EU emission limit				EURO 3					
Rake				24.5°					
Trail				103 mm (4.1 in)					
Steering angle				31 degrees left, 31 degrees right					

== See also ==
- List of Kawasaki Z series machines from 1972
