= Kawasaki Z1000 =

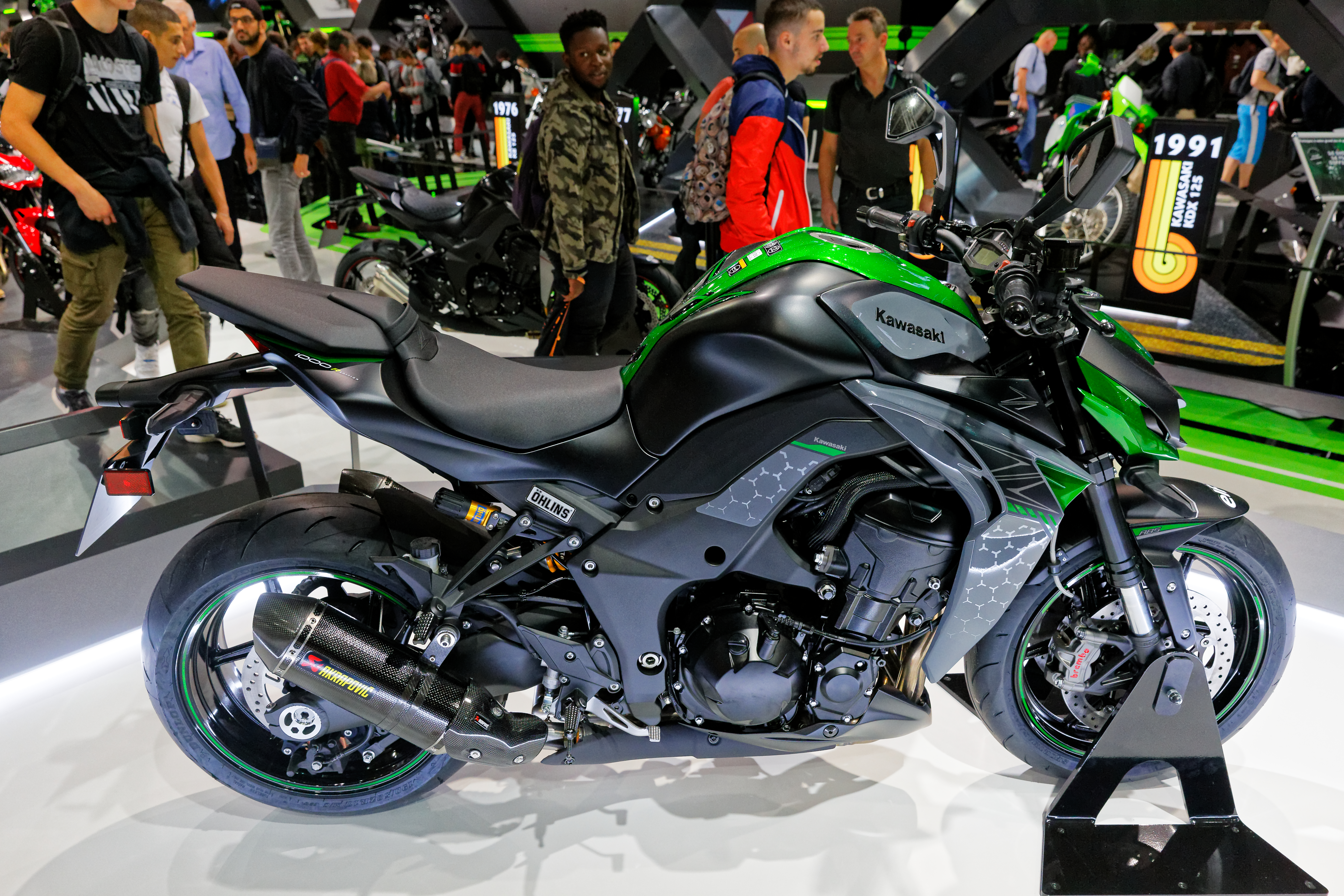
- Manufacturer: Kawasaki
- Parent company: Kawasaki Heavy Industries
- Production: 2003–2016
- Class: Streetfighter
- Engine: Liquid-cooled, DOHC, Transverse 4 cylinder , fuel injection
- Power: 104.4 kW (140.0 hp) @ 11,000 rpm
- Torque: 111 N⋅m (82 lbf⋅ft) @ 7,300 rpm
- Transmission: 6-speed
- Suspension: 41 mm inverted fork with stepless compression, rebound damping and spring preload adjustability
- Brakes: Dual disk 310mm at the front and single disc 250mm at the rear
- Tires: Front tyre 120/70ZR17M/C (58W), rear tyre 190/50ZR17M/C (73W)
- Weight: 198 kg (437 lb) (dry)
- Fuel capacity: 18.2 L (4.0 imp gal; 4.8 US gal)
- Related: Kawasaki Z series Kawasaki Ninja 1000

The Kawasaki Z1000 is a four-cylinder motorcycle introduced in 2003 with streetfighter or standard styling. The Z1000 was first introduced in 1977 superseding the previous 903 cc capacity Z1/Z900. Some countries like Australia and Thailand are still receiving current models of the Z1000 with Australia currently selling the new 2025 model.

== History ==
Kawasaki introduced the Z1 (900) motorcycle in 1972 as the first of the Kawasaki Z series, with four cylinders, dual overhead camshafts and 903 cc (55.1 cu in), followed by a 1015 cc version designated Z1000.

In 2003 Kawasaki introduced a completely revamped 30-year anniversary edition of the Z1000. It used a modified engine from the Kawasaki ZX-9R, and was bored out by 2.2 mm resulting in bigger displacement, more low-RPM torque, and only a slight power loss of 4 bhp from the original ZX9. In 2004, Kawasaki released the Z1000's smaller brother, the Z750. In 2007, Kawasaki released a new Z1000.

In October 2009, Kawasaki unveiled the 2010 Z1000. It had a new aluminum frame, digital instrument panel, bodywork, and engine. Bore and stroke are 77 × 56 mm, 1 mm more than the ZX-10R's 76 x 55 mm displacing 1,043 cc. That is up from the previous model's 953 cc. Compression ratio is 11.8:1, and fuel injection is handled by a bank of 38-mm Keihin throttle bodies.

== 2003–2006 models ==
Stylistically, the 2003 Z1000 was a departure from other naked sportbikes of the time. The Z1000 used the same tail section that was being used on the 2003 ZX6R 636 cc sport bike.

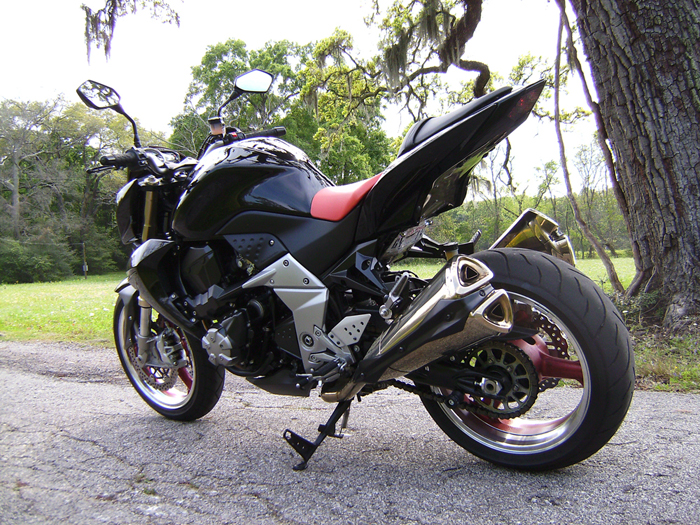
2007 Kawasaki Z1000

It has a 4-2-4 exhaust system. The Z1000 uses a backbone frame that supports the engine as a stressed member. Engine mounts can be removed to ease access for maintenance. Compression damping is done on one fork leg, rebound damping on the other. This technology is from dirt bikes, and is rare on street motorcycles. The Nissin brakes have four piston calipers.

== 2007–2009 models ==
In 2007 Kawasaki released an updated version of the Z1000. The bike features a detuned version of the ZX-9R engine. This detuning, in addition to the design of the exhaust, provides less top end compared to the super-sport ZX-9R engine, but more low to mid rpm range.

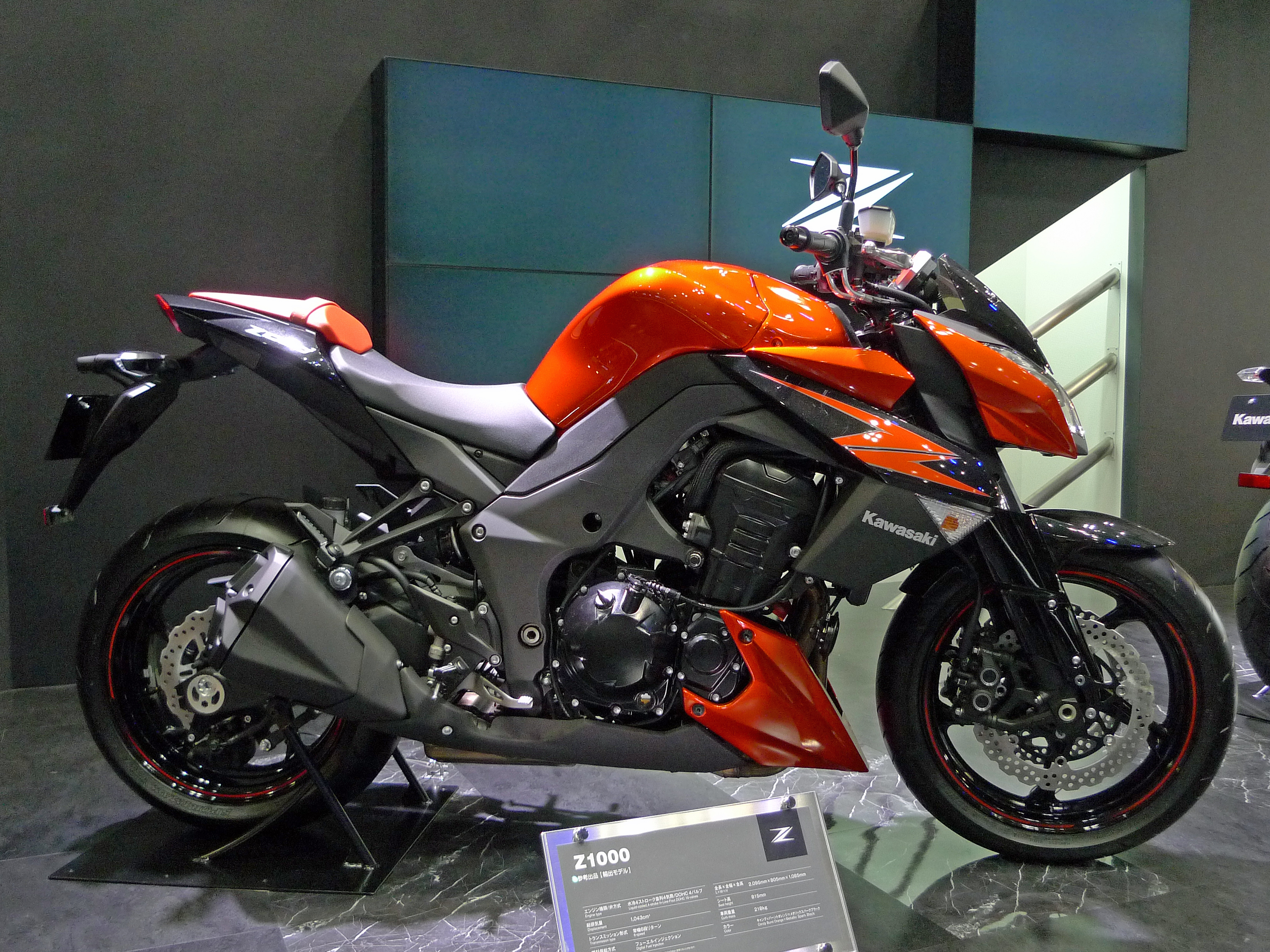
Kawasaki Z1000 at 2011 Tokyo Motor Show

== 2010–2013 models ==
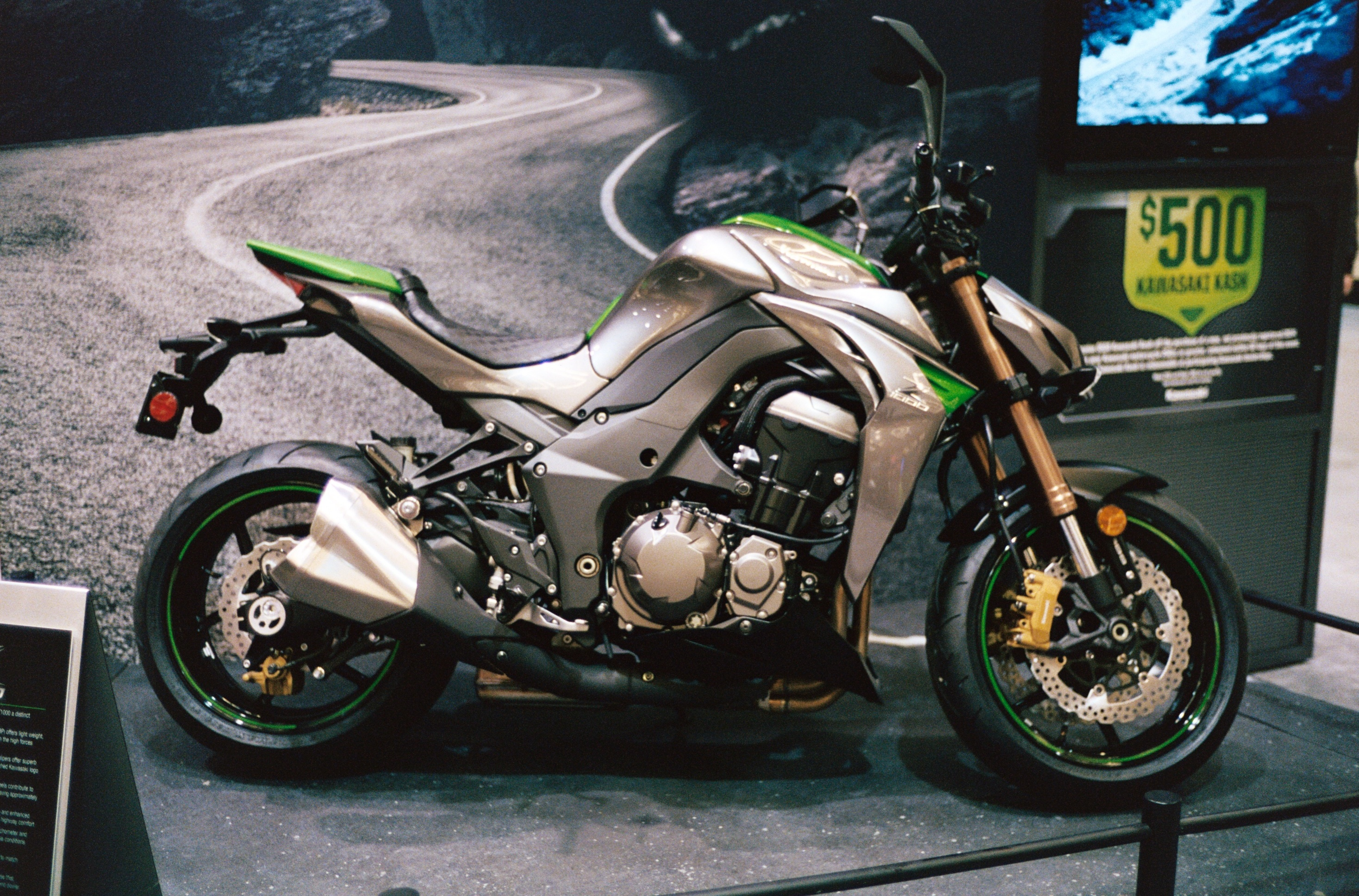
2014 Z1000 at the Seattle International Motorcycle Show

The Z1000 was redesigned for 2010. Along with the customary styling update came a slightly larger capacity engine. The motorcycle was officially marketed as the "Z1000 ABS", as ABS came fitted as standard.

In 2013 Kawasaki broke with the 3-year update cycle and choose to release a "special edition" – alongside the standard edition – to mark the 40th anniversary of the Z brand. The differences between the models were purely aesthetic.

== 2014–2016 models ==
The Z1000 was restyled and updated for 2014, making slightly more power; and front brake caliper are 4-piston monoblock. Also a big piston Showa separate function fork along with lighter wheels and a slightly larger gas tank.

== Specifications ==
	2003–2006	2007–2009	2010–2013	2014–2016
Engine type	Four-stroke, liquid-cooled, DOHC, four-cylinder, 16-valve			
Displacement	953 cc (58.2 cu in)		1,043 cc (63.6 cu in)	
Bore & stroke	77.2 mm × 50.9 mm (3.04 in × 2.00 in)		77.0 mm × 56.0 mm (3.03 in × 2.20 in)	
Top speed		155 mph (249 km/h)	149.3 mph (240.3 km/h)	
Maximum torque	95.6 N⋅m (70.5 lbf⋅ft) @ 8,000 rpm(claimed)	98.7 N⋅m (72.8 lbf⋅ft) @ 8,200 rpm(claimed); 66.6 lb⋅ft (90.3 N⋅m) (rear wheel)	110 N⋅m (81 lbf⋅ft) @ 7,800 rpm(claimed)	111.0 N⋅m (81.9 lbf⋅ft) @ 7,300 rpm(claimed)); 74.9 lb⋅ft (101.6 N⋅m) (rear wheel)
Maximum power	93.4 kW (125.3 hp) @ 10,000 rpm	92 kW (123 hp) @ 10,000 rpm 108.8 hp (81.1 kW) (rear wheel)	101.5 kW (136.1 hp) @ 9,600 rpm	104.5 kW (140.1 hp) @ 10,000 rpm 125.8 hp (93.8 kW) (rear wheel)
Compression ratio	11.2:1		11.8:1	
Fuel injection	38 mm diameter × 4		38 mm diameter × 4	
Ignition	Battery and coil			
Transmission	6-speed, constant mesh, return shift			
Clutch	Wet, multi disc			
Final drive	Chain			
Frame type	Diamond, high-tensile steel	Backbone, high-tensile steel tubes and cast aluminum engine sub-frame	Twin-tube, aluminium	
Rake / trail	24° / 101 mm (4.0 in)	24.5° / 103 mm (4.1 in)		
Front suspension / wheel travel	41 mm inverted cartridge fork with stepless rebound damping and adjustable spring preload / 4.7 in (120 mm)			Showa fully adjustable separate-function SFF-BP fork
Rear suspension / wheel travel	Bottom-link Uni-Trak with gas-charged shock, stepless rebound damping and adjustable spring preload / 5.9 in (150 mm)			
Front tire size	120/70 ZR17			
Rear tire size	190/50 ZR17			
Wheelbase	1,420 mm (56 in)	1,445 mm (56.9 in)	1,440 mm (57 in)	1,435 mm (56.5 in)
Front brake type	Dual disc	Dual disc petal rotors		four-piston monoblock front brake calipers
Rear brake type	Single disc	Single disc petal rotor		
Fuel tank capacity	19 L (4.2 imp gal; 5.0 US gal)	18.5 L (4.1 imp gal; 4.9 US gal)	15 L (3.3 imp gal; 4.0 US gal)	17 L (3.7 imp gal; 4.5 US gal)
Curb weight	221 kg (487 lb)	228 kg (503 lb)	218 kg (481 lb)	220 kg (490 lb)
Seat height	820 mm (32 in)			815.34 mm (32.100 in)
Overall length	2,080 mm (82 in)	2,090 mm (82 in)	2,095 mm (82.5 in)	2,044.7 mm (80.50 in)
Overall width	770 mm (30 in)	780 mm (31 in)	805 mm (31.7 in)	789.94 mm (31.100 in)
Overall height	1,055 mm (41.5 in)	1,065 mm (41.9 in)	1,085 mm (42.7 in)	1,054.1 mm (41.50 in)
Road clearance	145 mm (5.7 in)	160 mm (6.3 in)	140 mm (5.5 in)	

== See also ==
- Kawasaki Z series
