= Kawasaki GPZ series =

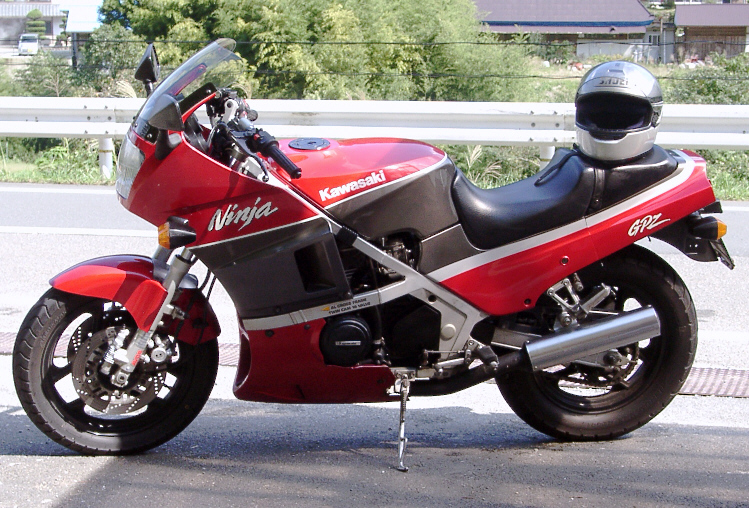
Kawasaki GPZ400R

Kawasaki GPZ or GPz refers to a series of motorcycles produced by Kawasaki Heavy Industries Motorcycle & Engine.

Summary of Kawasaki GPZ Motorcycles
Years	Make	Model
1983–1987	Kawasaki	GPZ250
1983–1994	Kawasaki	GPZ305
1985-1990	Kawasaki	GPZ400R
1987–2009	Kawasaki	GPZ500S
1981–1985	Kawasaki	GPZ550
1985–1997	Kawasaki	GPZ600R
1982–1985	Kawasaki	GPZ750
1983–1985	Kawasaki	GPZ750 Turbo
1985–1987	Kawasaki	GPZ750R
1983–1996	Kawasaki	GPZ900R
1986–1988	Kawasaki	GPZ1000RX
1981–1985	Kawasaki	GPZ1100
1981–1982	Kawasaki	GPZ1100 B1/B2
1982	Kawasaki	GPZ ZX1100 A-1
1995–1998	Kawasaki	GPZ1100 Sport Touring

== See also ==
- Kawasaki GTR1000 "Concours" (1986–2006, same Motor as the GPZ1000RX)
- Kawasaki Eliminator "ZL900" & "ZL1000" (1985–1988, same Motor as the Kawasaki GPZ900R/GPZ1000RX)
- Kawasaki Z series (naked predecessor series)
- Kawasaki Ninja series
- List of Kawasaki motorcycles
- Kawasaki motorcycles
