= Kawasaki GPZ1100ABS =

GPZ 1100
- Manufacturer: Kawasaki Heavy Industries Motorcycle & Engine
- Also called: Horizont/ABS
- Parent company: Kawasaki Heavy Industries
- Production: 1995-1998
- Predecessor: GPZ1100 (1981 – 1985)
- Class: Sport Touring
- Engine: 1,152 cc (70.3 cu in) inline four
- Bore / stroke: 76.0 mm × 58.0 mm (2.99 in × 2.28 in)
- Top speed: 249 km/h (155 mph)
- Power: 92 kW (123 hp); 110 hp (82 kW) (rear wheel)
- Torque: 100 N⋅m (74 lb⋅ft)
- Wheelbase: 1,510 mm (59.6 in)
- Seat height: 790 mm (31.1 in)
- Weight: 242.03 kg (534 lb) (dry); 590 lb (270 kg) (wet)
- Fuel capacity: 21.95 L (4.83 imp gal; 5.80 US gal)

The Kawasaki GPZ1100ABS motorcycle, also labeled GPZ 1100 Horizont, was introduced in 1995. It was a sport touring motorcycle with more focus on touring than sports. Based on a ZZR-1100 motor without the ram air and detuned for more mid-range performance, it also had smaller carburetors and a more restrictive exhaust. The bike was more focused on being economical with budget brakes and suspension. Instead of the Ninjas ZX-11's alloy frame, the bike had a steel double cradle frame with a removable front member for engine removal. The motorcycle had a more relaxed seating position and leg position than the ZX-11D/ZZR-1100 or the air-cooled GPZ1100 of the early 1980s .The official Kawasaki designation was ZX1100E. It also was offered in 1996 as an ABS model.

== See also ==
- Kawasaki GPZ1100 (1981 – 1985)
- Kawasaki GPZ1100 B1/B2 (1981 – 1982)
- Kawasaki GPZ series
