= Kawasaki Eliminator =

Eliminator
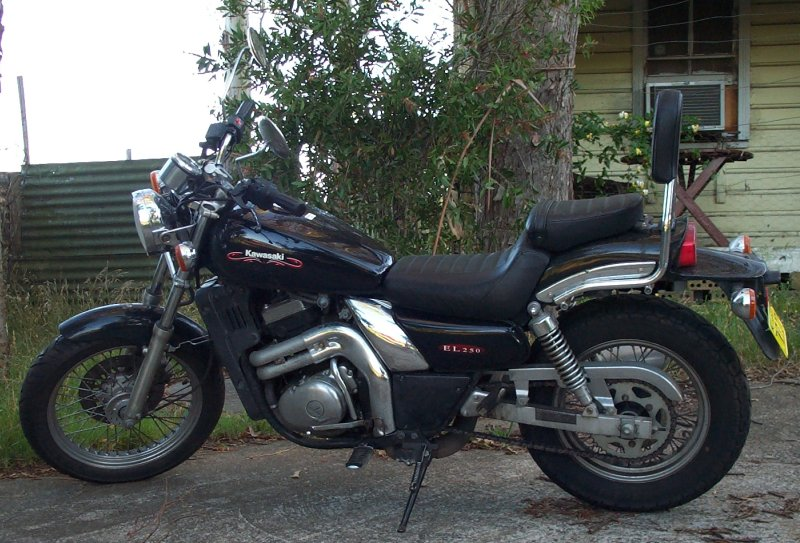
- Manufacturer: Kawasaki Motors
- Parent company: Kawasaki Heavy Industries
- Production: 1985–2007, 2023–present
- Class: Cruiser
- Engine: 900cc Inline-4

The Eliminator name was first used by Kawasaki in 1985 on the ZL900 A1 motorcycle, creating one of the first "sport cruisers" by using a sport bike engine in a cruiser frame. Since then, the name has been used on a variety of models ranging from 124 cc to 997 cc in engine displacement.

== Models ==
=== ZL900 ===
Introduced in 1985 and only produced for 2 years, the ZL900 Eliminator used the 908 cc inline-four cylinder engine from the Kawasaki GPZ900R in a cruiser frame. Kawasaki used smaller 32 mm carburetors (the GPZ900R used 34 mm), different timing, and camshafts with less duration. This gave the engine a different personality, trading high-end power for low- and mid-range performance that was more suitable for a cruiser. The ZL900 (known as the ZL900 A1 for 1985 and the ZL900 A2 for 1986) was designed to evoke images of the wildly successful Z1 drag bikes, with a bobbed rear fender, short travel fork, large rear tire, fat chromed mufflers, small fuel tank, and low straight handlebars. At the time, the ZL900 was the only bike in its segment using an inline-four powerplant instead of a V4 configuration. These bikes were produced by Kawasaki in Lincoln, Nebraska for the American market.

=== ZL1000 ===
The ZL1000 was an evolution of the ZL900, sporting a larger engine shared with the ZG1000 Concours and 34 mm carburetors. The styling of the ZL1000 was much more conservative than that of the 900, with a longer rear fender and a much larger fuel tank, the 2,500 models of this motorcycle were only available for, 1987 and 1988, but only sold in UK, Australia and the US in 1987. 100 HP models were sold in Germany, France, and Sweden. The ZL1000 shares the same strong following as the ZL900.

=== ZL750 ===
The ZL750 was sold from 1986 to 1989 as a mild-mannered version of its big brothers.

=== ZL600 ===
The ZL600 produced from 1986 to 1997 had the same type of transplant as its bigger siblings: a slightly modified engine from the Kawasaki Ninja 600.

=== ZL400 ===
The ZL400 began production in 1986, and ceased production in 1994. It uses the powertrain from the GPZ400R, with similar respective modifications to the ZL900. Like the larger models, all versions of the ZL400 had a shaft drive.

=== VN250 ===
This model started production in 1998.

=== EL250 (D5) ===
The EL250 had a production run from 1988 to 1997, at which point it was superseded by the VN250.

=== EL175 ===
The EL175 was manufactured and sold as the Kawasaki Bajaj Eliminator in India by Bajaj Auto in collaboration with Kawasaki. The export model is called BN175 and is powered by a 175cc, air-cooled, four-stroke engine.

=== EL125 ===
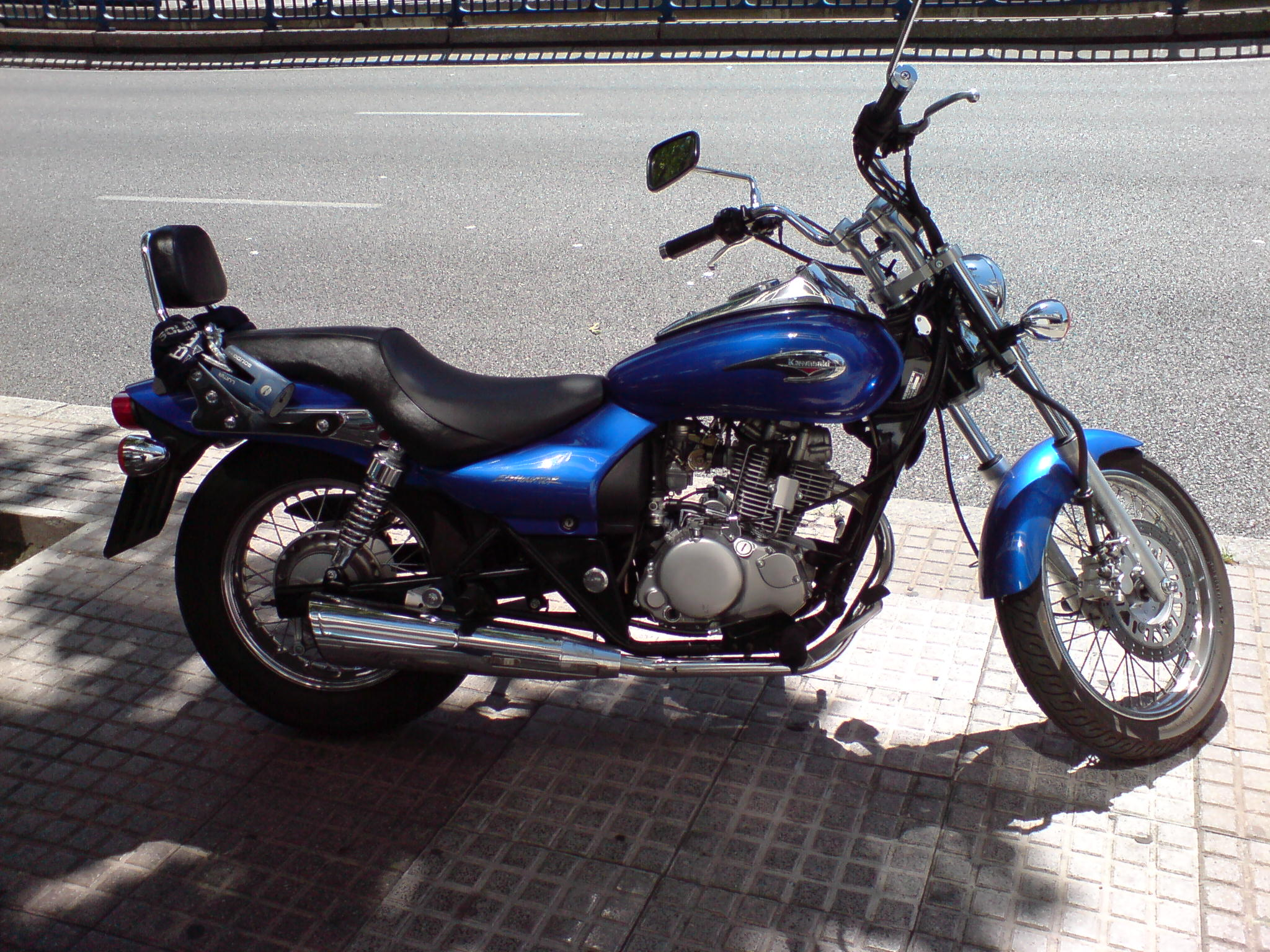
Eliminator 125

The Eliminator 125 is Kawasaki's entry-level cruiser. The Motorcycle Safety Foundation uses this bike in their beginner riders courses. It is powered by a 125 cc, air-cooled, four-stroke, single-cylinder engine. It is sometimes called the BN125 and was discontinued in the UK in mid-2007.

=== Eliminator 400/500 ===
In 2023, Kawasaki reintroduced the Eliminator at the Osaka Motorcycle Show. The motorcycle initially shown was powered by a 398 cc parallel-twin derived from the Ninja 400/Z400. While this model went on to be sold in Japan, the Eliminator 500 debuted soon after. The 451 cc parallel-twin in the Eliminator 500 is mechanically similar to the 398cc in the Eliminator 400, with an increased stroke. This 451 cc went on to be shared with the Ninja 500 and Z500 motorcycles. The Eliminator 500 is sold in the US, Europe, and other markets.
