= GPZ =

GPZ may refer to:

- Gladys Porter Zoo, in Brownsville, Texas
- Grand Rapids–Itasca County Airport, in Minnesota
- Kawasaki GPZ series, a series of motorcycle
- Google Project Zero, a team of Google security analysts tasked with finding zero-day vulnerabilities
