= Kawasaki GPZ750 =

Kawasaki GPz750 (ZX750A1-3)
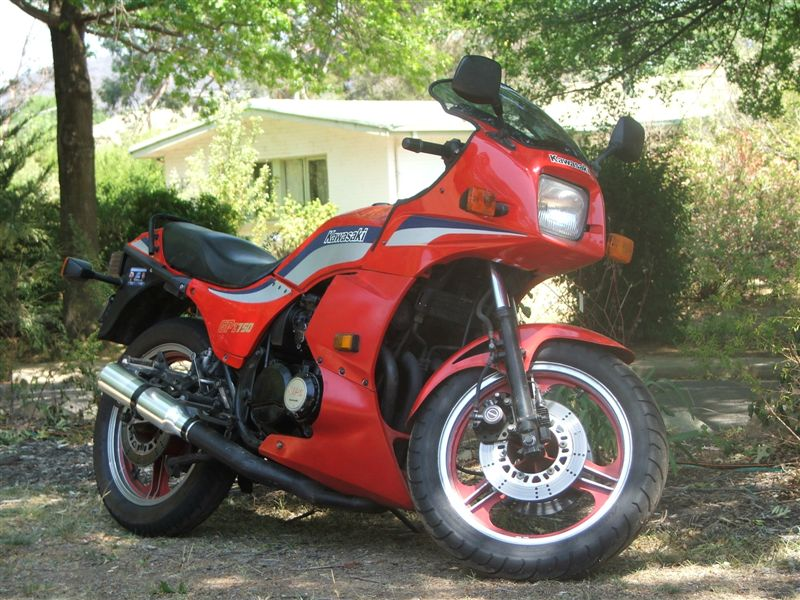
- 1984 GPz 750 with 1985 lower fairings
- Manufacturer: Kawasaki
- Also called: ZX750A1-3, GPz750
- Parent company: Kawasaki Heavy Industries
- Production: 1982–1985
- Predecessor: Kawasaki KZ750-R1, Z750 (non-US)
- Successor: GPZ750R (Liquid-cooled version)
- Class: Sport bike
- Engine: 738 cc (45.0 cu in), 4-stroke, transverse 4-cylinder, air-cooled, DOHC, 2 valve per cylinder
- Bore / stroke: 66 mm × 54 mm (2.6 in × 2.1 in)
- Power: 60 kW (80 bhp) @ 9,500 rpm (claimed)
- Torque: 65.8 N⋅m (48.5 lb⋅ft) 7,500 rpm (claimed)
- Ignition type: Electronic
- Transmission: 5-speed
- Frame type: Steel
- Suspension: Front: telescoping fork Rear: aluminum swingarm, dual shock (1982) Uni-Trak (1983– )
- Brakes: Front: dual disc Rear: single disc
- Tires: Tubeless, front: 110/80-18; Rear: 130/80-18
- Rake, trail: 28°, 100 mm (4.1 in)
- Wheelbase: 1,500 mm (59 in)
- Dimensions: L: 2,185 mm (86.0 in); W: 775 mm (30.5 in); H: 1,215 mm (47.8 in)
- Seat height: 780 mm (31 in)
- Weight: 230 kg (506 lb) (1/2 tank) (wet)
- Fuel capacity: 22 L (4.8 imp gal; 5.8 US gal)
- Related: Kawasaki GPZ750 Turbo, Kawasaki Z750

The Kawasaki GPz750 was a sport bike introduced by Kawasaki in 1982. In comparison with the KZ750, it had many updates focusing on high performance.

Changes started at the front, with tapered bearings in the steering head instead of the KZ750's ball bearings, and the upper triple clamp was changed also, giving the GPz solid aluminum clip-on handle grips instead of the traditional handlebar. A bikini fairing almost identical to the one on the GPz550 was added too. The GPz750 had increased power, with slightly higher compression, and camshafts designed to get the valves to full lift quicker, and fitting Mikuni 34mm carburetors for smoother airflow. The cylinder heads were also given a new combustion chamber, and porting and polishing from the factory. An oil-cooler was also added. The GPz750 was the quickest factory 750, as Cycle World recorded a time of 11.93 seconds at 109.62 mph (176.42 km/h) in the 1/4 mile. The GPz750 underwent some significant changes in 1983. The original was based on the 1981 KZ750-E. Kawasaki retired the KZ750 after 1983. The 1983 KZ750L3 was nearly identical to the '82 GPz750, but for different colors, no bikini fairing, and without the porting & polishing in the cylinder head.

In 1983, the engine was modified further, mostly in the combustion chamber, and an all-new frame was used with Uni-Trak suspension. There were also modifications to the suspension, brakes and wheels, as well as the bodywork. The bike became more sport-oriented, but lost some of the versatility of the '82.

== Basic Shapes (1982-1985) ==
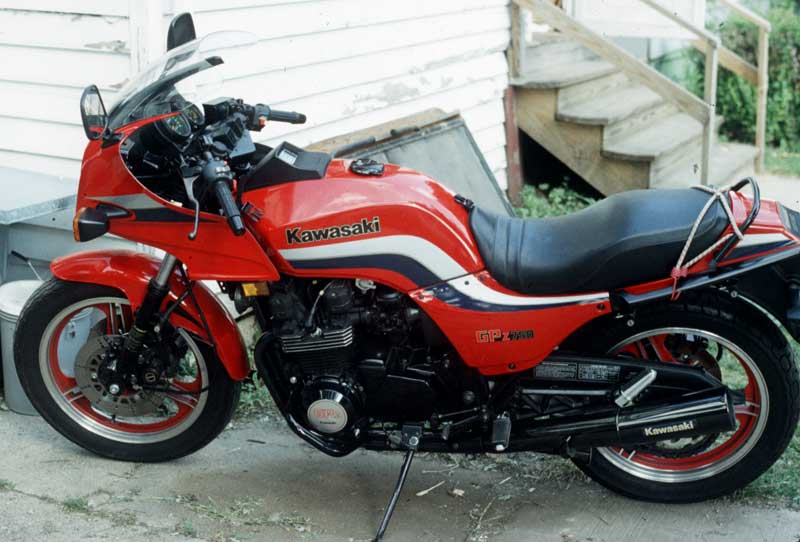
GPz750 without lower fairings

- 1982 - First Year of Manufacture. Bikini Style Headlight Only
- 1983 and 1984 - Second and third years of manufacture. Full sized upper fairing (half-faired version).
- 1983 model had clip ons and no cover for the fairing internals.
- 1984 model had taller handlebar mounts for a more upright seating position. Also had a plastic cover inside the fairing to block headlight scatter and to conceal wiring.
- 1985 - US model was sold in black only, had seating position identical to 1984 model, and included fairing lowers with a E-model style front fender.

== MSRP/List prices ==
The 1983 MSRP was $5,599 (US).

== GPZ750R ==
In 1986, Kawasaki issued the new GPZ750R (ZX750R), which in many parts was an identical twin of the GPZ900R "Ninja" (presented 1983), just with smaller bore in the same motor.

== See also ==
- Kawasaki GPZ series
