= Kawasaki GPZ750 Turbo =

Kawasaki motorcycle

Kawasaki 750 Turbo
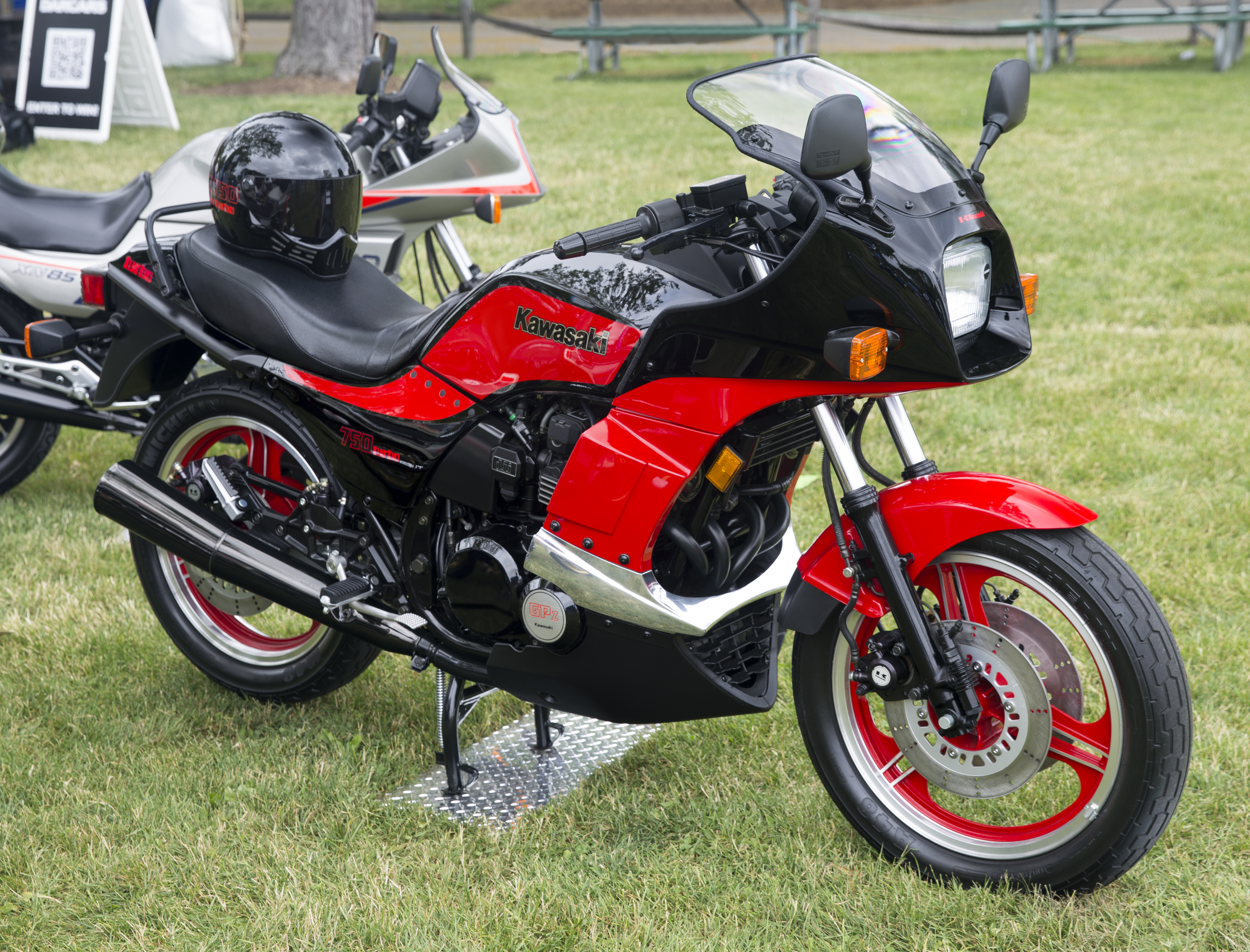
- Manufacturer: Kawasaki
- Also called: ZX750E, GPzx1 750T or 750 Turbo
- Production: 1983–1985
- Predecessor: Kawasaki KZ750-R1
- Class: Sport bike
- Engine: 738 cc, 4-stroke, transverse 4-cylinder, air-cooled, DOHC, 2-valves per cylinder
- Bore / stroke: 66 mm × 54 mm (2.6 in × 2.1 in)
- Power: 112 hp (84 kW) @ 8,500 rpm (1983 model)
- Torque: 73.1 lb⋅ft (99.1 N⋅m) @ 6,500 rpm
- Ignition type: Electronic
- Transmission: 5-speed
- Frame type: steel
- Suspension: Front - Telescopic forks with antidive units Rear - Uni-Trac rear suspension with aluminum swingarm
- Brakes: Dual disc (front); Single disc (rear)
- Tires: Tubeless; 110/90-18 (front); 130/90-18 (rear)
- Wheelbase: 1,490 mm (59 in)
- Dimensions: L: 2,220 mm (87 in); W: 740 mm (29 in)
- Seat height: 780 mm (31 in)
- Weight: 223 kg (492 lb) (dry); 241 kg (531 lb) (wet)
- Fuel capacity: 18 L (4.0 imp gal; 4.8 US gal)
- Related: GPz750

The Kawasaki GPz750 Turbo was a sportbike manufactured from late 1983 to 1985, with two model years – the 1984 E1 and the 1985 E2. Differences were minor, a twin "push/pull" throttle cable for the E2 and different brake caliper stickers. The bike was manufactured in Japan, with parts also shipped to the US and assembled in Kawasaki's Nebraska plant for the US/Canada market to bypass the import tax levied on bikes over 700cc at the time by the US government, a protectionist move designed to save Harley-Davidson which was having financial problems at the time.

Although carrying GPz badges on the engine covers, it was only referred to by Kawasaki as the "750 Turbo"——the GPz tag was not mentioned. It is also referred to as the ZX750E. Development started in January 1981 as a turbocharged 650, then as a 750 from November 1981. When finally released, the stock bike made a claimed 112 hp (84 kW), had sports bike handling (for the day) and looked good – especially next to the other factory turbo bikes which were already on the market such as the Suzuki XN85, Honda CX500 and CX650 turbos, and the Yamaha Seca Turbo. Performance was on a par with the GPz1100, at around 11.2 seconds at 125 mph (201 km/h) for the quarter mile and 148 mph (238 km/h) flat out. One magazine even branded it the fastest bike they had ever tested, and Kawasaki ran some ads claiming it to be "The World's Fastest Production Turbo Charged Bike". Jay "PeeWee" Gleason also recorded a 10.71 second quarter mile for Kawasaki to show that the turbo had genuine performance and was ahead of the other factory turbos. It is widely considered to be the "best" factory turbo produced by the Japanese manufacturers.

To build the turbo, Kawasaki did more than simply add fuel injection and a turbocharger to the standard GPz750 motorcycle engine. Some parts are exclusive to the "turbo", such as low-compression (7.8:1) pistons, stronger gearbox internals, a modified oil pan with an extra oil scavenge pump, a boost indicator, the characteristic aluminium "turbo"-spoiler, and a different Unitrak linkage (which gave it a firmer ride). The exhaust system and turbo (except silencers) were strengthened with different tube material, and some dimensions and frame geometry differed (28° rake instead of 26°). The rest came from conventionally aspirated 750 and the 1100 (front fork, brakes and some injection parts) and the entire cylinder head assembly from the KZ 650. The GPz Turbo used a Hitachi HT-10B turbocharger, positioned close to the headers, and electronic fuel injection.
