= Kawasaki GPZ305 =

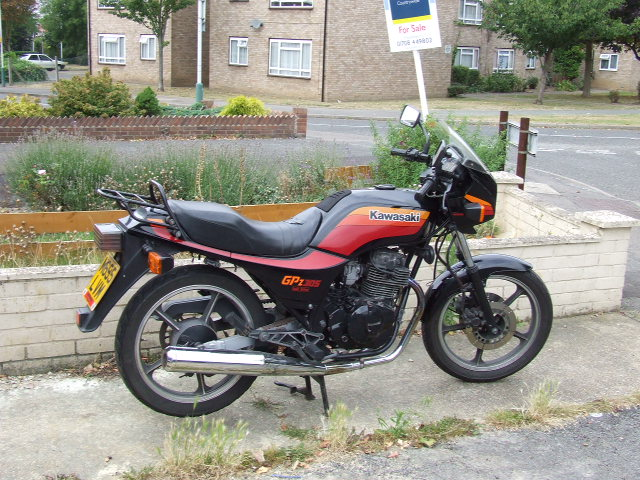
- Manufacturer: Kawasaki
- Production: 1983–1994
- Predecessor: Kawasaki KZ305
- Class: Sport bike
- Engine: 306 cc (18.7 cu in) SOHC four stroke parallel twin
- Bore / stroke: 61 mm × 52.4 mm (2.40 in × 2.06 in)
- Compression ratio: 9.7:1
- Top speed: 158 km/h (98 mph)
- Power: 26 kW (35 bhp) @ 10,000 rpm (claimed)
- Torque: 25.5 N⋅m (18.8 lb⋅ft) @ 8,500 rpm (claimed)
- Ignition type: Magneto CDI
- Transmission: Wet clutch, 6-speed, belt drive
- Suspension: Front: telescopic fork 150 mm (5.9 in) travel Rear: swingarm 130 mm (5.1 in) travel
- Brakes: Front: 260 mm (10.2 in) disc Rear: 160 mm (6.3 in) drum
- Tires: Front: 90/90-18 Dunlop F8; Rear: 110/90-18 Dunlop K130
- Rake, trail: 26.5°, 94 mm (3.7 in)
- Wheelbase: 1,355 mm (53.3 in)
- Dimensions: L: 2,130 mm (84 in); W: 745 mm (29.3 in); H: 1,185 mm (46.7 in)
- Seat height: 780 mm (30.8 in)
- Weight: 160.64 kg (354.15 lb) (wet)
- Fuel capacity: 16.5 L (3.6 imp gal; 4.4 US gal)
- Oil capacity: 1,800 ml (1.9 US qt)
- Fuel consumption: 3.0 L/100 km; 95 mpg_{‑imp} (79 mpg_{‑US})

The Kawasaki GPZ305 was a 306 cc (18.7 cu in) twin cylinder air-cooled SOHC four-stroke motorcycle, produced in 1983 to 1994 by Kawasaki in Japan.

== History ==
The model evolved from the earlier ER250 model and used an overbored 61 mm × 52.4 mm (2.40 in × 2.06 in) version of the 249 cc engine first produced in 1979. Kawasaki gave this model the "Gpz" nomenclature to add to its expanding air-cooled sports bike range, and was marketed as a sports machine. It originally had chain final drive but in 1983 it had a new Kevlar belt final drive first seen on Kawasaki's American styled cruisers.

It was available with a 250 cc engine as the Kawasaki Scorpion, but came in a different colour scheme.

In Cycle World's "Ten Best Bikes of 1983", the Gpz305 won best "Under 460 cc Street" motorcycle, because it was the "best of the lightweight roadsters", combining small bike advantages of low weight and low cost with the fun of a sport bike. In their review, Cycle World praised the bike's quick handling in comparison with heavier, more powerful motorcycles, saying that the while 1,100 and 750 cc (67 and 46 cu in) displacement bikes have a much greater engine power advantage, they typically have 60 in (1,500 mm) wheelbases, giving the 55.2 in (1,400 mm) wheelbase Gpz305 an advantage in the ease that it leans into a turn. They also said that while large engines have the advantage of having a wide power band and do not need frequent shifting during casual riding, the Gpz305's lack of power below 7,000 rpm forces the rider to shift frequently to get the most out of the bike, making it more fun to ride. The review said the Gpz305's air-fuel ratio was excessively lean in order to meet EPA emissions requirements, which meant the bike took 10 mi (16 km) of riding to warm up enough to run smoothly without using the choke, and that the bike benefited greatly from re-jetting the carburetor, without losing fuel economy in the process.
