= Kawasaki ER-5 =

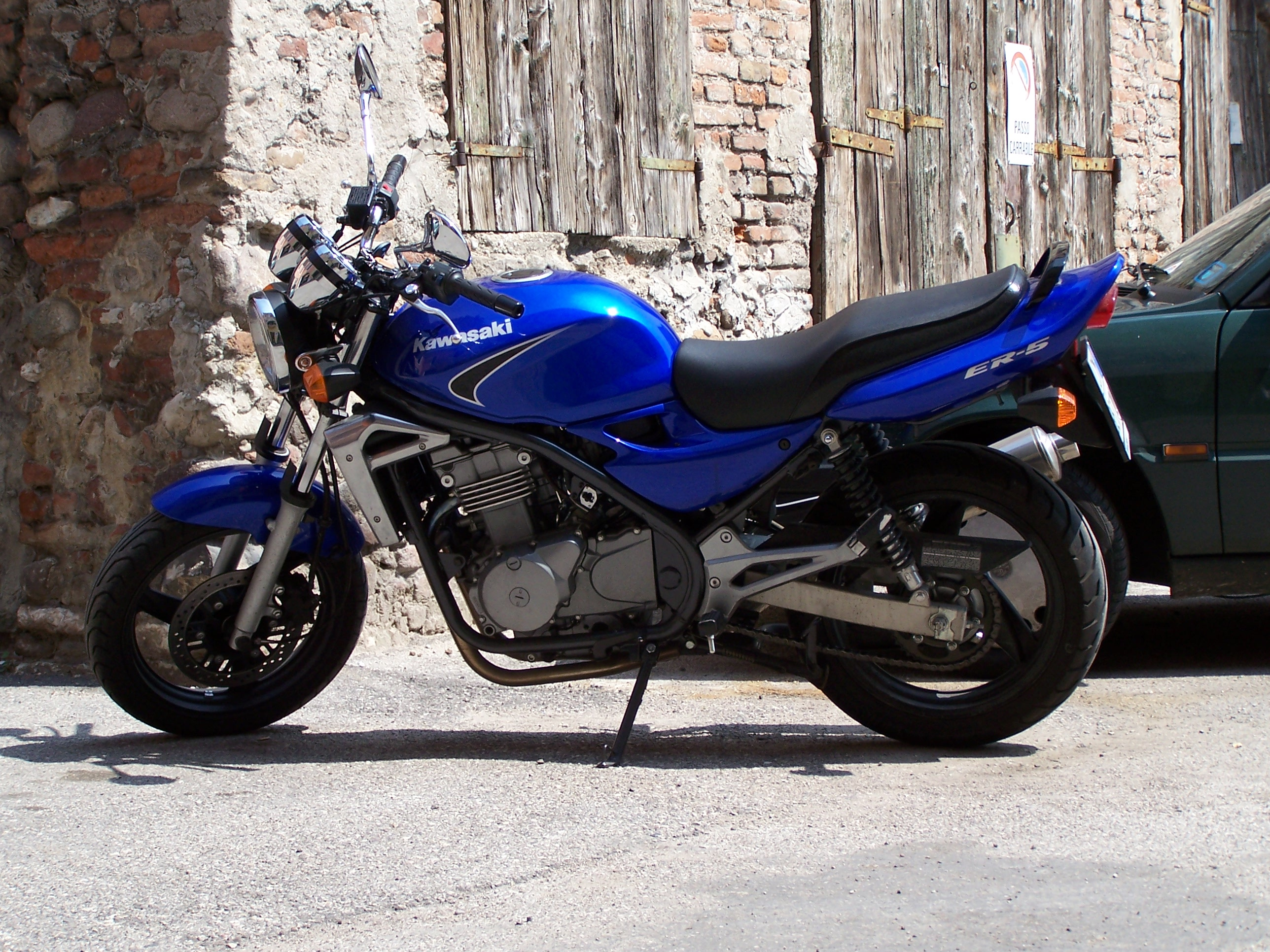
- Manufacturer: Kawasaki Motors
- Parent company: Kawasaki Heavy Industries
- Production: 1997–2006
- Successor: ER-6
- Class: Naked bike
- Engine: 498 cc parallel twin
- Bore / stroke: 74.0 mm × 58 mm (2.91 in × 2.28 in)
- Power: 36.5 kW (48.9 hp; 49.6 PS) at 8500 rpm
- Torque: 45.2 N⋅m (33.3 lbf⋅ft) at 7000
- Transmission: 6-speed
- Brakes: 280 mm single disc with twin-piston caliper (front), 160 mm expanding brake (rear)
- Tires: 110/70-17M/C (54H) (front), 130/70-17M/C (62H) (rear)
- Rake, trail: 27°, 102 mm (4.0 in)
- Wheelbase: 1430 mm
- Dimensions: L: 2070; W: 730; H: 1070 mm
- Seat height: 800 mm
- Fuel capacity: 17.00 liters
- Related: Kawasaki GPZ500

The Kawasaki ER-5 is a naked commuter motorcycle produced in Japan by Kawasaki. The bike is powered by a liquid cooled four-stroke DOHC 498 cc engine based on the design used in the GPZ500.

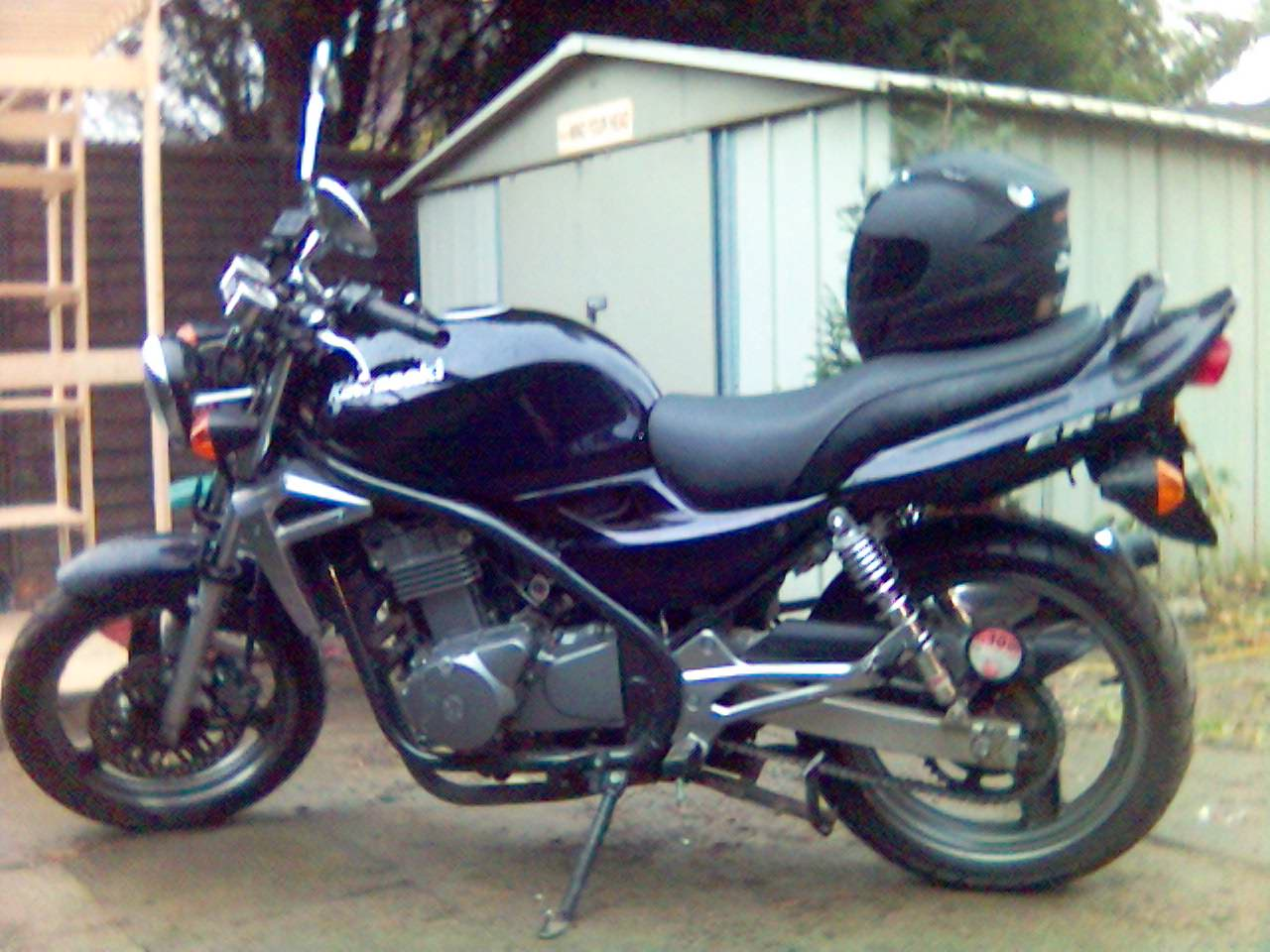
ER-5

== Engine ==
The Kawasaki ER5 is powered by a 498CC DOHC liquid cooled, in-line, parallel twin engine which produces 49.6BHP or 37kW. The engine is fed by two carburetors, one for each cylinder.

== Braking ==
The ER5 has a twin piston front disk brake and a rear drum brake. Unlike many modern motorcycles, with fixed caliper and floating disk, the ER5 has a fixed disk and floating caliper. 'A' models have a trailing piston which is smaller than the leading piston but the later 'C' models have identical leading and trailing pistons, dramatically improving front braking. 'A' model owners often fit caliper units from 'C' models. As for most motorcycles, another common braking upgrade is to reduce sponginess by replacing the OEM brake hose with a braided brake hose.

== Suspension ==
The ER5 has a non-adjustable female slider front fork, with 36 mm diameter tubes on the A series and 37 mm on the C series. The rear has a dual-shock swingarm with adjustable pre-load.

== Controls ==
The ER5 uses standard motorcycle controls; left hand clutch, right hand front brake and throttle, left foot gear stick, right foot rear brake.
