= Kawasaki KZ750 =

Type of motorcycle

The Kawasaki KZ750 L3 a sport bike motorcycle made by Kawasaki starting in 1983. It was very similar to the 1982 Gpz750. This is the year during which the Gpzs made the jump towards "sportbikes", while the KZ line branched off as "sport cruisers". This model can be distinguished by the three horizontal stripes along the gas tank and tailpiece, orange, red and yellow, and the lack of fairing typical on GPZ bikes of the same era. The Kawasaki inline-four engines are considered very robust and reliable. Therefore, this motorcycle, and others with similar engines.

== Specifications ==
=== Engine ===
- 4-stroke, DOHC, 750 cc inline four
- Air cooled
- Bore x stroke: 66.0 x 54.0 mm
- Compression ratio: 9.5
- Carbureted with Mikuni BS34 (four)
- Electric starter
- Transistorized battery and coil ignition system

== See also ==
- Kawasaki KZ305
