= Kawasaki Ninja 500R =

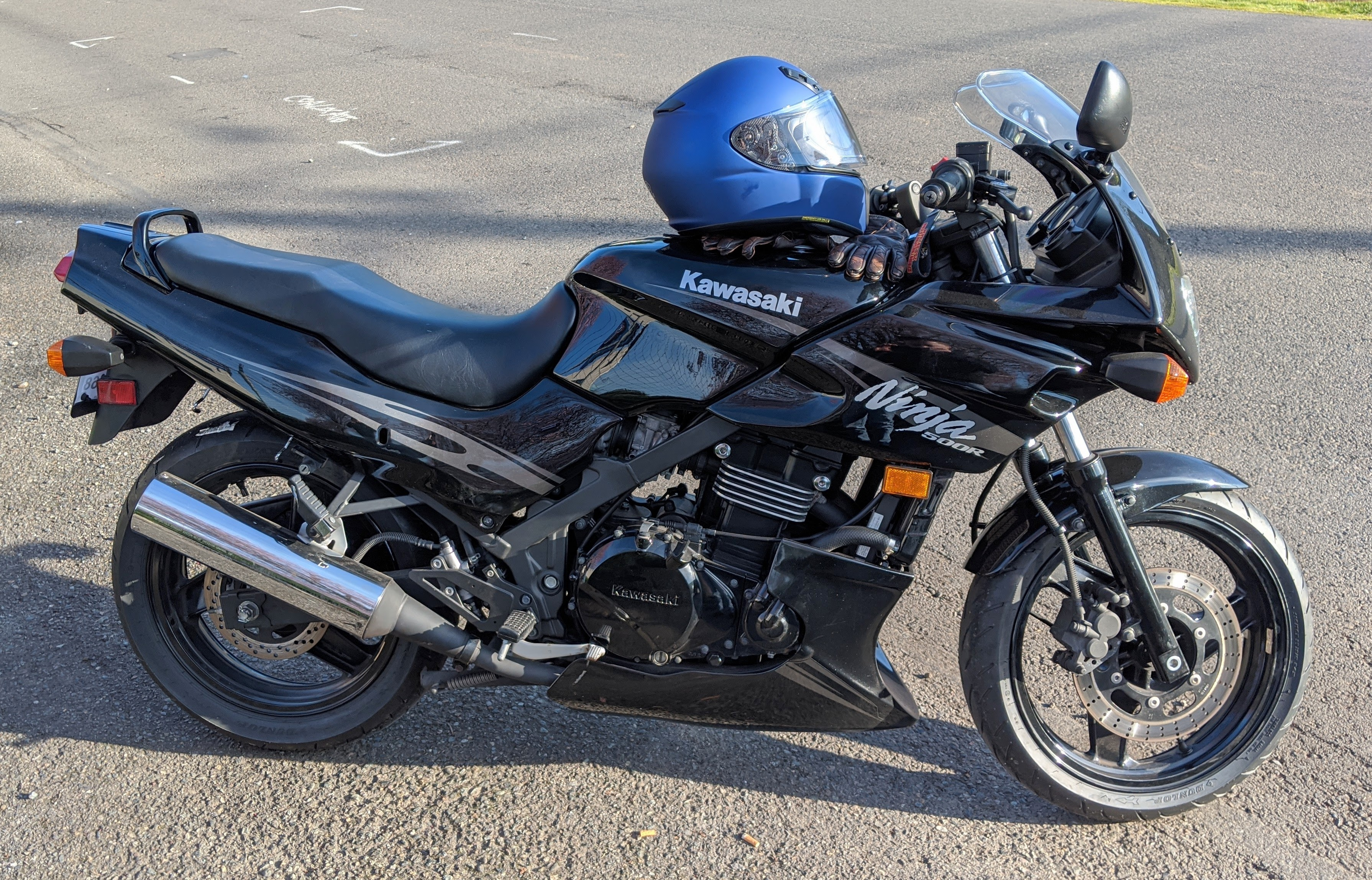
- Manufacturer: Kawasaki Motorcycle & Engine Company
- Also called: Kawasaki EX500/GPZ500S
- Parent company: Kawasaki Heavy Industries
- Production: 1987–2009
- Successor: Kawasaki Ninja 650R
- Class: Sport bike
- Engine: 498 cc (30.4 cu in) liquid-cooled 4-stroke 8-valve DOHC 180º parallel-twin
- Bore / stroke: 74 mm × 58 mm (2.9 in × 2.3 in)
- Power: 49.9 hp (37.2 kW) (rear wheel)
- Torque: 30.9 lb⋅ft (41.9 N⋅m) (rear wheel)
- Transmission: 6-speed constant mesh
- Rake, trail: 27.5° 89 mm (3.5 in) (1987–1993); 27° 91 mm (3.6 in) (1994-2009)
- Wheelbase: 1,435 mm (56.5 in)
- Dimensions: L: 2,125 mm (83.7 in) (1987); 2,110 mm (83 in) (1988–1993); 2,096 mm (82.5 in) (1994–2009); W: 685 mm (27.0 in) (1987–1993); 701 mm (27.6 in) (1994–2009)
- Seat height: 770 mm (30 in) (1987–1993); 775 mm (30.5 in) (1994–2009)
- Weight: 169 kg (373 lb) (Calif: 170 kg (370 lb)) (1987–1993); 176 kg (388 lb) (1994–2009) (dry); 185 kg (408 lb) (1987–1993); 199 kg (438 lb) (1994–2009) (wet)
- Fuel capacity: 15.9 L (3.5 imp gal; 4.2 US gal)
- Fuel consumption: 64.0 mpg_{‑US} (3.68 L/100 km; 76.9 mpg_{‑imp})
- Related: Kawasaki KLE500; Kawasaki Ninja 250R; Kawasaki Ninja 400R; Kawasaki ER-5

The Kawasaki Ninja 500R (which was originally named and is still referred to as the EX500, and is known as the GPZ500S in some markets) is a sport bike with a 498 cc (30.39 cu in) parallel-twin engine, part of the Ninja series of motorcycles manufactured by Kawasaki from 1987 to 2009, with a partial redesign in 1994. Although the motorcycle has a sporty appearance, it offers a more standard, upright riding position with greater comfort and versatility. It provides a combination of performance and low operating costs, which has made it a favorite as a first motorcycle with new riders and popular with experienced riders on a budget. 2009 was the last model year for the Ninja 500.

Given that it was Kawasaki's best-selling sport bike for a number of years, the EX500 is a popular mount for road racing, offering low price and availability of spare parts. It also offers a wide but forgiving performance envelope suitable for new riders or even veteran club racers, eschewing the significantly higher expense of campaigning 600 cc or larger supersport machines. In its latter years, the long-running (now-defunct) Production Twins class of the LRRS racing organization in New Hampshire was composed primarily of essentially stock EX500's. The United States Classic Racing Association retains a similar class, and in 2014 CCS Racing created the 500 SuperSport class, which has a competitive class for relatively stock EX500's to race against similar machinery.

Its marketing name was changed in 1994 from EX500 to Ninja 500; the R suffix was added in 1998. In Europe it was sold as the GPZ500S.

== 1994-2009 redesign ==
A partial redesign of the 500 was done in 1994. The changes made include the following:

- Bigger 17-inch wheels with wider tires replaced the original 16 inch wheels
- Redesigned front and rear fairing
- Redesigned instrument cluster and dials
- New rear disk brake replaced rear drum brake
- Firmer suspension tuning
- Minor changes to the engine to improve reliability such as changes to the alternator. More importantly the CCT (Cam Chain Tensioner), flywheel & transmission, all three of which may be retrofitted with minimal modification to any first generation bike (1987–1993).

== Performance ==
Motorcyclist magazine for 1994–2009

- Standing start ¼ mi 12.98 seconds @ 99.0 mph (159.3 km/h)
- Average fuel consumption: 48.5 mpg_{‑US} (4.85 L/100 km; 58.2 mpg_{‑imp})
- Average touring range: 233 mi (375 km)

Motorcycle Consumer News 2004

- Standing start ¼ mi: 13.9 seconds @ 97.5 mph (156.9 km/h)
- Top speed: 110 mph (180 km/h)
- 0–60 mph (0–97 km/h): 4.49 seconds
- Average fuel consumption: 64.0 mpg_{‑US} (3.68 L/100 km; 76.9 mpg_{‑imp})

== Reception ==
The EX500 and Ninja 500 have been reviewed by motorcycle magazines, separately and in comparison to other motorcycles, from time to time. Upon its introduction, the EX500 was reviewed in the January 1987 issue of Cycle magazine. With a manufacturer's suggested retail price, as of October 1, 1986, of $2899, the EX500 led Cycle to pronounce, "[o]n price alone, the EX is peerless."

In February 1992, Cycle World magazine, in an article titled "Bargain Blasters," compared the EX500 to the Yamaha Seca II, the Suzuki Bandit, and the Suzuki GS500. The Seca II came in first, with the Bandit, the EX500, and the GS500 following in that order.

In April 1994, in an article titled "Bargain Hunters," Cycle World compared the then-new Ninja 500 to the Suzuki GS500E, the Suzuki Katana 600, the Yamaha FZR600, and the Yamaha Seca II. Cycle World concluded of the EX500, "it's our pick as the best overall deal in this group," though each bike had its virtues.

== Gallery ==
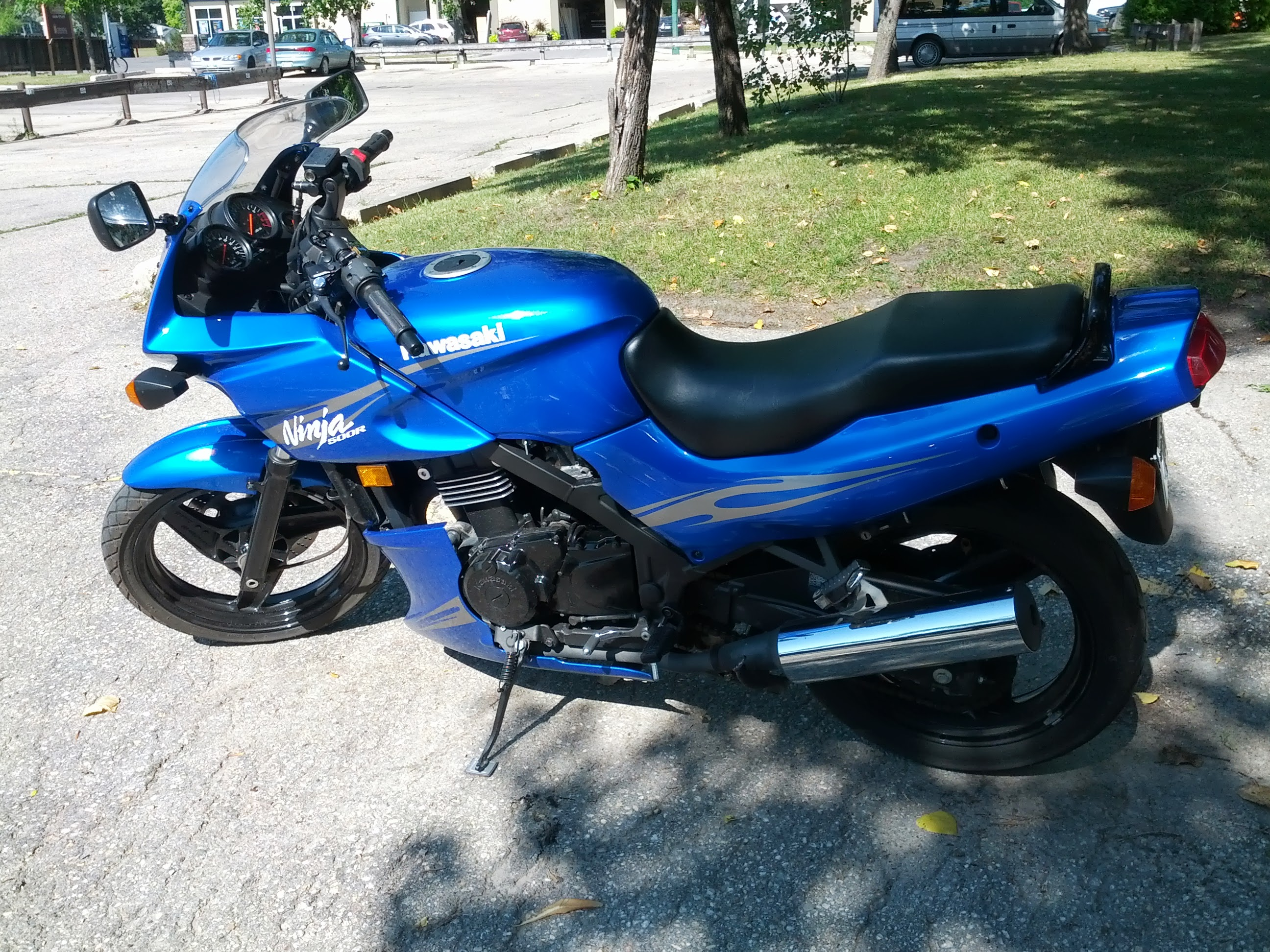
Side view of the 2009 Ninja 500R in Candy Plasma Blue

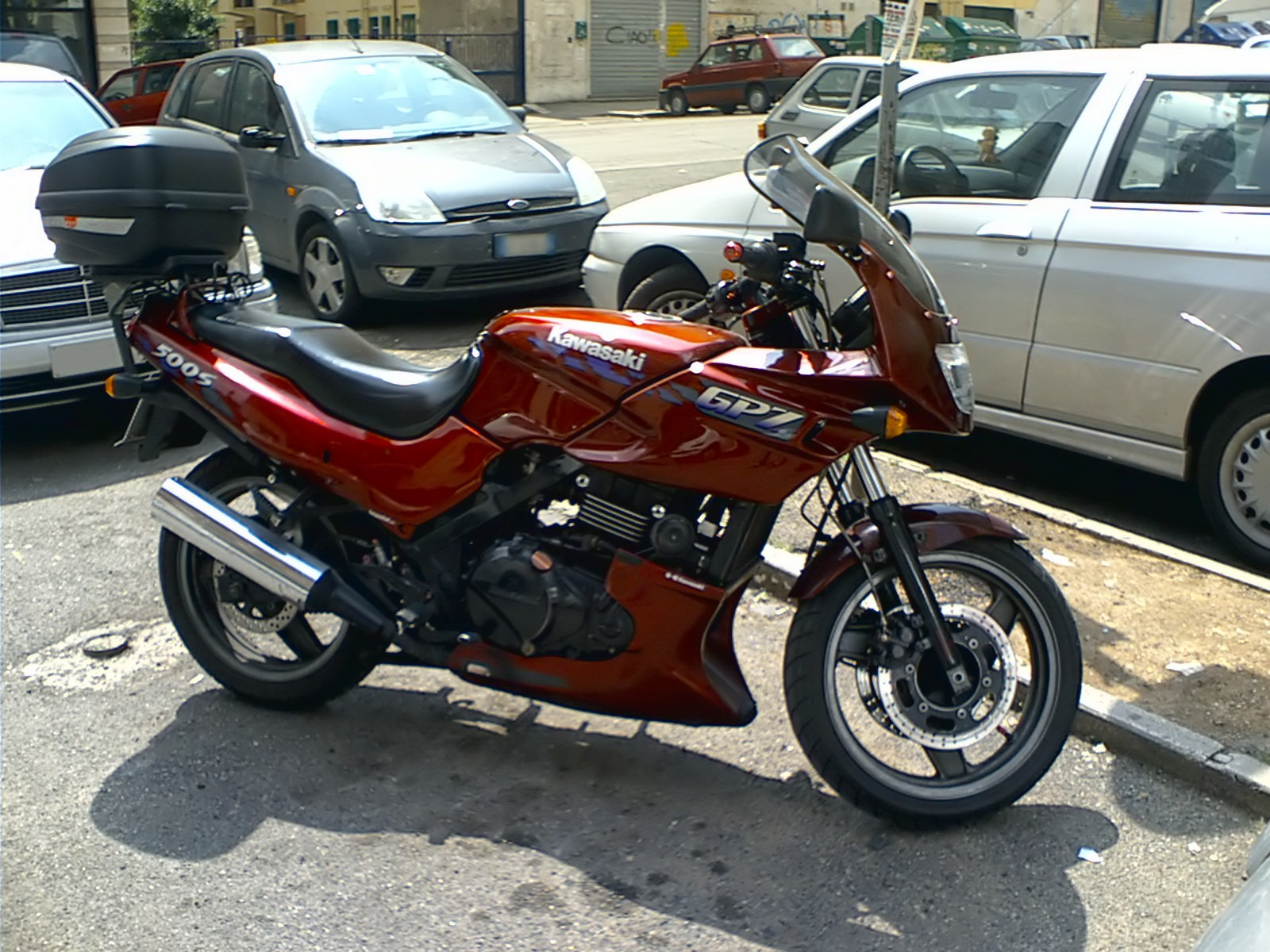
Side view of 1994 GPZ500S

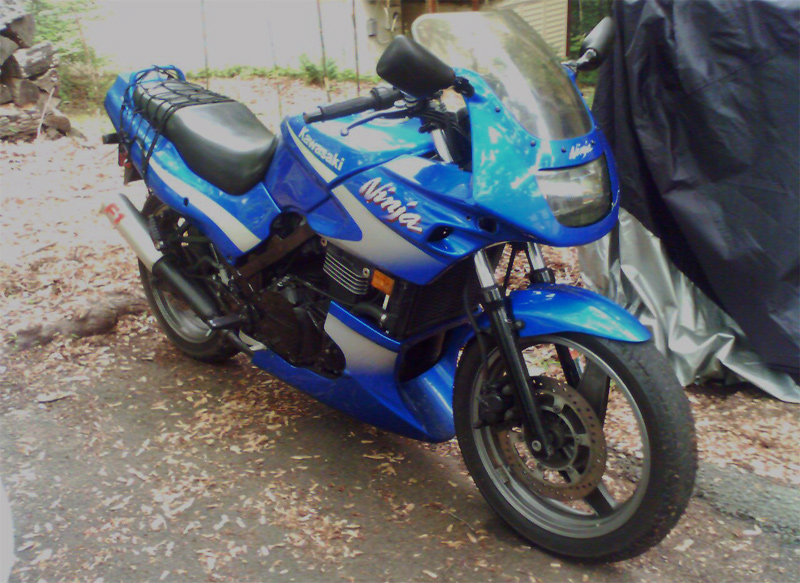
2000 Kawasaki Ninja EX-500 motorcycle

== See also ==
- Kawasaki Ninja series
