= United States Classic Racing Association =

American organization

United States Classic Racing Association LLC
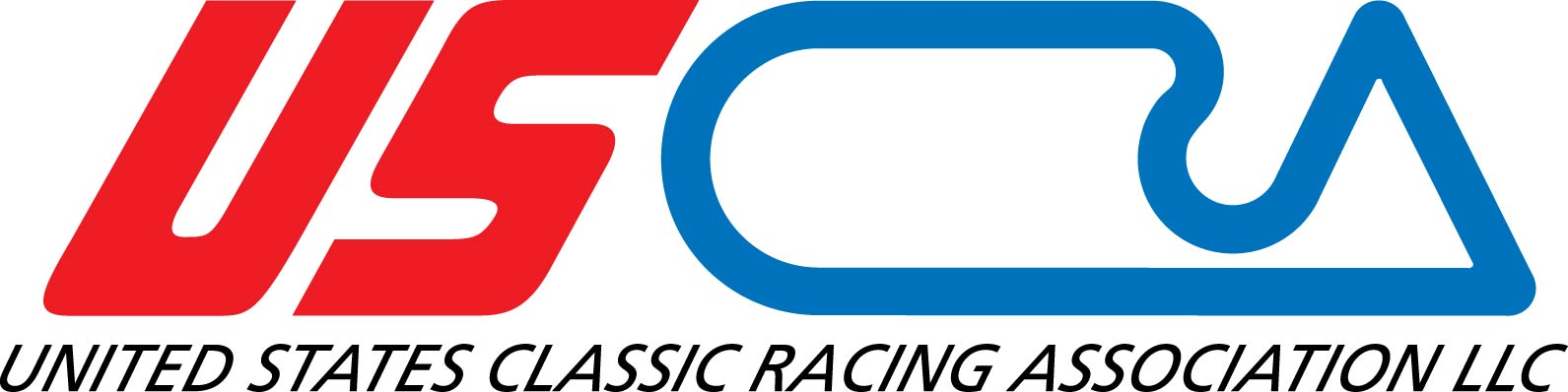
- Sport: Vintage motorcycle racing, Vintage Observed trials
- Abbreviation: USCRA
- Founded: 1982
- Regional affiliation: American Motorcyclist Association
- Director: Doug Donelan
- Replaced: Bob Coy
- (founded): Bob Coy

Official website
- www.race-uscra.com
- (United States)

The United States Classic Racing Association LLC (USCRA) is the oldest vintage motorcycle racing organization in North America. The club organizes and promotes vintage motorcycle racing events, primarily road racing.

The USCRA typically runs five racing events per year of one to three days each. Road racing events are held at New Hampshire Motor Speedway in Loudon, New Hampshire, Thompson Speedway Motorsports Park in Thompson, Connecticut and Canaan Motor Club in Canaan, New Hampshire.

The club also promotes the Tower Hill Climb held during the annual Laconia Motorcycle Week in Laconia, New Hampshire.
