= Kawasaki KZ305CSR =

The Kawasaki KZ305 CSR was a small street cruiser motorcycle produced in the early eighties.

== Specifications ==
- 306cc displacement
- Chain drive or belt drive for '81-'82 (CSR model) or belt drive for '87-'88 (LTD model)
- 6 speed transmission
- front disk, rear drum brakes
- point ignition
- Keihin CV32 carburetors

== See also ==
- Kawasaki KZ750
