= Kawasaki Z500/Z550 =

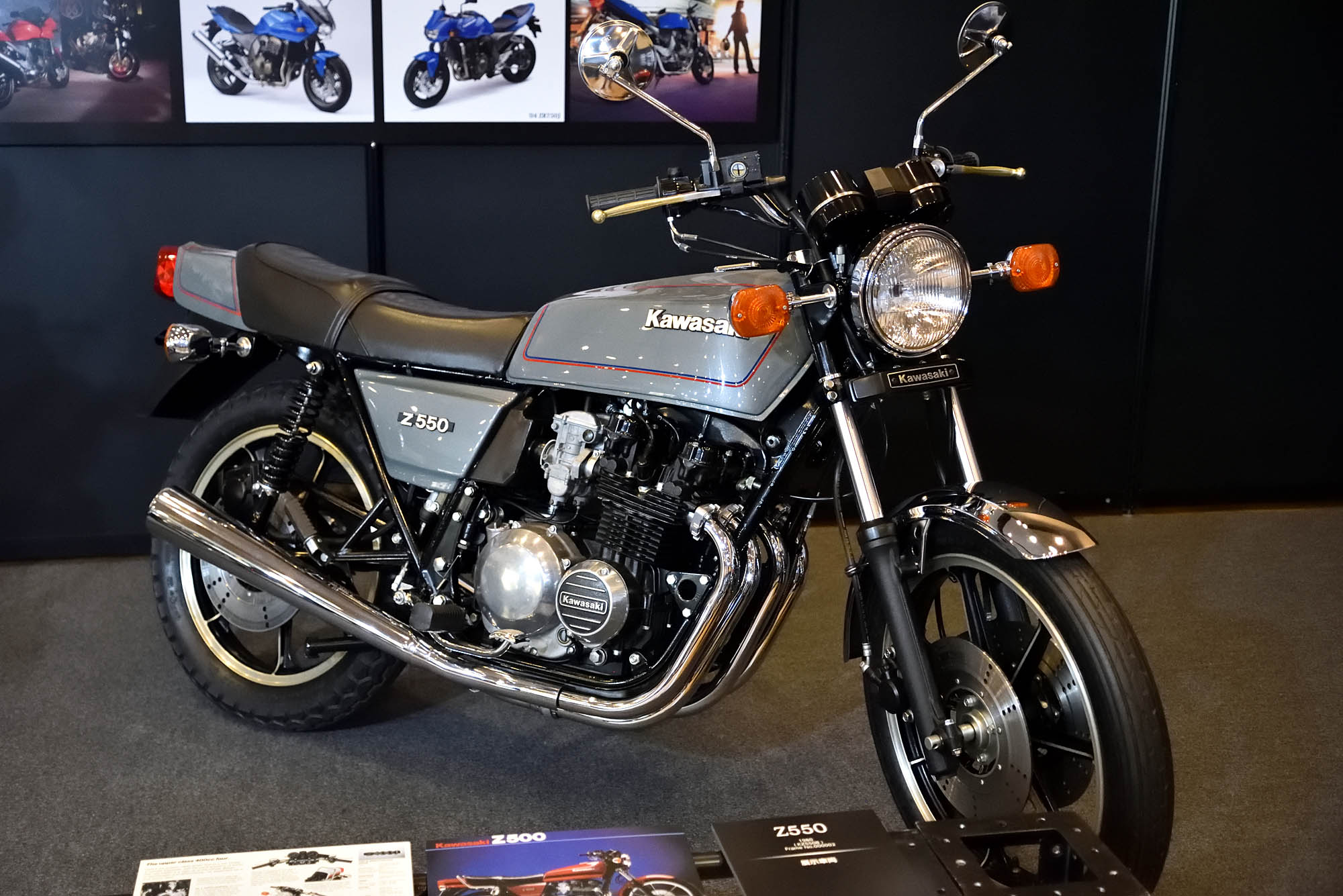
- Manufacturer: Kawasaki
- Production: 1981-1985
- Predecessor: KZ500
- Successor: ZX600 Ninja
- Class: Sport
- Engine: 553 cc 4-cylinder 4-stroke
- Bore / stroke: 58 mm × 52.4 mm (2.28 in × 2.06 in)
- Compression ratio: 10.1
- Top speed: 119mph (period test)
- Power: 54hp@ 10,000rpm
- Ignition type: electronic
- Transmission: 6-speed
- Weight: 464 lbs (210.5 kg) (wet)
- Fuel capacity: 3.8 gal
- Fuel consumption: 45-60 mpg

The Kawasaki Z500/Z550 series began with the 1979 Z500, a scaled-down version of the Kawasaki Z1R. It used a double-cradle steel frame with a transverse-mounted air-cooled 4-cylinder DOHC (Double Over Head Cam) engine—a classic Universal Japanese Motorcycle.

== Z500/Z550 (KZ550) ==
This was the first of the line, with a 500cc DOHC engine, later bored out to 553cc and also available as the 398cc Z400J (nearly identical to the Z550). Early Z550 models (1980–1981) had a double disk brake in the front (the US model KZ550 had a single disc brake) and a drum brake in the rear, with a conventional swingarm using twin shock absorbers. Later models (1982–1983) had improved brakes (twin discs in the front, with drum brake in the rear). The original Z500 (1979–1980) differed from the early Z400/Z550 models in having twin front and single rear discs.

== KZ550D, KZ550H, ZX550A (GPz550) ==
Introduced in 1981, Kawasaki was doing very well in GP racing and developed a higher performance version of the KZ550. The GPz used the same size 553cc engine, but featured higher compression, and camshafts with higher lift and more duration, and a bikini fairing. The first model, the KZ550D Gpz had the same TK22 carburetors as the KZ550, but with a slightly larger main jet which was increased from #92 to #94; later models KZ550H and ZX550A had CV carbs. The 1981 GPz550 was the undisputed king of the 550's at the racetrack, and in stock form would run the 1/4 mile at 12.65 sec, nearly as fast as the legendary Z1. A monoshock rear swingarm was introduced in 1982 on the KZ550H Gpz. In 1984 the new ZX550A GPz had revised valve timing and ignition timing, increasing power to 68 bhp. It was offered in silver with red and blue stripes as well as the introductory red. Other styling changes included a larger fairing and a new rear suspension.

== See also ==
- Kawasaki Z series
- Kawasaki GPZ series
