= Kawasaki GPZ1100 B1/B2 =

GPz1100 B1/B2
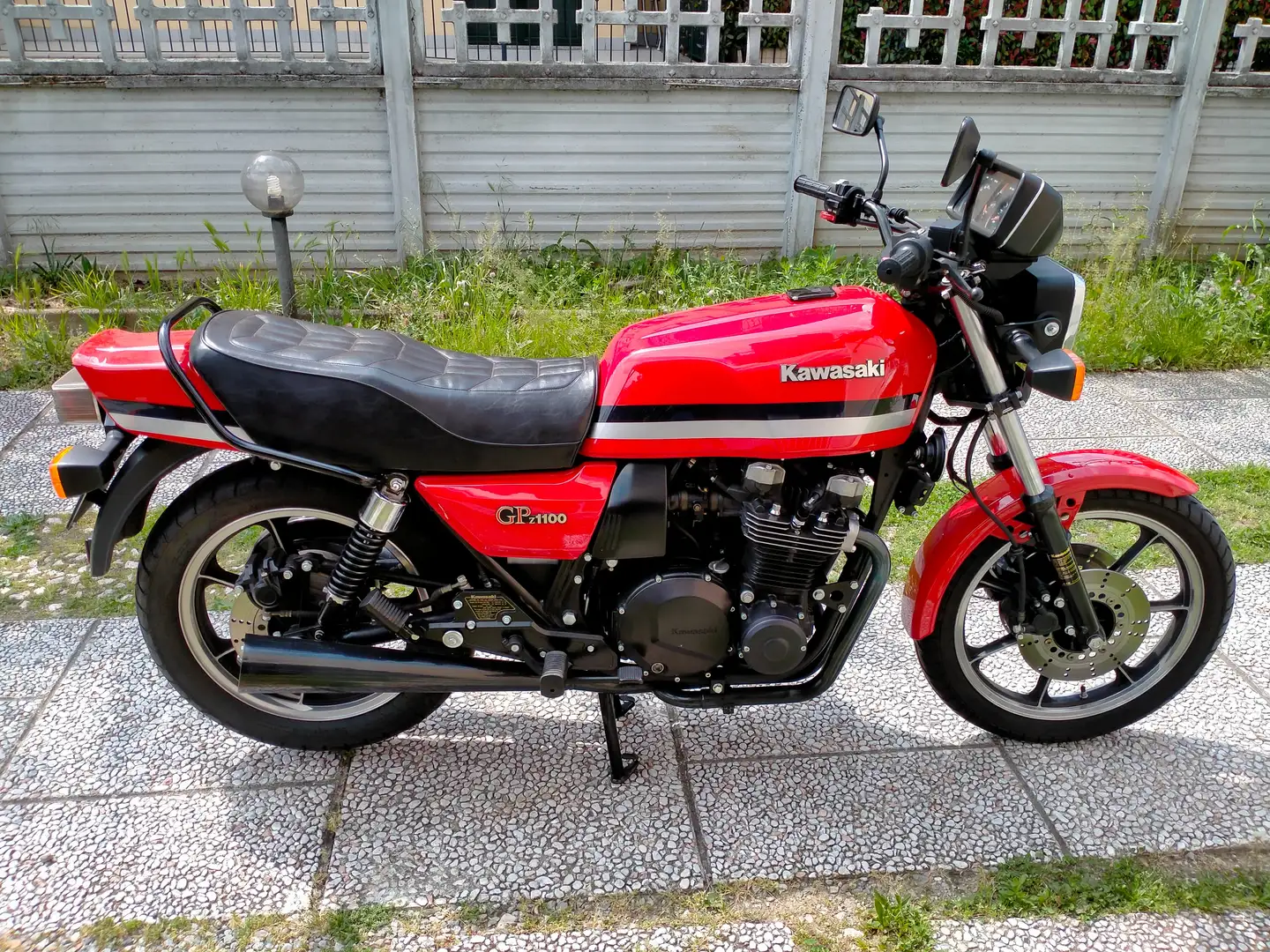
- Manufacturer: Kawasaki
- Also called: KZ1100B(GP)
- Parent company: Kawasaki Heavy Industries
- Production: 1981–1982
- Predecessor: Kawasaki Z900/1000
- Class: Sport bike
- Engine: 1,089 cc, 4-stroke, transverse 4-cylinder, air-cooled, DOHC, 2 valve per cylinder
- Bore / stroke: 72.5 mm × 66.0 mm (2.85 in × 2.60 in)
- Top speed: 217 km/h (135 mph)
- Power: 105–109 hp (78–81 kW) @ 8,500 rpm (claimed); 67 kW (90 hp) (rear wheel)
- Torque: 95.19 N⋅m (70.21 lbf⋅ft) @ 7,000 rpm
- Ignition type: Electronic
- Transmission: 5-speed
- Frame type: steel
- Suspension: Front - Telescoping fork Rear - Dual shock
- Brakes: Dual disc (front); Single disc (rear)
- Tires: Tubeless; 110/90-19 (front); 130/90-18 (rear)
- Wheelbase: 1,540 mm (60.6 inch)
- Dimensions: L: 2,265 mm (89.2 inch); W: 785 mm (30.9 inch)
- Seat height: 30.708 inch (780 mm)
- Weight: 250 kg (550 lb) (wet)
- Fuel capacity: 21.6 L (4.8 imp gal; 5.7 US gal)
- Ground clearance: 145 mm (5.7 inch)

The Kawasaki GPz1100 B1 and B2 are motorcycles that were manufactured by Kawasaki in 1981 and 1982 respectively. Both models featured a four-cylinder, two-valve air-cooled engine design with a capacity of 1,089 cc. This engine was an evolution of the powerplant used in the previous Kz1000 series, itself descended from the Z1. In 1983 the GPz1100 was completely revamped in both cosmetic styling, suspension and updated engine. The model number changed to ZX1100A1.

== Model differences ==
Cosmetically, both the B1 and B2 were released in a bright red paint called "Firecracker Red", the B2 was also available in a gold colour called "Sonic Gold". The red colour theme was a departure from early colour schemes and started the marketing campaign called the "Red Revolution" featuring the 1100, 900, 750 and 550 models.

=== Handlebars ===
The B1 had conventional 7/8" handlebars as found on all earlier Kawasaki "Z" series bikes, the B2 had clip on style handlebars that mounted to the top of the fork tube above the top triple clamp, this style then featured on the later ZX1100A models. This style was to continue to be the norm for most sports bikes, especially the Kawasaki GPZ900R series released in 1984.

=== Instruments ===
The Instruments on the B1 used bulbs for all warning lights and featured a speedometer, tachometer, fuel gauge and voltage meter. The B2 instrument panel feature the speedometer and tachometer but the fuel gauge and most of the warning indicators were replaced with an LCD. The design change also changed the wiring harness and a number of electrical connectors in the front of the motorcycle changed. The speedometer on the B1 is electronic while the B2 is cable driven. The transducer appears to generate a pulse train that is converted to a voltage to feed the speedo meter.

=== Brakes ===
The front disks of the B1 are 10 mm smaller in diameter and 1 mm thinner than the B2, the front calipers are also different but the disk brake pads are the same. The rear disks are identical in both models.

The front forks are slightly different between the two models. Both models feature air assistance, but the B1 model uses an air valve located at the top of the fork leg while the B2 uses an equaliser tube linking the two tube with a single air valve. By using an equaliser tube, each inner fork tube requires a small hole to allow the air in. The lower legs are different as the different brake disk diameter used on the two models require the mounting points to be different.

=== Fuel injection system ===
The B1 and B2 models both featured Fuel Injection manufactured by Japan Electronic Control Systems (JECS). However the 2 systems are quite different in fuel system management. The B1 model used the EFI system, where the B2 model used the later DFI system, which is a fully digitised form of electronic fuel injection. The EFI system used on the B1 model was built under licence from Bosch and is essentially a copy of the Bosch L-Jetronic fuel injection system used on many motor vehicles in the late 70's and early 80's including Nissan vehicles. The B1 model fuel injection system is very similar to the 1980 Z1000H (Limited Edition model, only 1000 made by the Kawasaki factory) and also used in the 1980 US-only Z1000G model).

This fuel injection system is a very simple analogue design that uses an air flow meter to determine engine air flow. The ECU then controls the amount of time that the fuel injectors remain open based on the signal received from the air-flow meter. This style of analogue fuel injection only has a limited number of engine management sensors, including engine temperature, incoming air temperature, engine RPM, engine air-flow and throttle position. The B1 model uses an air-flow meter that is approximately 10% larger than the Z1000H air flow meter, to provide more air flow to the larger capacity motor. Later models (B2 and ZX1100A)featured DFI (digital) fuel injection - this style of DFI uses a variable TPS which more accurately represents the throttle position than the earlier EFI, for sending signals to the ECU. The algorithm used in the B2 and ZX1100A models is Alpha-N. The DFI models also used a limited number of engine inputs for fuel system management. While the DFI system used on the later models is technically better than the earlier EFI system, the earlier fuel injection systems provide a more direct throttle response as the ECU is responding to actual air-flow through the motor, not to a pre-determined fuel map based mainly on throttle position alone.

On the B1 model (as per the Z1000H and Z1000G models), the four fuel injectors are mounted directly into the cylinder head above the inlet ports (hence the EFI system was referred to as port injection), while the B2/A (DFI) model had the more common Throttle Body Injection (TBI) where the injectors are mounted into the throttle bodies. With different throttle bodies comes a very slight difference in the air box mounting. The intake rubbers on the B1 are smaller than the B2 but a throttle body swap is possible by simply replacing the inlet rubbers.

=== Fuel system ===
The fuel level sender units are physically different between the two models, this could be due to the different methods used to report the fuel level (B1–gauge, B2–LCD). The B1 model has a fuel sender with a round tank mounting, the B2 has a rectangular mounting plate, therefore the tanks are different also. The DFI and EFI fuel delivery hardware is the same for all models from Z1000H through to ZX1100A models. The 1983 model also uses the same fuel pump and throttle bodies as the B2. The diameter of the throttle-bodies on all fuel-injected Kawasaki models is the same, at 36mm.

=== Body parts ===
The B2 model featured a bikini fairing. This resulted in a change in a number of cosmetic covers and the addition of extra mounting brackets. Because of the bikini fairing, the headlight assembly is slightly different between the two models. The frames are basically the same with a few subtle differences in the fasteners used.

The tail light of the B2 features a reflector on each side of the rear lens. The internals of the lens are also different between the two models. The tail light lens feature identical mounting, so they can be interchanged. The B1 was only released in 1981 and the B2 in 1982, after that, the dual shock 1100 models ended and the monoshock GPz1100(ZX1100-A1) were released.
