= Kawasaki KX100 =

- Manufacturer: Kawasaki Motors
- Parent company: Kawasaki Heavy Industries
- Production: 1996–present
- Class: Motocross
- Engine: 99 cc, liquid-cooled, two-stroke, single-cylinder
- Bore / stroke: 52.5 mm × 45.8 mm
- Transmission: 6-speed manual
- Frame type: Steel perimeter
- Suspension: Inverted telescopic front fork; Uni-Trak rear
- Tires: 19 in (front) / 16 in (rear)
- Weight: approx. 77 kg (170 lb) (dry)
- Fuel capacity: 5 liters (1.3 US gal)

The Kawasaki KX100 is a two-stroke motocross motorcycle produced by Kawasaki. It is positioned between the 85 cc and 125 cc classes, featuring a 19-inch front wheel and a 16-inch rear wheel, compared to the 17-inch/14-inch combination typically found on 85 cc motocross bikes.

The KX100 offers longer suspension travel and a larger engine displacement, serving as a bridge between youth and full-sized competition motorcycles.

== History ==
The origins of the KX100 trace back to the KX80 Big Wheel, introduced in 1988. That model featured an 80 cc two-stroke engine, conventional damper-rod forks, and the larger 19-inch front / 16-inch rear wheel configuration intended for taller or transitioning riders.

In 1992, the KX80 Big Wheel received its first major chassis update, including the adoption of inverted (upside-down) front forks and other refinements that improved handling and suspension performance.

The first motorcycle officially designated KX100 was released in 1996. It used a larger 100 cc version of the same two-stroke engine found in the KX80 Big Wheel, combined with the inverted fork setup introduced earlier. This version did not include a power valve system.

In 2000, Kawasaki introduced an updated KX100 engine featuring a power valve system, along with revised crankcases to accommodate the valve governor and a larger carburetor. These changes improved top-end performance and throttle response.

A further update followed around 2006, bringing modernized, symmetrical bodywork and styling cues resembling Kawasaki’s larger KX125 and KX250 motocross models. While the frame, engine, and suspension remained largely unchanged, the newer plastics and graphics gave the motorcycle a more contemporary appearance.

== Performance and characteristics ==
All models equipped with inverted forks exhibit similar suspension performance. Power-valve engines produce slightly higher peak power compared to non-valve versions, though earlier non-valve engines deliver smoother, more tractable low-to-mid-range torque that some riders prefer for off-road or trail use. Power-valve mechanisms require more maintenance and offer limited benefit in slower trail applications.

The KX100 engine can be overbored to approximately 107 cc, and with port modifications, it can produce strong low-to-mid-range power suitable for woods or enduro riding.

== Racing use ==
The KX100 is eligible for Supermini and open minicycle classes, which generally allow two-stroke motorcycles from 85 cc to 112 cc and four-stroke motorcycles up to 150 cc. In Canada and several regional racing series, it can also compete in dedicated 100 cc motocross classes. Although occasionally raced against 125 cc machines, 100 cc two-strokes are relatively uncommon in that category.

== See also ==
- Kawasaki KX80
- Kawasaki KX125
- Kawasaki KX500

== Specifications ==
- Engine: 2-stroke, liquid-cooled
- Displacement: 99cc
- Bore x Stroke: 52.5 x 45.8 mm
- Compression Ratio: 9.6:1
- Induction: Keihin PWK28 carburetor
- Transmission: 6-speed, return shift
- Final Drive: Chain
- Top Speed: 55-70 mph
- Front Suspension: 36 mm inverted telescopic
- Rear Suspension: Uni-Trak® linkage system
- Front Brake: Hydraulic disc, 220 mm
- Rear Brake: Hydraulic disc, 184 mm
- Rear Tire: 90/100-16
- Length: 1,900 mm
- Width: 820 mm
- Height: 1,165 mm
- Wheelbase:1,290 mm
- Ground Clearance: 330 mm
- Seat Height: 870 mm
- Fuel Capacity: 5.8 L
- Curb Weight: 77 kg
- Color Options: Lime Green
