= Kawasaki KX80 =

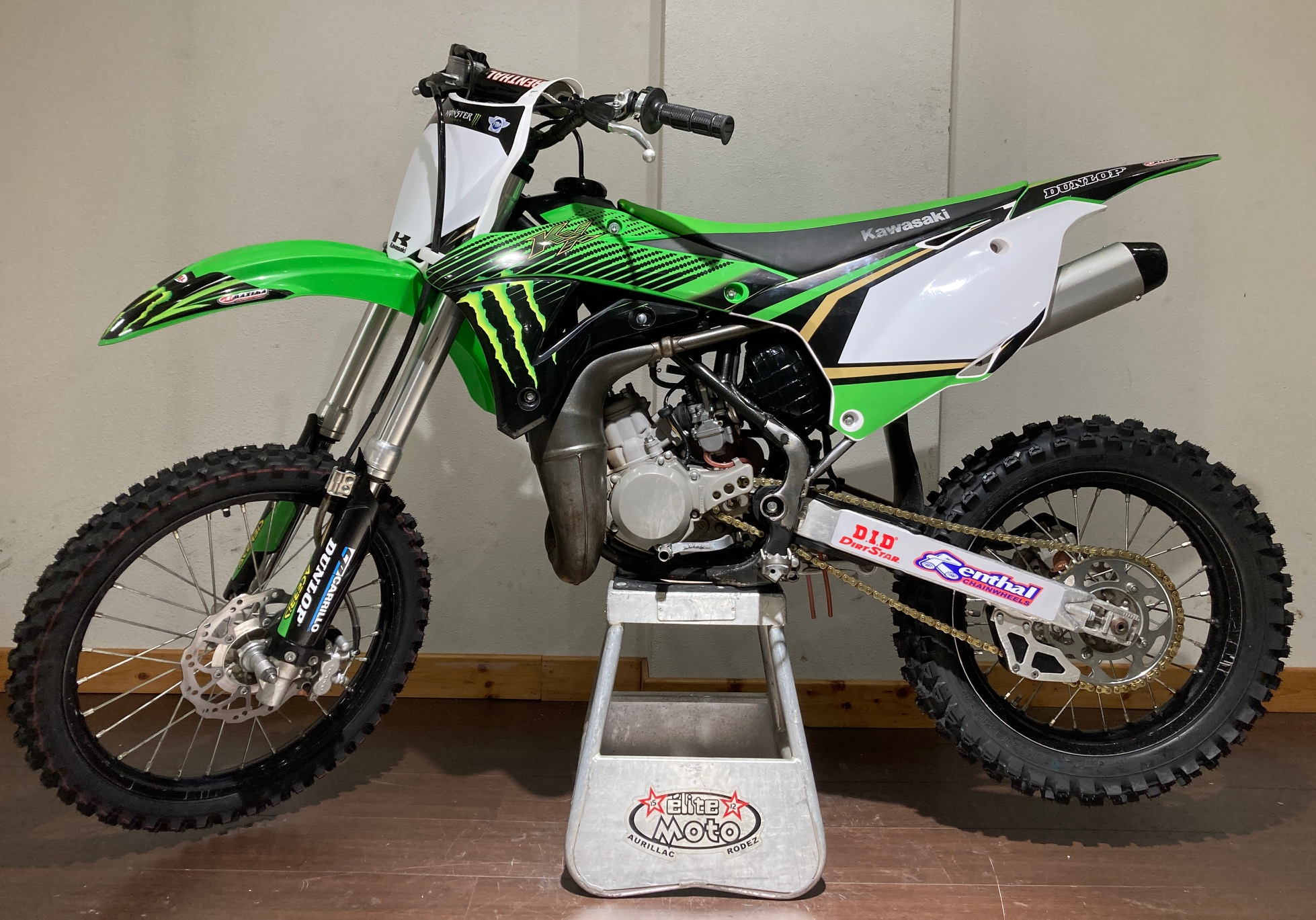
- Manufacturer: Kawasaki Motors
- Parent company: Kawasaki Heavy Industries
- Production: 1979-2000
- Successor: KX100
- Class: Motocross
- Related: Kawasaki KX125

The Kawasaki KX80 was a 80cc (79cc-82cc) enduro style offroad motorcycle, introduced in 1979 and ended production in 2000. It is a single cylinder, liquid cooled 2 stroke running at 32:1 fuel ratio with a wet clutch, 6 speed transmission. This small, powerful two-wheeler boasted an advertised 20hp, a 13-inch ground clearance, 75-mph(121 km/h) top speed stock. Uses 10w-40 wet clutch oil as crank case oil. There are big wheel and small wheel bikes to fit shorter and taller kids safely, and comfortably.
