= Kawasaki KX125 =

Kawasaki motorcycle

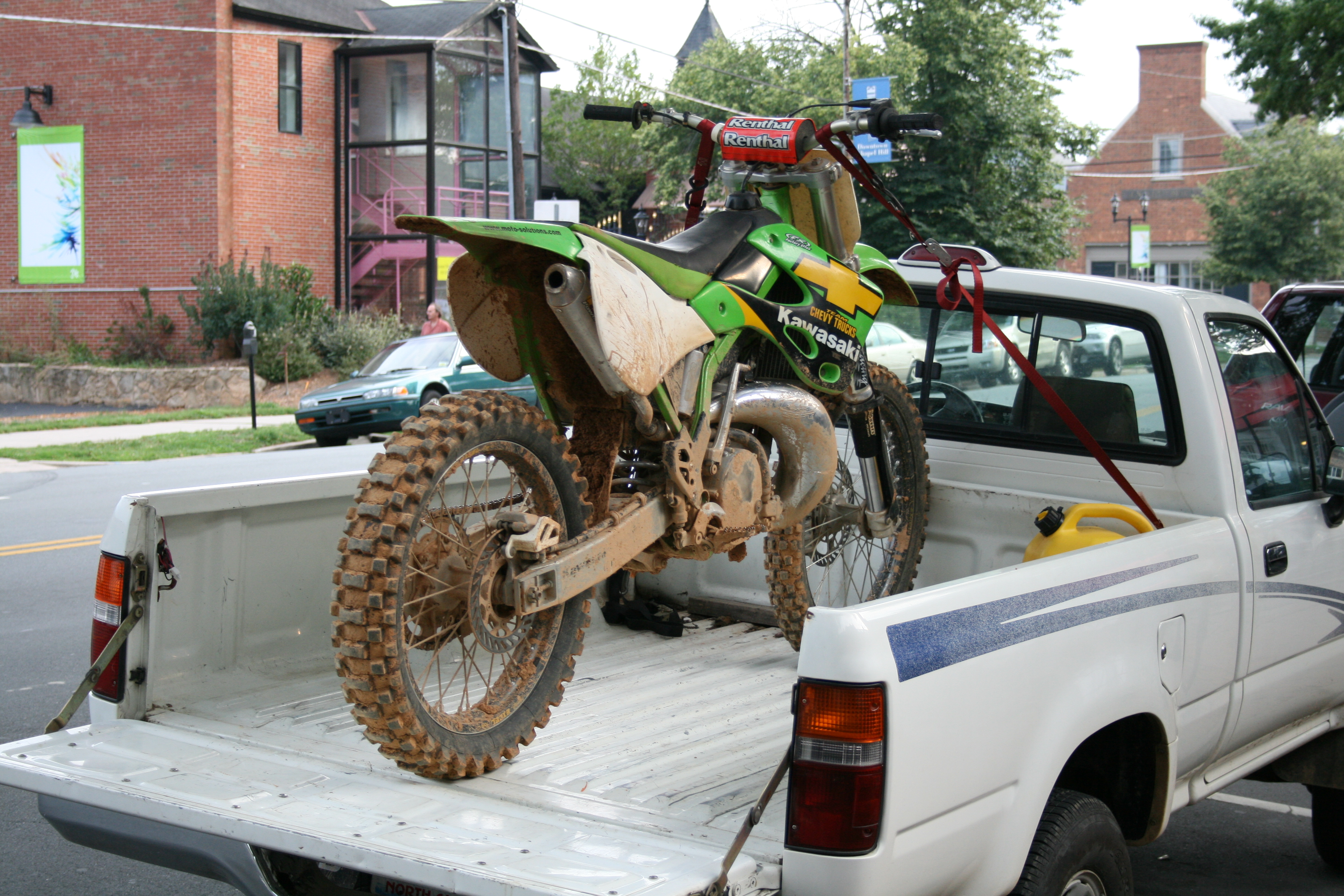
- Manufacturer: Kawasaki Motors
- Parent company: Kawasaki Heavy Industries
- Production: 1974-2008
- Successor: Kawasaki KX250F
- Class: Motocross
- Engine: 124 cc (7.6 cu in) liquid-cooled two-stroke single
- Related: Kawasaki KX500

The Kawasaki KX125 is a two-stroke, motocross motorcycle produced by Kawasaki from 1974 to 2008.

== See also ==
- Kawasaki KX100
- Kawasaki KX80
