= Kawasaki KX450F =

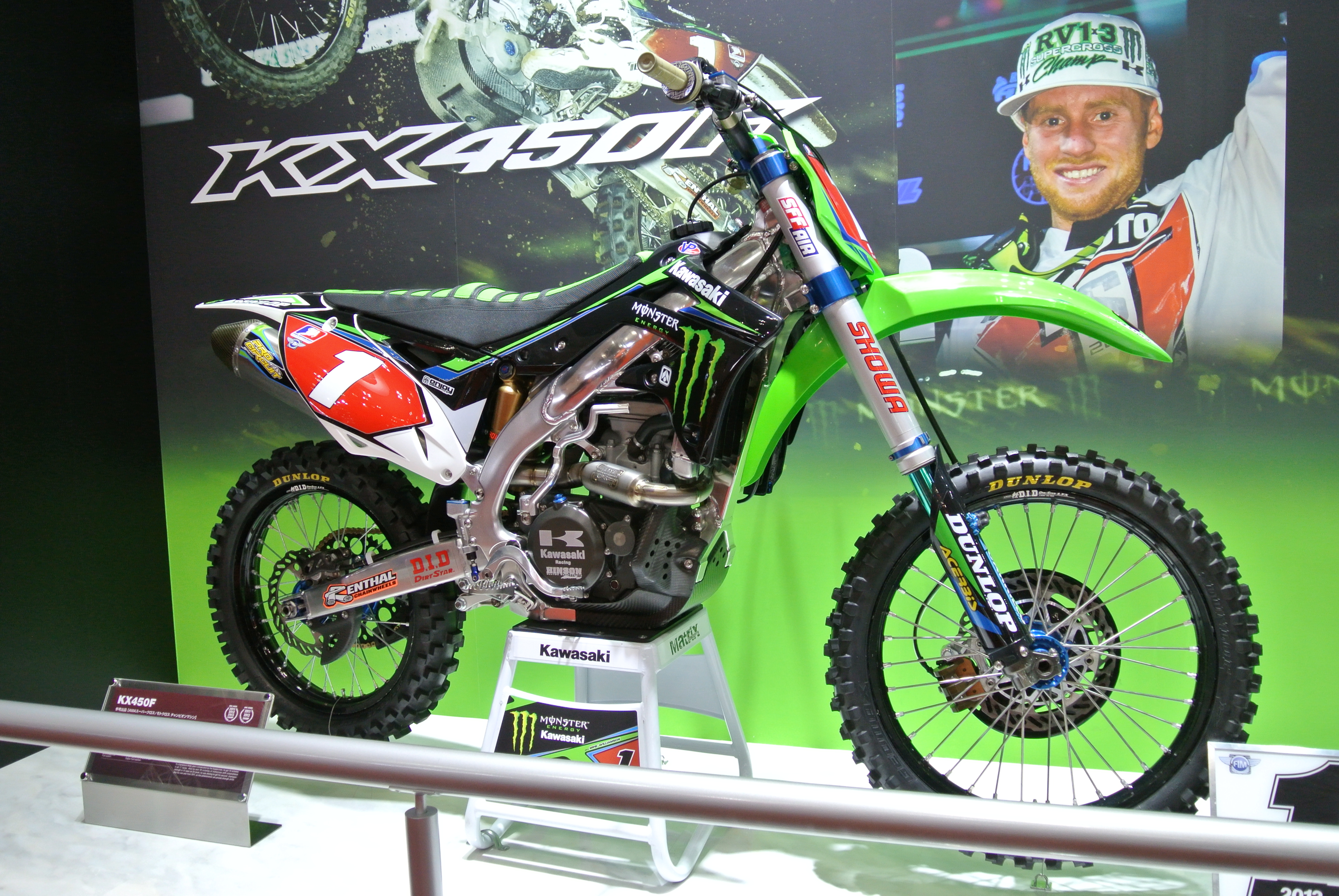
- 2013 Kawasaki KX450F
- Manufacturer: Kawasaki Motors
- Parent company: Kawasaki Heavy Industries
- Production: 2006–present
- Predecessor: Kawasaki KX500
- Class: Motocross
- Engine: 450 cc (27 cu in) liquid-cooled DOHC four-valve four-stroke single, fuel injected
- Bore / stroke: 96 mm × 62.1 mm (3.78 in × 2.44 in)
- Compression ratio: 12:8:1
- Ignition type: Digital DC-CDI
- Transmission: Five-speed with wet multi-disc manual clutch
- Frame type: Aluminum perimeter
- Brakes: F: Single semi-floating 270mm petal disc with dual piston caliper R: Single 240mm petal disc with single-piston caliper
- Tires: Front: 80/100-21; Rear: 120/80-19
- Wheelbase: 67.1 in (1,700 mm)
- Dimensions: L: 86.4 in (2,190 mm); W: 32.3 in (820 mm); H: 50.8 in (1,290 mm)
- Seat height: 37.8 in (960 mm)
- Fuel capacity: 1.66 gal.
- Related: Kawasaki KX250F

The Kawasaki KX450F is a liquid-cooled DOHC 449 cc (27.4 cu in) four-valve four-stroke single motocross motorcycle made by Kawasaki.

Since 2007, it has also come in the KLX450R versions, which has added conveniences that make it more suitable for trail riding, green laning, enduro events, and lower speed riding in general. This is due to the larger gas tank, 18 inch rear wheel, headlamp, and electric start, and a retuned engine that has less peak horsepower in favor of easier handling from more lower end torque delivered more smoothly.

== First Generation 2005-2008 ==
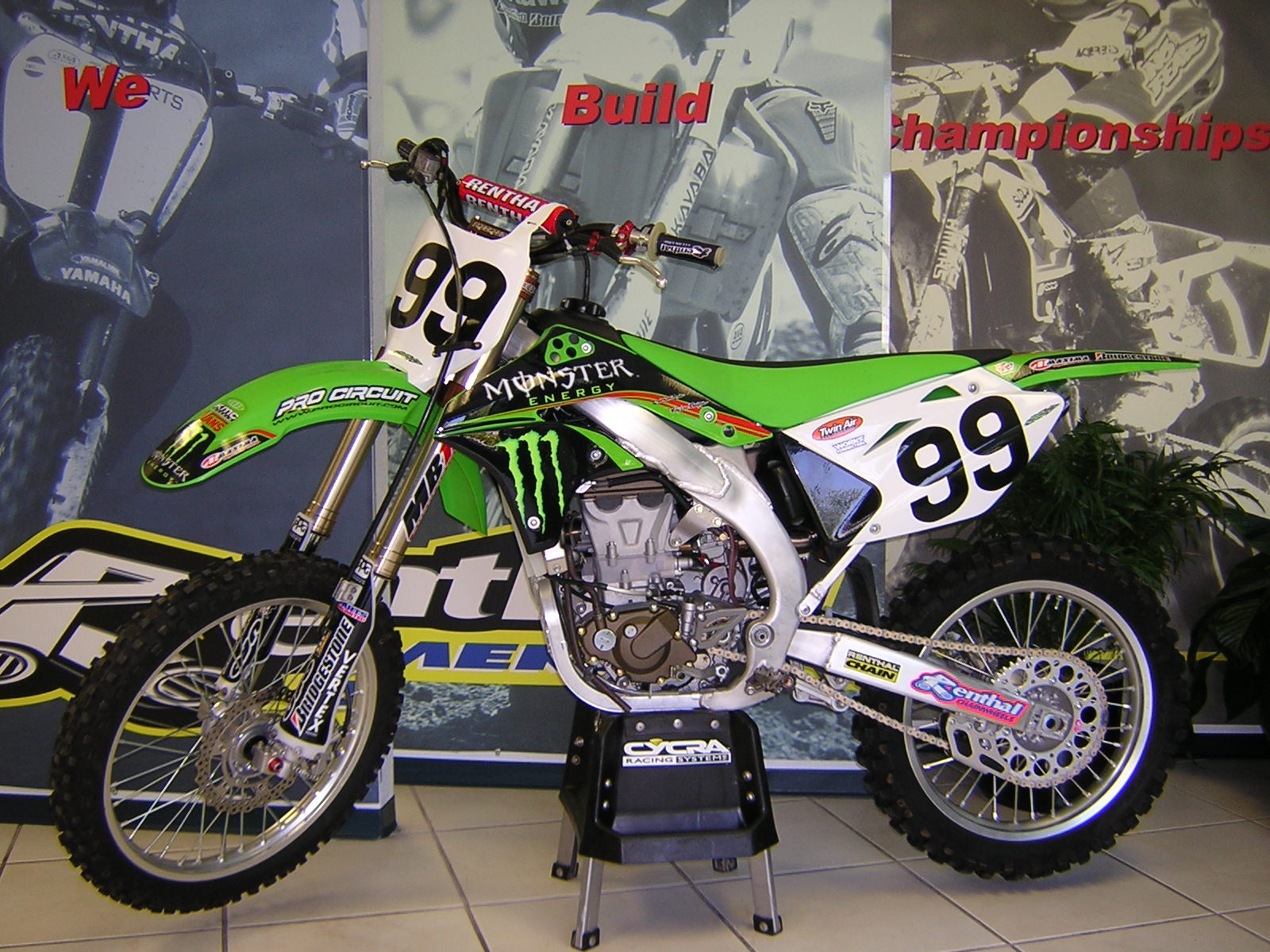
2006 Kawasaki KX450F

Unlike the Kawasaki KX250F, the KX450F was not co-developed under joint-venture with the Suzuki Motor Co. and differed greatly from Suzuki's 450cc offering. The first year of the KX450F was 2005, but the machine suffered catastrophic frame failure during the Japanese MX season. As a result, plans for a 2005 retail version were postponed and the KX450F debuted as a 2006 model in most markets.

Initial reviews of the KX450F were tepid, citing a positive response to the engine and power delivery, but finding the suspension and geometry of the bike unsatisfactory. Reviewers also took exception to the choice of a 4-speed transmission, as Kawasaki chose to break from the industry standard by not to include a fifth gear.

Despite these perceived shortcomings, the 2006 Kawasaki KX450F would win both the AMA World Supercross GP title and the BooKoo Arenacross title, as well as the Hare and Hound title.

For 2007, the KX450F received a series of minor engine and frame refinements, but the most notable upgrade was a 5-speed transmission. The transmission received a slightly taller 1st gear, while second through fourth remained the same and the fifth added.

== Second Generation 2009-2011 ==
The next major innovation would be in 2009, as Kawasaki introduced fuel injection. Reviewers raved of the performance effect of the new injectors, and in proceeding years the technology would spread across the KX lineup.

== Third Generation 2012-2015 ==
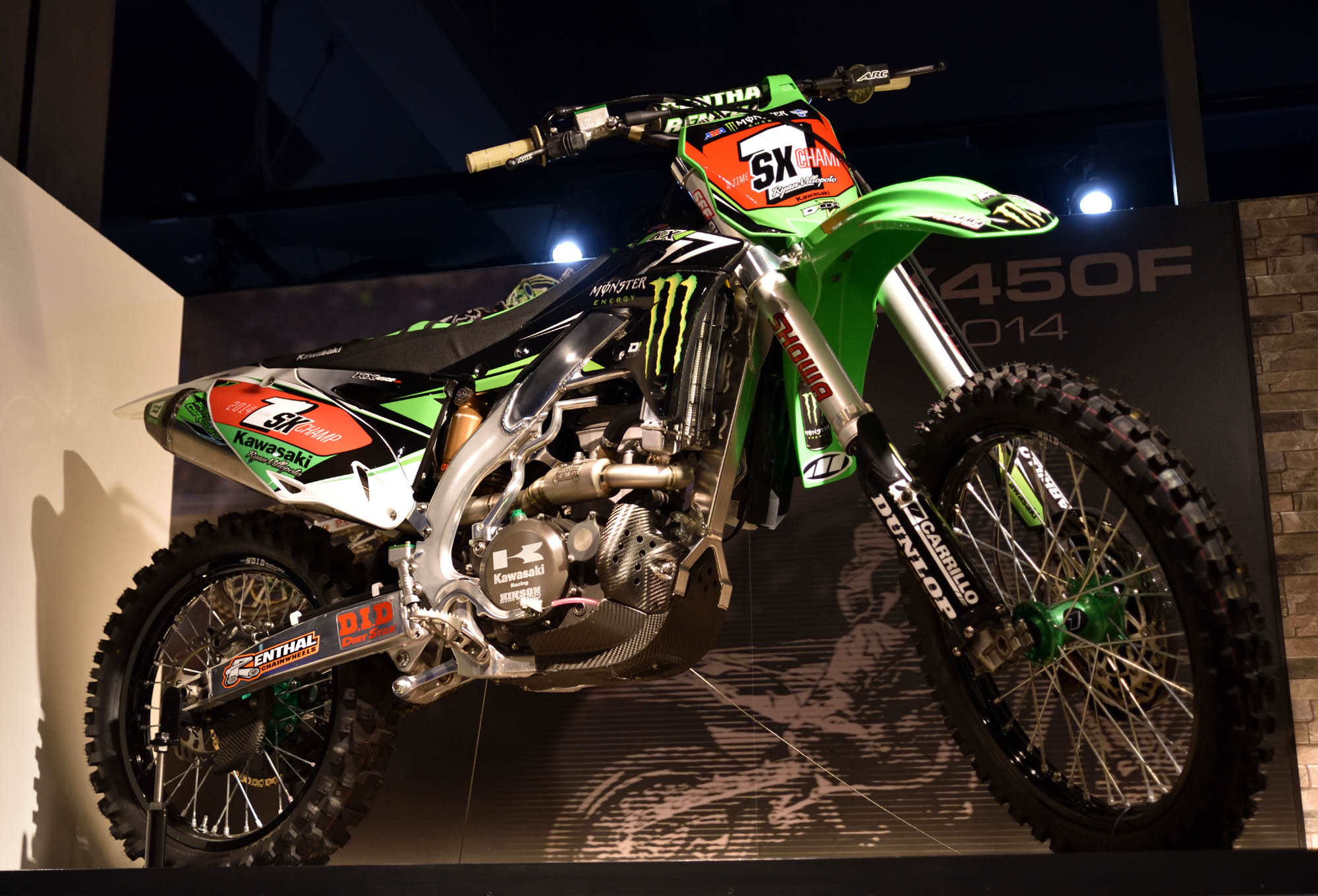
2014 Kawasaki KX450F

A series of major revisions came in 2012. The KX450F received an all new frame, significant engine modifications and a new electronics set that included Launch Control. Launch Control is designed to prevent wheel-spin at take off, and automatically disengages once third gear is reached. It is activated by holding a switch until an indicator light glows green, at which point the bikes computer modifies acceleration factors. Kawasaki has continued to insist since inception (for safety reasons) that this system is not traction control but a unique system onto itself.

These later models allow for extensive customization of the ECU using Kawasaki's optional software system, as well as including a Digital Fuel Injection (DFI) coupler system. DFI couplers allow for immediate trackside changes to the ECU through the simple change of a plug-and-play module. Kawasaki provides three modules with new bikes, a Green (standard mapping), White (soft track conditions mapping) and Black (hard track conditions mapping).

== Fourth Generation 2016-2018 ==
The 2016 KX450F is a new redesign from 2015, including significant changes to the engine, chassis and throttle body.

== Fifth Generation 2019-Present ==
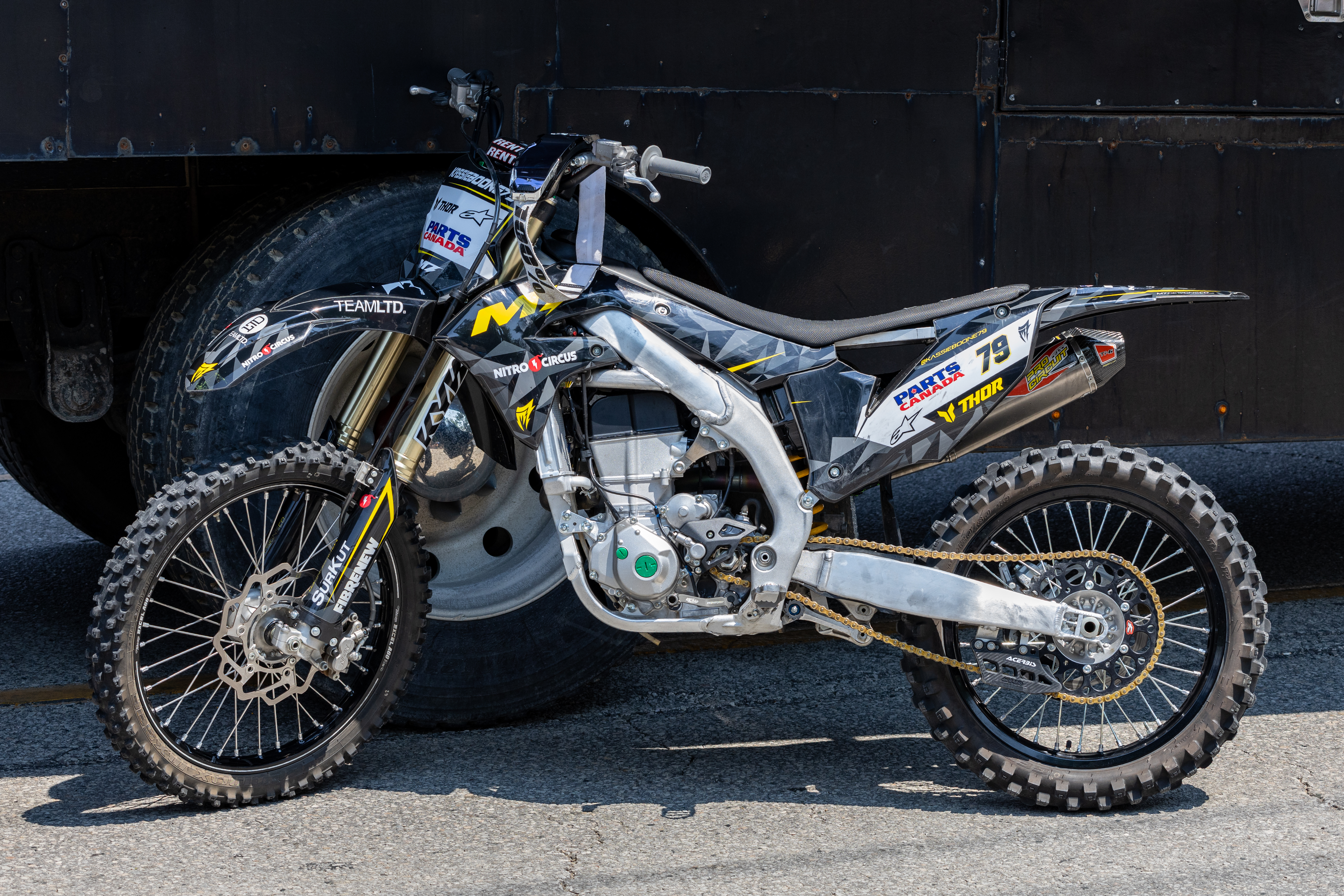
2025 Kawasaki KX450F

In 2019, Kawasaki dropped the F from the name. The 2019 KX450 is an all-new design, which includes electric start and eliminates the kick starter. The fork was switched from an air fork to a coil-based Showa fork, leveraging A-Kit technology.
