= Kawasaki KX500 =

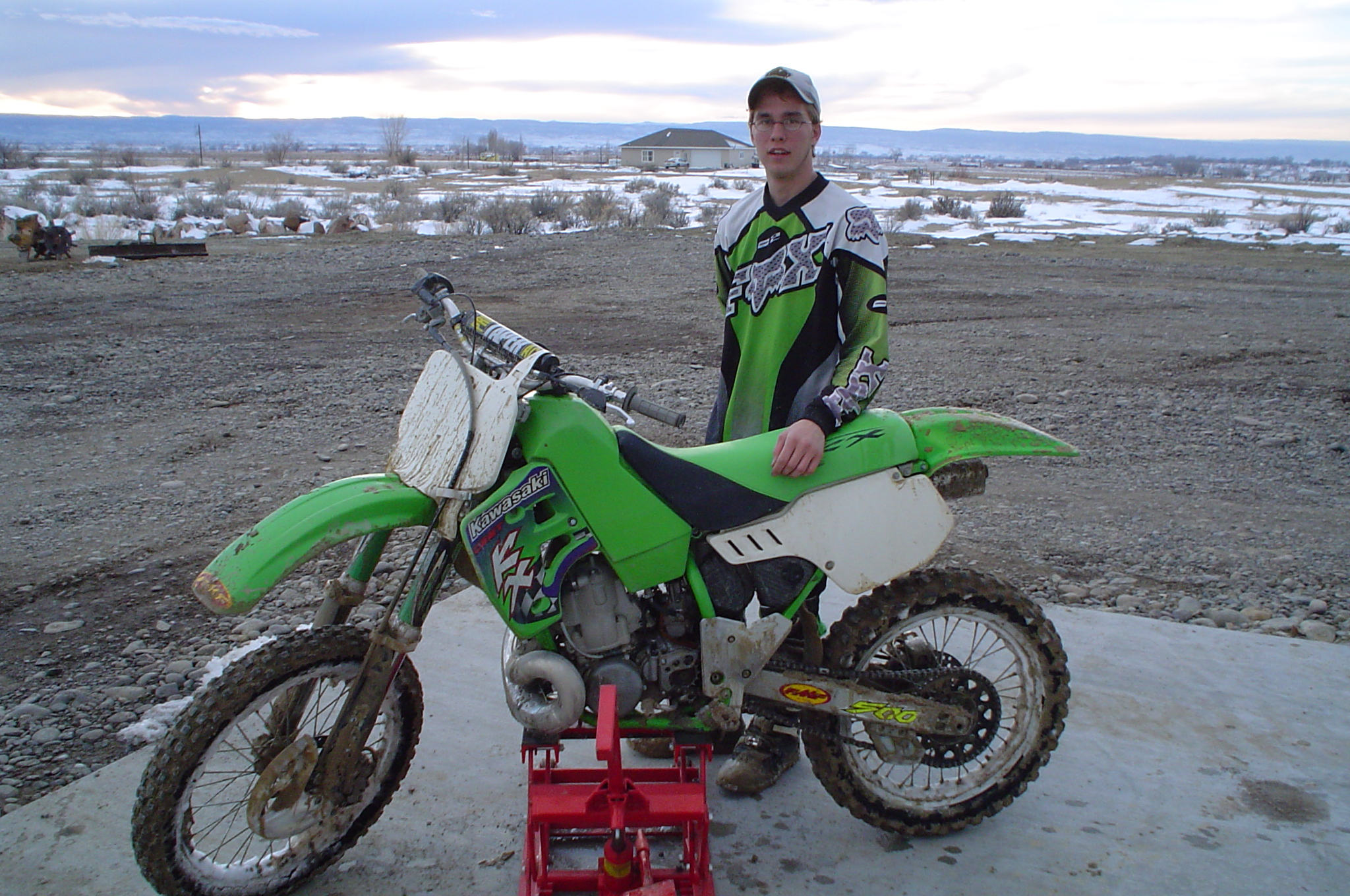
- Manufacturer: Kawasaki Motors
- Parent company: Kawasaki Heavy Industries
- Production: 1983–2004
- Predecessor: Kawasaki SR500
- Successor: Kawasaki KX450F
- Class: Motocross
- Engine: 499 cc (30.5 cu in) liquid-cooled two-stroke single
- Bore / stroke: 86 mm × 86 mm (3.4 in × 3.4 in)
- Compression ratio: 8.4:1
- Top speed: < 90 mph
- Ignition type: CDI
- Transmission: Five-speed with wet multi-disc manual clutch
- Frame type: steel
- Wheelbase: 59 in.
- Dimensions: L: 85 in. W: 32 in. H: 50.1 in.
- Seat height: 37 in.
- Weight: 220 lbs. (dry)
- Fuel capacity: 2.6 US gal (9.8 L; 2.2 imp gal)
- Related: Kawasaki KX125

The Kawasaki KX500 is a 500 cc (31 cu in) two-stroke single motocross motorcycle made by Kawasaki from 1983 until 2004.

The Kawasaki KX500 was developed as an air-cooled 500cc motocross bike for competition in the 500cc and Open-Class of motocross. At the time of its release, several top manufactured sported entries in this class, including Yamaha, Suzuki, Honda and the class-leading Maico.

== History ==
Kawasaki developed the bike on an annual basis through the 80's. The addition of liquid cooling in 1985, a new frame with improved suspension in 1987, engine updates in 1988 and reversed forks in 1990 highlight these revisions.

Kawasaki would take several years to produce a competitive bike, and when it finally did, would find the KX500 winning in events for which it was not initially designed for. Its first victories came in 1986, when Donnie Griewe won two National Hare and Hound events. These only foreshadowed Kawasaki's dominance in distance and desert racing that exploded in the 90's.

In 1989 Kawasaki captures its first National MX championship on a KX500, repeating in '90 and '92 before the series was discontinued at the close of the '93 season. But that would not be the end of the KX500's racing legacy.

Beginning in 1992, the KX500 took the victory in every Desert Nationals race through 1995, and continued to win the Desert Nationals Championship every year though 2001. It continued its winning streak in desert racing by being the victors bike at the Baja 1000 from 1988 through 1996.

== First generation (1983–84) ==
The first Generation of KX500's were air cooled, and remembered for their suspension more than overall performance. The air cooled engines were poorly reviewed in publications at the time, with Dirt Bike magazine most famously calling the bike "unridable" in their June of '83 issue. Kawasaki responded by lower compression ratios to make the bike more manageable and reliable, but would ultimately design a new engine from the ground up for the '85 model year.

== Second generation (1985–1986) ==
In 1985, Kawasaki released their first liquid cooled iteration of the KX500. The bike, with its highly praised multi link suspension and newly designed power plant, is considered the first truly competitive 500cc Kawasaki, yet failed to win a National championship.

In 1986 Kawasaki added the KIPS power valve system to the KX500 becoming the first power-valved production 500cc motocross bike. This feature along with improved performance in nearly all areas over the 1985 model allowed the 86 to win the Motocross Action Magazine 500 shootout. This was against the cartridge forked, liquid cooled, more powerful but harder to ride Honda CR500.

== Third generation (1987 KX500C) ==
In 1987 Kawasaki released their third revision of the KX500, designated KX500C. The cycle featured an 8.5:1 compression ratio with an 86mm piston that carried a single compression ring.

This bike would be the most powerful of the KX500 series, thanks to the higher compression ratio and lighter piston, producing 65 hp. Future models would lower the compression ratio to 8.4:1 and add a second compression ring, with the goal of improving reliability while making the power delivery more controllable.

The unique design of this bikes piston makes cylinder maintenance difficult, as aftermarket companies (as of 2016) do not manufacture replacements and new old stock (NOS) parts are not widely available. Due to this, it is common practice to install the nearly identical 88-04 pistons in these bikes, which share both wrist pin and piston diameter measurements. Doing so will lower the compression ratio, but still function. Cylinders from later bikes are not compatible.

== Fourth generation (1988–2004) ==
While the KX500 would continue to receive minor updates, it was with the release of the 1988 Kawasaki KX500D that consumers would see the last major engine redesign.

The 1990 KX500E would be the last bike to receive a designation change, denoting the inverted forks. The model would carry the E designation for the remainder of its run. In the early nineties, evolutionary revisions were made to the ignition to make the KX500 more adept for off-road riding, including facilitating the installation of lights for distance racing events. This shifting of focus from motocross to broader desert racing and recreational bike was result of waning interest and participation of big 500cc bikes in Open-Class and the discontinuation of the 500 National MX class- the final round being in 1993.

Lack of competition lead to stagnation, as only Honda, Maico and, briefly, KTM manufactured 500cc motocross bikes in this period. With the decline of Open-Class motocross and no need for innovation, sales of the KX500 steadily fell. The motorcycle ceased production in 2004 to make way for the Kawasaki KX450F, a newly developed bike that followed the trend of using four-Stroke engines in motocross machines.
