= Honda VT series =

Type of motorbike

The Honda VT series comprises motorbikes with two-cylinder V engines. More sporting V engined bikes are given "VTR" model numbers. Four-cylinder V-engined Hondas are designated VF or VFRs, while Honda motorbikes with inline engines mostly belong to the CB and CBR series.

== Honda's 90-Degree VT Series ==
- VT125C
- VT250
- VT250F
- VTR250
- VTR1000F

== Honda's 52-Degree VT Series ==
- VT400C
- VT500
- VT500C
- VT500E
- VT500FT
- VT600C VLX
- VT600CD VLX
- VT750C
- VT750CD
- VT750C03
- VT750DC
- VT1300CX
- VLX1300 Shadow
- VLX1800 Shadow

== Honda's 45-Degree VT Series ==
- VT700C
- VT750
- VT800
- VT1100C
- VT1100C2
- VT1100C2
- VT1100C3
- VT1100T
