= Dual ignition =

System for spark-ignition engines

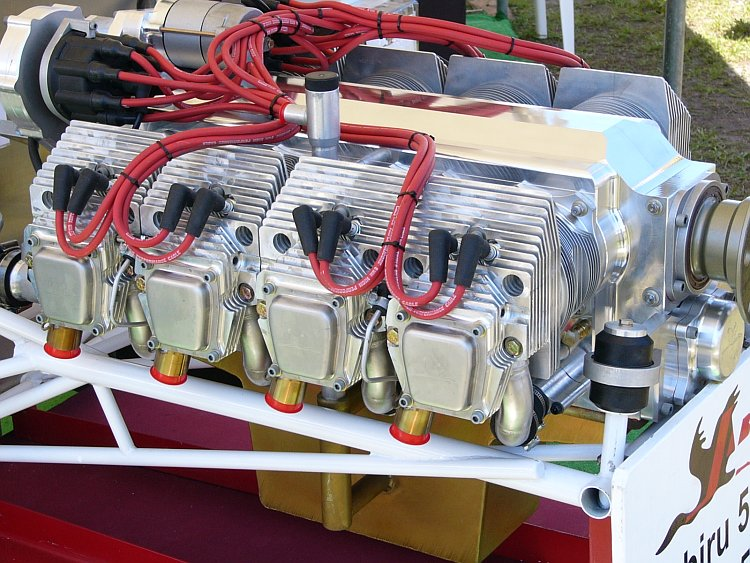
A Jabiru 5100 flat-8 four-stroke aircraft engine with dual ignition, with two spark plugs per cylinder and two distributors.

Dual Ignition is a system for spark-ignition engines, whereby critical ignition components, such as spark plugs and magnetos, are duplicated. Dual ignition is most commonly employed on aero engines, and is sometimes found on cars and motorcycles.

Dual ignition provides two advantages: redundancy in the event of in-flight failure of one ignition system; and more efficient burning of the fuel-air mixture within the combustion chamber. In aircraft and gasoline-powered fire fighting equipment, redundancy is the prime consideration, but in other vehicles the main targets are efficient combustion and meeting emission law requirements.

== Efficiency ==
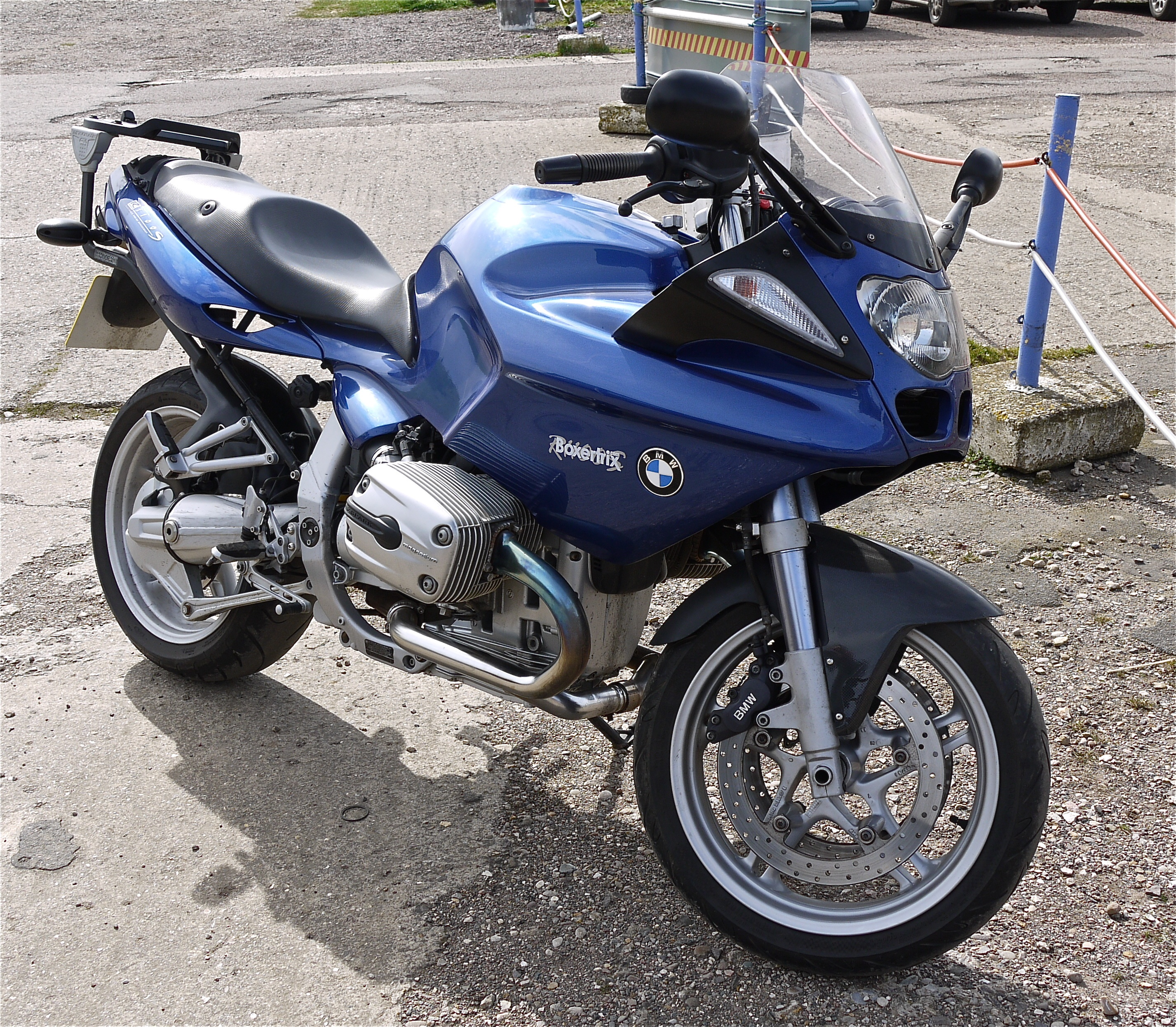
BMW R1100S with dual ignition. The second spark plug is concealed below the cylinder head.

A dual ignition system will typically provide that each cylinder has twin spark plugs, and that the engine will have at least two ignition circuits, such as duplicate magnetos or ignition coils.

Dual ignition promotes engine efficiency by initiating twin flame fronts, giving faster and more complete burning and thereby increasing power. Although a dual ignition system is a method of achieving optimum combustion and better fuel consumption, it remains rare in cars and motorcycles because of difficulties in siting the second plug within the cylinder head (thus, many dual ignition systems found on production automobiles typically were of a two valve design rather than a four valve). The Nash Ambassador for 1932-1948 used twin sparkplugs on the straight eight engine, while later Alfa Romeo Twin Spark cars use dual ignition, as do Honda cars with the i-DSI series engines, and Chrysler's Modern Hemi engine. In 1980 Nissan installed twin sparkplugs on the Nissan NAPS-Z engine, with Ford introducing it on the 1989 Ford Ranger and 1991 Ford Mustang four-cylinder models. Several modern Mercedes-Benz engines also have two spark plugs per cylinder, such as the M112 and M113 engines. Some motorcycles, such as the Honda VT500 and the Ducati Multistrada, also have dual ignition. The 2012 Ducati Multistrada was upgraded with "twin-plug cylinder heads for smoother, more efficient combustion", the change contributing to a 5% increase in torque and a 10% improvement in fuel consumption. Early BMW R1100S bikes had a single spark plug per cylinder, but after 2003 they were upgraded to dual ignition to meet emission law requirements.

== Safety ==
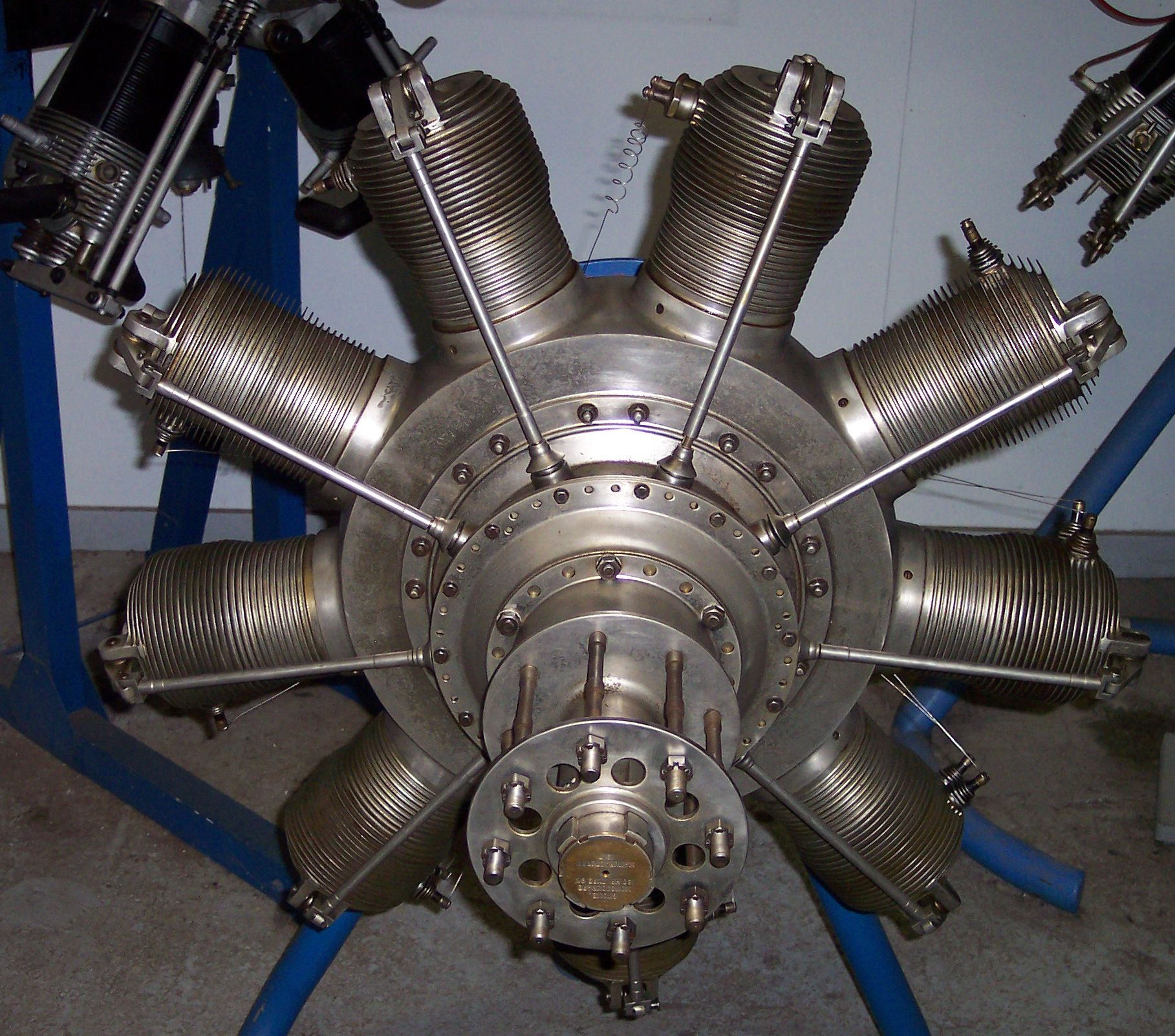
A 160 hp (119 kW) Gnome 9N Monosoupape with dual ignition provision.

Dual ignition in aero-engines should enable the aircraft to continue to fly safely after an ignition system failure. Operation of aero engines on one magneto (rather than both) typically results in an rpm drop of around 75 rpm. Its existence on aviation powerplants dates back to the World War I years, when such engines as the Hispano-Suiza 8 and Mercedes D.III, and even rotary engines as the later Gnome Monosoupape model 9N 160 hp (119 kW) versions featured twin spark plugs per cylinder.

The Hewland AE75, an inline three cylinder aero-engine created for the ARV Super2, had three ignition circuits, each circuit serving a plug in two different cylinders. If just one of the three circuits failed, all three cylinders still received sparks, and even if two circuits were to fail, the remaining circuit would keep the engine running on two cylinders.

=== Partial dual ignition ===
While true dual ignition uses completely separate and redundant systems, some certified engines, such as the Lycoming O-320-H2AD use a single engine magneto drive-shaft turning two separate magnetos. Whilst saving weight, this creates a single point of failure in mechanical terms, that could cause both ignition systems to cease working.

A simple form of partial dual ignition on some amateur-built aircraft uses a single spark plug, but duplicates the coil and pick-up for better redundancy than traditional single ignition.

A further form of partial dual ignition (such as on the Honda VT500) is for each cylinder to have a single HT coil which sends the current to one plug and completes the circuit via the second plug, rather than via the earth. This system requires a voltage sufficient to jump both plug gaps, but an advantage is that if one plug fouls, the fouled plug may burn itself clean while the engine continues running.

== Wankel engines ==
Wankel engines have such an elongated combustion chamber that even non-aero wankel engines may adopt dual ignition to promote better combustion. The MidWest AE series Wankel aero-engine has twin plugs per chamber, but these are placed side-by-side, not sequentially, so their main purpose is to give redundancy rather than improved combustion.

== Distillate fuel ==
Richard W. Dilworth of the Electo-Motive Corporation devised a system, using four spark plugs and one carburettor per cylinder, in order to burn "distillate" fuel in train car engines. Because such heavy, but cheap, fuel was hard to ignite, a quadruple system of ignition was used in order to burn fuel roughly equivalent to kerosene or home heating fuel. By using this distillate fuel, that cost as little as one-fifth the price of gasoline before the Great Depression, a railroad could save substantially on fuel costs. However, this patented ignition system saw little commercial use.
