= Honda Euro Sport =

Motorcycle

The Honda Euro Sport (or VT500E Euro) is a motorcycle in the Honda VT series. It was made between 1983 and 1987 but it only sold about a tenth as many as the Honda CX500 it replaced, at least in Germany.

== Similar models ==
Although looking entirely different, the VT500E Euro is actually quite close to the VT500FT Ascot in principle, despite the latter sharing many more parts with the VT500C Shadow cruiser. All three shared the same Honda VT500 engine and drivetrain, however.

== Features ==
The Euro was meant to be a sporty bike with sport touring aspiration. A big 17 litre tank, or 4.5 US gallons, gives it a much greater range than the other two models. The footpegs sit further back and the handlebars are lower than on the Ascot, and especially the Shadow, without being anywhere near racy. The passenger portion of the seat is not nearly as cozy as the bit offered to the rider; narrower, shorter and with high set pegs.

== Performance ==
Neither Ascot nor Shadow can keep up with the Euro in actual performance, despite claimed power being the same (Shadow) or just 2 hp less (Ascot). The 50 hp helped the Euro to a top speed of 187 km/h / 116 mph when tested by Motorrad magazine of Germany in 1983.
