= Honda Shadow Sabre =

Cruiser-type motorcycle part of the larger family of Honda Shadow

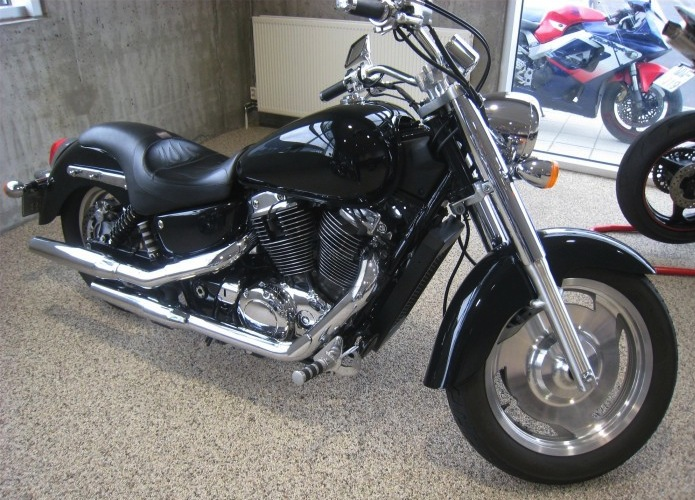
- 2001 Honda VT Shadow Sabre 1100
- Manufacturer: Honda
- Production: 2000–2007
- Predecessor: Spirit, ACE
- Class: Cruiser
- Engine: 1,099 cc (67.1 cu in), SOHC, 45° V-twin, three valves per cylinder Bore × Stroke: 87.5 mm × 91.4 mm (3.4 in × 3.6 in); Compression ratio: 8.0:1
- Top speed: 107 mph (172 km/h)
- Power: 51.4 kW (68.9 hp) @ 4,500 rpm at the crankshaft
- Torque: 93.4 N⋅m (68.9 lb⋅ft) @ 2,750 rpm at the crankshaft
- Transmission: Manual sequential 5-speed Shaft drive
- Suspension: Front: 41 mm fork Rear: Dual shocks with five-position spring preload adjustability
- Brakes: Front: Single 316mm disc with twin-piston caliper Rear: Single 276mm disc with single-piston caliper
- Tires: Front: 120/90-18; Rear: 170/80-15
- Rake, trail: 32.4°, 161 mm (6.3 in)
- Wheelbase: 1,650 mm (65 in)
- Dimensions: L: 2,440 mm (96 in); W: 965 mm (38.0 in); H: 1,160 mm (46 in)
- Seat height: 691 mm (27.2 in)
- Weight: 259.9 kg (573 lb) (dry); 277.6 kg (612 lb) (wet)
- Fuel capacity: 15.9 L (3.5 imp gal; 4.2 US gal)
- Fuel consumption: 19.34 km/L (54.6 mpg_{‑imp}; 45.5 mpg_{‑US})

The Honda Shadow Sabre (VT1100C2) refers to a cruiser-type motorcycle, that is part of the larger family of Honda Shadow. It was introduced in 2000 replacing the earlier Shadow A.C.E. It was retired after the year 2007. The Sabre name is being used again in the new 2010 Honda VT1300C custom line.

The Shadow Sabre was, at its introduction, the hot rod (or in motorcycle jargon, the street rod) of Honda's cruiser line. As such, it has lower gearing than other 1100cc Shadows, for a stronger punch off the line, while retaining exactly the same (dual pin crank) engine as the others. The Sabre, as with the other Shadow 1100 models, were made at Honda's Marysville Motorcycle Plant in Ohio, for the domestic and export markets.
