= Honda VT250 =

Honda motorcycle

Honda VT250 Spada MC20
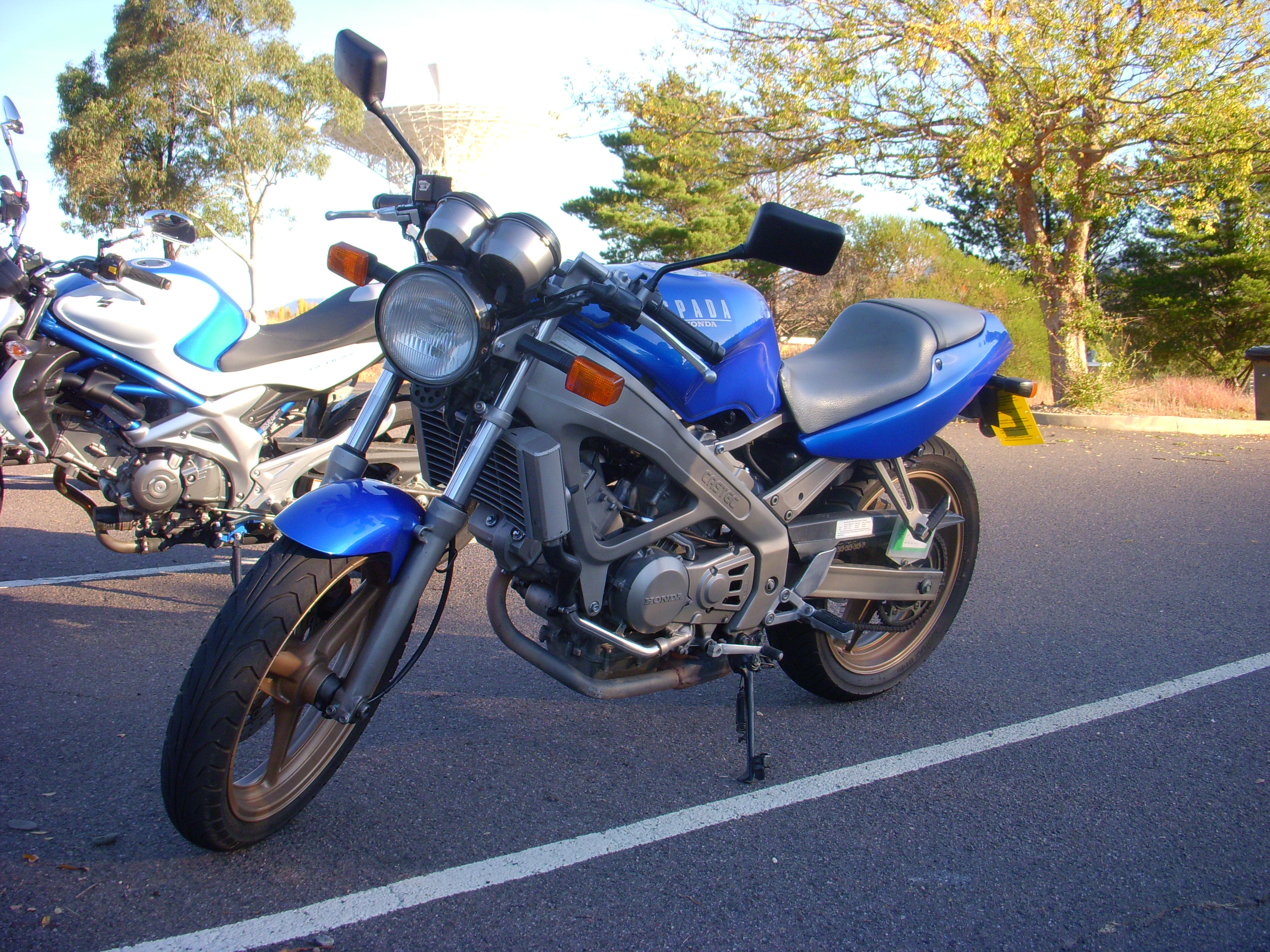
- Honda VT250 Spada
- Manufacturer: Honda
- Also called: Spada; MC20
- Predecessor: VT250F
- Successor: VTR250
- Class: Sport bike
- Engine: Liquid-cooled; 249 cc (15.2 cu in); 4 valves per cylinder V-twin
- Bore / stroke: 60.1 mm × 44.1 mm (2.37 in × 1.74 in)
- Power: 40 hp (30 kW) @ 12000 rpm
- Ignition type: Electric start
- Transmission: 6-speed manual, chain drive
- Frame type: Aluminum
- Suspension: Front tyre: 110/80R17; Rear tyre: 140/70R17
- Brakes: Front: single disc Rear: single disc
- Wheelbase: 1,380 mm (54 in)
- Seat height: 740 mm (29 in)
- Fuel capacity: 11 L (2.4 imp gal; 2.9 US gal)

The VT250 or Spada MC20 is a Honda motorcycle built between late 1988 and the end of 1989.

The VT250 Spada used Nissin brakes, Enkei wheels and a Showa rear-shock. The model was principally marketed in Asia, Australia and New Zealand. Following the VT250 Spada, the Honda VTR250 was produced, which had a trellis frame in place of the cast aluminium frame.

== Predecessor ==
The VT250F is a semi-faired, sport bike first produced by Honda in 1982.

The motorcycle had a DOHC 4-valve-per-cylinder, 90-degree water-cooled V-twin engine, which significantly reduced primary vibration when compared to inline twin engines used on similar machines. The V-twin engine also allowed the motorcycle to have a low centre of gravity and a low seat height.

The front brake was a single inboard ventilated disc that was developed to improve brake performance and feel. This was only seen on Honda models for a few years, before a switch to sintered metal brake pads with the more traditional disc/caliper arrangement. Other features included a hydraulic clutch, Comstar wheels with tubeless tyres, TRAC anti-dive front forks and Pro-Link rear suspension. Engine coolant passed through one of the frame tubes. The early UK specification model had built-in front fairing indicators, and optional radiator side-cowls and belly pan. Following the VT250F, the VT250 Spada and VTR250 were produced.

== Successor ==
The Honda VTR250 is a 90° V-twin motorcycle produced by Honda that has so far had one major revision. The original VTR250 was a faired model sold only in the US and Canada from 1988 to 1990. The current model VTR250 is a naked bike, produced from 1997 to the present, available only in the Asia-Pacific region, and for 2009, Europe.

The Honda Interceptor VTR250 was sold only in the United States from 1988 to 1990, with moderate changes occurring over the three model years. With a 249 cc (15.2 cu in) four-stroke liquid-cooled DOHC V-twin engine and a six-speed transmission, VTR250 was the smallest of Honda's Interceptor line of motorcycles.

The 1990 model had a 17-inch front wheel and the front disc brakes were external.

== Specifications ==
All specifications are manufacturer claimed as per specific model owners manuals and workshop service manuals, except as stated,

Year	1982–83	1984–85	1985	1986	1987–89	1989	1997–99	2000–2002	2003–2008	2009-
Model	VT250-FII (VT250F)	VT250-FII (VT250Z H/J/K); MC15	VT 250-FII (Integra)	VT250F special edition/F2H (VTR250 Interceptor); MC15		Spada VT250L; MC20	VTR250 (VTR250W); MC33	VTR250 (VTR250Y); MC33	VTR250 (VTR2503); MC33	VTR250 (EFI); MC33
Engine Type / Configuration	Liquid cooled, 4-stroke, petrol, DOHC, V-Twin						4-stroke - 8-valve Liquid-cooled; DOHC 90°V-twin			4-stroke - 8-valve Liquid-cooled EFI; DOHC 90°V-twin
Body type	Fully faired & naked	Semi-naked & naked	Fully faired			Naked				
Displacement	248 cc (15.1 cu in)			249 cc (15.2 cu in)						250 cc (15 cu in).26
Bore and Stroke	60 mm × 44 mm (2.4 in × 1.7 in)			60 mm × 44.2 mm (2.36 in × 1.74 in)		60 mm × 44.1 mm (2.36 in × 1.74 in)	60 mm × 44 mm (2.4 in × 1.7 in)			60 mm × 44.2 mm (2.36 in × 1.74 in)
No. of cylinders	2 (V-twin)									
No. of valves	8 (4 per cylinder)									
Compression Ratio	11.0:1									
Ignition / Starting	Transistorized / electric						Full transistor / electric firing			Computer-controlled fully transistorised with electronic advance / electric
Fuel delivery	2x 32mm Keihin carburettors					2x 32mm Keihin VD10F	2x 32mm VD10 carburettors			Honda PGM-FI fuel injection system
Transmission	6-Speed, constant mesh, chain and sprockets final drive						5-Speed, constant mesh, chain and sprockets final drive			
Rake / trail	26°70' / 91 mm (3.6 in)	26°30' / 97 mm (3.8 in)		26°05' / 100 mm (3.9 in)		25° / 96 mm (3.8 in)	25°30' / 98 mm (3.9 in)			25°30' / 96 mm (3.8 in)
Front suspension	Air-assisted telescopic		Air assisted Telescopic with anti- dive adjustment	Showa 35mm Telescopic, 130mm travel		37mm telescopic, 120mm travel	Showa 41mm telescopic			Showa 41mm telescopic
Rear suspension	Pro-link air assisted monoshock			Monoshock, 100mm travel		Monoshock with 7-step preload adjustment	Monoshock with preload adjustment			Monoshock with preload adjustment.
Front brakes	in-board disc brake		Single disk, 2-piston calliper	drum	Single disk, 2-piston calliper		296mm single disc, 2-piston caliper			
Rear brakes	drum					single disk				
Front tyre	100/90-16 54S					100/80-17 52S	110/70-17 54H			
Rear tyre	110/80-18 58S	120/80-17 61S				140/70-17 66S	140/70-17 66H			
Fuel capacity (total)	12 L (2.6 imp gal; 3.2 US gal)	14 L (3.1 imp gal; 3.7 US gal)		13 L (2.9 imp gal; 3.4 US gal)		11 L (2.4 imp gal; 2.9 US gal)	13 L (2.9 imp gal; 3.4 US gal)			12 L (2.6 imp gal; 3.2 US gal)
Oil capacity	2.5 L (0.55 imp gal; 0.66 US gal)						2.4 L (0.53 imp gal; 0.63 US gal)			
Length	2,027 mm (79.8 in)	2,028 mm (79.8 in)		2,030 mm (80 in)		2,010 mm (79 in)	2,040 mm (80 in)			2,080 mm (82 in)
Width	750 mm (30 in)	730 mm (29 in)		715 mm (28.1 in)			720 mm (28 in)			715 mm (28.1 in)
Height	1,190 mm (47 in)	1,185 mm (46.7 in)		1,140 mm (45 in)		1,020 mm (40 in)	1,050 mm (41 in)			1,055 mm (41.5 in)
Wheelbase	1,385 mm (54.5 in)			1,370 mm (54 in)		1,380 mm (54 in)	1,410 mm (56 in)			1,405 mm (55.3 in)
Seat height							760 mm (30 in)			
Ground clearance				140 mm (5.5 in)		150 mm (5.9 in)	170 mm (6.7 in)			
Turning ratio							2.7 m (8 ft 10 in)			
