= Honda VT250F =

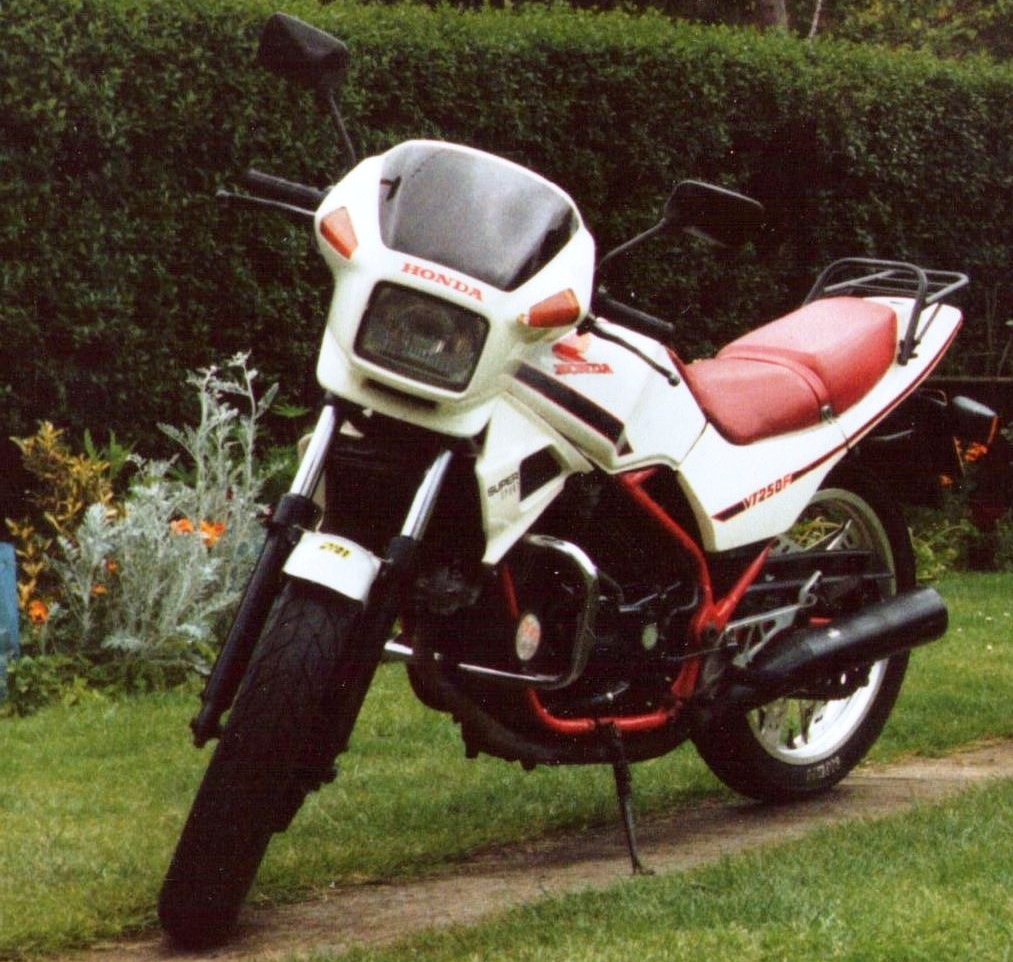
- Manufacturer: Honda

The Honda VT250F Integra is a semi-faired, sport bike first produced by Honda in 1982.

The VT250F had a DOHC 4-valve-per-cylinder, 90-degree water-cooled V-twin engine, which significantly reduced primary vibration when compared to inline twin engines used on similar machines. The V-twin engine also allowed the motorcycle to have a low centre of gravity and a low seat height.

The front brake system was a single inboard ventilated disc that was developed to improve brake performance and feel. This was only seen on Honda models for a few years, before a switch to sintered metal brake pads with the more traditional disc/caliper arrangement. Other features included a hydraulic clutch, Comstar wheels with tubeless tyres, TRAC anti-dive front forks and Pro-Link rear suspension. Engine coolant passed through one of the frame tubes. The early UK specification model had built-in front fairing indicators, and optional radiator side-cowls and belly pan. Following the VT250F, the VT250 Spada and VTR250 were produced. A full fairing VT250F2 was also produced to help the rider from being fatigue at high speeds it also featured double row cam chains. Later models also came with an aluminium box frame. The engine redlined at 13500 rpm. The engine also tends to heat up causing severe damage to the crankshaft bearings. It is advised to use only 10W/40 engine oil for v-twins and v-four engine motorcycles.

== Specifications ==
Engine	Two-cylinder 90° V Twin, Four-stroke
Displacement	248 cc
Bore & Stroke	60 mm x 44 mm
Valvetrain	DOHC, 4 valves per cylinder
Compression ratio	11:1
Maximum power	26.1 kW (35 hp) @ 11,000 rpm
Maximum torque	21.5 N⋅m (15.9 lb⋅ft) @ 10,000 rpm
Starter	Electric
Cooling system	Liquid-cooled
Transmission	Six speed
Drivetrain	Chain
Seat Height	780 mm (30.7 inch)
Fuel capacity	12 litres
Brakes	Front: single inboard disc Rear: drum
Dry weight	149 kg (328.5 lb)

== See also ==
- List of Honda motorcycles
