= Honda VTR250 =

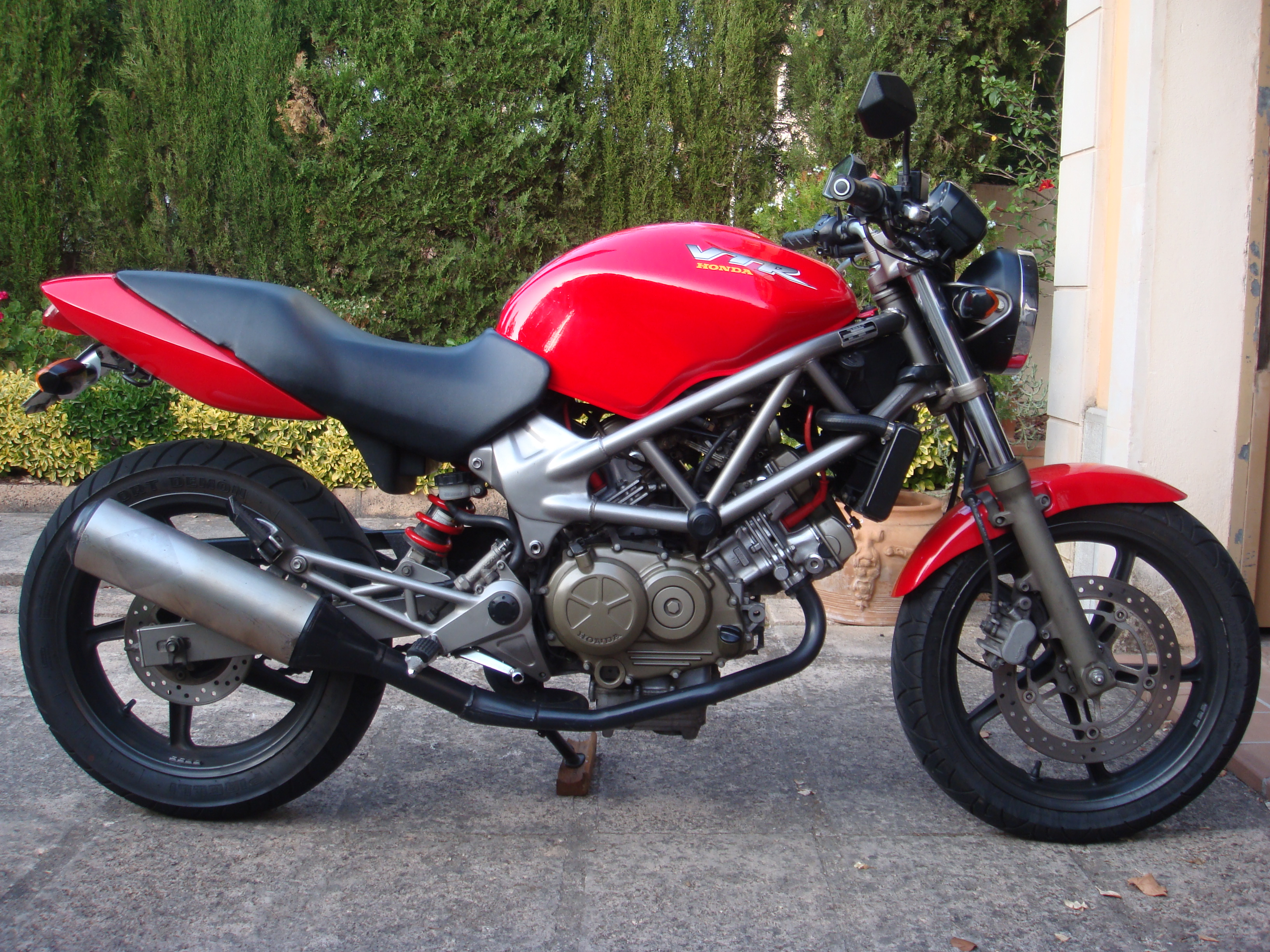
- Manufacturer: Honda
- Also called: Honda Interceptor 250
- Production: 1988–1990; 1997–2018
- Predecessor: Honda VT250 Spada
- Class: Naked bike
- Engine: 249 cc (15.2 cu in) four-stroke, DOHC 8-valve, 90° V-twin
- Bore / stroke: 60 mm × 44 mm (2.4 in × 1.7 in)
- Compression ratio: 11:1
- Transmission: Wet multi-plate clutch, 5-speed, chain drive
- Suspension: 41 mm showa telescopic fork (front), direct-link monoshock with preload adjustment (rear)
- Brakes: Single 296 mm disc, 2 piston caliper (front), single 220 mm disc, 1 piston caliper (rear)
- Rake, trail: 25°30', 96 mm (3.8 in)
- Wheelbase: 1,405 mm (55.3 in)
- Dimensions: L: 2,040 mm (80 in); W: 720 mm (28 in); H: 1,050 mm (41 in)
- Seat height: 760 mm (30 in)
- Fuel capacity: 13 L (2.9 imp gal; 3.4 US gal)
- Oil capacity: 2.4 L (0.53 imp gal; 0.63 US gal)
- Turning radius: 2.7 m (8 ft 10 in)

The Honda VTR250 is a 90° V-twin motorcycle produced by Honda that has had one major revision. The original VTR250 was a faired sport bike sold only in the United States and Canada from 1988 to 1990. The next VTR250 model is a naked bike, produced from 1997 to 2018, available only in the Asia-Pacific region, and for 2009, Europe.

== 1988–1990 ==
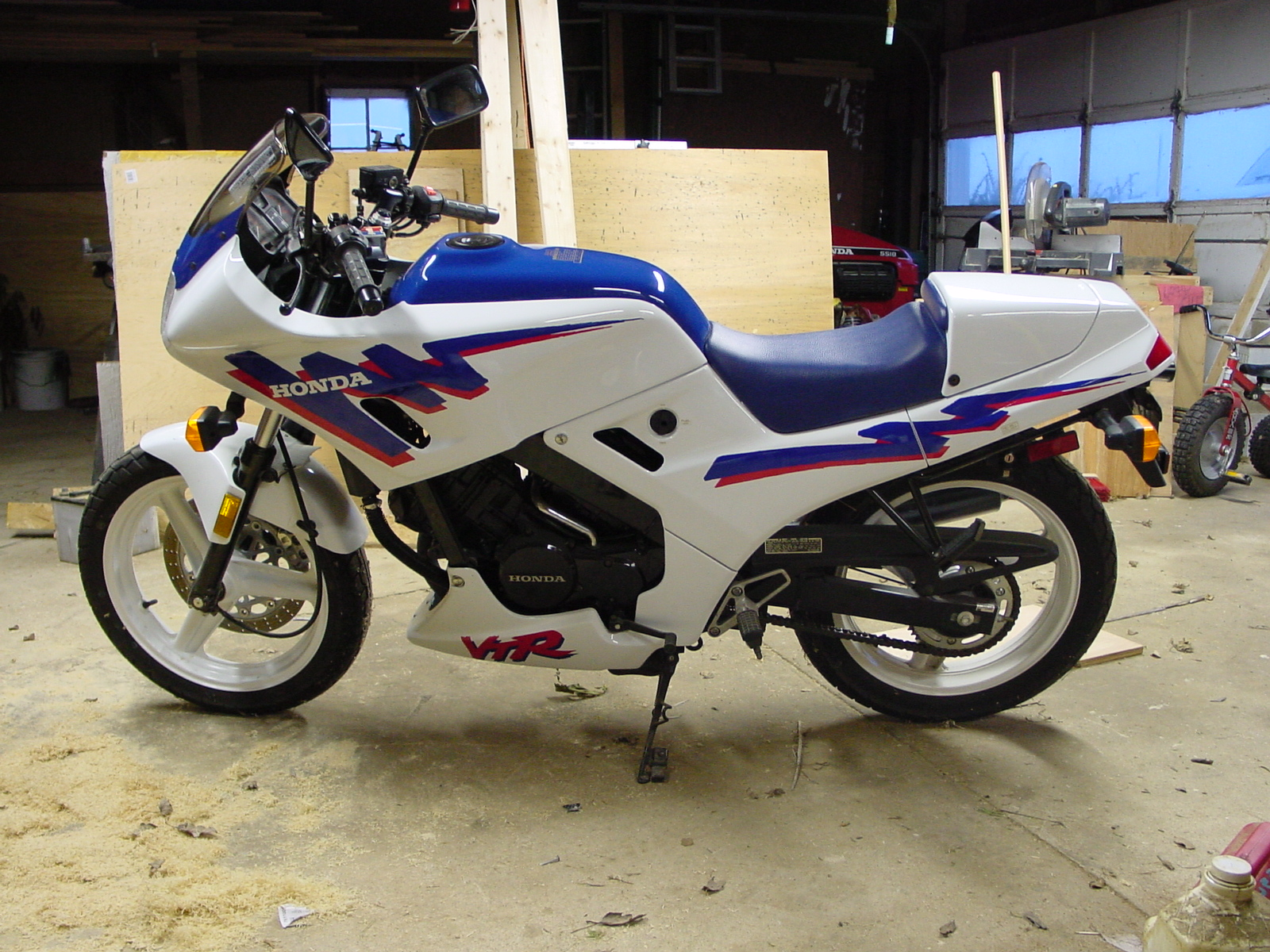
1990 Honda VTR250

The Honda Interceptor VTR250 was sold only in the United States from 1988 to 1990, with moderate changes occurring over the three model years. With a 249 cc (15.2 cu in) four-stroke liquid-cooled DOHC V-twin engine and a six-speed transmission, VTR250 was the smallest of Honda's Interceptor line of motorcycles.

The 1990 model had a 17-inch front wheel and the front disc brakes were external.

== 1997–2018 ==
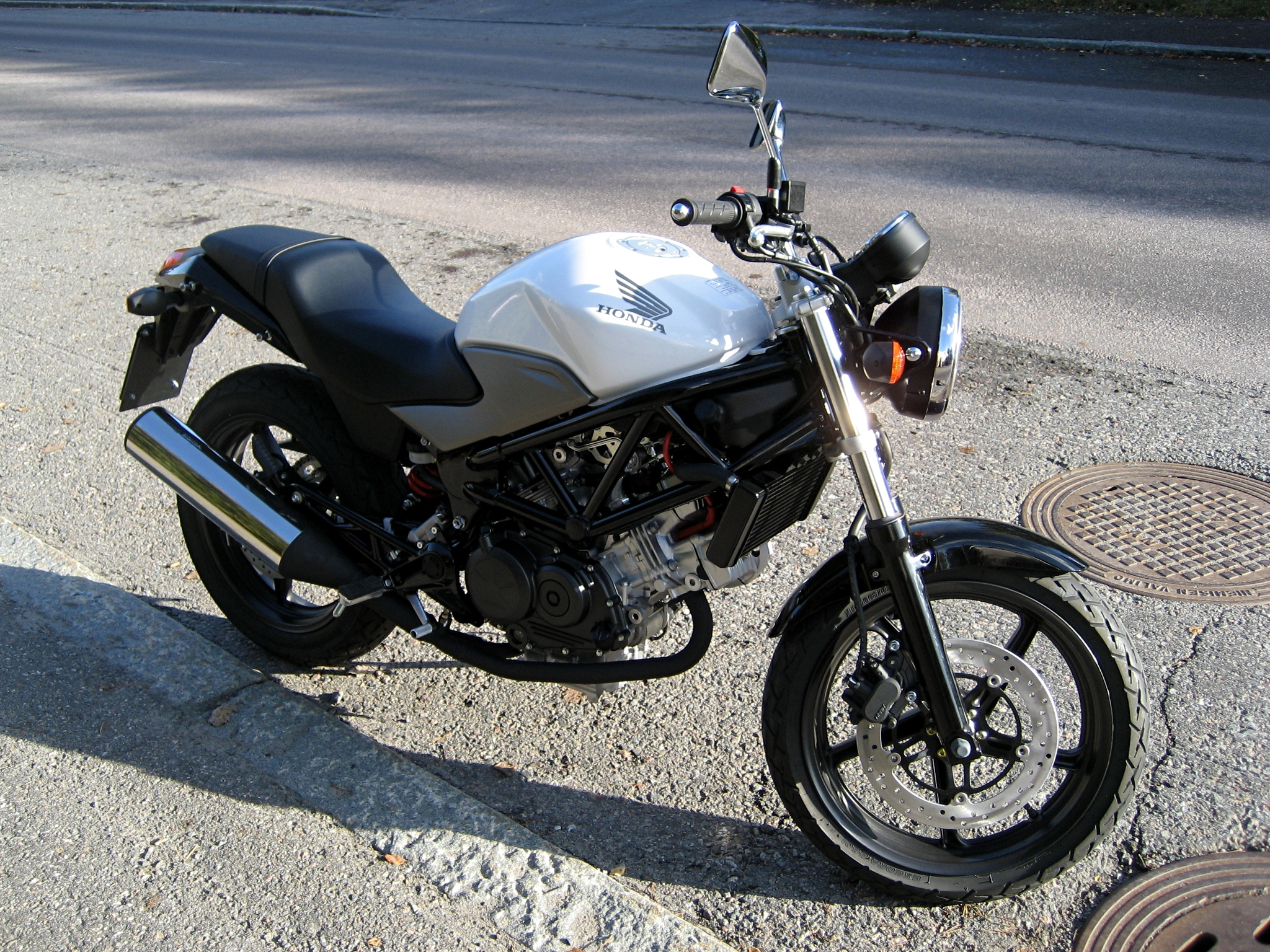
2009 Honda VTR250

Introduced in 1997, the newer VTR250 has been compared to the Ducati Monster in appearance, with a trellis frame, V-twin engine, and initially a similar instrument layout, with no tachometer. The transmission was changed from six-speeds to five. In 2003, the instrument panel was updated to include a tachometer on the right side and move the warning lights and indicator-on to below both analogue displays. The 2009 model VTR250 saw the first major design changes since the instrument panel update. With a redesigned rear end and midsection, the 2009 model also has electronic fuel injection.

The VTR250 is widely sold in the Asia Pacific region but not in the US. The 2009 model VTR250 was imported to Europe. It was officially imported into Australia between 1998 and 2007, with the 2009 model being reintroduced mid-2009.

== Specifications ==
All specifications are manufacturer claimed as per specific model owners manuals and workshop service manuals, except as stated.

Year	1982–83	1984–85	1985	1986	1987–89	1989	1997–99	2000–2002	2003–2008	2009–
Model	VT250-FII (VT250F)MC08	VT 250-FII (Integra)	VT250F special edition (VTR250 Interceptor); MC15			Spada VT250L; MC20	VTR250 (VTR250W); MC33	VTR250 (VTR250Y); MC33	VTR250 (VTR2503); MC33	VTR250 (EFI); MC33
Engine Type / Configuration	Liquid cooled, 4-stroke, petrol, DOHC, V-Twin						4-stroke - 8-valve Liquid-cooled; DOHC 90°V-twin			4-stroke - 8-valve Liquid-cooled EFI; DOHC 90°V-twin
Body type	Fully faired & naked	Semi-naked & naked	Fully faired			Naked				
Displacement	247.81 cc (15.122 cu in)			249.95 cc (15.253 cu in)		249.34 cc (15.216 cu in)	247.81 cc (15.122 cu in)			249.95 cc (15.253 cu in)
Bore and Stroke	60 mm × 44 mm (2.4 in × 1.7 in)			60 mm × 44.2 mm (2.36 in × 1.74 in)		60 mm × 44.1 mm (2.36 in × 1.74 in)	60 mm × 44 mm (2.4 in × 1.7 in)			60 mm × 44.2 mm (2.36 in × 1.74 in)
No. of cylinders	2 (V-twin)									
No. of valves	8 (4 per cylinder)									
Compression Ratio	11.0:1									
Ignition/starting	Transistorized/electric						Full transistor/electric firing			Computer-controlled fully transistorised with electronic advance/electric
Fuel Delivery	2x 32 mm Keihin carburettors					2x 32mm Keihin VD10F	2x 32 mm VD10 carburettors			Honda PGM-FI fuel injection system
Transmission	6-Speed, constant mesh, chain and sprockets final drive						5-Speed, constant mesh, chain and sprockets final drive			
Primary reduction ratio	2.821									
1st gear ratio	2.562 (41/16)					2.733 (41/15)				
2nd gear ratio	1.850 (37/20)					2.000 (38/19)	1.800			
3rd gear ratio	1.478 (34/23)					1.590 (35/22)	1.375			
4th gear ratio	1.240 (31/25)					1.333 (32/24)	1.111			
5th gear ratio	1.074 (29/27)					1.153 (30/26)	0.965			
6th gear ratio	0.965 (28/29)					1.035 (29/28)	na (no 6th gear)			
Final reduction ratio	3.214					3.176	2.928			
Front sprocket				14T		17T	14T			
Rear sprocket				45T		54T,51T	41T			
Chain type	520 -104links o ring						520 O-ring			
Rake, trail	26°70', 91 mm (3.6 in)	26°30', 97 mm (3.8 in)		26°05', 100 mm (3.9 in)		25° / 96 mm (3.8 in)	25°30', 98 mm (3.9 in)			25°30' / 96 mm (3.8 in)
Front suspension	Air-assisted telescopic		Air assisted Telescopic with anti- dive adjustment	Showa 35mm Telescopic, 130mm travel		37mm telescopic, 120mm travel	Showa 41mm telescopic			
Rear suspension	Pro-link air assisted monoshock			Monoshock with preload adjustment						
Front brakes	Single cast iron ring disc mounted in wheel hub with brake caliper on inner periphery		Single or Twin disc, 2-piston calliper	drum	Single disc, 2-piston calliper		296mm single disc, 2-piston caliper			
Rear brake	drum					single disc				
Front tyre	100/90-16 54S					100/80-17 52S	110/70-17 54H			
Rear tyre	110/80-18 58S	120/80-17 61S				140/70-17 66S	140/70-17 66H			
Fuel capacity (total)	12 L (2.6 imp gal; 3.2 US gal)	14 L (3.1 imp gal; 3.7 US gal)		13 L (2.9 imp gal; 3.4 US gal)		11 L (2.4 imp gal; 2.9 US gal)	13 L (2.9 imp gal; 3.4 US gal)			12 L (2.6 imp gal; 3.2 US gal)
Reserve fuel	2.5 L (0.55 imp gal; 0.66 US gal)	2.5 L (0.55 imp gal; 0.66 US gal)		2.2 L (0.48 imp gal; 0.58 US gal)		1.9 L (0.42 imp gal; 0.50 US gal)				1.5 L (0.33 imp gal; 0.40 US gal)
Oil capacity	2.5 L (0.55 imp gal; 0.66 US gal)						2.4 L (0.53 imp gal; 0.63 US gal)			
Length	2,027 mm (79.8 in)	2,028 mm (79.8 in)		2,030 mm (80 in)		2,010 mm (79 in)	2,040 mm (80 in)			2,080 mm (82 in)
Width	750 mm (30 in)	730 mm (29 in)		715 mm (28.1 in)			720 mm (28 in)			715 mm (28.1 in)
Height	1,190 mm (47 in)	1,185 mm (46.7 in)		1,140 mm (45 in)		1,020 mm (40 in)	1,050 mm (41 in)			1,055 mm (41.5 in)
Wheelbase	1,385 mm (54.5 in)			1,370 mm (54 in)		1,380 mm (54 in)	1,410 mm (56 in)			1,405 mm (55.3 in)
Seat height	29 in						760 mm (30 in)			
Ground clearance				140 mm (5.5 in)		150 mm (5.9 in)	170 mm (6.7 in)			
Turning ratio							2.7 m (8 ft 10 in)			
Fuel economy							40 km/L (110 mpg_{‑imp}; 94 mpg_{‑US})			
Market availability				USA		Japan and Australia				
