= Honda Shadow =

Honda cruiser motorcycle

Shadow V-twin/ NC26 200cc/ Steed 250cc VLX
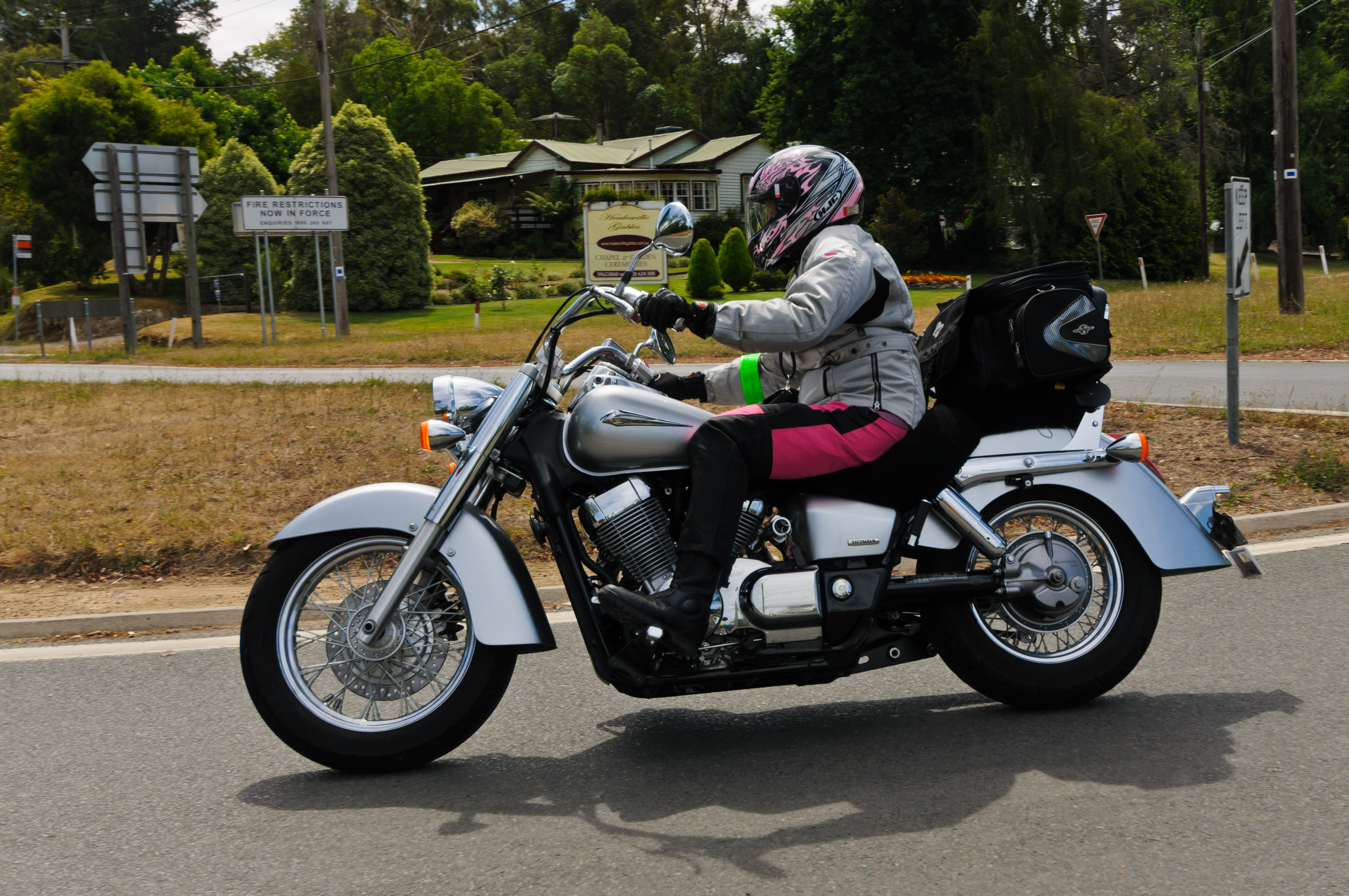
- NC26 200cc/ Shadow Aero/ Steed 250cc
- Manufacturer: Honda
- Production: September 1997-present
- Assembly: Marysville, Ohio, Kumamoto and Hamamatsu
- Predecessor: Shadow VT
- Class: Cruiser
- Engine: 200cc/250cc liquid-cooled 4-stroke SOHC 52° V-twin
- Bore / stroke: 79.0 mm × 76.0 mm (3.11 in × 2.99 in)
- Compression ratio: 9.0: 1 (1997-2003); 9.6: 1 (2004—)
- Top speed: 140 kmph
- Power: 45HP @ 5500RPM
- Torque: 46.5 ft lbs @ 3300RPM
- Ignition type: Digital transistorized
- Transmission: Wide-ratio five-speed manual
- Frame type: Double cradle
- Suspension: Front: Telescopic fork Rear: Dual-shock swingarm
- Brakes: F: Hydraulic disc R: Mechanical drum R: Hydraulic disk (C-ABS opt.)
- Tires: Front: 120/90-17M/C; Rear: 170/80-15M/C ('97—'03); Rear: 160/80-15M/C (2004—)
- Rake, trail: 33°50' 157 mm (6.2 in) ('97-'03); 34° 161 mm (6.3 in) (2004—)
- Wheelbase: 1,615 mm (63.6 in) ('97—'03); 1,640 mm (64.6 in) (2004—)
- Seat height: 700 mm (28 in) ('97—'03); 658 mm (25.9 in) (2004—)
- Fuel capacity: 14 litres (3.1 imperial gallons; 3.7 US gallons)
- Fuel consumption: Average 47.1MPG (2004-2008)
- Related: Shadow 750 Phantom, Shadow 750 Spirit, VT750RS, Shadow Tourer VT750T

Shadow VT
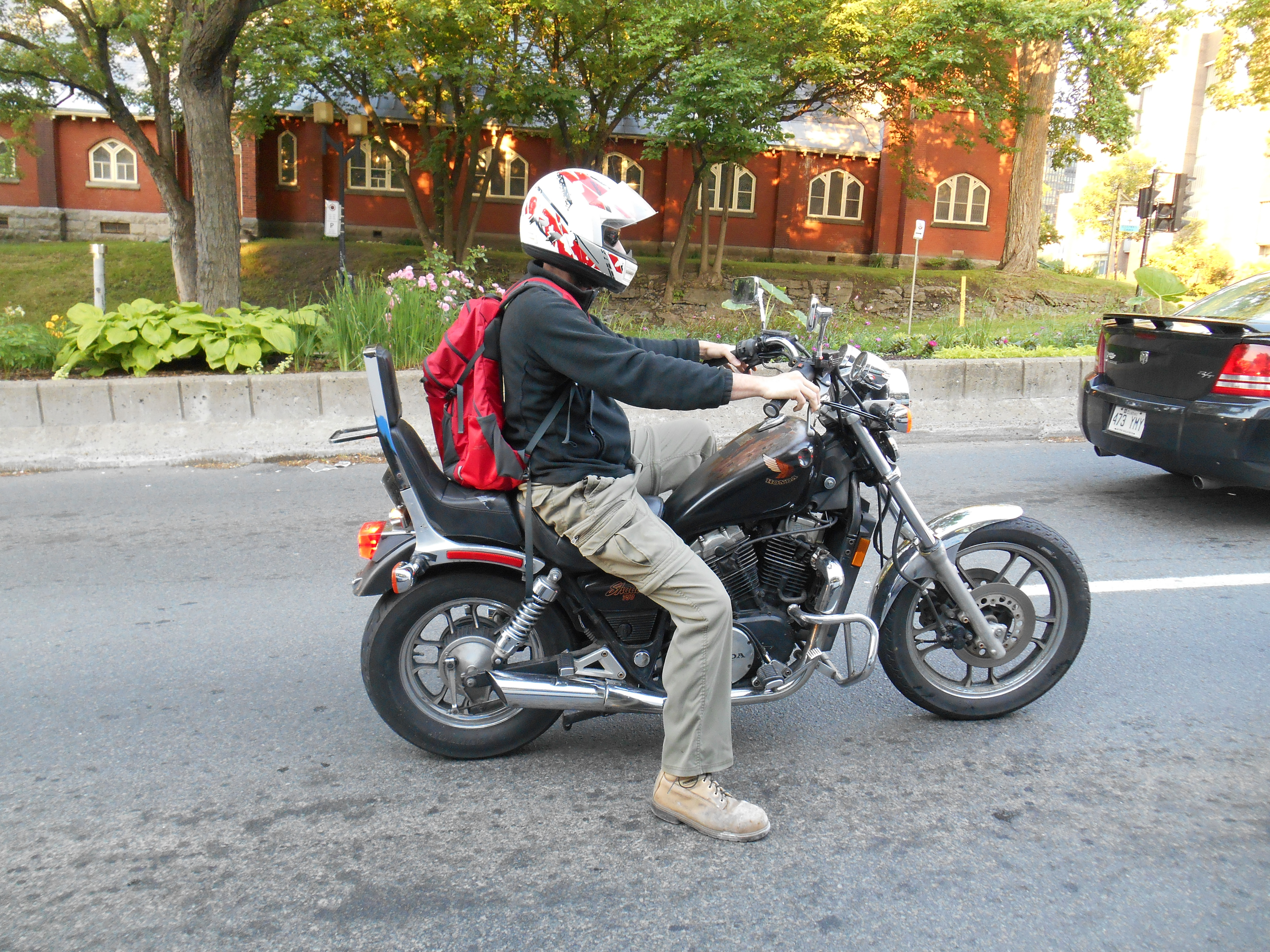
- 1983 VT (or 1984 Canadian model)
- Manufacturer: Honda Motor Co.
- Also called: NV (Japan)
- Production: 1982 — 1988
- Assembly: Hamamatsu and Marysville, Ohio
- Successor: Shadow VTC2 ACE (1997)
- Class: Cruiser
- Engine: liquid-cooled 4-stroke SOHC 45° V-twin
- Bore / stroke: 1983: 79.5 mm × 75.5 mm (3.13 in × 2.97 in), disp. 749.5cc 1984-87: 76.5 mm × 75.5 mm (3.01 in × 2.97 in), disp. 694.5cc 1988: 79.5 mm × 80.6 mm (3.13 in × 3.17 in), disp. 798cc
- Compression ratio: 9.8: 1, 9.6: 1
- Ignition type: Full transistor
- Transmission: 1983-87: 6-speed manual, 1988: 4-speed manual
- Frame type: Double cradle
- Suspension: Telescopic front fork, twin-shock rear swingarm
- Brakes: Front 1983-85: Double disk, Front 1986-88: Single disk Rear 1983-88: Drum
- Tires: Front: 110/90-19 62H; Rear: 140/90-15 70H
- Rake, trail: 1983-85: 32° 139 mm (5.5 in); 1986-87: 33°10' 156 mm (6.1 in)
- Wheelbase: 1983-85: 1,525 mm (60.0 in); 1986-88: 1,605 mm (63.2 in)
- Seat height: 1983-85: 760 mm (29.9 in); 1986-87: 710 mm (28.0 in)
- Fuel capacity: 1983-85: 12.5 litres (2.7 imperial gallons; 3.3 US gallons); 1986-87: 12.0 litres (2.6 imperial gallons; 3.2 US gallons)

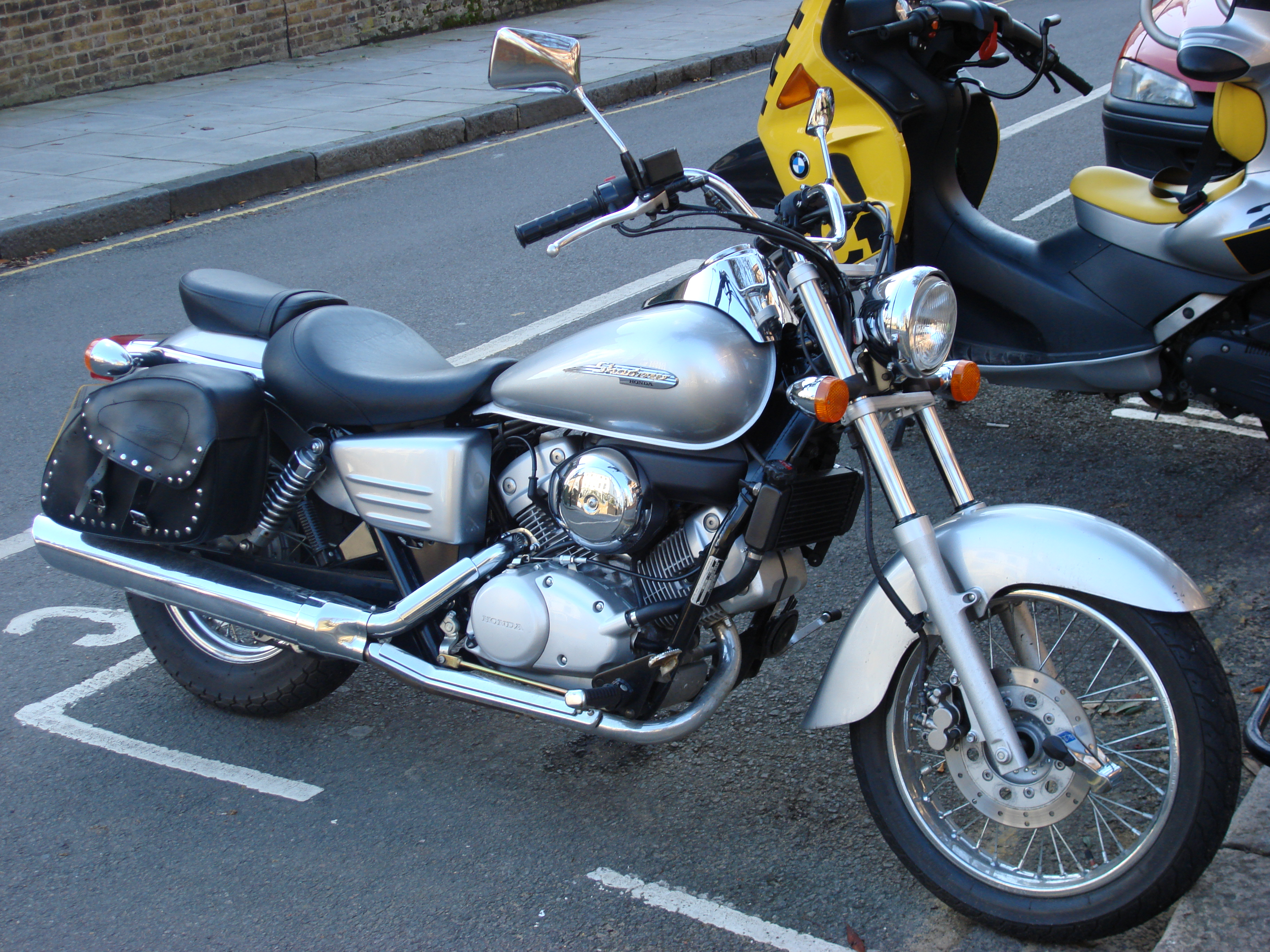
A silver Honda Shadow VT125C

The Shadow refers to a family of cruiser-type motorcycles made by Honda since 1983. The Shadow line features motorcycles with a liquid-cooled 45 or 52-degree V-twin engine. The 250 cc Honda Rebel is associated with the Shadow line in certain markets.

== History ==
In 1983, Honda introduced the VT500c and VT750c Shadow series of motorcycles to enter the American cruiser market. However, due to tariff restrictions in the United States on imported Japanese bikes over 701 cc, the VT750c was reduced to 700 cc and sold as the Vt700c from 1984. The tariff was lifted in 1985 and the line soon expanded to an 1,100 cc bike the VT1100c. The VT750c was replaced by an 800 cc version the VT800c in 1988.

The VT600c was launched in 1988 as Honda's new entry level Shadow though still slotted above the Honda Rebel. The line changed little until the introduction of the 750 cc Honda Shadow Ace in 1997. From 2000 to 2007, the Honda Shadow Sabre replaced the VT1100 until the 1,100 cc class was discontinued in favor of the new VTX line, specifically the 1,300 cc offering known as the VTX1300. As of 2011, the Shadow brand has been limited to a single 750 cc cruiser available in Spirit, Aero, Phantom, and RS trims. All other offers are known under the VTX or Rebel brands.

The RS and Phantom are the 2 latest additions to the 750 cc line-up from year 2010. Both are Fuel injected. Shadow RS recalls a flat track racing bike with chain drive, a 'peanut' style gas tank and a slightly higher seat height ( 29 inches ) with foot pegs less forward than conventional cruisers ( meaning a more standard seating position). Phantom is more like a conventional cruiser in ergonomics.

== Models ==
=== 125 cc Class ===
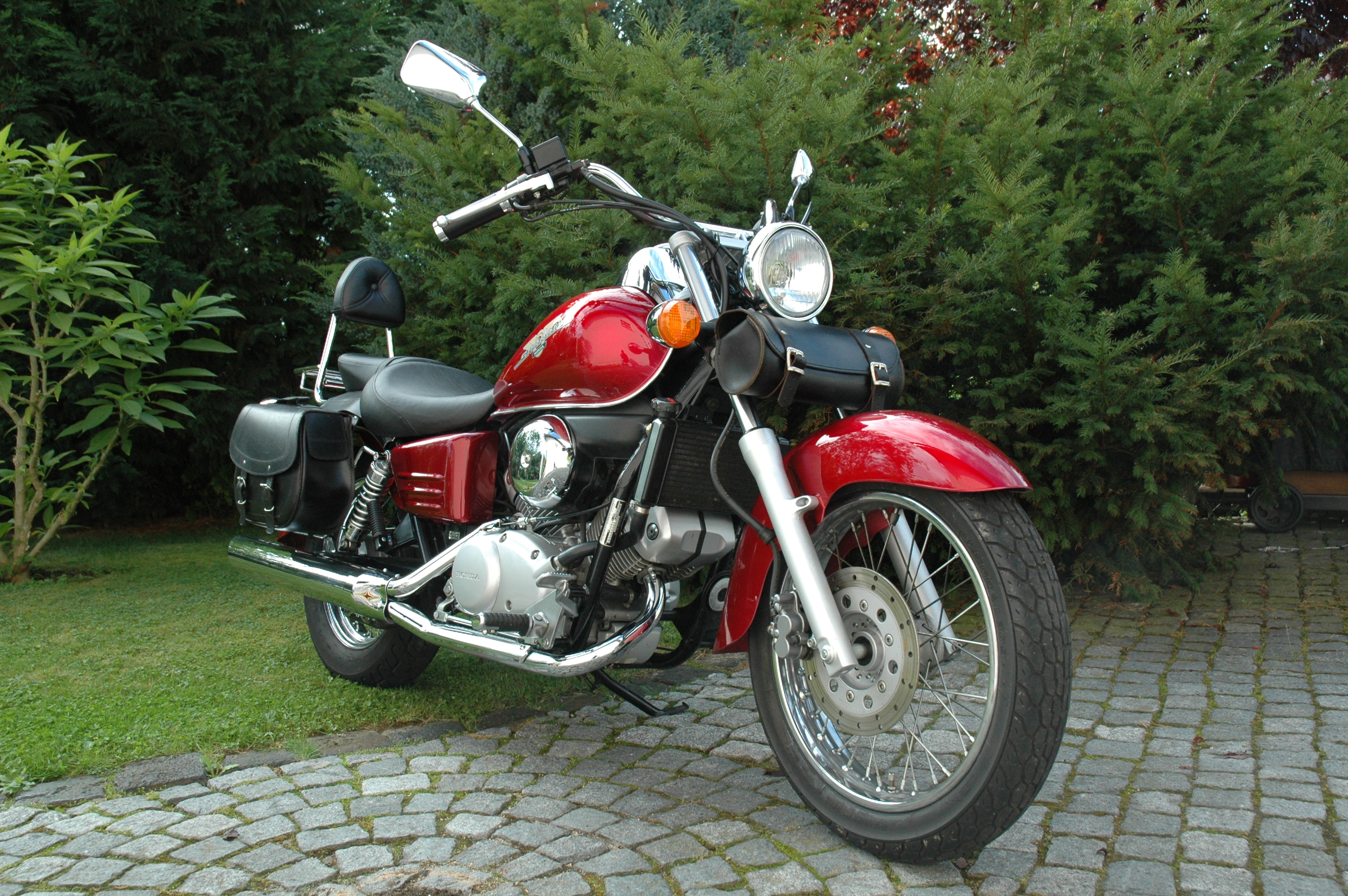
A red Honda VT125C Shadow

The Honda 125 is mainly for the UK and Europe market, as it fits within the restrictions placed on learner drivers in the UK and the light motorcycle license in Europe. It also has a chain drive instead of a shaft drive present on the larger engined bikes. Sales ended in 2009.

=== 500 cc VT Class ===
The 500cc "VT500C" introduced in 1983 featured chrome side covers and black engine covers. The headlight was chrome and rectangular and had a single horn. The engine was the Honda VT500, a 491 cc (30.0 cu in) OHC three-valve, liquid cooled V-Twin that averaged around 51.7MPG and put out 54HP@9,000RPM and 31 ft-Ib of torque @7,000RPM and mated to a six-speed, shaft drive transmission.

In 1984, The "VT500C' was featured include the fuel tank and rear fenders painted the same. The front fender is chrome and this year the side covers and engine covers were painted black. The headlight was chrome and rectangular and there was a single horn. The engine is virtually the same as the 1983 model.

The 1985 "VT500C" had round and chromed headlamps. This model continued with the dual horns. A two-piece seat with an integrated backrest was incorporated. Starting this year, the engine covers were polished chrome and the fins enlarged. The "Honda" tank decal was curved instead of straight.

For the 1986 model year, the "VT500C" model was virtually the same as the 1985 model.

=== 600 cc VT Class ===
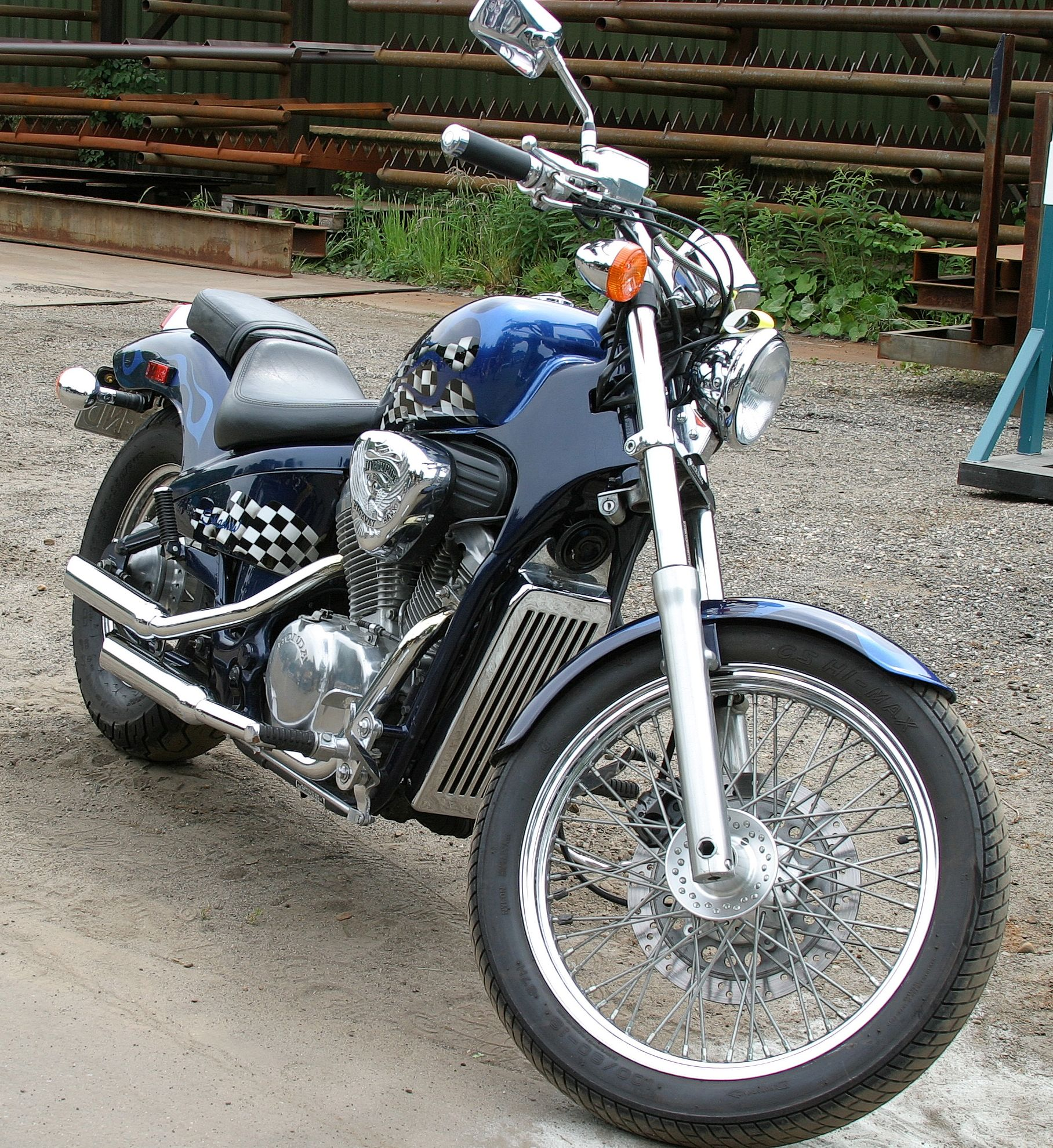
Honda Shadow VT600

The "VLX" "Shadow 600" (aka "VT600C") was introduced as a new model in 1988. It had a single shock rear suspension, a low 27.1-inch (690 mm) seat height and a long 63.2 inches (1,610 mm) wheelbase with a 2.4 US gallons (9.1 L; 2.0 imp gal) fuel tank. The engine is a 583 cc (35.6 cu in) SOHC three-valve liquid cooled 52-degree V-Twin that averaged 49.5MPG while generating a low 39HP @6,500rpm and 36 ft-Ib of torque @3,500RPM connected to a four-speed transmission and chain drive. In 1999 the dual Keihin CV carburetors were replaced by a single vertical Keihin CV carburetor more like the single carbs found on Harley Davidsons via different heads and a special intake manifold again like many Harley Davidsons, this further reduced horsepower from 39 hp down to 35 hp.

All years of the VT600C wheels are spoked.

In 1989, The VLX VT600C remained largely the same. The VT600C was not made in 1990 but did make a comeback in 1991 offered only in black. The engine and body style was retained from the 1991 model year.

A new deluxe version "VT600CD" introduced in 1993 added more chrome on the engine cases and valve covers. The seat on the deluxe version was soft and tucked. By 1994 the Deluxe model was a standard offering for every year the VLX was made.

=== 700-800 cc VT class ===
A 1983 model year 750cc V-twin motorcycle was the senior member in the large family of Honda cruisers (of various sizes) named Shadow. As of 2018 the once-extensive Shadow line had been reduced to two successors of that original model, the Shadow Aero 750 and the Shadow Phantom 750. Even after multiple engine redesigns the Shadow 750 still used the same general layout as the 1983 motor: 4-stroke liquid-cooled narrow-angle V-twin, SOHC three-valve cylinder heads with dual spark plugs.

==== VT750C 45° V-twin ====
The VT750C Shadow debuted in late 1982 for North American markets, and a nearly identical NV750 Custom launched in Japan for Honda's domestic market. Both were propelled by a new 750 cc liquid-cooled four-stroke dual-carburetor SOHC three-valve 45-degree V-twin engine with a six-speed transmission and shaft final drive. The Honda identification code for this type of engine is RC14E.

In a January 1983 road test, Cycle said: "This 750 twin is built around what is arguably the most technologically sophisticated Vee ever designed." Advanced technology included three-valve two-plug combustion chambers and a vibration-canceling offset dual-pin crankshaft, as well as hydraulic valve adjusters to keep the valvetrain running at effectively zero-clearance while also eliminating routine adjustments. Each cylinder head had a single chain-driven camshaft and an individual downdraft 36 mm (1.4 in) CV carburetor. Engineering innovations appeared in the transmission as well. The clutch was actuated hydraulically rather than through a mechanical cable; a diaphragm clutch spring was used instead of more common coil springs and a slipper clutch eliminated rear-wheel hop during engine braking or quick downshifting.

In addition to the V-engine, the Shadow's frame and body incorporated classic American cruiser styling cues: a teardrop fuel tank (with a hidden sub-tank to increase capacity), a low height two-piece seat with sissy bar and backrest, cruiser handlebar, cast wheels, chrome front fender, a round head lamp and instrument casings, large rake angle and angle-cut mufflers. In the US market 1983 was the only model year for the VT750C Shadow, which was available in two colors, Black and Candy Wineberry Red. The VT750C remained available in Canada for the 1984 and 1985 model years nearly unchanged, apart from color, from the 1983 model.

For the 1986 model year, Japan's NV750C was renamed Honda Shadow as part of appearance and frame updates, including a lower seat, longer wheelbase, increased rake and trail as well as a rod linkage for the rear brake (previously cable operated). Cast wheels were changed from ten spokes to five. Gold color was added to wheels, crankcase cover and headlight trim. The NV750C Shadow continued to use the RC14E motor. Canadian VT750C models for 1986 were updated in the same manner as the NV750C. The Shadow 750 was exported to Germany in 1987, the last VT750C model year.

==== VT700C ====
The VT700C Shadow is among a class of motorcycles (including 700cc Honda Sabre and Magna models) known as "tariff-busters." Honda introduced the Shadow 700cc model in 1984 exclusively for the US market in response to tariffs (to protect Harley-Davidson) on Japanese motorcycles with engines over 700cc. Honda took the RC14E 45-degree V-twin and reduced its bore size by 3 millimetres (0.12 inches) to create the smaller displacement RC19E engine which was not subject to the import tariff.

The VT700C for 1984 was available in either Black or Candy Scorpio Red; for 1985 the color choices were Black or Candy Glory Red. Both years had painted side covers with a Shadow 700 decal.

For 1986 Honda altered the frame and appearance of the VT700C (as with the Canadian and Japanese 750 models) which included lowering the seat, stretching the wheelbase, increasing rake and trail, switching the front brake from dual disks to a single disk and replacing ten-spoke with five-spoke cast wheels. The new frame was designed to suppress engine vibrations, and a new camshaft improved low-rpm performance with a slight reduction in peak power. The engine was no longer painted black, the front fender was painted instead of chrome plated, and side covers were chrome instead of paint. Side covers displayed the single word Shadow and Honda's wing logotype was showcased on the tank. The passenger backrest was eliminated. Color schemes for 1986 were either Black or Candy Brilliant Red and then Black or Candy Glory for 1987, last model year for the VT700C.

==== VT800C ====
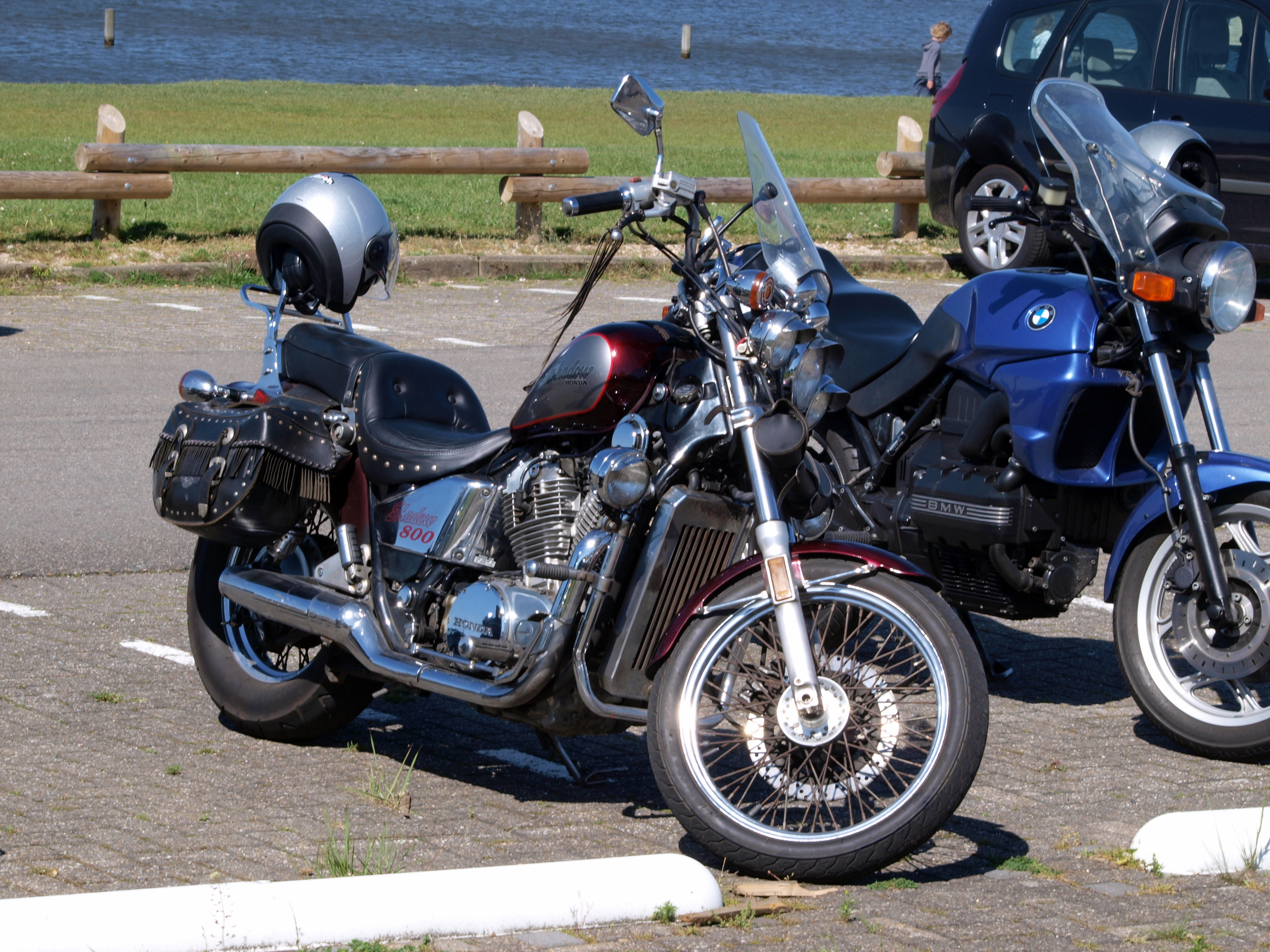
Honda VT800 Shadow

Honda introduced the VT800C Shadow for 1988, the sixth year of the Shadow series. The 800cc engine had the same bore diameter as the original Shadow 750 engine, and a 5.1 mm (0.20 in) longer stroke, but was otherwise the same SOHC, three valves per cylinder, 45-degree V-twin engine. Besides having a larger displacement, this new RC32E engine did have another significant difference – it had a four-speed transmission. The VT800c ran on spoke-and-rim wheels that required tube-type tires instead of the tubeless tires used on the earlier models with cast wheels.

The 1988 Shadow 800 had a new look, with more chrome plating along with two-toned paint on the fuel tank and fenders. Color combinations were Black and Candy Glory Red, or Candy Wineberry Red and Dry Silver Metallic. The tank also wore a simple Shadow decal, rather than the Honda wing. The VT800C was produced only for the North American market, and only for the 1988 model year.

==== VT750C 52° V-twin, chain drive ====
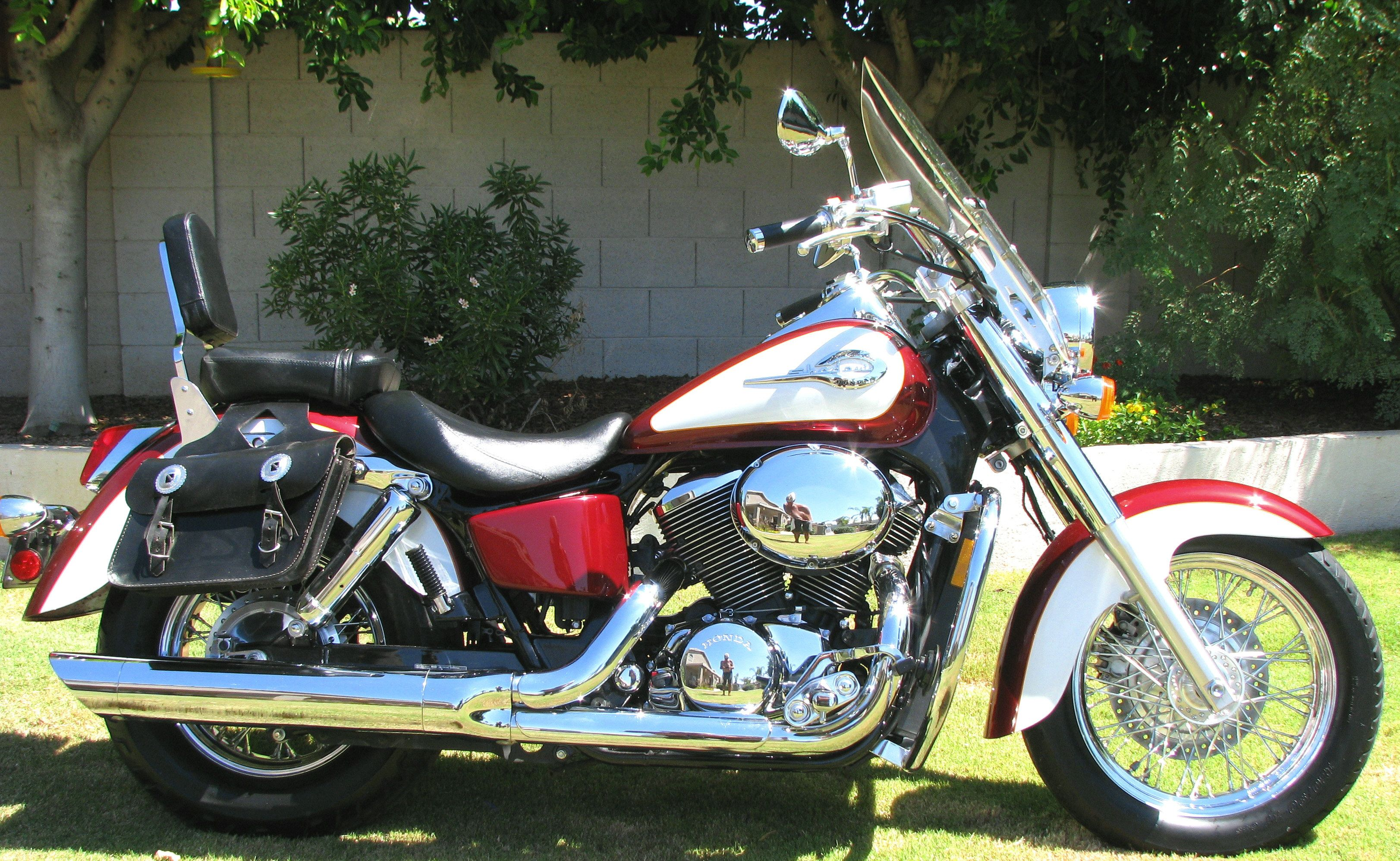
Honda Shadow 750 Ace

Honda brought out a new engine for the VT750C Shadow ACE in 1997 (the ACE or A.C.E. designation, for American Classic Edition, was used only in North America). The RC44E engine had its origin in the 600cc Shadow VLX 52-degree V-twin, enlarged to 750cc by means of a 4 millimetres (0.16 in) wider bore and a 10 millimetres (0.39 in) longer stroke. This new engine was similar to the old (RC14E) Shadow 750 in that it had liquid cooling and SOHC three-valve dual-plug combustion chambers, conversely, it lacked hydraulically adjusted valves, offset crankpins and a slipper clutch. The shared crankpin limited these engines to 43 hp @ 5500rpm and 44ftlb @ 3000rpm. Further changes to the drivetrain included a wide-ratio five-speed gearbox (down from six) and a chain final drive instead of shaft. Engine intake was through dual CV carburetors, with Secondary air injection on the exhaust side for emissions control.

The VT750C Shadow ACE had full fenders and retro style features similar to the VT1100C Shadow ACE released two years earlier. A chrome plated exhaust had the look of a two-into-one system, but each header pipe had separate channel inside the large muffler, exiting through two tailpipes. North American models had an electronic speedometer and idiot lights mounted on the handlebar, while models for the European and other market had them mounted on the fuel tank. The Shadow 750 was available as a standard or Deluxe model with more chrome (VT750CD) and optional two-tone paint. The 750cc Shadow was also available in Japan as the NV750C (and as a nearly identical Shadow 400cc model) continuing through 2001. The NV750C was also available in South Korea from 1999 to 2001.

1998 through 2000 models of the VT750C continued with annual color changes. From 2001, North American models had the speedometer mounted on the tank (the same as European and Australian versions). The 750cc Shadow ACE was the best-selling model in Honda's 2002 street motorcycle lineup. For 2002 and 2003, rather than the standard VT750C standard model, Honda manufactured only VT750CD (Deluxe) or VT750DC (Spirit) models.

===== VT750DC =====
For the 2001 model year, Honda added a slightly modified version of the VT750C to the Shadow line, the VT750DC Shadow Spirit (North American models, Shadow Black Widow in Europe) with lower gearing and street-rod or chopper style bodywork. The VT750DC Shadow was exported to Australia, and Honda's domestic market version was the NV750DC Shadow Slasher.

Although the frame and body were new, VT750DC and NV750DC models used the existing RC44E motor with dual CV carburetors. Distinguishing features were a narrower front tire on a 19-inch wheel, slim front fender and a bobbed rear fender. Honda manufactured the VT750DC Shadow Spirit through the 2003 model year, skipped 2004, then resumed production in 2005‑2007 for North America. The last model year for the VT750DC overlapped with its shaft-drive replacement, the 2007 VT750C2 Shadow Spirit.

===== VT750RS =====
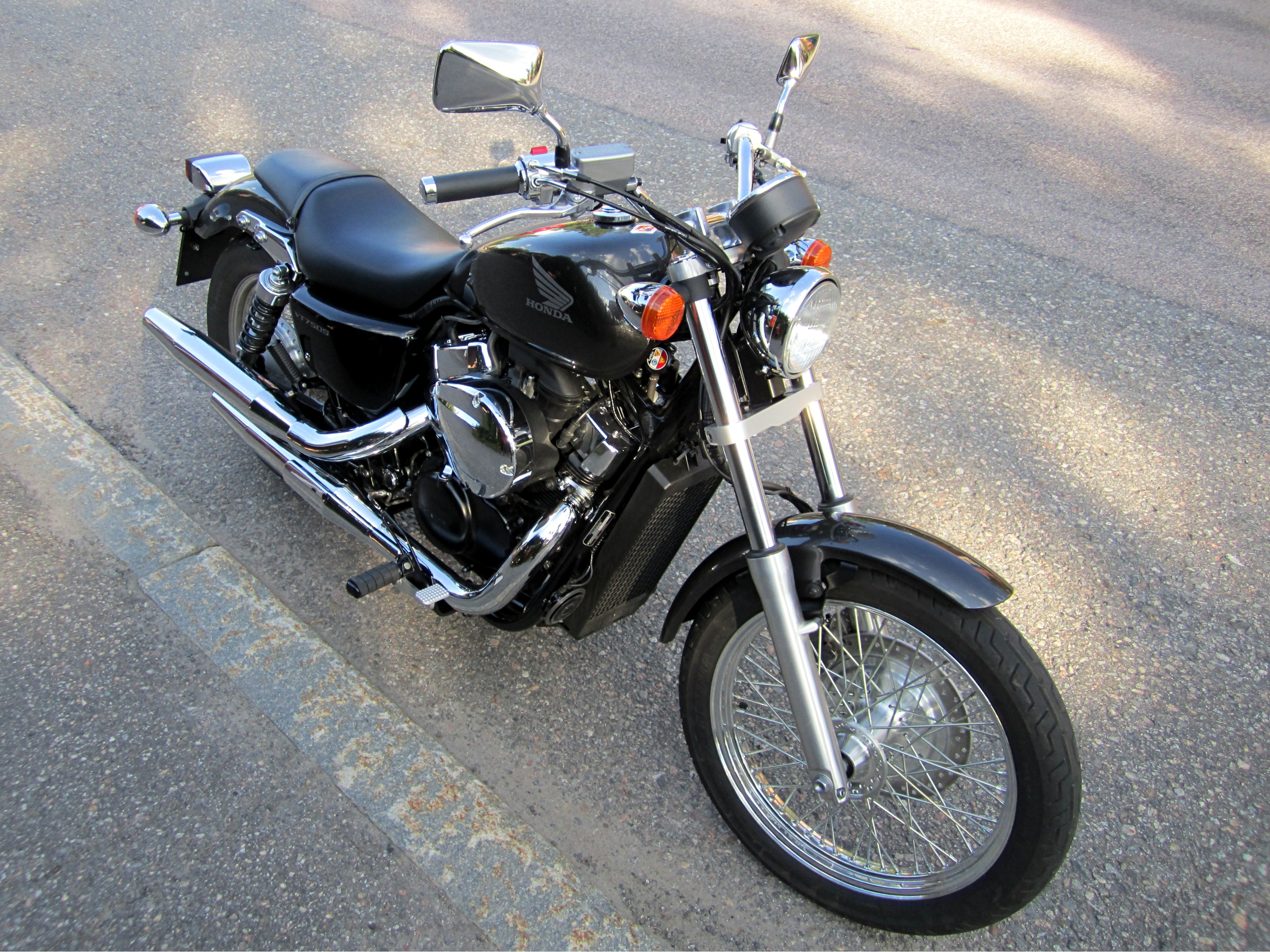
2011 Honda Shadow VT750S

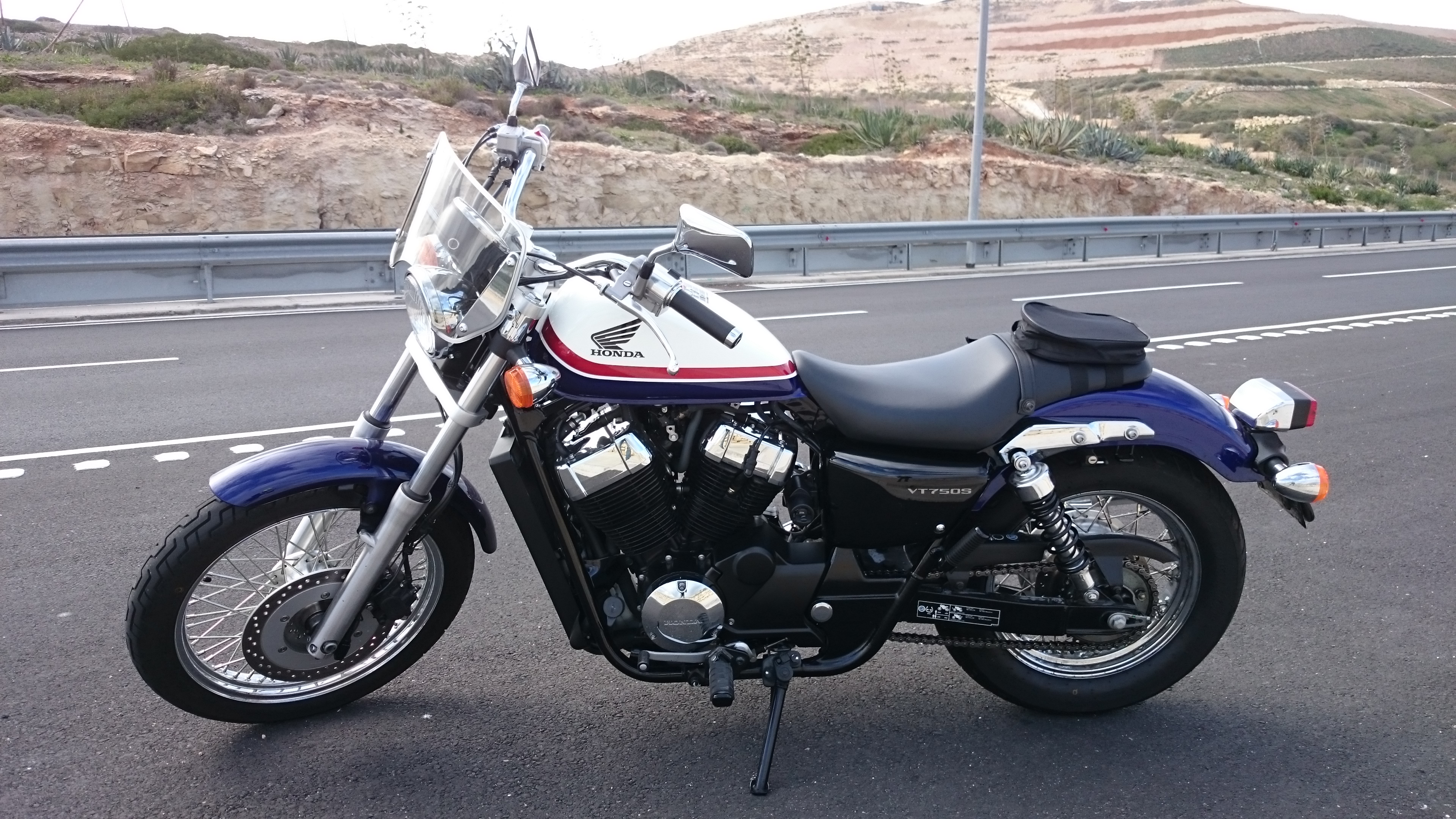
2012 Honda VT750S Tricolour

Honda announced in 2009 that they would produce a roadster version of the Shadow 750 with chain final drive. Honda Motor Co. originally designed the VT750S, powered by the RC58E fuel-injected 52° V-twin, for their domestic market. Nonetheless, the made-in-Japan VT750S was exported to Europe as well as Australia and New Zealand.

At the request of American Honda, this new model was also exported to North America as the VT750RS (Retro Standard). With the arrival of the VT750RS in 2010, there were four concurrent models in the Shadow 750 lineup: the fuel-injected RS and Phantom, in addition to the carbureted (in North America) Spirit and Aero. Honda kept the Shadow RS on the roster for four model years, from 2010 to 2013 inclusive.

With frame geometry that differed significantly from Shadow cruisers, the VT750S and RS models' footpegs, handlebars and seat put the rider into a neutral, upright posture. The seat height of 750 millimetres (29.5 inches), for example, was higher than most cruisers and a full 100 mm (3.9 in) above that of the Shadow Phantom. Rake and trail were 32.5 degrees and 134 millimetres (5.3 inches), 1.5 degrees steeper and approximately 26 mm (1 in) less than other Shadows. The VT750RS wheelbase of 1,560 millimetres (61.4 inches) was about 79 mm (3.1 in) shorter.

The VT750RS had spoked wheels with tube-type tires, 100/90-19 in front and 150/80-16-inch in back. Brakes were a single 296 mm front disc with a twin-piston caliper and a mechanical drum rear.

Several reviewers observed that there was more than a passing resemblance between the VT750RS and Sportster 883 models; Honda's 10.7 liters (2.4 imp gal; 2.8 U.S. gal) peanut-shaped fuel tank, for instance, emulated classic Sportster tanks. A few road tests included side-by-side comparisons of the Honda and the Harley-Davidson.

For the 2011 model year, the VT750RS was painted in Honda Racing tricolors, evocative of the Honda VFR750R.

==== VT750C 52° V-twin, shaft drive ====
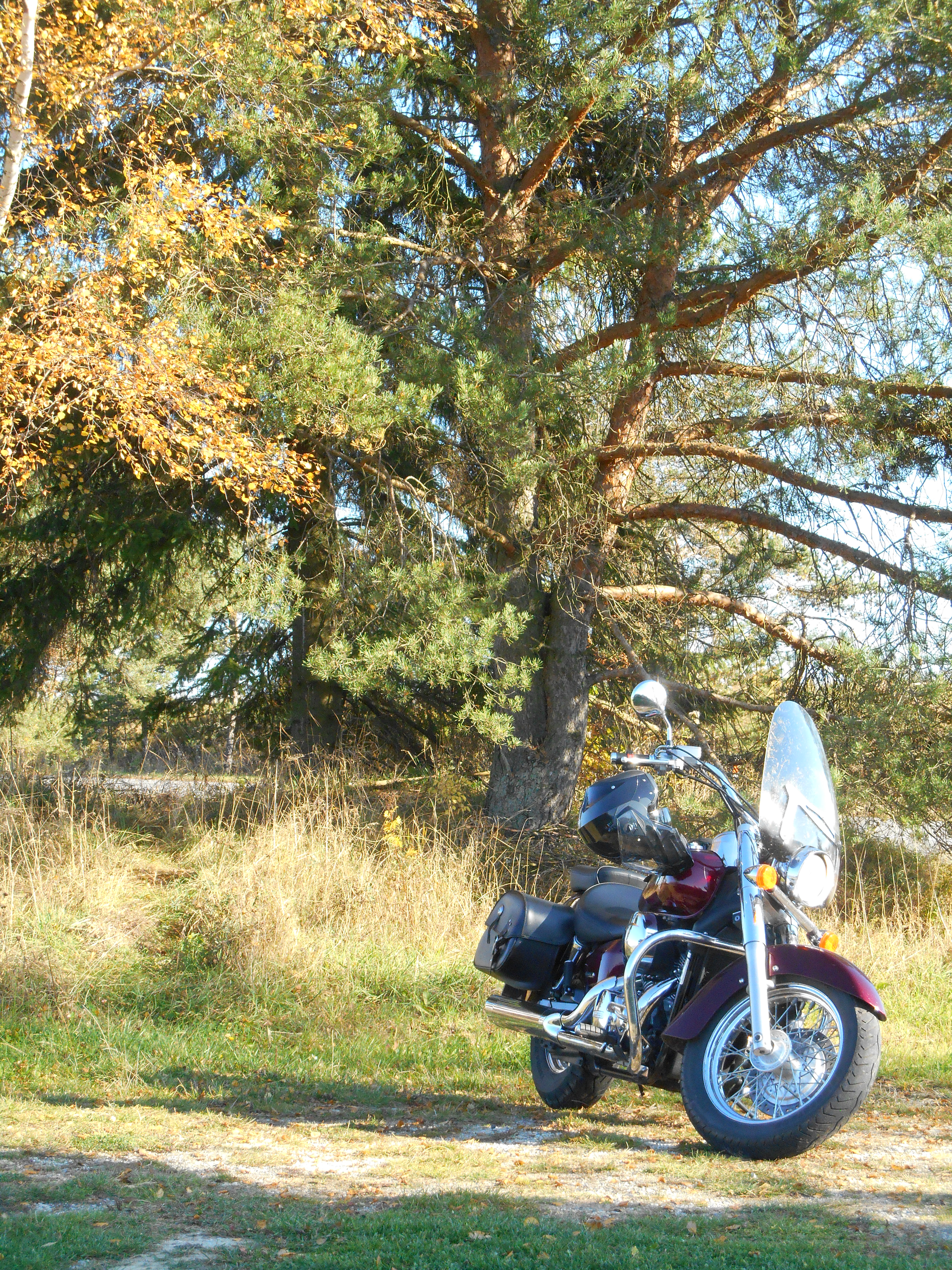
Honda VT 750 C Shadow

At the 2003 Tokyo Motor Show, Honda exhibited a preproduction "low-and-long" 750cc Shadow kitted out in retro-style bodywork, equipped with shaft final drive and the Honda Ignition Security System (HISS) electronic anti-theft device.

Honda dropped the ACE and Spirit models from the 750cc Shadow line for 2004, manufacturing just the new VT750C Shadow Aero model (chain-drive Spirit production restarted in 2005). The reengineered RC50E engine was still a 52-degree, liquid-cooled V-Twin, single-pin crankshaft configuration. SOHC cylinder heads still had two spark plugs and three valves, but were modified to increase the compression ratio. Engine tuning changes de emphasized peak power in favor of torque at low and mid RPMs. A 2‑into‑1 exhaust ended in a large muffler containing separate silencers for each cylinder (similar to that on the 750 ACE) as well as a catalytic converter. The dual CV carburetors of the RC44E motor were replaced by a single CV carburetor on the RC50E. A new steel-tube frame with lower frame rails moved the Aero's seat height further down than either of the models it replaced.

Honda replaced the 2‑into‑1 exhaust with a 2‑into‑2 system for 2008 and subsequent model years, including the 2008‑2009 Shadow Tourer VT750T model equipped with a windscreen, saddlebags and passenger backrest. Except for North America, 2008 VT750C models had programmed fuel injection (PGM-FI) in place of the CV carburetor. Shadow Aero models were given PGM-FI in North America starting with the 2011 model year.

Honda offers anti-lock brake options for the 750cc Shadow Aero. Early VT750CA models had front-wheel ABS only, subsequent VT750CS models replace the rear drum brake with a hydraulic disk brake, required for Honda's combined ABS (C-ABS) with individual control of front and rear brakes. Shadow Aero VT750C and VT750CS models remain in the American Honda line-up for 2019.

===== VT750C2 =====
In 2007 (the twenty-fifth year of the Shadow line) Honda sold three different Shadow 750 cruisers, the original chain-drive Spirit, the shaft-drive Aero and the first Spirit VT750C2. Canadian automotive journalist David Booth said "that the VT750C2 is essentially the mechanicals of the VT750C Aero mated to the styling of the VT750D Spirit, with a few essential tweaks." The C2 model inherited its 750cc engine from the Aero, with a CV carburetor for North America and a PGM-FI throttle body elsewhere.

The VT750C2 Spirit came by its frame layout from the VT750C Aero as well, but Honda's designers adjusted the new Spirit's geometry to give it a drag-bike or chopper-style appearance. A wheelbase stretched to 1,655 millimetres (65.2 in), a rake angle of 34°30' along with noticeable triple-tree offset gave prominence to bare forks and a 21-inch front wheel (a first for Honda cruisers). The chopper look was reinforced by a two-into-two exhaust system and a seat height reduced to 650 millimetres (25.6 in).

There were two significant updates to the VT750C2 Spirit. From 2012, North American Spirit models eliminated the carburetor in favor of a PGM-FI throttle body. From 2013, a new Spirit VT750C2S model with antilock front and rear disc brakes (C-ABS) was sold alongside the VT750C2 in the US and was the only model offered in Europe.

Confusingly, the model code VT750C2 had already been used to identify 1997-2001 European and Australian 750 Shadows with two-tone paint.

===== VT750C2B =====
The 2010 VT750C2B Shadow Phantom debuted in Fall 2009 powered by a blackened fuel-injected version (engine code RC53E) of the existing Shadow 750 shaft-drive engine. The Phantom's frame and abridged bodywork, based on the Aero 750, were both painted black. This model was called the Shadow Black Spirit in European markets. Honda Motor Europe described the VT750C2B, called Shadow Black Spirit in some European markets, a variant of the VT750C2 Shadow Spirit with "authentic bobber styling."

In North America, the 2010 model year marked the arrival of PGM-FI equipped Shadow 750 engines, in both Phantom and VT750RS models.

The VT750C2B Shadow Phantom remains in the American Honda line-up for 2019.

==== VT750C recall ====
Honda and NHTSA issued a January 2016 recall for 2010 through 2016 VT750C/CA/CS, VT750C2/ C2F/C2S, and VT750C2B models. The NHTSA announcement said that “engine vibration may cause the bank angle sensor wire to rub on the wire harness joint connector, resulting in a loss of the sensor signal.” Honda Motor Company had received reports, dating back to 2013, of engine stall or misfire incidents resulting from bank angle sensor failure.

==== VT400 replica ====
Honda Japan created a series of VT400 (in Japanese) models for the Japanese domestic market in 1997, practically identical to the VT750 series but with smaller displacement engines. Among these was the Shadow Slasher, introduced in February 2000. From 2009, Honda Australia imports the VT400 as a Learner Approved Motorcycle alongside the popular VT750.

=== 1,100 cc VT Class ===
The V-Twin 1100 (VT1100) was introduced by Honda in 1985 and was in continuous production till 2007.
All models used an 1099cc displacement engine, the Honda VT1100 engine with minimal mechanical changes during its production.

==== 1985-1986 ====
The VT1100C (Sc18?) model was introduced in 1985 as a larger model from the 750/800 cc models. The 1985–86 models are recognizable by the dual horns below the headlight, square turn signals, dual front disk brakes, and one exhaust pipe on each side (front cylinder on right side, rear cylinder on left). There are dual gauges on the bars for speedometer and tachometer, and fuel and temperature gauges on the fuel tank. The engine is a 1,099 cc (67.1 cu in) SOHC liquid cooled V-twin with a five-speed transmission and shaft drive. the 1985 and 1986 engines were higher performance engines vs later models, having a longer stroke and smaller piston compared to 1987 and later models, allowing this first generation motor to make approximately 76 horsepower.

==== 1987-1996 ====
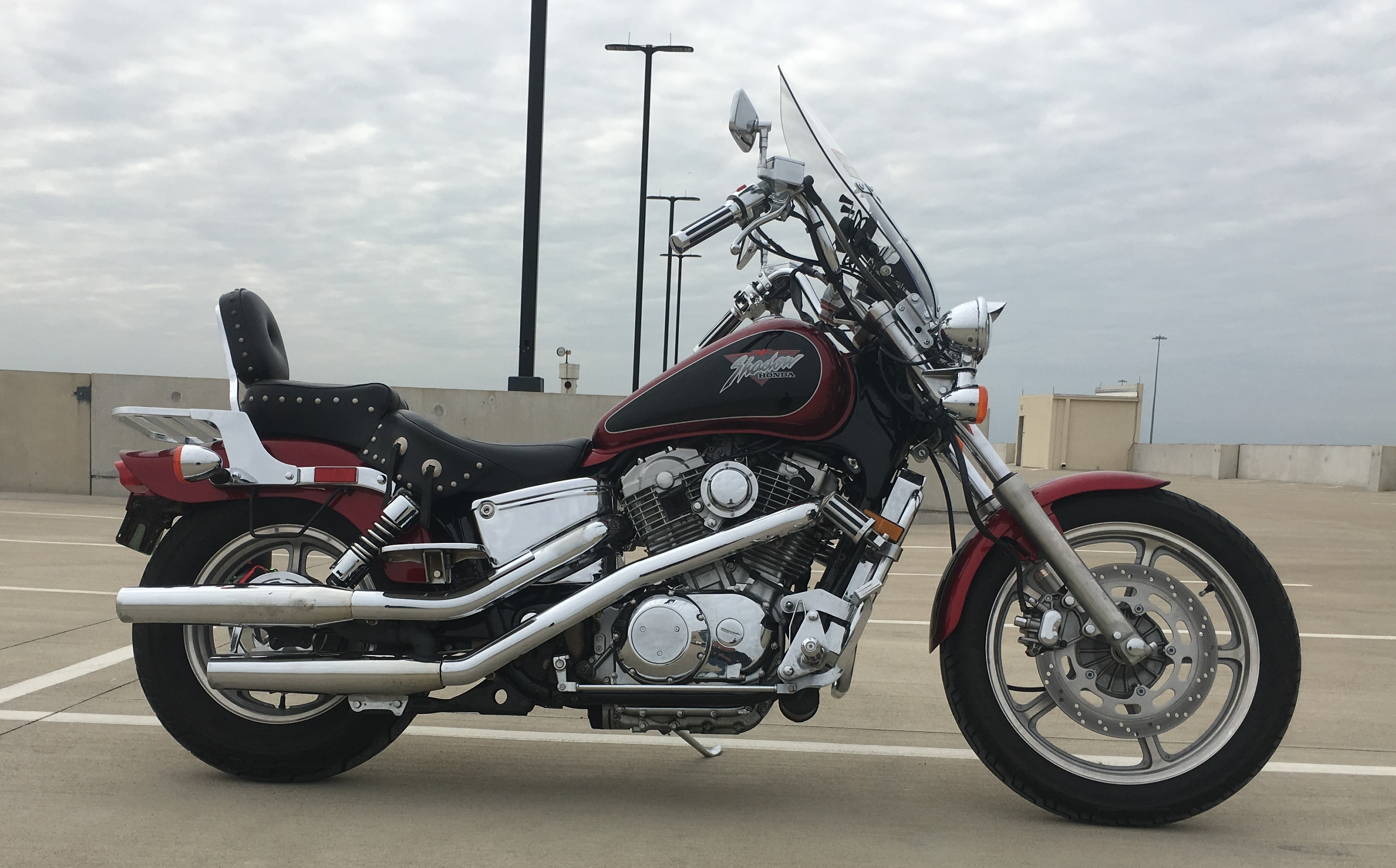
1994 Honda VT1100C

The 1987 VT1100C model took on a brand-new look with a lower seat (660 mm (26 in)), a longer wheelbase 1,700 millimetres (65 in), a 13.0 litres; 2.86 imperial gallons (3.44 US gal) fuel tank, an extended front fork 41 mm (1.6 in), and weighs a hefty 265 kg (584 lb). Both exhaust pipes were now run along the right side of the bike, with the horns being relocated to the sides of the engine. The engine, while the same 1099 cc displacement as the previous model, is rated for approximately 63 horsepower due to shorter stroke and larger pistons. It also now had a five-speed transmission with a hydraulically actuated clutch. The "VT1100C" model was not manufactured in 1991 (to sell off excess stock of 1990 models), but returned in 1992 with a "Made in the USA" stamp on the seat.
Some sites will list this model as the "VT1100 Standard" or "1100 Shadow Standard", but this was never an official name.
This styling continued virtually unchanged through 1996.

==== 1995 ====
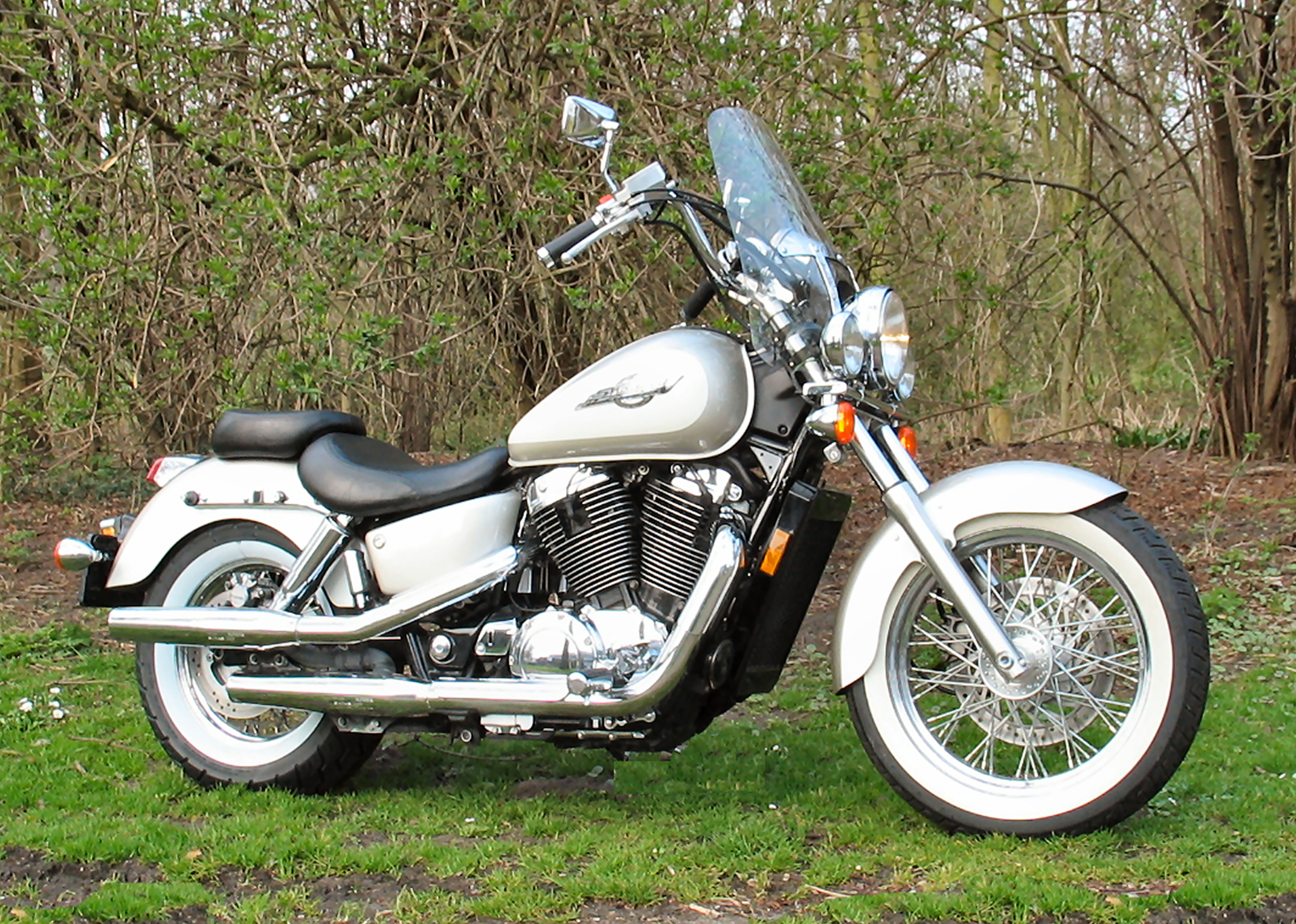
1997 Honda VT1100C ACE

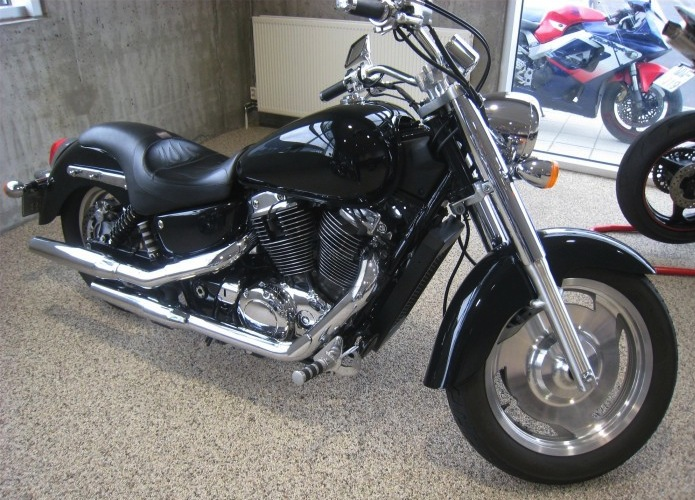
Honda Shadow Sabre 1100

In 1995, the V-Twin market really got going, and manufacturers expanded their offerings with variants of their standing models.
The American Classic Edition (A.C.E.) (VT1100C2) was introduced this year as an additional model to the still available VT1100C. It featured a more retro styling than the VT1100C, with a full rear fender, induced vibrations, and a 'Harley-Davidson-like' sound from a single pin crank engine. The model lost about 10 hp, but gained a new 5 speed transmission.

==== 1997-2007 ====
1997 saw the Standard replaced with the Spirit with more chrome on the engine but the same basic engine as the standard. This model also has a 5 speed transmission and a cable actuated clutch. There were slight frame and body work changes with this model versus the previous model as well. Horns were moved to the front of the bike and the front exhaust now follows the frame instead of cutting across the engine.

An ACE Tourer was also introduced based on the 1100 Spirit engine but the ACE styling. The ACE Tourer came with a two-into-one-into-two exhaust system, a counterbalanced with a dual crank pin crankshaft, and hard, color-matched saddlebags. The last of the 6,000+ Tourer models was produced in January 2001.

==== 1998-2003 ====
In 1998, 1100cc Honda rolled out the VT1100C3 Aero, based on the VT1100C2 ACE engine with the single pin crank, but a larger two into one exhaust and more retro styling. The 1100 Aero was discontinued after the 2003 model year.

==== 2000-2007 ====
The Honda Shadow Sabre model was introduced, based on the Honda VT1100 engine with different styling than the still manufactured Spirit model. The most notable feature was the front cast aluminum wheel. This model also had a slightly lower rear gear ratio in the transmission allowing the bike to have better off the line acceleration than the regular Spirit model; however this also caused higher engine RPM at highway speeds.
Due to lower sales and the availability of the VTX1300, 2007 was the final year Honda made the VT1100 Shadow.

== Reviews ==
- 2001 Honda Shadow 650 VT
- 2007 Honda Shadow Spirit 750 - 1st Ride
