= Honda VT1100 =

Motorcycle engine

The Honda VT1100 Shadow is a cruiser motorcycle in the Honda Shadow series, using a VT1100 engine. It debuted in 1985 until production ended in 2007. As of 1990, the retail price for the Honda VT1100 in the United States was $6,000; by 1999, it was $9,700 to $11,000.

== Engine ==
It is a liquid cooled, 1,099 cubic centimetres (67.1 cu in), 45 degree V-twin. It has a bore and stroke of 87.5mm x 91.4mm with an 8:1 compression ratio. It is a shaft driven, single overhead cam SOHC, V2, with 3 valves and 2 spark plugs per cylinder. The valves are hydraulically actuated, requiring little, if any, maintenance over the life of the engine. They come with dual 36mm diaphragm-type CV carburetors and a solid state digital ignition.

Depending on application and tuning, The dual pin crankshaft models produce at the crankshaft (brake horsepower) ~62 horsepower (46 kW) @ 5000 rpm and ~69 pound force-feet (94 N⋅m) @ 2750 rpm. Single pin crank models produced about 10 horsepower (7.5 kW) and 10 pound force-feet (14 N⋅m) less. The 1985-1986 models produced about 78.4 bhp @ 6000 rpm and 73 ft lbs @ 4,500rpm. These engines came with either a 5 speed manual transmission (1985-1986, 1997-2007) or a 4 speed manual transmission (1987-1996 VT1100C). All years are shaft drive.

Final drive ratio is similar between these transmissions (with one exception the Honda Shadow Spirit has a 14% higher final drive ratio, this lowers the RPM at highway speeds. For the lower geared bikes such as on the VT1100T the 33T on the countershaft drives the 31T on the damper shaft (Honda calls this a cross shaft.) For the VT1100T, Sabre and Aero in high gear RPM is around 3250 @ 60 mph. Honda not only put a slightly lower first gear in the VT1100T to help with an expected fully loaded touring motorcycle, but also used this lower gear in the Tourer and Sabre. Honda also placed a slightly lower 5th gear in the Aero, Tourer, Sabre to give it around 3380 RPM @ 60 mph. 8:1 compared to the 7.6:1 of the A.C.E. For the higher geared VT1100C (1997-2007) 36T on the countershaft drives the 29T on the damper shaft. For the VT1100C Spirit high gear RPM is around 2730 @ 60 mph.

Honda said the Aero has about 5 more HP than the other VT1100's because of the exhaust system design, but compared to the ACE it weighs about 40 pounds more. Also the lower high gear ratio in the Aero gives it better passing power without downshifting but at a noticeable cost in fuel economy.

== Models ==
The VT1100 has been used in the following Honda motorcycles with these model designations:

- VT1100C - 1985-1996 (sometimes called "Classic")
- VT1100C - 1997-2007 (Spirit) models
- VT1100C2 - 1995-1999 American Classic Edition (ACE) and 2000-2007 Sabre models
- VT1100C3 - 1998-2002 Aero models
- VT1100T - 1998-2001 ACE Tourer models.

The 1995-1999 VT1100C2 ACE and 1998-2001 VT1100C3 Aero models are single crank-pin models, all other 1100s are dual crankpin. The single crank pin model gave the engine a "loping idle" and more "rumble" in an attempt to mimic Harley-Davidson V-twins. It also lost about 10 horsepower (7.5 kW) and around 10 ft lbs of torque compared to the dual pin engine. There is also more vibration with the single pin crank engine.
