= Honda Ascot (motorcycle) =

Type of motorcycle

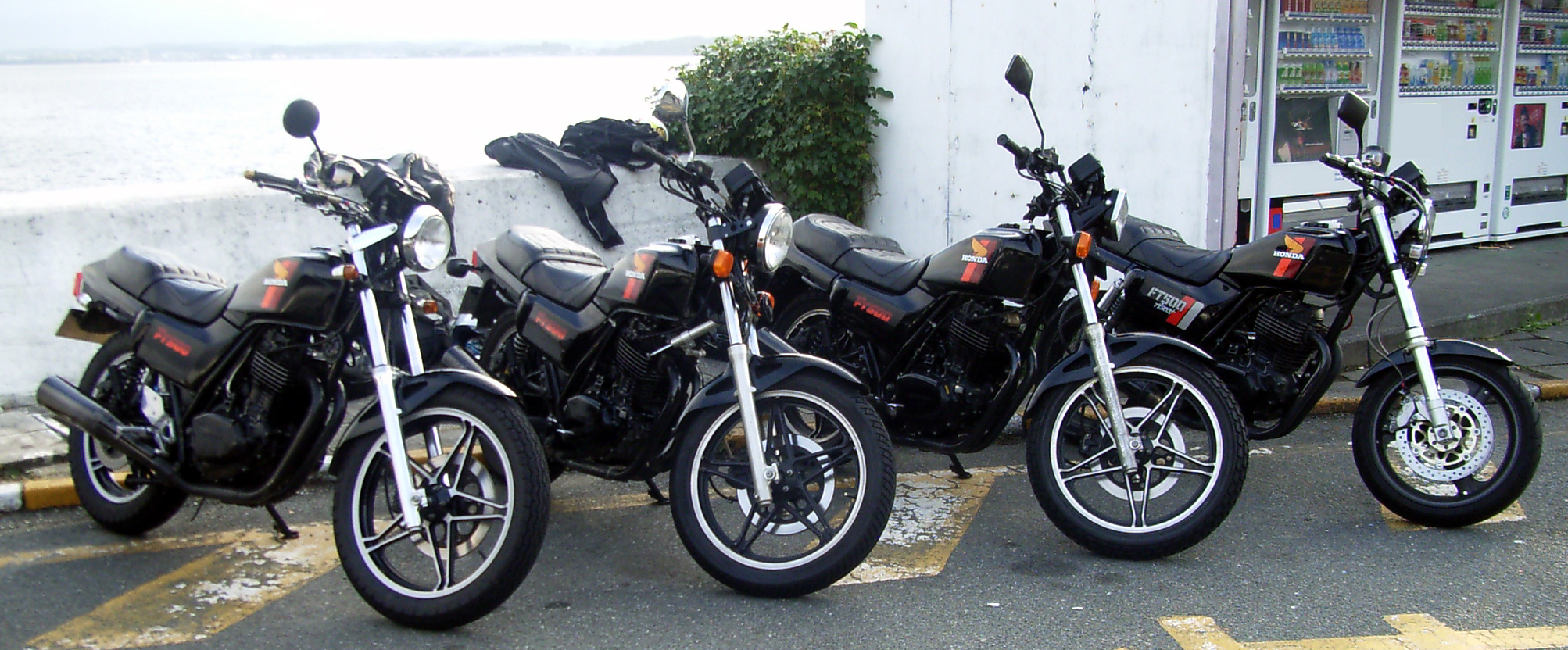
Honda FT500 motorcycles

The Honda Ascot is a name given to two motorcycles produced by Honda in the early 1980s. The motorcycles, the FT500 and VT500FT, were produced with the Ascot name between 1982 and 1984 as part of the Honda VT500 engine series.

== FT500 (1982) ==
The Honda Ascot, designated FT500, was sold in 1982 in the colors Monza Red or Black. The tank stripes and the "FT500" decal are gray and silver on the red bike and red and orange on the black bike. On American bikes, the speedometer was limited to 85 mph (135 km/h) as was required, in other markets the bike received a 180 km/h (112 mph) speedometer. The headlight is rectangular and so are the instruments. The engine is a 498 cc SOHC, 4-valve single-cylinder with 8.6:1 compression ratio, and one carburetor, producing 35 PS (26 kW) at 6500 rpm. This balance shaft-equipped engine was derived from that of the Honda XL500 enduro motorcycle, but tuned for highway usage through the use of a vacuum carburetor and other adjustments. The transmission is a 5-speed (1st=2.462:1 2nd=1.647:1 3rd=1.250:1 4th=1.000:1 5th=0.840:1), also from the XL 500 but with tempered gears and a stronger chain. Stock gearing is 15/42 (3.71:1). The brakes are twin piston disc front and rear and the bike has an electric starter, forgoing a kickstart entirely. The 156 kg (344 lb) motorcycle has a top speed of about 150 km/h (93 mph) and achieved an average fuel economy of 48 mpg. The serial numbers begin with JH2PC0708CM000019.

== FT500 (1983) ==
The 1983 FT500 was also sold in Monza Red or Black. The tank and side cover stripes on the red bike are white and blue; and on the black bike, they are silver and red. The headlight and instruments are rectangular. The speedometer has a 120 mph (195 km/h) limit. The engine remained the 498 cc OHC, 4-valve single cylinder with one carburetor. For 1983 the oil drain plug was moved from the front of the oil pan to the left side. The transmission is a 5-speed. The serial numbers begin with JH2PC070*DM100001. The brakes are dual piston, front and rear.

== VT500FT (1983) ==
The 1983 VT500FT Ascot received a twin cylinder rather than the single-cylinder used on earlier models. It was sold in one of two colors: Pearl Siren Blue or Candy Bourgogne Red. The side cover panel on the blue bike is silver; and on the red bike, the panel is black. The gas tank wing decal is two-tone. The 2-into-1 exhaust system is black chrome. The engine is a 491 cc OHC, 3-valve, liquid-cooled V-twin producing 48 to 50 Horsepower at 9,000 RPM. The Transmission is a 6-speed (1st: 2.86, 2nd: 1.95, 3rd: 1.55, 4th: 1.28, 5th: 1.07, 6th: 0.87) and uses a shaft drive. Top speed is approx. 122Mph (196 Kph). The serial numbers begin with JH2PC070*DM100001.

== VT500FT'84 ==
The VT500FT'84 Ascot was sold in 1984 in one of two colors: Black or Red. The side cover panel on the black bike is silver; and on the red bike, the panel is black. The gas tank wing decal is three-tone. The 2-into-1 exhaust system is black chrome. The engine is a 491 cc OHC, 3-valve, liquid-cooled V-twin linked to a 6-speed transmission and a shaft drive. The serial numbers begin with JH2PC070*EM100001.
