= Undertray =

Automotive aerodynamic component

An undertray, also known as a belly pan or underbody shield, is an aerodynamic component used in automotive design to smooth the airflow underneath a vehicle. By covering the complex and irregular components of the lower chassis; such as the engine, suspension, and exhaust system—an undertray reduces drag.

== See also ==
- Diffuser (automotive)
- Ground effect (cars)
- Splitter (automotive)
- Venturi effect
