= Honda VT500 =

Middle weight motorcycle

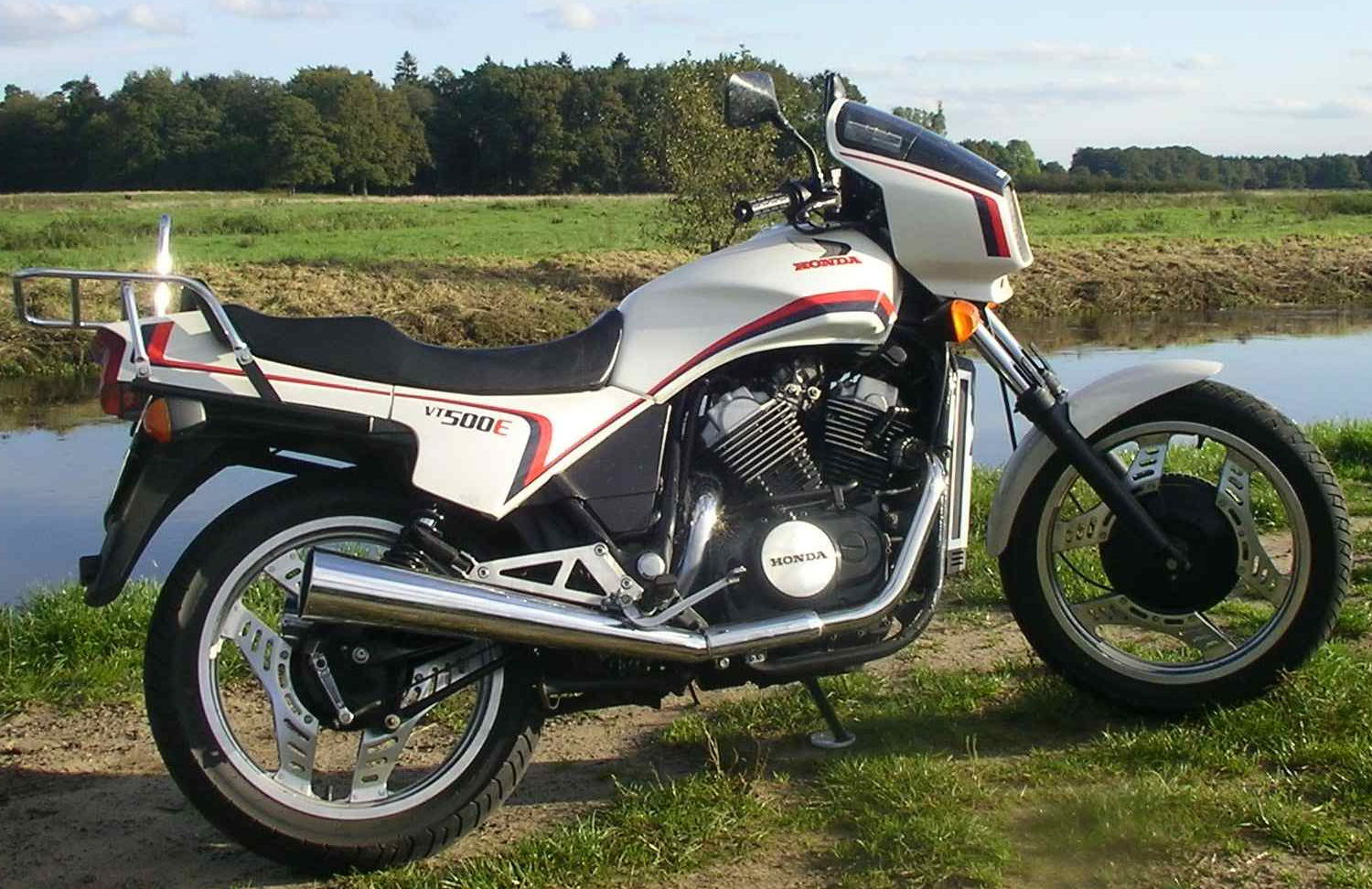
1984 VT500E

VT500 is a common name for the family of motorcycles sharing the Honda VT500 V-twin engine, with the cylinders set inline with the long-axis of the frame. Launched at the Cologne motorcycle show in September 1982, it was produced with various designations for different countries, such as Ascot, Shadow and Euro.

== Design parameters ==
Conventional V twin engines often had the fore and aft cylinders set at 90-degrees to reduce the primary engine vibration, which in turn created a bulky, long engine requiring a long-wheelbase frame.

Honda briefed their engineers to produce a compact, V twin engine with any angle narrower than 90 degrees, but leaving enough space between the cylinders to locate conventional carburetors with the airbox located under the fuel tank, to maintain a slim-profile without side-facing carburetors associated with some marques. The optimal design was found to be with the cylinder angle set at 52 degrees, but additionally having offset crankpins to achieve acceptable levels of vibration reduction without the need for additional balancing shafts which would have added weight and reduced power. The narrow-V engine was compact and at the time was one of the lightest and narrowest, enabling a frame design offering good maneuverability.

== Specification ==
The engine is a 491cc liquid-cooled, V-twin, 4 stroke. The cylinders are splayed 52 degrees apart with a crankshaft that has its throws offset by 76 degrees, in order to achieve the lower primary vibration levels close to a 90-degree V-twin.

- Bore: 71mm
- Stroke: 62mm
- Valves: 3 per cylinder
- Power: 54 hp (35.4 kW) at 9,000 rpm
- Gearbox: Six speed with overdrive top gear
- Torque: 31 ft lb (42 Nm) at 7,000 rpm

== Transmission ==
The gear ratios among all the VT500s were the same though the final drive at the rear differential differed between each model. All the VT500 models were shaft drive but other variations/evolutions of the engine had a chain drive output instead.

All VT500 Transmission Gear Ratios:

- 1st: 2.86
- 2nd: 1.95
- 3rd: 1.55
- 4th: 1.28
- 5th: 1.07
- 6th: 0.87

Final Drive Ratios:

- VT500E: 3.35
- VT500FT: 3.35
- VT500C: 2.94

== Models ==
The VT500s came in the form of a VT500E Euro, a VT500C Shadow, and a VT500FT Ascot from 1983 to 1988 depending on the model and region. Each differs from minor differences to major changes between each other but they all share the same engine and intake system. Although most VT500s made 50hp some countries had access to 25hp versions for different tiers of operator's licenses.

=== VT500E Euro ===
The Euro was offered from 1983 to 1988 primarily in Europe, it was not available in North America. The model was very popular with despatch riders, primarily for its low-maintenance shaft drive, flexible engine and slim frame. This made it hard to find a low mileage example by as early as 1990. It was 390lbs (177 kg) equipped with front in-board disc and rear drum brakes sitting on 18" Comcast 3-spoke wheels front and back with a seat height of 31 inches and rearward footpegs. The headlight bucket leads the E's cosmetics being inclosed behind a "bikini-fairing" and small windshield, the rest of the bike's cosmetics are styled quite similarly to the V45 Sabre. The tank is very angular and pointed at the front edge then tapers with leg cut-outs to the thin seat with a taller passenger bump and lastly a gentle up-turn like a lip spoiler. Following the seat is a wrap-over grab bar mounted to a complex rear cowl (and extended rear fender) and angular taillight. The proceeding side covers are large but only the rear halves are painted to match the body line of the fuel tank, the forward parts of the side covers are painted black to match the engine and frame.

=== VT500FT Ascot ===
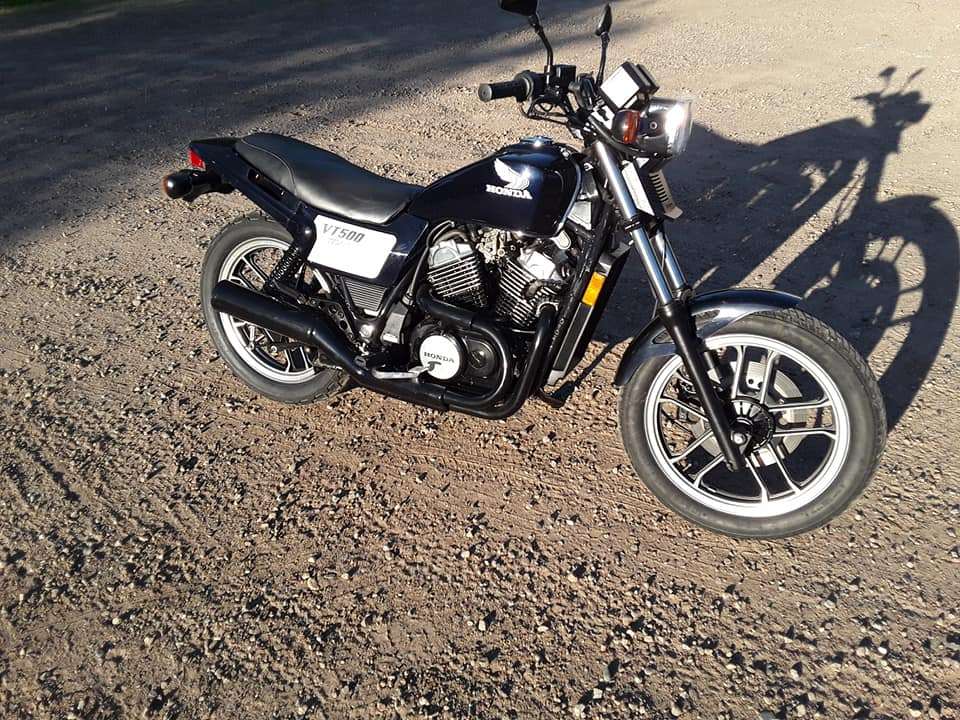
Restored 1983 Honda VT500FT Ascot in Pearl Siren Blue

The Ascot was only available in North America and only for 1983 & 1984 overlapping the similarly named but entirely different 1982-1983 Honda FT500 Ascot.

The 1983 VT500 Ascot was 390lbs (177 kg) equipped with front disc and rear drum brakes sitting on 18" Comcast 5-spoke wheels front and back with a seat height of 31 inches and rearward footpegs. Appearance is sporty with a square tank (2.5 gallon (11 l) capacity) tapering to the long sleek seat with a gentle bump for the passenger tapering to the similarly shaped rear cowl. Beneath the seat is flat-tracker-style number plate side cover with a large decal stating "VT500 Ascot" emulating a number board/panel. The right side cover has a lower section painted black to emulate the rectifier regulator found on the left side exposed just below the left side cover. Exhaust is completely black chrome 2 into 1 system with a resonator/power-chamber above the center stand and a large cylindrical muffler with black chrome headshields covering all of the exhaust system's joints. Other cosmetic characteristics include a square headlight, "rounded-rectangle" turn signals, sporty horn cover, flat black trim, aluminum mounts with "speed holes", and black square gauges with aircraft-style gauge backgrounds.

In 1983 the VT500FT Ascot was available in Pearl Siren Blue (very dark blue with subtle but plentiful blue, purple, and red metallics) and Candy Bourgogne Red (medium/dark red with a bright metallic). In 1984 the VT500FT Ascot was available in Black (simply gloss black) and Metallic Red (very similar to the 83's "Candy Bourgogne Red" but slightly darker red base coat.

Notable differences between the 1983 & 1984 VT500FT Ascots consist of the wheels (83 had thick rim lips like VT500 Shadows while 84 had thin rim lips like VF700 Magnas), the foot controls (83 brake pedal & shifter were chrome while the 84 pedal & shifter were galvanized black), the tank decals (83 had 3 similar shades of grey on the Honda "wing" while 84 had 3 distinct shades of grey with very high metallic content), otherwise the only other noteworthy difference is a large wiring change in 84. No other mechanical differences exist outside the wiring update.

=== VT500C Shadow ===
The Shadow was offered world-wide from 1983 to 1986, though in a number of countries it was available through 1988. Riding on an Comcast's 18" front and 16" rear 5-spoke wheels with a 29-inch (735 mm) seat height, taller handle bars, and more forward-mounted foot controls this was the more popular cruiser alternative to the VT500 Euro & Ascot. The Shadow's hardware was all chrome and clear-coated aluminum typical of the other Honda cruisers of the time (Magnas & Shadow 750/700) so the only black parts on the bike are the frame, swingarm, radiator shroud, and engine (engine side covers became clear-coated aluminum in 1985).

For all VT500 Shadows the tank (3 gallons (13.5 l)) was a large teardrop shape tapering to the single-piece seat with an exaggerated scoop & bump for the driver and passenger respectively. Behind the seat is a mild aluminum grab-bar that corrals the taillight above the fender and flows halfway down the rear cowl/fender, the cowl/fender is painted to match the other bodywork. The side covers are an uneven parallelogram shape to match the frame and seat's bottom edge. The right side cover also emulates the rectifier-regulator found on the left side, the side covers are typically chrome with a full decal over the raised center section. The exhaust was a completely chrome 2 into 2 system utilizing a resonator/power-chamber above the centerstand.

== Developments ==
The VT500 is also the base for the later NTV, NT, VRX and XLV engines ranging from 400 to 750 cc.
