= Honda VT600C =

Honda Shadow 600
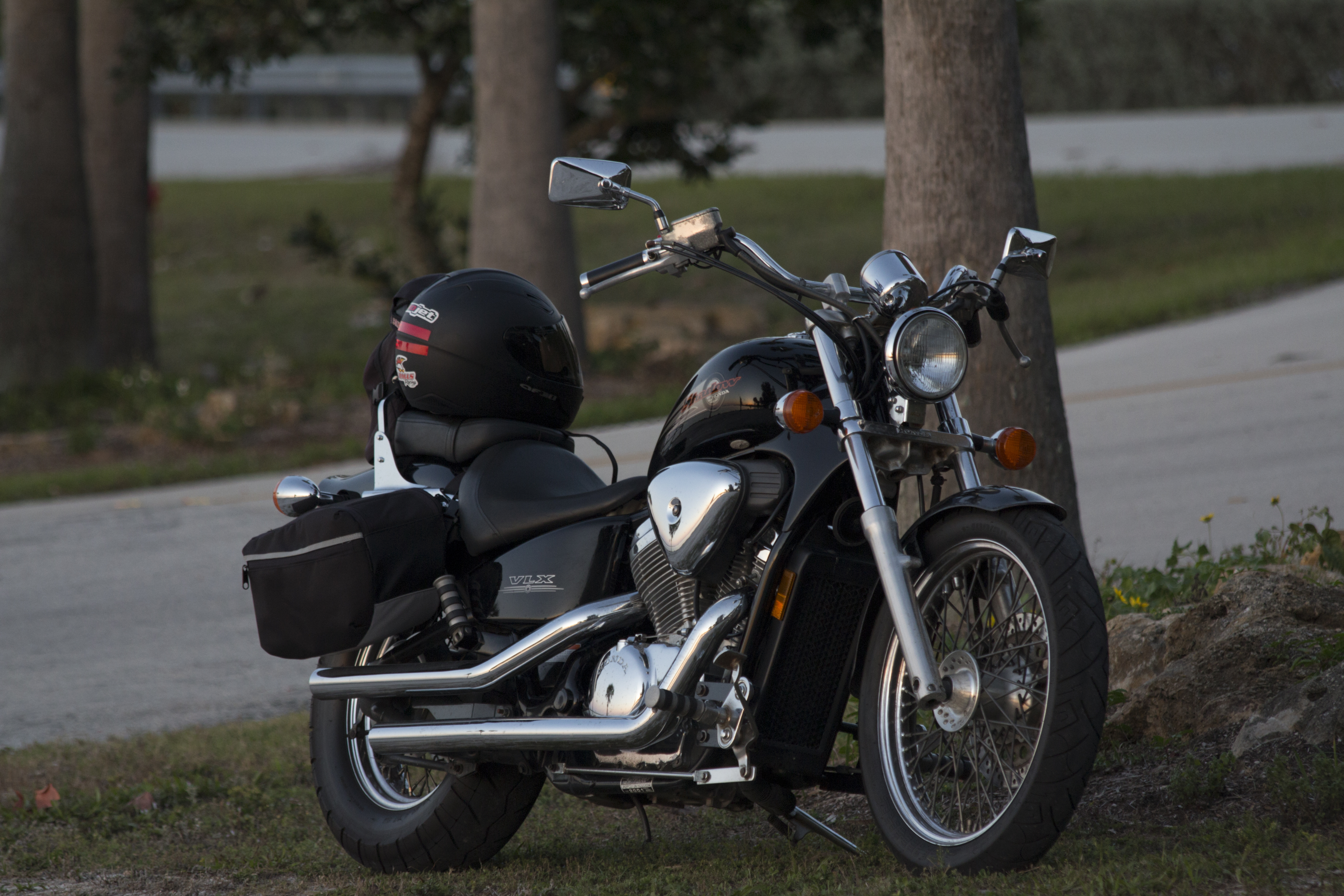
- Manufacturer: Honda
- Production: 1988–2008
- Class: Cruiser
- Engine: 583 cc (35.6 cu in) OHC 3-valve/cyl. liquid cooled V-twin
- Bore / stroke: 75.0 mm × 66.0 mm (2.95 in × 2.60 in)
- Top speed: 150 km/h
- Rake, trail: 35°
- Wheelbase: 1600 1,410 mm (55.5 in)
- Dimensions: L: 2,355 mm (92.7 in); W: 840 mm (33 in); H: 1,120 mm (44 in)
- Seat height: 690 mm (27 in)
- Weight: 205 kg (453 lb) (dry)
- Fuel capacity: 11 L; 2.4 imp gal (2.9 US gal)

The Honda Shadow VT600C, also known as the Honda Shadow VLX, is a cruiser motorcycle made by Honda from 1988 through 2008. It has a 583 cc (35.6 cu in) liquid cooled V-twin engine, a four-five(from1999) -speed transmission, 35° rake, chain drive, and a single-shock softail-style rear suspension. The VLX engine is borrowed from the Honda Transalp. The VLX is the initials for V-twin and lowered, and an X for extended rake. The Honda Shadow VT600C was also produced in Brazil from 1998 to 2005. Brazilian model Honda Shadow VLX has a five-speed transmission. Motorcyclist magazine's Aaron P. Frank included the Shadow VTX in a 2003 list of "America's 50 best bikes used", saying no better middleweight cruiser could be had for $3,500, and that the engine "is asthmatic, but runs forever".
