= Honda VTX Series =

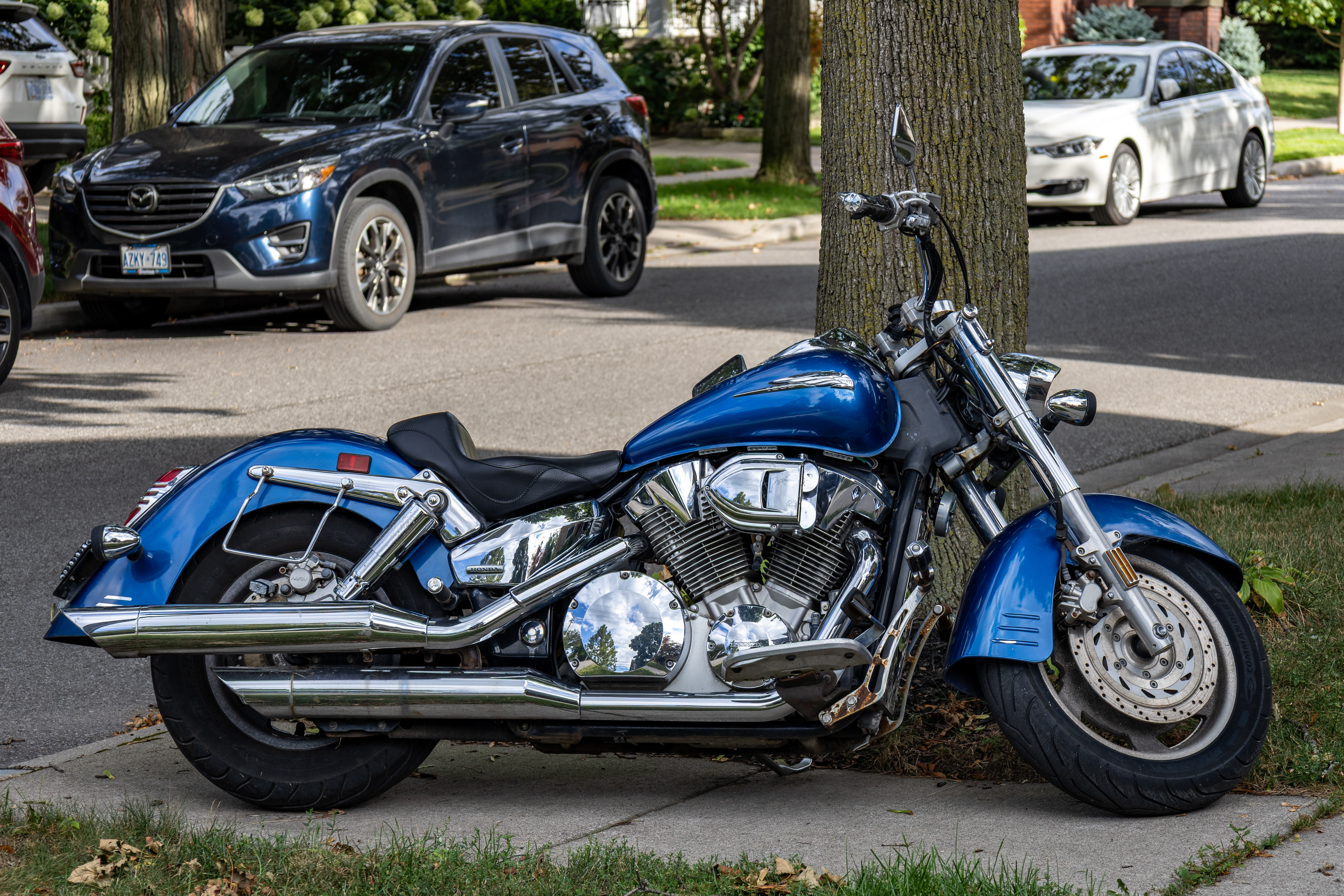
A Honda VTX1800 parked in the August sun in Walkerville, Ontario, 2025.

The Honda VTX series is a line of V-twin Honda cruiser motorcycles inspired by the Zodia concept shown at the 1995 Tokyo Motor Show. The Honda VTX 1800 was launched in 2001 as a 2002 model. At the time this bike was introduced as the Honda VTX engine was the largest displacement production V-twin in the world, but that distinction would be short-lived as the VTX1800 was superseded in 2004 by the 2.0-litre Kawasaki Vulcan 2000. Nevertheless, the VTX 1800 still produced better 0-60 mph and 1/4 mile times.

VTX stands for V-Twin Extreme. The VTX1300 line was introduced for the 2003 model year, which evolved into the VT1300C line starting with the 2010 model year.

In addition to the 52° V-twin layout, commonalities for the 1800 and 1300 powertrains include:

- radiator with cooling fan;
- cylinder heads with two intake valves and a single, larger, exhaust valve;
- rocker arms with screw-and-locknut clearance adjusters;
- electronic control unit with 3-D ignition maps for each cylinder;
- two spark plugs per cylinder;
- dry sump oil system with the oil tank inside the gearbox case;
- shaft final-drive.

== VTX1800 ==
Honda VTX 1800
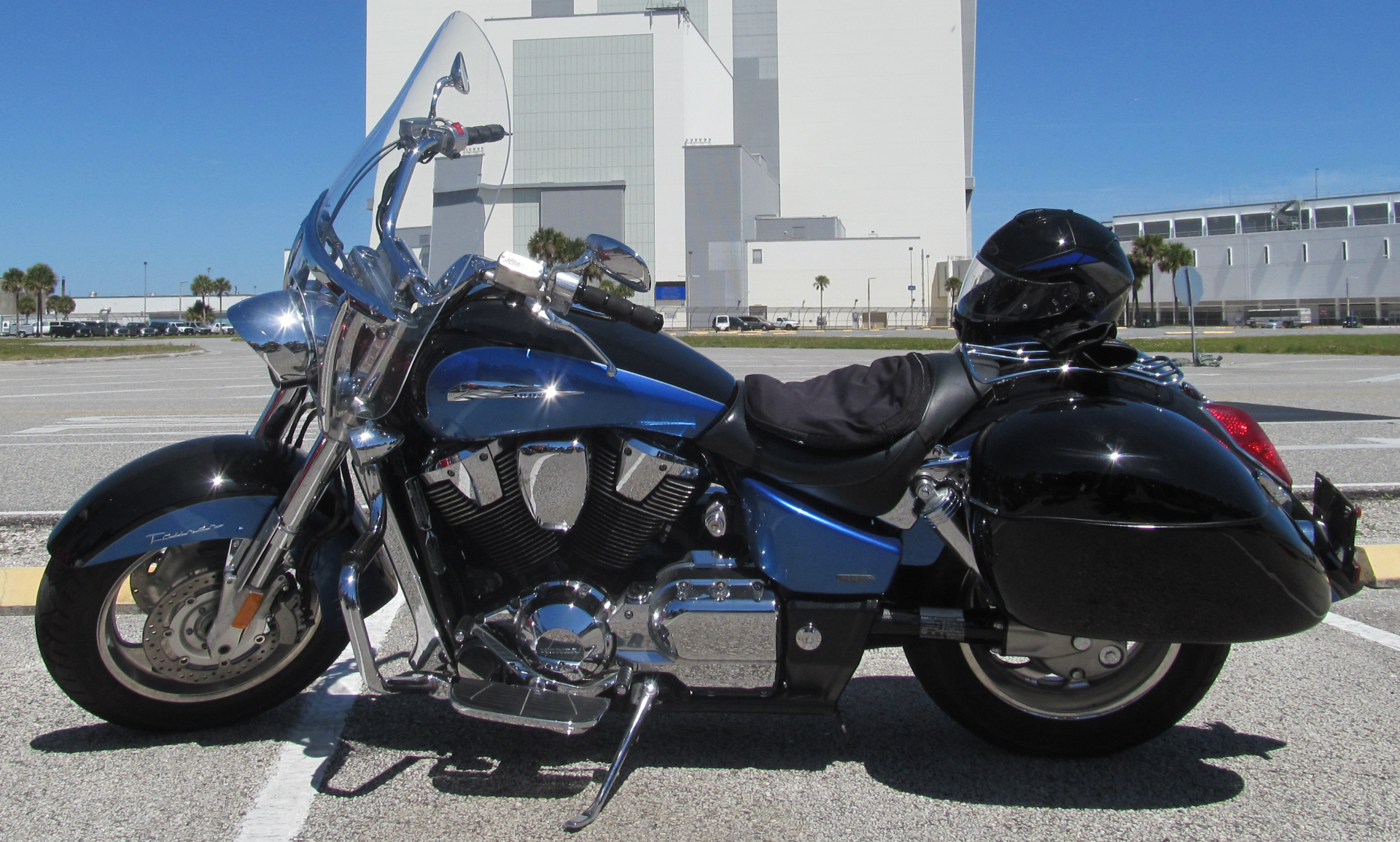
- VTX1800T Tourer model
- Manufacturer: Honda
- Production: 2001-2009
- Assembly: Marysville, Ohio,
- Predecessor: VT1100
- Class: Cruiser
- Engine: 1,795 cc (109.5 cu in) OHC, three valves per cylinder, liquid-cooled 52° V-twin
- Bore / stroke: 101.0 mm × 112.0 mm (3.98 in × 4.41 in)
- Compression ratio: 9.0:1
- Top speed: 125 mph (201 km/h) (measured)
- Power: 90 hp (67 kW) at 5,200 rpm (meas.)
- Torque: 98.9 ft⋅lb (134.1 N⋅m) at 2.850 rpm (meas.)
- Ignition type: Digital electronic
- Transmission: Shaft drive, 5-speed
- Frame type: Double-cradle steel tube
- Suspension: F: 45mm inverted fork, 5.1 in (130 mm) travel; 4.3 in (110 mm) travel [type F] R: Swingarm, dual shocks with adjustable preload, 3.9 in (99 mm) travel
- Brakes: F: Dual discs with LBS, three-piston calipers R: Single disc with LBS, two-piston caliper
- Tires: F: 130/70R-18 [type C] R: 180/70R-16 [C] F: 150/70R-17 [R,N] R: 180/70R-16 [R,N] F: 150/80R-17 [T] R: 180/70R-16 [T] F: 130/70R-18 [F] R: 180/55R-18 [F] F: 150/80B-17 [S] R: 180/70B-15 [S]
- Rake, trail: 32°/5.80 in (147 mm) [type C] 32°/6.40 in (163 mm) [R,N,S,T] 31°45'/5.70 in (145 mm) [F]
- Wheelbase: 67.5 in (1,710 mm)
- Seat height: 27.40–27.90 in (696–709 mm)
- Weight: 774–804 lb (351–365 kg) (wet)
- Fuel capacity: 4.8–5.3 US gal (18–20 L; 4.0–4.4 imp gal)

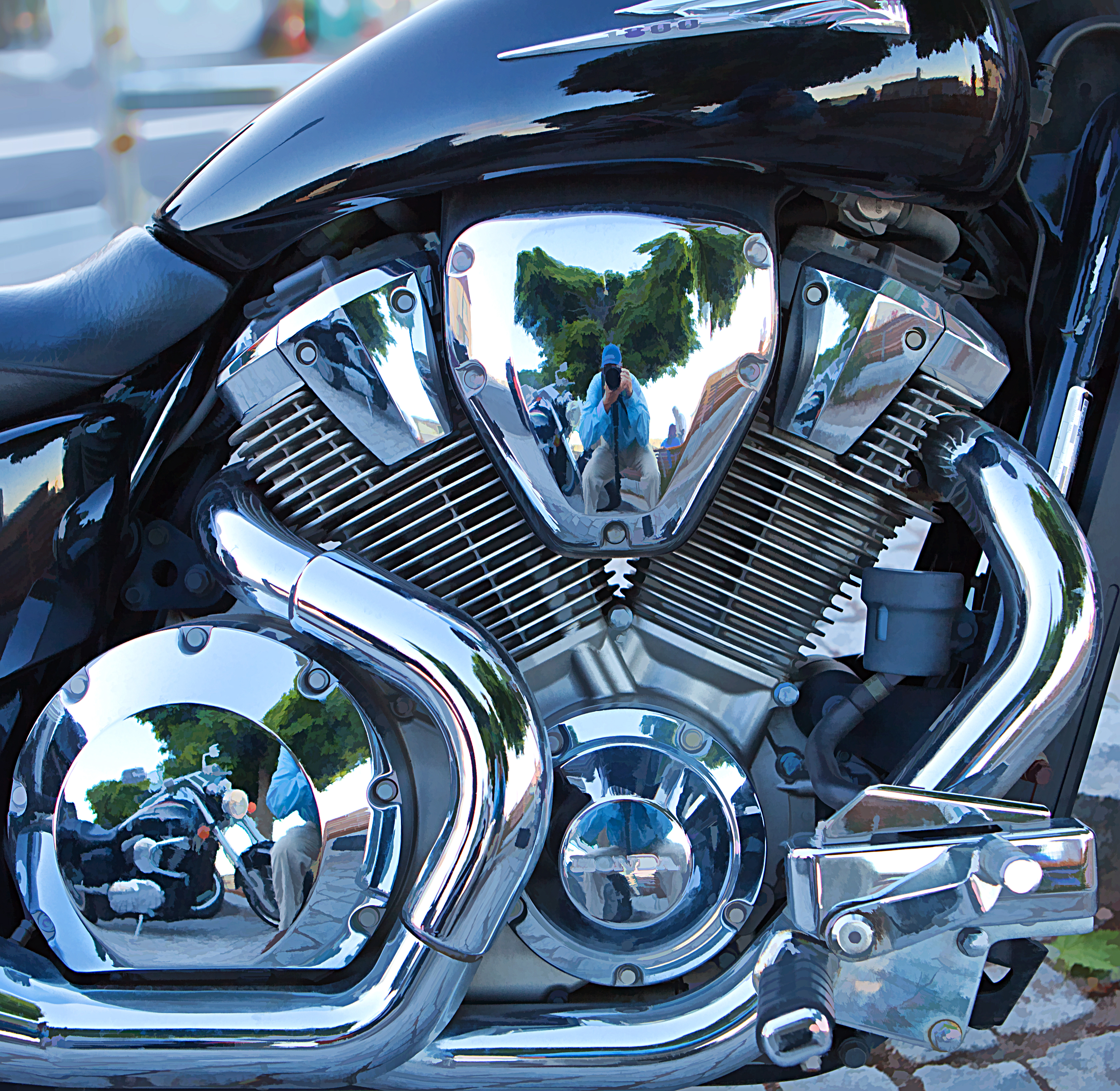
Honda VTX1800 motorcycle engine

Making amends for years of underperforming V-twins, Honda set out to produce a cruiser with the biggest displacement ever and so designed a big bike with a muscular looking body that was long and low to the ground, featuring significant rake and trail. Honda claimed that the 1800 put out 159 N⋅m (117 lbf⋅ft) of torque at only 3,000 rpm and 75 kW (101 hp) at 5000 rpm, making the VTX1800 one of the most powerful production V-twin motorcycles of its time. (See infobox for measured horsepower and torque values.)

On the VTX1800, Honda updated its linked braking feature, instead of having the usual separate hand and foot brakes, the hand brake operated two-thirds of the front pistons while the foot operated the other third in front and all the rear via a proportioning valve. The induction system was Honda's programmed Fuel Injection (PGM-FI) system using a Manifold Air Pressure (MAP) sensor in the small throttle areas until the standard throttle position sensor (Alpha N) took over at greater throttle opening values. The VTX1800 also had an emission control system that utilized air injection and catalytic converter controlled by the ECU to reduce hydrocarbons, carbon monoxide, and oxides of nitrogen to levels surpassing emissions standards.

The 52-degree V-twin included an offset-dual-pin crankshaft, a design first used on the 1983 Honda Shadow to produce perfect primary balance, as well as two primary-shaft-mounted counterbalancer weights to reduce the inevitable rocking couple vibration in a large V-twin engine.

When the VTX1800C was introduced in 2001, it was known as the VTX1800, or more often simply called the VTX. Honda of Japan announced the immediate importation of the American-manufactured VTX1800 cruiser model for their domestic market. There were three 2002 models, the initial VTX1800C Classic and then two Retro models, the VTX1800R with cast wheels plus the VTX1800S with spoke wheels (and tube-type tires).

Compared to the Retro models (and the others that would follow) the VTX1800 type C was identifiable by its two-into-one exhaust system, and its speedometer mounted within the handlebar risers. All the other models had staggered dual exhausts and a tank-mounted speedometer, as well as a larger radiator.

Honda's sales of the VTX1800 by late 2003 were approaching 30,000 units. A new model was introduced in late 2003 for the 2004 model year; the VTX1800N took its Neo-Retro style cues from the limited edition Valkyrie Rune.

Honda added a more performance-oriented VTX1800F model in 2005, which had low-profile radial tires on cast alloy wheels with a five twin-spoke design, and also incorporated an LCD tachometer and clock into the tank-mounted speedometer. As one of the motorcycles that helped to define the Performance Cruiser market, the VTX1800F faced competition from the Yamaha Warrior, Victory Hammer, Kawasaki Mean Streak, and the Harley-Davidson Street Rod.

A VTX1800T Tourer model equipped with saddlebags holding 24 liters (0.85 cu ft) each, a windshield and a passenger backrest, was included in the 2007 line-up. 2008 was the final year for Honda's jumbo twin, available in three models: VTX1800N; VTX1800S; and VTX1800T.

== VTX1300 ==
VTX1300
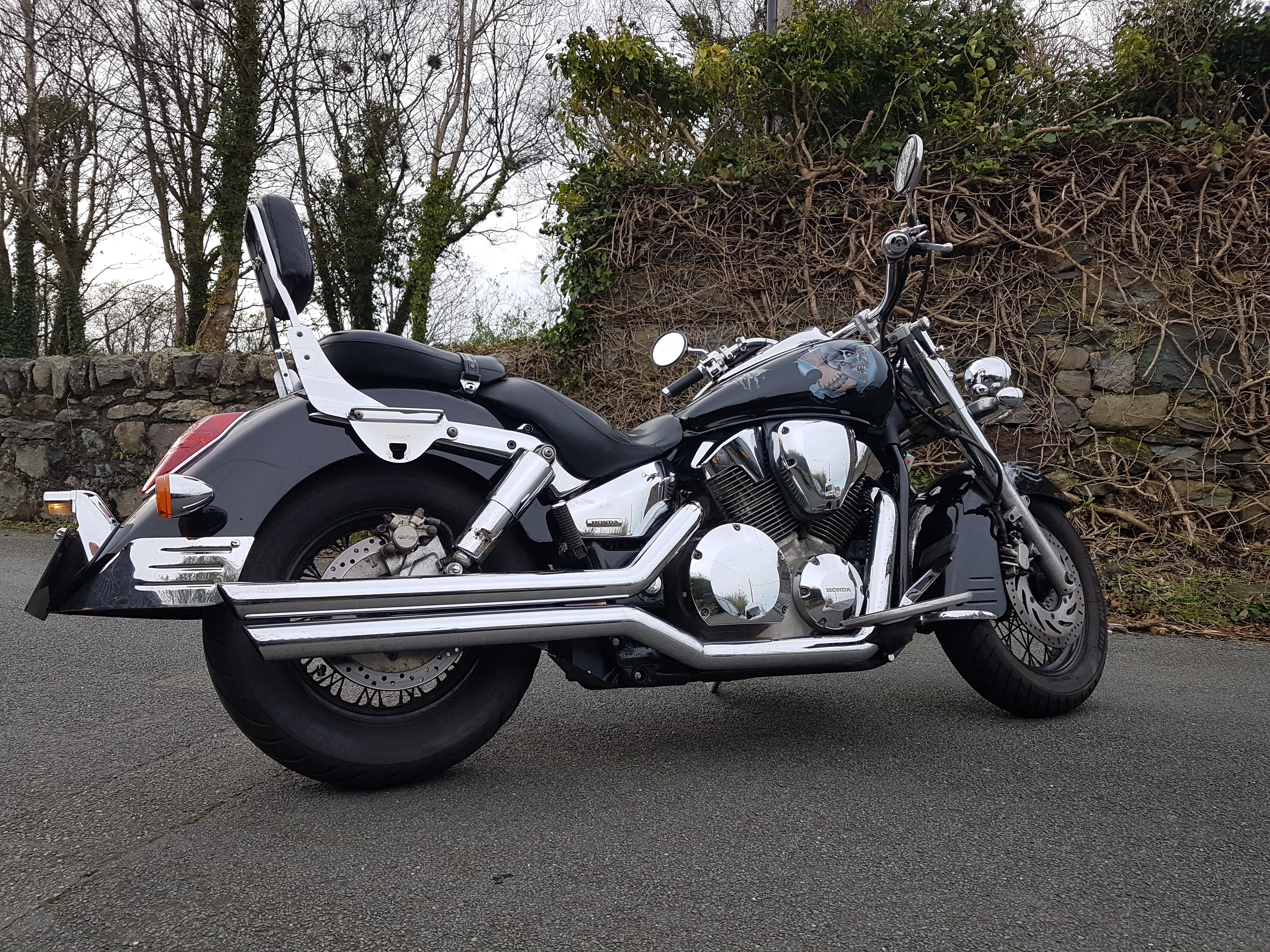
- 2007 VTX1300S
- Manufacturer: Honda
- Production: 2002-2009
- Assembly: Marysville, Ohio, United States
- Predecessor: VTX1800
- Successor: VT1300
- Class: Cruiser
- Engine: 1,312 cc (80.1 cu in) SOHC, three valves per cylinder, liquid-cooled 52° V-twin
- Bore / stroke: 89.5 mm × 104.3 mm (3.52 in × 4.11 in)
- Compression ratio: 9.2:1
- Power: 56.73–60.3 hp (42.30–44.97 kW) max at ~5,000 rpm (4 measurements)
- Torque: 70.63–77.4 ft⋅lb (95.76–104.94 N⋅m) max at ~3,000 rpm (4 meas.)
- Ignition type: Digital electronic
- Transmission: Shaft drive, 5-speed
- Frame type: Double-cradle steel tube
- Suspension: F: 41mm fork, 5.1 in (130 mm) travel R: Swingarm, dual shocks with adjustable preload, 3.6 in (91 mm) travel [type C] 3.7 in (94 mm) travel [R,S,T]
- Brakes: F: Single disc with twin-piston calipers R: Single disc with single-piston caliper
- Tires: F: 110/90-19 [type C]; 140/80-17 [R,S,T] R: 170/80-15
- Rake, trail: 32°/149 mm (5.9 in) [type C] 32°/144 mm (5.7 in) [R,S,T]
- Wheelbase: 65.45 in (1,662 mm) [type C] 65.70 in (1,669 mm) [R,S,T]
- Seat height: 27.46 in (697 mm) [type C] 27.35 in (695 mm) [R,S,T]
- Weight: 678–748 lb (308–339 kg) (wet)
- Fuel capacity: 4.76 US gallons (18.0 L; 3.96 imp gal)

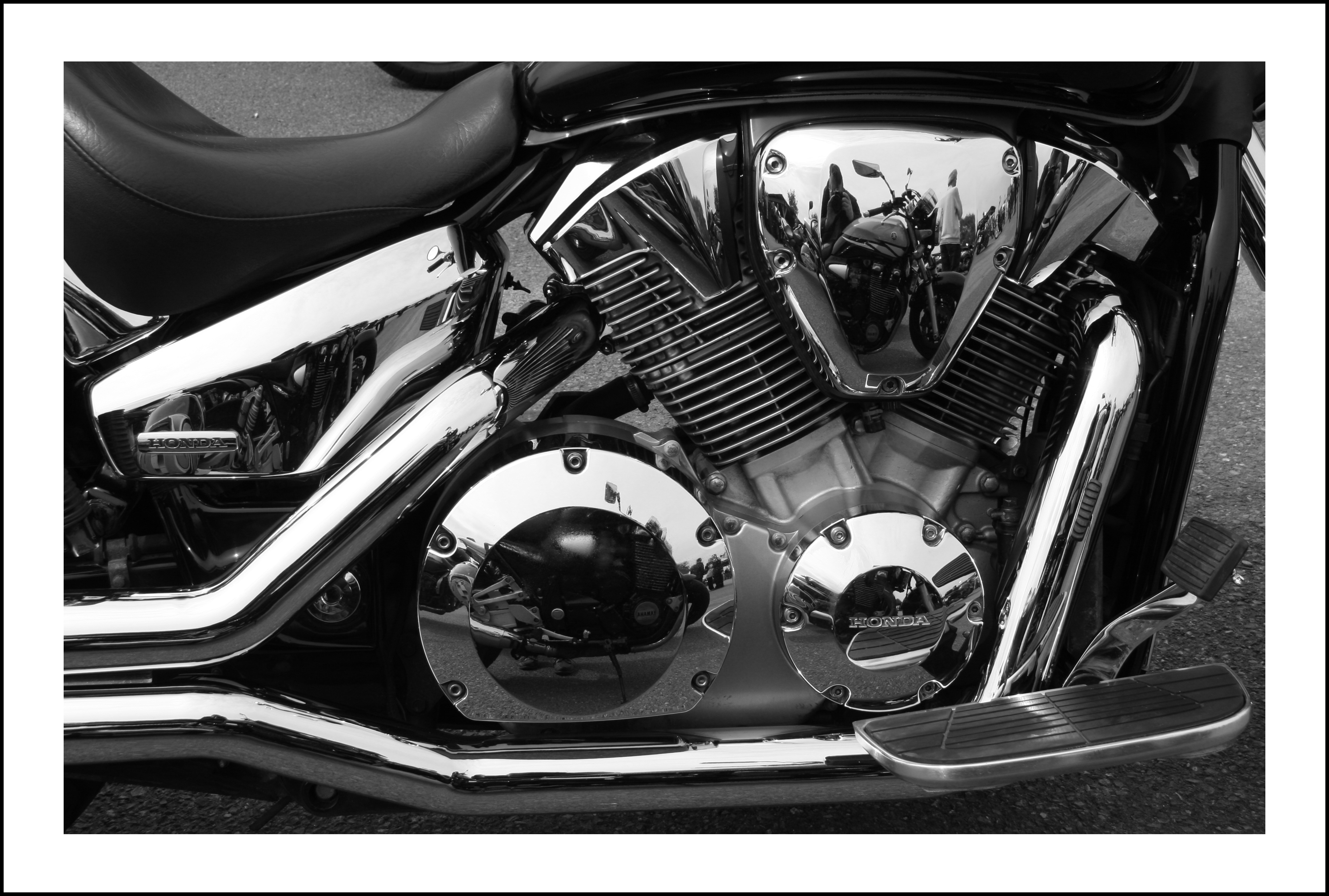
Honda VTX1300 motorcycle engine

In 2002 Honda made the VTX1300S available, as a 2003 model, with an all-new 1,312 cc (80.1 cu in) liquid-cooled V-twin engine in traditional cruiser bodywork, rolling on spoked wheels. It sold quickly, and by the close of 2003 sales totaled almost 12,000 units.

In contrast to the VTX1800 line, VTX1300 bikes used standard unlinked brakes, with a single large front disk, 336mm in diameter. The rear brake was a 296mm disc.

Although it was similar to the 1800, the 1300 was not the same engine with a smaller bore or shorter stroke, but a new design. The 1300 engine used a 38 mm constant velocity carburetor unlike the fuel injected 1800. The single carb had a manual choke for cold starts, and was heated by engine coolant to improve cold-weather operation. The configuration of the new powerplant was the same liquid-cooled overhead-cam 52-degree V-twin layout as its larger sibling, but the VTX1300 engine was designed around a single-pin crankshaft, unlike the 1800s dual-pin crank. As a result, the 1300 required dual two-axis primary counterbalancers to control engine vibration. The VTX1300 engine had a cable-operated clutch, instead of the hydraulic clutch of the VTX1800. The 1300 engine used an air injection system and catalytic converters, similar to the bigger engine, as well as a lean fuel-air mixture to control emissions.

The VTX1300 line employed the same two-into-two exhaust system across the board, as opposed to the model specific two-into-one system of the VTX1800C. In a road test on the Motorcycle USA website, editor Ken Hutchison observed that the VTX1300C had an "extra-muffled exhaust note that may be politically correct but it really detracts from the Big Twin experience potential buyers might be looking for." Nevertheless, Motorcyclist magazine's Art Friedman opined that the VTX1300 "sound is classic V-twin", and that the bike had more responsive handling as well as a smoother drivetrain than its 1800cc lookalike.

VTX1300 bikes came with the least possible instrumentation, one large analog speedometer (with a digital odometer) in a nacelle on top of the fuel tank, unaccompanied by so much as a clock or fuel gauge. The 2004 VTX1300S was joined by the lighter and shorter VTX1300C Custom with cast-alloy wheels, a drag-style handlebar, and without the floorboards and heel-and-toe shifter of the S model. The new C model also sold in large numbers in its first year, upwards of 11,000 units.

2005 saw the VTX1300 family grow to three models with the introduction of VTX1300R Retro, which combined traditional cruiser styling with cast-alloy wheels (and tubeless tires) in place of the wire wheels used on the otherwise identical VTX1300S. The R-model also did well on the showroom floor, with first-year sales over 8000 units. Honda continued on with those three models, type C, S and R, changing only the paintwork in 2006 and 2007.

Honda dropped the spoked-wheel VTX1300S in 2008, but maintained lineup at three models by adding the VTX1300T Tourer variant (with cast wheels). The Tourer was basically a type R bike equipped at the factory with what had been the three accessories most often added by Honda dealers; saddlebags holding 24 litres (0.85 cu ft) each, a windshield and a passenger backrest. In a Los Angeles Times road test, Susan Carpenter described the VTX1300T as a "Midwesterner's motorcycle", noting that many sales of the VTX1300 line were made in "corn country."

For 2008, the two-into-two exhaust system was redesigned to be more compact. 2009 was the final year for the VTX1300, available as type C, R and T models in new colors, but otherwise identical to the previous year.

Competitive models included the Yamaha DragStar 1100 (aka V Star 1100) and V Star 1300, the Suzuki Boulevard S83, the Harley-Davidson Sportster 1200 Custom, the Kawasaki Vulcan 900 Classic and Vulcan 1500 Classic.

Total sales for all types of VTX1300 cruisers amounted to 82,900 for all model years.

=== VT1300CX ===
VT1300C
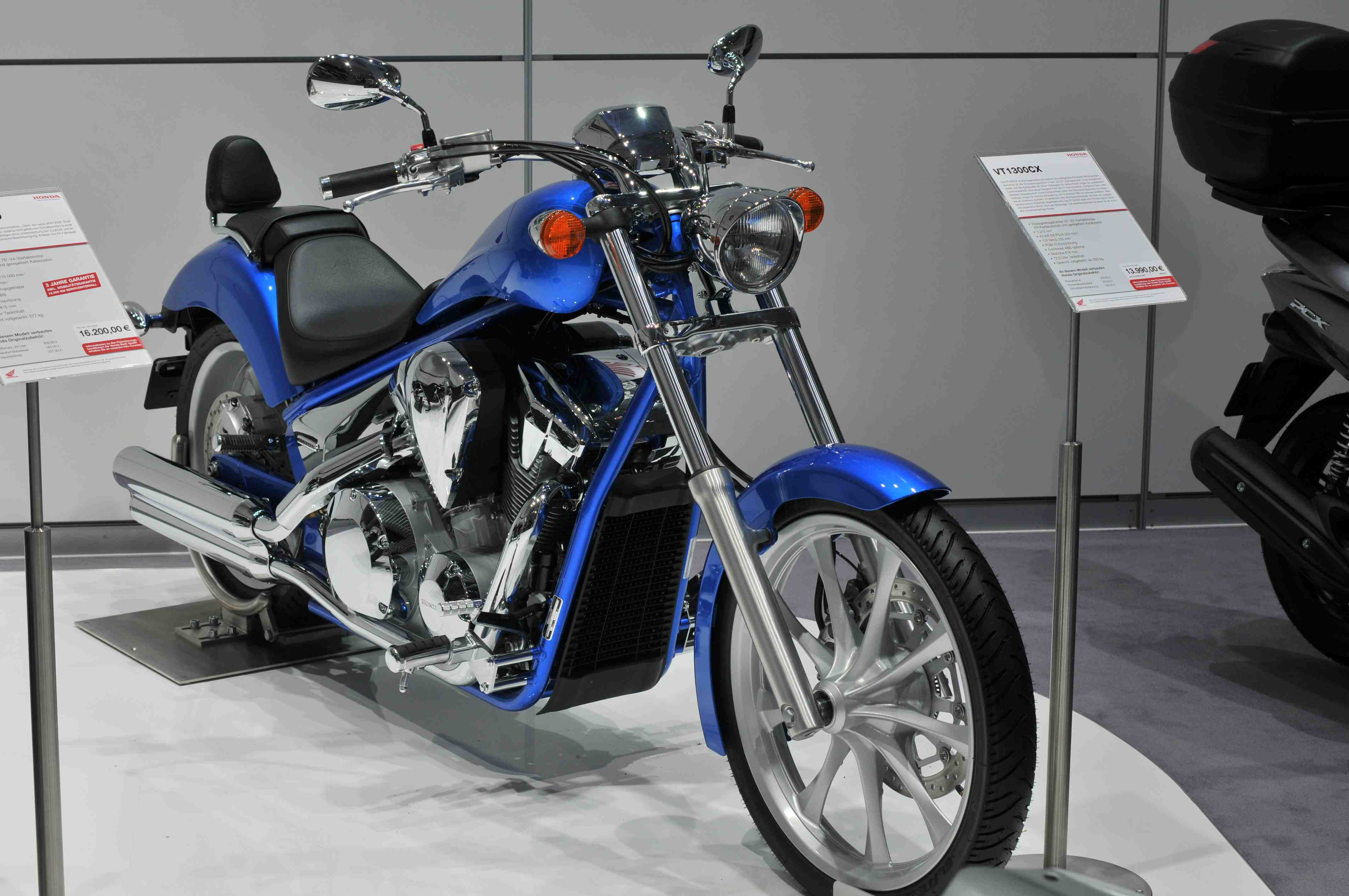
- Honda VT1300CX Fury at the 2011 Frankfurt Motor Show
- Manufacturer: Honda
- Also called: Fury [X], Sabre [S], Stateline [R], Interstate [T]
- Production: 2009—
- Assembly: Kumamoto Prefecture, Japan
- Predecessor: VTX1300
- Class: Cruiser
- Engine: 1,312 cc (80.1 cu in) SOHC, three valves per cylinder, liquid-cooled 52° V-twin
- Bore / stroke: 89.5 mm × 104.3 mm (3.52 in × 4.11 in)
- Compression ratio: 9.2:1
- Power: 57.0 hp (42.5 kW) @ 4,250 rpm (claimed); 56.5 hp (42.1 kW) @ 4,275 rpm (meas.)
- Torque: 79 ft⋅lb (107 N⋅m) @ 2,250 rpm (claimed); 72.4 ft⋅lb (98.2 N⋅m) @ 3,620 rpm (meas.)
- Ignition type: Digital electronic
- Transmission: Shaft drive, 5-speed
- Frame type: Double-cradle steel tube
- Suspension: F: 45mm fork [X], 41mm fork [S,R,T]; 4.0 in (100 mm) travel R: Aluminum swingarm, monoshock with adjustable damping and preload, 3.7 in (94 mm) travel [X]; Steel swingarm, monoshock w/ adj. preload, 3.9 in (99 mm) travel [S,R,T]
- Brakes: F: Single 336mm disc with twin-piston calipers R: Single 296mm disc with single-piston caliper, ABS & CBS optional
- Tires: F: 90/90-21 [X,S]; 140/80-17 [R,T] R: 200/50-18 [X]; 170/80-15 [S,R,T]
- Rake, trail: 38°/92 mm (3.6 in) [X] 33°/115–118 mm (4.5–4.6 in) [S,R,T]
- Wheelbase: 71.10–71.24 in (1,806–1,809 mm) [X] 70.00–70.30 in (1,778–1,786 mm) [S,R,T]
- Seat height: 26.70–26.90 in (678–683 mm)
- Weight: 659–728 lb (299–330 kg) (wet)
- Fuel capacity: 3.40 US gal (12.9 L; 2.83 imp gal) [X] 4.40 US gallons (16.7 L; 3.66 imp gal) [S,R,T]

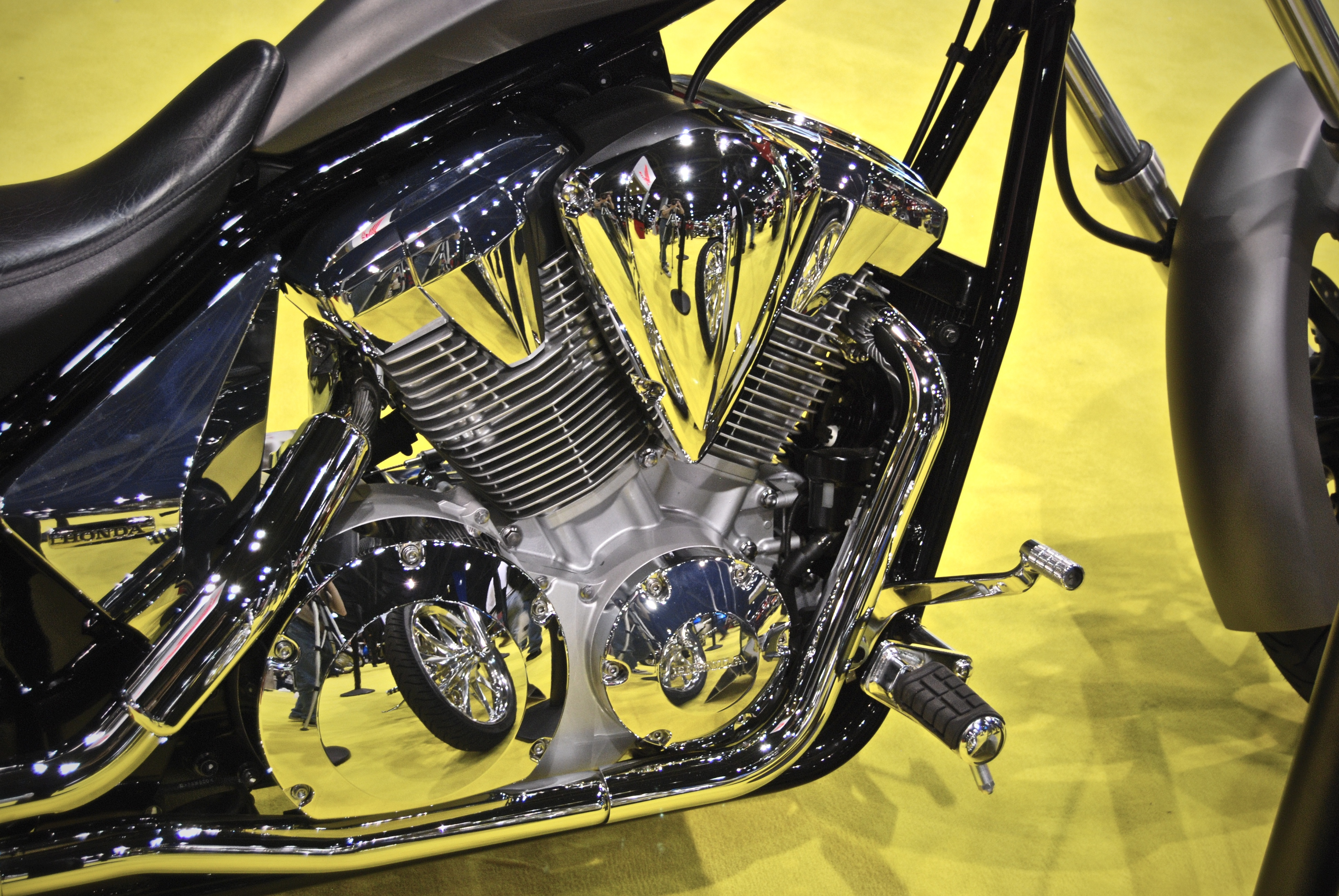
2010 Honda Fury engine at the 2009 Seattle International Motorcycle Show

In a series of introductions during 2009, Honda introduced the 2010 VT1300C Custom line to replace the VTX1300 line. In January 2009 Honda introduced the Fury VT1300CX at the New York International Motorcycle Show. The Sabre VT1300CS and Stateline VT1300CR were introduced at the 2009 Tokyo Motor Show, and the Interstate VT1300CT debuted at the Toronto Motorcycle Show in December of that year.

The new VT1300C bikes used updated versions of the VTX1300 powertrain and brakes; but with unusual frame geometry, new suspension components and bodywork designed collaboratively by Honda R&D Americas (HRA) and Honda's Asaka R&D Center (HGA) in Japan. The carburetor that had been used on the VTX1300 engines was replaced with fuel injection (PGM-FI) for the VT1300C, and the new engines also received new cam profiles and a redesigned exhaust system. Exhaust emission controls included secondary air injection, the PGM-FI system and two catalytic converters.

The Fury's design went beyond the domain of traditional Honda cruisers and onto full-out chopper turf, having austere bodywork on a faux-hardtail frame with a high-mounted steering head and long fork tubes that made the rake angle conspicuous at 38 degrees, The caster angle being 32 degrees with 6 degrees added into the steering yokes, A wide rear tire was paired with a narrow front wheel, and the two were spanned by the longest wheelbase for any Honda production motorcycle. Honda also offered an extra-cost version of the Fury with CBS and ABS. There were only cosmetic changes to the VT1300CX (aka VT13CX) model in years 2011 through 2013, and the Fury remains in the Honda lineup for 2014.

While the Fury name was not used in all markets, Honda sold the VT1300CX internationally, including Australia, New Zealand, India, South Africa, the UK and Northern Ireland, as well as the UAE and the GCC states. Motorcycle Cruiser magazine named the Honda Fury as their "2010 Cruiser of the Year." In 2011, the Visordown website included the Fury in their list of "Top 7 cruisers with huge engines", despite the fact that the Honda's engine was the smallest of the lot.

Beyond the chopper-style Fury, the VT1300C line offered three conventional cruiser models for 2010, all of which remain in the lineup for 2014: Sabre, Interstate and Stateline. Honda previously used both the Interstate and Sabre names for other models, the most recent being the VT1100C2 Shadow Sabre.

In contrast to the Fury, the 2010 Sabre emphasized function over form with a less extreme seating position, narrower handlebar and lower steering head, making the VT1300CS (aka VT13CS) a fairly typical cruiser design, competing with other mid-size cruisers such as the Star Stryker. Front forks on the Sabre were shorter as a consequence of the lower steering head, and so they did not need the large-diameter tubes used on the Fury. The Sabre had slightly more travel in its rear mono-shock and a steel swingarm rather than aluminum, plus a larger fuel tank that incorporated an instrument panel. The VT1300CS wheelbase was about an inch shorter that the Fury's (but 4.5 inches longer than the old VTX1300C).

Of the three 2010 cruisers, The VT1300CR Stateline was the entry-level bike, by virtue of its lower price. It was also a more touring oriented bike, thanks to its wider seat, pull-back handlebars and larger, more valanced fenders. The Stateline used the same suspension and fuel tank as the Sabre. The VT1300CT Interstate used the same bodywork and running gear as the Stateline, but with additional amenities for touring, such as a windshield, saddlebags, floorboards for the rider and covers for the fork tubes. ABS was not available on the 2010 Interstate, the only model in the VT1300C line to not offer that option, however, Honda included the ABS option starting with the 2012 model year. The VT1300CT Interstate's competitors were other mid-size Baggers, such as the Yamaha V Star 1300 tourer and Suzuki Boulevard C90T touring cruiser.

== See also ==
- Honda Fury
- Honda Shadow
- Honda Valkyrie
