= Yamaha DragStar 950 =

DragStar 950
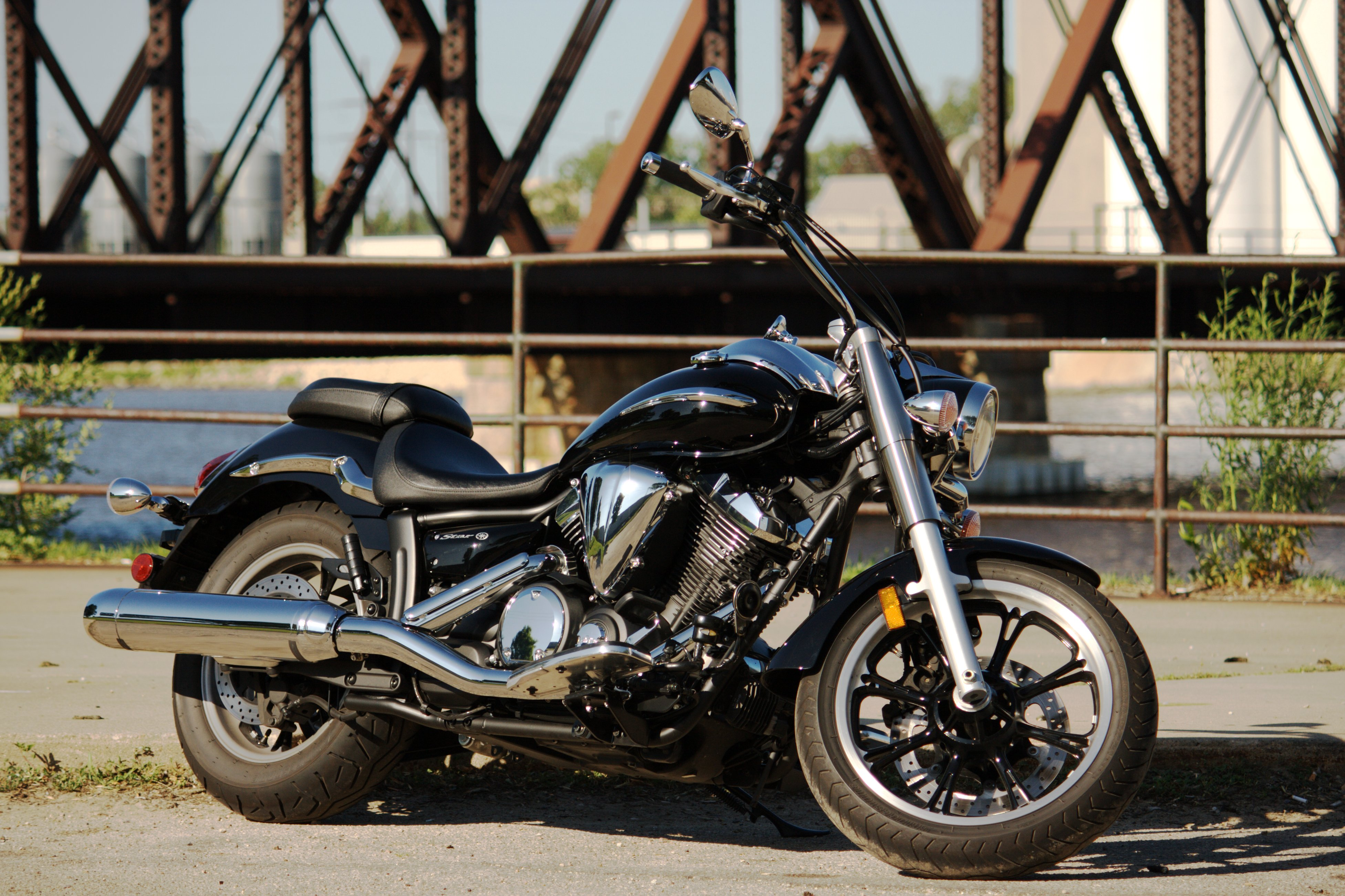
- Manufacturer: Star Motorcycles
- Also called: V Star 950, XVS950/XVS950A Midnight Star
- Parent company: Yamaha Motor Company
- Production: 2009–2017
- Class: Cruiser
- Engine: 942 cc (57.5 cu in) air-cooled, fuel-injected 60° V-twin; SOHC, 4 valves/cylinder
- Bore / stroke: 85.0 mm × 83.0 mm (3.35 in × 3.27 in)
- Compression ratio: 9.0:1
- Top speed: 90 mph (140 km/h)
- Power: 50 hp (37 kW) at 5,600 rpm
- Torque: 58.2 lb⋅ft (78.9 N⋅m) at 3,500 rpm
- Ignition type: Transistor controlled ignition
- Transmission: 5-speed; multi-plate wet clutch
- Frame type: Double-cradle steel
- Suspension: Front: telescopic fork, 5.3 in (130 mm) travel; Rear: single shock, 4.3 in (110 mm) travel
- Brakes: Hydraulic disc; 320 mm (13 in) front, 298 mm (11.7 in) rear
- Tires: Front: 130/70-18M/C 63H; Rear: 170/70-16M/C 75H
- Rake, trail: 32.0°, 5.7 in (140 mm)
- Wheelbase: 66.3 in (168 cm)
- Dimensions: L: 95.9 in (244 cm); W: 39.4 in (100 cm); H: 42.5 in (108 cm)
- Seat height: 26.5 in (67 cm)
- Weight: Standard: 613 lb (278 kg); Touring 657 lb (298 kg) (wet)
- Fuel capacity: 4.4 US gal (17 L; 3.7 imp gal)
- Fuel consumption: 47 mpg_{‑US} (5.0 L/100 km; 56 mpg_{‑imp})
- Related: Yamaha DragStar 250, Yamaha DragStar 650, Yamaha DragStar 1100, Yamaha V Star 1300

The Yamaha DragStar 950 (also known as the V Star 950 and the XVS950/XVS950A Midnight Star) is a cruiser motorcycle produced by Yamaha Motor Company. Introduced in 2009 with a base MSRP of US$7,890, the DragStar 950 has a 942 cc (57.5 cu in), fuel injected V-twin engine with a 60° V angle, which produces approximately 50 horsepower (37 kW) and 58.2 pound-feet (78.9 N⋅m) of torque. The transmission is a five-speed manual with a multi-plate wet clutch and final belt drive. The bike was designed as an entry-level cruiser motorcycle and is available in standard and touring versions.

The DragStar 950 has received generally positive reviews and was awarded V Twin Magazine's "Metric of the Year" award for 2009.
