= Honda Fury =

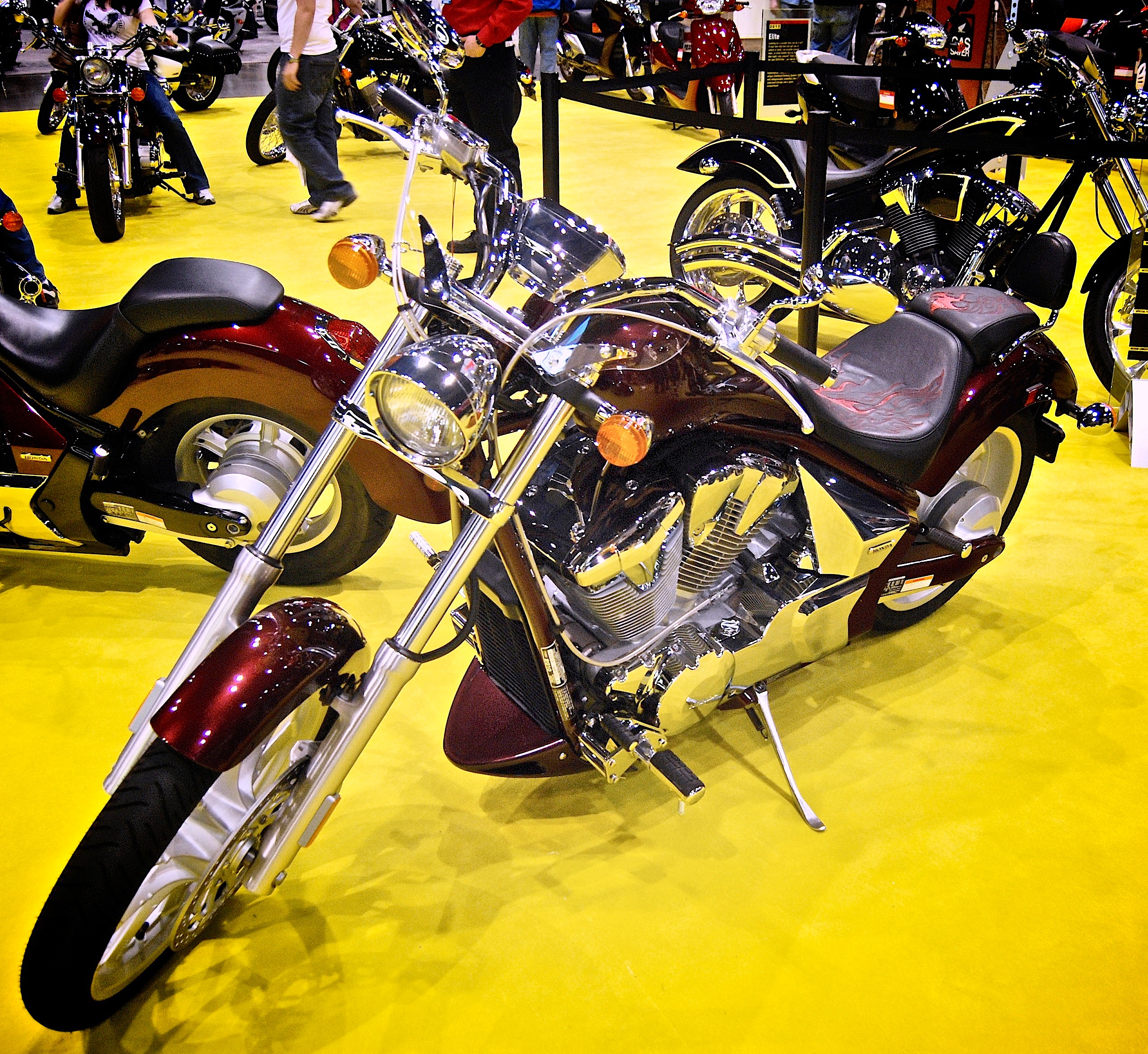
- 2010 Fury at the 2009 Seattle International Motorcycle Show
- Manufacturer: Honda
- Also called: VT1300CX
- Production: 2009–present
- Assembly: Kumamoto Prefecture, Japan
- Predecessor: VTX1300
- Class: Chopper
- Engine: 1,312 cc (80.1 cu in) SOHC, three valves per cylinder, liquid-cooled 52° V-twin
- Bore / stroke: 89.5 mm × 104.3 mm (3.52 in × 4.11 in)
- Compression ratio: 9.2 to 1
- Power: 57.3 hp (42.7 kW) @ 4,300 rpm (rear wheel)
- Torque: 79 ft⋅lb (107 N⋅m) @ 2,250 rpm (claimed); 72.9 ft⋅lb (98.8 N⋅m) @ 3,700 rpm (rear wheel)
- Ignition type: Digital electronic
- Transmission: Five-speed manual
- Frame type: Double-cradle steel tube
- Suspension: F: 45mm fork, 4.0 in (100 mm) travel R: Aluminum swingarm, monoshock with adjustable damping and preload, 3.7 in (94 mm) travel
- Brakes: F: Single 336mm disc with twin-piston calipers R: Single 296mm disc with single-piston caliper, ABS & CBS optional
- Tires: F: 90/90-21 R: 200/50-18
- Rake, trail: 32°/92 mm (3.6 in)
- Wheelbase: 71.24 in (1,809 mm)
- Seat height: 26.70–26.90 in (678–683 mm)
- Weight: 663 lb (301 kg)(wet); 681 lb (309 kg) ABS (wet)
- Fuel capacity: 3.40 US gallons (12.9 L; 2.83 imp gal)
- Fuel consumption: 40 mpg_{‑US} (5.9 L/100 km; 48 mpg_{‑imp})
- Related: VT1300CS, VT1300CR, VT1300CT

The Honda Fury was the first production chopper from a major motorcycle manufacturer (Honda). In a break with tradition, the Fury was the first chopper to have an anti-lock braking system The Fury's styling has been likened to custom-made choppers from Paul Teutul Sr. or Arlen Ness. The Fury has been sold not only in North America, but internationally as well, although in some markets Honda eschewed the Fury name and offered the bike simply by its model ID: VT1300CX.

== Development ==
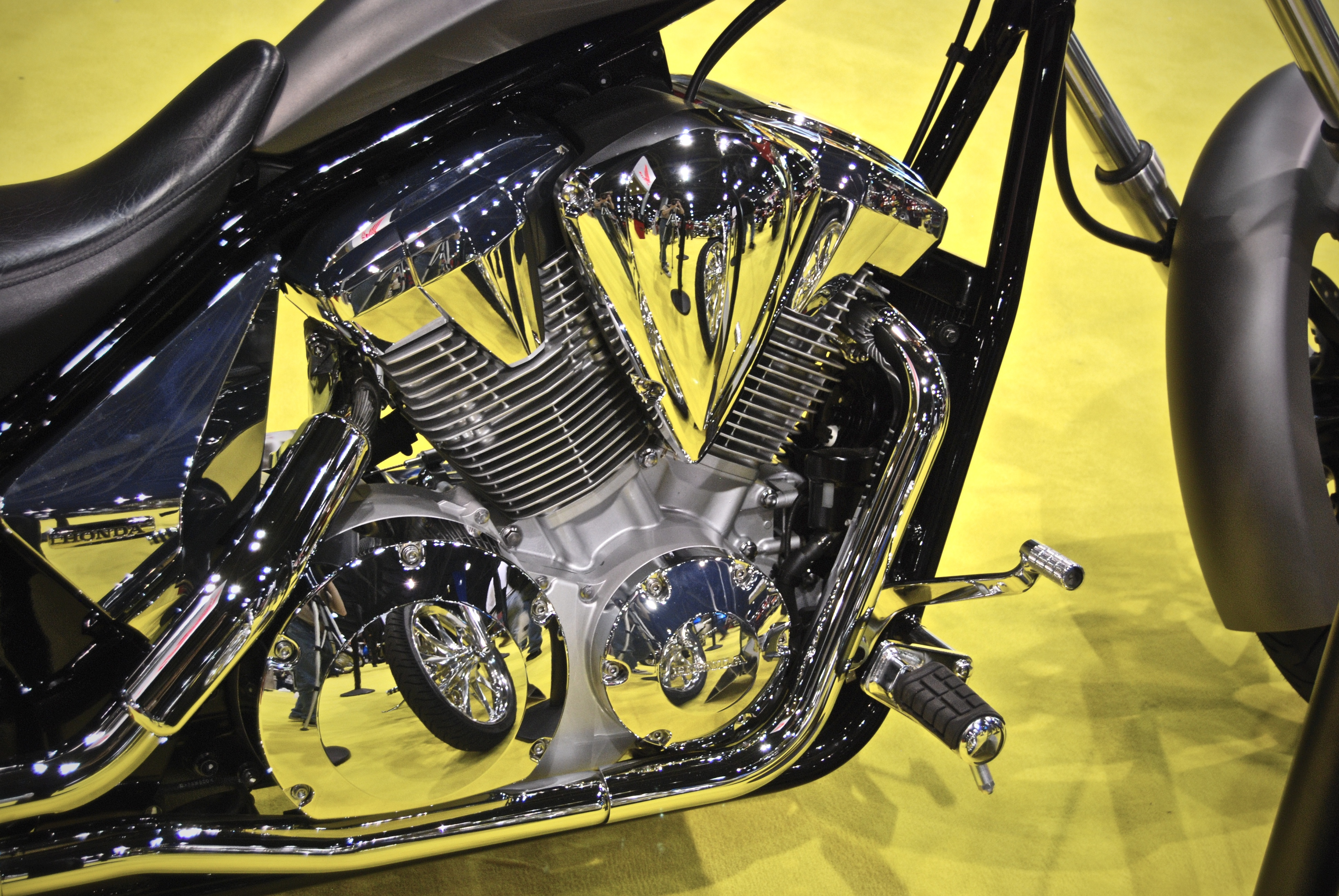
Honda Fury engine at the 2009 Seattle International Motorcycle Show

The original concept for the Honda Fury was first conceptualized by Jesse James and crew at West Coast Choppers. Although the final form of that concept is lost today, we know the production model Fury's distinctive frame, bodywork and components for its front and rear suspension were designed by a team of stylists from Honda R&D Americas (HRA) working with engineers from Honda's Asaka R&D Center (HGA) in Japan. Honda's design goal was to lift the chopper type of motorcycle from a niche market item to the quality, quantity and affordability of a mass-produced product. Archetypal chopper styling originated in the Fury's spidery, long wheelbase frame and faux-hardtail rear end. Its frame geometry raised the steering head, stretched the fork tubes, and gave the Fury a radical aspect and a longer, more raked out appearance, all while actually still using the same rake angle (32 degrees) as its forerunners, the Honda VTX series.

Preliminary specifications showing that the Fury had a rake (caster angle) of 38 degrees were later corrected to show the angle as 32 degrees.

Some design elements of the Fury, such as its narrow 21 inch front wheel and very low seat height, are found not only on choppers but appear routinely on cruiser motorcycles as well. For instance, the contemporaneous 750 cc Honda Shadow, updated in 2007 as the Spirit C2 model, had the same front wheel dimensions as the Fury, and an even lower seat height.

The Fury used an updated version of the VTX1300 powertrain and brakes, replacing the 38 mm CV carburetor of the VTX1300 engine with fuel injection (PGM-FI) using a single 38 mm throttle body. The Fury's undersquare engine also received modified cams and cylinder heads as well as a redesigned exhaust system. The fuel injection system was part of the engine's exhaust emission controls, in addition to a secondary air injection system and two catalytic converters; Honda also produced a state-specific version of the Fury to meet the California Air Resources Board emissions standards.

Engineers paid particular attention to engine cooling, in order to make the radiator and its hoses as inconspicuous as possible, yet still function effectively. This was achieved by running the top radiator hose underneath a valve cover, and by situating a thin radiator between the downtubes of the double-cradle frame. The Fury was given a five-speed transmission and a shaft-drive system similar to its VTX predecessors, but the shaft was enclosed by an aluminum swingarm assembly unique to the Fury to make it less visible to the untrained eye.

== Launch ==
In January 2009 Honda introduced the Fury VT1300CX at the New York International Motorcycle Show, and first deliveries were in May 2009, for the 2010 model year. The Fury was among the earliest to be manufactured at Honda's completely new motorcycle factory in Kumamoto, Japan, and exported to America.

The Fury was generally well received; Motorcycle Cruiser magazine named the Honda Fury as their "2010 Cruiser of the Year," after editorializing that choppers cannot be mass-produced, and that the Fury was in actuality a cruiser. The Visordown website included the Fury in their list of "Top 7 cruisers with huge engines," despite the fact that the Honda's displacement was relatively modest. But some reviewers had difficulties reconciling the form-over-function chopper ethos with a motor company known for engineering excellence. In The Telegraph, the late Kevin Ash wrote that "choppers exist outside the realm of motorcycles I understand." Dexter Ford said in The New York Times that the one "thing wrong with the Fury is the same thing that is so right about it: it’s a Honda."

== Competition ==
Motorcycles such as the Honda Fury are sometimes categorized by the mutually exclusive terms factory custom, referring to a major manufacturer's attempt to follow the chopper fad. Harley-Davidson had taken the first steps in the 70s and 80s, but the motorcycle press generally acknowledged that Honda's effort was the most daring stylistically. The Fury's competitors included the Harley-Davidson Rocker, Yamaha Star Raider and Victory Vegas.

== Related models ==
In April 2010, one year after the initial release of the Fury, Honda released three new models as sister bikes to the Fury. These new models were the VT1300CS Sabre (no relation to older Honda Sabre models), VT1300CR Stateline and VT1300CT Interstate. The new Sabre sported a larger 4.4 gallon fuel tank, tank mounted speedometer, five spoke wheels and a longer, lower appearance when compared the high-necked frame of the Fury. The Stateline further moved away from the Fury design by adding larger, more highway friendly front rubber, more pullback on the handle bars and classic, cruiser style fenders. The Interstate took the changes from both the Sabre and Stateline and added more pullback on narrower handle bars, floorboards in lieu of foot pegs, hard saddlebags and a large touring style windscreen.

== Model history ==
Honda has continued to produce the Fury essentially unchanged since the 2010 model, other than annual paintwork revamps. The Fury remains in the lineup as of 2024.

=== Model name ===
Honda has sold the VT1300CX worldwide, including Australia, New Zealand, India, South Africa, the UK and Northern Ireland, as well as the UAE and the GCC states. The Fury name was not used in some of these markets.

The model name Fury had previously been used by Royal Enfield for a variety of motorcycle models produced at different times. The BSA Fury was a prototype motorcycle manufactured in 1970 but it never went into commercial production due to financial collapse of the BSA Group.
