= Star Motorcycles =

Division of Yamaha Motor Corporation, USA

Star Motorcycles logo

Star Motorcycles was a U.S.-specific brand of Yamaha Motor Company used on Yamaha's cruiser motorcycles.

== History ==
In 1994 Yamaha announced the creation of Star Motorcycles, a new standalone brand name for its cruiser series of motorcycles in the American market. Although a separate brand, Star motorcycles would continue to be sold at Yamaha dealerships. In other markets the same bikes would still be sold as Yamahas. In 2006 the brand was expanded to being its own company, although Yamaha still handled production and distribution. The brand was operated out of the Yamaha Motor Corporation, USA offices in Cypress, California. The motorcycles were designed in the United States.

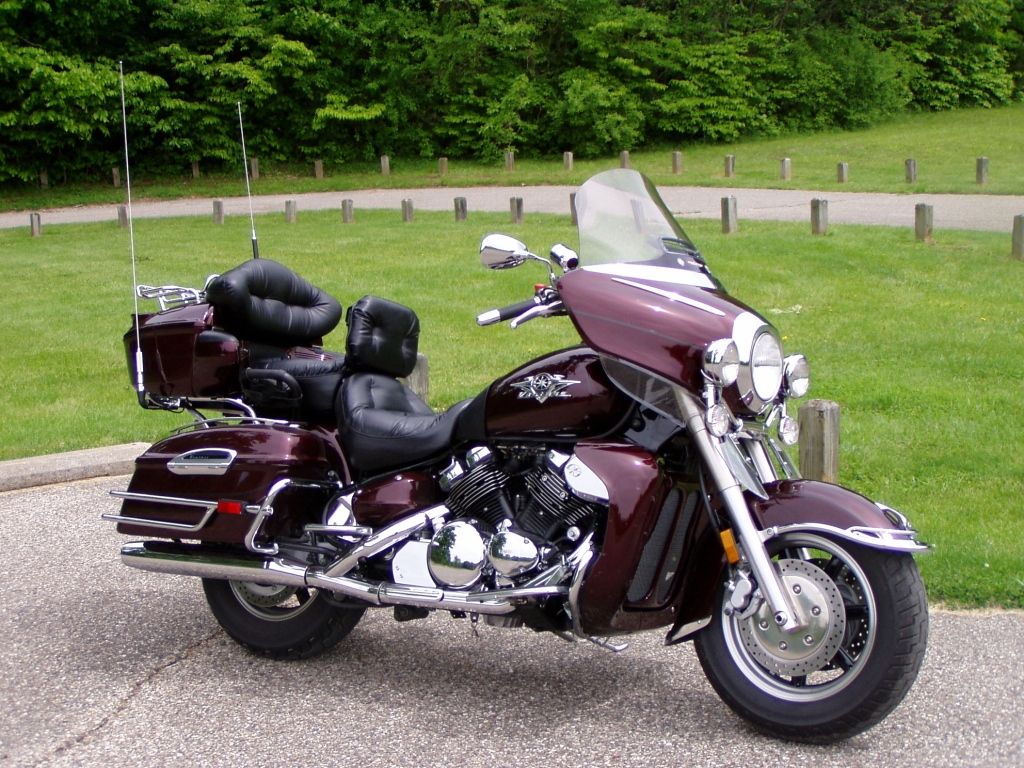
2006 Royal Star Venture

In 2016 Yamaha announced they would be dropping the moniker Star and reverted to selling under the Yamaha name.

== Models ==
- Bolt
  - Star Bolt
  - Bolt R-Spec
- Royal Star
  - Royal Star Tour Deluxe
  - Royal Star Venture
- Stratoliner
  - Stratoliner Delux
  - Stratoliner
  - Stratoliner S
- Roadliner

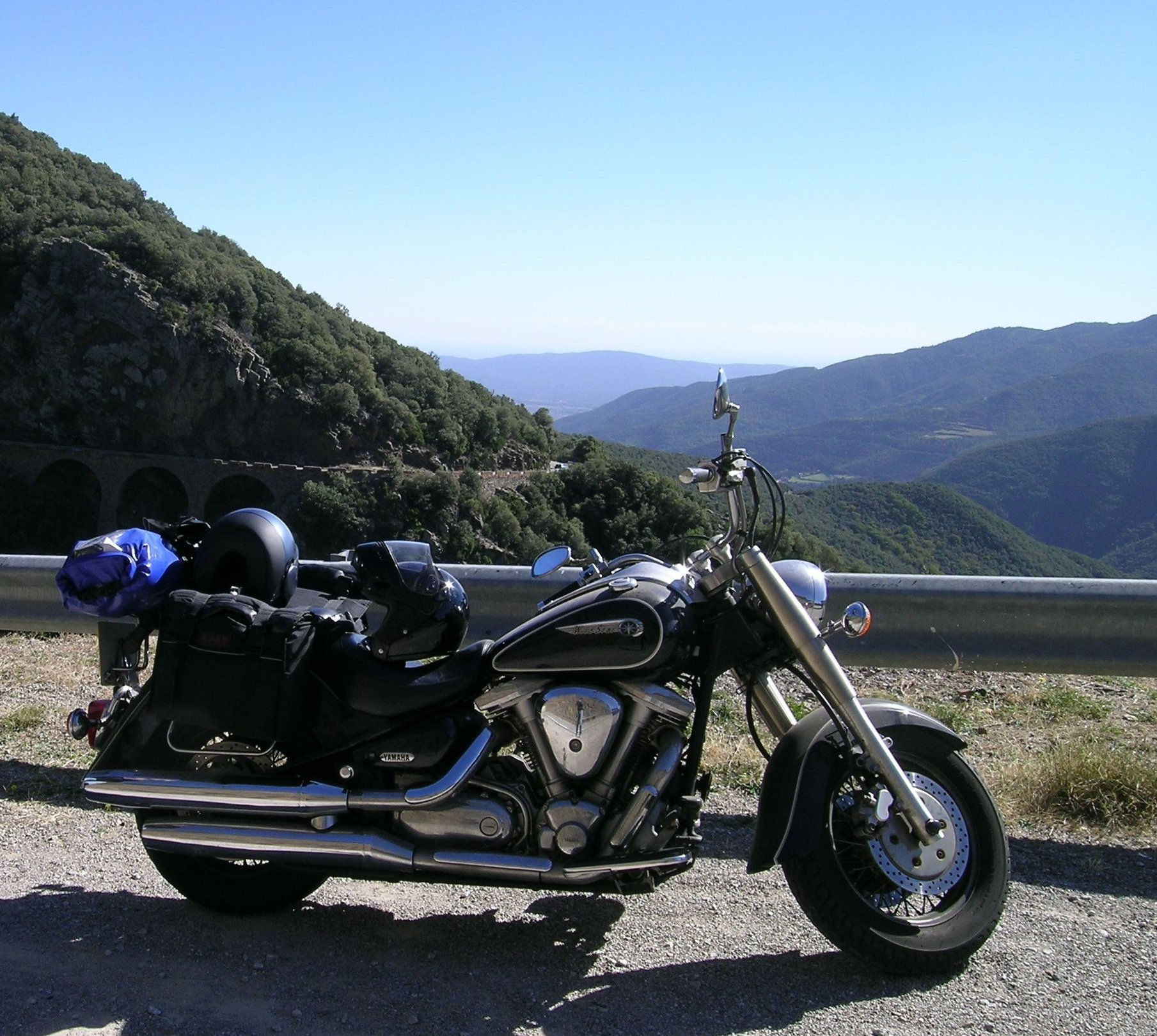
Yamaha XV1600A Wildstar/Roadstar

  - Roadliner / XV1900A
  - Roadliner Midnight
  - Midnight Star
  - Roadliner S / XV1900AS
  - Raider
- Road Star
  - Road Star
  - Road Star S
  - Road Star Silverado
  - Road Star Silverado S
- DragStar / V-Star / XVS
  - DragStar 125
  - DragStar 250 / V Star 250 XVS250
  - DragStar 400
  - DragStar 650 / V Star Classic XVS650A
  - DragStar 650 / V Star Custom XVS650
  - DragStar 650 / V Star Silverado
  - DragStar 950 / V Star 950
  - DragStar 950 Tourer / V Star 950 Tourer
  - DragStar 1100 / V Star 1100 Classic XVS1100A
  - DragStar 1100 / V Star 1100 Custom XVS1100
  - DragStar 1100 / V Star 1100 Silverado
  - V Star 1300 / XVS1300A
  - V Star 1300 / XVS1300AW(C)
  - V Star 1300 Tourer
- Stryker
- Warrior
  - Midnight Warrior
  - Warrior
- V-Max
- XV19

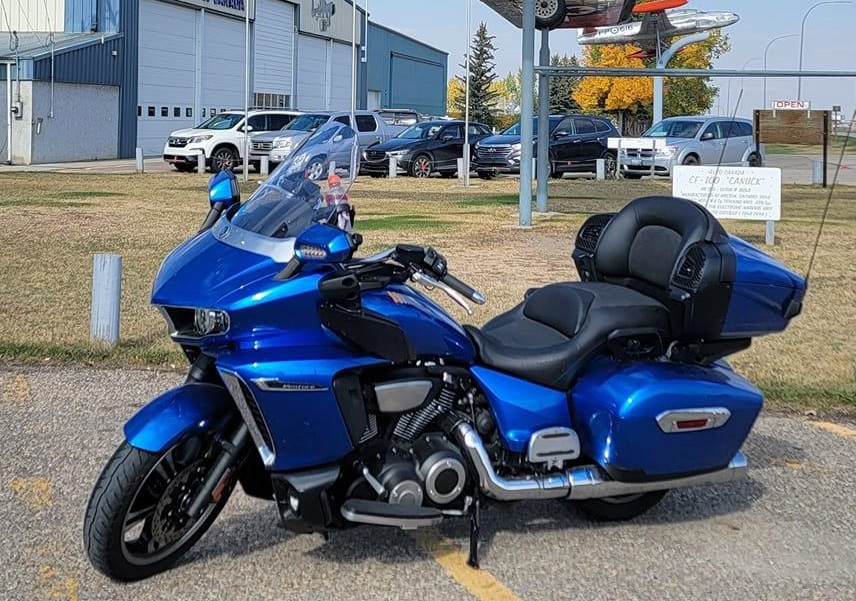
2021 Yamaha Star Venture TC

  - XV19 Star Eluder (base and GT)
  - XV19 Star Venture (base and Transcontinental)
