= Yamaha V Star 1300 =

Yamaha V-Star 1300
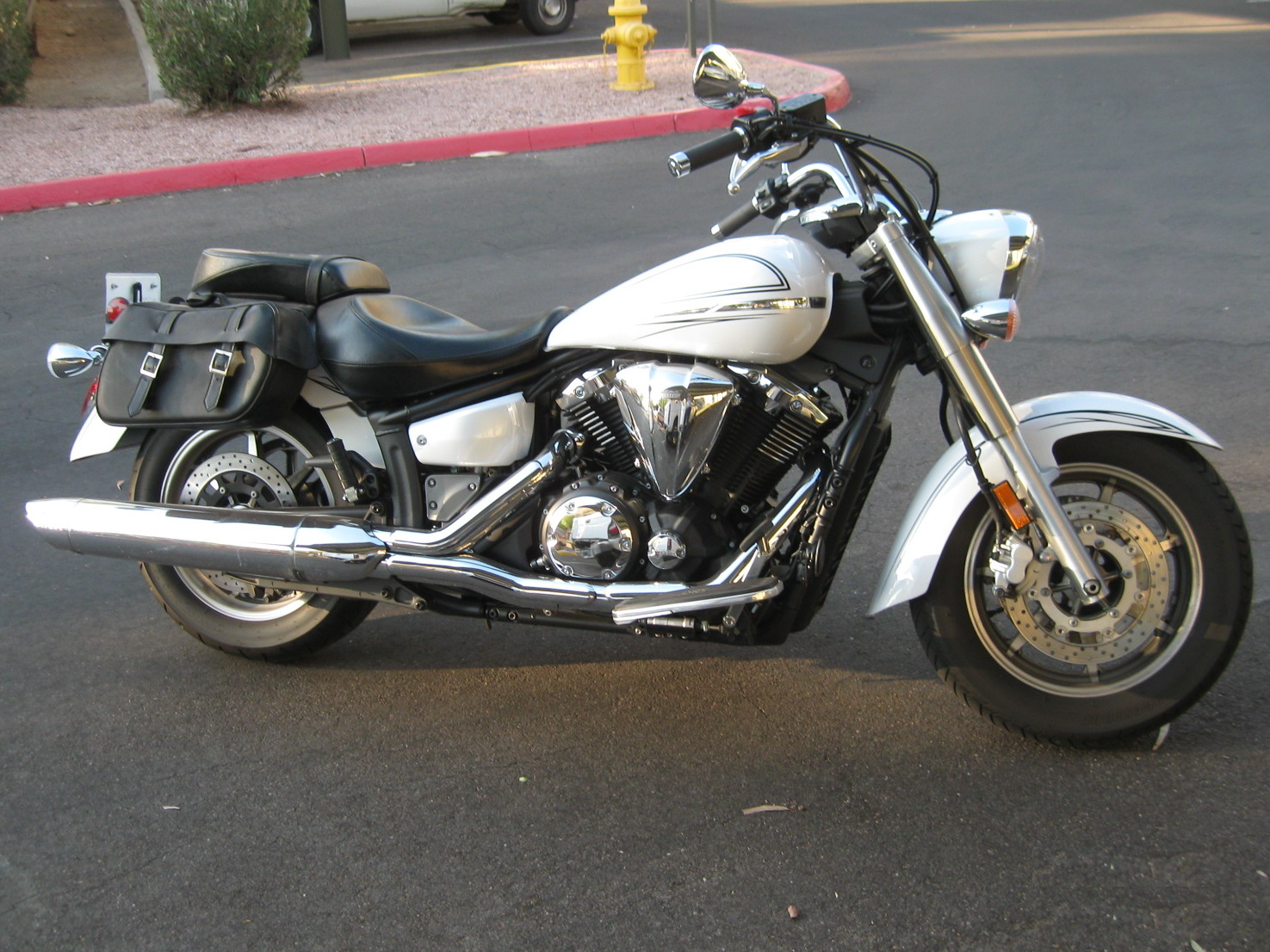
- Manufacturer: Yamaha Motor Company
- Also called: XVS13AW(C), XVS1300A Midnight Star
- Production: 2007 - 2017
- Predecessor: Yamaha V-Star 1100
- Class: Cruiser
- Engine: 1,304 cc (79.6 cu in) 4-stroke SOHC 4 valves per cylinder V-twin liquid cooled
- Bore / stroke: 100 mm × 83 mm (3.9 in × 3.3 in)
- Compression ratio: 9.5:1
- Top speed: 126 mph (203 km/h)
- Power: Approximately 70 hp (52 kW)
- Torque: 81.8 lb⋅ft (110.9 N⋅m) @ 4,000 rpm
- Transmission: Constant mesh 5 speed
- Frame type: Double cradle
- Suspension: Front telescoping fork Rear swingarm
- Brakes: Front: dual disc (298 mm); Rear: single disc (298 mm)
- Tires: Front: 130/90-16; Rear: 170/70B-16
- Rake, trail: 32º, 145 mm
- Wheelbase: 66.5 in (1,690 mm)
- Dimensions: L: 2,490 mm (98 in); W: 980 mm (39 in); H: 1,115 mm (43.9 in)
- Seat height: 715 mm (28.1 in)
- Weight: 283 kg (624 lb) (dry); 303 kg (668 lb) (wet)
- Fuel capacity: 18.5 L (4.1 imp gal; 4.9 US gal)
- Related: Yamaha DragStar 1100 (Yamaha V-Star 1100); Yamaha DragStar 950 (Yamaha V-Star 950); Yamaha DragStar 650 (Yamaha V-Star 650)

The Yamaha V Star 1300 (also known as XVS1300A Midnight Star and XVS13AW(C)) is a cruiser motorcycle produced from 2007 to 2017 by Yamaha Motor Company. It has a fuel injected 1,304 cc (79.6 cu in) V-twin engine, with a 60° V angle, which produces approximately 72.5 horsepower (54.1 kW), and 81.8 pound-feet (110.9 N⋅m) of torque. The transmission is a five-speed manual with a multi-plate wet clutch and belt drive. The bike was designed as a mid-to-high level production cruiser motorcycle and is available in standard and touring versions.
