= Roadliner =

Roadliner can mean:

- Daimler Roadliner - a single deck bus or coach chassis built by Daimler between 1962 and 1972
- Yamaha XV1900A motorcycle, also called Star Roadliner (US), Star Stratoliner (US) or Yamaha Midnight Star (UK)
