= Yamaha DragStar 250 =

Yamaha motorcycle

XVS250
- Manufacturer: Yamaha Motor Company
- Also called: Yamaha V Star 250 - XVS250
- Production: since 2001
- Predecessor: Virago 250 / XV250
- Class: Cruiser
- Engine: 249 cc, air-cooled, SOHC, 60-degree V-twin
- Top speed: 85 miles per hour (137 km/h) (claimed)
- Weight: 302 lb (137 kg) (dry)
- Fuel consumption: 78 mpg_{‑US} (33 km/L)

The Yamaha DragStar 250 (also known as the V Star 250 and the XVS250) is a motorcycle produced by Yamaha Motor Company.

== V Star 250 Replaces Virago 250 ==
In the 2008 model overview, the Virago 250 has been replaced with the V Star 250, but the specifications remain similar to the Virago 250.

== See also ==
- Yamaha DragStar
- Yamaha DragStar 650 - XVS650/XVS650A
- Yamaha DragStar 1100 - XVS1100/XVS1100A
