= Yamaha XJ1100 =

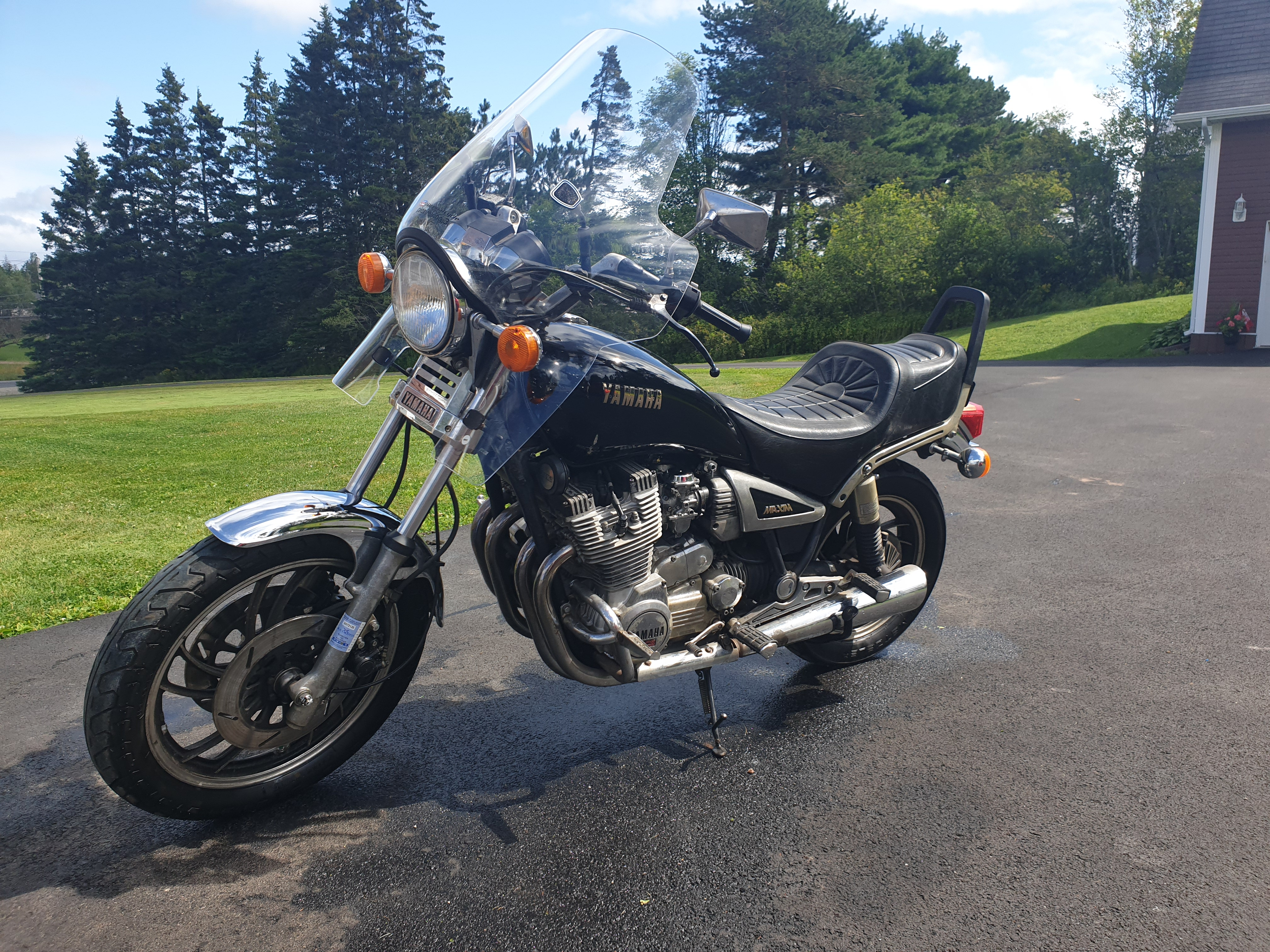
- XJ1100 with Windshield
- Manufacturer: Yamaha
- Production: 1982 in US, 83-84 in Canada
- Class: Standard, Cruiser
- Engine: 1,101 cc (67.2 cu in), four stroke, DOHC, transverse four
- Bore / stroke: 71.5 mm × 68.6 mm (2.81 in × 2.70 in)
- Compression ratio: 9.0:1
- Transmission: 5-speed manual, shaft drive
- Fuel capacity: 13 L (2.9 imp gal; 3.4 US gal)

The Yamaha XJ1100 is a Japanese standard motorcycle that was produced for only one year in 1982 in the US and 1983–84 in Canada. This motorcycle employed almost the same motor as its predecessor, the XS 11. The motor was a four-stroke, transverse-mounted four-cylinder engine with dual overhead cams. Its 1101cc engine was making 95 hp at the crank, paired with a 5-speed gearbox and shaft drive.

== History ==
The XJ1100 was produced for only one year after being completely phased out. The bike directly competed with the other three big manufactures from Japan in the big-bore engine cruiser market, as well as other cruisers like Harley Davidson indirectly. Unlike the XS11 that was preceded this bike, it employs a system called YICS which increases fuel efficiency as it promotes better combustion.

== Specifications ==
The motorcycle's 1,101 cc (67.2 cu in) engine uses 4x34mm Mikuni carburetor for its fuel delivery with a 9.0:1 compression ratio. The bore and stroke are 75.5x68.6 mm respectively. This engine's 95 hp is made at 8,000rpm and 65 ft-lb of torque made at 6500rpm, which is made possible with the inline-four unlike their more popular competitor Harley Davidson who employed v-twin motors with similar or larger displacement engines.

== Sales ==
Unlike the XS11, there was only one style and trim available for the XJ1100 called the Maxim. Usually European and North American models vary slightly in the size of the gas tank. The XJ1100 is one of the few bikes that maintains its 13-liter gas tank between continents. Possibly because of the lack of options from the factory, this could be one of the key factors that led to low sales of the bike.
