= Yamaha XV1600A =

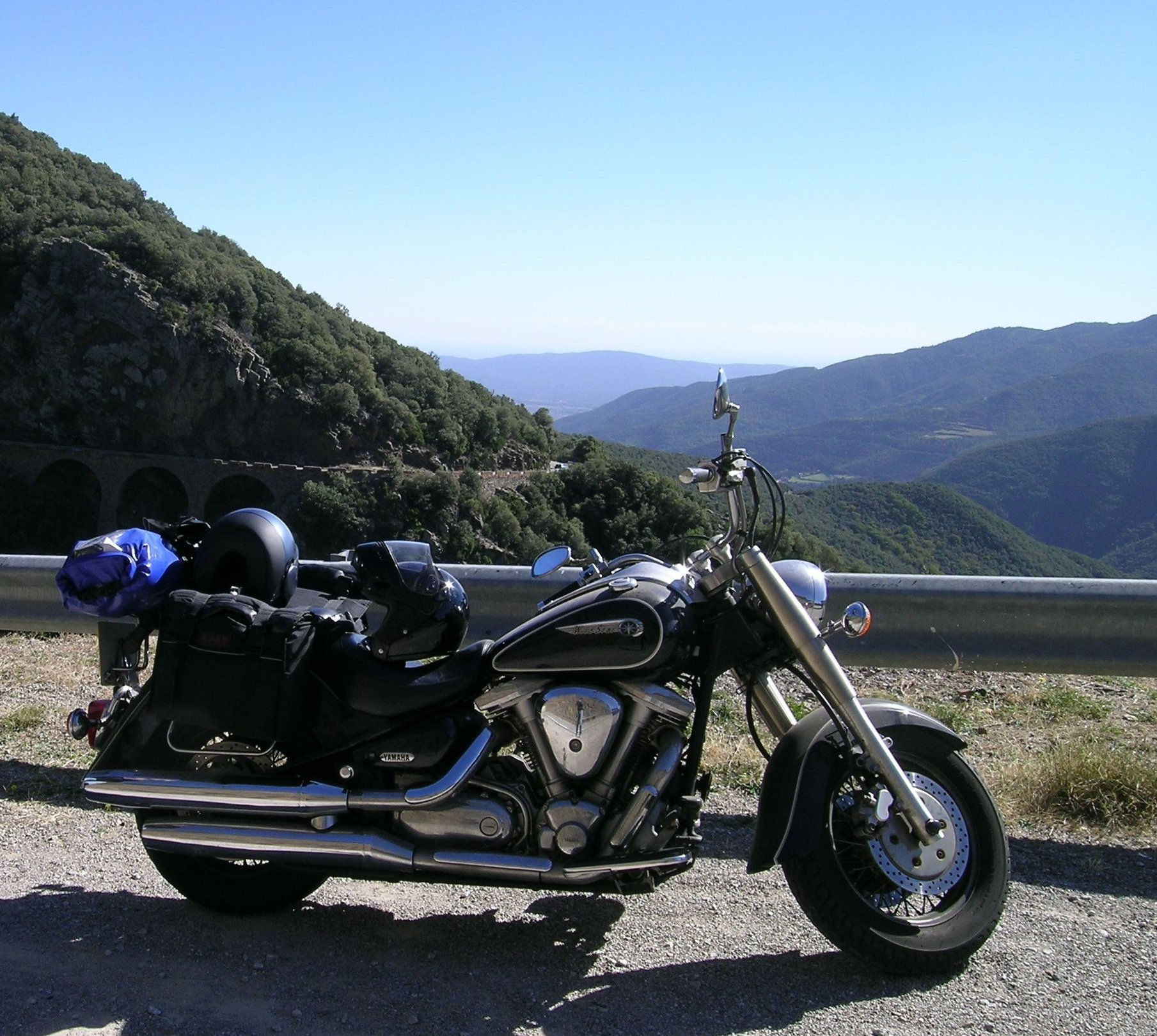
- Manufacturer: Yamaha Motor Company
- Also called: Road Star (XV16A); Variations: Midnight, Silverado (XV16AT) (US) Road Star (EUR) Wild Star
- Production: since 1999
- Class: Cruiser
- Engine: 1,602 cc (97.8 cu in) 4-stroke air-cooled V-twin
- Bore / stroke: 95 mm × 113 mm (3.7 in × 4.4 in)
- Compression ratio: 8.3:1
- Power: 62.6 hp (46.7 kW) @ 4,000 rpm
- Torque: 134 N⋅m (99 lbf⋅ft) @ 2250 rpm
- Transmission: 5-speed gearbox to belt drive
- Frame type: Steel double cradle
- Suspension: Telescopic forks front, rear swingarm (Link-type monocross suspension)
- Brakes: 298 mm (11.7 in) double disc front, 320 mm (13 in) single rear
- Wheelbase: 1,685 mm (66.3 in)
- Dimensions: L: 2,500 mm (98 in); W: 1,100 mm (43 in); H: 1,140 mm (45 in)
- Seat height: 710 mm (28 in)
- Weight: XV16A: 395 kg (871 lb); XV16AT: 390 kg (860 lb) (dry); XV16A: 410 kg (900 lb); XV16AT: 405 kg (893 lb) (wet)
- Fuel capacity: 20 L (4.4 imp gal; 5.3 US gal)
- Related: Yamaha DragStar 650 XVS550/XVS650A Yamaha DragStar 1100 XVS1100/XVS1100A

The Yamaha XV1600A is a cruiser-style motorcycle. It is also called the Yamaha Road Star or in Europe the Yamaha Wild Star. It was produced from 1999 through model year 2014 when the Roadstar model line was discontinued. The 1999–2003 models were the same 1602 cc naturally aspirated engines. In 2004 they changed the displacement to 1,670 cc. There were also a few design changes in 2004, including new tubeless aluminum wheels, a skinnier drive belt, and different engine casing color. The Road Star has a sleeker, sportier brother called the Yamaha Road Star Warrior that has a fuel-injected 1,700 cc engine and an all-aluminum chassis. The Road Star remained unchanged until 2008 when electronic fuel injection was introduced to the bike. There were variations of the Road Star with different trim and equipment packages. The Road Star was available with a Silverado trim package which included studded saddle bags, a back rest, studded driver and passenger seats, and a cruiser-style windscreen. The Silverado package changed names to the Midnight package with blacked out engine etc. For a few years, the Road Star was also available in an "S" package, which meant more chrome pieces for the buyer.

The Road Star is very popular among metric custom bike builders for its ease of customization and large-displacement engine.

The following models of the bike were manufactured:

- XV1600A Road Star (1999–2005)
- XV1600ALE Road Star Limited edition (2003)
- XV1600AS Road Star Midnight Star (2001–2005)
- XV1600AS Road Star MM Limited edition (2000)
- XV1600AT Road Star Silverado (1999–2005)
- XV1600ATLE Road Star Silverado Limited edition (2003)

The Road Star platform spawned other motorcycles for Yamaha including:

- Yamaha MT-01
- Yamaha Roadliner and Stratoliner
- Yamaha Raider

== Technical information ==
=== Engine ===
Engine no: P601E(US), P609E(JP)
Engine type: 4-stroke, air-cooled, V-2, OHV, 4-valves, 48° pushrod V-twin
Displacement: 1,602 cc
Bore x stroke: 95 mm x 113 mm
Compression ratio: 8.3:1
Maximum power: 46.3 kW (62.6 hp) @ 4,000 rpm
Maximum torque: 134 N·m (13.7 kgf·m, 99 ft·lbf) @ 2,250 rpm

=== Chassis ===
Front suspension system: Telescopic forks
Rear suspension system: Swinging (Link suspension)
Front brake: Dual discs, diameter 298 mm
Rear brake: Single disc, diameter 320 mm
Front tyre: 130/90-16 67H
Rear tyre: 150-80-16 71H
Front travel: 140 mm
Rear travel: 110 mm

=== Dimensions ===
Length: 2,500 mm
Width : 980 mm
Height: 1,140 mm
Seat height: 710 mm
Wheelbase: 1,685 mm
Minimum ground clearance: 165 mm
Dry weight: 332 kg
