= Yamaha Bolt =

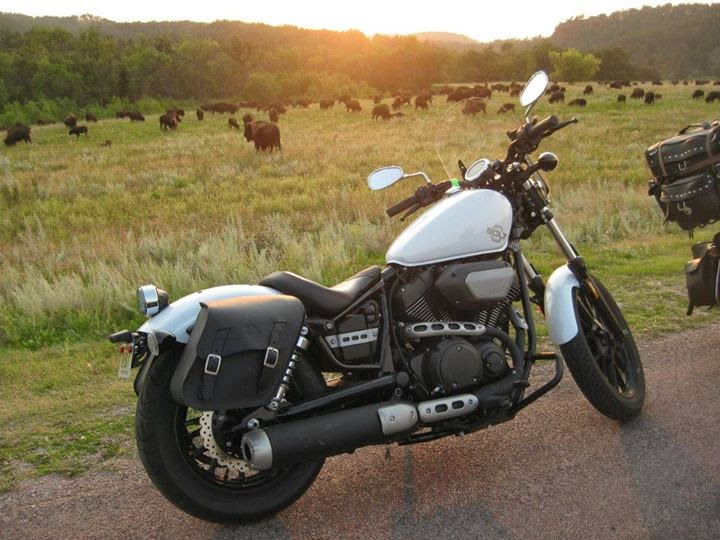
- 2014-Present
- Manufacturer: Yamaha Motor Company
- Also called: Yamaha XV950/Yamaha Star Bolt
- Parent company: Yamaha
- Production: 2013–Present
- Class: Cruiser
- Engine: 942cc 4-stroke air-cooled 60° V-twin
- Bore / stroke: 85.0×83.0mm
- Compression ratio: 9.0:1
- Transmission: 5-speed gearbox to belt drive
- Frame type: Steel double cradle
- Suspension: Telescopic fork, 120mm travel front, rear Dual shocks, 70mm travel
- Brakes: 298mm wave-type disc, 298mm front and rear
- Wheelbase: 1570mm
- Dimensions: L: 2291mm W: 944.88mm H: 1120.14mm
- Seat height: 690.88mm
- Weight: 244.94kg (540 lbs) (wet)
- Fuel capacity: 12.1ℓ (3.196 US gal)

The Yamaha Bolt or Star Bolt is the US name for a cruiser and café racer motorcycle introduced in 2013 as a 2014 model. It has a 942cc air cooled 4-stroke, 4-valve SOHC V-twin engine. An optional R-Spec model has reservoir shocks. The 2015 Yamaha Bolt, C-Spec and R-Spec were released in July 2014. In 2017 the XV950SCR (Scrambler) was released and the C Spec model was dropped from the lineup.

The Bolt is very well supported by the aftermarket and has proven to be a very customizable platform, lending itself well to the bobber, chopper, rat, and scrambler styles among others. In addition to the large aftermarket companies several smaller companies are also marketing a wide range of parts for these bikes.

In most non-US countries, this model is simply referred to as the "Yamaha XV950" and is available as a standard, or the higher spec "R" and "C" models which features ABS brakes and uprated rear shock absorbers.

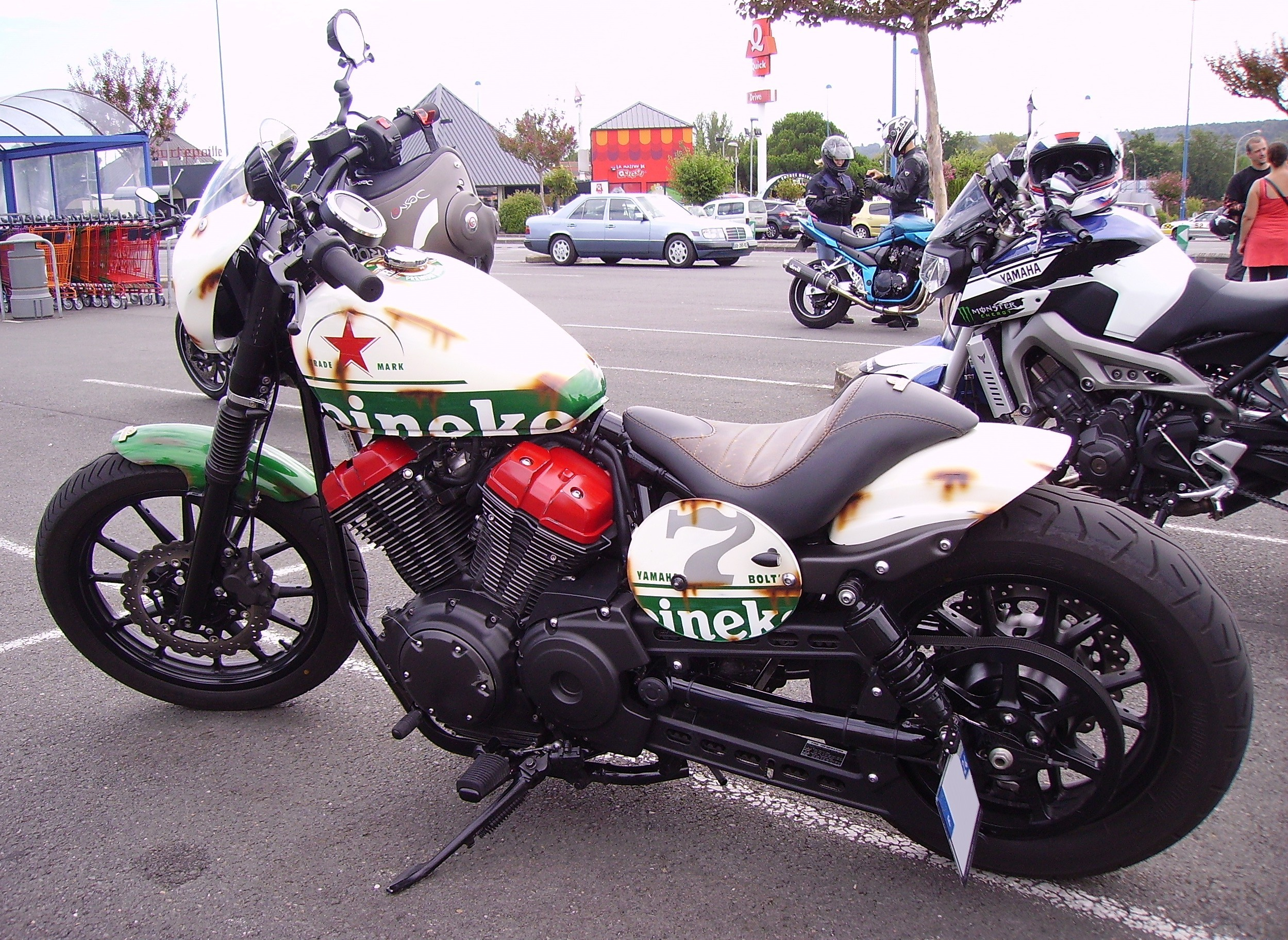
A modified Yamaha Bolt left

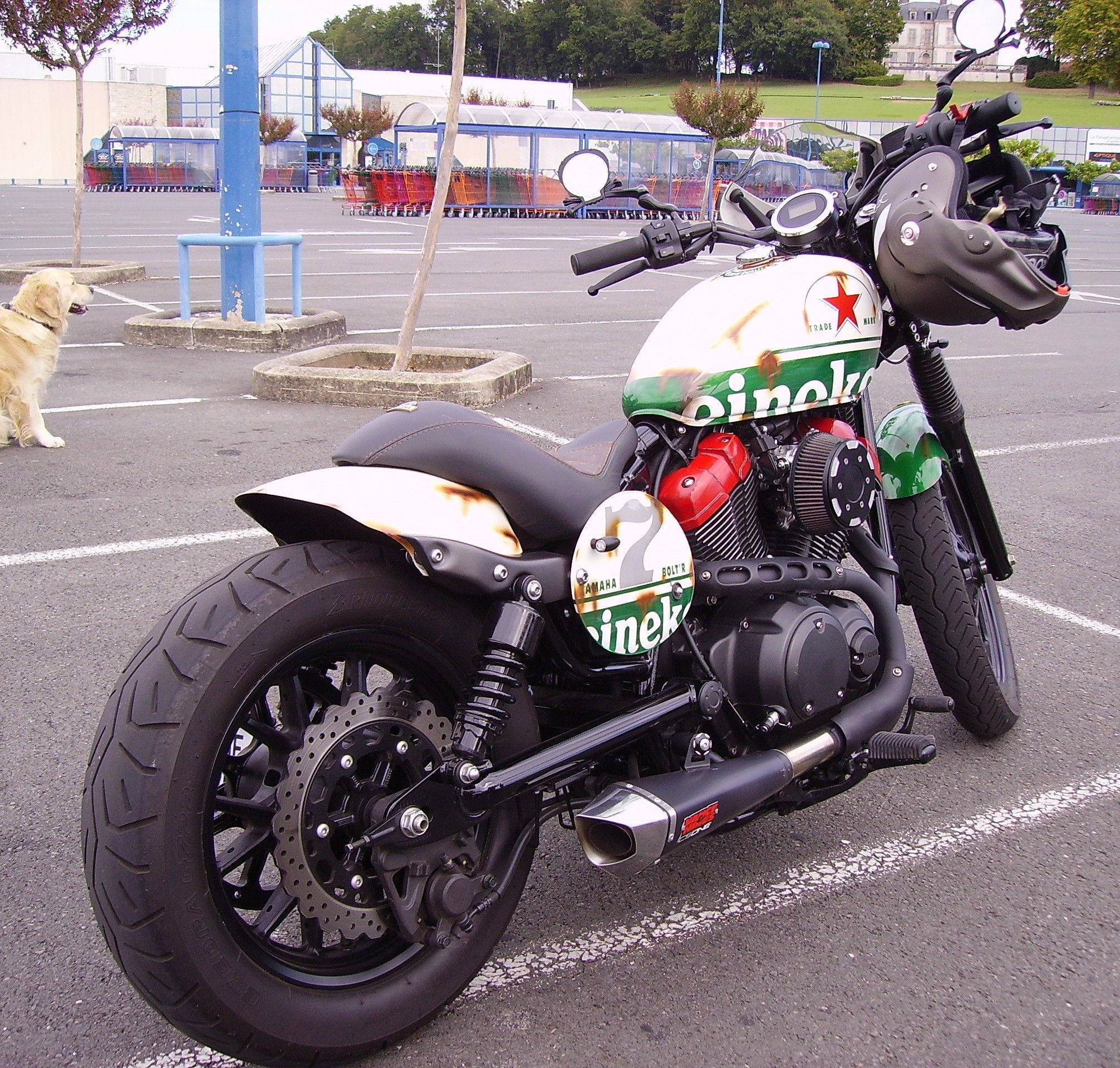
A modified Yamaha Bolt right
