= Yamaha XV1900A =

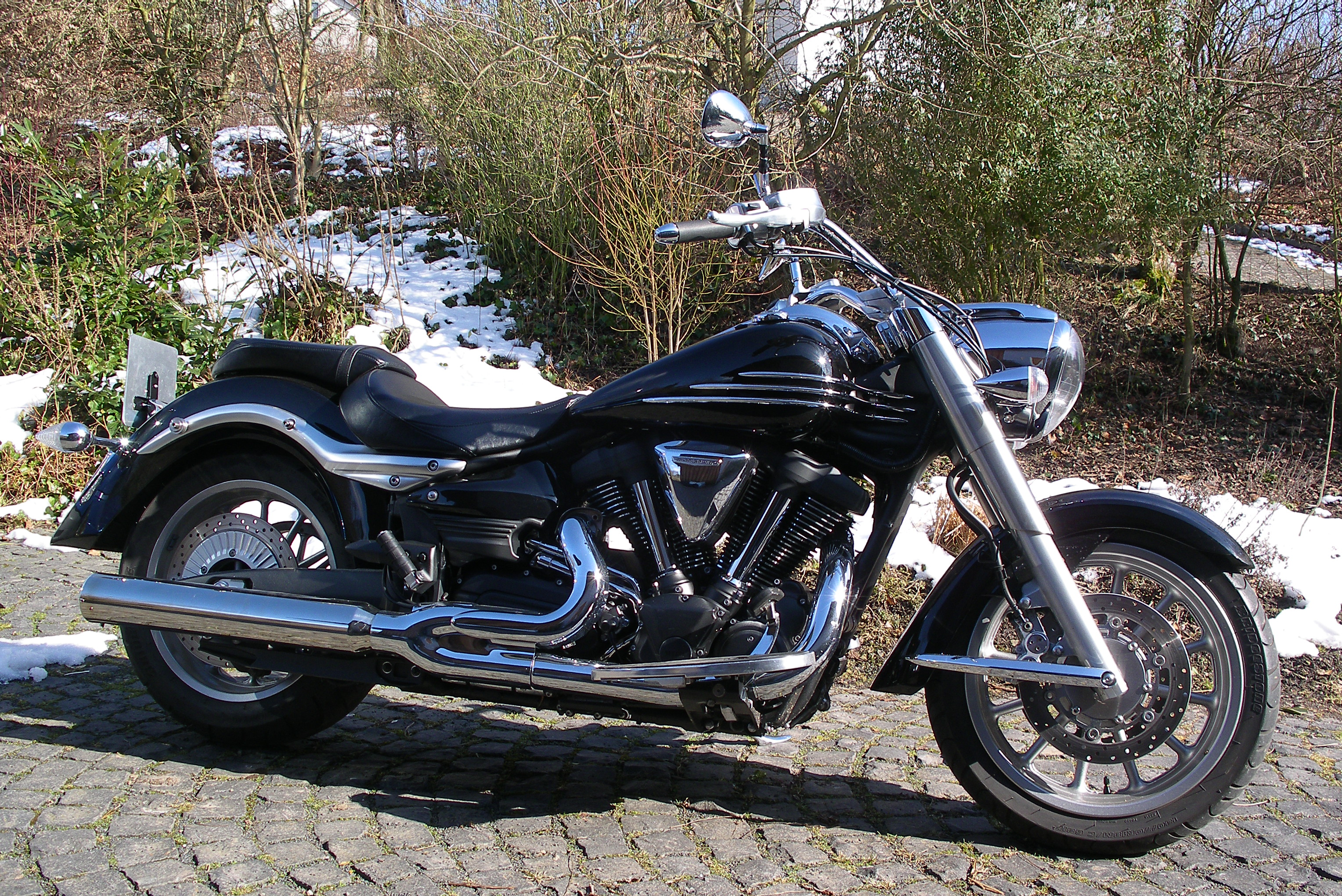
- Manufacturer: Yamaha Motor Company
- Also called: Star Roadliner (US); Star Stratoliner (US touring version); Yamaha Midnight Star (UK)
- Production: from 2006 to 2017
- Class: Cruiser
- Engine: 1,854 cc (113.1 cu in)48 degree 4-stroke air-cooled V-twin
- Bore / stroke: 100mm x 118mm (3.937 in x 4.646 in)
- Compression ratio: 9.5:1
- Power: 101 hp (75 kW) @ 4,400 rpm (rear wheel)
- Torque: 123 lb⋅ft (167 N⋅m) @ 2250 rpm (rear wheel)
- Transmission: 5-speed gearbox to belt drive
- Frame type: Aluminium double cradle
- Suspension: Telescopic forks front, rear swingarm (Link-type monocross suspension)
- Brakes: 298 mm (11.7 in) double disc front, single rear
- Wheelbase: 1,715 mm (67.5 in)
- Dimensions: L: 2,580 mm (102 in); W: 1,100 mm (43 in); H: 1,125 mm (44.3 in)
- Seat height: 705 mm (27.8 in)
- Weight: 329 kg (725 lb) (dry)
- Fuel capacity: 17 litres (3.7 imp gal; 4.5 US gal)

The Yamaha XV1900A is a motorcycle manufactured by the Yamaha Motor Company and sold in the United States through Yamaha's Star Motorcycles division. It was the largest Yamaha motorcycle while in production.

== Development ==
The Yamaha XV1900A cruiser was developed to exploit the large displacement end of the market for large cruisers. Yamaha had a well established range of big "Star" cruisers which went up to the Wild Star 1600 cc but there was a need to redesign the engine to meet anticipated exhaust emissions regulations and the opportunity to update the styling, which had remained largely unchanged for a decade.

== Engine ==
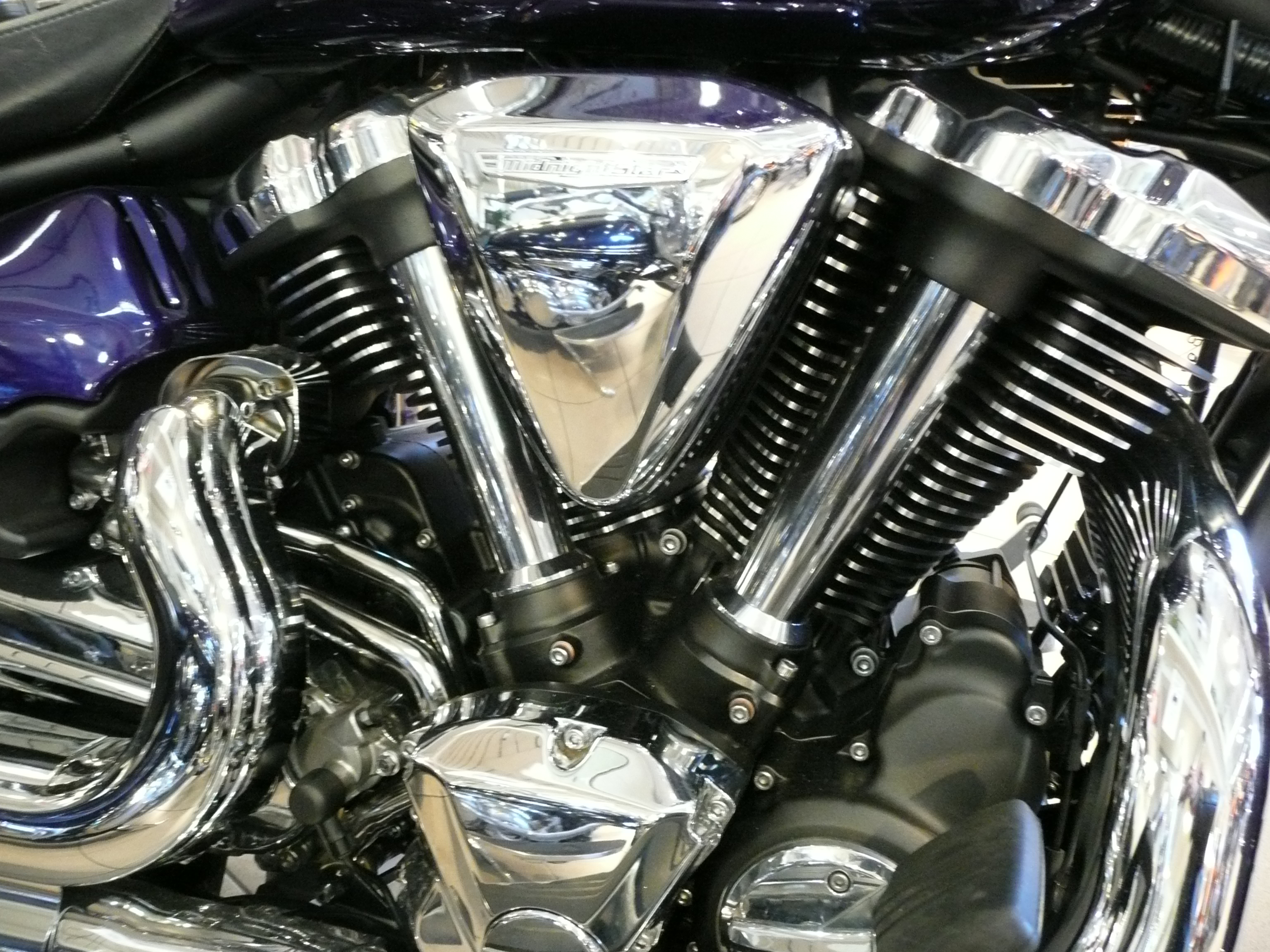
2010 engine design

The 1,854 cc (113.1 cu in) four-stroke, air-cooled, 48 degree V-twin engine was purpose-built to deliver maximum torque at 2,500 rpm in the 55 to 75 mph (90 to 120 km/h) range used for motorcycle cruising. Each cylinder has four pushrod-activated valves and twin spark plugs. To reduce friction, the forged pistons have an Alumite coating and travel in ceramic-composite-coated cylinder bores.

With an undersquare bore and stroke of 100mm (3.937 in) x 118mm (4.646 in), the engine has a compression ratio of 9.5:1 and is the first Yamaha cruiser motorcycle to be equipped with the compact Exhaust Ultimate Power Valve (EXUP) four-stroke power valve system previously only found on their line of high performance sports motorcycles.

An unusual feature of the new engine is a special 'pent-roof combustion chamber', designed to increase the efficiency of gas flow. The engine also has counter-rotating balancers on both ends of the crankshaft to reduce the vibration typical of large V-Twins.

== Transmission ==
The engine's output is transmitted via a wide-ratio five-speed gearbox and compact new transfer case, with power delivery controlled by a hydraulic clutch, the XV1900A Midnight Star is equipped with a belt drive system.

== Frame ==
A lightweight long wheelbase (1,715 mm or 67.5 in) frame was designed using aluminum die casting to minimize weight, with a double cradle design to provide the strength. Suspension consists of a die cast aluminum swinging arm and a hidden single horizontal rear shock absorber and large diameter front forks.

== Raider version ==
Starting in 2008, a custom version was produced in limited numbers featuring a lowered seat, lengthened front forks, a wider 210 mm rear tyre, the widest on any Yamaha motorcycle, and special black finish to the engine and a range of custom fittings. The Raider was discontinued for 2018.

== See also ==
- Yamaha DragStar
