= Yamaha DragStar 1100 =

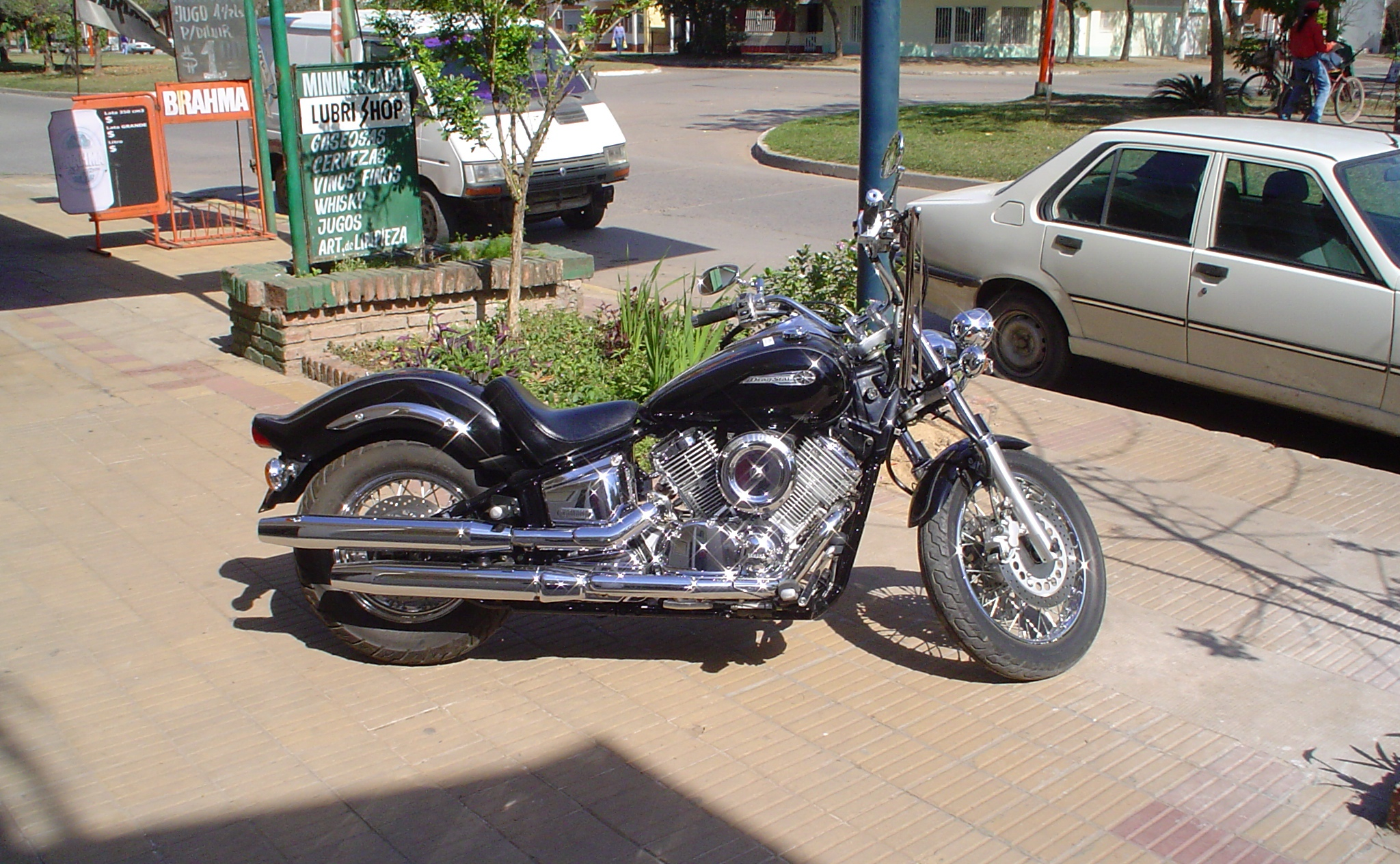
- Manufacturer: Yamaha Motor Company
- Also called: Yamaha V Star 1100 - XVS1100/XVS1100A
- Production: 1998–2008
- Class: Cruiser
- Engine: 1,063 cc (64.9 cu in) 4-stroke SOHC V-twin
- Power: 52hp @ 5750rpm
- Torque: 62.7 lb-ft @ 2500rpm
- Wheelbase: 1,640 mm (65 in)
- Dimensions: L: 2,405 mm (94.7 in); W: 895 mm (35.2 in); H: 1,095 mm (43.1 in)
- Seat height: 690 mm (27 in)
- Weight: 650 lb (290 kg) (dry)
- Fuel capacity: 17.5 L (3.8 imp gal; 4.6 US gal)
- Related: Yamaha DragStar 650 XVS550/XVS650A Yamaha Road Star/Wild Star XV1600A

The Yamaha XVS 1100 DragStar, sold as the V-Star 1100 in North America, is a motorcycle manufactured by Yamaha Motor Corporation. It comes in two versions, the XVS1100 Custom and the XVS1100A Classic, the former a more modern style, and the latter a more classic style, with rounder edges and is 13 kg (29 lb) heavier. The seat height is slightly lower on the Custom.

The 1100, along with its 650 sibling, enjoy a huge following around the world. Aftermarket companies produce a number of items to customize the model. Over the lifespan of the model, changes have been evolutionary, with only minor updates.

== Beginnings ==
The DragStar began as the XVS650 in 1997 in Europe (400 version available in Japan since 1996), and grew in 1999 to include the XVS1100 Custom. The 1100 used a reworked version of the venerable Virago 75-degree, air-cooled v-twin engine which had been in use since the early 1980s.

The Star version offered better torque for the new midsize cruiser bike. The Star carried over the shaft-drive layout from the Virago, but relied on a new suspension and frame, discarding the outboard dual shocks and stressed-member engine arrangement of the Virago in favor of a single-shock and twin downtubes. Dual Mikuni 37 mm carburetors with throttle-position sensors are used to efficiently meter fuel to the 8.3:1, oversquare engine.

The last of the bikes were manufactured in 2008.

== Classic model added ==
The DragStar/V-Star gathered followers early on, which led to the addition in 2000 of the Classic model. As opposed to the Custom's bobbed rear fender, 5 and 3/4 headlight, aluminum rims with spokes, exposed forks, 110 front tire and other custom touches, the Classic had longer fenders, floorboards, cast magnesium wheels, thicker brake and shift levers, a 7-inch headlight, substantial fork covers and a 130 front tire. Later a Silverado model, which included such amenities as a windscreen, sissy bar and soft sidebags was introduced as an upscale model.

== Features ==
The V-Star 1100 Classic came with the large fenders which also included the floorboards for the rider as a standard item with the rocker shifter pegs. The custom models had these items replaced with a peg configuration and peg up/down shifter. The customs also replaced the standard large front tire with a minute thinner tire in the category of a 90 series or a 110 series to resemble the Harley-Davidson 1200 Sportster.

The 1100 models were sought after machines based on the dimensional parameters of an 1,063 cc (64.9 cu in) engine and roughly 700 lb (320 kg) platform, with 130 series front and 170 series rear tires.

== See also ==
- Yamaha DragStar
- Yamaha DragStar 250 XVS250
- Yamaha DragStar 650 XVS650/XVS650A
