= Yamaha DragStar 650 =

Yamaha motorcycle

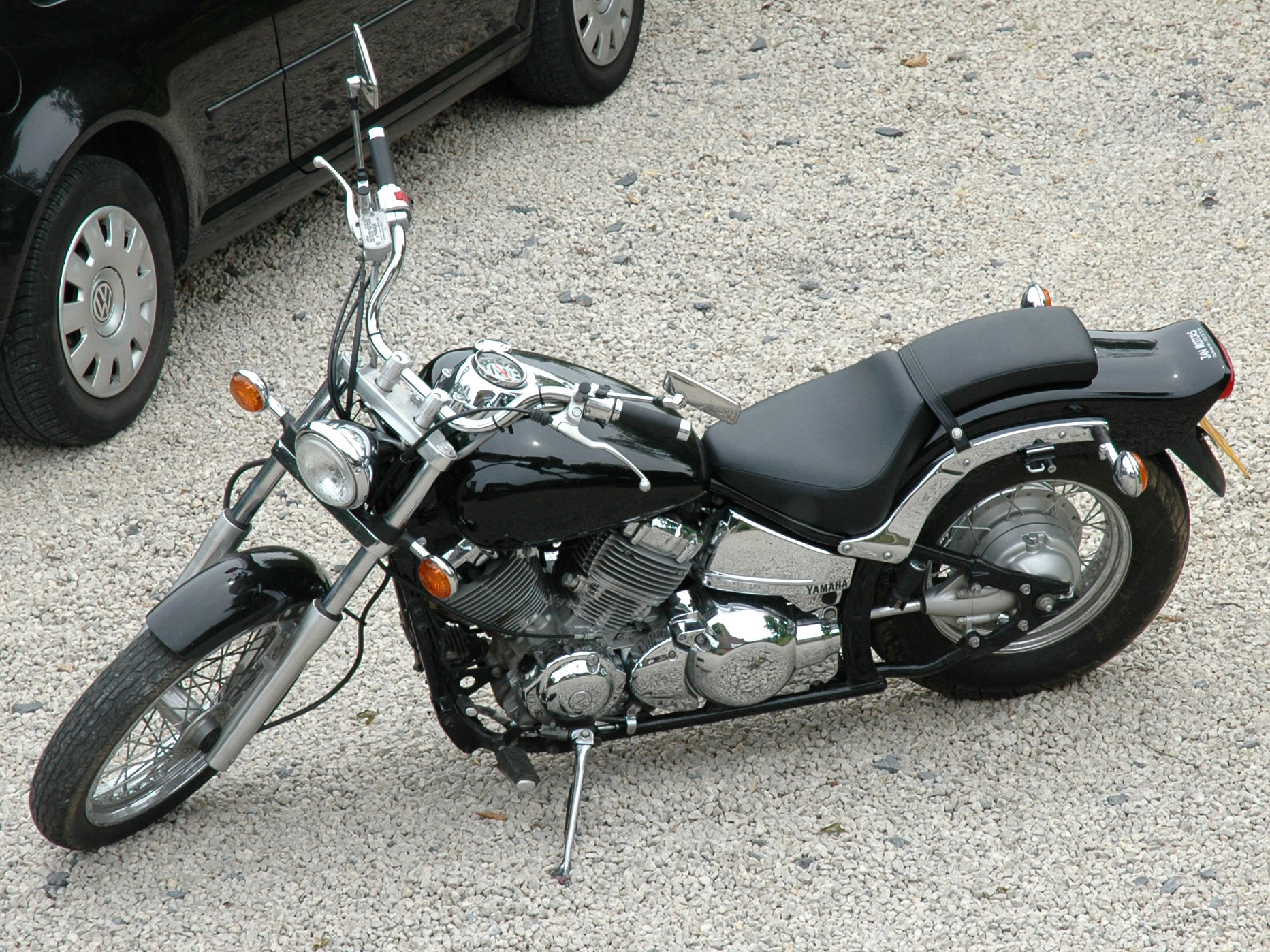
- Manufacturer: Yamaha Motor Company
- Also called: Yamaha V Star 650 - XVS650/XVS650A
- Production: 1997-2017
- Predecessor: Yamaha Virago 535
- Class: Cruiser
- Engine: 649 cc (39.6 cu in) air-cooled 70° V-twin; SOHC, 2 v/cyl
- Transmission: 5-speed; multiplate wet clutch
- Frame type: Steel pipe/double cradle
- Suspension: Front: Telescopic fork; 139 mm (5.5 in) travel Rear: Single shock, link-type; w/adjustable preload;
- Brakes: Front: 298 mm disc Rear: 200 mm drum
- Wheelbase: 1,610 mm (63 in) XVS650 / 1,625 mm (64.0 in) XVS650A
- Dimensions: L: 2,339 mm (92.1 in) XVS650 / 2,451 mm (96.5 in) XVS650A; W: 878 mm (34.6 in) XVS650 / 929 mm (36.6 in) XVS650A; H: 1,069 mm (42.1 in) XVS650 / 1,104 mm (43.5 in) XVS650A
- Seat height: 695 mm (27.4 in) XVS650 / 711 mm (28.0 in) XVS650A
- Fuel capacity: 16 L (3.5 imp gal; 4.2 US gal) / 3 L (0.66 imp gal; 0.79 US gal) Reserve
- Related: Yamaha DragStar 1100 XVS1100/XVS1100A

The Yamaha DragStar 650 (also known as the V Star 650 and the XVS650/XVS650A) is a cruiser-style motorcycle produced by Yamaha Motor Company between 1997 and 2017.

The XVS650 came in two models: the Custom with a lower seat height and slightly less weight, and the Classic with a higher seat.

== Description ==
=== Engine ===
The XVS650 engine is based on the Yamaha Virago 535 engine, with the cylinders bored an additional 5 mm to 81 mm and stroked 4 mm more to 63 mm, increasing displacement to 649 cc.

=== Versions ===
The Yamaha XVS650 was sold in the U.S. as the entry-level bike of the V-Star line. That line was offered from 1998 to 2008 in two different versions: the Custom and the Classic. Both versions are built around the same 649 cc v-twin engine. The V-Star line offers the visual appeal of larger v-twin motorcycles paired with the fuel efficiency, reliability, and handling of a mid-size cruiser.

- V-Star Custom (650) XVS650 - Base version for long-distance cruising. It was equipped with plastic front & rear fenders, and incorporated a recessed taillight under the flared rear fender. This model also came in a special Midnight Custom version with blacked-out trim. The Midnight Custom (XVS65Y-B) was painted in Raven (black metallic), including black wheel rims and black satin trim throughout. Chrome accents and pipes complimented the monochromatic color scheme.

The Custom seat height is 695 mm (27.4 in), and weight approximately 232 kg (511 lb).

- V-Star Classic (650) XVS650A - The same frame as the V-star Custom but with wider front wheel, metal fenders, longer bodywork, less chromed styling, dragged handlebars, wider seat and numerous styling differences.

The Classic has a seat height of 708 mm (27.9 in), and is approximately 15 kg heavier, at 247 kg (545 lb).

- V-Star Silverado (650) - Much as the V-Star Classic with saddlebags and a few other touring additions

== See also ==
- Star Motorcycles full range
- Yamaha DragStar 1100 - XVS1100/XVS1100A
