= Cruiser (motorcycle) =

Type of motorcycle

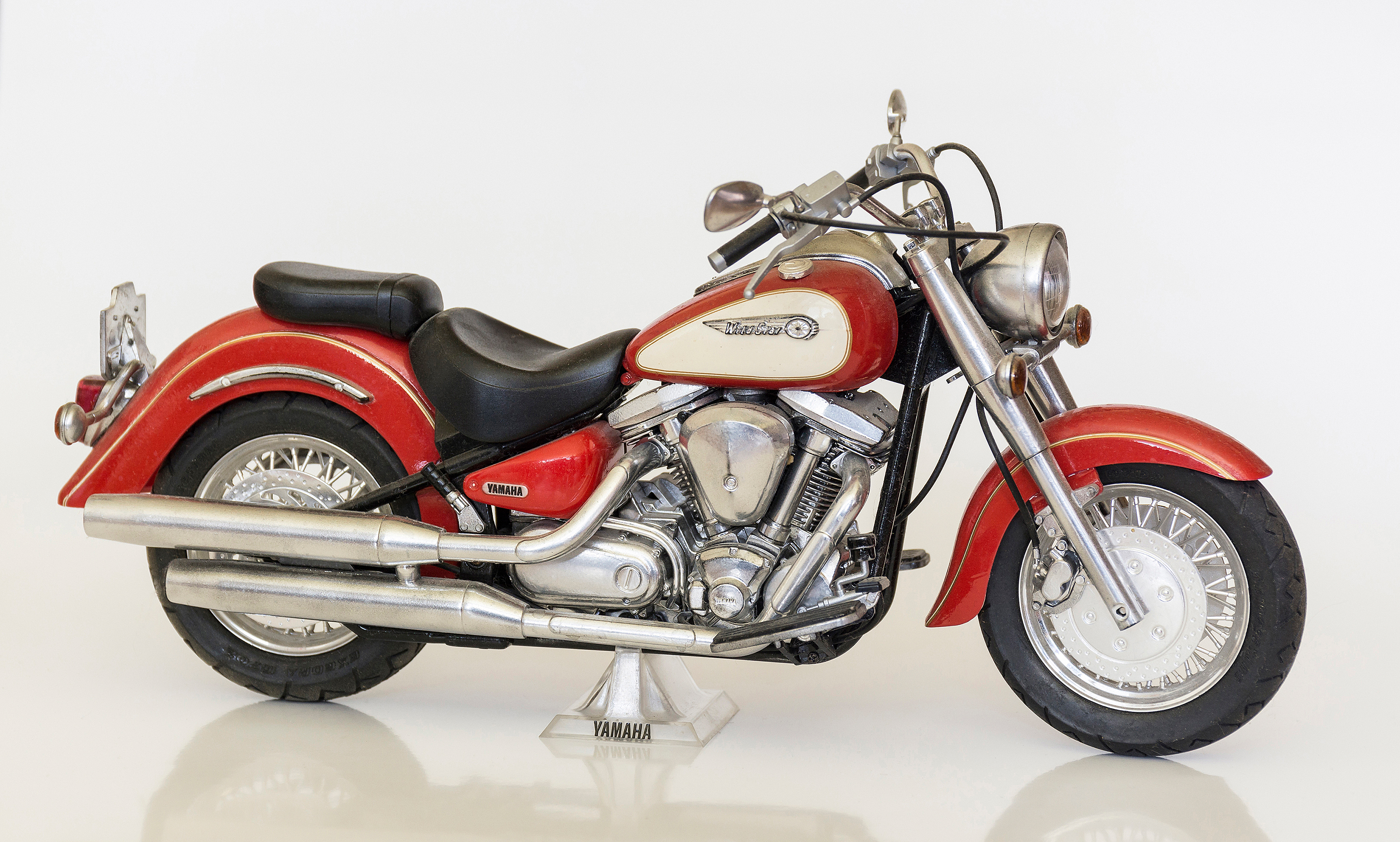
Yamaha XV1600 Wild Star

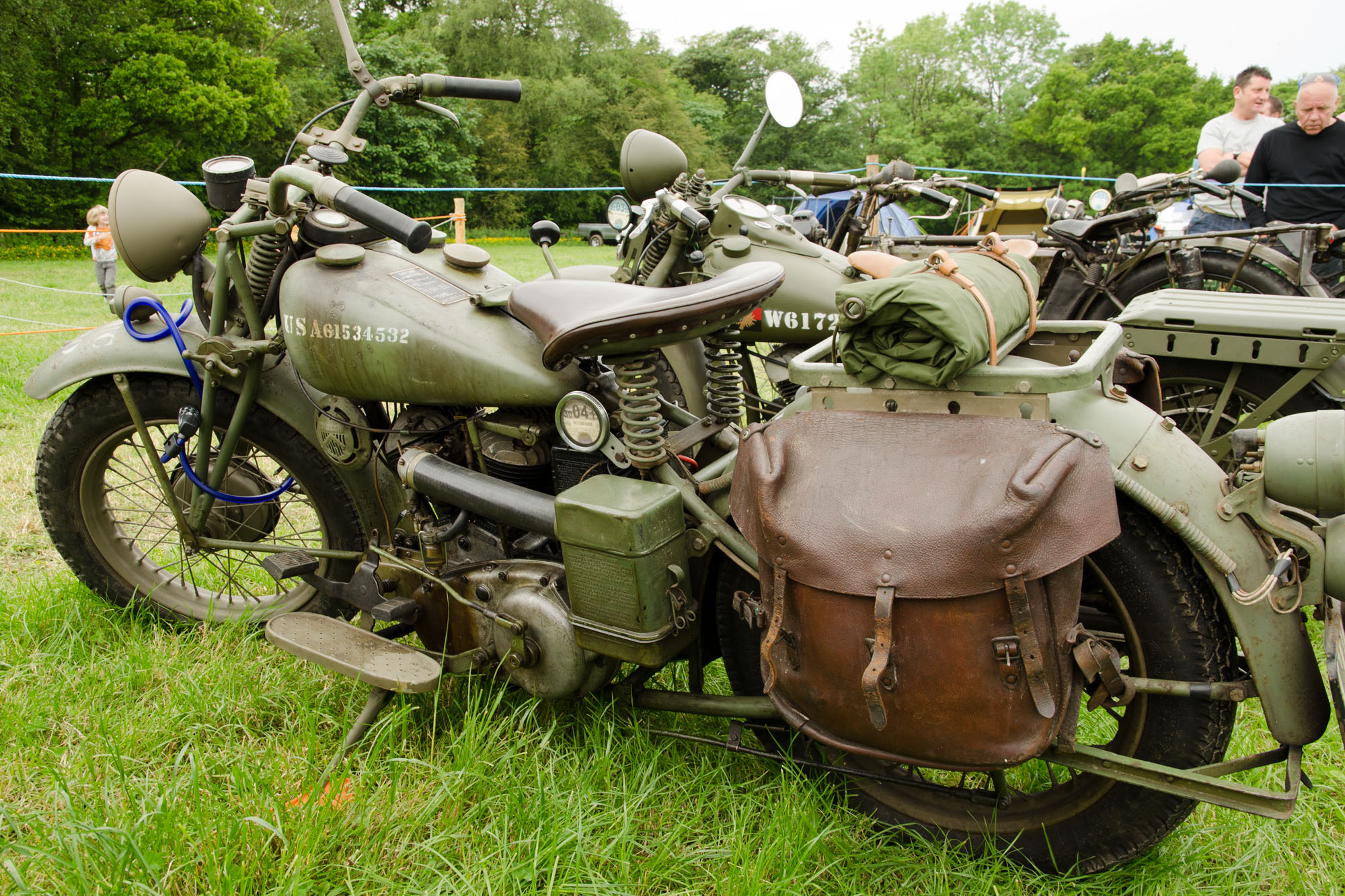
Indian Scout 741B

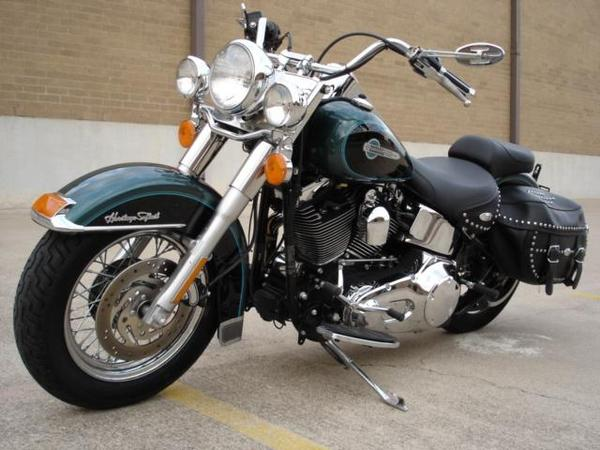
Harley-Davidson Softail Heritage Classic

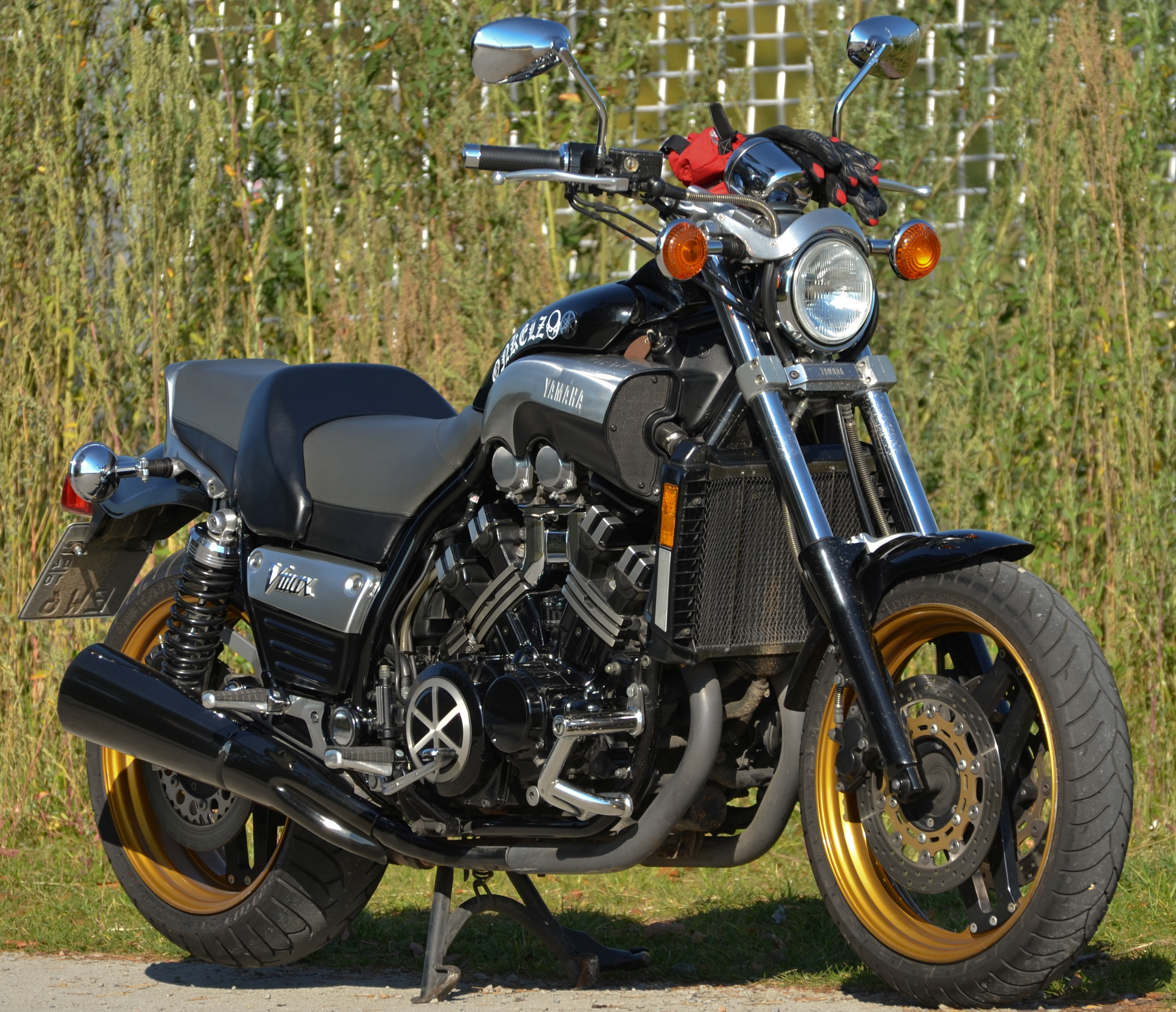
Yamaha V-Max power cruiser

A cruiser motorcycle is a motorcycle in the style of those made by American manufacturers such as Harley-Davidson, Indian, Excelsior and Henderson from the 1930s to the early 1960s.

== Characteristics ==
The riding position usually places the feet forward and the hands up, with the spine upright or leaning back slightly. Typical cruiser engines emphasize easy rideability and shifting, with plenty of low-end torque, but not necessarily large amounts of horsepower, and are traditionally V-twins. However, inline engines have become more common. Cruisers with greater performance than usual, including bigger engines with more horsepower, stronger brakes, and better suspension, are often called power cruisers.

== Market share ==
Japanese companies began producing models evocative of the early cruisers in the mid-1980s, and by 1997 the market had grown to nearly 60 percent of the US market. A number of motorcycle manufacturers including BMW, Honda, Moto Guzzi, Yamaha, Suzuki, Triumph and Victory have currently or have had important models evocative of the American cruiser.

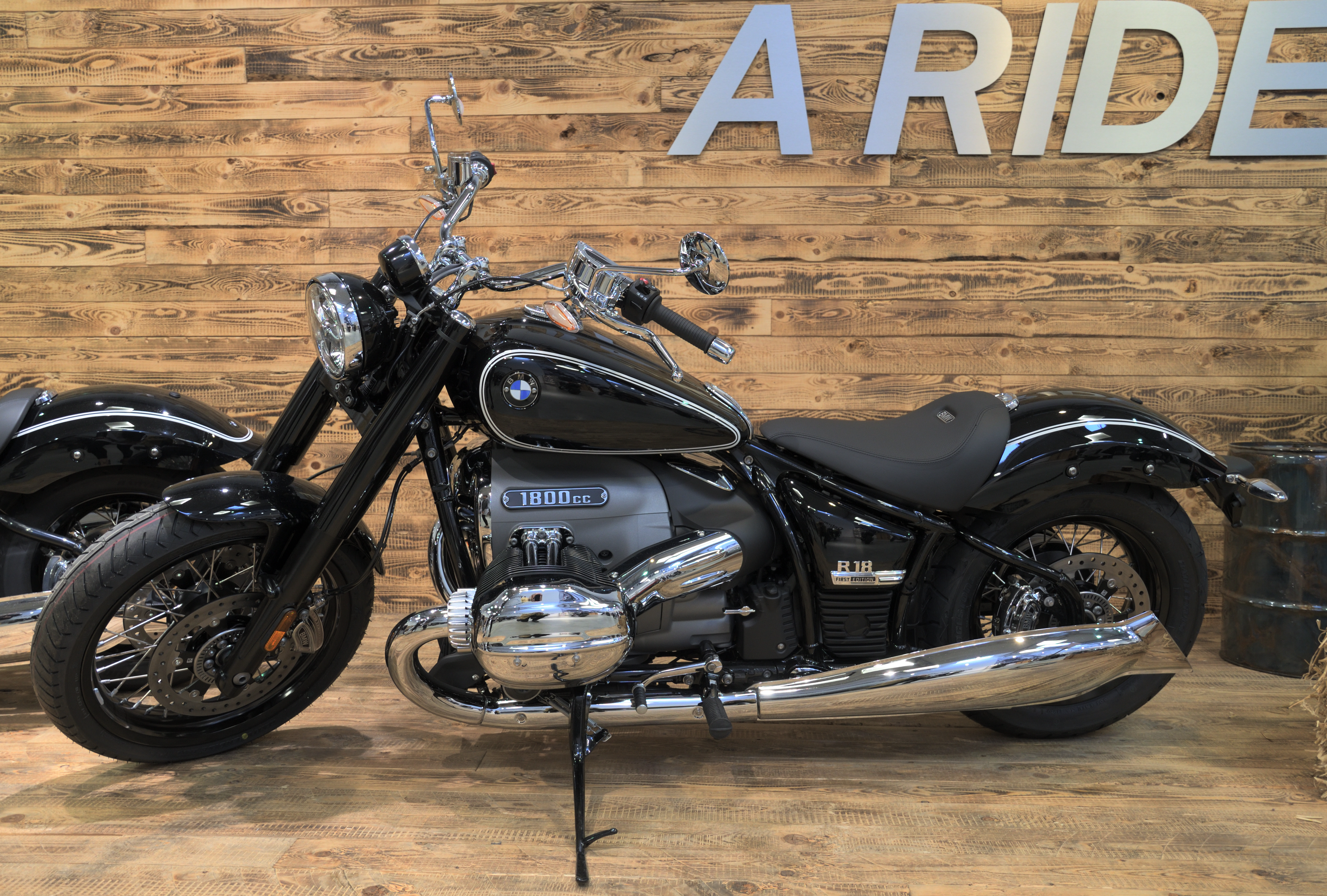
BMW R18

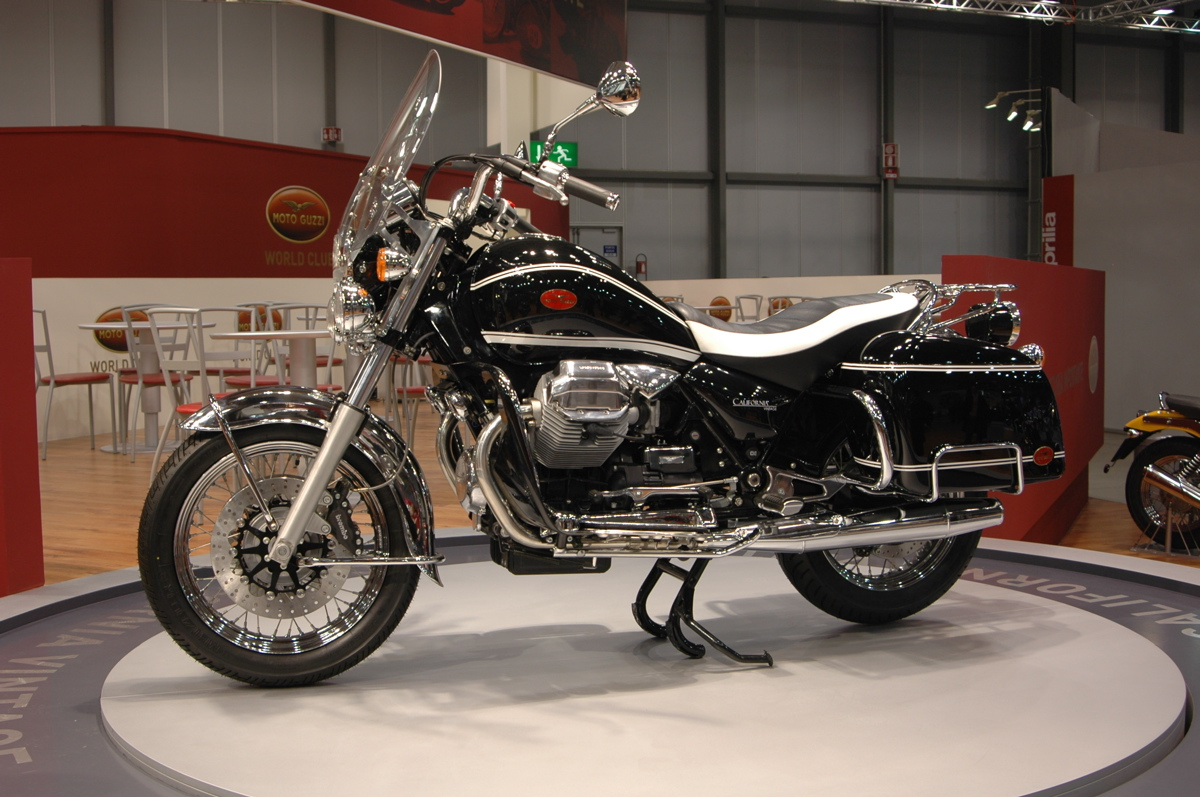
Moto Guzzi California Vintage (2005)

== Terminology ==
Harley-Davidsons and other cruisers with extensive luggage for touring have been called, sometimes disparagingly or jocularly, baggers, or full baggers, as well as dressers, full dressers, or full dress tourers. These terms are no longer limited to cruisers, but may be any touring motorcycle.

== Customization ==
Cruisers are often the basis for custom motorcycle projects that result in a bike modified to suit the owner's ideals, and as such are a source of pride and accomplishment.

== Power cruisers ==
Power cruiser bikes are named for their higher levels of power. They often feature upgraded brakes and suspensions, better ground clearance, and premium surface finishes, and may have more exotic or modern muscular (non-traditional cruiser) styling.

Many power cruisers and Japanese cruisers of the 1980s have more neutral riding positions. While traditional cruisers have limited performance and turning ability due to a low-slung design, power cruisers or similar performance-oriented cruisers can be leaned further for better cornering. Otherwise, customization can increase the bike's lean angle to enable cornering at higher speeds.

== See also ==
- Outline of motorcycles and motorcycling
