= Yamaha YZF-R1 =

Sport motorcycle

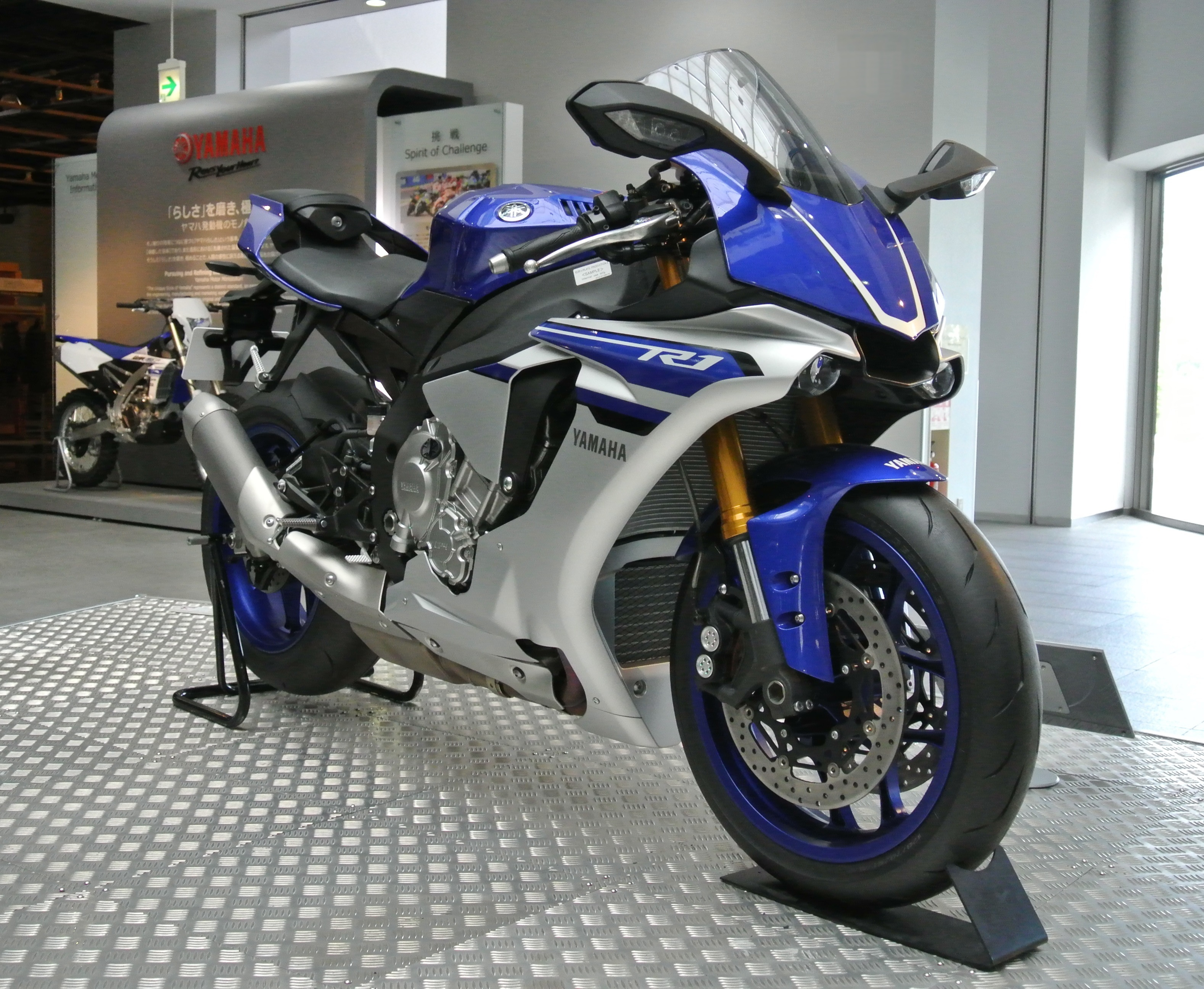
- A 2015 Yamaha YZF-R1 model
- Manufacturer: Yamaha Motor Company
- Also called: Yamaha R1
- Production: 1998–present
- Predecessor: Yamaha YZF1000R
- Class: Sport bike
- Engine: 998cc CP4 crossplane engine
- Top speed: 186 mph (299 km/h)
- Power: 199hp
- Transmission: 6-speed; wet multiplate assist and slipper clutch
- Frame type: Deltabox aluminum alloy
- Brakes: F: Dual 320mm hydraulic disc R: Dual 220mm hydraulic disc
- Rake, trail: 24.0°, 4.0 in (10 cm)
- Wheelbase: 55.3 in (140 cm)
- Dimensions: L: 80.9 in (205 cm); W: 27.2 in (69 cm)
- Seat height: 33.7 in (86 cm)
- Weight: 179 kg (395 lb) (dry); 203 kg (448 lb) (wet)
- Related: Yamaha FZR1000

The Yamaha YZF-R1, or simply R1, is a 998 cc (60.9 cu in) sports motorcycle of the YZF-R series made by Yamaha. It was first released in 1998, undergoing significant updates in 2000, 2002, 2004, 2006, 2007, 2009, 2015, 2018 and 2020.

== 1998–1999 (RN01) ==
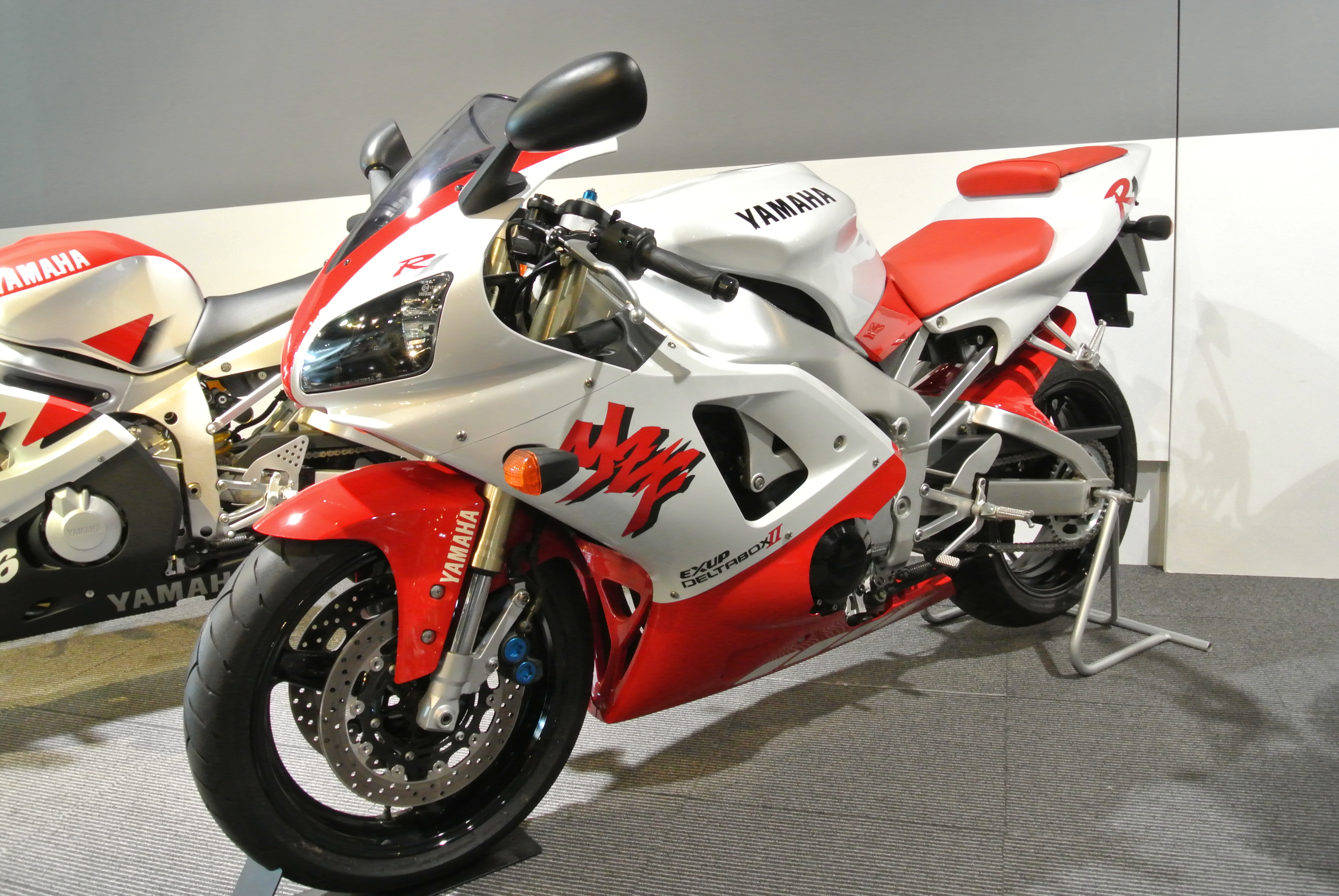
A red and white version of the first Yamaha YZF-R1 model in 1998

Yamaha launched the YZF-R1 in 1998 after redesigning the Genesis engine to create a more compact engine by raising the gearbox input shaft and allowing the gearbox output shaft to be placed beneath it. This "stacked gearbox" was followed by other manufacturers. Compacting the engine made it much shorter, allowing the wheelbase to be shortened as well and the center of gravity to be optimized. The swingarm could be made longer without compromising the overall wheelbase, which was a short 1,385 mm (54.5 in). Four 40 mm Keihin CV carburetors fed fuel to the engine.

The R1 was also equipped with a 41 mm KYB upside-down front fork and 300 mm semi-floating disc brakes. The instrument panel was electronic, with a self-diagnosis system and digital speed readout. The exhaust used Yamaha's Exhaust Ultimate Power Valve (EXUP) system, which controlled exhaust gas flow to maximize engine power production at all revs, resulting in a high-power and high-torque engine.

The Yamaha YZF-R6 was introduced in 1999 as the 600 cc version of the R1 super bike.

The 1999 R1 saw only minor changes, apart from paint and graphics. Improvements included a redesigned gear change linkage and an increase in gear change shaft length. Fuel tank reserve capacity was reduced from 5.5 to 4.0 L (1.21 to 0.88 imp gal; 1.5 to 1.1 US gal), while total fuel tank capacity was unchanged at 18 L (4.0 imp gal; 4.8 US gal).

Motorcycle Consumer News tests of the 1998 model year YZF-R1 yielded a 0 to 60 mph (0 to 97 km/h) time of 2.96 seconds and 0 to 100 mph (0 to 161 km/h) of 5.93 seconds, a 0 to 1/4 mi (0.00 to 0.40 km) time of 10.19 seconds at 131.40 mph (211.47 km/h), and a top speed of 168 mph (270 km/h), with deceleration from 60 to 0 mph (97 to 0 km/h) of 113.9 ft (34.7 m). For the 1999 model year, Cycle World tests recorded a 0 to 60 mph (0 to 97 km/h) time of 3.0 seconds, 0 to 1/4 mi (0.00 to 0.40 km) time of 10.31 seconds at 139.55 mph (224.58 km/h), and a top speed of 170 mph (270 km/h).

== 2000–2001 (RN04) ==
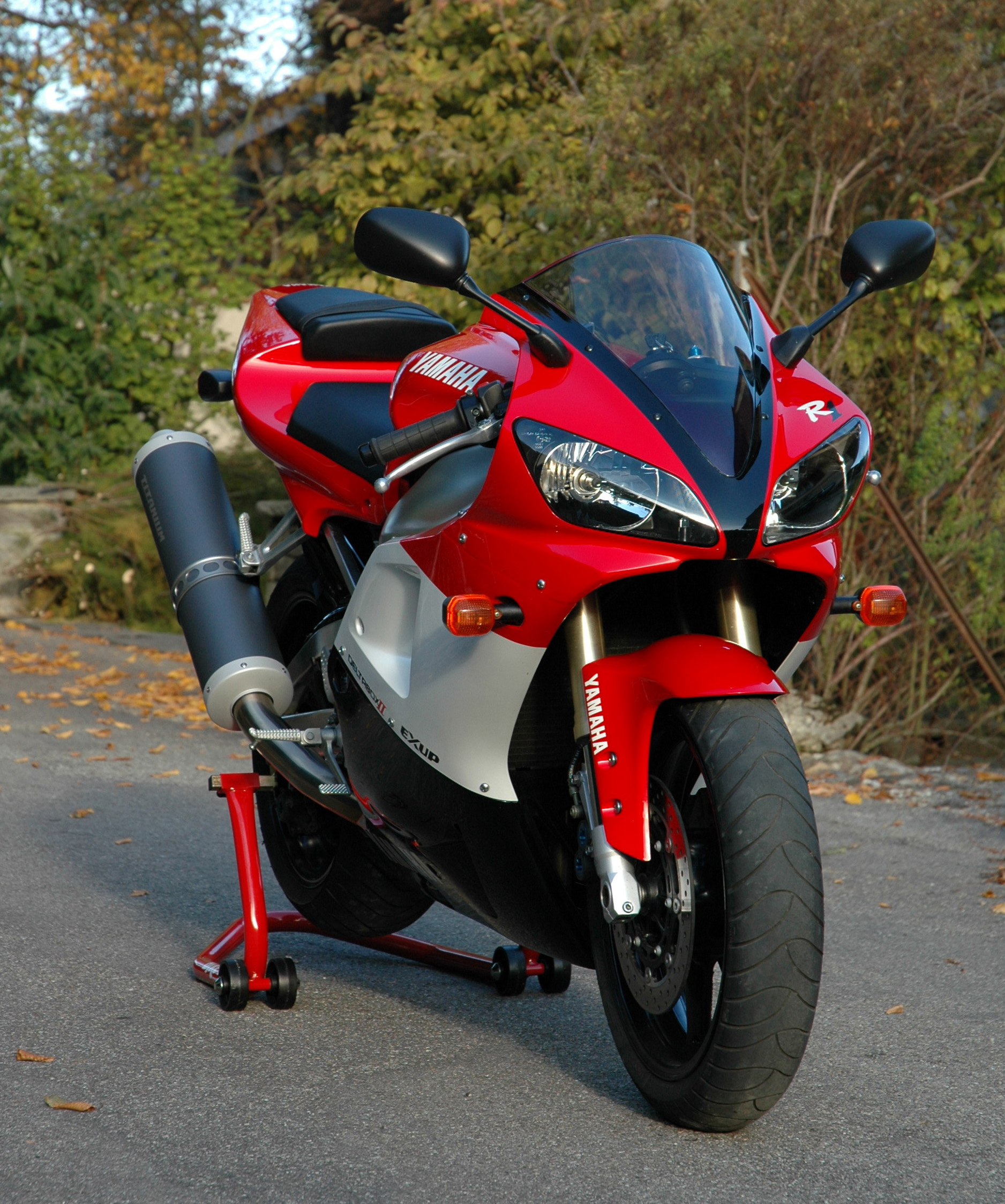
2001 YZF-R1

In 2000, Yamaha introduced a series of changes to improve the R1, and minor changes to the bodywork to allow for better long-duration ride handling. Yamaha's main design goal was to sharpen the pre-existing bike and not to redesign it. The dry weight was reduced five pounds to 414 lb (188 kg).

At 127.8 hp (95.3 kW) at the rear wheel, top-end output remained the same, but changes to the engine management system were intended to result in a smoother, broader distribution of power. The bodywork remained similar to that of the previous R1, although a 3% reduction in the drag coefficient was achieved. The headlight housing's profile was sharpened, the side panels were made more aerodynamic, and the windscreen was reshaped for better rider protection.

The seating area was also updated. The fuel tank was reshaped, with a more relaxed rear angle and deeper leg recesses to provide a better riding feel. The seat extended further towards the rear of the tank, and the new steeper seating position put additional weight on the front end. All of this was aimed at improving weight bias, thus offering sharper cornering and more stability.

Mechanically, the carburetors were re-jetted in an effort to improve throttle response, especially in the low end, way up to the bike's 11,750 rpm redline. The redesigned camshafts were lightened and used internal oil ways to lubricate journals that, when combined with reduced tappet clearance, provided less friction and created less engine noise. The gearbox received a taller first gear, a hollow chrome-moly gear change shaft with an additional bearing, and a completely redesigned shift linkage and foot pedal. These changes were aimed at eliminating problems with the transmission in earlier models, and to help seamlessly transfer the bike's power to the road.

== 2002–2003 (RN09) ==
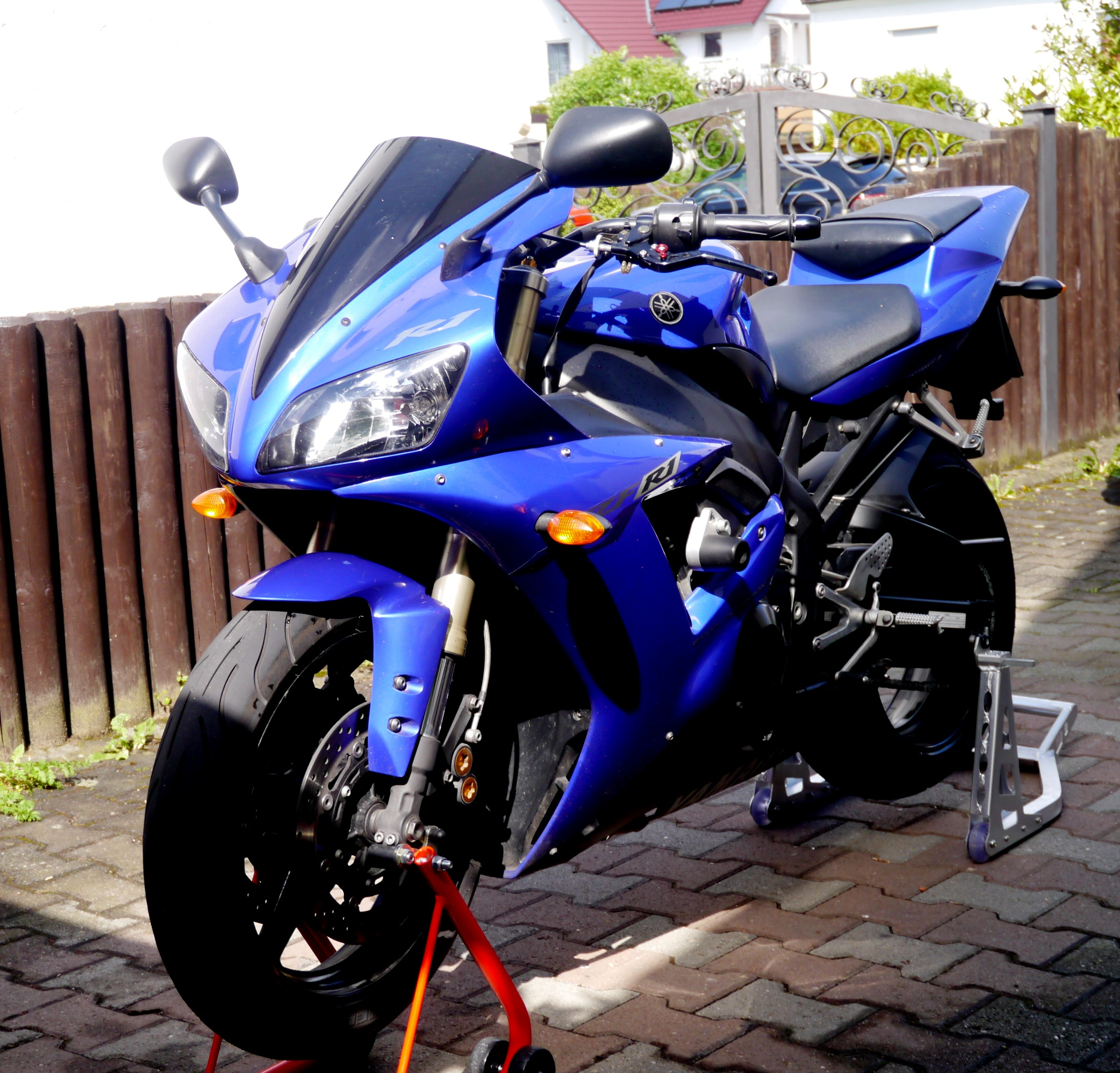
2002 YZF-R1

A new fuel injection system was introduced for the 2002 year, which worked like a carburetor by employing a CV carburetor slide controlled by a vacuum created by the engine. With a similar power output to the 2000-2001 bike, though, the engine remained largely the same. One notable improvement was the use of new cylinder sleeves of a high silicon content alloy containing magnesium that minimized thermal distortion, reducing oil consumption. The exhaust system was changed from a 4-into-1 to a new titanium 4-into-2-into-1 design.

Also in 2002, Yamaha released the newly developed Deltabox frame, whose hydro-formed construction reduced the total number of frame welds and improved the frame's rigidity by 30%. The cooling system was redesigned for better performance and compactness. The rear end of the motorcycle was updated and streamlined with an LED taillight, allowing for cleaner rear body lines when choosing one of several common aftermarket modifications. These modifications included removal of the turn signal stalks and stock license plate bracket, and replacing them with replacements that "hugged" the body or frame. The 2002 model also saw front lighting improvements in the form of sharper headlights and the addition of side "parking" lights within the twin-headlight panel, giving a more angular appearance. This also provided additional aftermarket possibilities, such as the removal of the front turn signals and the repurposing of the parking lights as directional or hazard markers while stopped.

In 2002, Cycle World reported fuel mileage of 38 mpg_{‑US} (6.2 L/100 km; 46 mpg_{‑imp}), a 0 to 60 mph (0 to 97 km/h) time of 2.9 seconds, a 0 to 1/4 mi (0.00 to 0.40 km) time of 10.32 seconds at 137.60 mph (221.45 km/h), and a top speed of 167 mph (269 km/h).

== 2004–2005 (RN12) ==
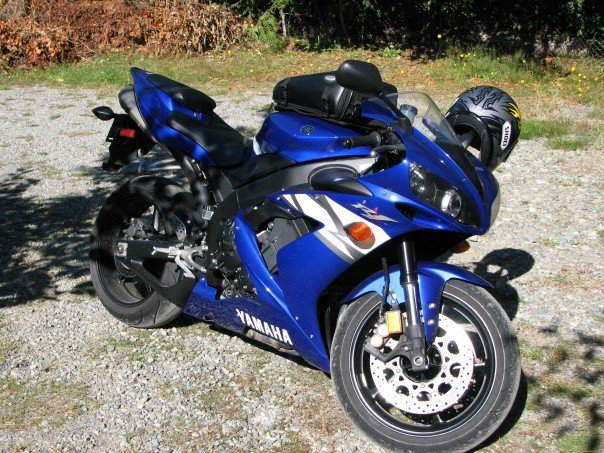
2004 YZF-R1

With the competition advancing, Yamaha made some major changes to the R1. This included style updates, like an underseat dual exhaust, and performance upgrades including radial brakes, and, for the first time, a ram-air intake. Furthermore, earlier models' tendency for wheelies was reduced by changing the geometry of the frame and weight distribution. The all-new engine was no longer used as a stressed member of the chassis, and had a separate top crankcase and cylinder block.

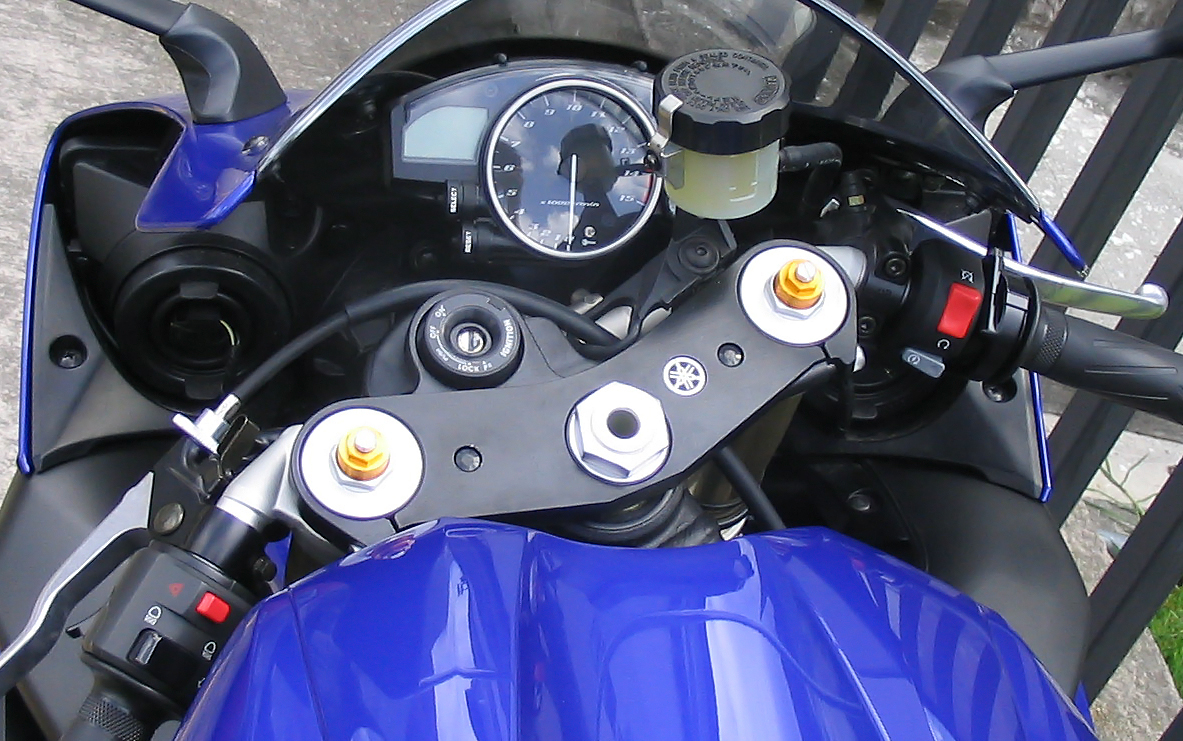
2005 YZF-R1 instrumentation

The 2004 R1 weighs 172 kg (379 lb) dry. The conventional front brake calipers were replaced by radially mounted calipers, activated by a radial master cylinder. A factory-installed steering damper was also added in 2004. Combined with the changes to the frame, this helped to eliminate the tendency of the handlebars to shake violently during rapid acceleration or deceleration on less-than-perfect surfaces, a phenomenon known as speed wobble or a tank slapper.

Motorcycle Consumer News tests of the 2004 model year YZF-R1S yielded a 0 to 60 mph (0 to 97 km/h) time of 3.04 seconds and 0 to 100 mph (0 to 161 km/h) of 5.42 seconds, a quarter-mile time of 9.90 seconds at 144.98 mph (233.32 km/h), and a top speed of 189 mph (304 km/h).

== 2006 (RN12) ==
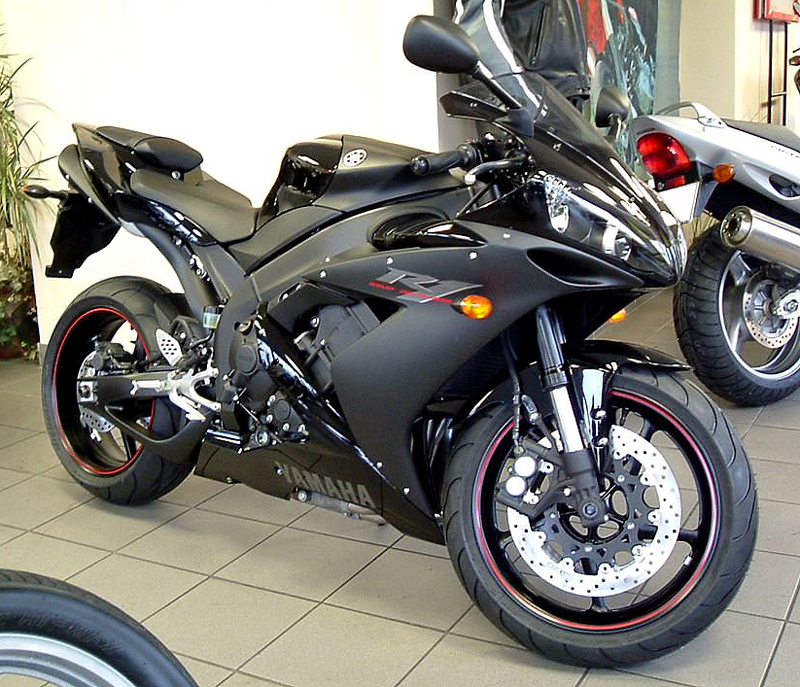
2006 YZF-R1

The R1's swingarm was extended by 20 mm (0.79 in) to reduce instability during acceleration.

That year, Yamaha also released a limited-edition version, the LE, in original Yamaha racing colors to celebrate its 50th anniversary. The LE and SP models had custom Öhlins front and rear suspension units developed by the same team as the YZR-M1 MotoGP bike. Custom forged aluminum Marchesini wheels specifically designed for the LE shaved nearly a pound off the bike's unsprung weight. A back torque-limiting slipper clutch and an integrated lap timer rounded out the package, essentially making the LE a production racer. Only 500 units were made for the United States, with another 500 units for Europe.

== 2007–2008 (RN19) ==
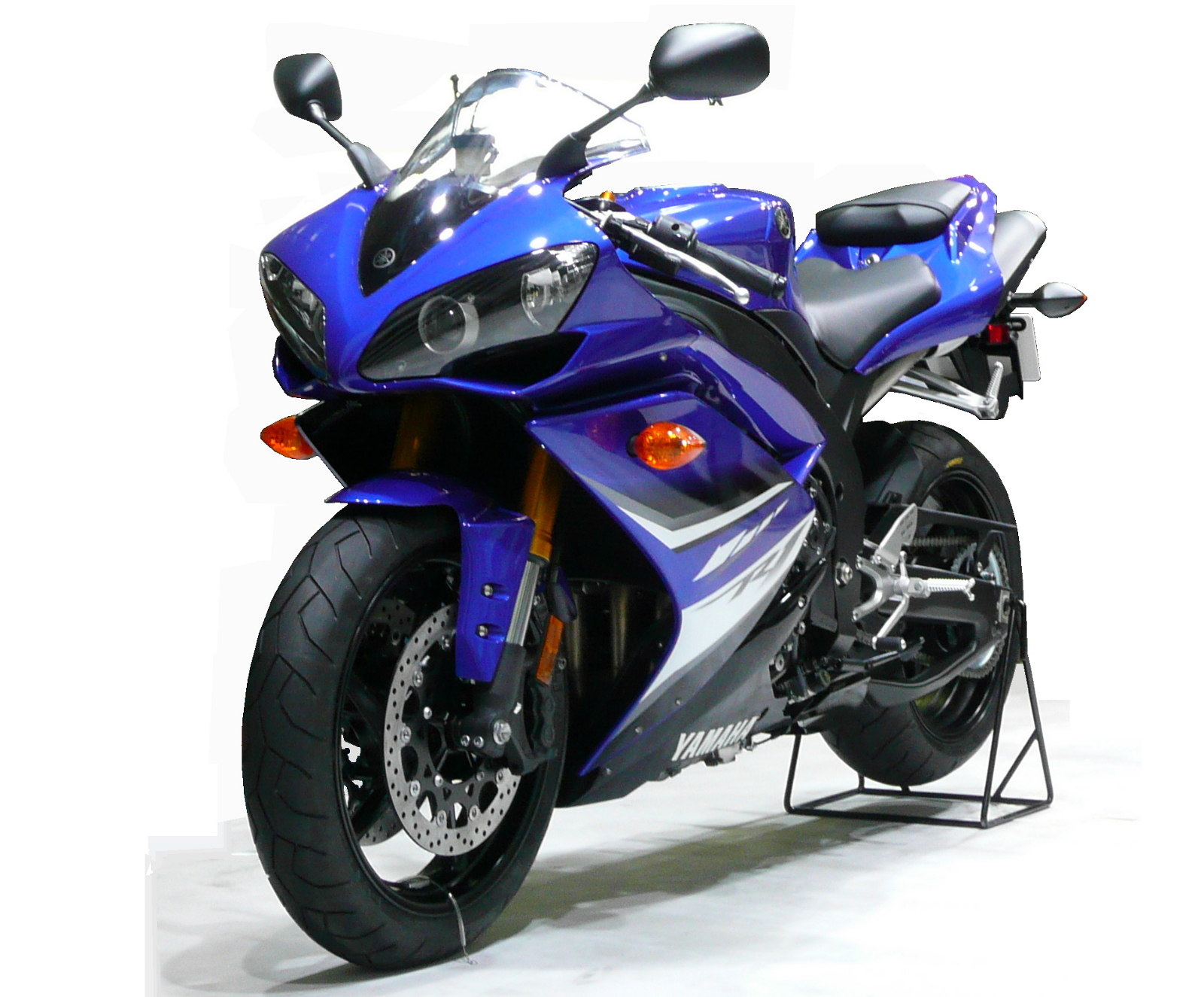
2007-2008 YZF-R1

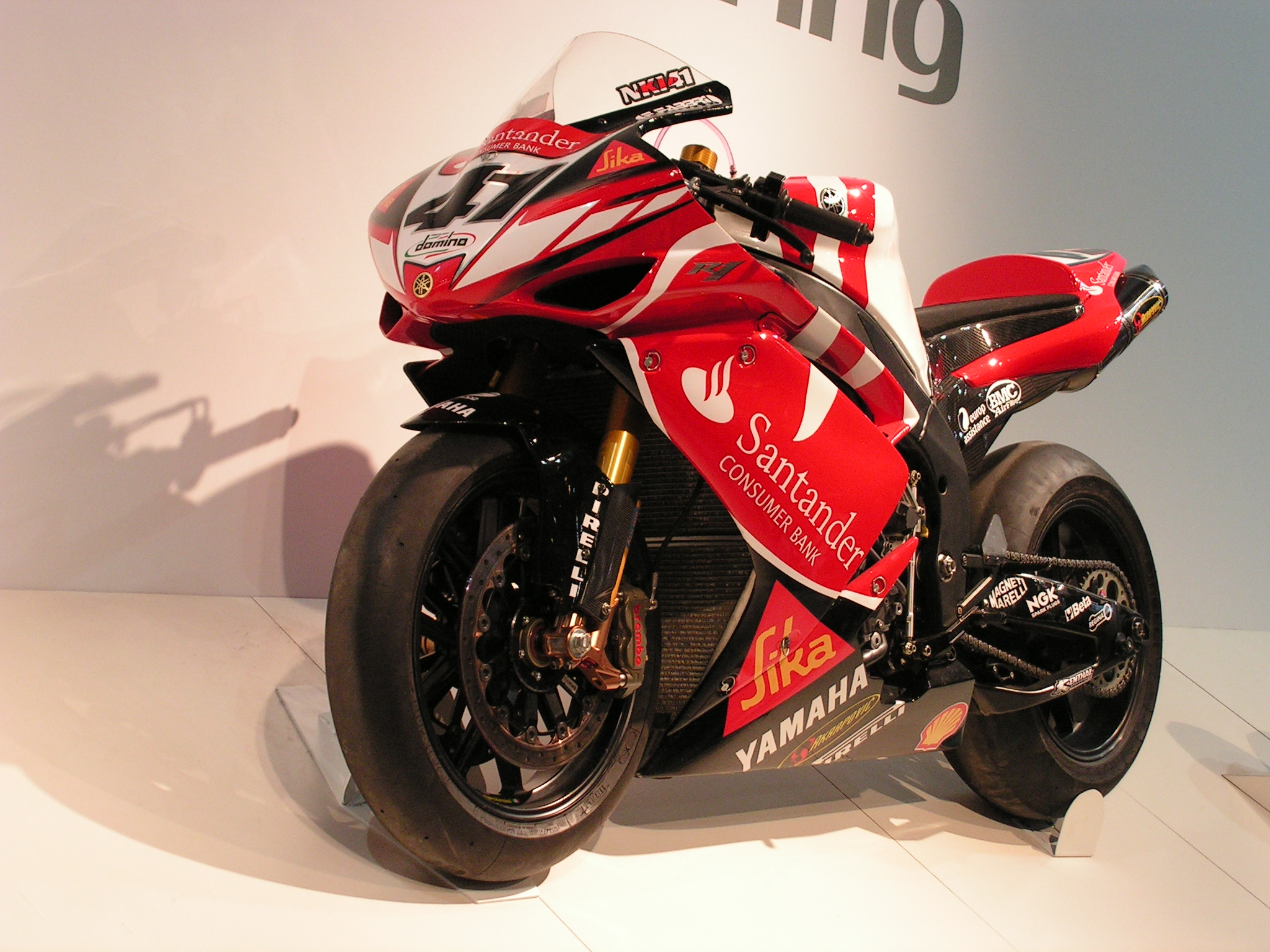
2007 Yamaha YZF-R1 used by Noriyuki Haga in the Superbike World Championship.

An all-new YZF-R1 for the 2007 model year was announced on 8 October 2006. It had an all-new inline-four engine, going back to a more conventional four-valve-per-cylinder design rather than Yamaha's trademark five-valve Genesis layout. It also had the Yamaha Chip Control Intake (YCC-I) electronic variable-length intake funnel system, Yamaha Chip Control Throttle (YCC-T) fly-by-wire throttle system, slipper clutch, all-new aluminum Deltabox frame and swingarm, six-piston radial-mount front brake calipers with 310 mm discs, a wider radiator, and M1 styling on the new large ram-air intakes in the front fairing. There were no major changes for 2008.

Power at the rear wheel was 156.7 hp (116.9 kW) at 10,160 rpm. Motorcycle Consumer News tests of the 2007 model year YZF-R1 yielded a 0 to 60 mph (0 to 97 km/h) time of 2.94 seconds and 0 to 100 mph (0 to 161 km/h) of 5.46 seconds, a ¼ mile time of 9.88 seconds at 145.50 mph (234.16 km/h).

== 2009–2014 (RN22) ==
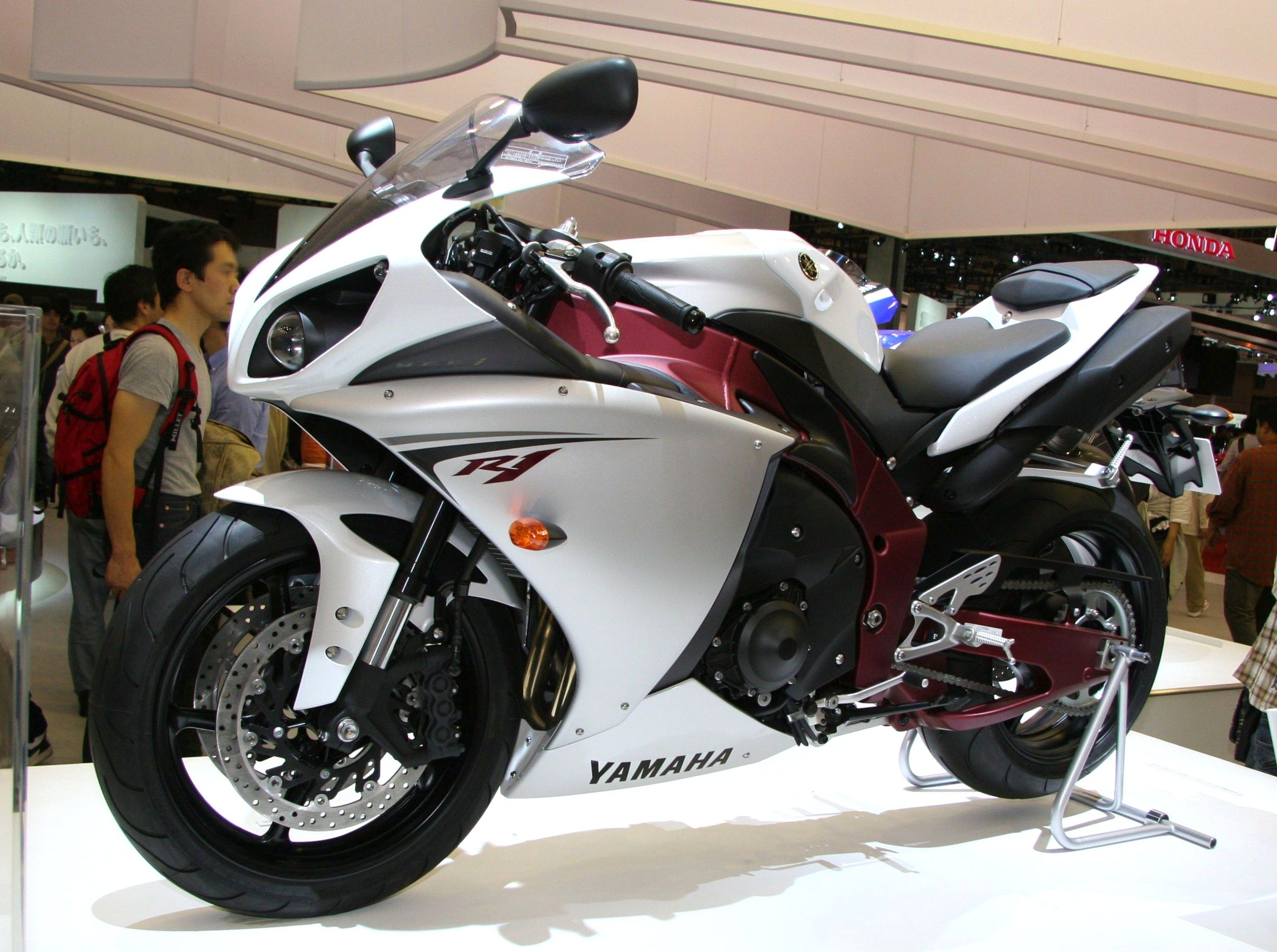
2009 YZF-R1 Limited Launch Edition

In late 2008, Yamaha announced they would release an all new R1 for 2009. The new R1 took engine technology from the M1 MotoGP bike with its crossplane crankshaft, making the 2009 R1 the first production sports bike to use a crossplane crankshaft. Power delivery is the same as with a 90° V4 with a 180° crank (such as the Honda VFR800, and similar to the 65° V4 in the Yamaha V-Max). Yamaha claimed the bike would give the rider "two engines in one", with the low-end torque of a twin and the pace of an inline-four. As with the previous incarnation of the R1, the 2009 model used Yamaha Chip Control Throttle (YCC-T).

Another advancement included in the 2009 model was D-Mode Throttle Control Valve Mapping, which allows a rider to choose between three distinct maps depending on the rider's environment. Each mode of operation controls YCC-T characteristics, changing how the R1 reacts to rider input. The first mode is Standard Mode, which delivers performance for a wide variety of driving conditions. The second mode is "A" mode, which will give a rider more available power in the lower to mid RPM range. The third mode is "B" mode, a dialling back of the previous mode designed to soften throttle response in inclement weather and heavy traffic. D-Mode throttle control is controlled by the rider through a forward mode button near the throttle. The instrument panel was more comprehensive than previous models, and the 2009/2010 Yamaha YZF-R1 model had a gear indicator as standard.

Overall handling of the R1 was improved through changes to frame and suspension. A new cast magnesium subframe was designed for the 2009 R1, resulting in lower weight and aiding mass centralisation. The rear shock absorber on the 2009 offers variable speed damping, as well as easy-to-tweak screw-adjustable preload. The rear shock absorber connected underneath the swing arm via a linkage, a change from previous models. To improve overall handling and safety, Yamaha included an electronic steering damper.

The front had the same classic R1 design cues, though the air-intake location and headlamp design were revamped on the 2009 model. This new design used only projector lamps in the headlights and used the newfound design space on the nose to position ram-air intakes next to the lights.

Testing the 2010 model on a tri-oval racetrack, Motorcyclist magazine reported a 0 to 1/4 mi (0.00 to 0.40 km) time of 10.02 seconds at 144.23 mph (232.12 km/h), and fuel consumption of 25 mpg_{‑US} (9.4 L/100 km; 30 mpg_{‑imp}). Motorcycle Consumer News reported a tested top speed of 176.7 mph (284.4 km/h).

In 2012, the Yamaha YZF-R1 received traction control and a redesigned nose, and a special edition 50th Anniversary R1 was released. The special edition commemorates the participation of Yamaha in MotoGP, and its colours are inspired by the Assen TT-winning MotoGP bike. Only 2000 units of this edition were made.

== 2015–2016 (RN32) ==
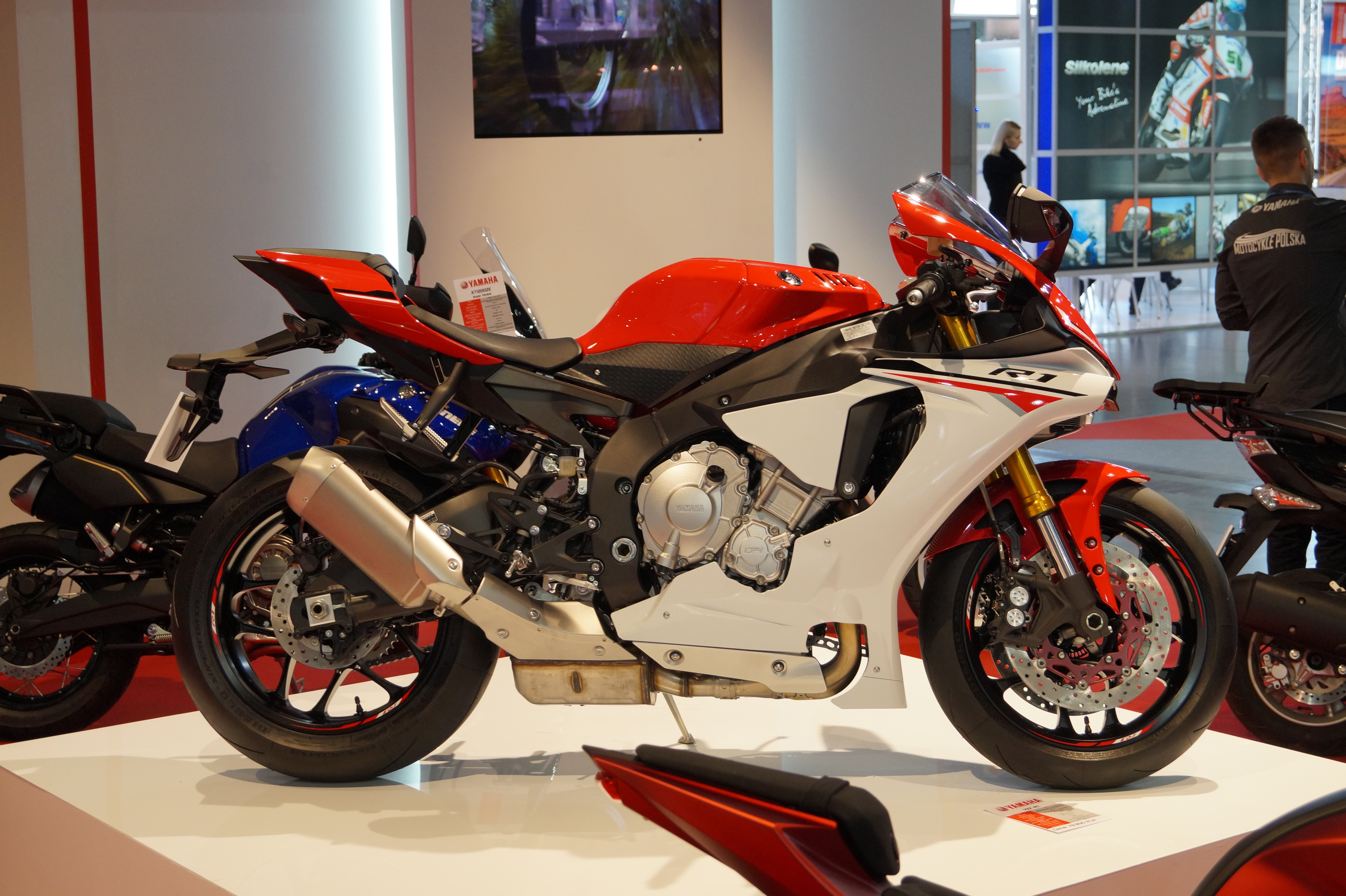
2015 Yamaha R1

At the centennial EICMA motorcycle show, Yamaha officially unveiled a new generation of R1, similar to the contemporary YZR M1. Yamaha claims a wet weight of 199 kg (439 lb). Engine changes include a decreased bore-to-stroke ratio, a larger airbox, a finger-follower valve system, and fracture split titanium conrods. Magnesium wheels are standard, and information is presented to the rider through a user-customizable thin-film display.

The new bike has an electronics package that includes a sophisticated Traction Control System (TCS), a Slide Control System (SCS), an anti-wheelie Lift Control System (LIF), linked antilock brakes, a Launch Control System (LCS), a Quick Shift System (QSS), and selectable power modes. The Slide Control System on the R1 is the first on a production motorcycle. Information is fed to the bike through a six-axis inertial measurement unit and other sensors over 100 times a second. Power delivery is tapered through throttle valve manipulation and ignition and fuel cuts.

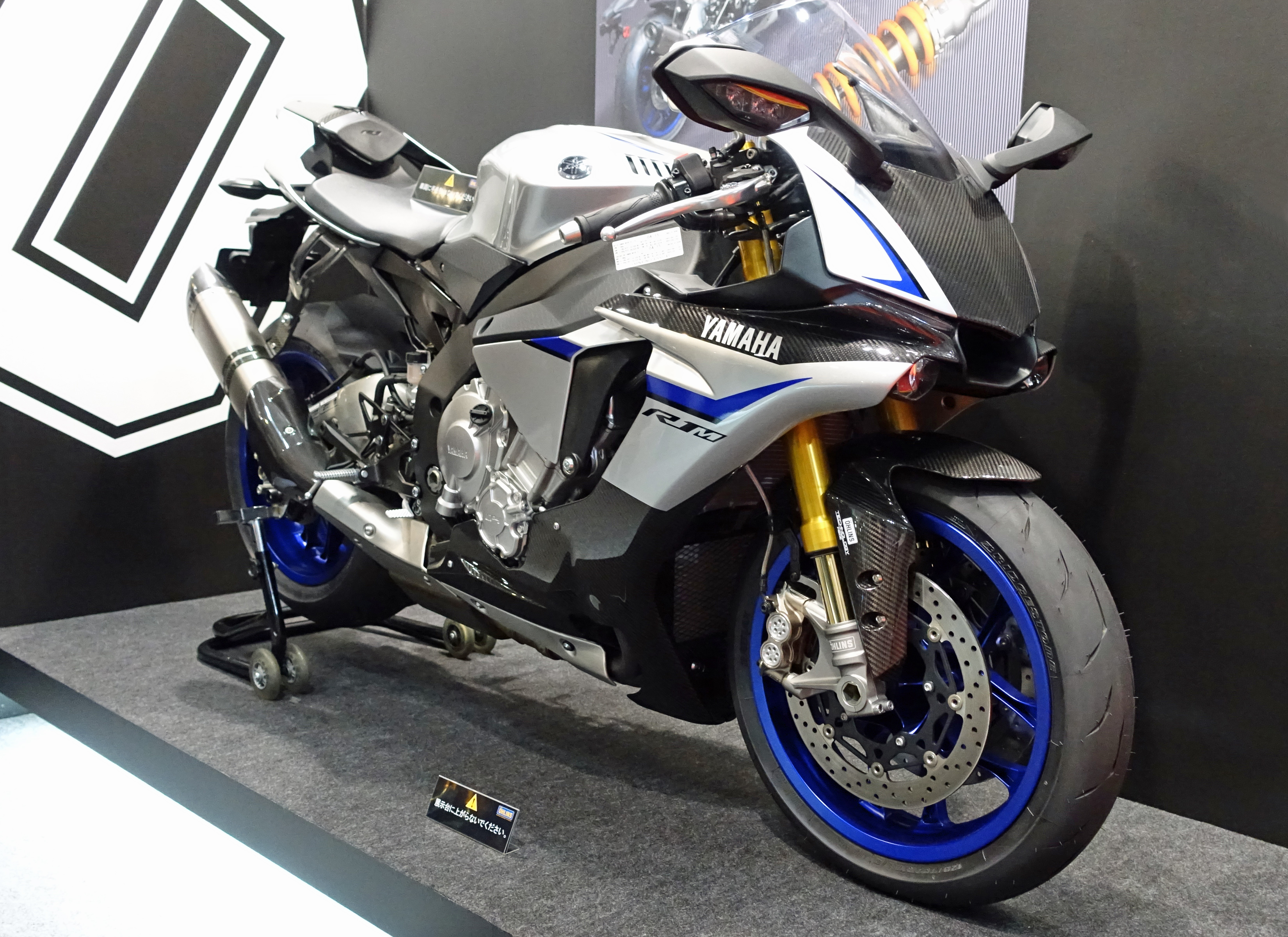
Yamaha R1M at 2015 Tokyo Motor Show

A second higher-spec, limited production model called the R1M is also produced, and is differentiated from the standard model by having more expensive components, such as electronic semi-active Öhlins suspension, carbon fiber bodywork, Yamaha's Communication Control Unit (CCU), a Y-TRAC data logging system, and grippier Bridgestone tires with a larger rear 200/55 size.

Starting in 2016, the lower-spec R1S model has also been offered.

== 2017–2019 (RN49) ==
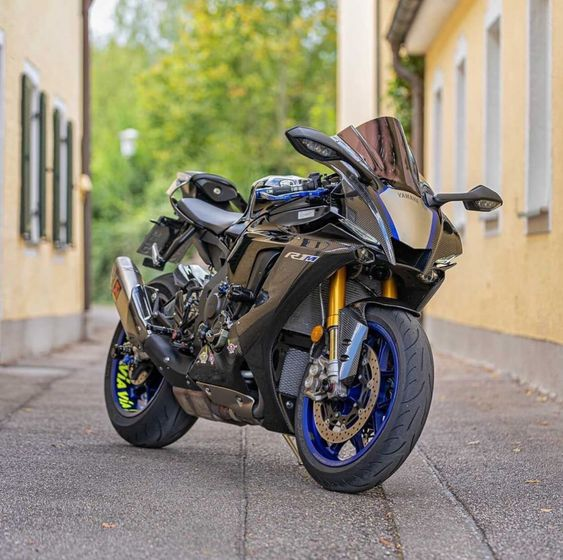
2018 Yamaha R1M

At EICMA 2017 Yamaha presented the next generation of R1 and R1M. They have a better Quick Shift System, an updated lift (wheelie) control system and fulfill Euro 4 requirements. The R1M got a new Öhlins Electronic Racing Suspension. In 2019 next new models started.

== 2020–present (RN65) ==
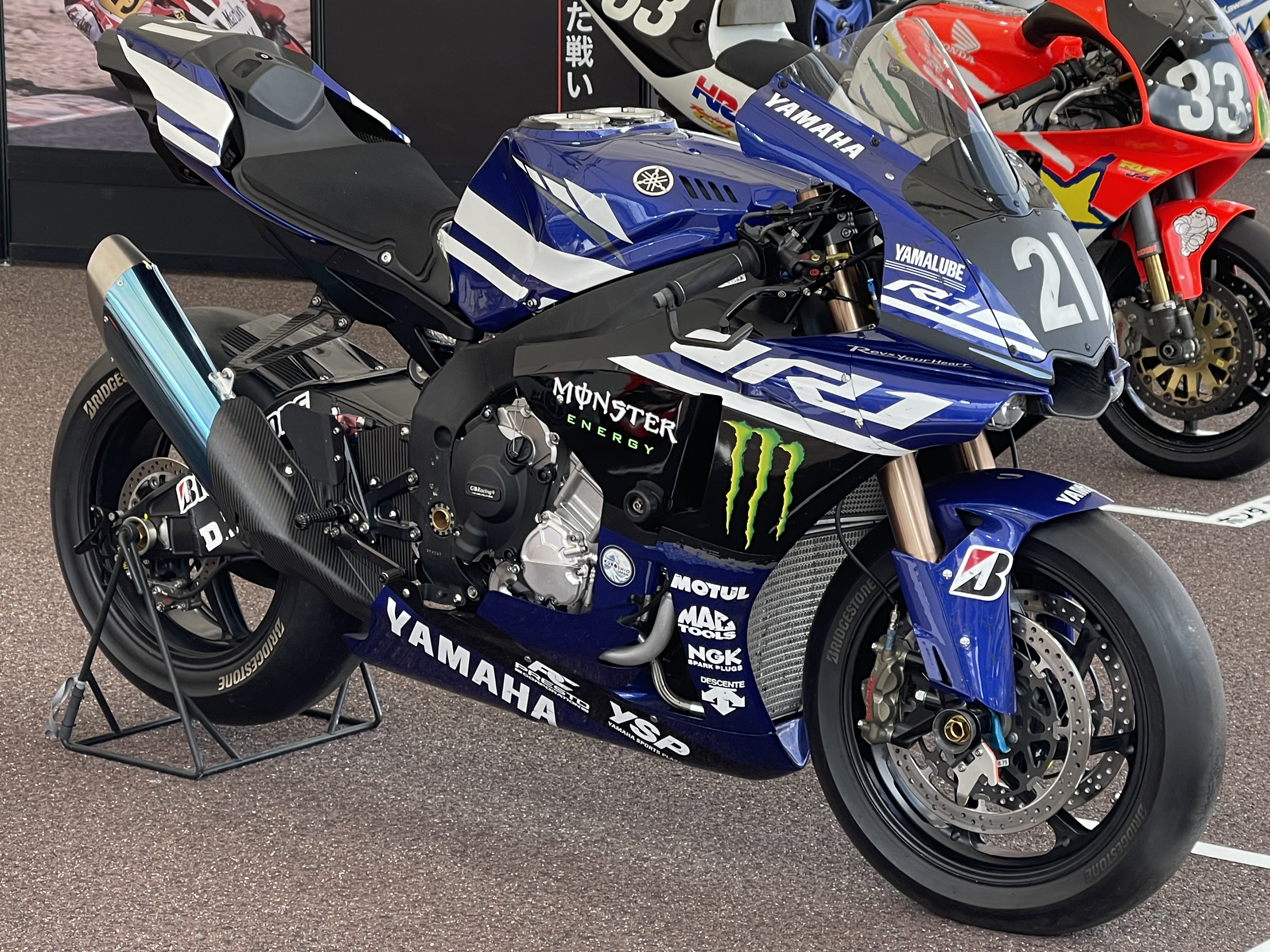
2022 Yamaha R1

Stacked with cutting-edge technology gleaned directly from MotoGP and Superbike competition, the YZF-R1 features a powerful 998cc crossplane CP4 engine, refined Deltabox frame, MotoGP®-inspired carbon fiber winglets and a comprehensive electronics package for the ultimate in performance and control. Premium Brembo® front brakes and a highly refined KYB® suspension further enhance its track-focused capability. It all comes wrapped in sleek, distinctive R-series styling for an aggressive look to match its advanced performance.

998cc, liquid-cooled inline 4 cylinder DOHC; 4-valves per cylinder
| Bore x Stroke | 79.0mm x 50.9mm |
| Compression Ratio | 13.0:1 |
| Fuel Delivery | Fuel injection with YCC-T and YCC-I |
| Transmission | 6-speed; wet multiplate assist and slipper clutch |
| Final Drive | Chain |
| Fuel Capacity | 4.5 gal |

=== CHASSIS ===
| Suspension/Front | 43mm KYB® inverted fork, fully adjustable; 4.7-in travel |
| Suspension/Rear | KYB® single shock, fully adjustable; 4.7-in travel |
| Brakes/Front | Dual 320mm hydraulic disc; Brake Control System and ABS |
| Brakes/Rear | 220mm hydraulic disc; Brake Control System and ABS |
| Tires/Front | 120/70ZR17 Bridgestone® BATTLAX RACING STREET RS11F |
| Tires/Rear | 190/55ZR17 Bridgestone® BATTLAX RACING STREET RS11R |

=== DIMENSIONS ===
| LxWxH | 80.9 in x 27.2 in x 45.9 in |
| Seat Height | 33.7 in |
| Wheelbase | 55.3 in |
| Rake (Caster Angle) | 24.0° |
| Trail | 4.0 in |
| Max. Ground Clearance | 5.1 in |
| Fuel Capacity | 4.5 gal |
| Fuel Economy** | 33 mpg |
| Wet Weight*** | 448 lb |

== Specifications ==
| Year | 1998–1999 | 2000–2001 | 2002–2003 | 2004–2005 | 2006 | 2006 LE | 2007–2008 | 2009 | 2010 | 2012–2014 | 2015–2024 |
Engine
| Type | 998 cc (60.9 cu in), liquid-cooled, 20-valve, DOHC, inline four-cylinder | | | | | | 998 cc, liquid-cooled, 16-valve, DOHC, inline four-cylinder | 998 cc, liquid-cooled, 16-valve (titanium), DOHC, in-line four-cylinder, cross-plane crankshaft | | | |
| Bore × stroke | 74 mm × 58 mm (2.9 in × 2.3 in) | | | 77 mm × 53.6 mm (3.03 in × 2.11 in) | | | | 78 mm × 52.2 mm (3.07 in × 2.06 in) | | | 79 mm x 50.9 mm |
| Fuel system | Carburetor | Mikuni BDSR40 carburetors with TPS | Mikuni fuel injection | Fuel injection, motor-driven secondary throttle valves | Fuel injection, dual-valve throttle bodies with motor-driven secondary valves | | Fuel Injection with YCC-T and YCC-I | | | | |
| Compression ratio | 11.8:1 | | | 12.5:1 | | | 12.7:1 | 12.3 : 1 | | | 13.0 : 1 |
| Rev limiter | 13,750 rpm | | | | | | | | | | |
| Manufacturer rated horsepower (crank) | 150 hp (110 kW) | 150.0 hp (111.9 kW) @ 10,000 rpm | 152.0 hp (113.3 kW) @ 10,500 rpm | 172 hp (128 kW), 180 hp (130 kW) with ram air | | | 132.4 kW (177.6 hp) @ 12,500 rpm / 139.0 kW (186.4 hp) @ 12,500 rpm with ram air | 191 hp (142 kW) @ 12,500 rpm without ram air | | | 199 hp (148 kW); 200.0 hp (149.1 kW)(with track only Circuit ECU) |
| Rear wheel horsepower | , | | , | | | | | | | | 162.4 hp (121.1 kW)@ 12,720 rpm |
| Torque | 72.7 lb⋅ft (98.6 N⋅m), 72.0 lb⋅ft (97.6 N⋅m) @ 8,250 rpm | | 70.4 lb⋅ft (95.4 N⋅m) | | 106.6 N⋅m (78.6 lbf⋅ft) @ 10,500 rpm (claimed) | | 75.5 lb⋅ft (102.4 N⋅m), 73.6 lb⋅ft (99.8 N⋅m) @ 8,150 rpm | 76.2 lb⋅ft (103.3 N⋅m) | | | 78.6 lb⋅ft (106.6 N⋅m),@ 8,790 rpm (rear wheel) |
| Final drive | #530 O-ring chain | | | | | | | | | | 525 O-ring chain |
| Ignition | TCI | | | | | | | | | | |
| Transmission | 6-speed w/ multi-plate clutch | | | | | 6-speed w/ multi-plate slipper clutch | | | | | 6-speed w/multi-plate coil spring slipper clutch |
Chassis
| Brakes/Front | Dual 298 mm discs | | | Dual 320 mm discs, radial calipers | | | Dual 310 mm discs, radial-mount forged 6-piston calipers | | | | Hydraulic dual disc, Ø 320 mm |
| Brakes/Rear | Single Piston (Pin Sliding) Caliper w/ 240 mm disc | | Single Piston (Pin Sliding) Caliper w/ 220 mm disc | | | | | | | | |
| Suspension/Front | 41 mm inverted telescopic fork | | 43 mm inverted telescopic fork, 120 mm (4.7 in) travel | | | | | | | | |
| Suspension/Rear | Single shock, adj. preload, compression damping, rebound damping, 130 mm (5.1 in) travel | | | Single shock, 130 mm (5.1 in) travel | Single shock, adj. preload, compression damping, rebound damping, 130 mm (5.1 in) travel | Single Öhlins shock, adj. preload, adj. high-/low-speed compression damping, rebound damping, 130 mm (5.1 in) travel | Single shock, piggyback reservoir, spring preload, adj. high-/low-speed compression damping, rebound damping | | Swingarm, 120 mm travel | (link suspension), Monoshock, 120 mm travel | Swingarm, (link suspension), 120 mm travel |
| Tires/Front | 120/70-ZR17 | | | | | | | | | | |
| Tires/Rear | 190/50-ZR17 | | | | | | | 190/55-ZR17 | | | |
Dimensions
| Length | | 2,035 mm (80.1 in) | | 2,065 mm (81.3 in) | 2,090 mm (82.1 in) | | 2,060 mm (81.1 in) | 2,070 mm (81.5 in) | 2,070 mm (81 in) | | 2,055 mm (80.9 in) |
| Width | | 695 mm (27.4 in) | | 720 mm (28 in) | 720 mm (28.3 in) | | | 710 mm (28.1 in) | 715 mm (28.1 in) | | 690 mm (27 in) |
| Height | | 1,095 mm (43.1 in) | | 1,105 mm (43.5 in) | 1,100 mm (43.5 in) | | 1,110 mm (43.7 in) | 1,130 mm (44.5 in) | 1,130 mm (44 in) | | 1,150 mm (45 in) |
| Seat height | 800 mm (31 in) | 815 mm (32.1 in) | 818 mm (32.2 in) | 815 mm (32.1 in) | 835 mm (32.9 in) | | | 830 mm (32.8 in) | 835 mm (32.9 in) | | 855 mm (33.7 in) |
| Wheelbase | 1,415 mm (55.7 in) (1,394 mm (54.9 in) claimed) | 1,395 mm (54.9 in) | | | 1,415 mm (55.7 in) | | | | | | |
| Rake | 24.0° | | | | | | | | | | |
| Trail | | 92 mm (3.6 in) | 103 mm (4.1 in) | 97 mm (3.8 in) | | | 100 mm (4.0 in) | | | 102 mm (4.0 in) | 102 mm (4.0 in) |
| Fuel capacity | 18 L (4.0 imp gal; 4.8 US gal) | | 17 L (3.7 imp gal; 4.5 US gal) | 18 L (4.0 imp gal; 4.8 US gal) | | | | | 18 L (4.0 imp gal; 4.8 US gal) | | 17 L (3.7 imp gal; 4.5 US gal) |
| Dry weight | 190.1 kg (419 lb) | 187.8 kg (414 lb) | 187 kg (412 lb) | 172.0 kg (379.2 lb) | 172.8 kg (381 lb) | 173.7 kg (383 lb) | 177 kg (390 lb) | 177 kg (390 lb), 203.2 kg (448 lb) | | | |
| Wet weight(incl. oil and full fuel tank) | 198.2 kg (437 lb) (claimed) | 200.9 kg (443 lb) | 193 kg (425 lb), 194 kg (428 lb) (Cali) | | | | | 206 kg (454 lb) (claimed), 216.4 kg (477 lb) | 206 kg | | 199 kg (439 lb) |
Performance
| Top speed | 270 km/h (168 mph) | | 278 km/h (173 mph) | 304 km/h (189 mph) | | | 293 km/h (182 mph) | | | | |
| 0 to 97 km/h (0 to 60 mph) | 2.96 s | | 2.99 s | 3.04 s | | | 2.64 s | | | | |
| 0 to 161 km/h (0 to 100 mph) | 5.93 s | | 5.79 s | 5.42 s | | | 5.12 s | | | | |
| 0 to 1/4 mi (0.00 to 0.40 km) | 10.19 s | | 10.17 s | 9.90 s | | | 9.88 s | 10.05 s | | | 10.31 @ 148.12; 10.11 s @ 146.62 mph 9.83 s @ 149.91 mph |
| Braking 97 to 0 km/h (60 to 0 mph) | 34.7 m (113.9 ft) | | 35.1 m (115.3 ft) | 35.8 m (117.3 ft) | | | 35.9 m (117.9 ft) | 37.8 m (124.0 ft) | | | 38.4 m (126.0 ft) |
| Fuel consumption | 5.50 L/100 km; 51.4 mpg_{‑imp} (42.8 mpg_{‑US}) | | 5.67 L/100 km; 49.8 mpg_{‑imp} (41.5 mpg_{‑US}) | 5.65 L/100 km; 50.0 mpg_{‑imp} (41.6 mpg_{‑US}) | | | 6.53 L/100 km; 43.2 mpg_{‑imp} (36.0 mpg_{‑US}) | 8.0 L/100 km; 35.3 mpg_{‑imp} (29.4 mpg_{‑US}) | | | |
| CO_{2} | | | | | | | | | | | 168 g/km |

== Motorsport ==
The R1 achieved five victories in the Macau Grand Prix between 1999 and 2013. Lorenzo Alfonsi won the 2004 FIM Superstock 1000 Cup, followed by Didier Van Keymeulen in 2005.

Yamaha World Superbike riders Troy Corser and Noriyuki Haga finished 2nd and 3rd respectively in the 2008 Superbike World Championship season.

John McGuinness won the Senior TT and inaugural Superbike TT races at the 2005 Isle of Man TT.

Yamaha World Superbike rider Ben Spies won the 2009 Superbike World Championship title, recording 14 wins and 11 poles in his one season in WSBK. Pata Yamaha World Superbike rider Toprak Razgatlıoğlu won the 2021 Superbike World Championship title, recording 13 wins and 3 Superpoles.

The Yamaha Factory Racing Team with riders Katsuyuki Nakasuga, Pol Espargaro, and Bradley Smith won the 2015 Suzuka 8 Hours endurance race. Katsuyuki Nakasuga, Alex Lowes and Pol Espargaro won the 2016 Suzuka 8 Hours race. Katsuyuki Nakasuga, Alex Lowes, Michael van der Mark won the 2017 and 2018 Suzuka 8 Hours races.

Tommy Hill won the British Superbike title in 2011 on board a YZF-R1. Yamaha rider Josh Brookes won the 2015 title.

== See also ==
- List of fastest production motorcycles by acceleration
