= Yamaha FZ750 =

Japanese motorcycle produced 1985 to 1991

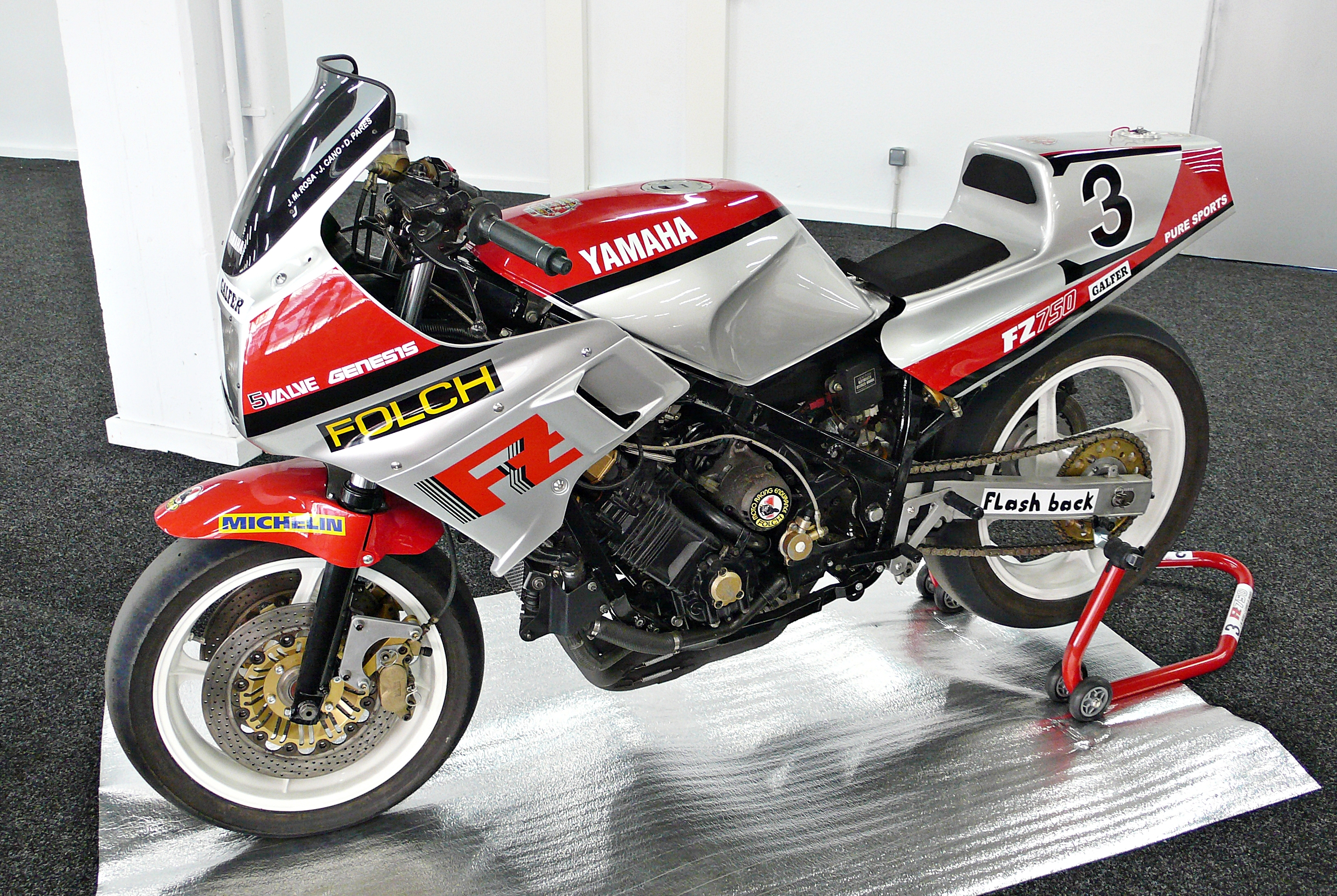
- 1985 Yamaha FZ750
- Manufacturer: Yamaha
- Production: 1985–1991
- Class: Sport
- Engine: 749.6 cc (45.74 cu in) liquid-cooled 20-valve DOHC in-line four-cylinder
- Bore / stroke: 68 mm × 51.6 mm (2.68 in × 2.03 in)
- Top speed: 230 km/h (140 mph)
- Power: 77 kW (103 hp) at 10,500rpm(Claimed)
- Transmission: 6-speed
- Suspension: Front telescopic forks: 39 mm
- Dimensions: L: 2225 mm W: 755 mm
- Seat height: 790 mm
- Weight: 224 kg (494 lb)(no fuel) (wet)
- Fuel capacity: 21 litres (4.6 imperial gallons)
- Related: Yamaha FZR1000, Bimota YB4

The Yamaha FZ750 is a sports motorcycle produced by Yamaha Motor Corporation between 1985 and 1991. The FZ750 is notable for several reasons, perhaps the most radical being the 5-valve cylinder head. This became something of a Yamaha trademark. The FZ750 would be the first bike in the Genesis design concept.

The bikes were known for their linear power delivery, with a maximum speed around 140 mph. The engine has a forward-inclined cylinder block which effectively lowers the centre of gravity. This results in a relatively long wheelbase, which hampered it when used for short circuit racing, but lowered the centre of gravity and provided an almost 50/50 weight distribution. What was clear was that Yamaha had considered the engine design as part of the overall package. The FZ750 show-cased Yamaha's design skills.

== Development ==
Yamaha began development in 1977 to replace the highly successful but then limited future two stroke motorcycles. Given a design brief that the engine (in race configuration) should develop at least the same power as the two stroke TZ750. The FZ750 would be the first motorcycle in what would become the Genesis concept where the advanced liquid-cooled multi-valve engine and perimeter type steel chassis would be designed to function together to provide enhanced power and handling. The Genesis concept would go on to form the basis for many future models by Yamaha.

The FZ750 was unveiled at the IFMA motorcycle show in Germany in the autumn of 1984. And 1991 would be the last year the machine would be listed.

== Design ==
=== Engine ===
The FZ750 uses an all-aluminium, liquid-cooled, transverse-mounted, four-cylinder engine. The complex cylinder head is constructed in two halves, with dual chain-driven overhead camshafts operating 20 valves, 3 inlet and 2 exhaust valves per cylinder. Although disputed in recent years, it was argued that for a given lift, the 3 inlet valves flowed more effectively than conventional twin inlet valves. What was indisputable was that their light weight allowed for faster opening speeds, and softer valve springs, all contributing to theoretical increases in engine speed and thus power outputs. Valve clearances are adjusted with under-lifter shims.

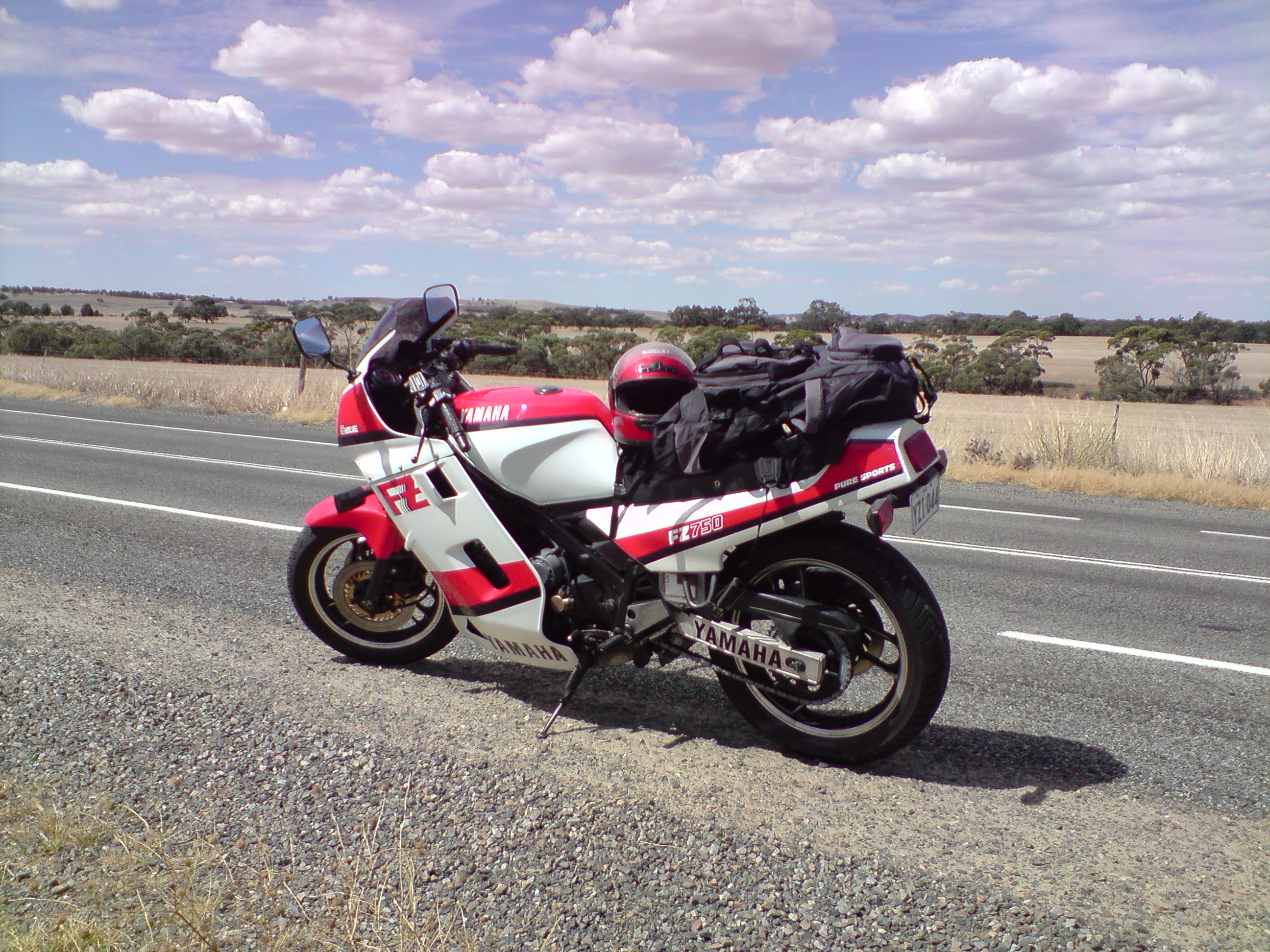
Yamaha FZ750 1FN, with optional Lockhart fairing lowers

The four 34 mm Mikuni constant-velocity downdraft carburettors are mounted in a bank behind and above the cylinders and feed each cylinder through short, straight and almost vertical inlet. The airbox is situated in what would conventionally be the forward part of the fuel tank. The fuel tank is situated behind and below the carburetors and fuel is lifted via an electric fuel pump. The four exhaust downpipes are crossover linked by cylinders 1-4 and 2-3 and exit through two silencers.

The crankshaft is geared directly to the clutch. No counter balancer shaft is used. The engine width is minimised by placing the starter clutch, alternator, water and oil pump behind the engine and are driven via a secondary shaft. Starting is by electric and lubrication is wet sump using a trochoid pump.

=== Transmission ===
The FZ750 uses a six-speed sequential close ratio gearbox; the gear shafts are only removable by splitting the crankcase halves. The clutch is of the wet, multi-plate type and is hydraulically operated. Final drive is by O-ring chain and sprockets. A safety feature of the FZ750 is that the engine ignition is cut if first gear is selected with the sidestand down; this is commonplace on modern motorcycles.

=== Chassis ===
The chassis was designed to facilitate the unique engine configuration. The frame of the FZ750 is manufactured from box-section steel and is of a perimeter type, with removable engine downtubes. The engine forms a stressed member of the chassis. The front fairing and upper rear section use separate sub-frames. The rear shock absorber which is remote adjustable for damping and spring preload is placed vertically behind the engine and connects to an extruded aluminium alloy swinging arm to provide a rising-rate suspension via two forged aluminium link arms. The 16-inch (410 mm) front wheel is suspended by air and oil damped forks.

=== Electrical system ===
The FZ750 features a 12 volt electrical system and had for the time featured advanced user features such a side stand cutout, oil level sensing and self cancelling indicators.

The FZ750 was also fitted with an AC Alternator (automotive) and not a fixed magnet Dynamo Generator and therefore does not need the separate regulator/rectifier which was common on other machines. The starter motor is mounted behind the cylinder block and drives the secondary shaft via a Sprag clutch.

A variable-resistance gauging system is used to monitor engine oil contents with an associated warning light. NippondensoTransistor Controlled Ignition is used in conjunction with two ignition coils. An electrical tachometer, (along with a mechanical Speedometer) fuel and temperature gauges are provided. An electrical reserve fuel system simulates a conventional fuel reserve by cutting power to the fuel pump when fuel in the tank reaches a certain level, reserve fuel could then be engaged from a switch. In this way the fuel pump never runs dry.

Where markets allowed a dual single unit headlight of 35w each was fitted but other markets required a single 55w headlight, that did not fit as well in the large rectangular opening. Self-cancelling indicators where fitted, which are distance controlled by a reed switch within the speedometer.

== FZ750 Models ==
FZ750 models can be split into three distinct model series in accordance with the first letter of the model suffix:

=== Series 1 1985–1987 (1AE, 1FN, 1FM, 1KT, 1FU, 1FT, 1FT) ===
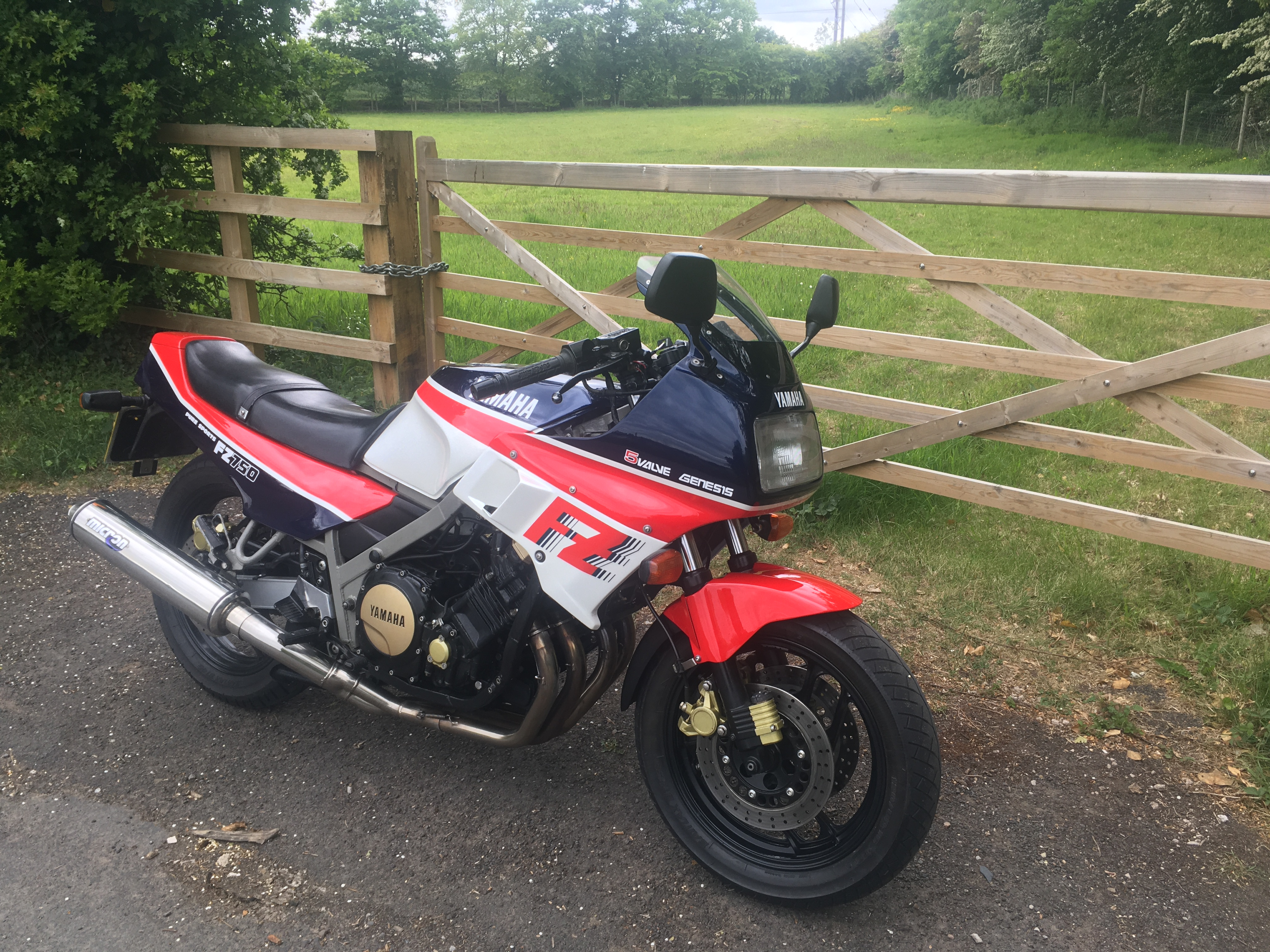
Yamaha FZ750 1FM

The definitive FZ and with short half fairing panels which displayed the forward inclined engine but covered the radiator sides gave the bike a very distinct styling. Very early models had an older style removable filler cap, large square indicators and ventilated discs brakes. Machines were fitted with twin headlight unit where the local market allowed. Japanese home market (1FM) had adjustable damping telescopic forks.

The later machines were fitted with an optional single seat hump (replacing the seat strap), aircraft-style filler cap, slimmer indicators, grab rail, Non ventilated discs and bellypan or a combination of all. An optional full fairing was also available.

=== Series 2 1987–1989 (2MG, 2KT, 2FM, 2FJ) ===
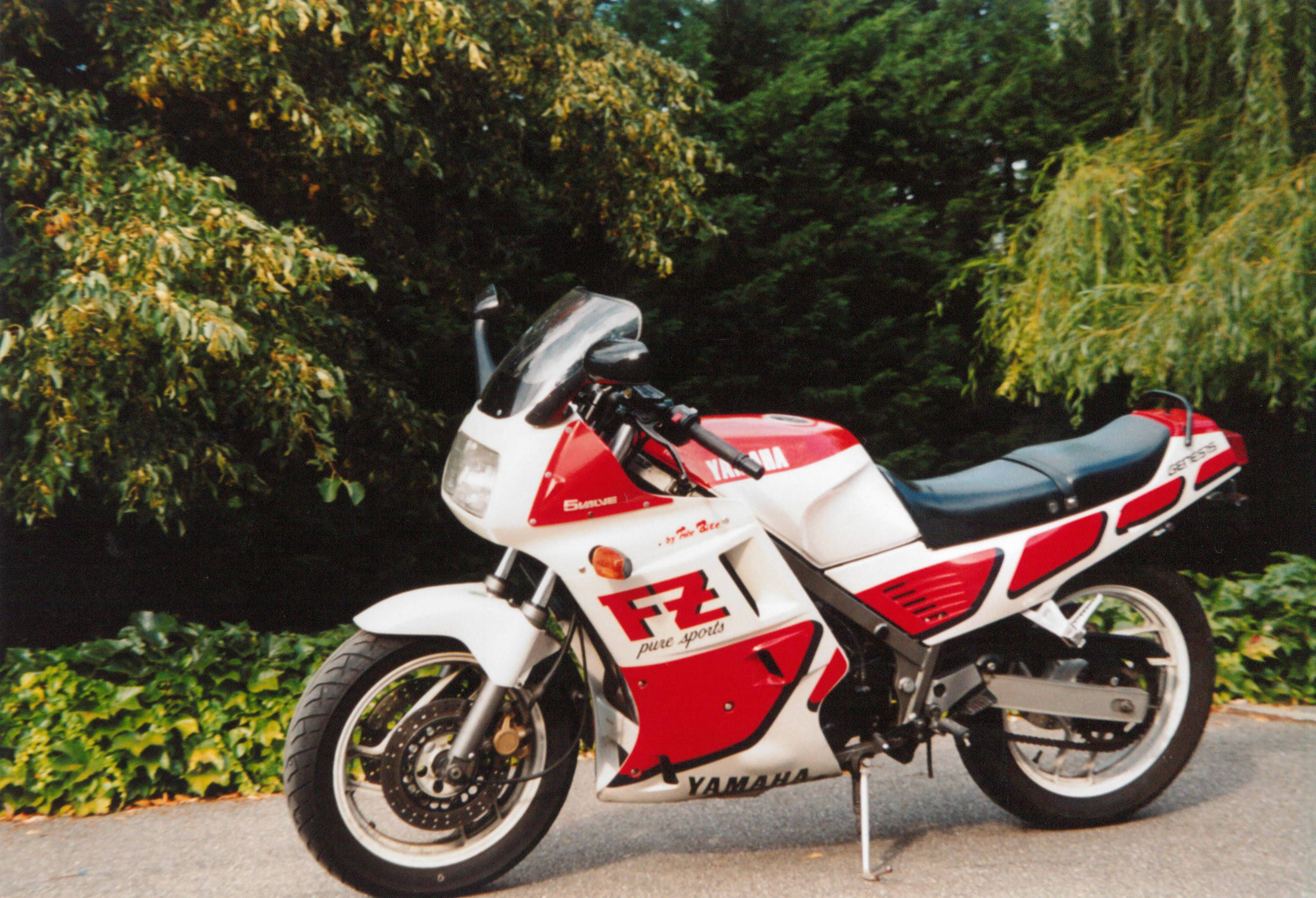
Yamaha FZ750 2MG

A considerable redesign saw a slight weight loss and a move to make the machine arguably more suitable for sports touring. Most noticeable was new full fairing panels, new sidepanels and a redesigned rear subframe that had integrated number plate/rear light. The front indicators were moved to exit through the bodywork.

Minor engine changes included slightly shorter pistons and longer connecting rods. A new digital ignition unit that required only a single pickup over the previous twin pickups and repositioned ignition coils. A push-pull throttle twin throttle cable system was installed. A 4-2 exhaust was replaced with a much lighter 4-1 system.

A side stand cutout was now provided on the redesigned sidestand. The rear suspension was altered to a forged steel 'dogbones' with an aluminum rocker, replacing the forged twin link type, this resulted in deletion of the centre stand. The remote adjuster for the rear shock was also deleted. The rear footpegs were now separate items with cast aluminum hangers and the machines now sported a red or blue 'speedblock' color scheme.

=== Series 3 1989–1991 (3BY, 3KS) ===
Only minor changes, which included a more subdued color schemes. New front brake discs up from 270mm to 300mm floating type, along with 4 piston calipers. The front wheel was now 17" and a slightly wider rear rim made the bike suitable for the latest radial tires and both wheels were a hollow spoke design.

In the United Kingdom and possibly other markets, some unsold 2MG bikes were brought up to series 3 standard, many were not registered until 1989 or later, but still carried the 2MG suffix. The 3BY models destined for Switzerland where restricted to 100hp.

== Other FZ750 Models ==
=== FZ700 ===
This model was officially sold only in the United States. A slightly reduced stroke of 48mm gave the FZ700 2KU a capacity of 697cc in order to beat the United States 1983 motorcycle tariff on motorcycles over 700cc. Despite being outwardly similar to any other series 2 machine, the engine had more in common with the FZR750 with lightweight pistons and connecting rods.

=== FZX750 ===
The sales success of the Yamaha VMAX led to a cruiser version of the FZ750 with a slightly detuned engine, as the Yamaha FZX750.

=== FZ750P ===
In 1987 Yamaha took advantage of the high performance and good stability of the FZ750 to release a police model FZ750P 2KW. Using a mixture of parts from previous Yamaha and FZ750 models the machine had a single seat and provision for police equipment, including a calibrated Speedometer. Some machines were imported to Taiwan to be used for escort duties after retirement from the Japanese Police Force.

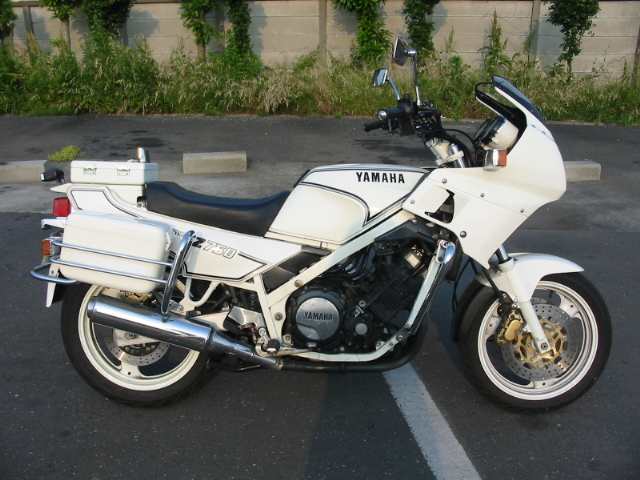
Yamaha FZ750P

=== FZ750 OU45 Factory Racer ===
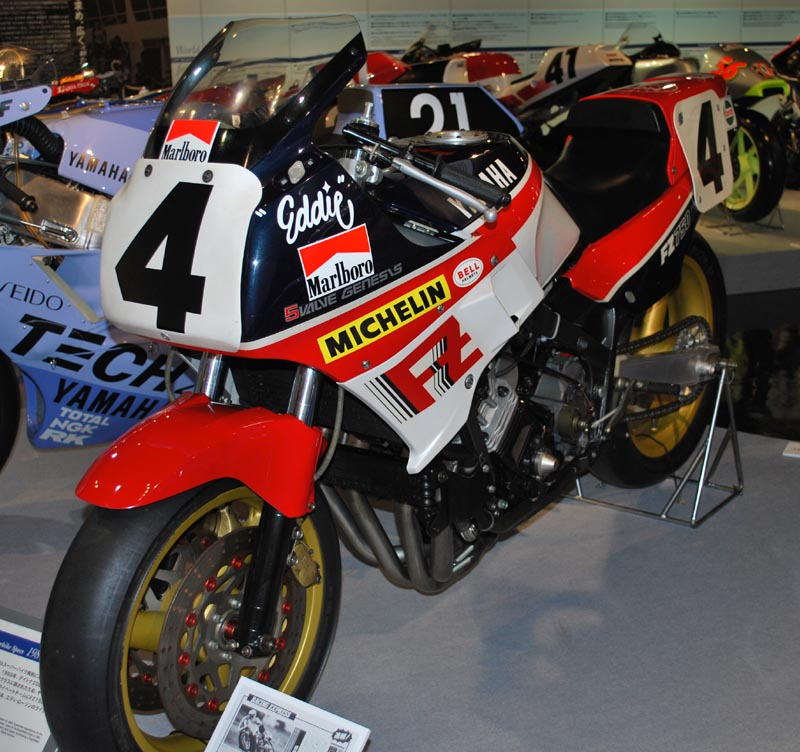
1986 Yamaha FZ750 OU45

Designed for competition in the AMA Superbike Championship Daytona 200, this machine was based on the FZ750 production model. With the transfer of the AMA Daytona 200 title from the Formula 1 class to the Superbike class in 1985, this machine recorded its 14th win ridden by Eddie Lawson in the 1986 Daytona 200. The bike contained many exotic parts such as a cable operated clutch, performance camshafts, dry clutch and oil cooler. Many of these parts found their way into the sought after factory race kit and onto the later FZR750/1000. Maximum power was somewhere in the region 95.6kW (130PS).

=== FZR750 OW74 Full Factory Endurance Racer ===
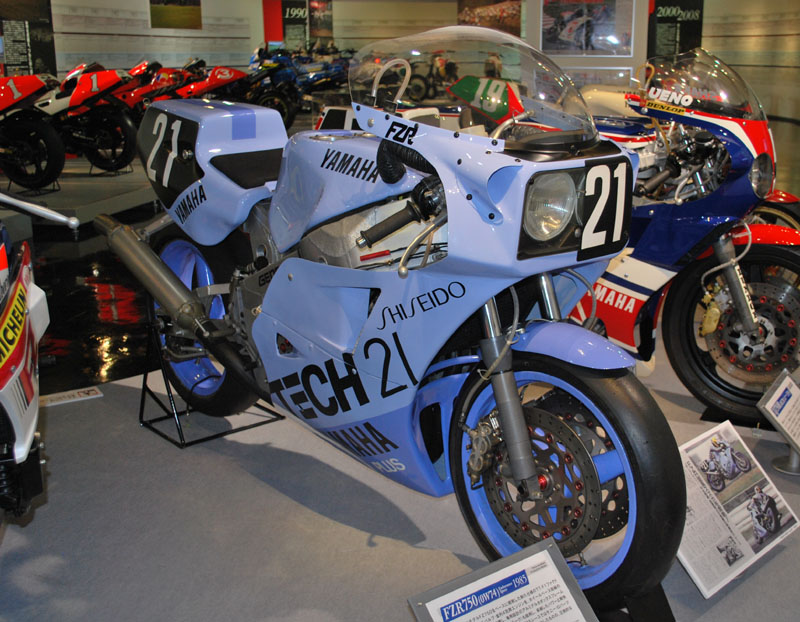
Yamaha FZR750 OW74 Suzuka 8H 1985

An endurance race spec TT-F1 factory machine based on the FZ750 production sports model. The engine featured a modified forward inclination of the cylinders from 45° to 35° to accommodate the shortened wheelbase and the adoption of the ram air intake system. A specially designed aluminum Deltabox frame related to the Yamaha YZR500 was fitted. These features would soon appear on the 1987 Yamaha FZR750/1000. In the 1985 Suzuka 8 hours Endurance Race, Kenny Roberts and Tadahiko Taira came close to winning but retired because of mechanical trouble in the final phase of the race.

== Museum examples ==
An example of a FZ750 1FN is preserved at the Barber Motorsports Park Museum. An example of a FZ750 1FN, the Daytona 200 winning works FZ750 OU45 and works endurance FZR750 OW74 are preserved at the Yamaha Communications Plaza.

== Motorsport ==
The FZ750 had a successful racing career Unusually at all levels of the sport from Clubman racing to full works International series. The bike still remains popular in the hands of privateers and is eligible for the Superstock racing class around the world. A factory Race Kit containing performance engine parts was made available.

Placed third in the Isle of Man TT Formula 1 race in 1985.

Placed first in the Castrol Six Hour and Arai 500 Bathurst in 1985 and 1986.

Placed first in the Castrol Six Hour (New Zealand) and the Daytona 200 in 1986

Placed first in the Superstock class of the North West 200 in 1987.

The FZ750 engine mounted in a Bimota chassis as the Bimota SB4 placed first in the inaugural Superbike World Championship round in 1987.

== Guinness World Records ==
In 1986 three Italian riders Norberto Naummi, Roberto Ghillani and Maurizio Foppiani attempted to break the non-stop endurance record which had been set by an Australian team nine years earlier. Ridden from 16 August to 8 September the FZ750 was always in motion even during refueling, tyre and the rider changes; which were conducted by a special vehicle that had been set up with special side brackets to hold the bike. The first record at a mileage of 10,000 kilometers was broken on 27 August beating the previous record comfortably, at more than double the previous average speed.

A blown main fuse on 8 September put an end to the attempt to further the record after 560 hours and 30370km, at which point the FZ750 had run for continually for 23 days.

== See also ==
- List of Yamaha motorcycles
