= Yamaha FZX750 =

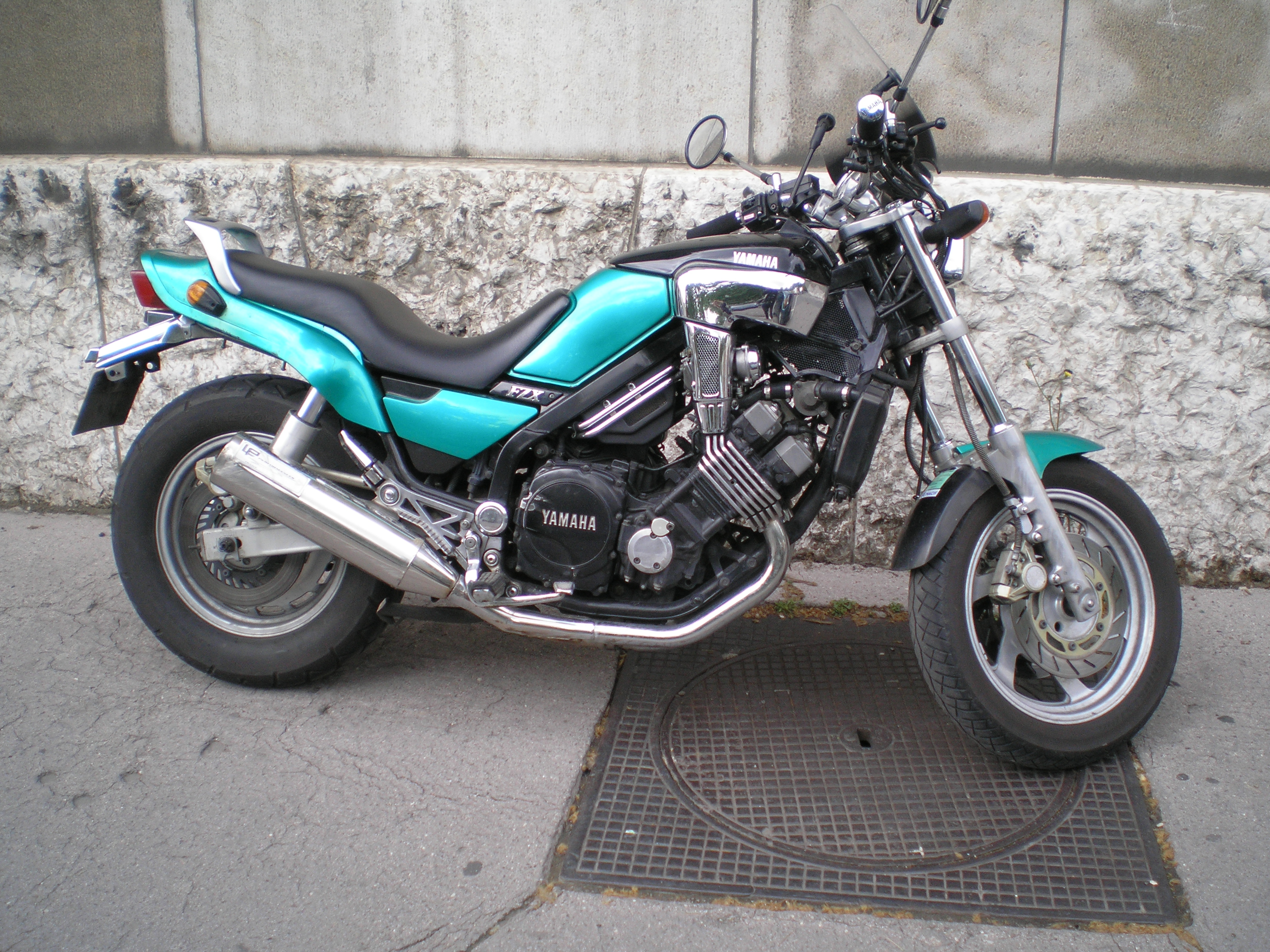
- Manufacturer: Yamaha
- Also called: FZX700 or FZX700S Fazer (US)
- Class: standard
- Engine: FZX750: 749 cc (45.7 cu in); FZX700: 698 cc (42.6 cu in) 20-valve DOHC in-line four-cylinder
- Bore / stroke: 68 mm × 51.6 mm (2.68 in × 2.03 in); 68 mm × 48 mm (2.7 in × 1.9 in)
- Top speed: FZX750: FZX700: 130–137 mph (209–220 km/h) @ 9500 rpm
- Power: FZX750: FZX700: 85 hp (63 kW) @ 9500 rpm 65 hp (48 kW) (rear wheel)
- Wheelbase: 1,520 mm (59.8 in)
- Seat height: 750 mm (29.5 in)
- Weight: FZX750: FZX700: 440 lb (200 kg) (dry); 223 kg (492 lb) (wet)
- Fuel capacity: 13 L; 2.8 imp gal (3.4 US gal)
- Fuel consumption: 4.94 L/100 km; 57.2 mpg_{‑imp} (47.6 mpg_{‑US})

The Yamaha FZX750 was a motorcycle made by Yamaha from the early 1980s until the mid-1990s. The US version was the FZX700 Fazer, imported only in 1986 and 1987, with a 50 cc smaller engine displacement to avoid import tariffs on motorcycles larger than 700 cc.

Its engine was a retuned version of the four-stroke DOHC twenty-valve four-cylinder inline engine found in the FZ750, producing ten BHP less than the 105 of the sports model, but having a stronger midrange. It had an almost solid rear wheel, low seat, and more chrome than would normally be expected. Unusually, it had downdraft carburettors built into the design of the thirteen-litre tank.
