= Yamaha Thunderace =

Motorcycle

Yamaha YZF1000R Thunderace
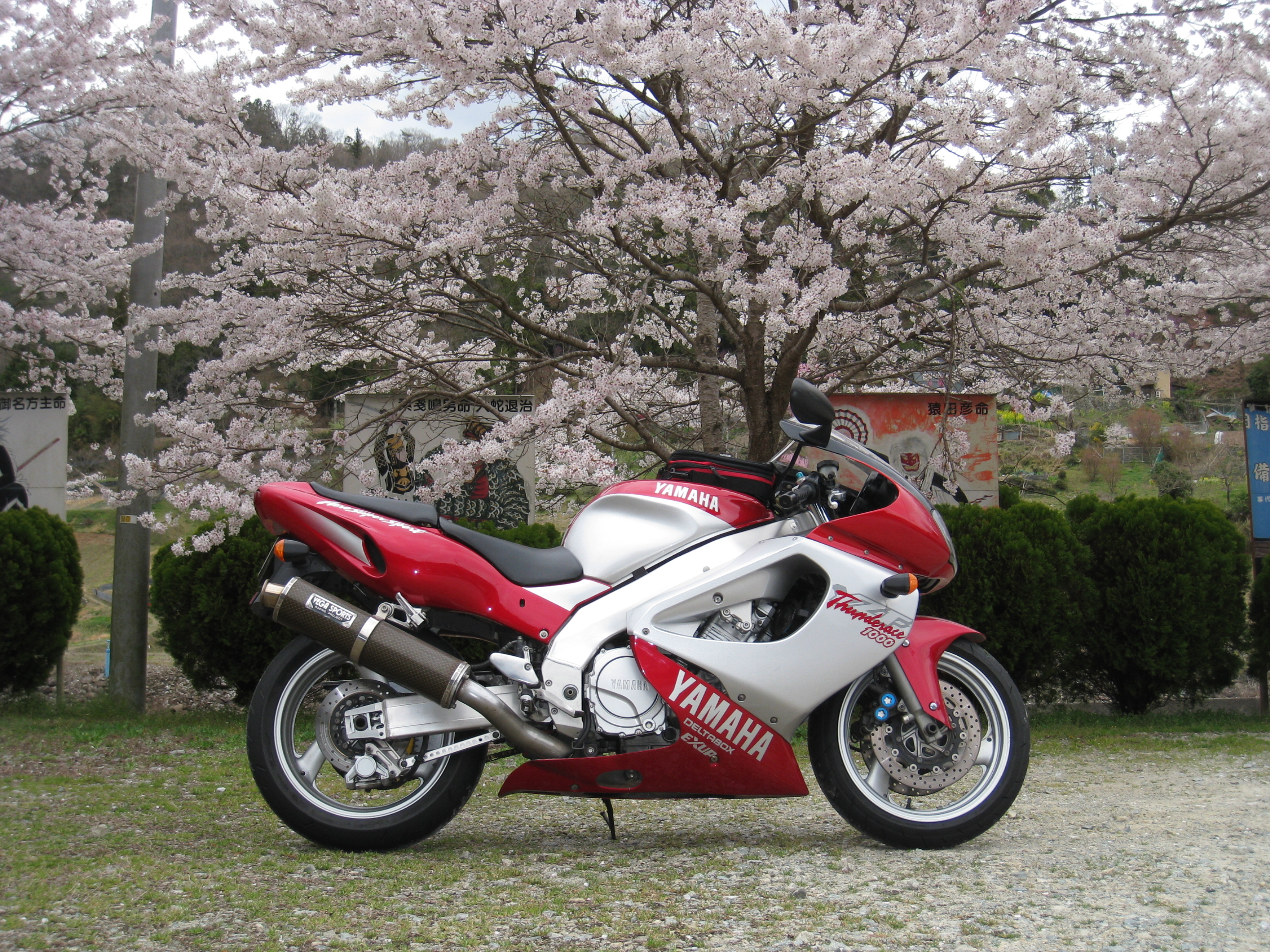
- Manufacturer: Yamaha
- Production: 1996-2005
- Predecessor: Yamaha FZR1000
- Successor: Yamaha YZF-R1
- Class: Sport bike
- Engine: 1,002 cc (61.1 cu in) Liquid-cooled 4-stroke DOHC 20-valve
- Bore / stroke: 75.5 mm × 56 mm (2.97 in × 2.20 in)
- Top speed: 164 mph (264 km/h)
- Power: 145 hp (108 kW) @ 10,000 rpm (claimed); 137.2 hp (102.3 kW) (rear wheel)
- Torque: 78.3 lb⋅ft (106.2 N⋅m) (rear wheel)
- Transmission: Constant Mesh 5-Speed.
- Suspension: Front 48 mm fork fully adjustable Rear mono shock fully adjustable
- Wheelbase: 1,430 mm (56 in)
- Dimensions: L: 2,085 mm (82.1 in); W: 740 mm (29 in)
- Seat height: 795 mm (31.3 in)
- Weight: 435 lb (197 kg) (dry); 512 lb (232 kg) (wet)

The Yamaha YZF1000R Thunderace was a motorcycle produced by Yamaha from 1996 until 2005.

The YZF1000R was a stop-gap bike from the FZR1000R EXUP to the YZF-R1 and produced from existing parts bins. The Thunderace five-valve four-cylinder engine was derived from the FZR1000R EXUP, and the frame was adapted from the YZF750R. The 5-speed gearbox from the FZR1000R EXUP was also reused. The Genesis engine has undergone some changes aimed at improving mid-range power rather than the maximum output, which remains 145 bhp (108 kW). The rotating mass of crankshaft and pistons have been lightened to improve throttle response, and new carburetors equipped with "Throttle Position Sensors" give the ignition some more data to help control the EXUP valve in the exhaust pipe.
