= Yamaha FZR1000 =

Motorcycle model produced by Yamaha

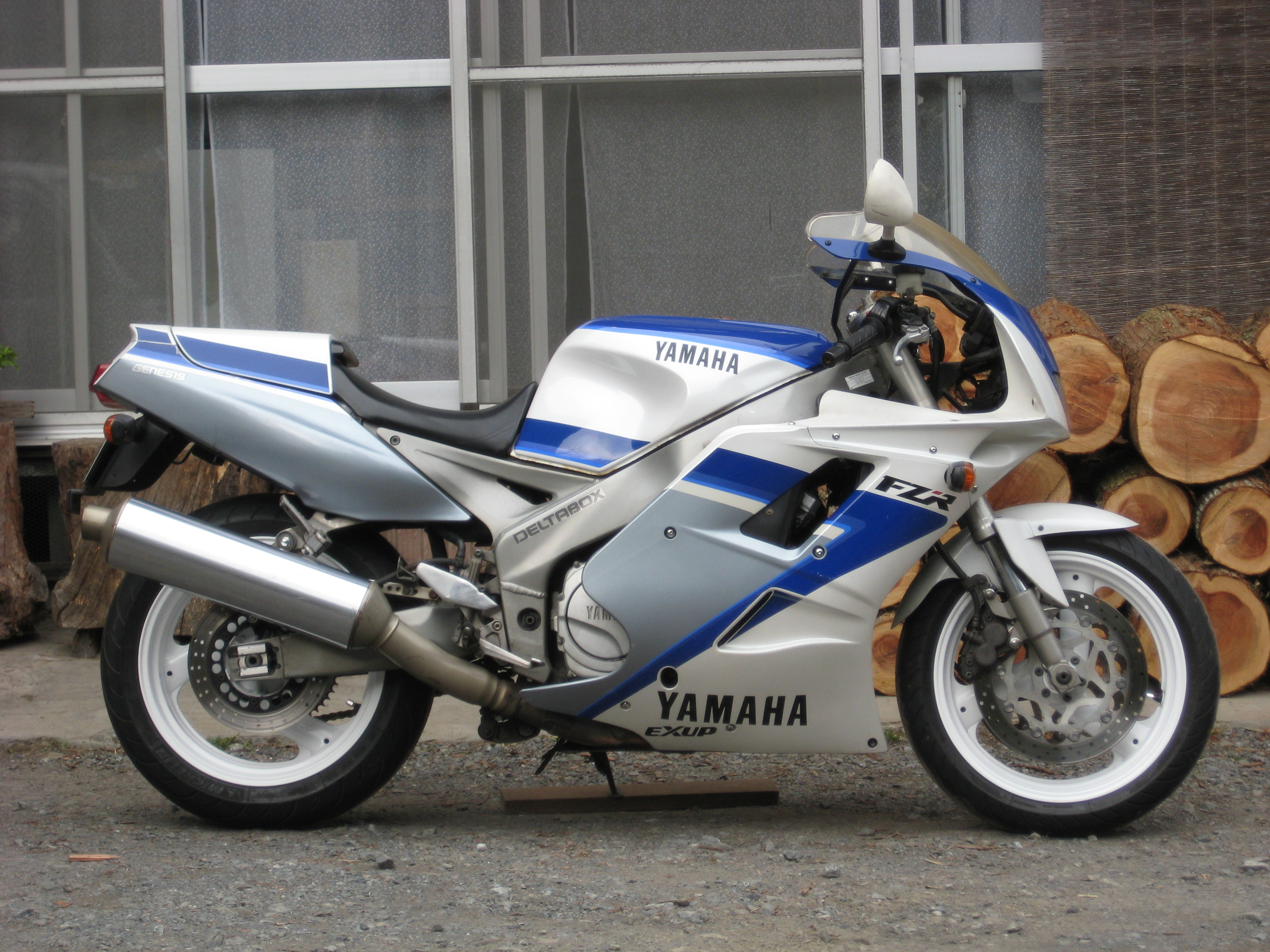
- Manufacturer: Yamaha
- Production: 1987-1995
- Predecessor: Yamaha FZ750
- Successor: YZF1000R Thunderace
- Class: Sport bike
- Engine: 1,003 cc (61.2 in^{3}) liquid-cooled inline four-cylinder. 20-valve
- Bore / stroke: 75.5 mm × 56 mm (2.97 in × 2.20 in)
- Power: 148 hp (106 kW) @ 10,000 rpm, 136 hp (99 kW) @ 10,000 rpm for 1987-1988 model
- Torque: 78.8 ft·lbf (106.9 N·m) @ 8,500 rpm
- Transmission: Close-ratio 5-speed constant-mesh sequential manual, chain-drive
- Rake, trail: 26.7°, 110 mm (4.3 in)
- Wheelbase: 1,460 mm (57 in)
- Seat height: 770 mm (30.3 in)
- Weight: 209 kg (461 lb) (dry); 236 kg (520 lb) (wet)
- Fuel capacity: 19 L (4.2 imp gal; 5.0 US gal); Reserve fuel capacity of 3.5 L (0.77 imp gal; 0.92 US gal)

The Yamaha FZR1000 is a motorcycle produced by Yamaha from 1987 to 1995. Classed as a sports motorcycle.

The FZR1000 was generally regarded as the world's finest production sports motorcycle at the time, and in its 1989 FZR1000R incarnation, the engine produced over 140 hp with class-leading handling to match. The FZR1000R won bike of year across the motorcycle press and was crowned the "Bike of the Decade" by Cycle World. It was continually updated throughout its lifetime and continued to collect awards through the early 1990s.

== Development ==
The FZR1000 was a natural development for Yamaha's Genesis design concept pioneered with the Yamaha FZ750. The major feature update was in a new aluminum perimeter type frame, marketed as the 'Deltabox'. The frame was still in their early stages technologically, and although there was experience in using aluminum Deltabox frames on race machines, this would be its first application on such a large production road-going machine. Additionally a new wheel design with lightweight hollow spokes that were wide enough to take the latest radial tyres was fitted.

The FZR1000 Genesis was presented to the public at the Cologne IFMA motorcycle show in Germany in September 1986 and went out of production following the 1994 introduction and sales success of the latest generation of SuperSport motorcycles, led by the 1992 introduction of the Honda Fireblade.

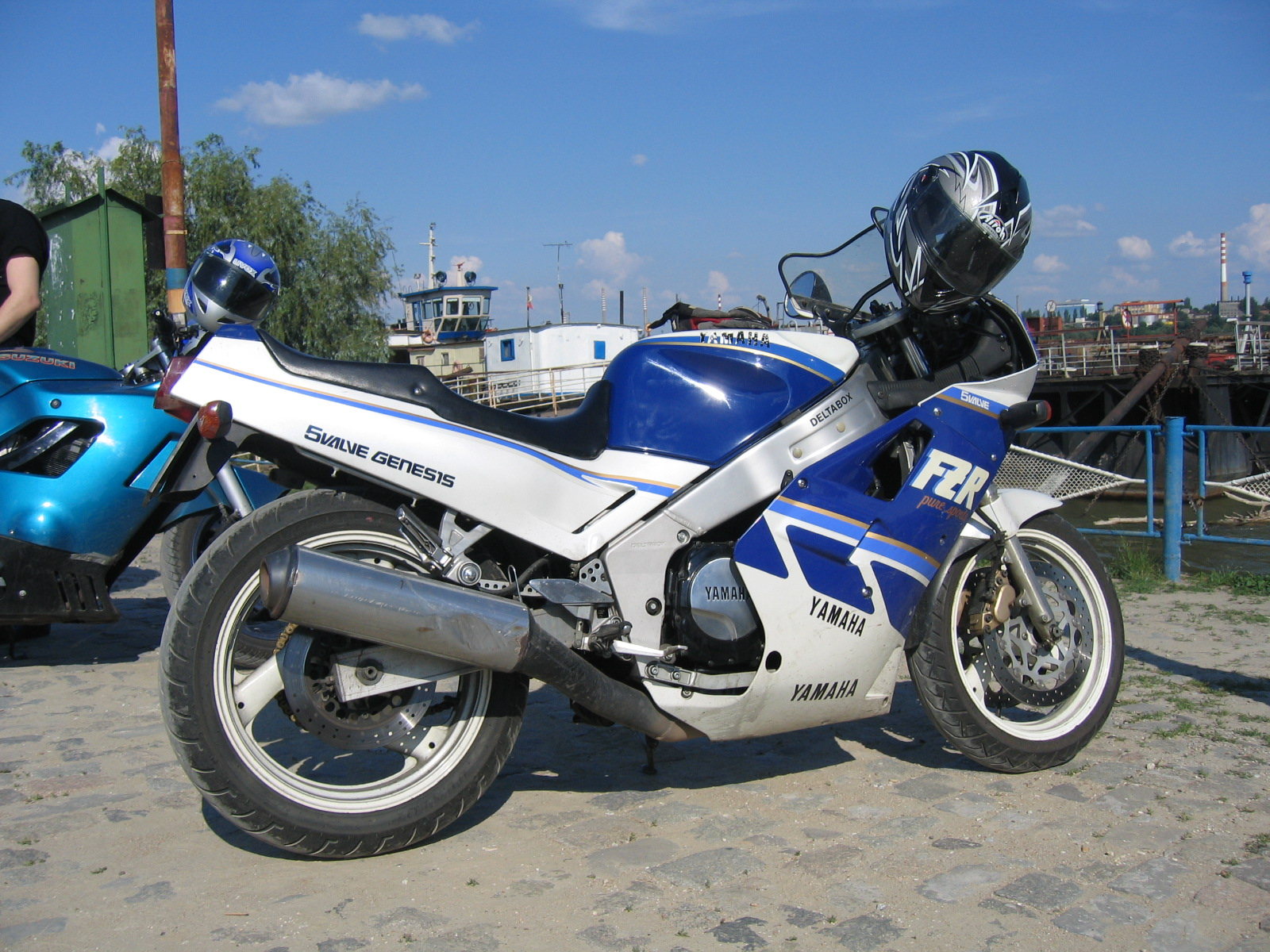
1987 Yamaha FZR1000 Genesis

== Design ==
=== Engine ===
The FZR1000 engine was developed from similar smaller cc motors of that time like Yamaha FZ750 with the same liquid-cooled 5 valve per cylinder (3 intake and 2 exhaust) engine layout with 45° inclined cylinder block. While somewhat superficially similar to the outgoing FZ750 unit, this 989cc engine was an entirely new design, including larger diameter valves and correspondingly larger 37mm BDB Mikuni CV carburetors. The lubrication system was enhanced with a dual rotor oil pump and external oil cooler.

In 1989 the machine received a major redesign, top to bottom, notably resulting in a marginal increase in capacity, rising from 989cc to 1002cc. Further, the cylinder block angle was reduced to 35°, thereby effecting a nominal reduction in wheelbase. The intake system was upgraded commensurate with these changes to include larger 38mm carburetors, as well as matching oversized intake and exhaust ports.

A unique feature that gave the new EXUP model its commonly used name was Yamaha's four-stroke power valve system EXUP valve, a servo-motor-driven exhaust valve. This allowed large bore exhaust for improved gas flow at high engine speeds but with good low engine speed performance thanks the engine speed controlled exhaust valve restricting flow at lower revs. The new EXUP machine gave class leading pulling power from low revs, seamlessly, up to the red line at 11,500 rpm. It also allowed extremely radical high lift cams that gave a very lumpy idle when unplugged in the open position or when using a full aftermarket exhaust. Yamaha continued to use the EXUP valve system on the subsequent Yamaha YZF1000R Thunderace and Yamaha YZF-R1 motorcycles.

=== Transmission ===
The FZ1000 uses a five-speed sequential close ratio gearbox. The clutch is of the wet, multi-plate type and is hydraulically operated. Final drive is by O-ring chain and sprockets.

=== Chassis ===
The FZR1000 chassis provided the biggest advancement over the original Yamaha FZ750. A major reduction of frame weight resulted from the use of an all aluminum square section 'Deltabox' perimeter type frame. The frame consisted of cast and extruded sections, welded together and provided a large weight reduction, in region of a 40% over the equivalent steel frame.. Although first seen on Yamaha racing machines such as the FZ750 OU74 race machine and in use on other smaller capacity or racing motorcycles, this was the first use on such a large production motorcycle. Aluminum perimeter frames are now common amongst contemporary sports motorcycles. The new frame was complemented by large 41mm diameter Telescopic forks, cast aluminum hollow spoke wheels suitable for radial tyres.

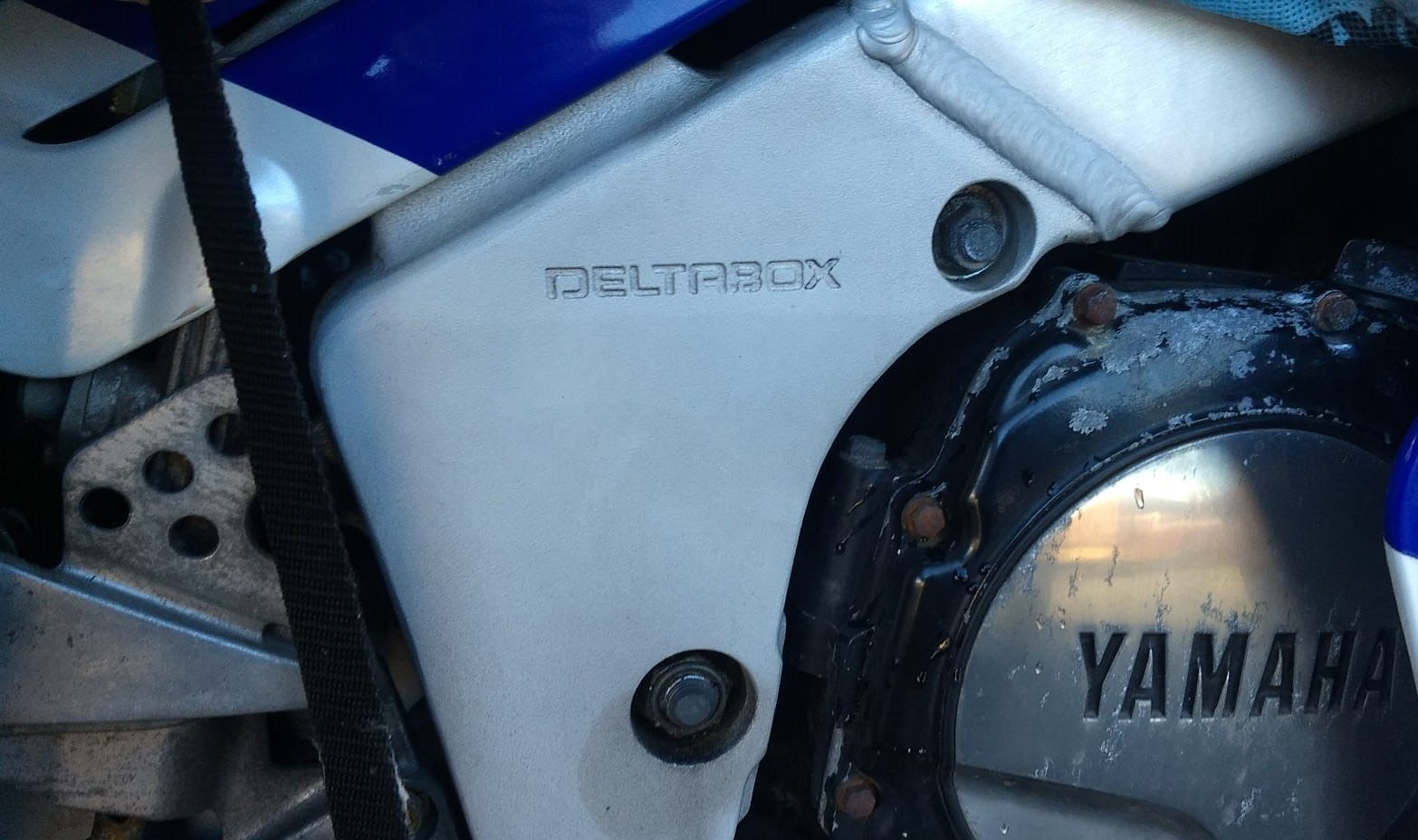
FZR1000 Genesis Frame

The 1989 redesign that resulted in the 'EXUP' bikes, provided a major refinement of the Deltabox frame, the more compact engine allowed a completely redesigned and smaller frame and along with the new 17" rear wheel and 43mm Telescopic forks. The machine was thus shorter, lower, stiffer and lighter than the previous model. The bodywork was also redesigned resulting in an almost new machine.

In 1991 a further redesign resulted in the release of the FZR1000RU EXUP, upside-down telescopic forks were fitted and the front fairing was fitted with a single headlight, generally regarded to be the definitive FZR1000. By 1994 the machine reverted to twin headlights, although now 'Fox Eye' styled, braking however was improved with the fitment of six piston front brake calipers.

== Motorsport ==
The 1000cc engine excluded the bike from the then popular Superbike racing class which limited four cylinder machines to 750cc, the bike was popular in open class racing in the hands of private teams.

The bike won the Castrol Six Hour and Isle of Man TT Production class B in 1987 and the Castrol Six Hour (New Zealand) in 1987 and 1988.

== See also ==
- List of Yamaha motorcycles
- Jimenez Novia, a one-off French supercar of 1995, using four FZR1000 engines on a common crankcase.
