= Four-stroke power valve system =

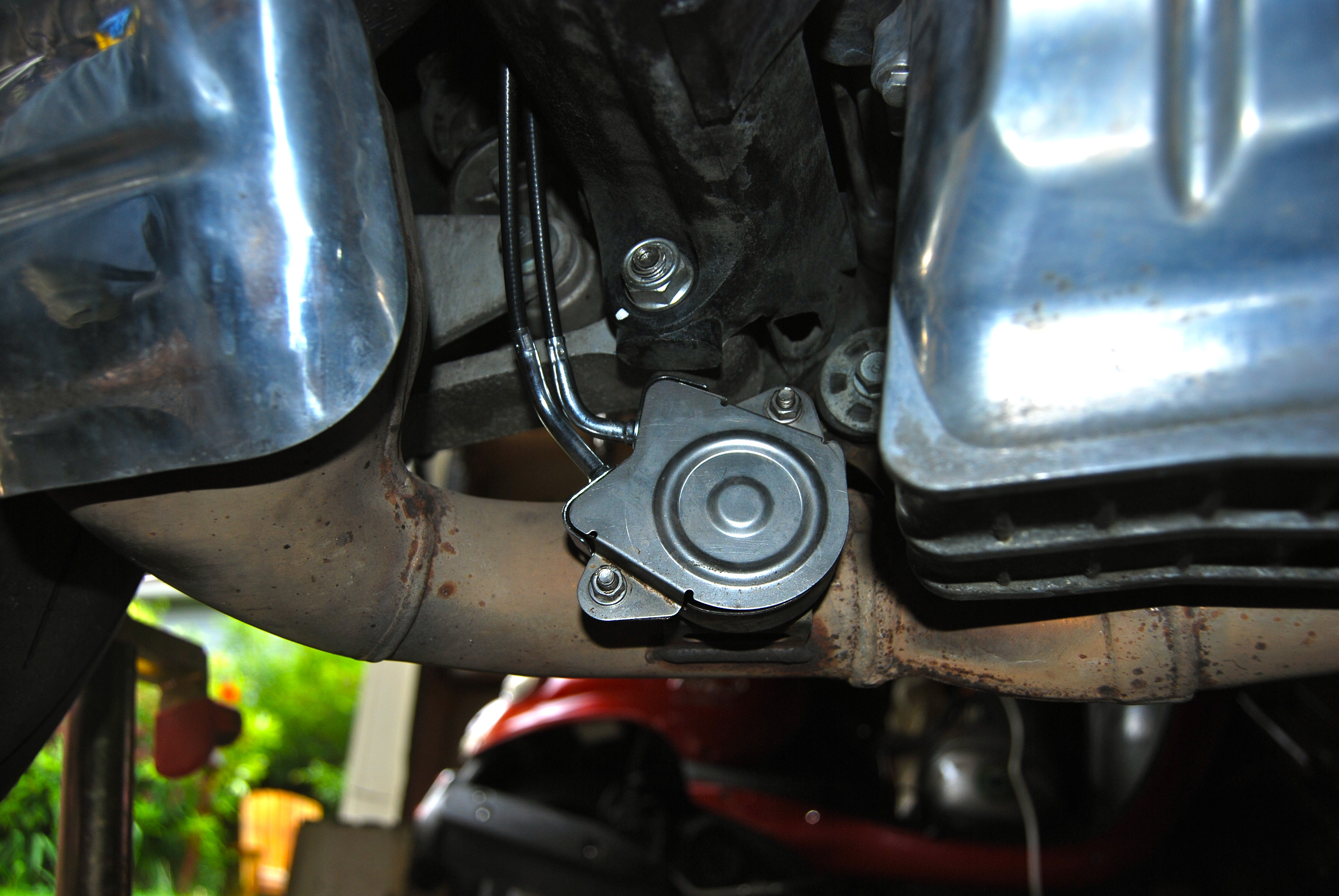
The exhaust power valve of a 2007 Honda CBR600RR.

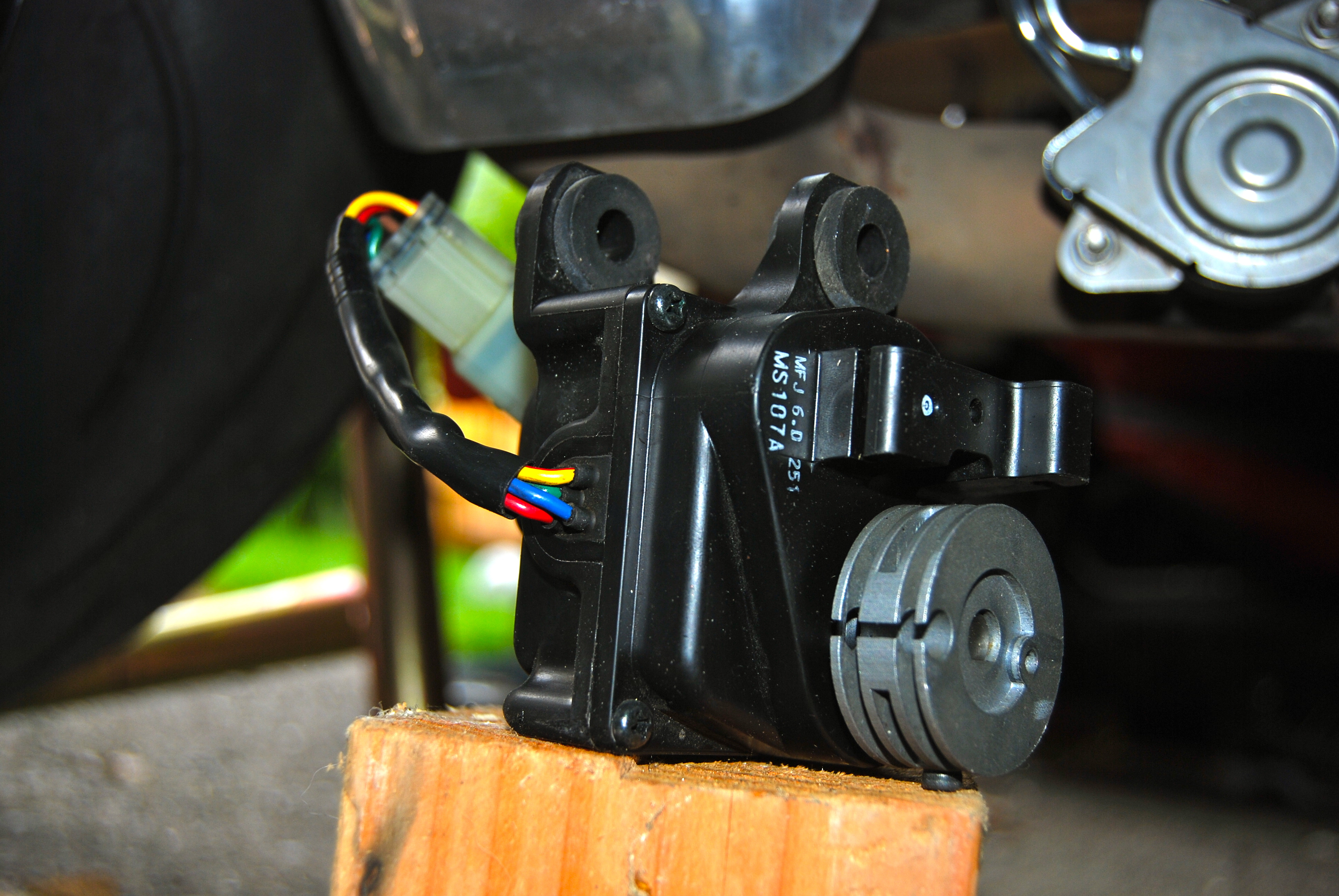
The servo motor controls the valve via two cables. Shown removed.

A four-stroke power valve is a device fitted to four-stroke engines that constantly adjusts the internal diameter of the exhaust system to better suit the speed of the engine. Yamaha was the first to develop such a system, called the Exhaust Ultimate Power Valve (EXUP). It first appeared on the Yamaha FZR EXUP and was later used on many other Yamahas.

Later versions from Honda went by the names Honda Titanium Exhaust Valve (HTEV) and Honda Variable Intake/Exhaust (H-VIX), appearing on the CBR600RR, Honda CBR929RR and Honda CBR954RR. Suzuki's version is called Suzuki Exhaust Tuning (SET). The system is also used on the Triumph Daytona 675 triple.

== Operation ==
At low engine speeds, the wave pressure within the pipe network is low. A full oscillation of the Helmholtz resonance occurs before the exhaust valve is closed, and to increase low-speed torque, large-amplitude exhaust pressure waves are artificially induced. This is done by partial closing of an internal butterfly valve within the exhaust where the primary pipes from the cylinders join. The alteration of the pressure at this point controls the behavior of reflected waves at this sudden increase in area discontinuity. Closing the valve increases the local pressure, inducing the formation of larger-amplitude negative reflected expansion waves. A servo motor controlled by the ECU opens and shuts the valve. The valve goes from being almost fully closed at idle speed, through to fully open at higher engine speeds. This ensures low to mid-range performance, more linear power output and reduced exhaust noise levels while the valve is in its reduced opening position.

== See also ==
- Exhaust manifold
- Kadenacy effect
