= Hiscock =

Hiscock is a surname. Notable people with the surname include:

- Dave Hiscock (born 1953), New Zealand motorcycle racer
- Eileen Hiscock (1909–1958), British athlete
- Ernest Hiscock (1868–1895), Australian cricketer
- Eric Hiscock (1908–1986), British sailor and author alongside Susan Hiscock
- Eugene Hiscock (born 1950), Canadian politician
- George Hiscock (1874–1962), English bowls player
- Ira V. Hiscock (1892–1986), American bacteriologist
- Jack Hiscock (1924–2007), Australian rules footballer
- Jean Hiscock (born 1939), British sprinter and Olympian
- Joe Hiscock (1904–1986), British trade union official
- Jonathan Hiscock (born 1974), British hedge fund manager
- L. Harris Hiscock (1824–1867), American attorney and politician
- Neville Hiscock (1951–1983), New Zealand motorcycle racer
- Norm Hiscock, Canadian screenwriter, producer, and director
- Peter Hiscock (born 1957), Australian archaeologist
- Susan Hiscock (1913–1995), British sailor alongside Eric Hiscock
- Thomas Hiscock (1812–1855), English blacksmith and prospector
- William Hiscock (1886–1942), British naval officer

== Disambiguation pages ==
- Frank Hiscock (disambiguation)

== See also ==
- Hiscocks
- Hiscock's Point, abandoned community in Newfoundland and Labrador, Canada
- Hiscock Site, archaeological dig site in Byron, New York, United States
- Barnes-Hiscock House, historic building in Syracus, New York, United States
- Oxley v Hiscock [2004], English land law and family law case
