= Hiscocks =

Hiscocks is a surname. Notable people with this surname include:

- Fred Hiscocks (1879–?), Australian-born cartoonist in New Zealand and England
- Richard Hiscocks (1914–1996), Canadian aviation engineer
- Simon Hiscocks (born 1973), British sailor and Olympian
- Steve Hiscocks (died 2010), British philatelist and civil servant

== See also ==
- Hiscock
