= Yamaha XV1000 SE Midnight Special =

Yamaha XV1000 SE
- Manufacturer: Yamaha
- Also called: Midnight Special
- Production: 1983–1985
- Class: Custom Cruiser
- Engine: 981 cc (59.9 cu in) air-cooled OHC 75° V-twin 4-stroke
- Bore / stroke: {3.7 x 2.7 inches (95.0 x 69.2 mm)
- Compression ratio: 8.3:1
- Power: 68.00 hp (49.6 kW) @ 6500 rpm
- Transmission: 5 speed, Cardan shaft
- Frame type: Pressed steel
- Suspension: Front: 38 mm (1.5 in) telescopic forks, 150 mm (5.9 in) travel Rear: Single swing arm
- Brakes: Front: Double disc. Rear: Drum
- Tires: Front: 3.50-19 Rear: 130/90-16
- Rake, trail: 32°, 129 mm (5.1 in)
- Wheelbase: 1,525 mm (60.0 in)
- Dimensions: L: 2,285 mm (90.0 in); W: 840 mm (33 in)
- Seat height: 715 mm (28.1 in)
- Weight: 236 kg (520 lb) (wet)
- Fuel capacity: 14.5 L (3.2 imp gal; 3.8 U.S. gal)
- Related: XV750, XV920, XV1100

The Yamaha XV1000 SE or Midnight Special is a special edition Yamaha V-twin cruiser motorcycle. The XV920 was made from 1983 to 1985 and was based on Yamaha's Virago line of V-twin cruisers that are part of Yamaha's XV generation first launched in 1981. The top speed of SV1000 SE is 172.0 km/h (106.9 mph) with a maximum acceleration is 0–100 km/h in 5.3 seconds (0-60 mph 5.1 seconds).

== See also ==
- Yamaha XV920
- Yamaha XV1100
