= Yamaha XV700 =

Yamaha Virago 700 (XV700)
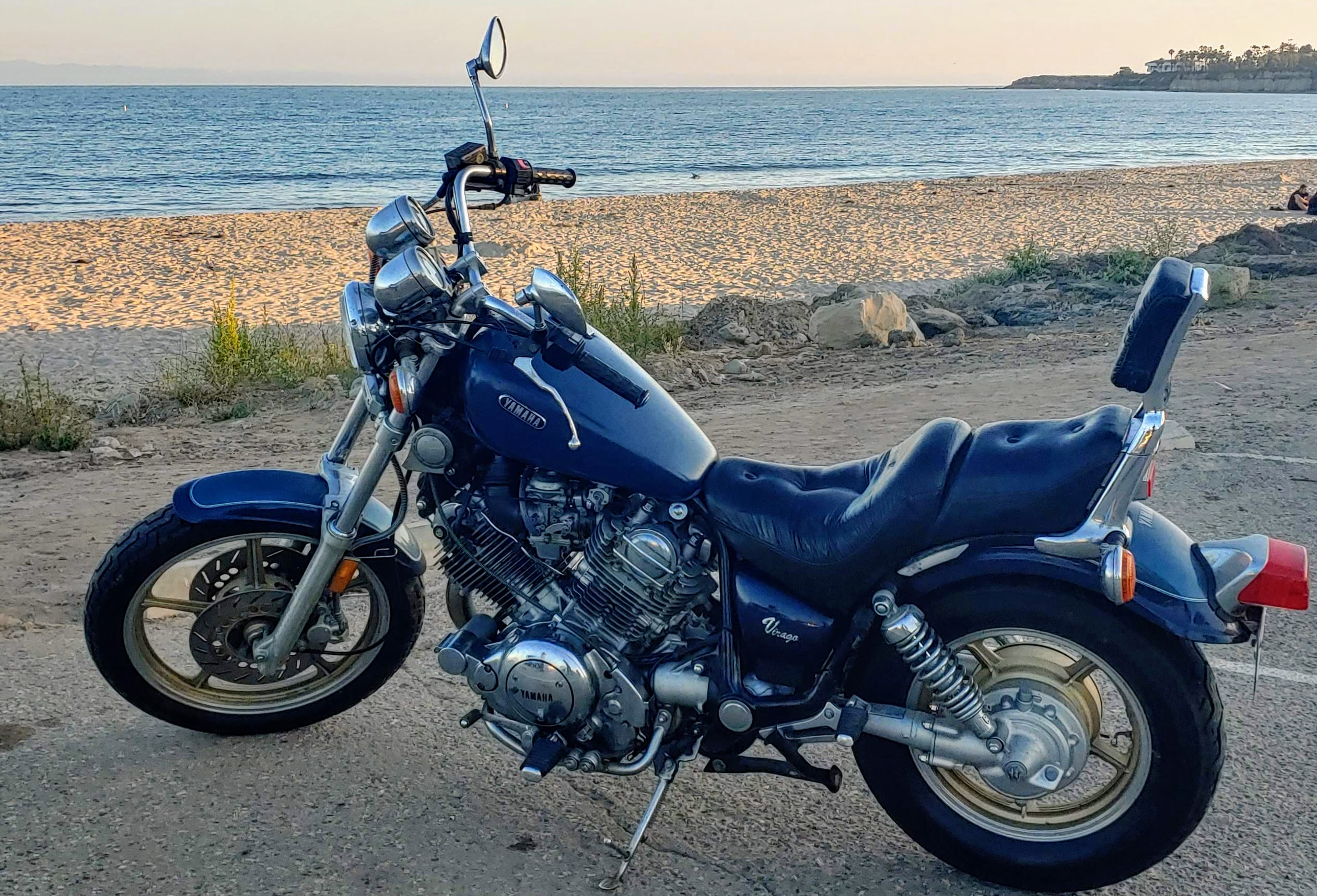
- Manufacturer: Yamaha
- Also called: Virago
- Production: 1984–1987
- Predecessor: Yamaha XV750
- Successor: Yamaha XV750
- Class: Cruiser
- Engine: 699 cc (42.7 cu in) air-cooled OHC 75° V-twin
- Bore / stroke: 80.2 mm × 69.2 mm (3.16 in × 2.72 in)
- Compression ratio: 9.0:1
- Transmission: 5 speed, shaft drive
- Frame type: Pressed steel backbone using engine as stressed member
- Suspension: Front: 38 mm (1.5 in) telescopic forks, 150 mm (5.9 in) travel Rear: Double sided swingarm with twin KYB shocks. 97 mm (3.8 in) travel (1984-1985), 70 mm (2.8 in) travel (1986-1987)
- Brakes: Front: 2, 2-piston calipers, 300 mm (11.7 in) disc Rear: 200 mm (7.9 in) drum brake
- Tires: Front: 100/90-19 57H Rear: 140/90-15 70H
- Rake, trail: 32°, 129 mm (5.1 in), 129 mm (5.1 in)
- Wheelbase: 1,525 mm (60.0 in)
- Dimensions: L: 2,285 mm (90.0 in); W: 840 mm (33 in)
- Seat height: 715 mm (28.1 in)
- Weight: 225 kg (496 lb) (1984-1985), 229 kg (505 lb) (1986-1987) (wet)
- Fuel capacity: 12.5 L (2.7 imp gal; 3.3 U.S. gal) (1984-1985), 14.7 L (3.2 imp gal; 3.9 U.S. gal) (1986-1987)
- Related: XV750, XV1100

The Yamaha XV700 or Virago 700 was a Yamaha V-twin cruiser motorcycle. Made from 1984 to 1987, it was part of Yamaha's Virago line of cruisers. It was informally known as Yamaha's "tariff buster" of the US's 1983 tariff on imported motorcycles with over 700 cc of displacement. When the tariff ended in 1988, Yamaha switched back to the XV750.

== See also ==
- Yamaha XV1100
