= Yamaha XV1000 =

Yamaha Virago 1000 (XV1000)
- Manufacturer: Yamaha
- Also called: Virago
- Production: 1984–1985
- Predecessor: Yamaha XV920
- Successor: Yamaha XV1100
- Class: Cruiser
- Engine: 984 cc (60.0 cu in) air-cooled OHC 75° V-twin
- Bore / stroke: 95 mm × 69.2 mm (3.74 in × 2.72 in)
- Compression ratio: 8.3:1
- Transmission: 5 speed, shaft drive
- Suspension: Front: 38 mm (1.5 in) telescopic forks, 150 mm (5.9 in) travel Rear: Double sided swingarm with twin KYB shocks. 97 mm (3.8 in) travel
- Tires: Front: 100/90-19 57H Rear: 140/90-15 70H
- Rake, trail: 32°, 129 mm (5.1 in)
- Wheelbase: 1,525 mm (60.0 in)
- Dimensions: L: 2,285 mm (90.0 in); W: 840 mm (33 in)
- Seat height: 715 mm (28.1 in)
- Weight: 236 kg (520 lb) (wet)
- Fuel capacity: 14.5 L (3.2 imp gal; 3.8 U.S. gal)
- Related: XV750, XV920, XV1000 SE

The Yamaha XV1000 or Virago 1000 was a Yamaha V-twin cruiser motorcycle. The XV920 was redesigned in 1984 and engine size increased to 981 cc (59.9 cu in) resulting in the renamed XV1000. Made from 1984 through 1985, it was part of Yamaha's Virago line of cruisers. In 1986, engine size was again increased to 1,063 cc (64.9 cu in), resulting in the renamed XV1100.

== See also ==
- Yamaha XV920
- Yamaha XV1100
