= Yamaha XV535 =

Yamaha cruiser motorcycle

Yamaha Virago 535
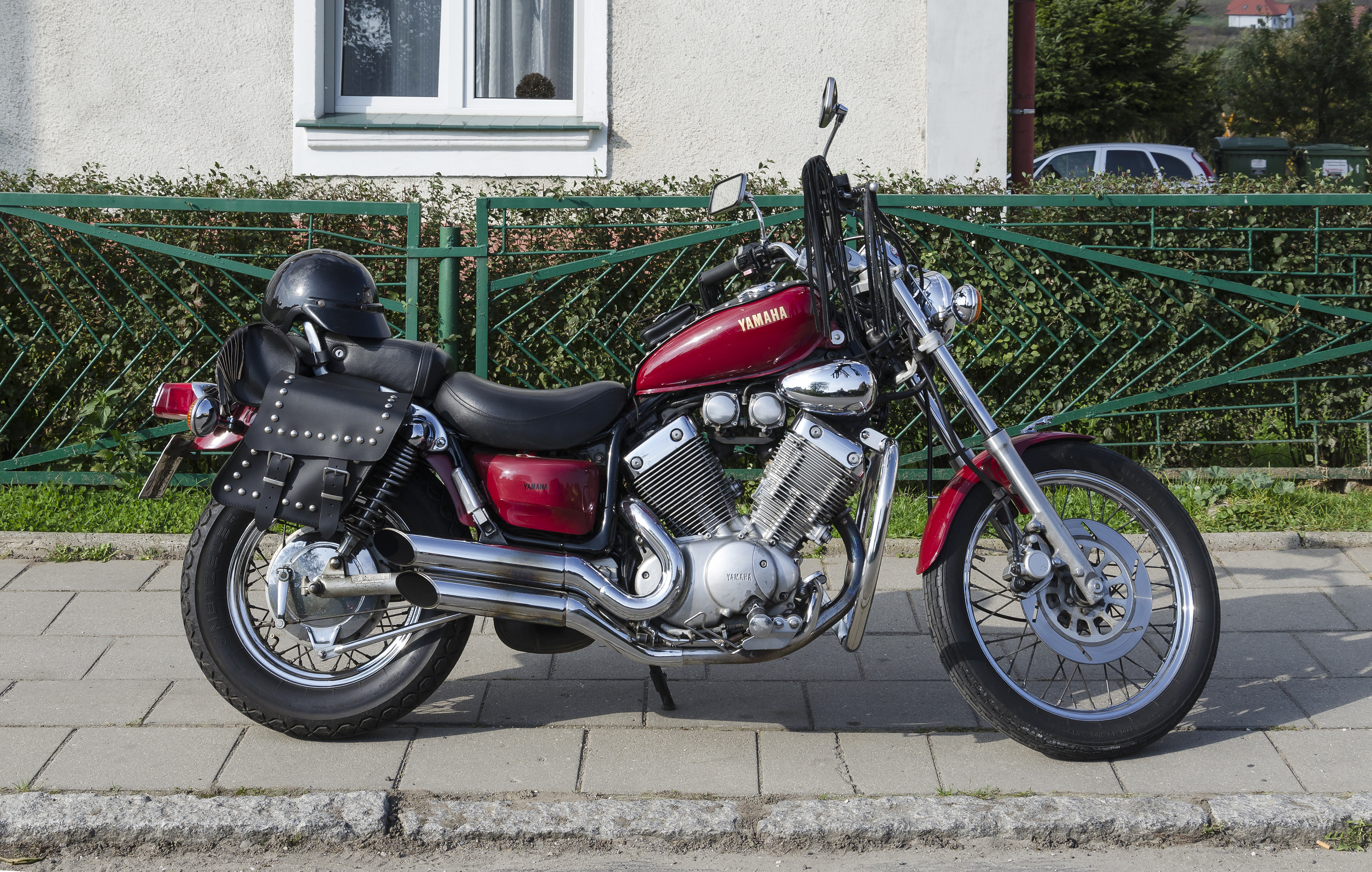
- Manufacturer: Yamaha
- Also called: XV535
- Production: 1987–2003
- Predecessor: Yamaha Virago 500K
- Successor: Yamaha DragStar 650 XVS650/XVS650A
- Class: Cruiser
- Engine: Air-cooled 4-stroke 70° SOHC V-twin 535 cc (32.6 cu in). Bore x stroke 76 x 59 mm. 9.0:1 compression.
- Power: 31.1 kW
- Transmission: Wet-clutch; 5 Speed constant mesh; shaft drive
- Suspension: Front: Telescopic fork Rear: Twin shocks with concentric coil springs
- Brakes: Front: Single drilled disc with hydraulic caliper Rear: Cable-actuated drum
- Tires: Front: 3.00S-19 4PR; Rear: 140/90-15M/C 70S
- Fuel capacity: 1987–1988: 8.6 L (2.3 US gal); 1989–2003: 13.5 L (3.6 US gal)
- Oil capacity: 2.8 L (3.0 US qt)

The Yamaha Virago 535 is a motorcycle manufactured by Yamaha Motor Corporation. It is one of several in the Virago line and is positioned as mid-size cruiser with an engine displacement of 535 cc (32.6 cu in).

It is unique in being one of the few smaller cruiser-style motorcycles available with a shaft drive instead of a chain or belt final drive system, as well as a V-twin engine of that size. Its heavily chromed body styling is also distinctive.

This model was discontinued in 2004 in the US and 2003 and replaced by the V-Star 650 (known as the DragStar in Europe). I

== Specifications ==
=== 1987–1988 US models ===
1987-92 XV535 (US)
- Production: 1987—1988
- Wheelbase: 1,511 mm (59.5 in)
- Dimensions: L: 2,210 mm (87 in); W: 815 mm (32.1 in); H: 1,100 mm (43 in)
- Seat height: 700 mm (28 in)
- Weight: n/a (dry); 185 kg (408 lb) (186 kg (410 lb) California model) (wet)

First and only year with the fuel tank under the seat, as the only fuel storage. The "fuel tank" on top, in front of the driver, was a dummy containing electric equipment only. This limited its range considerably.

=== 1988 UK model ===
1988 XV535 (UK)
- Production: 1988
- Wheelbase: 1,520 mm (60 in)
- Dimensions: L: 2,225 mm (87.6 in); W: 810 mm (32 in); H: 1,100 mm (43 in)
- Seat height: 700 mm (28 in)
- Weight: n/a (dry); 188 kg (414 lb) (wet)

=== 1988–1994 US models ===
1988–1994 XV535 (US)
- Production: 1988–1994
- Wheelbase: 1,520 mm (60 in)
- Dimensions: L: 2,225 mm (87.6 in); W: 810 mm (32 in); H: 1,110 mm (44 in)
- Seat height: 720 mm (28 in)
- Weight: n/a (dry); 195 kg (430 lb) (196 kg (432 lb) California model) (wet)

=== 1989–1994 UK models ===
1989–1994 XV535 (UK)
- Production: 1989–1994
- Wheelbase: 1,520 mm (60 in)
- Dimensions: L: 2,285 mm (90.0 in); W: Flat handlebar: 725 mm (28.5 in); Upright handlebar: 810 mm (32 in); H: Flat handlebar: 1,070 mm (42 in); Upright handlebar 1,110 mm (44 in)
- Seat height: 720 mm (28 in)
- Weight: n/a (dry); 195 kg (430 lb) (wet)

== See also ==
- Yamaha Virago
- Yamaha Virago 750
- Yamaha Virago 1100
- Yamaha DragStar 650 XVS550/XVS650A
- Yamaha DragStar 1100 XVS1100

== Bibliography ==
- Ahlstrand, Alan; Haynes, John Harold (1994), Yamaha XV V-Twins (XV535, 700, 750, 920, 1000 & 1100 Viragos; 1981 to 1994). Owners Workshop Manual, Newbury Park, California: Haynes North America, ISBN 1-56392-103-0
- Ed, Scott (2004), Yamaha XV535-1100 Virago, 1981-2003, Service, Repair, Maintenance, Overland Park, Kansas: Primedia Business Magazines & Media Inc., ISBN 0-89287-907-6
