= Stokes Valley =

Suburb of Lower Hutt, New Zealand

- Suburb
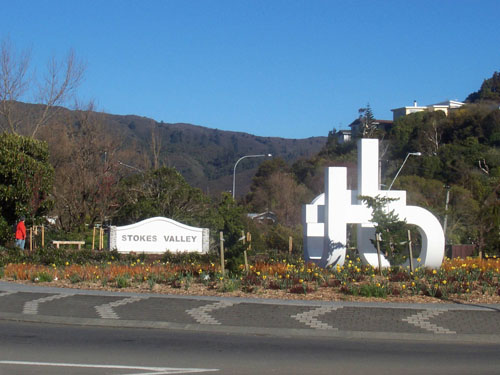
- The entrance to Stokes Valley, with the large sculpture Mating Worms by Stokes Valley resident Guy Ngan in the foreground. To the right side are houses in Holborn, which is part of Stokes Valley. In the distance are bush-clad hills at the top end of the valley.
- Interactive map of Stokes Valley
- Coordinates: 41°10′S 174°59′E
- Country: New Zealand
- City: Lower Hutt
- Local authority: Hutt City Council
- Electoral ward: Northern
- Established: 1840–1843, settled in 1853

Area
  - Land: 967 ha (2,390 acres)

Population (June 2025)
  - Total: 10,790
  - Density: 1,120/km^{2} (2,890/sq mi)

	Manor Park	Pinehaven
Pomare	Stokes Valley	Blue Mountains
Taitā

Stokes Valley, a major suburb of the city of Lower Hutt in the North Island of New Zealand, lies at the edge of the city, seven kilometres northeast of the city centre. It occupies the valley of a small tributary of the Hutt River, called Stokes Valley Stream, which flows north to meet the main river close to the Taitā Gorge. Stokes Valley takes its name from Robert Stokes, who formed part of the original survey team of 1840 commissioned to plan the city at Thorndon in Wellington.

Stokes Valley comprises a suburb in its own valley, physically separated from the rest of Lower Hutt. It is surrounded on all sides by densely forested hills.

== Geology and early history ==
It has been suggested that the valley was formed during the ice age 10,000–20,000 years ago by glacial scouring, but considering that the Hutt Valley and the greater Wellington area have experienced major tectonic uplifting it is possible that the valley was formed through major earthquakes and erosion.

According to tradition, Māori arrived in the Hutt Valley in about 1250 AD when the two sons of Whatonga, a Hawke's Bay chief, settled in the area and named the Hutt River Heretaunga, after their old home. Although Māori had lived in the Hutt Valley for almost 600 years prior to Europeans, there has been no evidence of Māori habitation in Stokes Valley and the closest iwi (tribe), located at Waiwhetū, say they never used the valley for any significant purpose before Europeans arrived. Stokes Valley was located at the junction of the claimed territory of three major Māori tribes, the Te Āti Awa who sold it to European settlers, Ngāti Toa, and the Ngāti Kahungunu, and for this reason it would have in all likelihood never have been inhabited. This partially explains an extreme willingness to include this land in the sale to the early settlers.

== Modern history ==
The modern history of the area, as far as European settlement is concerned, began on 21 September 1839, when local Te Āti Awa chief Te Puni gestured with his arms and pointed finger the areas of the Hutt Valley and Wellington, that he was willing to sell to the New Zealand Land Company through its agent Colonel William Wakefield aboard the ship Tory. Stokes Valley, which at that time was simply an unnamed branch valley of the Hutt Valley, was included in this land.

The second of the New Zealand Company's ships to arrive in Wellington was the 273-ton Cuba on 3 January 1840. It had on board 20 able-bodied men aged from 20 to 27. Among these was the Company's surveying party, whose duty was to plan the city at Thorndon and survey the site in readiness for the arrival of the emigrants who already procured sections in London. The first emigrant ship, containing 85 adult settlers and their 42 children, arrived only 17 days later. At this stage there was no sections or shelters surveyed for most of the people, and many had to live in huts built by the Māori, or simply shelter under karaka trees. The Wellington and Hutt Valley area was hurriedly surveyed.

The original survey party that arrived in 1840 on the Cuba comprised Captain William Mein Smith (Surveyor General) and Messrs. R. D. Hanson, W. Carrington, R. Park, R. Stokes, and K. Bethune, all well known personalities in the early history of Wellington. Robert Stokes, after whom the valley was named, was initially active surveying a 'valley east of the valley of the Hutt' from 30 March to 2 April 1841, resuming the following 14 October for a few more days, highly probably referring to the area first named as Stokes Valley in a plan of January 1843. Stokes left the employ of the New Zealand Company in early 1842 and went into business for himself. Stokes Street in Wellington was named in his honour in the 1841 map of Wellington.

Robert Stokes took a prominent part in Wellington affairs, including government. He published a work in 1844 on the Wairau Affray, led the first European crossing of the Rimutaka range to the Wairarapa, built a once-famous house in Wellington, "Saint Ruadhan", on Woolcombe Street (since demolished; the site now forms part of The Terrace). He was a keen gardener, known for his prize-winning vegetables and flowers, and was also a keen botanist, and was treasurer of the Horticultural and Botanical Society. He became a publisher and printer, his name appearing on The New Zealand Spectator and Cook's Strait Guardian as a printer He was a prominent speaker, and was instrumental in carrying a Bill to establish a municipal corporation for Wellington and a railway link to the Wairarapa. Stokes stood as an elected member of the Wairarapa Council in 1867, and was a Member of the Victoria University of Wellington Senate from 1871 to 1878. Stokes died at Clanricarde Gardens, London, on 20 January 1880.

=== Crown Grants ===
The first Crown Land Grants in Stokes Valley were made from 18 January 1853. Section 74 was granted to Robert Henry Wood and Section 73 to George Hart. Wood never settled in the valley, even though he received another land grant of section 67. There is no known evidence that he ever left England, and it was common to have absentee ownership of Crown grants in those days, but it is known that he served on the Committee of the First Colony formed in London. Hart who was born in London, also never settled in the valley, but he did leave England after receiving the land grant, arriving on the ship Mary in 1843. In 1863 he was appointed Commissioner of Thorndon for the Thorndon Ward of the Wellington Town Board. The first person to actually settle in Stokes Valley after the making of Crown Grants was Mr. Hart Udy who immediately set up a saw mill on his property at the entrance to the Valley on the north East side of the main road. His property was plot or Section 65 of the original Crown land grant.

=== Early settlement ===
Mr. William Judd Sr. was known as the first resident of Stokes Valley. Judd arrived at Port Nicholson on the ship Martha Ridgway in July 1840 along with his wife Anne and their sons John, George, and Stephen. The Judds initially lived at Lower Hutt after arriving, but after the birth of his fourth son and upon securing a contract to make a road through the Taitā Gorge, Judd moved with his family to the entrance of Stokes Valley. He constructed a home on a leasehold title on the southern side of the present Stokes Valley main road. The exact date of his move to the valley is unknown, but his name is listed in the "Memorial of the Settlers of Wellington and the Neighbouring Districts..." published in the local newspaper of the time in April 1852. His house was recorded as severely damaged in the earthquake of 23 February 1855 and he most likely lived in the valley for several years before 1852. It was in this house that the last three members of his family were born. This possibly puts his settlement in the valley in the late 1840s.

George Spackman (a contender for first settler) was also known to reside in Stokes Valley as early as 3 April 1852 and is listed beside Mr Judd in the "Memorial of the Settlers...". Spackman is listed on the 1854 Electoral Roll as a settler residing on a leasehold in Stokes Valley, Spackman arrived with his wife on the ship Bolton on 21 April 1840, and a son was born to them three months later. George Spackman paraded with the "Old Identities" who attended the capital's Jubilee of Colonisation in 1890.

Mr. Hart Udy, after whom Udy Street in Petone is named, was born in Cornwall in 1808. In 1839 he left England for New Zealand with his wife and family on the New Zealand Company's ship Duke of Roxburgh, arriving in Petone in February 1840. Hart worked for Sir Francis Molesworth on the building of the first cutter and house to be built from New Zealand timber. After working for three years in Wellington as a shipwright at the stream near Staples Brewery he moved to Waiwhetū (now a suburb of Lower Hutt), where he worked as a carpenter for many years. On 1 March 1845 his house was pillaged by local Mãori. In 1849 he built the first Anglican church in Lower Hutt near the Hutt Bridge. On 24 May 1852 Mr Hart Udy by mutual consent dissolved a Saw Milling partnership which he had with William Corbett and Richard Blake that was based in Stokes Valley, so it is assumed he had worked in the valley for a significant time before then. He moved to Stokes Valley in 1853, and resided there until 1857, when he took his family to Matarawa where he had access to valuable bush-clad land. A source says that Udy set up a sawmill at the valley mouth in 1858, but it doesn't make it clear whether this was the original one he dissolved in 1852 that he reactivated or an additional one. He carried on the family sawmilling business until 1865, when he retired leaving it to his sons. Mr Hart Udy Jr., who was five years old when his parents arrived in 1840, married Elizabeth Holland of Petone in 1855, their first home being in Stokes Valley. He was also involved in his father's sawmilling business and moved with him to Matarawa. Mr Hart Jr. later became Mayor of the Borough of Greytown. Mr Hart Udy Sr died on 27 November 1890 in Greytown aged 82 from complications from a bone he had accidentally swallowed, he had 90 direct descendants, and was Justice of the peace of Greytown & greatly missed.

For a long time many made their living by felling timber, splitting posts and rails, and timber production as the valley had a large amount of native bush, including birch, rimu, rātā, tōtara, and white pine. The bush was populated with a considerable amount of wildlife, including weka, California quail, and wild pigs. Once the bush was largely cleared, it was found that the valley's soil had little to offer for farm production and for a time Stokes Valley was known as "Starvation Valley" owing to the difficult times that many of the early settlers had in making a living in the remote valley. Their problems were not helped by floods, drought and snow storms. The Hutt Valley area experienced a major flood in the 1870s which caused considerable damage to the lower portion of Stokes Valley and swept away a large amount of cut timber.

The first recorded marriages in the valley were in 1865. On 5 June Thomas Sparks was married to Mary Ann Robinson (both residents of Stokes Valley) at the Primitive Methodist Church by Rev. Waters. Two further marriages are recorded from October, with the marriage of Isaac Sykes to Maria Ann Wyeth of Upper Hutt at St James' Church at Lower Hutt on 8 October, and the marriage of Stokes Valley farmer John Walker to Mary Brown of Kapiti, at the Anglican Church in Upper Hutt, by the Rev. Mr Abrahams on 26 October.

Other early incidents in Stokes Valley include the invention and patenting of an improved milk churn, by Ignatius Singer in 1900, and two local tragedies. The first of these occurred on 10 December 1883, when an elderly woman named Hamlin was shot at by a youth. There was no shot loaded in the gun, but gunpowder lodged in her left arm above the wrist. Hamlin died during an operation to amputate the arm. Another account of this same incident claims it occurred in 1885 and that the woman was called Hamblin. According to this account the youth (Sinnox) was a friend and popped in to demonstrate his newly acquired shotgun after hunting rabbits. The gun accidentally discharged, and Mrs. Hamblin was hit in the shoulder. A doctor was summoned, but when he arrived he ordered her to be taken to hospital because of loss of blood. By the time Hamblin arrived at Wellington hospital she was unconscious through loss of blood, and she died later that night. This account makes no mention of an amputation, but goes into greater detail about the people involved.

The second local tragedy, on 1 April 1897, made headlines in newspapers around the country. Mrs. Annetta Hope was killed with her infant child, Annetta, and 20-year-old step daughter Lillian, when the horse and carriage they were riding in slipped down the Taitā (or Hutt) Gorge and into the Hutt River. Mrs. Hope had decided to meet her husband Joseph William Hope from the Silverstream railway station (now a train museum) after his work, but he did not arrive. She was halfway back to Stokes Valley at a steep part of the gorge when she saw the next train coming and made an attempt to turn the horse and carriage around to go back to meet it. It is thought that the horse took fright and as Mrs. Hope was not experienced at controlling a carriage it slipped down into the ravine. The bodies were found about one hour later, drowned in about four feet of water. The horse was none the worse for wear. The husband did not find out what had happened to her until the following Thursday when he read it in The Evening Post. It was later decided at an inquest that the road was dangerous and needed to be fenced as bicycles were frequently on the road and could frighten horses. (It is not known whether any bicycles were involved in the Hope tragedy).

=== Early 20th-century history ===
In 1927 a toll bridge was erected across the Hutt River to service the valley, but this was destroyed by a flood in 1932 and replaced by a foot bridge that was later deemed unsafe. Before 1940 the upper valley was heavily populated with holiday baches and enjoyed a resort status. During the Second World War, the United States Marine Corps established a base near the foot of the valley.

=== Natural disasters ===
==== 1855 Wellington earthquake ====
The Otago witness in 1899 recounts an interesting story of the reminiscences of one of the early inhabitants of the valley and the early characters (including the "Rev." Udy) during the "great" Wellington earthquake (presumably 1855 and not 1848). This earthquake apparently lasted a long time and was exceedingly frightful for even the most hardened soul as the story below relates:

...will never forget the big earthquake which shook hundreds of green pine trees out by the roots, split asunder rocks, tore up great rents in the ground, sent mighty slips down from mountains and hill, overturned houses and so twisted others that doors would neither open nor close, and several times threw Maoris canoeing over the Hutt River out into the waters.

The day before the disturbance, I and my brothers were at work hewing wood in the bush; the earthquake, which came in the night, had uprooted hundreds of trees all around the spot of our previous day's labour, and blocked up all the roads and tracks in the neighbourhood. Away over in Stokes's Valley there was at that time a congregation of old shellbacks and whalers, men-o'-wars men and seamen, lags and hard cases, living in tents and whares but when the earthquake was in its worst throes and they found that it had come to stay sometime this heterogeneous mass of misguided humanity assembled with one accord, and under the guidance of the Rev. Mr Udy, a gentleman of the Wesleyan persuasion, prayed in the open air, harder than ever they blasphemed night and day, for deliverance.

==== 1976 slips and flooding ====
On 20 December 1976, extremely heavy rainfall struck the Hutt Valley and Wellington. This caused hundreds of slips and widespread flooding, and Pinehaven and Stokes Valley were declared disaster zones. At 10:30 am on 20 December, a petrol station at the entrance to Stokes Valley was flooded to within 15 centimetres (6 in) of the top of the petrol pumps. Three houses in Ngahere Street were destroyed when they slipped down a hill. Five Stokes Valley residents were evacuated by a helicopter from the United States Coast Guard icebreaker Burton Island which happened to be in port at the time, and crew from the ship also helped dig out houses in Stokes Valley after the weather subsided. About 100 Hutt Valley people evacuated from their homes were given accommodation at the Epuni Boys Home.

== Alternative names and nicknames ==
Stokes Valley was often referred in print as "Stokes's Valley". Stokes Valley is sometimes referred to as Koraunui, a Māori name meaning "big ferns", which is possibly a reference to the lush bush which once covered the entire valley and which still exists in some areas, especially on the hills surrounding Stokes Valley. It is not known whether local Māori ever used this name, but the minutes of a Hutt County Council meeting in 1926–27 provide the first recorded mention of this name. The minutes record an attempt to officially change the name of the valley to Koraunui, prompted by a request to do so from the Stokes Valley Progressive Association. The new name was accepted and moves to change the name were undertaken. A petition was submitted to the Department of Internal Affairs, awaiting the Ministers objection to a change of name. It was resolved to wait for the results of a postal ballot of ratepayers concerned before proceeding. It was finally decided not to change the name, though exactly why is unclear.

In 2005 the original Stokes Valley School, established over 100 years earlier, changed its name to Koraunui School, after its merger with Kamahi School. It was decided to change the school's name as a sign of respect to Kamahi School (which closed after the merger on 28 January 2005), and because the new entity essentially became a new school, its roll approximately doubling overnight with the merger. As of 2010 the roll for Koraunui School is around 330 pupils. The name Koraunui is also used for the Koraunui Marae in Stokes Valley, the Koraunui Kindergarten in Stokes Valley Road, the Koraunui Sports Club, and the Koraunui Hall (which was a major event centre for Stokes Valley society functions, including mayoral dinners, and is used by clubs and for fundraising events).

Since the late 1990s Stokes Valley has been affectionately known by some locals (both past and present) and those living within the greater Wellington area as Snake Gully. The origin of this nickname is not known but is likely to relate to the 1940s radio series 'Dad and Dave from Snake Gully'

In common with several other New Zealand towns stereotypically seen as largely consisting of working-class people with little access to nightlife, Stokes Valley is now ironically referred to on many internet forums and discussion groups as Stokes Vegas. In keeping with this theme, the Stokes Valley Cosmopolitan Club has a gambling casino called "Stokes Vegas Gaming Room"

== Demographics ==
Stokes Valley, comprising the statistical areas of Stokes Valley Central, Stokes Valley North, Delaney and Manuka, covers 9.67 km^{2} (3.73 sq mi). It had an estimated population of 10,790 as of June 2025, with a population density of 1,116 people per km^{2}.

Historical population
Year	Pop.	±% p.a.
2006	9,228	—
2013	9,531	+0.46%
2018	9,879	+0.72%
2023	10,194	+0.63%

Stokes Valley had a population of 10,194 in the 2023 New Zealand census, an increase of 315 people (3.2%) since the 2018 census, and an increase of 663 people (7.0%) since the 2013 census. There were 5,109 males, 5,034 females, and 54 people of other genders in 3,537 dwellings. 4.0% of people identified as LGBTIQ+. The median age was 35.2 years (compared with 38.1 years nationally). There were 2,088 people (20.5%) aged under 15 years, 2,028 (19.9%) aged 15 to 29, 4,815 (47.2%) aged 30 to 64, and 1,266 (12.4%) aged 65 or older.

People could identify as more than one ethnicity. The results were 66.4% European (Pākehā); 23.4% Māori; 14.6% Pasifika; 13.7% Asian; 1.4% Middle Eastern, Latin American and African New Zealanders (MELAA); and 2.3% other, which includes people giving their ethnicity as "New Zealander". English was spoken by 95.4%, Māori by 5.2%, Samoan by 4.6%, and other languages by 13.0%. No language could be spoken by 2.7% (e.g. too young to talk). New Zealand Sign Language was known by 0.9%. The percentage of people born overseas was 22.1, compared with 28.8% nationally.

Religious affiliations were 35.2% Christian, 2.1% Hindu, 0.9% Islam, 1.1% Māori religious beliefs, 1.4% Buddhist, 0.4% New Age, 0.1% Jewish, and 1.3% other religions. People who answered that they had no religion were 50.7%, and 6.9% of people did not answer the census question.

Of those at least 15 years old, 1,611 (19.9%) people had a bachelor's or higher degree, 4,569 (56.4%) had a post-high school certificate or diploma, and 1,935 (23.9%) people exclusively held high school qualifications. The median income was $47,300, compared with $41,500 nationally. 795 people (9.8%) earned over $100,000 compared to 12.1% nationally. The employment status of those at least 15 was 4,668 (57.6%) full-time, 954 (11.8%) part-time, and 276 (3.4%) unemployed.

Individual statistical areas
Name	Area (km^{2})	Population	Density (per km^{2})	Dwellings	Median age	Median income
Stokes Valley Central	1.49	2,229	1,496	738	34.5 years	$45,700
Stokes Valley North	4.80	3,570	744	1,254	36.6 years	$50,300
Delaney	2.07	2,595	1,254	903	32.6 years	$42,200
Manuka	1.31	1,806	1,379	636	39.1 years	$51,100
New Zealand					38.1 years	$41,500

== Education ==
Tawhai School is a state primary school for Year 1 to 6 students, with a roll of 331. It opened in 1970.

Koraunui School is a state primary school for Year 1 to 6 students, with a roll of 179. It was created by a merge of Stokes Valley School (established 1893; moved to Kiremu St in 1929) and Kamahi School (established 1964) in 2005, on the Stokes Valley School site.

Tui Glen School is a state primary school for Year 1 to 8 students, with a roll of 178. It opened in 1956.

All these schools are co-educational. Rolls are as of July 2026.

== Notable residents ==
Notable artist Guy Ngan was a resident of Stokes Valley for over 50 years. Ngan, born to Chinese parents in 1926, produced a range of work across a large range of media, including sculpture, painting, drawing, design, and architecture. His sculpture Mating Worms at the entrance to Stokes Valley has become the de facto symbol of the Valley since its installation in 1980, appearing on such things as the logo of local newspapers and school reports. Ngan was director of the New Zealand Academy of Fine Arts from 1976 to 1986. In 2006 a major retrospective of his work was held at the Wellington City Art Gallery. His sculpture Elevating Worms is in the Scott Court shopping mall, on the side facing Stokes Valley Road.

Several notable sportspeople call Stokes Valley their home. These include three representative association footballers: Craig Henderson, who plays professionally for Mjällby AIF in Sweden; New Zealand international Cole Peverley; and Dan Keat, who has played with Dartmouth College and L.A Galaxy in the United States. All three have represented New Zealand at age-group level, with Peverley playing once for the national team (the All Whites) in 2008.

Brothers Neville and Dave Hiscock were both internationally famous motorcycle racers who lived in Stokes Valley. Dave Hiscock dominated the New Zealand racing scene in the late 1970s and early 1980s, winning 40 consecutive races. He won the New Zealand Castrol Six Hour race five times and was placed five times in the Australian Castrol Six Hour Race in the 1970s and 1980s. His brother Neville Hiscock won the Australian Castrol Six Hour Race in 1981, and teamed with his brother to win the New Zealand Castrol Six Hour Race in 1982. Neville was killed in February 1983 while racing in Killarney, near Cape Town in South Africa.

Irene van Dyk the famous South African born New Zealand Netball player called Stokes Valley her home for at least 10 years from late 1990s to early 2000s. Irene van Dyk is recognised as the most capped international player of all time, and has won numerous titles for South Africa and then later New Zealand.

Craig Bradshaw, New Zealand international basketball player, also grew up in Stokes Valley. Bradshaw represented the country as a member of the Tall Blacks during the 2004 Summer Olympics campaign and the 2006 FIBA World Championships.

Wellington Lion & Hurricane, Brad Shields grew up in Stokes Valley.

Jack Gleeson, All Black coach in 1972 and from 1977 to 1978, owned the Stokes Valley tavern and the All Blacks practised at Delaney Park before the first test against the British and Irish Lions in June 1977.

== Bibliography ==
- "Cyclopedia of New Zealand," Vol. I, 1897
- "A Dictionary of New Zealand Biography," by G.A Schofield
- Bretts "Early New Zealand" pub Brett NZ, First Pub. 1887
- "The Streets of My City," by Irvine Smith
- "Who's Who in New Zealand" by G. A Schofield
