= Dave Hiscock =

David Hiscock (born 25 May 1953 in Stokes Valley) is a New Zealand motorcycle rider.

== Early life ==
Hiscock and elder brother Neville grew up in Stokes Valley, a suburb of Lower Hutt in Greater Wellington, where the pair rode an old BSA Bantam in grass paddocks and later perfected their skills on the Rimutaka Hill climb north of Upper Hutt. David and Neville began racing in 1972 at the Gracefield street circuit in Lower Hutt on Commando 750s. Dave finished eighth and Neville finished in fifth place.

== Career ==
Hiscock achieved fame in the 1970s and early 1980s, when he dominated the big-bike production class in Australia and New Zealand, gaining 40 consecutive wins on Suzuki GS1000 and GSX1100 bikes over the course of two seasons. His brother Neville was also an accomplished rider of 500cc, 750cc and 1100c motorcycles. The Hiscocks would race against each other or work together as a team, with one team win in the New Zealand Castrol Six Hour Race in 1982 on a Suzuki GSX1100 Katana that Dave and Neville shared. In all, Hiscock won the New Zealand Castrol Six Hour race five times.

Hiscock also achieved placings in the Australian Castrol Six Hour Race five times. In 1977, he was second in the 750 class on a GS750, finishing fifth overall with fellow Kiwi Peter Fleming.

Hiscock also competed in the Isle of Man TT Classic gaining several place holdings, and also the British and World F1 TT Championships, finishing third in both the Isle of Man TT formula 1 and World Road Race Championship in 1982, and finishing second in the British Street Bike Series in 1981.

== Retirement ==
Hiscock retired from competitive racing shortly after his brother was killed in February 1983 while racing at Killarney near Cape Town in South Africa. Hiscock lived in South Africa for a number of years before moving to Australia. On Boxing Day 2009, he returned to New Zealand and rode a demonstration lap around the Wanganui Cemetery Circuit on one of his old bikes, The Steve Roberts Built Plastic Fantastic.

== Racing statistics ==
=== New Zealand Castrol Six Hour wins ===
- 1978: Dave Hiscock and Neil Chivas – Suzuki GS1000
- 1979: Dave Hiscock and Neil Chivas – Suzuki GSX1100 (first model)
- 1980: Dave Hiscock and Neil Chivas – Suzuki GSX1100 Black piper (New Zealand Built special)
- 1982: Dave and Neville Hiscock – Suzuki GSX1100 Katana
- 1985: Dave Hiscock and Neil Chivas – Suzuki GSXR750

=== Australian Castrol Six Hour placings ===
- 1978: eighth place, Dave Hiscock and Peter Fleming – Suzuki GS750; 350 laps completed.
- 1979: fifth place, Dave Hiscock and Peter Fleming – Suzuki GS1000; 357 laps completed.
- 1980: ninth place, Dave Hiscock and Alan Hales – Suzuki GSX1100; 313 laps completed.
- 1981: fourth place, Dave Hiscock and Neil Chivas – Suzuki GSX1100; 310 laps completed.
- 1985: sixth place, Dave Hiscock and Neil Chivas – Suzuki GSX-R750; 234 laps completed.
