= Yamaha XV920 =

Yamaha Virago 920 (XV920)
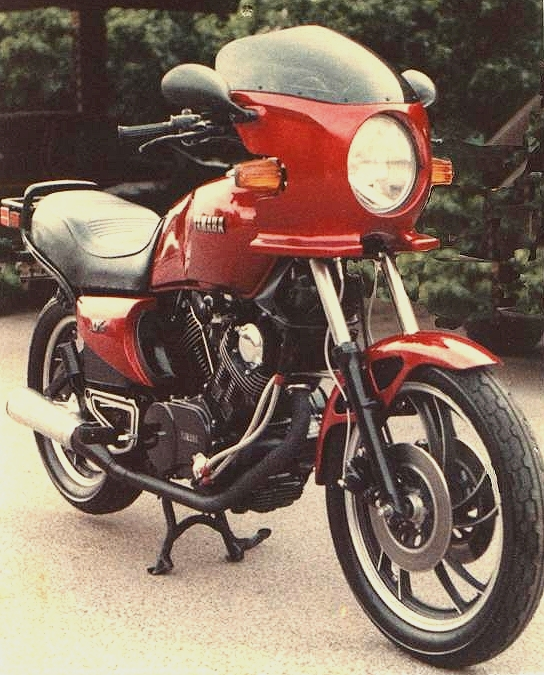
- Manufacturer: Yamaha
- Also called: Virago
- Production: 1981–1983
- Successor: Yamaha XV1000
- Class: Cruiser
- Engine: 920 cc (56 cu in) air-cooled OHC 75° V-twin
- Bore / stroke: 92 mm × 69.2 mm (3.62 in × 2.72 in)
- Compression ratio: 8.3:1
- Transmission: 5 speed, chain drive
- Suspension: Front: 38 mm (1.5 in) telescopic forks, 150 mm (5.9 in) travel Rear: Single shock.
- Tires: Front: 3.50H-19-4PR (XV920J, XV920K, XV920MK), 3.25H-19-4PR (XV920RH, XV920RJ) Rear: 130/90-16 67H (XV920J, XV920K, XV920MK), 120/90-18 65H (XV920RH, XV920RJ)
- Rake, trail: 29° 133 mm (5.2 in) (XV920J, XV920K, XV920MK), 28° 126 mm (5.0 in) (XV920RH, XV920RJ)
- Wheelbase: 1,540 mm (61 in) (XV920J, XV920K, XV920MK), 1,520 mm (60 in) (XV920RH, XV920RJ)
- Dimensions: L: 2,260 mm (89 in) (XV920J, XV920K, XV920MK), 2,220 mm (87 in) (XV920RH, XV920RJ); W: 840 mm (33 in) (XV920J, XV920K, XV920MK), 930 mm (37 in) (XV920RH, XV920RJ)
- Seat height: 750 mm (30 in) (XV920J, XV920K, XV920MK)
- Weight: 225 kg (496 lb) (XV920J, XV920K, XV920MK), 224 kg (494 lb) (XV920RH, XV920RJ) (wet)
- Fuel capacity: 14.5 L (3.2 imp gal; 3.8 U.S. gal) (XV920J, XV920K, XV920MK), 19 L (4.2 imp gal; 5.0 U.S. gal) (XV920RH, XV920RJ)
- Related: XV1000, XV1100

The Yamaha XV920 or Virago 920 was a Yamaha V-twin cruiser motorcycle. Made from 1981 to 1983, it was part of Yamaha's Virago line of cruisers. The 920 was redesigned in 1984 and engine size increased to 981 cc (59.9 cu in) resulting in the renamed XV1000.

== See also ==
- Yamaha XV1000
- Yamaha XV1100
