= Castrol Six Hour (New Zealand) =

Five time winner Dave Hiscock standing ready about to run to his machine for the start of the 1980 production race

The New Zealand Castrol Six Hour Race was an endurance motorcycle race that was held for fifteen years at Manfeild race track in Feilding, near Palmerston North, from 1974 to 1988. Many of New Zealand's top international riders competed at the Six Hour race; winners included Dave Hiscock (5-time winner), Neil Chivas (4-time winner), Graeme Crosby (3-time winner), Aaron Slight (2-time winner), and Ginger Molloy (first winner). The race was characterised by its exclusive use of unmodified standard production motorcycles and a running start where the racers had to run to their machines before they could start. There was special provisions that the machines were no older than 3 years old, which was a boon to the motorcycle industry in New Zealand at the time which saw a dramatic rise in the sale of Motorcycles after these events.

== Winners ==
- 1974: Ginger Molloy (solo) – Kawasaki Z1-A
- 1975: Graeme Crosby (solo) – Kawasaki Z1-B
- 1976: Graeme Crosby (solo) – Kawasaki Z1000
- 1977: Graeme Crosby and Tony Hatton – Kawasaki Z1000
- 1978: Dave Hiscock and Neil Chivas – Suzuki GS1000EN
- 1979: Dave Hiscock and Neil Chivas – Suzuki GSX1100ET
- 1980: Dave Hiscock and Neil Chivas – Suzuki GSX1100T (Black Pipe)
- 1981: Malcolm Campbell and Mick Cole – Honda CB1100R
- 1982: Dave Hiscock and Neville Hiscock – Suzuki GSX750SZ Katana
- 1983: Bill Biber and Phil Payne – Honda VF750F
- 1984: Alan DeLatour and Dave Martin – Honda VF1000F
- 1985: Dave Hiscock and Neil Chivas – Suzuki GSX-R750F
- 1986: Aaron Slight and Rob Doran – Yamaha FZ750
- 1987: Aaron Slight and Wayne Clark – Yamaha FZR1000
- 1988: Tony Rees and Dave Hicks – Yamaha FZR1000

Information from
