= Yamaha XS Eleven =

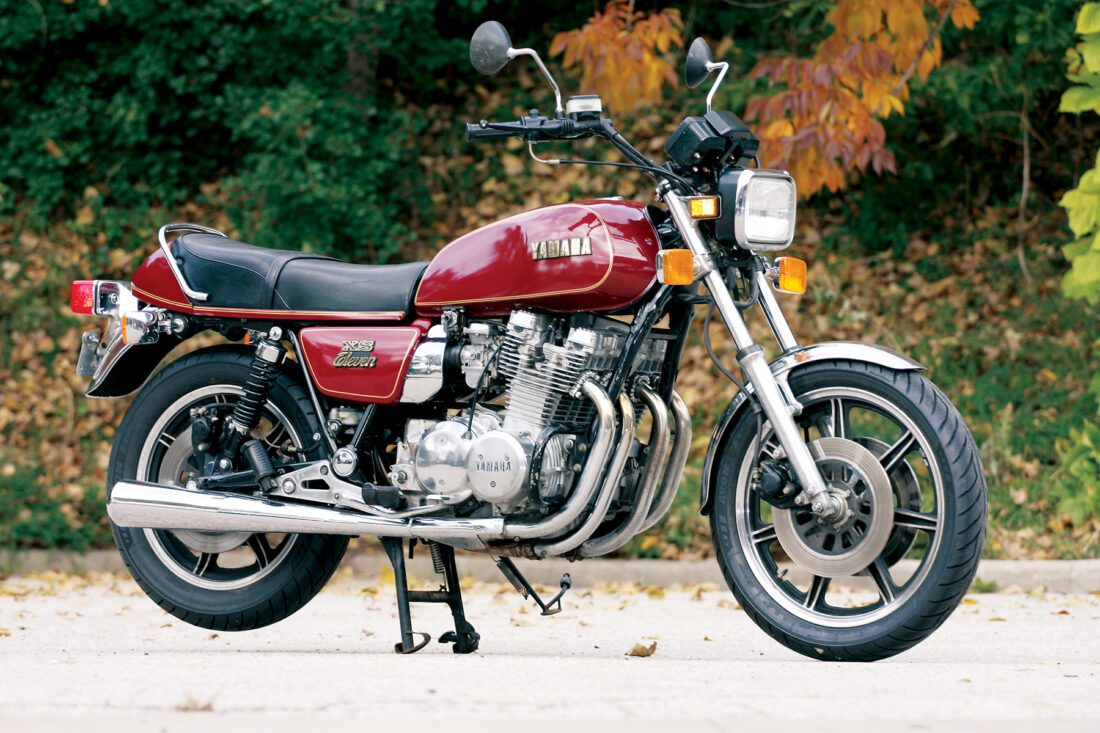
- 1978 XS Eleven 2H7 (First MY US Version)
- Manufacturer: Yamaha Motor Company, Ltd.
- Also called: XS 1100, XS Eleven, XS 1.1
- Production: 1977 (MY1978) – 1983
- Assembly: Iwata-shi, Shizuoka-ken, Japan
- Predecessor: XS 750
- Successor: FJ 1100
- Class: Standard
- Engine: Air cooled,1,101 cc (67.2 cu in) transverse four, DOHC, carb. (4) Mikuni BS34II constant velocity
- Bore / stroke: 71.5 mm x 68.6 mm
- Compression ratio: 1978-1979: 9.2:1 1980-1983: 9.0:1
- Top speed: 135 mph (217 km/h)
- Power: 95 hp (71 kW) @8000rpm (claimed)
- Torque: 66.5 lb⋅ft (90.2 N⋅m) @6500rpm (claimed)
- Ignition type: Transistorized contact-less TCI with vacuum advance
- Transmission: 5-speed with drive shaft
- Frame type: Duplex Cradle Frame
- Brakes: Front Dual 298 mm (11.7 in) single-piston floating caliper Rear Single 298 mm (11.7 in) single-piston floating caliper
- Tires: Front 3.5H19 Bridgestone; Rear 4.5H17 Bridgestone
- Rake, trail: 20.5°, 130 mm (5.1 in)
- Wheelbase: 1,530 mm (60.1 in)
- Dimensions: W: 812 mm (32.0 in)
- Seat height: 820 mm (32.3 in)
- Weight: 603 lb (274 kg) (wet)
- Fuel capacity: US: 20 L (5.3 US gal) EU/RoW: 24 L (6.3 US gal)
- Oil capacity: 3.7 L (3.9 US qt)
- Fuel consumption: 40.3 mpg_{‑US} (5.8 l/100 km)

The Yamaha XS Eleven motorcycle, also called XS 1100 and XS 1.1, is a Japanese standard produced from late 1977 (MY1978) to 1983, powered by an air-cooled 1,101 cc (67.2 cu in) 4-stroke, DOHC inline four-cylinder engine mounted transversely in a duplex cradle frame with swingarm rear suspension, shaft drive, and telescopic forks.

== History & Technology ==
The XS Eleven was the first four-cylinder four-stroke motorcycle from Yamaha. It built on technology first used by Yamaha in their earlier XS 750 four-stroke triple, but was an entirely new development and design. The XS 1100 engine was a new clean-sheet design with several innovative and relatively unconventional elements compared to other inline 4-cylinder motorcycle engines of the day.

The XS 1100 four-cylinder engine employed the same 68.6 mm stroke of the XS 750 triple, but had a larger 71.5 mm bore (the XS 750 had a bore of 68 mm) and therefore was an "oversquare" or "short-stroke" design. The XS1100 engine does not transmit power directly from the crankshaft to the clutch basket/input shaft, but rather via a wide hy-vo chain onto an intermediate jack-shaft with a cush-drive damper.

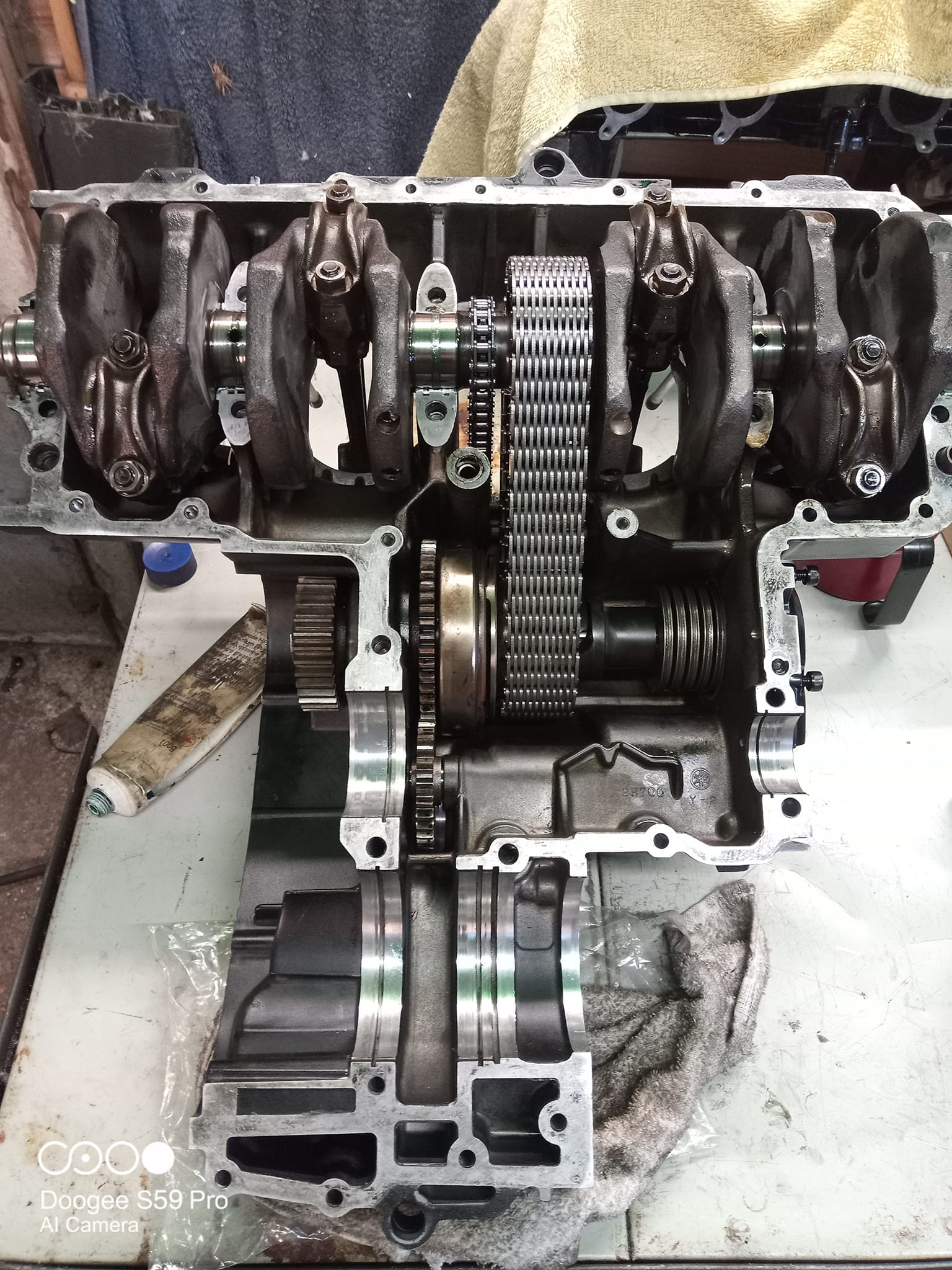
XS 1100 Engine - Upper Half of the Engine Case with Crankshaft, Cam Chain, Hyvo-chain and Jackshaft Installed

The engine rotation was therefore clockwise when viewed from the left side, while most transverse motorcycle engines of the day rotated counterclockwise. This jackshaft included a "cush-drive" shock damper for drive shaft drive trains. The electric starter also engaged the jackshaft to start the engine. The engine is mounted in rubber bushings making it an almost completely vibration-free running powerplant.

A significant new technology of the XS 1100 engine are the combustion chambers.

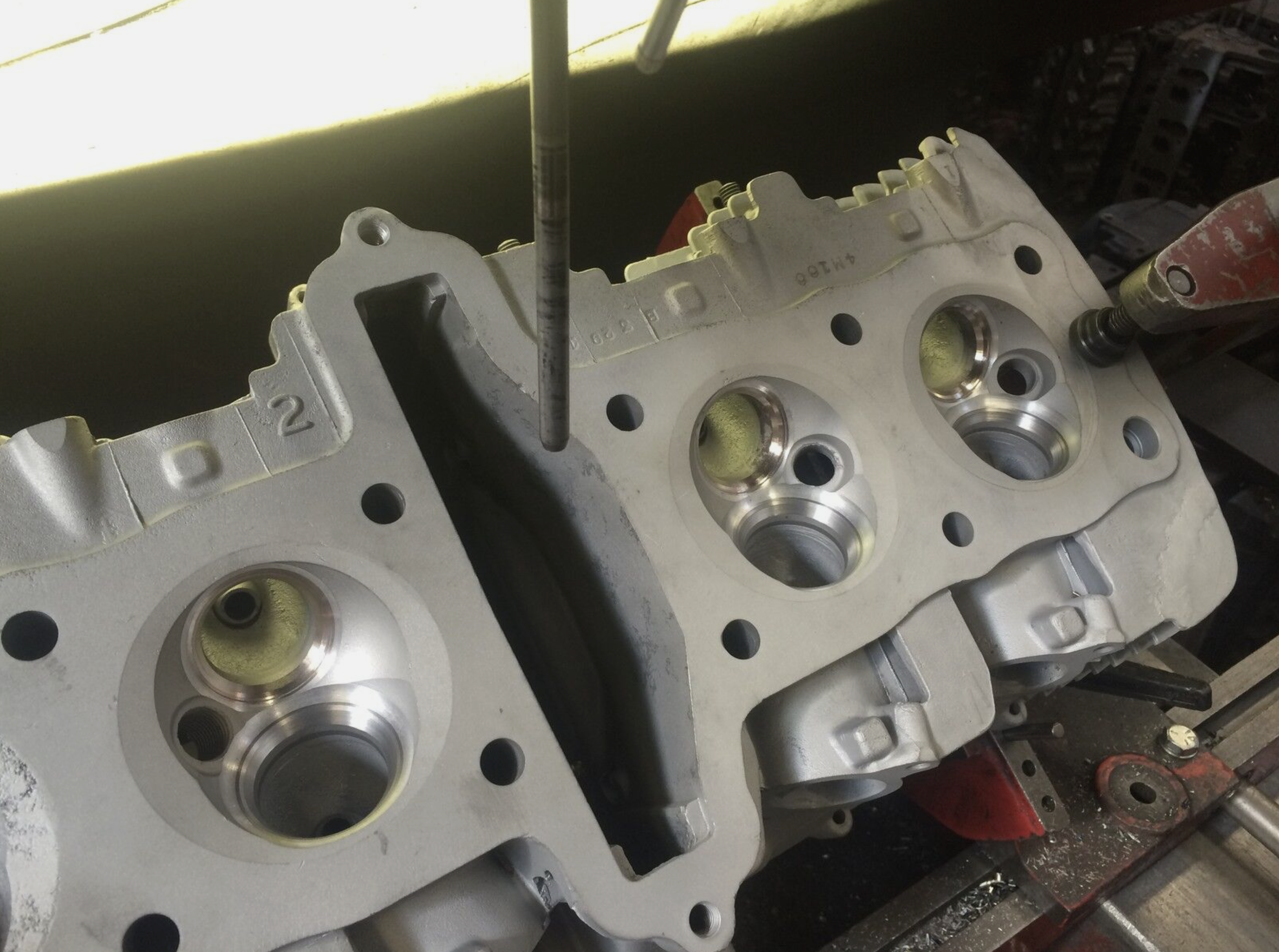
XS 1100 Cylinder Head with Polyspherical Combustion Chambers

To make adequate power most modern motorcycle engines of the day including the XS 750 had simple hemispherical combustion chambers with domed pistons. This design has a major drawback in relatively long flame travel during combustion and therefore requires much spark advance, which can cause severe pre-ignition (knocking) in high-performance engines. To improve combustion efficiency while eliminating the possibility of pre-ignition, Yamaha designed multi-angle "polyspheric" combustion chambers that required six different machining processes during manufacturing. This new design allowed for high compression without large piston domes and large ignition advance of over 40 degrees. The XS 1100 valves were the same as previously used in the XS 750 engine, but their angle differed from the previous 3-cylinder engine. Carburetion was delivered by four Mikuni BS34 II constant velocity (CV) carburetors and ignition via a contactless inductive trigger, transistorized electronic ignition unit (TCI) with vacuum advance.

Upon introduction, the XS Eleven immediately earned a reputation as a heavy, very powerful, and reliable bike. It was the first production bike in 1978 posting a sub-12 second 1/4 mile time (11.78 sec. @ 114.21 mph with a top speed of 135 mph - Cycle World 2/78), only to be surpassed in the 1/4 mile performance later in 1978 by Honda's CBX. The XS 1100 however remained the strongest production motorcycle in terms of torque and in-gear roll-on performance until the arrival of the Yamaha FJ series in 1984. In 1978 and 1979 it won Cycle World's Ten Best Bikes as the best Touring bike.

"Nobody gets far riding the XS Eleven before they become acquainted with the fact that it's strong; we had ridden ours over hundreds of open-road miles before going to the drag strip and knew it was a bullet." Cycle Magazine had this to say of the Eleven: "...the XS is a Rolls Royce with a blown Chrysler Hemi motor..."

The handling of the XS Eleven was not as well reviewed in period tests. "When this behemoth of a motorcycle actually hits a corner at anything approaching interesting speeds then it takes a good deal of muscle to lay it down. While the Yamaha doesn't disgrace itself in corners (not as much as some Z1000s I have known, for example) it doesn't commend itself either." Testers of the day all echoed the same story: "The XS1100 was a solid bullet in a straight line, but cornering at high speeds was done at your own risk." "Cycle warned its readers that the bike could easily go, stop, and steer — just never two at the same time." 'Which Bike' magazine simply described the XS1100 as having 'a bulletproof motor, and tea trolley handling'.

== North American models ==
The XS Eleven debuted in September 1977 (MY 1978) as the largest-displacement motorcycle in production at the time. It featured an 1101 cc four-cylinder dual overhead cam engine, dual front disc brakes, a rear disc brake, shaft drive and cast aluminum wheels. The XS Eleven was the most powerful mass-production motorcycle of the late 70s and posted superior performance numbers compared to its competition.

The US market XS Eleven was launched as the so-called "Standard" model (Versions: E - 1978, F - 1979 and G - 1980–81). In 1979 Yamaha followed the growing market trend for "factory custom" motorcycles by offering the XS Eleven "Special" (SF Model). The XS Eleven Special sported pullback buckhorn handlebars, a stepped seat, a 16-inch rear wheel, a smaller capacity tear-drop gas tank, a round instrument cluster, round lighting fixtures and an adjustable suspension with new air-assisted leading-axle front forks creating the "factory custom" or "soft chopper" look, a forerunner of the modern cruiser. The XS Eleven Special sold well in the US despite complaints about the poor ergonomics "What that translates to is a bike with an awkward riding position but generally excellent road manners. In fact, what irritated the staff mostly in how the bike rode and handled could be traced to the handlebar, which, although certainly as trendy as disco dancing, was not what the ergonomics doctor ordered for precise, comfortable control.", it became the by far best-selling XS Eleven variant in the US market. In 1980 the XS Eleven LH "Midnight Special" was launched in all global markets including the US. It was an all-black and gold version of the XS Eleven SF Special.

Beginning with the 1980 model year from September 1979 numerous changes were made to all US-market XS Eleven engines to comply with more stringent US emission regulations. The compression ratio was dropped from 9.2:1 to 9.0:1 via changes to the pistons and cylinder head design, increasing the volume of the combustion chamber and the piston domes. The intake valve size was increased from 36 mm to 38 mm and the exhaust valve size from 31 mm to 32 mm in an attempt to compensate for the reduction in compression ratio. The ports and valve bowls of the late heads are larger and flow better than early heads. Cam profiles and timing changed as well, reducing valve lift and duration. Late cam intake and exhaust duration decreased by 12 degrees, while exhaust lift increased. Late cam LSA increased from 102 degrees to 105 degrees. 1978/1979 "early" cams deliver approx. 2% more power than late cams. The 34mm Mikuni BS34 CV carbs remained in use but received very different jetting and settings. From 1980 on there were no longer pilot jet adjustment screws installed. The jet needle was set in its leanest position. The main jets which were # 137.5 in all four carbs on 1978 and 1979 models, were reduced to #115 main jets in carbs two and three (center carbs) and # 120 main jets in carbs one and four (outside carbs). While Yamaha maintained identical performance specs on paper, period tests confirmed a reduction in performance of the late-model XS Eleven compared to the 1978/1979 early models. In all period tests the 1980-1981 XS Eleven never again broke into the 11-second quarter mile as the 78-79 models had. Tests also commented that cold start and warm-up behavior had worsened noticeably and required unusually long operation of the cold start enrichment system. The transistorized ignition system was also changed and made non-adjustable in compliance with emission regulations. 1980 and later "emission" XS Eleven bikes are easy to spot since a kickstarter shaft was no longer installed in the transmission and a kickstarter lever was no longer provided.

For the 1981 model year a dedicated touring model called the XS Eleven "Venturer" was launched. It was equipped with a full touring fairing made for Yamaha by Pacifico. XS Eleven Venturers also came with matching panniers and a top case. Additionally, the Venturer was equipped with the EU/RoW 6.3 gallon tank for increased range and the Eu/RoW XS 1100 oil cooler system.

The mass volume production of the XS Eleven ended in 1981 in all markets and most XS Eleven models were superseded by the one-year-only 1982 XJ1100 Maxim, which used a slightly altered version of the XS1100 engine employing Yamaha's new YICS or Yamaha Induction Control System. In Europe because of the need for more sporting motorcycles the XS 1.1 S (5K7)was launched as a "sport" model until 1982 (MY 1983) to bridge the gap until Yamaha could introduce the MY 1984 FJ 1100 (and subsequently FJ1200) sport-tourers for 1984.

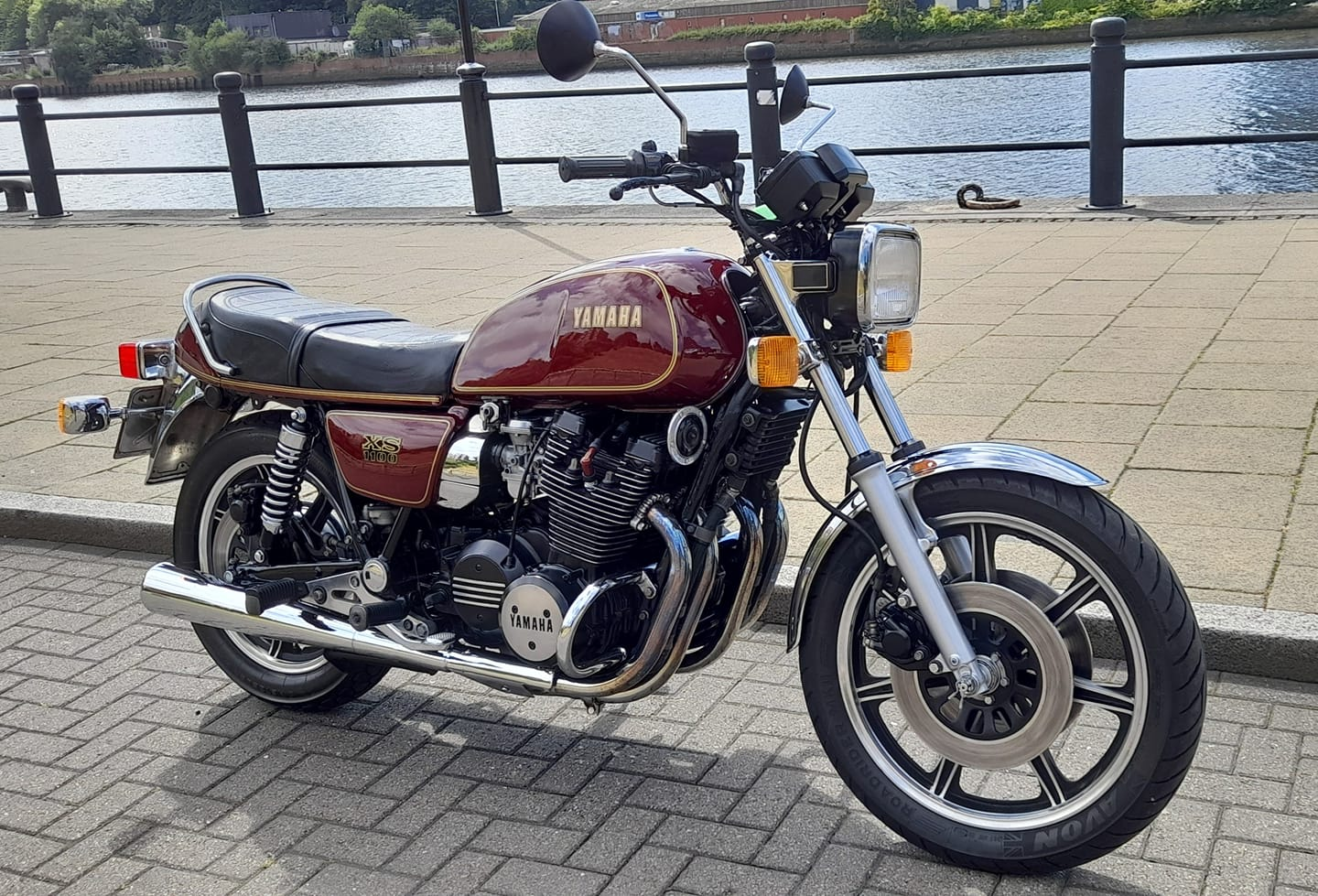
1978 XS1100 E (EU 2H9)

== European market XS 1100 ==
In Europe, the XS 1100 "Standard" was virtually the only model of the XS 1100 line-up. "Special" and "Midnight Special" models only accounted for a low single-digit percentage of all XS 1100 bike sales. There the XS 1100 remained in production until 1983. The European Yamaha XS 1100 Standard (2H9) model differed considerably from the North American XS 1100 Standard (2H7) model (2H7 versions: E - 1978, F - 1979, and G - 1980–81). The EU/RoW engines retained the more performance-oriented specs (Heads, valves, pistons, carburetor jetting, and ignition tune) of the "early US models throughout their entire production. The emission-related changes of the late model US XS Eleven were never introduced in EU/RoW bikes since such emission regulations did not exist outside the US. The EU/RoW XS 1100 Standard had a larger gas tank (6.3 gallons vs. 5.3 gallons), dual horns, and an EU-specific narrower, lower handlebar. The rider footpegs of the EU XS 1100 were mounted on different rear sets that positioned them higher and further back on the frame for more clearance. This required a shorter rear brake lever and a special linkage for a reversely mounted shift lever to work with these rear sets. Combined with the EU handlebar these rear sets allowed for a sportier riding position than the more relaxed riding position of the US model. The EU and RoW XS1100 Standard had satin black painted engines equipped from the factory with an oil cooler system, while the US engines were all natural, unpainted aluminum without an oil cooler system. Further, the rear fender of the EU version was longer and the rear turn signals were mounted to the license plate holder instead of to the rear frame as in the US version. Many EU versions also had a separate steering head lock welded to the left side of the steering head as required by law in various EU countries.

While having been the most popular model in the US, the 1979 - 1981 XS 1100 SF "Special" was virtually non-existent in Europe. It was, except for small differences required by law, identical to the US model. The European market also featured two limited production models: The 1979 XS 1100 Martini with a two-piece fairing designed by John Mockett, sporting a Martini color scheme similar to the Martini promotion bike that Mike Hailwood used as his personal transport at the 1978 Isle of Man TT. Only 500 "Martinis" were ever built exclusively for the EU market of which 274 were sold in Germany and only 65 in the UK. The second limited-production model was the 1981 - 1983 XS 1.1 S (5K7)(sold in Australia as the XS 1.1 R); a sporty version based on the XS 1100 Special but laid out more as a sports bike with a small cockpit fairing. Only 320 XS 1.1 S were sold since it was a gap-filler model. Yamaha recognized the change in market demands for more sporty bikes and built the XS 1.1 S to bridge this gap until the new FJ 1100 was ready for sale. Both of these limited production models were not available in the US market. Production of the XS 1100 LH "Midnight Special" built from 1980 to 1982 was also limited, but to far greater numbers. It was sold in all global markets.

== Racing: Production and Modified Classes ==
The XS 1100 dominated the 1978 Australian motorcycle production racing circuit in 1978 and continued to victories and high place finishes in production and superbike classes through 1981. The XS Eleven's win at the 1978 Castrol Six Hour production endurance race by the Pittman's Team of Jim Budd and Roger Heyes was Yamaha's first four-stroke motorcycle road racing victory at a major international event. "A key component of the race from the very start was that the motorcycles had to be completely stock, exactly as available the day after the race in dealers’ showrooms around the world, and they were rigorously inspected in both pre-race and post-race scrutineering to ensure that they were"

Flack of Motor Sport Retro wrote: "While the new CBX1000 and Suzuki were out and out sports bikes, the shaft-drive XS1100, affectionately called the 'Xcessive', was more of a muscle bike come tourer. Heavier than and not as fast as its rivals, the XS1100 did have one particular ability – winning races."

"In the lead up to the Six-Hour, the XS1100 had swept the Adelaide Three-Hour, the Perth Four-Hour and the Surfers Three-Hour. The unlikely XS1100 and Pitman Yamaha rider Greg Pretty had upstaged the biggest, baddest production bikes around, confounding everyone."

In the 1979 Castrol 6 hour, XS Elevens finished second (Greg Pretty, Jim Budd) third (Len Atlee, Gary Coleman) and fourth (Roger Heyes and D. Robbins)

The XS Eleven's racing results were notable because the motorcycle used shaft drive and was designed primarily as a long-stance touring model.

British motorcycle journalist Roland Brown, says in his book Superbikes of the Seventies: "The Yamaha's lack of reputation gives it one advantage these days, though, in that a clean XS such as this one costs less than its more successful contemporary rivals – whose performance advantage, so crucial then, is far less important now. Two decades and more after its launch, maybe the XS1100's time has finally come."

== Performance ==
In a 1978 test by Cycle World a stock XS1100 ran a quarter mile time of 11.78 s 1/4 mile @114.21 mph (183.8 km/h) with a top speed of 135 mph (217.3 km/h).

== Gallery ==
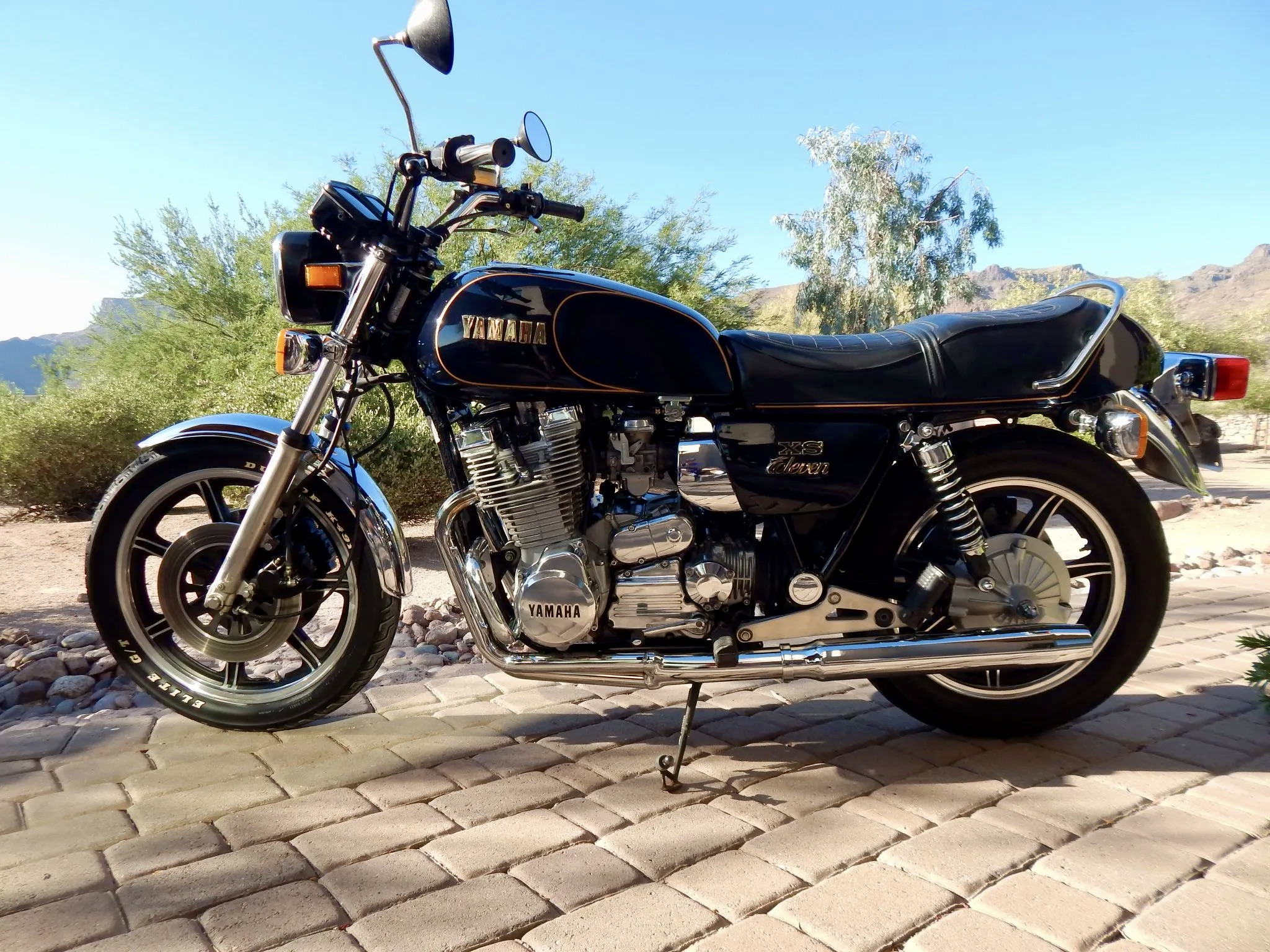
1978 XS Eleven F (2H7 - US version)

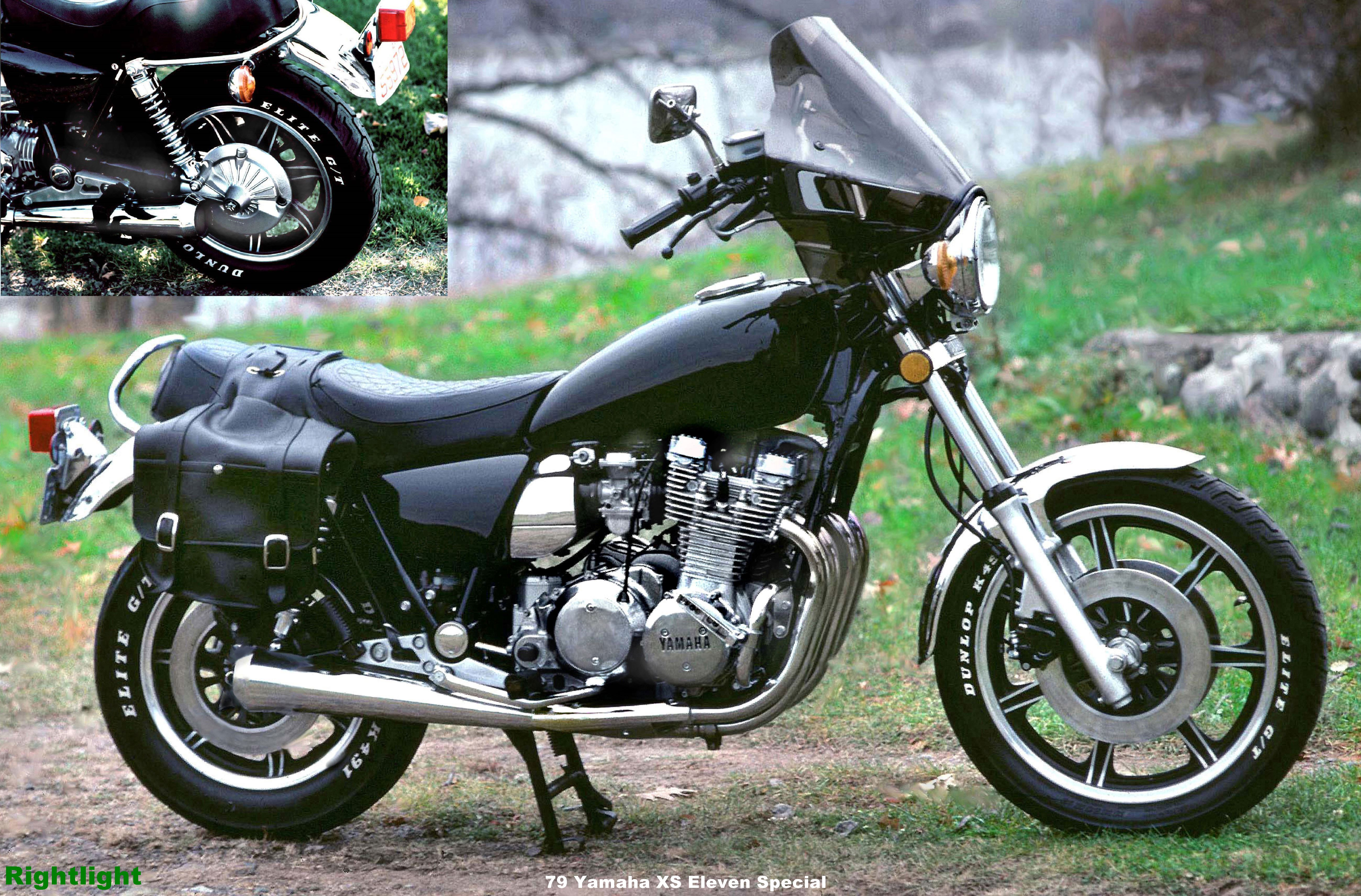
1979 Yamaha XS Eleven Special

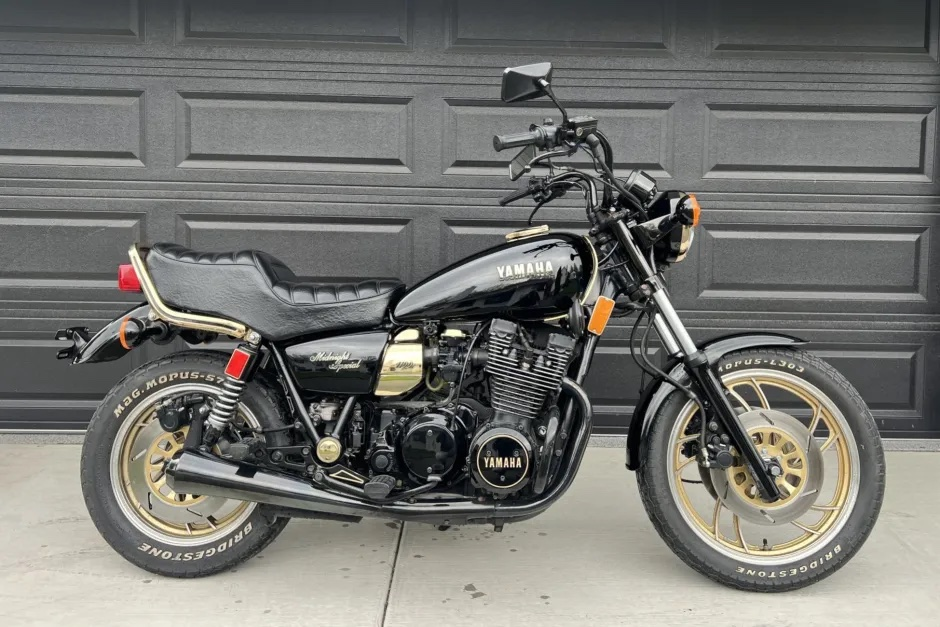
1981 XS Eleven Midnight Special

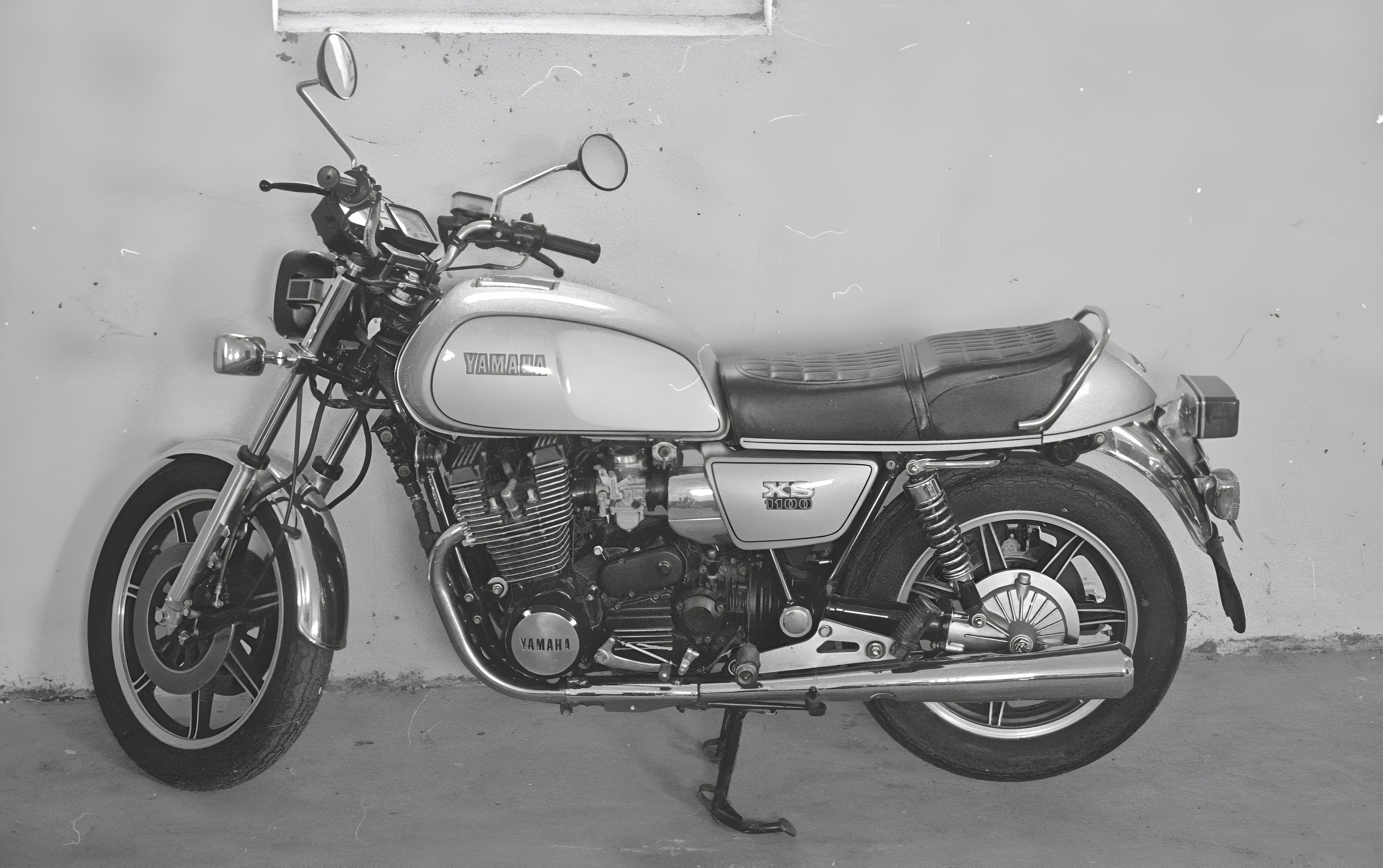
1978 XS 1100 E (2H9 - EU version)

== See also ==
- Yamaha XS750
- Yamaha XS650
