= Richard Hiscocks =

Canadian aerodynamicist

Richard Duncan Hiscocks MBE (4 June 1914 – 13 December 1996) was a Canadian aerodynamicist and aviation engineer, responsible for many well-known aircraft of Canadian origin.

== Early life ==
He was born in Toronto, Ontario. He went to school in Toronto and studied Engineering Physics at the University of Toronto, where he graduated in 1938. Over the summer at university he had worked at de Havilland Canada (DHC).

== Career ==
=== National Research Council ===
From 1940 he worked at the National Research Council (NRC), being sent to Germany to interview German aerospace scientists. He worked at the NRC later from 1968-76.

=== de Havilland Canada ===
He helped to design the DHC-3 Otter. Later designs he would work on at DHC, from 1976-79, were the Dash 7 and Dash 8.

== Publications ==
- Design of Light Aircraft, 1 December 1995, ISBN 0969980906

== Personal life ==
For his work at NRC, he was awarded the MBE in 1947.

He died aged 82. He is buried in St Mary's Anglican Church. He married the naturalist Bettie Jacobs (1915-2007).

== See also ==
- Leslie Frise of the Bristol Aeroplane Company
- Prof Richard Hiscocks (1907-98), English political scientist, Professor of International Relations from 1964 at the University of Sussex
