= William Hiscock =

William Ewart Hiscock
- Born: 13 January 1886; Dorchester, Dorset, England
- Died: 15 February 1942 (aged 56); Malta
- Burial place: Kalkara Naval Cemetery, Kalkara, Malta
- Military career
- Allegiance: United Kingdom
- Branch: Royal Navy
- Service years: 1900–1936; 1939–1942
- Rank: Lieutenant Commander
- Unit: HMS St Angelo
- Conflicts: First World War; Second World War
- Awards: George Cross; Distinguished Service Cross

William Ewart Hiscock, GC, DSC (13 January 1886 – 15 February 1942) was a Royal Navy officer who was awarded the George Cross for the "great gallantry and undaunted devotion" he displayed in September 1941 in attempting to defuse a novel Italian 'Torpedo Machine' in St George's Bay, Malta, during the Second World War.

== Naval career ==
Hiscock was mentioned in dispatches on 20 September 1918 while serving as a Gunner.

He was awarded the Distinguished Service Cross on 14 January 1941 while serving in the bomb disposal division at HMS St Angelo in Malta as a Lieutenant commander on the retired list.

On 3 February 1942. he was awarded the George Cross. The citation read:

The King has been graciously pleased to approve the award of the George Cross for great gallantry and undaunted devotion to duty to Lieutenant (Acting Lieutenant-Commander) William Ewart Hiscock, D.S.C., R.N. (retired) (to be dated 3rd February, 1942).

== Death ==
Hiscock and his wife Alice Beatrice Hiscock were killed when an enemy bomb landed directly on their home in St George's Barracks, Malta on 15 February 1942.
