= Neville Hiscock =

Neville Hiscock (27 March 1951 – 13 February 1983) was a New Zealand motorcycle racer in the 1970s and 1980s. He raced competitively in New Zealand, Australia, and South Africa.

Neville Hiscock along with his equally skilled brother Dave Hiscock dominated the competitive racing circuits in New Zealand and Australia and was just starting to make a name for himself internationally when he was killed in South Africa while racing. He was currently leading the race, when he fell and suffered severe head injuries. He died soon after never having regained consciousness. Neville was killed in February 1983, at Killarney, near Cape Town. Shortly after his brother Dave Hiscock retired from competitive racing, and continued to live in South Africa for a number of years.

Neville and his younger brother Dave Hiscock grew up in Stokes Valley, a suburb near Wellington, where they both rode an old BSA Bantam in grass paddocks, and later perfected their skills on the infamous Rimutaka hill climb nearby north of Upper Hutt. Neville and Dave began racing in 1972 at the Gracefield street circuit in Lower Hutt on Commando 750s. Neville finished in fifth place and Dave finished eighth.

Hiscock's notable achievements include winning the Australian Castrol Six Hour in 1981 with his team rider D. Petersen riding a Suzuki GSX1100 and completing 314 laps and winning the New Zealand Castrol Six Hour while teaming up with his brother in 1982 riding a Suzuki GSX1100 Katana. He also came second in the South African 6 Hour Race which prompted Suzuki to offer him full sponsorship for his last season before he died.
