= Ernest Hiscock =

Australian cricketer

Personal information
- Born: 9 April 1868; Penrice, South Australia
- Died: 16 December 1895 (aged 27); Alberton, South Australia
- Source: Cricinfo, 6 August 2020

Ernest Hiscock (9 April 1868 – 16 December 1895) was an Australian cricketer. He played in four first-class matches for South Australia between 1890 and 1894.

== See also ==
- List of South Australian representative cricketers
