= Yamaha XV750 =

Yamaha Virago 750 (XV750)
- Manufacturer: Yamaha
- Also called: Virago
- Production: 1981–1983, 1988-1998
- Predecessor: Yamaha XS750 Special
- Successor: Yamaha DragStar 650
- Class: Cruiser
- Engine: 748 cc (45.6 cu in) air-cooled OHC 75° V-twin
- Bore / stroke: 83.0 mm × 69.2 mm (3.27 in × 2.72 in)
- Compression ratio: 8.7:1
- Ignition type: Transistor controlled ignition
- Transmission: 5 speed, shaft drive
- Frame type: Pressed steel backbone using engine as stressed member
- Suspension: Front: 38 mm (1.5 in) telescopic forks, 150 mm (5.9 in) travel Rear: 1981-83 monoshock, 100 mm (3.9 in) travel, 1988-1998 double sided swingarm with twin shocks, 100 mm (3.9 in) travel
- Brakes: Front: 2, 2-piston calipers, 300 mm (11.7 in) disc Rear: 200 mm drum brake 100 mm (3.9 in) travel
- Rake, trail: 29° 30', 133 mm (5.2 in)
- Wheelbase: 1,525 mm (60.0 in)
- Dimensions: L: 2,230 mm (88 in); W: 805 mm (31.7 in)
- Seat height: 714 mm (28.1 in)
- Weight: 225 kg (496 lb) (wet)
- Fuel capacity: 12 L; 2.7 imp gal (3.2 US gal)
- Related: XV700, XV1100

The Yamaha XV750 or Virago 750 was a Yamaha V-twin cruiser motorcycle. Made from 1981 to 1983 and 1988 to 1998, it was part of Yamaha's Virago line of cruisers. It was Yamaha's first foray into the V-twin cruiser market and shares a frame and many components with the larger XV1100 Virago. This model suffered from starter problems.

== See also ==
- Yamaha XV700
