= Frank Hiscock (disambiguation) =

Frank Hiscock may refer to:

- Frank Hiscock (1834-1914), U.S. Representative and Senator from New York
- Frank H. Hiscock (1856-1946), New York Chief Judge

== See also ==
- Frank Harris Hitchcock, Postmaster General of the United States
