= Hiscock's Point =

Hiscock's Point was a small place with eight families near Burgeo.

== See also ==
- List of communities in Newfoundland and Labrador
