= Fred Hiscocks =

Australian-born cartoonist

Eceldowne or Eceldoune Frederick Hiscocks (19 March 1879 – Sydney, New South Wales, death date unknown) was an Australian-born cartoonist who worked in New Zealand and England. He was commonly known as Fred Hiscocks and signed his work 'EFH'. He produced popular 'cartoon booklets' in the early 1900s and his cartoons appeared in the Christchurch Weekly Press (1902-1914), New Zealand Free Lance, the Citizen (1909), and the Critic (1899). During World War I he produced cartoons for the Chronicles of the NZEF. He joined the London Daily News in 1925.

In 1914, he was fined for assaulting the sub-editor of the Free Lance, Arthur Claude Geddis.
