= Yamaha XS750 =

XS750
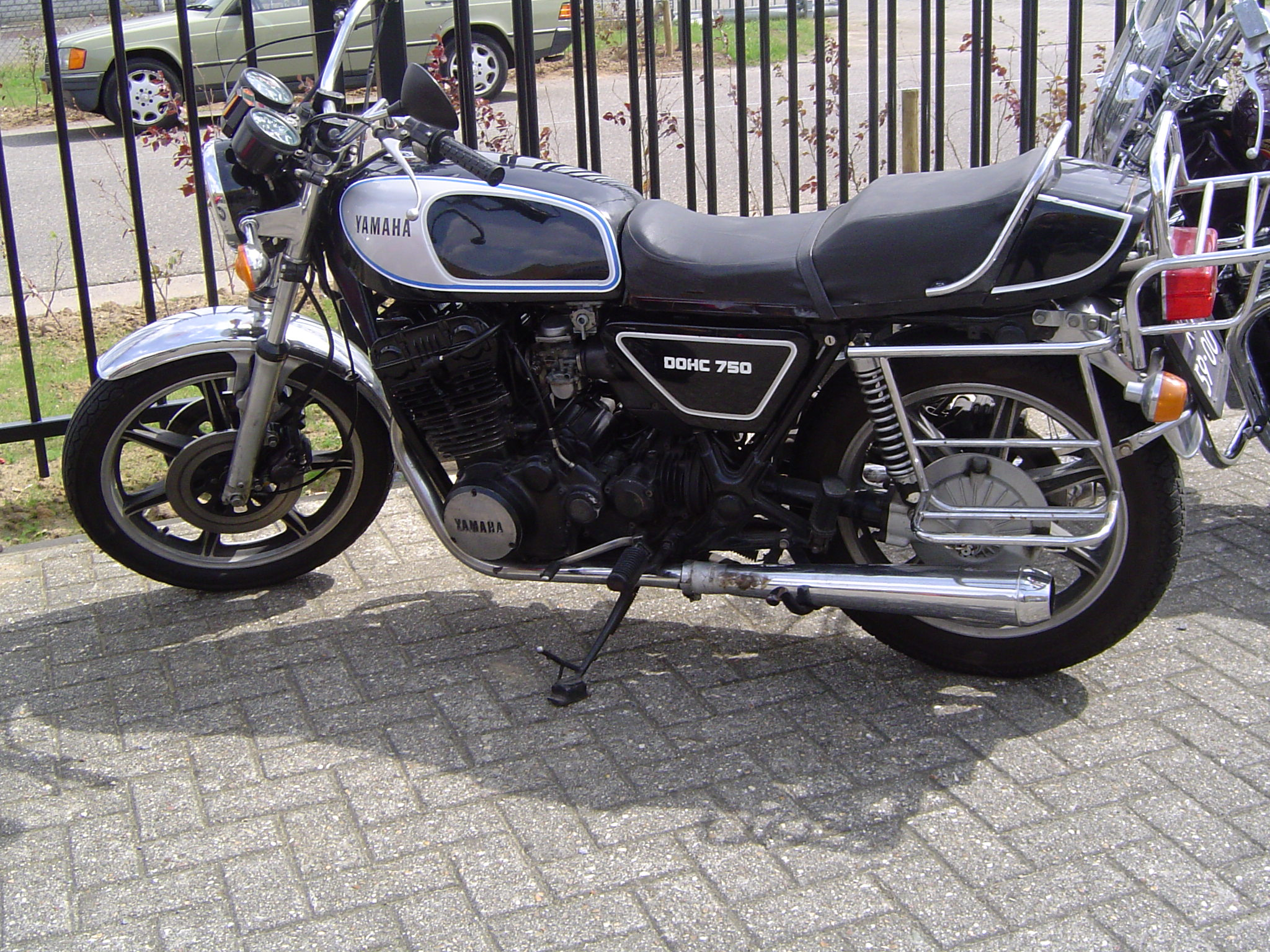
- Manufacturer: Yamaha Motor Company
- Also called: Yamaha GX750; Yamaha XS850
- Parent company: Yamaha
- Production: 1976-1981
- Successor: XJ750E
- Class: 750cc
- Engine: 4 stroke 3 cylinder air cooled DOHC
- Transmission: 5 speed, shaft drive to rear wheel
- Suspension: Front: Telescopic fork (d:36mm); Rear: Swing arm
- Brakes: Front: dual disc Rear: disc
- Tires: Front: 3.25H-19-4PR/1.8 Kg/cm (26 psi); Rear: 4.00H-18-4PR/2.0 Kg/cm (28 psi)
- Rake, trail: 27 deg / 114 mm (4.49 in)
- Wheelbase: 1,470 mm (57.9 in)
- Dimensions: L: 2,160 mm (85.0 in); W: 965 mm (38.0 in); H: 1,185 mm (46.7 in)
- Fuel capacity: 17 liters (4.5 US gal)

The Yamaha XS750 and XS850 was a line of inline three cylinder motorcycles produced by the Yamaha Motor Corporation from 1976 to 1981 for the worldwide motorcycle market. It was publicly voted by readers as the 1977 Motorcycle News Machine of the Year, ousting the sitting-winner of four-years, the Kawasaki Z1.

Released in Japan in 1976 as the GX750, it was fitted with wire wheels (as opposed to cast alloy in all other models) since cast wheels were not yet approved for road use in Japan. The XS750 became the name for the export model. The last model year of manufacturing was 1981.

== Design ==
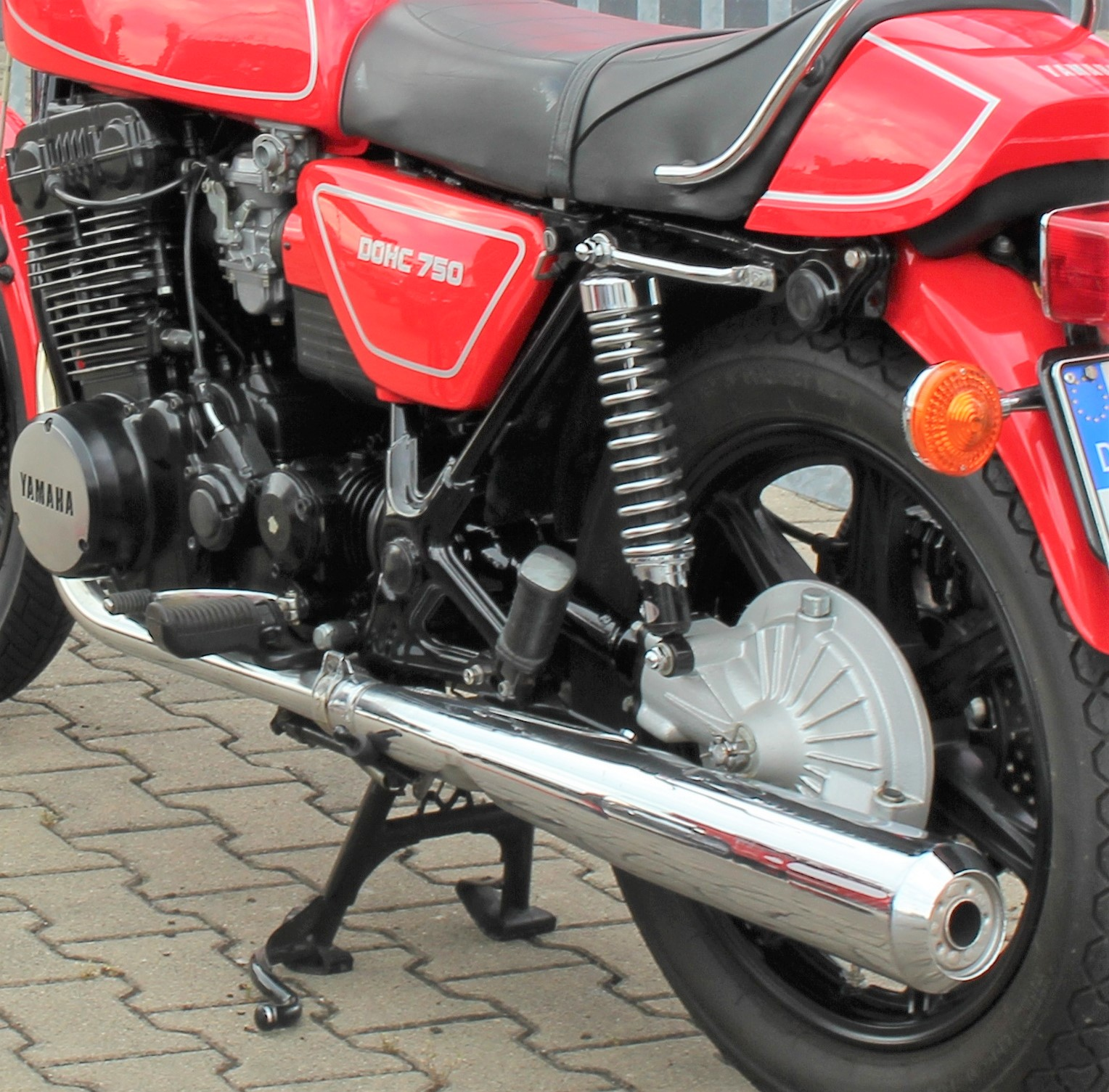
Shaft drive from gearbox area behind engine to rear wheel

These motorcycles were fitted with shaft drive, and can be referred to as "triples" because they have three cylinders. During the first four model years, the engine displaced 750 cc. This was increased to 826 cc for the final two model years, but was referred to as an 850. There were various changes made to the model over the years.

== 1976 XS750 C ==
Very few of these bikes seem to have been made and even fewer survived. The cast wheels were in an unpainted finish and the decals were in a distinctive stripe design on the tank and side panels. This bike had a 3-1 exhaust system, and Mikuni “Mark I” carburetors. The air box assembly was different from later years. The air filter could be changed by opening the seat. This model had triple contact breaker points making timing adjustment complex. Also featured was a separate regulator and rectifier. The seat has a short tail piece this year. Maximum power in Japanese specifications is 60 PS (44 kW; 59 bhp).

This bike received good reviews in Cycle World, who called it a "Bargain BMW" and rated it one of their top 10 bikes in the world in 1976.

== 1977 XS750 D and 2D ==
A number of these made it out to export markets in late 1976. This bike was pretty much the "C" with a paint job. The tank now sports the familiar piping around the contours picking out the detail. Problems with reliability led to a further release in 1977. A particular problem was with second gear, which had a habit of dropping into neutral under load. Canny riders would short-shift from first to third gear; the engine had enough torque to support this technique. The Yamaha fix tended to be temporary, so not worth doing. The "D" had the same tail piece as the "C" and the early GX750.

Released to return confidence to the model, the 2D received some modifications from the D model. Introduced in May 1977, the bike now had a 3 into 2 exhaust system with silencers on both sides of the bike, and other improvements to the engine to improve reliability and increase power (larger air cleaner box, adjusted valve timing and combustion chamber design, transistor ignition rather than the original points system). Power increased to 67 PS (49 kW; 66 bhp) in Japanese specifications. The headlight was changed to a halogen bulb, and a seat bar added to the rear seat. Fitted with an electronic regulator/rectifier unit. This bike has a different seat from the "C" and "D". The tail piece is longer and doesn't fit the early seats.

== 1978 XS750 E and SE ==
The now popular “2D” was upgraded to keep up with the market. Yamaha added electronic ignition this year but retained the mechanical timing advancing unit. They also replaced the carburetors for Mikuni “Mark II” CV models. These offered easier maintenance and a “two position enricher” (Choke) as opposed to the single position on the "Mark I" model. The engine again had some improvements including cam shafts to boost the power of the engine. The rev limit was raised to 9000 rpm this year from 7500 which the electronic ignition had allowed. Later “E” models also had a viewing window for the engine oil added in place of the dipstick.

This year also saw the introduction of the XS750 "SE", Special or US custom model. With longer front forks and a teardrop shaped tank with shorter exhausts and seat it had a "chopper" appearance in contrast to the tourer or now referred to as the "Standard" XS750 E. The change of carburetors also meant a change of air box design and the air filter was now changed without lifting the seat. The XS750 also came with a stock fairing with full storage and aerodynamic enclosure of the rider. The fairing also introduced additional stability to the motorcycle by creating additional rake to the frame. This was a first for bikes of this time, especially those in the 2400 to 2700 dollar price range.

== 1979 XS750 F and SF ==
As above but European models came with an optional 24-litre fuel tank and also a new paint scheme. The cast wheels from this year on were of the "tubeless design". The kickstarter was dropped and blocked off with a grommit.

== 1980 XS850 G, SG, and LG ==
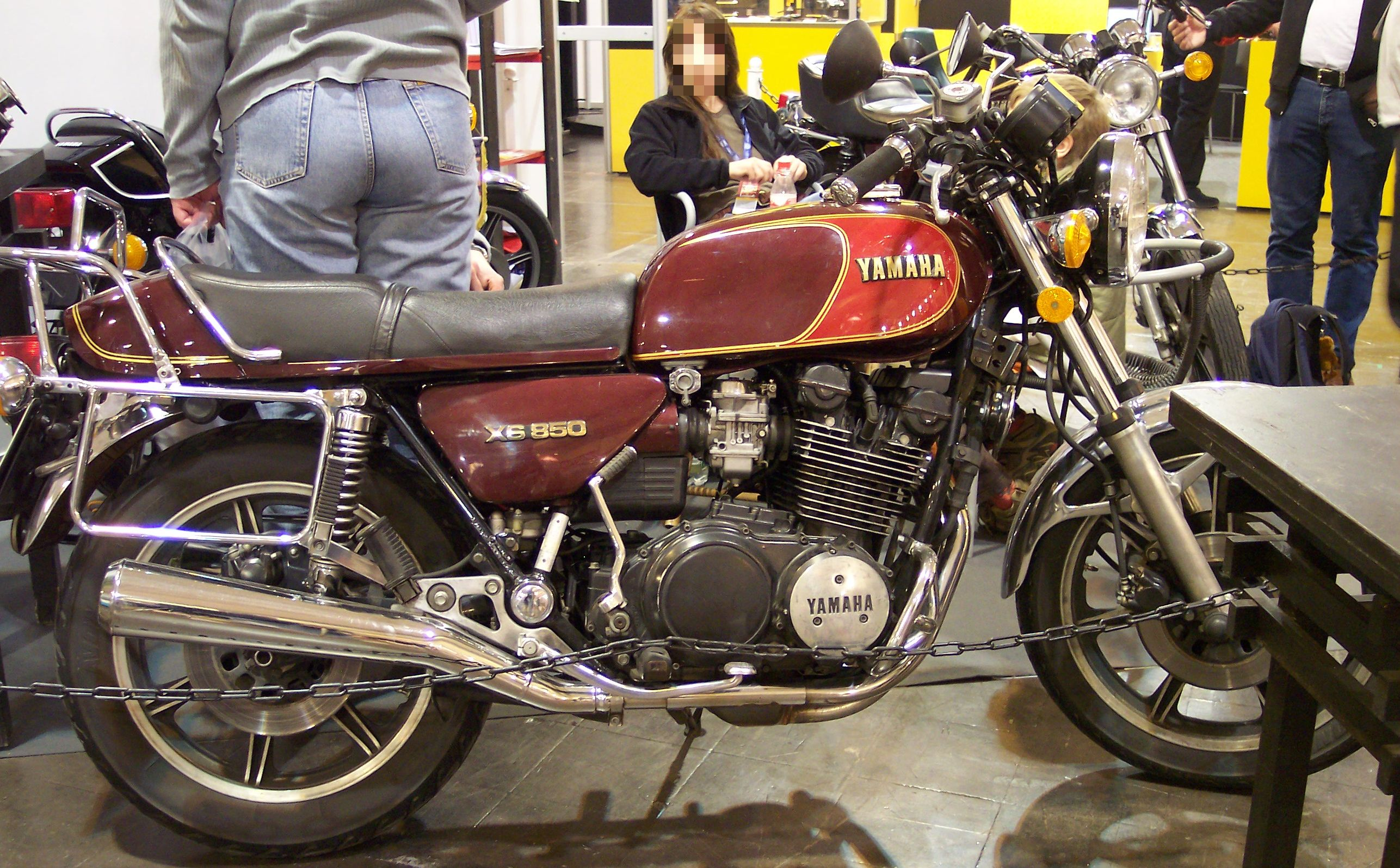
Yamaha XS 850

The 826 cc replacement for the XS750 was a very similar beast. The engine received bigger barrels and pistons, a beefier crankshaft, a wider primary chain and better oil ways. The addition of an oil cooler helped keep things cool. The European 850 G came with the 24-litre tank as standard, plus a huge 8-inch diameter headlight. Also added were frame improvements including a new swing arm mounting and alloy footrest carriers. Also to be seen in some F models. In the United States, the 850 G had a more custom look with a seat with no tail piece like the SG and different side panels. The exhausts on the European models have an offset in them to improve ground clearance at the rear. The carburetors changed from Mikunis to Hitachis for environmental reasons.

The LG was the "Midnight Special", sporting black and gold designs on the engine and other parts. The European models had a wider seat and tail piece than the 750's, but looked much more like them than the American 850 G.

== 1981 XS850 H, SH, and LH ==
As previous year. Also the last production year although models continued to sell for a few years after this. One final change, the ignition system was updated to electronic advanced timing and the mechanical advance assembly was removed. The LH was the "Midnight Special", sporting black and gold designs on the engine and other parts.

== See also ==
- Yamaha XS Eleven
- Yamaha XS650
