= Steve Hiscocks =

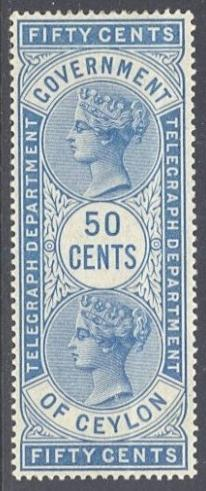
An 1894 telegraph stamp of Ceylon.

Dr. Steve E.R. Hiscocks (died 4 October 2010) was an expert on telephone and telegraph stamps who in 1982 wrote the first catalogue on the subject since Walter Morley's work of 1900. He also wrote the first ever catalogue of telephone cards (1988) and the first catalogue of telegraph seals (2007).

Outside collecting, Hiscocks was a civil servant in the Department of Energy of the British Government.

== Publications ==
- Telegraph & Telephone Stamps of the World: A priced and annotated catalogue, Woking, 1982. ISBN 0-9508301-0-0
- The Collector's Book of Telephone Cards, Woking, 1988. ISBN 0-9508301-1-9
- The Collector's Book of Telephone Cards, 2nd revised edition, Stanley Gibbons, London, 1990. ISBN 0-85259-264-7
- Collect British and Irish Telephone Cards, Stanley Gibbons, London, 1991. ISBN 0-85259-307-4
- Telephone Cards of the World: Great Britain and Ireland Pt. 1, 1993. ISBN 1-898344-00-0
- Telephone Cards of the World: North America, Caribbean and Atlantic Pt. 2, World Telephone Card Publications, 1994. ISBN 1-898344-01-9
- H & G Standard Catalogue of USA Telephone Cards: Including Canada: 1995–1996, 2nd edition, Telecard Publications Inc., 1995. (With C.M. Garibaldi) ISBN 0-9648605-0-3
- Telephone Cards: A Collector's Handbook, Woking, 1996. ISBN 0-9508301-2-7
- Telegraph Seals: A World Catalogue, Woking, 2007. ISBN 0-9508301-3-5
