= Castrol Six Hour =

Motorcycle race held in Australia

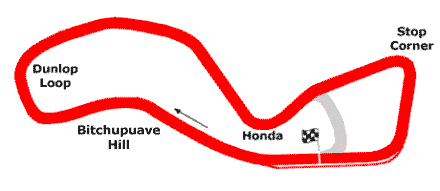
- Venue: Amaroo Park
- Location: Annangrove, New South Wales; 33°39′3″S 150°56′1″E
- Corporate sponsor: Castrol
- First race: 1970
- Last race: 1987
- Duration: 6 hours
- Most wins (rider): Ken Blake, Michael Dowson (3)
- Most wins (manufacturer): Kawasaki, Yamaha (5)

Circuit information
- Length: 1.94 km (1.21 mi)
- Turns: 10

The Castrol Six Hour was a motorcycle race for production motorcycles, held in Australia from 1970 through to 1987.

== History ==
The race was run by the Willoughby District Motorcycle Club and held at Amaroo Park until 1983, when it was moved to Oran Park for 1984 until the final race in 1987. At the time it was the biggest and most prestigious bike meeting in Australia, enjoying huge support from not only Castrol and much of the motorcycle trade, but also was a great hit with the motorcycle community who saw it as a real test of the motorcycles they might wish to buy. The main character of the race being the bikes had to be stock and were rigorously inspected to ensure they were. It also had considerable television coverage and either contributed to or was the result of a motorcycle sales boom. The 6 Hour was so important to the industry, Honda designed the CB 1100R(B), to win the race. The first model had no fairing and is totally hand made.

Originally the race was called the Castrol 1000 in recognition of the prize money on offer from Castrol. $1000 was a considerable sum in 1970 as can be seen by the fact that the eventual winning bike in the first race, a Triumph Bonneville 650, could be purchased for around $1,150.00 at the time.

At first the race was for 3 classes, Unlimited, 500 cc and 250 cc. The race continued in that format until 1975, when the 250 cc class was dropped for "rider safety". Then in 1978 the 500 cc class was dropped and a 750 cc class introduced. For 1983 The maximum capacity was limited to 1000 cc, probably to comply with the ACCA regulations and in 1987 a 250 cc class was reintroduced.

The first race was run on Sunday, 18 October 1970, when 68 riders lined up for the Le Mans start. Thirteen riders dropped their machines in the first four laps.

Honda 750s filled nine of the top ten places in 1971. Tony Hatton and Paul Spooner came second on a Yamaha 650. The heavy and powerful Hondas were all expected to stop for tyre changes. Hatton and Spooner moved up in the placings as each Honda stopped to change tyres. They realised too late that Brian Hindle and Clive Knight were planning to finish the race without changing tyres. Despite Haton's and Spooner's efforts, they were unable to catch the Honda. Yamaha subsequently advertised that its 650 was quicker than nine out of ten superbikes.

The 1972 race ended in controversy with Joe Eastmure initially being declared winner on a 315 cc Suzuki 350. Two hours later Kawasaki 750 riders Mike Steele and Dave Burgess, who had crashed four minutes before the finish, were declared winners. A protest was lodged against them on the grounds that they had returned to the circuit without making a pit stop for a safety inspection. Eastmure's bike was later disqualified for not having a horn. He returned in 1973 riding the same bike (with horn) and placed outright sixth, winning the 500 cc class.

In the 1974 race BMW R90 riders Bryan Hindle and Clive Knight were initially declared winners. Kawasaki Z1-900 riders Len Atlee and Ken Blake were declared winners after a recount. Another Kawasaki was disqualified for petrol tank modifications. Two BMW teams would have placed second and third, but were disqualified for suspension modifications. Yamaha RD-350 riders Barry Lemon/David Robbins won the 500 cc class with 333 laps, followed by Kawasaki H1-500 riders Peter Stronach and Jeff Sim (331 laps) and Honda CB-500 riders Lynton Carle and Otto Muller (330 laps). 250cc class winners (subject to the outcome of protests) were Lee Roebuck/Jeff Parkin (Yamaha RD-250) 326 laps, followed by Vaughan Coburn/Ron Burke (Suzuki GT-250) 326 laps and Terry Brown/Paul Grayden (Yamaha RD-250) 325 laps. Kawasaki 750 rider Warren Willing was disqualified For alleged gearbox irregularities.

The end came partly because of Castrol pulling out of road racing to concentrate its efforts on initially the Mr Motocross Series and then V8 Supercars, and partly because of controversy that had dogged the event since the start over eligibility of bikes or components. Also races for production bikes were losing support as more people moved to the new Superbikes. The move to Oran Park was also not popular with many fans.

There have been attempts to revive the idea of a six-hour endurance race, including one at Phillip Island, one at Eastern Creek and two at Oran Park in the 1990s and early 2000s but none met with the success of the original six-hour.

== Star riders ==
Many famous names competed in the event, such as Mike (the bike) Hailwood (UK), Wes Cooley (USA), John Kocinski (USA), Ken Blake, Robert Holden and Graeme Crosby (NZ Kawasaki). Winners of the event include a virtual "who's who" of Australian motorcycle racing during the 1970s and 1980s, including Rob Phillis (Mick Hone Suzuki), Andrew Johnson (Mentor Motorcycles-Honda), Warren Willing (Team Yamaha), Wayne Gardner (Team Honda), Gregg Hansford (Team Kawasaki), Michael Dowson, Malcolm Campbell (Team Honda) and Kevin Magee (TZ750), Michael Cole (Team Honda), Malcolm Campbell (Team Honda). A host a privateers contested the 6-hour putting them on even (horsepower) footing with factory backed racers.

== Results ==
Year	Position	Riders	Manufacturer	Motorcycle	Laps
1970
1970	1st	Len Atlee, Brian Hindle	Triumph	Bonneville 650	312
1970	2nd	C Brown, R Jackson	Honda	CB750	308
1970	3rd	D Burgess, Joe Eastmure	Suzuki	T20-250	303
1971
1971	1st	Brian Hindle, Clive Knight	Honda	CB750	333
1971	2nd	Tony Hatton, Paul Spooner	Yamaha	XS650	330
1971	3rd	Max Robinson, B Gault	Honda	CB750	328
1972
1972	1st	Ross Hedley, Les Kenny	Kawasaki	H2 750	334
1972	2nd	G Thomas, M Robinson	Honda	CB750	332
1972	3rd	Ken Blake, J Curley	Ducati	GT750	330
1973
1973	1st	Ken Blake	Kawasaki	Z1B 900	342
1973	2nd	Warren Willing, John Boote	Kawasaki	H2 750	341
1973	3rd	Tony Hatton	BMW	R75	340
1974
1974	1st	Ken Blake, Len Atlee	Kawasaki	Z1 900	344
1974	2nd	John Warrian	Kawasaki	Z1 900	336
1974	3rd	K Chevell, B Mayes	Kawasaki	Z1 900	334
1975
1975	1st	Gregg Hansford, Murray Sayle	Kawasaki	Z1 900	335
1975	2nd	Ken Blake	BMW	R90S	331
1975	3rd	Roger Heyes, Shaw Crymble	Kawasaki	Z1 900	329
1976
1976	1st	Jim Budd, Roger Heyes	Kawasaki	Z1B	350
1976	2nd	Ken Blake, Tony Hatton	BMW	R90S	349
1976	3rd	Dan Oakhill, Ross Pink	Ducati	900SS	348
1977
1977	1st	Ken Blake, Joe Eastmure	BMW	R100S	356
1977	2nd	Jim Budd, Neil Chivas	Kawasaki	Z1B 900	356
1977	3rd	Alan Hales, Dave Burgess	Kawasaki	Z650	353
1978
1978	1st	Roger Heyes, Jim Budd	Yamaha	XS1100	354
1978	2nd	John Warrian, Terry Kelly	Ducati	900SS	353
1978	3rd	Mick Cole, Dennis Neil	Honda	CBX1000	353
1979
1979	1st	Alan Hales, Neill Chivas	Suzuki	GS1000	360
1979	2nd	Greg Pretty, Jim Budd	Yamaha	XS1100	357
1979	3rd	Len Atlee, Gary Coleman	Yamaha	XS1100	357
1980
1980	1st	Andrew Johnson, Wayne Gardner	Honda	CB1100R	322
1980	2nd	Neil Chivas, John Pace	Suzuki	GSX1100	322
1980	3rd	Roger Heyes, Dennis Neil	Honda	CB1100R	318
1981
1981	1st	Dave Petersen, Neville Hiscock	Suzuki	GSX1100	314
1981	2nd	Roger Heyes, Malcolm Campbell	Suzuki	GSX1100	313
1981	3rd	Ron Boulden, Stephen Gall	Yamaha	XS1100	312
1982
1982	1st	Wayne Gardner, Wayne Clarke	Honda	CB1100R	367
1982	2nd	John Pace, Peter Byers	Honda	CB1100R	367
1982	3rd	Alan Blanco, Geoff French	Honda	CB1100R	367
1983
1983	1st	Malcolm Campbell, Rod Cox	Honda	VF750F	372
1983	2nd	Rob Phillis, G French	Honda	VF750F	372
1983	3rd	R Heyes, Robert Holden	Suzuki	GSX1000S	372
1984
1984	1st	Richard Scott, Michael Dowson	Yamaha	RZ500	260
1984	2nd	Wayne Gardner, John Pace	Honda	VF1000	260
1984	3rd	Neil Chivas, Robert Holden	Suzuki	Katana 750	256
1985
1985	1st	Richard Scott, Paul Feeney	Yamaha	FZ750	238
1985	2nd	Len Willing, Iain Pero	Kawasaki	GPz900R	238
1985	3rd	Michael Dowson, Kevin Magee	Yamaha	FZ750	238
1986
1986	1st	Michael Dowson, Kevin Magee	Yamaha	FZ750	270
1986	2nd	Robert Holden, Brent Jones	Suzuki	GSXR750	270
1986	3rd	Richard Scott, Rod Cox	Yamaha	FZ750	269
1987
1987	1st	Kevin Magee, Michael Dowson	Yamaha	FZR1000	269
1987	2nd	Peter Byers, James Knight	Yamaha	FZR1000	266
1987	3rd	Robert Holden, Aaron Slight	Suzuki	GSX-R750H	265
