= Yamaha XV1100 =

Yamaha Virago XV1100
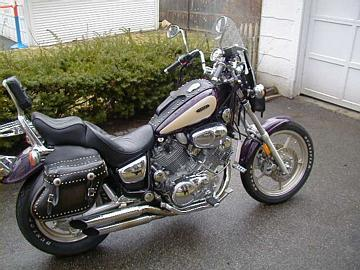
- Manufacturer: Yamaha Motor Company
- Production: 1986-1999
- Predecessor: Yamaha XV1000
- Successor: Yamaha DragStar 1100
- Class: Cruiser
- Engine: 1,063 cc (64.9 cu in), air cooled, 2 x SOHC, wet sump
- Bore / stroke: 95 mm × 75 mm (3.7 in × 3.0 in)
- Compression ratio: 8.3:1
- Ignition type: Digital
- Transmission: Wet multi-plate clutch, 5 speed, shaft drive
- Frame type: Pressed steel backbone
- Suspension: Front: telescopic fork, 150 mm (5.9 in) travel Rear: swingarm, 97 mm (3.8 in) travel
- Brakes: Front: Dual 282 mm (11.1 in) discs Rear: drum
- Tires: Cast 5-spoke aluminium alloy wheels. Front: 100/90-19 57H; Rear: 140/90-15M/C 70H
- Rake, trail: 32°, 129 mm (5.1 in)
- Wheelbase: 1,525 mm (60.0 in)
- Dimensions: L: 2,285 mm (90.0 in); W: 840 mm (33 in); H: 1,190 mm (47 in)
- Seat height: 715 mm (28.1 in)
- Fuel capacity: 16.8 L (3.7 imp gal; 4.4 US gal)
- Related: Yamaha DragStar 1100

The Yamaha Virago XV1100 is a motorcycle manufactured by Yamaha Motor Corporation between 1986 and 1999. It was one of several in the Virago line and was positioned as a large-size cruiser with an engine displacement of 1,063 cc (64.9 cu in).

It was one of the few cruiser-style motorcycles available with a shaft drive instead of a chain or belt final drive system, as well as a V-twin engine of that size. Its heavily chromed body styling was also distinctive.

== History ==
The Virago line was born in 1981 with the XV750. In 1982, the larger 920 was introduced alongside the 750, with several more deluxe features. The 920 was redesigned in 1984 and engine size increased to 981 cc (59.9 cu in) resulting in the renamed XV1000. In 1986, engine size was again increased to 1,063 cc (64.9 cu in), resulting in the renamed XV1100.

This model was discontinued in 2000 as the "Star" range of motorcycles took over as the cruiser line from Yamaha. The DragStar 1100 is often seen as the successor to the XV1100.

== Starter problems ==
According to Motorcyclist magazine, the early Virago has a design flaw in the starter system. This magazine states that the starter's defect exists in early Virago models (1982 and 1983). However, the same flawed starter system was installed in the early (1984–85) XV700, which was produced until 1987, and the XV920. The XV1000 had an improved system since it began production in 1984, which doesn't present the flaws. Also the XV1100, XV700 and the XV750 (1986 and up) do not present the starter system flaws found in the earlier Viragos.

Motorcyclist Magazine suggested welding the ring gear to its backing plate to solve the problem. Other solutions commonly used are the use of shims, which was Yamaha's proposed solution, then also the use of a newly designed idler gear. None of these solutions are considered or proved to be permanent, and applying only one of them will not address other existing flaws in the system; however, great improvements have been reported by Virago owners that have applied them.

== See also ==
- Yamaha Virago
- Yamaha Virago 535
- Yamaha Virago 750
- Yamaha DragStar 1100
