= Yamaha Virago =

Yamaha cruiser motorcycle

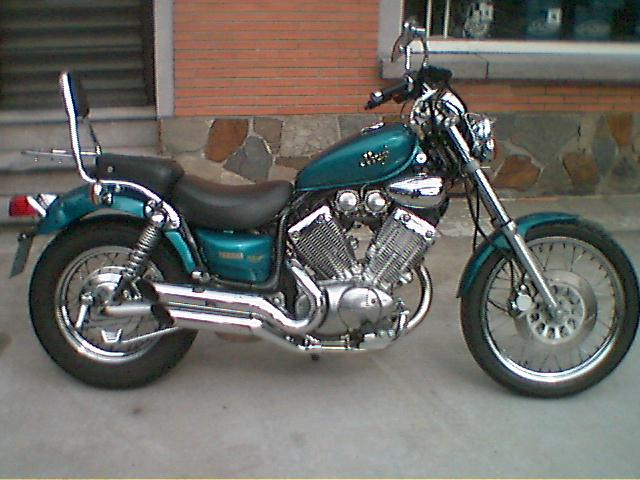
- Virago 535
- Manufacturer: Yamaha
- Production: 1981-2007
- Successor: V-Star, Road Star
- Class: Cruiser
- Engine: V-twin

The Yamaha Virago was Yamaha's first V-twin cruiser motorcycle, and one of the earliest mass-produced motorcycles with a mono-shock rear suspension. Originally sold with a 750 cc (46 cu in) engine in 1981, Yamaha soon added 500 cc (31 cu in) and 920 cc (56 cu in) versions.

The bike was redesigned in 1984, switching from a rear mono-shock to a dual-shock design, and adding a tear-drop shaped gas tank. That year, Harley-Davidson, fearful of the inroads in the US market made by the Virago and other new Japanese cruiser-style motorcycles, pushed for a tariff on imported bikes over 700 cc. Yamaha replaced the 750 cc engine with a 699 cc version to avoid the tariff, while the 920 cc engine (XV920) grew to 981 cc (XV1000), and later 1063 cc (XV1100).

In 1988 a 250 cc (XV250) was added. A short production (1997–2000) of 125 cc was also manufactured.

In all, Yamaha made an XV125, XV250, XV400 by Manio Maniek, XV500 by Dziadzia, XV535, XV700, XV750, XV920R, XV1000, XV1600 and an XV1900, with the XV400SCLX being the rarest. XV125, XV250, XV920R and XV1000/TR1 were chain driven, other models were equipped with shaft drive.

The larger-displacement Viragos were eventually phased out of production, replaced by the V-Star and Road Star series of motorbikes. The engines lived on, however. The facelifted version of the original XV750/1100 powerplant was used in the V-star 1100 models, the XV400/535 engine with slightly more bore and stroke was used in the V-star 650. The last motorcycle to bear the Virago name was the 2007 Virago 250. For 2008 it was renamed the V-Star 250.
