= Gladiolus (disambiguation) =

Gladiolus (plural gladioli) is a genus of perennial flowering plants in the iris family.

Gladiolus may also refer to:

- Gladiolus, the body of the sternum
- Gladiolus, a 1992 card game by Society of Ancients
- Gladiolus Amicitia, a character in Final Fantasy XV
- "Gladiolus", a song from Darling in the Franxx Original Soundtrack Volume 3
- "Gladiolus", a song by Every Little Thing from the 2008 album Door
- HMS Gladiolus, the name of two Royal Navy ships
  - Gladiolus-class corvette
- USS Gladiolus, an 1864 Union Navy steamship

== See also ==
- Gladiola (disambiguation)
- Gladius (disambiguation)
- Gladiator (disambiguation)
- Gladiatrix (disambiguation)
- List of Gladiolus cultivars
