= Gladiator (disambiguation) =

A gladiator was an armed combatant entertainer in the Roman Republic and Roman Empire.

Gladiator(s) or The Gladiator(s) may also refer to:

== Arts and entertainment ==
=== Fictional characters ===
- Gladiator (Kallark), in Marvel Comics
- Gladiator (Melvin Potter), in Marvel Comics

=== Film ===
- The Gladiator (1938 film), a comedy adaptation of the 1930 Philip Wylie novel
- The Gladiators (1969 film), a Swedish drama/science fiction film by Peter Watkins
- The Gladiator (1986 film), an American TV movie
- Gladiator (1992 film), a boxing drama film with Cuba Gooding Jr.
  - Gladiator (1992 soundtrack)
- Gladiator (2000 film), Ridley Scott's epic historical action film with Russell Crowe
  - Gladiator (2000 soundtrack)
- Gladiator II (2024 film), Ridley Scott's sequel to Gladiator (2000)

=== Television ===
==== Episodes ====
- "Gladiator", Cardfight!! Vanguard (2011) episode 54 (2012)
- "Gladiator", FBI: Most Wanted season 3, episode 7 (2021)
- "Gladiator", First Wave season 2, episode 18 (2000)
- "Gladiator", Hercules: The Legendary Journeys season 1, episode 10 (1995)
- "Gladiator", Kaamelott season 1, episode 84 (2005)
- "Gladiator", Medical Center season 4, episode 12 (1972)
- "Gladiator", Mr Benn episode 14 (2005)
- "Gladiator", The Red Green Show season 11, episode 2 (2001)
- "Gladiator", Shaabiat Al Cartoon season 7, episode 12 (2012)
- "Gladiator", Something Is Out There episode 1 (1988)
- "Gladiators", Animal Kingdom season 5, episode 8 (2021)
- "Gladiators", Ellen season 2, episode 19 (1965)
- "Gladiators", Growing Up Gotti season 3, episode 3 (2005)
- "Gladiators", Hero: 108 season 2, episode 19b (2012)
- "Gladiators", Hot Wheels: Battle Force 5 season 1, episode 22 (2010)
- "Gladiators", Shaman King (2001) episode 49 (2002)
- "Gladiators", The New Legends of Monkey season 2, episode 6 (2020)
- "Gladiators", Voltron: The Third Dimension season 2, episode 3 (1999)
- "Gladiators", Warrior Challenge episode 4 (2003)
- "The Gladiator", Plebs series 1, episode 2 (2013)
- "The Gladiator", Super Crooks episode 6 (2021)
- "The Gladiators", Blondie (1968) episode 4 (1968)
- "The Gladiators", Have Gun – Will Travel season 3, episode 27 (1960)
- "The Gladiators", Land of the Lost (1991) season 2, episode 4 (1992)
- "The Gladiators", Mr. Lucky episode 20 (1960)
- "The Gladiators", Planet of the Apes episode 2 (1974)
- "The Gladiators", The Donna Reed Show season 8, episode 11 (1965)
- "The Gladiators", The New Avengers series 2, episode 12 (1977)
- "The Gladiators", The New Leave It to Beaver season 1, episode 6 (1985)

==== Series ====
- Gladiators (franchise), a sports entertainment television show
  - American Gladiators (1989 TV series)
  - American Gladiators (2008 TV series)
  - American Gladiators (2026 TV series)
  - Gladiators 2000, a children's adaptation of American Gladiators
  - Gladiators: Train 2 Win, a children's spin-off of the British series
  - Gladiators (1992 British TV series)
  - Gladiators (2008 British TV series)
  - Gladiators (2024 British TV series)
  - Gladiators (1995 Australian TV series)
  - Gladiators (2008 Australian TV series)
  - Gladiators (2024 Australian TV series)
  - MTN Gladiators, the South African version

=== Gaming ===
- Gladiator (board wargame), a 1979 board wargame by Battleline Publications
- Gladiator 1984, a 1984 arcade game by SNK
- Gladiator (1985 video game), a home computer game by Domark
- Gladiator (1986 video game), an arcade game by Taito
- The Gladiators: Galactic Circus Games, a 2002 video game
- The Gladiator, a 2003 arcade game by IGS, see List of arcade video games
- Gladiator: Sword of Vengeance, a 2003 video game
- Gladiator: Road to Freedom, a 2005 video game
- Gladiator A.D., a video game known later as Tournament of Legends

=== Literature ===
- Gladiator (novel), by Philip Wylie, 1930
- Gladiator (novel series), by Simon Scarrow
- The Gladiator (Scarrow novel), 2009
- The Gladiator (Turtledove novel), by Harry Turtledove, 2007
- The Gladiators (novel), by Arthur Koestler, 1939
- The Gladiators, an 1863 novel by George Whyte-Melville

=== Theatre ===
- The Gladiator (play), by Robert Montgomery Bird, premiered 1831

=== Music ===
- The Gladiators (band), a Jamaican roots reggae band
- Gladiator (band), a Slovak rock band, winner of the 8th ZAI Awards for vocal artist or ensemble

==== Albums ====
- Gladiator, a 2000 album by Unlord
- Gladiator (2000 soundtrack)
- Gladiator (1992 soundtrack)

==== Songs ====
- "The Gladiator March", by John Philip Sousa, 1886
- "Gladiator" (Dami Im song), 2014
- "Gladiator" (Jann song) 2022
- "Gladiator", a song by Nicola Roberts from the 2011 album Cinderella's Eyes
- "Gladiator", a 1992 song by The Jesus Lizard
- "Gladiators", a song by Janani K. Jha from the 2024 album The Rest of the Laurels

== Sports ==
- A.S.D. S.F. Gladiator 1912, an Italian football club
- Cleveland Gladiators, an American arena football team
- Quetta Gladiators, a Pakistani cricket franchise
- Dhaka Gladiators, a Bangladeshi cricket franchise
- Atlanta Gladiators, an American hockey team
- Louie Tillet, a French wrestler with the ring name "The Gladiator"
- Mike Awesome, an American wrestler with ring name "The Gladiator"
- Ricky Hunter, a Canadian masked wrestler with ring name "The Gladiator"
- Omar Atlas, a retired Venezuelan professional wrestler with the ring name "Super Gladiator"
- "The Gladiators" (photograph), a notable Australian rugby league photograph
- Los Angeles Gladiators, an American esports team in the Overwatch League
- Los Súper Gladiadores, professional wrestling tag team from XWF
- Golden Gate Gladiators, South Africa field hockey club

== Transportation and military ==
- Gladiator Cycle Company, a French manufacturer of bicycles, motorcycles and cars 1891–1920
- Gladiator tactical unmanned ground vehicle, an American unmanned vehicle
- Gloster Gladiator, a British biplane fighter aircraft designed in the 1930s
- Gladiator, the planned in-service name of the cancelled British MBT-80 tank project
- HMS Gladiator, the name of several ships of the Royal Navy
- Jeep Gladiator, the name of two pickup trucks
- USS Gladiator, the name of several U.S. Navy ships
- Yamaha Gladiator, a motorcycle
- SA-12 Gladiator/Giant (S-300V "Antey-300"), a Soviet surface-to-air missile system

== Other uses ==
- Gladiator (energy drink), a Mexican drink
- Gladiators motorcycle club, an American military motorcycle club
- Mantophasmatidae, carnivorous insects known as gladiators
- 68th Armoured Regiment (India), nicknamed The Gladiators
- Roman Gladiator (sculpture), an 1881 bronze sculpture by Georges Geefs

== See also ==
- Gladiatrix (disambiguation)
- Gladius (disambiguation)
- Gladiator War, the Roman slave uprising led by Spartacus
