= Gladius (disambiguation) =

A gladius (Latin, 'sword') is the primary sword of Ancient Roman foot soldiers.

Gladius may also refer to:

- Gladius (cephalopod), a hard internal bodypart found in certain cephalopods
- Gladius (gastropod), a synonym for a genus of molluscs
- Gladius (video game), a tactical role-playing video game
- Suzuki SFV650 Gladius, a motorcycle
- Gladius, a fictional character in One Piece
- Gladius LLC, a film production company founded by Heri Martínez de Dios
- Warhammer 40,000: Gladius – Relics of War, a 2018 strategy video game

== See also ==
- Gladiolus (disambiguation)
- Gladiator (disambiguation)
- Gladiatrix (disambiguation)
- Gradius, a series of video games
