= Manuel Espinosa =

Manuel Espinosa may refer to:

- Manuel Espinosa Batista (1857–1919), Colombian pharmacist and politician
- Manuel Espinosa (Cuban exile) (died 1987)
- Manuel Espinosa Jara (1865–1920), Chilean politician
- Manuel Espinosa (painter) (1912–2006), Argentine painter.
- Manuel Espinosa Yglesias (1909–2000), Mexican banker and philanthropist
