= Manuel de Dios Unanue =

Cuban-born American journalist

- Born: January 4, 1943; Camagüey, Cuba
- Died: March 11, 1992 (aged 49); Queens, New York, U.S.
- Cause of death: Murder by firearm
- Resting place: Bayamón, Puerto Rico
- Citizenship: U.S.
- Education: Interamerican University of Puerto Rico (M.S.)
- Occupation: Journalist
- Employer(s): former editor-in-chief El Diario-La Prensa; editor magazines Cambio XXI and Crimen
- Notable work: Book Secrets Of The Medellin Cartel
- Partner: Girlfriend Vicky Sanchez
- Children: 1

Manuel de Dios Unanue (4 January 1943 – 11 March 1992) was a Cuban-born U.S. journalist, radio show host, anti-drug crusading editor of magazines Cambio XXI and Crimen, and editor-in-chief of El Diario La Prensa, New York City's largest Spanish-language daily newspaper.

He was murdered in Elmhurst, Queens, New York, on 11 March 1992, by alleged hitman Alejandro Wilson Mejia-Velez. His murder marked the first time a journalist on United States soil had been killed by Colombian drug traffickers.

== Early life and education ==
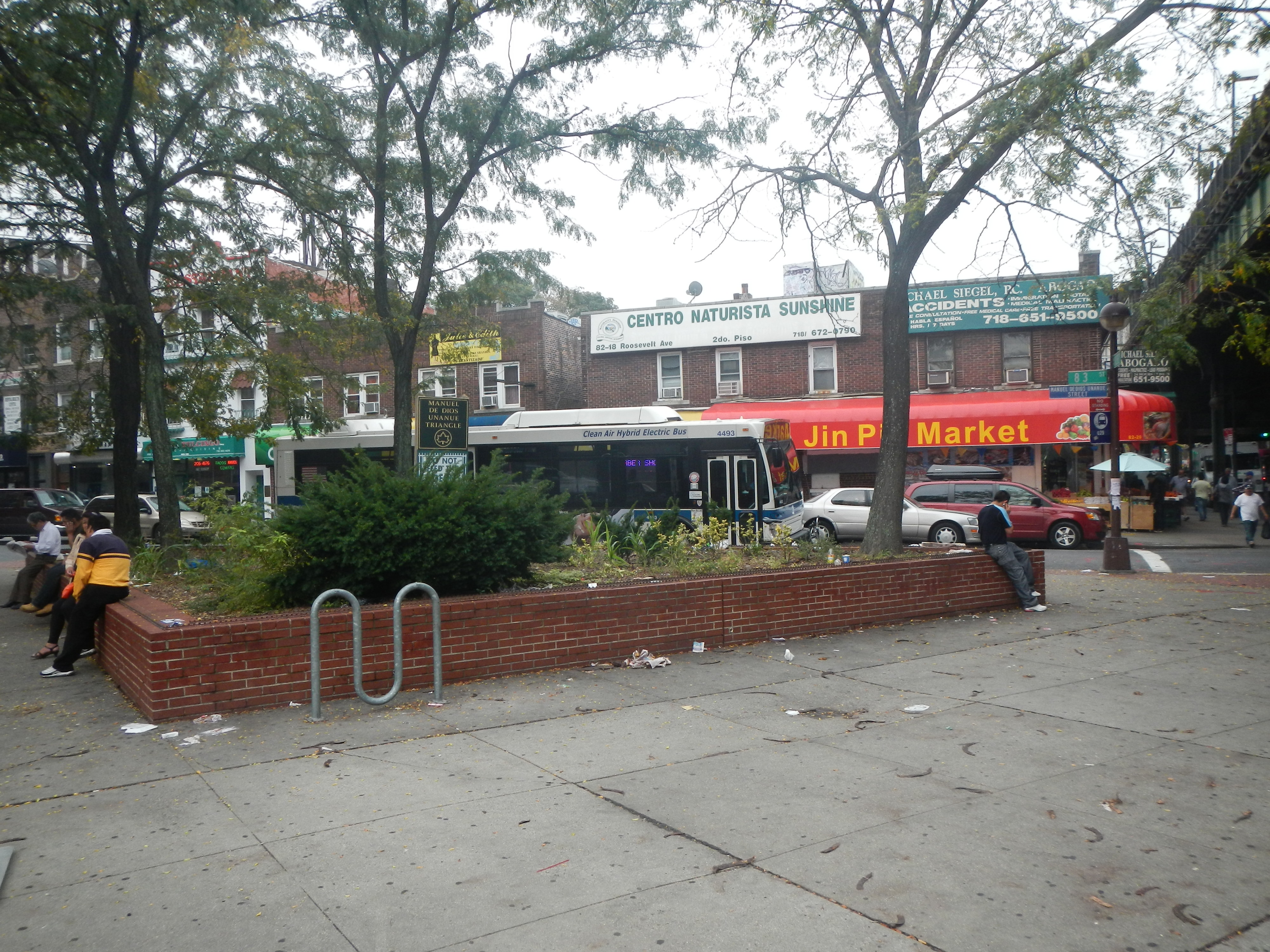
The Manuel de Dios Unanue Triangle, a public park in Elmhurst, Queens, dedicated to De Dios Unanue

Manuel de Dios Unanue was born in Camaguey, Cuba, on 4 January 1943. Along with his family, de Dios went into voluntary exile from Castro's Cuba, settling first in Spain, before emigrating to Puerto Rico in 1967.

De Dios received an M.S. in criminology from the Interamerican University of Puerto Rico in Puerto Rico before relocating to New York City in 1973. In November 1978, de Dios was part of a group of expatriates who participated in a controversial "dialogue" with Fidel Castro and other Cuban officials and became a member of its Committee of 75. "Dialogue" leader defector Rev. Manuel Espinosa accused de Dios of being a Castro "agent."

== Career ==
After arriving in New York City in 1973, de Dios went to work for the city's Hispanic Criminal Justice Task Force, which was chaired by Marco Antonio Rigau. In 1977, he joined the staff of El Diario-La Prensa, New York City's largest Spanish-language daily newspaper, first as a reporter, later as a columnist, then as editor-in-chief from 1984 to 1989. According to de Dios, he fell out of favor with his bosses at the newspaper in 1989 because of his unflattering coverage of then New York City Mayor Ed Koch and as a result he was let go. After leaving El Diario-La Prensa, de Dios hosted a radio show called "What Others Try To Silence," and he publicized alleged drug traffickers' names on the air. In 1988, de Dios published a book, The Secrets of the Medellin Cartel. He was also the founding editor of two magazines, Cambio XXI, and Crimen, which he published up to the time of his death, and in them he exposed the names of alleged drug dealers and published photos of their activities. "He was absolutely the most prominent American journalist to expose the cartels," said Rossana Rosado, El Diario-La Prensa's city editor.

== Death ==
On 11 March 1992, de Dios was sitting at the bar at the Meson Asturias Restaurant, in Queens, New York, when he was approached from behind and shot twice in the head by Wilson Alejandro Mejia-Velez. De Dios died instantly. Mejia-Velez was allegedly acting on orders given by Cali Cartel boss José Santacruz Londoño. New York Mayor David Dinkins posted a $10,000 reward, which was quickly raised to $70,000 by several media outlets at the urging of de Dios' colleagues.

De Dios was laid to rest 14 March 1992, at Cementerio Los Cipreses in Bayamón, Puerto Rico, and was survived by his mother, three sisters (one of them Dr. Teresa de Dios Unanue, a notable educator and President of Atlantic University College in Guaynabo, Puerto Rico) and a brother, as well as his girlfriend and business partner Vicky Sanchez, and their 2-year-old daughter Melody.

== Aftermath ==
Mentioned locations within Queens, New York City.

On 5 May 1993, federal prosecutors in U.S. District Court in Brooklyn charged John Mena, age 24, with arranging de Dios' murder on behalf of the Cali cartel; they also charged Alejandro Wilson Mejia-Velez, age 18, with being the shooter. At a news conference afterward, government officials stressed that the murder investigation had been given the same attention as one that might involve the murder of a police officer. "Any murder is obviously a heinous crime, but when the victim is murdered not for revenge or out of passion but because he has reported on the truth as he has found it," said U.S. Attorney Mary Jo White at the same news conference, "we all are very much the victims here." Other conspirators arrested for de Dios' murder were Juan Velasco, who turned informant and was given 15 years along with his wife Elizabeth Castano, who also cooperated and was given an 18-year sentence. Another conspirator, Guillermo Gaviria, remained a fugitive until his arrest in Colombia on 18 April 1999.

On 9 March 1994, Mejia-Velez, the only one of the conspirators to go before a jury, was convicted of killing de Dios. His conviction was based in large part on the testimony of Mena and two other conspirators, Elkin Farley Salazar and Jose James Benitez, who each received 18-year sentences in exchange for their testimony against Mejia-Velez. At Mejia-Velez's trial, prosecution witnesses identified a leader of the Cali cartel, José Santacruz Londoño, as the instigator of the plot. Londoño, however, was at large in Colombia and, due to extradition issues, could not be brought to the U.S. to stand trial for de Dios' murder even if found, according to deputy U.S. attorney Eric Friedberg. Co-conspirator and government informant John Mena avoided a possible life sentence and, on May 10, 1996, was given 18 years for his part in arranging de Dios' killing. Mena had earlier alleged it was Londoño who had ordered the hit on de Dios. Londoño was killed by Colombian police 5 March 1996, shortly after U.S. authorities made public its decision to withhold partial funding to Colombia's government due to that country's failure to prosecute more aggressively in its war on drug traffickers.

== Context ==
After de Dios' murder, the authorities determined that he was marked for death because of his reporting of the activities of the Cali cartel. "It looks like all the rules are off," said an unnamed detective involved in solving de Dios' killing. Londoño allegedly ordered the murder of de Dios because of the journalist's upcoming book, Partyloving Cali, which threatened to further expose the drug traffickers' activities, federal prosecutors asserted. Though the killing of anti-drug trafficking journalists was commonplace in Colombia, de Dios' murder was the first to be committed on U.S. soil. "Many of us are very shook up. We thought we were immune," said Miguel Perez, who was a friend of de Dios' as well as a fellow journalist and editor of the New York weekly Latino News. "The same tactics repeatedly used by Colombian cocaine traffickers in South America to silence their critics were used here and that is something we will not tolerate," proclaimed Queens District Attorney Richard A. Brown. New York City Mayor David N. Dinkins declared, "This [conviction] will serve as a reminder to those who would seek to silence our society's crusaders, to murder the illuminators of our society's dark places and to undermine one of our fundamental national rights should know we will never rest in pursuing them."

== Impact ==
"It seems to me he laid [down] his life for all society," said John Cardinal O'Connor to the 1,500 people who attended a memorial service for de Dios at St. Patrick's Cathedral.

In September 1998, the Manuel de Dios Unanue Journalism School, formerly M.S.142, opened at 610 Henry Street in Carroll Gardens, welcoming 120 sixth, seventh, and eighth grade students. The school was later merged with other schools in the district and moved to the John Jay High School building on Seventh Avenue in Manhattan.

On June 28, 1995, the New York City Council, at the urging of bill sponsor Councilman Guillermo Linares (D-Manhattan), voted unanimously to designate 83rd Street, between Baxter and Roosevelt Avenues, Manuel de Dios Unanue Street, expanding on a decision made, in March 1993, for New York City to set aside land on 83rd St as a park, designated the Manuel de Dios Unanue Triangle, in honor of de Dios.

== See also ==
- List of journalists killed in the United States
