= Alexandra Fernández Navarro =

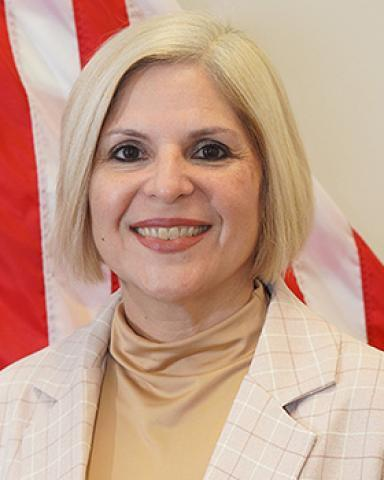

President of Atlantic University
- Incumbent
- Assumed office 2025

Alexandra Fernández Navarro is a Puerto Rican telecommunications lawyer and academic administrator serving as president of Atlantic University. She is an associate member of the Puerto Rico Public Service Regulatory Board and serves on the board of directors of FirstNet Authority.

== Career ==
Fernández Navarro began her professional career as a law clerk at the Supreme Court of Puerto Rico and has worked as an outside counsel for telecommunications providers at different law firms. She is authorized to practice law in Puerto Rico (2000); in the U.S. District Court for the District of Puerto Rico (2002), in the U.S. Court of Appeals for the First Circuit (2003) and in the State of Florida (2009). Fernandez Navarro has practiced law since 2001.

Fernández Navarro has been an alternate member of the Puerto Rico Permits and Land Use Review Board and spent ten years as a hearing examiner, legal advisor, and legal director at the Puerto Rico Telecommunications Regulatory Board (TRB). She was previously an associate member of the TRB, the state ESF-2 entity in charge of the restoration of telecommunications after an emergency, a position she held when Hurricane Maria struck Puerto Rico. Her recovery efforts included bringing together public and private stakeholders to create a dedicated telecommunications emergency operation center (EOC).

Fernández Navarro is an associate member of the Puerto Rico Public Service Regulatory Board, a public service commission that oversees energy, telecommunications, transportation, and other essential services in Puerto Rico. She also serves as a member of the Broadband Deployment Advisory Committee (BDAC) of the Federal Communications Commission (FCC), Puerto Rico’s State Broadband Leader representative at the National Telecommunications and Information Administration (NTIA), and a committee member with the National Association of Regulatory Utility Commissioners (NARUC). Announced on October 31, 2024, she is serving a second three-year term on the board of directors of FirstNet Authority (FirstNet Authority).

Fernández Navarro is president of Atlantic University.
