= American Gladiators =

American Gladiators may refer to:

- American Gladiators (1989 TV series), an American competition television program that aired from 1989 to 1996
- American Gladiators (2008 TV series), an American competition television program that aired in 2008
- American Gladiators (2026 TV series), an American competition television program that began airing in 2026 on Amazon Prime Video
- American Gladiators (video game), made in 1991 by Imagitec Design
- Gladiators (franchise), including the 1989 and 2008 TV series and the video game

== See also ==
- American (disambiguation)
- Gladiator (disambiguation)
- Gladiators 2000, children's edition of the 1989 show
