= Heri Martínez de Dios =

Cuban-born Puerto Rican businessman

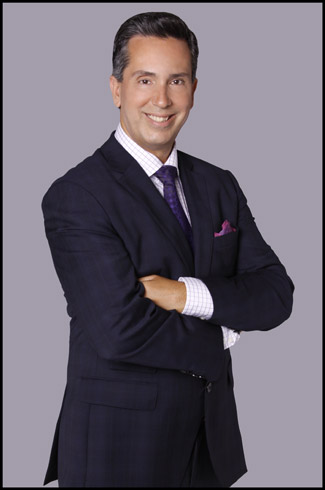
- Born: Camagüey, Cuba
- Education: BBA, MBA, MGA
- Alma mater: Walden University
- Title: Executive vice president and dean of Technology and Marketing at Atlantic University College and CEO and founder at Gladius LLC.
- Children: 2
- Website: atlanticu.edu and gladius.pr

Heri Martínez de Dios is the vice president and dean of Technology and Marketing at Atlantic University College (AUC). He is also the founder of Gladius LLC and is currently serving as its CEO.

== Early years ==
Heri Martínez de Dios was born in Camagüey, Cuba, and moved to Puerto Rico at the age of three. His mother is Dr Teresa de Dios Unanue, co-founder and President of Atlantic University College. His father, is the professor and accountant at Heriberto Martinez Abreu.

He attended Colegio Marista in Guaynabo. In 1987, he earned a bachelor's degree in Business Administration from an institution where he also completed six credits toward an advanced graduate course in Public Relations. He later obtained an MBA from the University of Phoenix in 1993 and a Master of Graphic Arts with a concentration in Digital Graphic Design from Atlantic University College in 2002. In 2005, he completed a PhD in Educational Technology at Capella University.

== Career ==
Martínez de Dios has worked at Gladius Studios for over 28 years. In 2007, he becameexecutive vice-president and dean of Technology and Marketing at Atlantic University College (AUC). In January 2014 he founded Gladius LLC., a studio producing digital animation, films, video games, and offering post-production services. The company's first short film was Phoebe & Luna. In 2015 he produced the television commercial for AUC, "El Gladiador en ti – 2015."

== Select awards ==
Martínez de Dios received three Emmy Awards nominations in 2011, an Emmy award for Technical Achievement in 2007, an Emmy Award in 2012, the Puerto Rico Manufacturers Association "Executive of the Year" award in 2014, the Zenit Award-Education Sector awarded by the Puerto Rico Chamber of Commerce in 2014, six awards from the Telly Awards for the film Phoebe & Luna, which he produced, and 6 Telly Awards for "El Gladiador en Ti 2015."

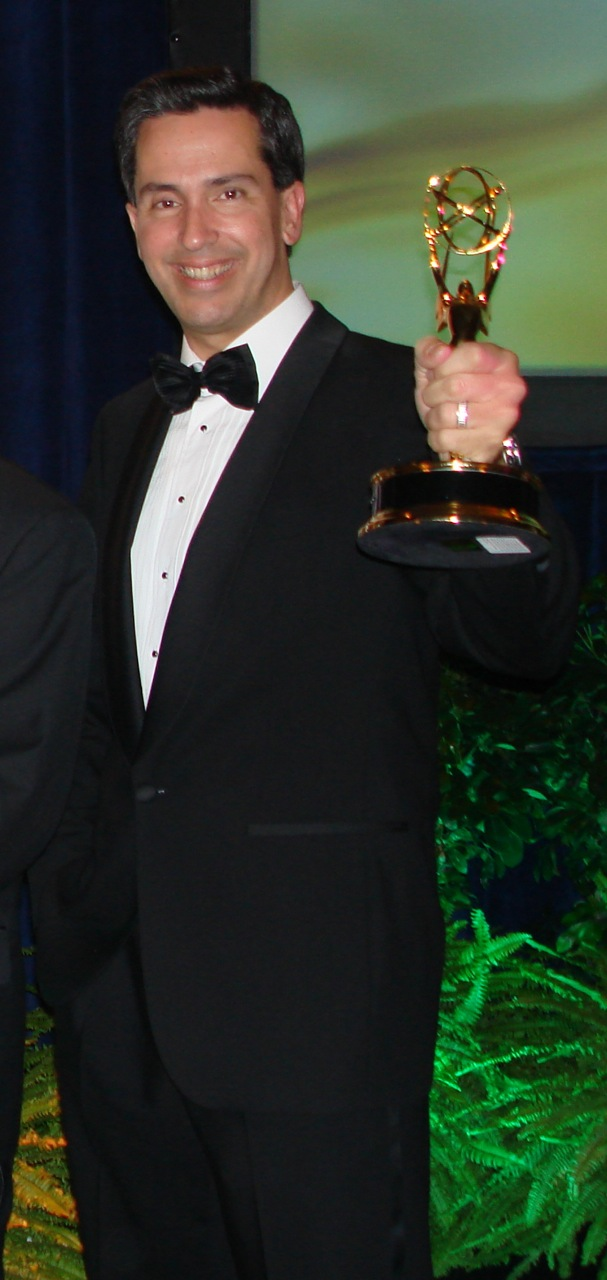
Heri Martinez with his Emmy at the 2007 ceremony

Named by UNESCO as its Young Educator of the Year in 1993, he was also recognized by Caribbean Business in its 2010 edition of "Executive Father", as well as being selected as one of the "Favorites" in the section titled "Magazine" of "El Nuevo Día" newspaper. Martínez de Dios has also published works on digital arts, Atlantic University College, and higher education. At Atlantic University College, he developed 29 art laboratories in the field of digital arts, including two laboratories for courses in digital animation, programming, and videogame design.

In 2014, Martínez de Dios, in collaboration with other resources of Atlantic University College, created the first Master of Science in Interactive Media Programming, first of its kind in Puerto Rico and the Caribbean. The Puerto Rico Manufacturers Association awarded him its Executive of the Year award in 2014. In 2015, Martinez de Dios was twice nominated for Emmy Awards for a commercial he produced for Atlantic University College and a short film, Phoebe & Luna. The commercial won two of the three categories in which it was nominated. In 2015 he received a Proclamation of Greeting by the House of Representatives of Puerto Rico, for the foundation of the studio Gladius LLC and the creation of dozens of jobs on the island of Puerto Rico. In January 2016, Martínez de Dios was also recognized by the Sales and Marketing Executives Association of Puerto Rico, who awarded him the "Top Management Awards 2016" in the category of education.
