= Gladiolus 'White Prosperity' =

Flowering plant cultivar

- Genus: Gladiolus
- Species: Gladiolus × gandavensis, or Gladiolus grandiflora L.
- Cultivar: 'White Prosperity'

Gladiolus 'White Prosperity' is a cultivar of 'Gladiolus' (Gladiolus grandiflora), it has large, pure white flowers with ruffled petals, blooming from mid to late summer.

It grows from corms and has sword-like leaves. It has flower spikes that can be from 90 cm, to 120 cm tall. They bloom in mid summer, between July–August.

The large flowers, are pure white, or snowy-white flowers, with ruffled petals, and dark pink streaks near the throat.

The tall flower spikes are often used in large flower arrangements, or exhibitions and in the garden borders.

It is grown in Europe and most states of the United States, and could be listed in 'top 12 of all time as a white cut flower'.

== See also ==
- List of Gladiolus varieties
