= Charming Beauty =

Flowering plant cultivar

Gladiolus 'Charming Beauty' is a cultivar of Gladiolus which features soft pink blossoms with a white throat. Its eye-catching flowers (up to 7 per stem) grow on loose spikes (2-3 spikes per corm) that are adorned by narrow, deep-green sword-shaped leaves. Blooming in early summer, this Gladiolus grows up to 20–30 inches (51–76 centimetres) tall.

== See also ==
- List of Gladiolus varieties
