= Gladiolus 'Atom' =

Flowering plant cultivar

- Genus: Gladiolus
- Cultivar: 'Atom'

Gladiolus 'Atom' is a cultivar of Gladiolus which was introduced in 1946. It is a small gladiolus up to 3 or 4 feet (1.2 m) tall with flowers of vermilion red with white edging.

== See also ==
- List of Gladiolus varieties
