= Princess Margaret Rose (gladiolus) =

Plant cultivar

Gladiolus 'Princess Margaret Rose'
- Genus: Gladiolus
- Hybrid parentage: Gladioli x hortulanus
- Cultivar: 'Princess Margaret Rose'

Gladiolus 'Princess Margaret Rose' is a cultivar of Gladiolus which features fiery hot colors, a mix of red, orange and yellow flowers. The ruffled blossoms are arranged closely and symmetrically on strong and erect spikes adorned by pointed sword-like leaves. Blooming in mid to late summer, between June and September, it can grow up to 36–48 inches (91–122 centimetres) tall.

It can be sited in sun or partial shade.

It was trialled at RHS Garden, Wisley in 1949.

== See also ==
- List of Gladiolus varieties
