= Purple King =

Purple King may refer to:

- a variety of green beans
- Purple King (Gladiolus variety), a variety of Gladiolus
