= Gladiolus 'Priscilla' =

Flowering plant cultivar

Gladiolus × gandavensis 'Priscilla'
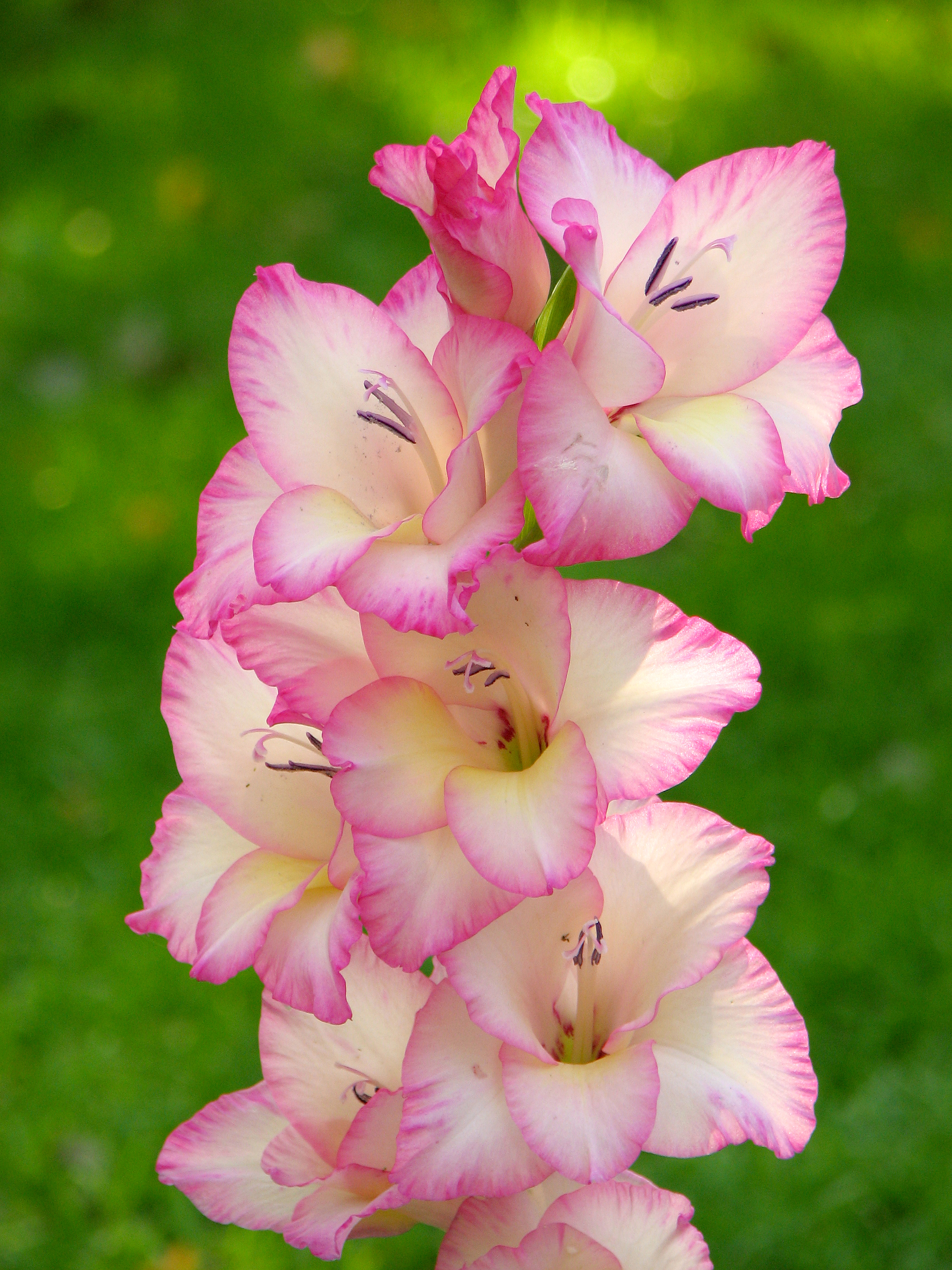
- Species: Gladiolus × gandavensis
- Cultivar: 'Priscilla'

Gladiolus 'Priscilla' is a cultivar of Gladiolus (Gladiolus x gandavensis, ) which has tri-colored flowers. They have a white ruffled flowers with pink edges, and a soft yellow throat. The florets (6 - 7 per stem) are arranged on strong and erect spikes adorned by pointed sword-like leaves. Blooming in mid to late summer, this Gladiolus grows up to 4–5 feet (120–150 centimetres) tall.

== Cultivation ==
This gladiolus is hardy to between USDA Zones 7 to 10. It can survive heavy rain.

In general they prefer to grow in full sun and have plenty of water during the growing season, but will still grow successfully in partial shade. They can be grown in pots or garden borders. The corms should be planted in spring and the young growth should be staked (to stop toppling over). In autumn, the corms should be lifted out of the soil, and then stored in a cool, dry and dark place until next spring.

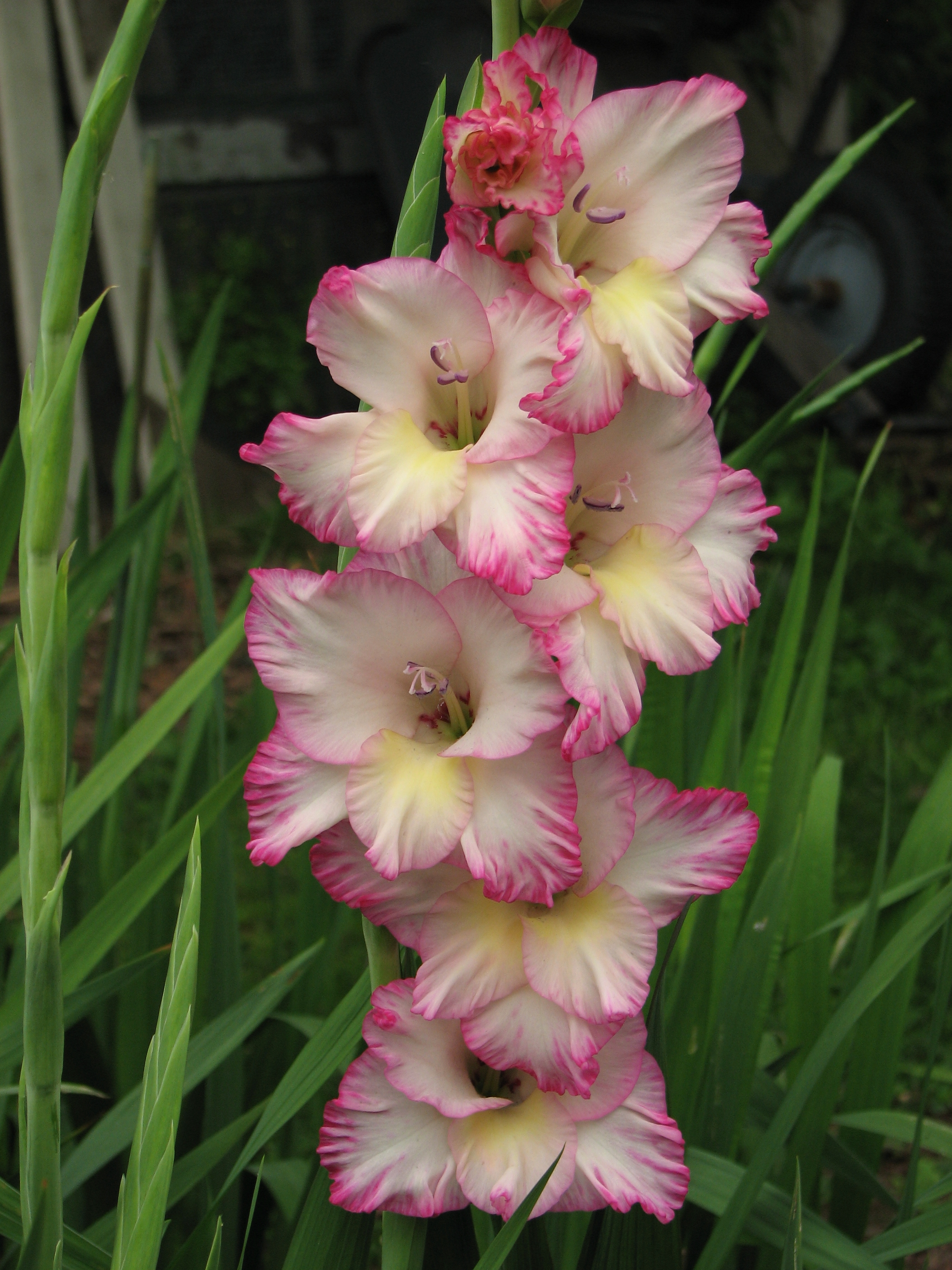

== Toxicity ==
This cultivar of gladiolus is toxic to dogs, cats, and horses.

== See also ==
- List of Gladiolus varieties
