= Teresa de Dios Unanue =

Puerto Rican writer and businesswoman

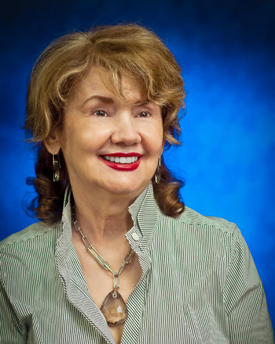
- Born: Camagüey, Cuba
- Other names: de Dios Unanue, Teresa; de Dios Unanue, Teresa, de Dios, Unanue
- Education: Ph.D. in Human Behavior
- Alma mater: University of Puerto Rico
- Title: President at Atlantic University College
- Website: atlanticu.edu

Dr. Teresa de Dios Unanue is an educator, civic leader, the author of several essays published in Puerto Rico and the United States, the co-author of the book Educación Personalizada (Personalized Education), and the co-founder and Executive President of Atlantic University College, a university institution specializing in digital arts in Puerto Rico and Caribbean.

== Early years ==
Dr. Teresa de Dios Unanue was born in Camagüey, Cuba. She was later exiled and settled in Puerto Rico, where she graduated with distinction from the University of Puerto Rico in the fields of literature, administration and educational supervision. She also has a doctoral degree in Human Behavior. Years later, after graduating from the university, she began to work as Director of Innovation and Curriculum at the American Military Academy. From there, she proceeded to found the company which she now directs. She is the sister of the late journalist Manuel de Dios Unanue whose murder in 1992 made international headlines.

== Co-founder of Atlantic University College ==
Dr. Teresa de Dios Unanue has dedicated her life to the development of Puerto Rican children and youths. In 1983, Dr. de Dios began her work developing Atlantic University College, the only university institution in Guaynabo, Puerto Rico. She is a co-founder of the college, and currently serves as its president. This university institution has been credited with strengthening the city's economy. Similarly, Atlantic University College is considered to be a pioneer in digital arts on the island. Another great success of Dr. de Dios was her establishment of the historic first bachelor's degree in graphic arts, and the incorporation into the college's curriculum, in 2001, of the first master's degree in graphic arts in Puerto Rico and the Caribbean which specializes in digital graphic design. Also, in 2014, the Master of Science in Interactive Technologies Programming

== Awards and accomplishments ==
Dr. de Dios's efforts, and her educational and administrative work, have transcended boundaries. Under her presidency, and together with the Executive Vice-president Heri Martínez de Dios, she has received recognition such as the award and rank of Honorary Institution with Distinction, awarded by the Accrediting Council for Independent Colleges and Schools (ACICS), and the prestigious Emmy Award in 2007 in the category of Technical Achievement, an Emmy ® Award in 2012 and nominated for three Emmy ® awards in 2011. It is worth noting that Atlantic University College, under the leadership of Dr. de Dios, is the only institution in Puerto Rico and the Caribbean which has received this award.

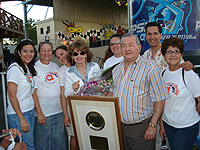
Teresa de Dios Unanue received the Distinguished Guaynabo Resident award from the city of Guaynabo, Puerto Rico

She also received the Kappan of the Year award for her voluntary work with disadvantaged youths in the Peruvian Republic School in the Luis Llorens Torres public housing project, as well as the Paloma de la Paz (Dove of Peace), Outstanding Businesswoman, and Distinguished Guaynabo Resident prizes, all awarded by the city of Guaynabo in recognition of her contribution to the development of culture and the arts in the city, and the Hero of Our Times prize awarded by Doral Financial Corporation for her work in the interest of the well-being of the Puerto Rican people. She has also been recognized by the newspaper Caribbean Business as one of the island's leading women in its reports 'Women in Leadership', 'Women Who Rule 2008' and 'Women Who Lead 2010', and has also been recognized by the Puerto Rican UNESCO organization for her services and work, and her contributions to culture.
In addition to this, on September 27, 2010, the President of the Senate of Puerto Rico, Thomas Rivera Schatz, together with former senate president Cherlie Rodríguez, dedicated a congratulatory motion to Dr. Teresa de Dios Unanue, in which her personal, academic and professional record was highlighted, as well as her achievements and contributions to higher education in Puerto Rico. In addition to her contributions as an educator, Dr. de Dios is a civic leader, essayist, and the co-author of the book Educación Personalizada (Personalized Education).

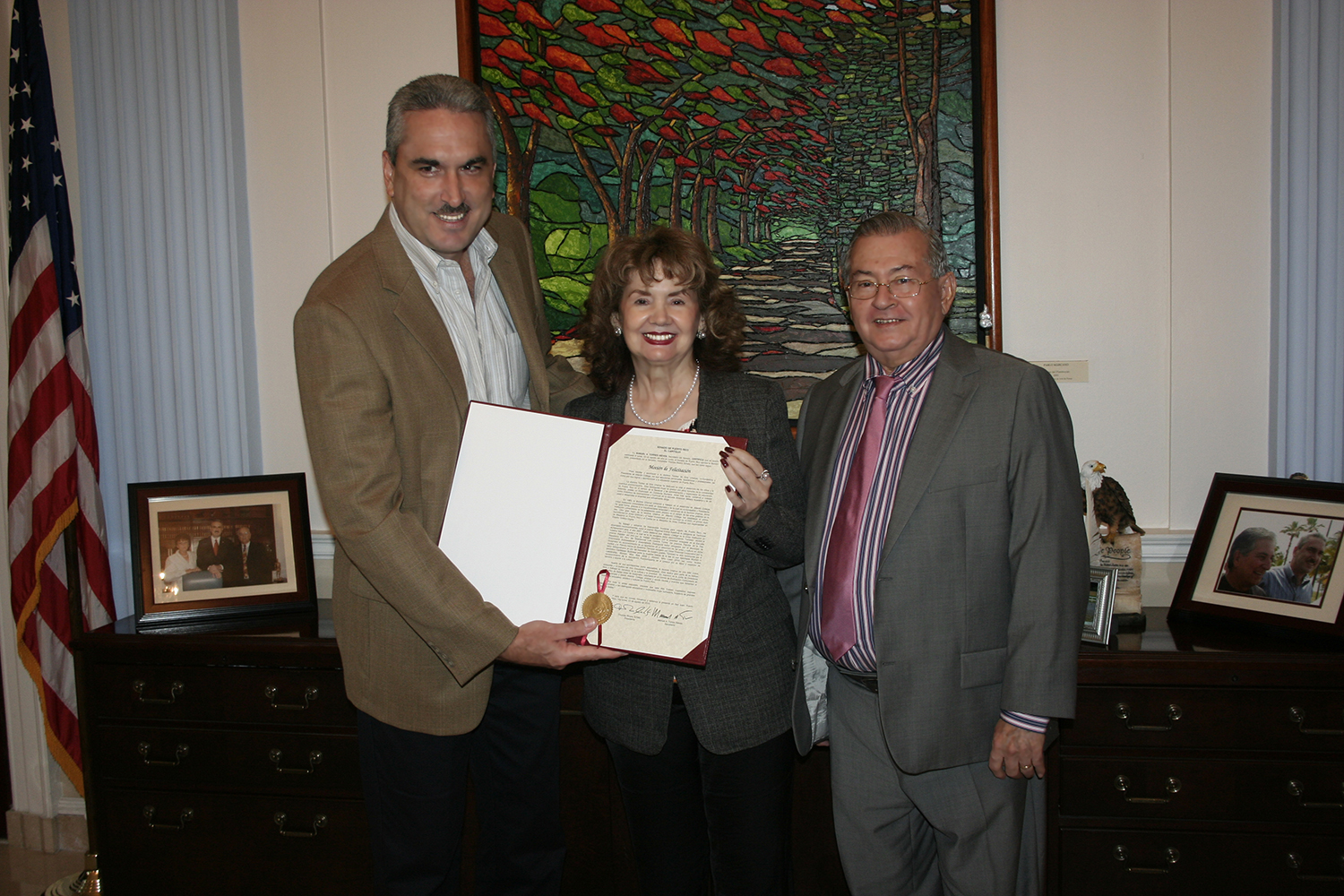
Teresa de Dios Unanue with her husband Professor Heriberto Martinez receive the recognition from the President of the Senate

== Philanthropy and community work ==
Dr. de Dios currently dedicates a large proportion of her time to work carried out in order to benefit culture and young people. She is a member of the board of directors of the Centre of Fine Arts in Guaynabo, Puerto Rico, and a volunteer on the city's Community Evaluation Committee. From Atlantic University College, she endorses and assists causes and events which support educational, artistic and cultural development in Puerto Rico.

== See also ==
- List of Puerto Ricans
