= Tugboat Emily B =

American ship

Emily B
History

United States
- Name: USS Gladiator
- Acquired: by charter, 20 August 1918
- Out of service: 20 December 1918
- Fate: Returned to owner

General characteristics
- Type: Commercial Tugboat

Tugboat Emily B was owned by the Wilmington Towing Company, Wilmington, North Carolina, and was loaned to the US Navy in 1918 for use as USS Gladiator during World War I. She was returned to her owners at the end of the war.
