= Rose Supreme =

Plant cultivar

Gladiolus 'Rose Supreme' is a cultivar of Gladiolus which is characterized by its large, pink flowers. Gladiolus cultivars are grown worldwide, with geographically-varying growing seasons; in India, this cultivar typically blooms in December and January. They bloom during the summer months in the British Isles.

The 'Rose Supreme' cultivar is noted for its particularly large florets compared to other Gladiolus cultivars. It may grow up to a maximum 1.5 metres (4.9 feet) tall.

== See also ==
- List of Gladiolus varieties
