= Suzuki SV650 =

Middle-weight motorcycle

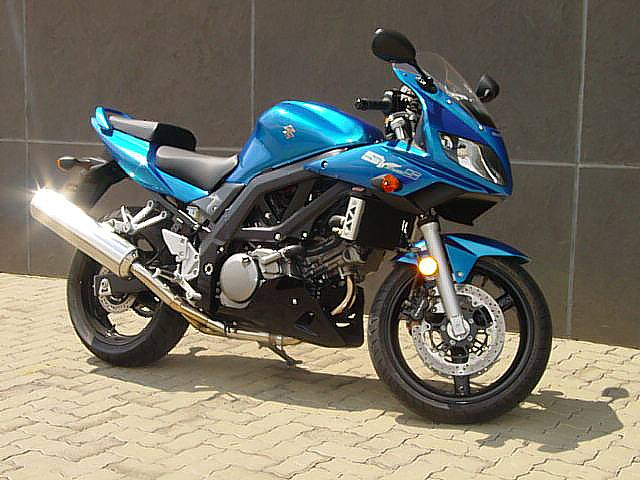
- 2006 Suzuki SV650S
- Manufacturer: Suzuki
- Also called: Suzuki SV-7S (2026–present)
- Production: 1999–2012; 2016–present
- Assembly: Japan: Hamamatsu
- Class: Standard (SV650); Sports (SV650S)

The Suzuki SV650 and its variants are street motorcycles manufactured since 1999 by Suzuki. In 2009, Suzuki replaced the standard SV650 with the SFV650 Gladius. In 2016, the Gladius name was discontinued and the 2017 model was reverted to SV650.

== First generation (1999–2002) ==
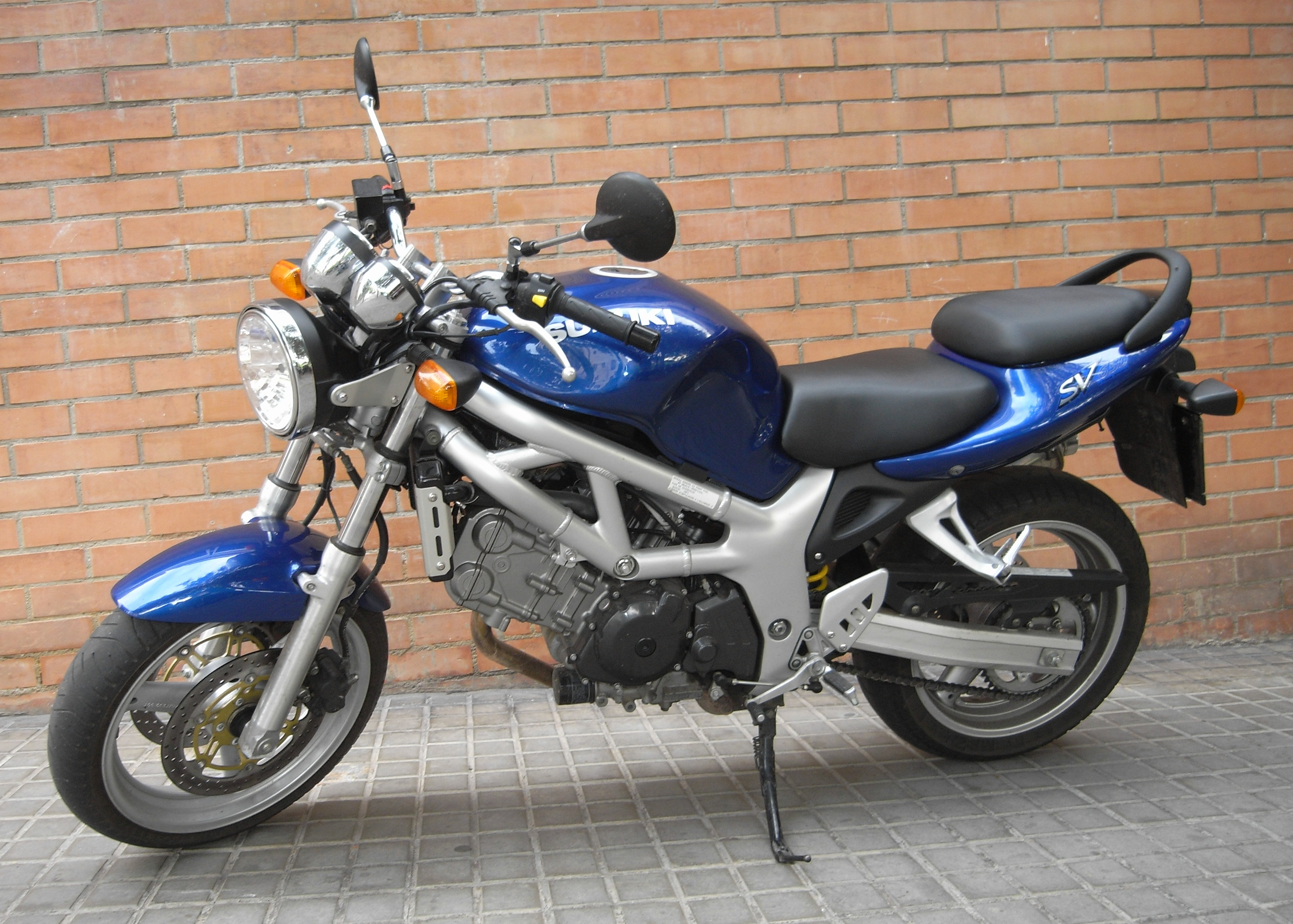
2002 Suzuki SV650

Suzuki introduced the SV650 in 1999 as a budget entry in the emerging naked bike market and featured both naked and half faired versions. The bike provided a sporty though easily manageable ride. The combination of light weight, rigid chassis, strong handling, and the V-twin's strong mid-range torque appealed to beginner and experienced riders alike. The 2003 SV1000 was marketed as a bigger alternative to the second generation SV650.

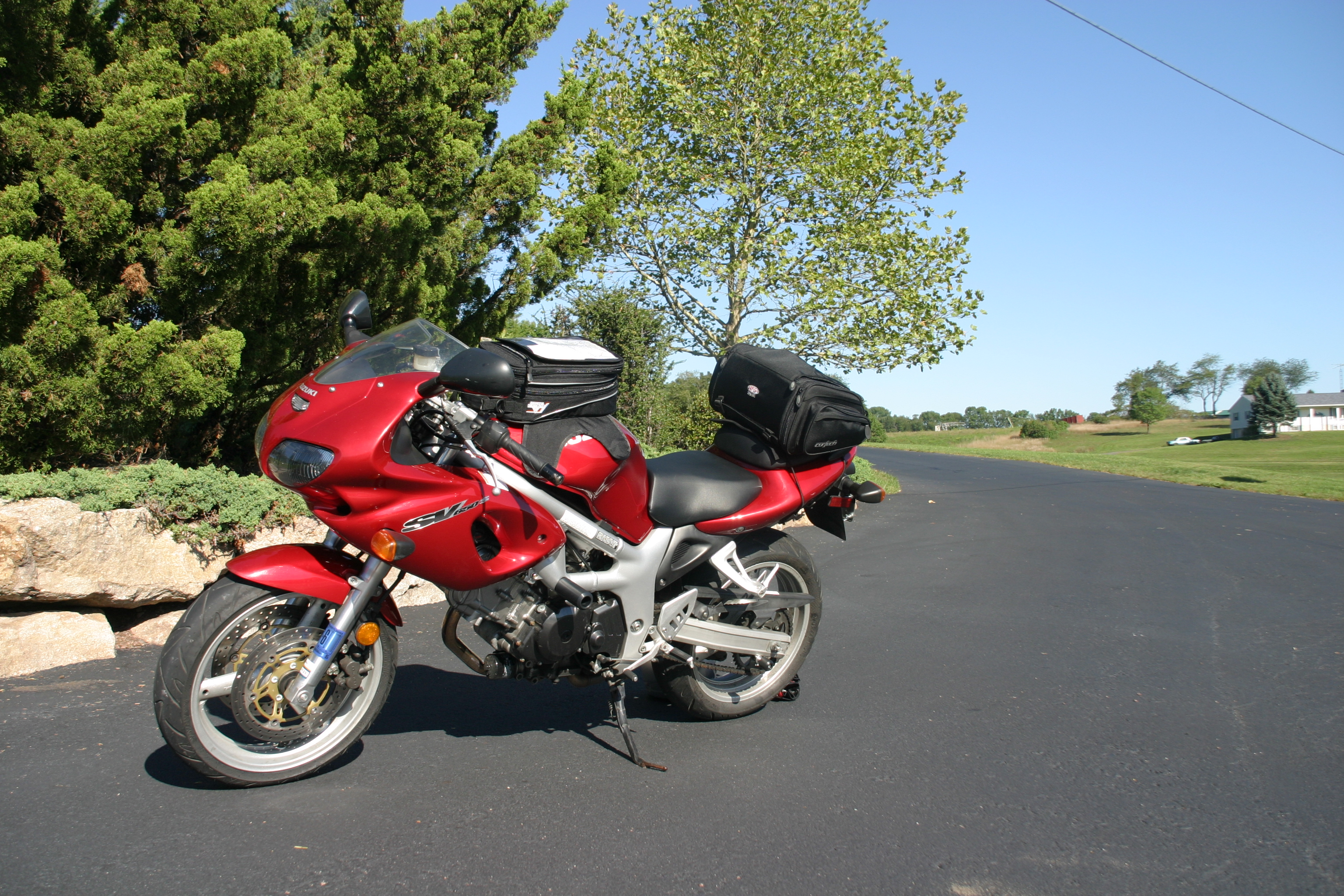
2001 Suzuki SV650S

The SV650 immediately became popular, but American buyers wanted the sportier 'S' version that featured lower handlebars, higher foot pegs and a bikini fairing and windscreen, available only in the European and Canadian markets. American magazines ran articles describing how to import it into the United States. In 2000, Suzuki began importing the SV650S to the USA.

The SV650 with its relatively low purchase price and excellent handling characteristics became popular with racers which prompted a rebirth of the "lightweight twins" racing classes across North America and the SV650 began outselling the Suzuki GS500, Honda NT650 and Kawasaki Ninja 500R, which previously populated the class.

== Second generation (2003–2008) ==
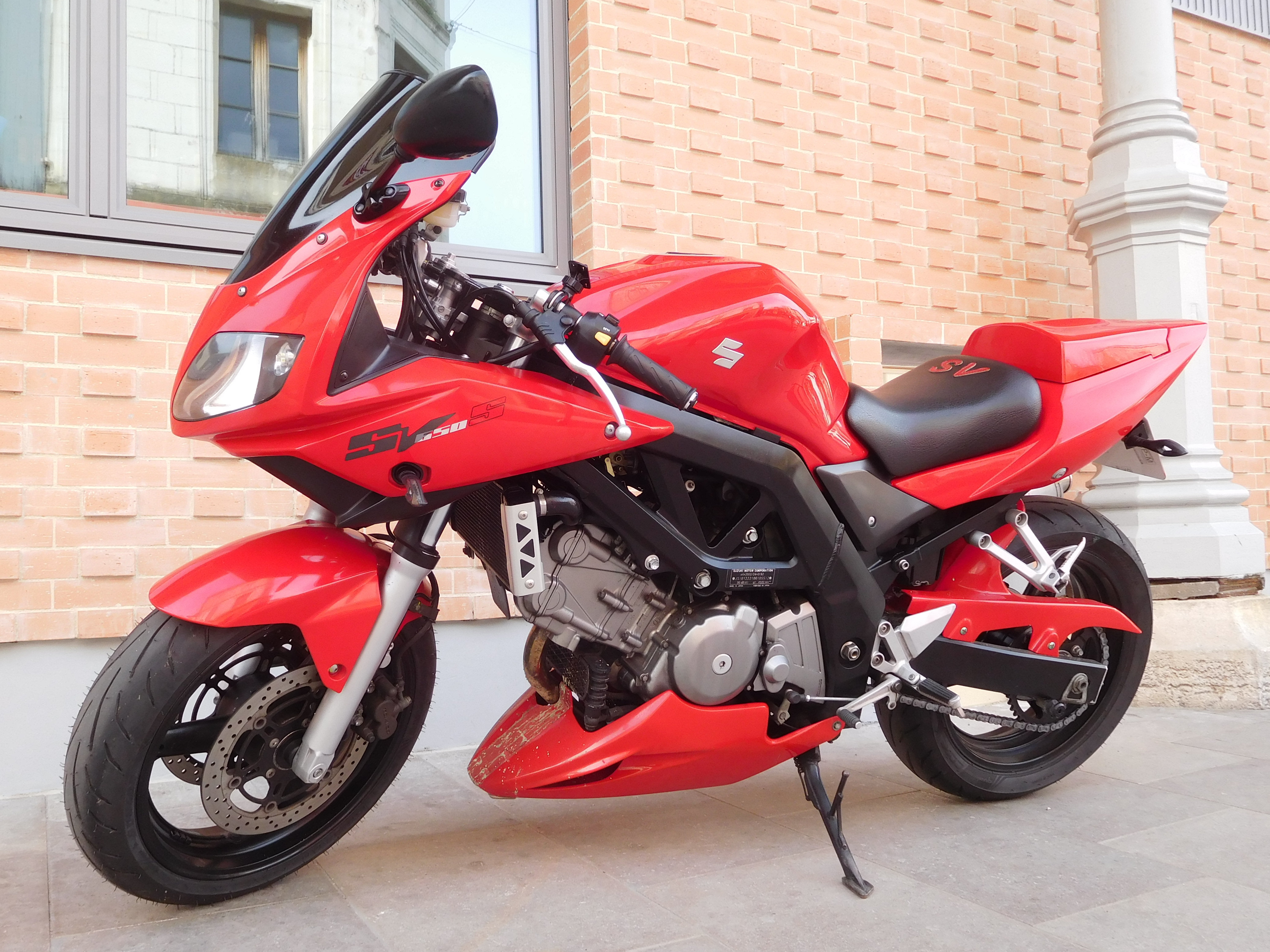
2003 Suzuki SV650S

In 2003, Suzuki redesigned the SV650 with a new pressure-cast aluminum truss frame, bodywork, swing-arm with revised rear brake caliper mounting, exhaust, digital speedometer display and electronic fuel injection/induction system to replace the carburetor.

The 2003 SV650s also supported some first generation parts (like the rearsets and radiator). The subframe is also angled up higher than 2004+ models. The different subframe has year-specific parts, such as the rider seat, plastic frame covers, exhaust hanger brackets and passenger pegs.

For 2004, Suzuki used a new, 40 mm lower subframe and a seat with a narrower design in the front. This made flat footing easier for shorter riders. The trail was raised by 2 mm, and the rear fender was restyled to clean up the area under the tail lights and provide more protection against flying debris.

In 2005, the color of the frame was changed from silver to a matte black finish and the radiator size was decreased from 440 to 410 mm (17 to 16 in).

For 2007, both SV650 and SV650S added dual spark plugs per cylinder, and an exhaust gas oxygen sensor on California models for reduced emissions. An anti-lock braking system (ABS) was also added as an option.

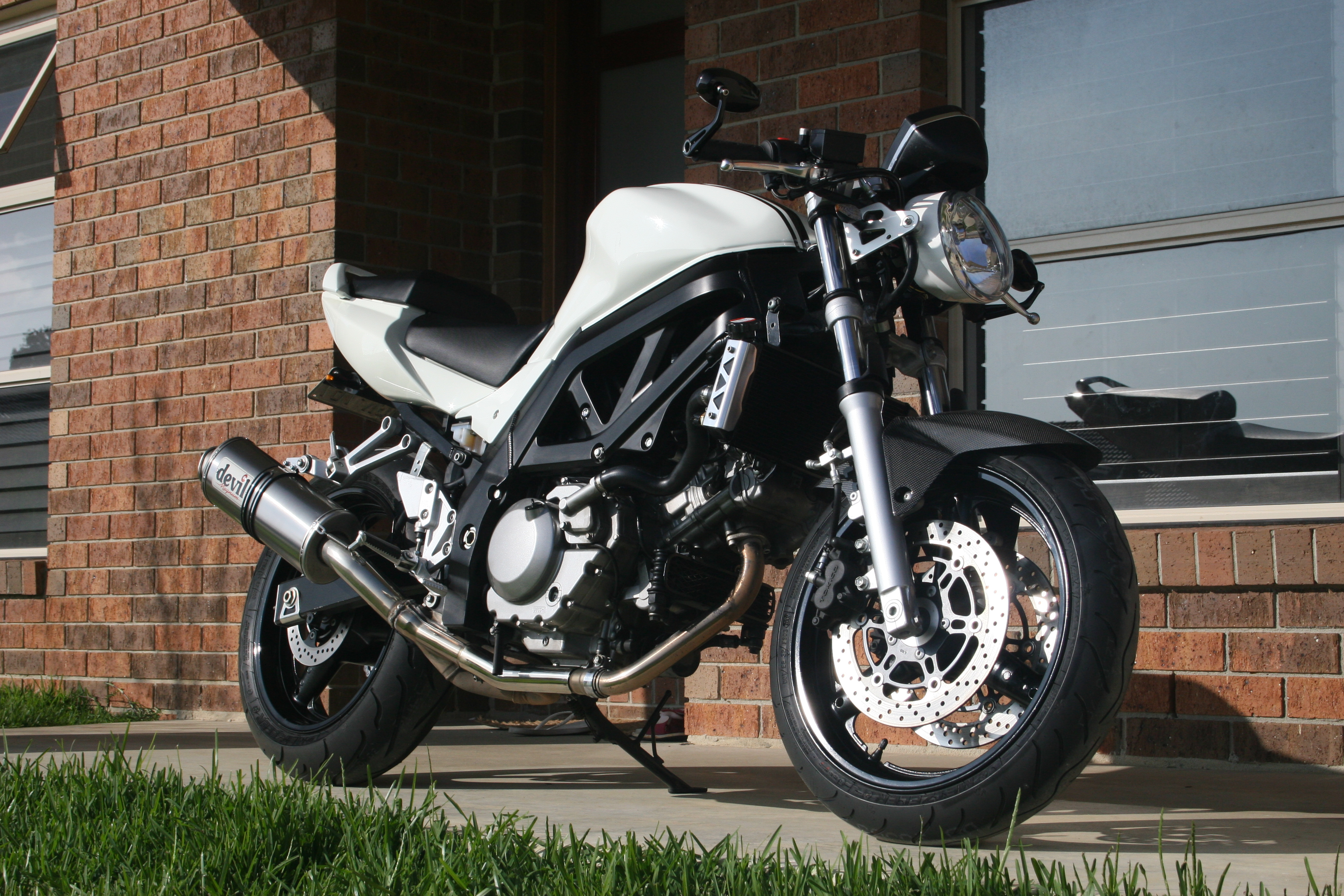
2008 SV650

For 2008, alongside the traditional SV650 and SV650S models, Suzuki offered a new SV650 Sport (UK) or SV650SF (US) model with a more traditional complete fairing. The SV650S was removed from the US market.

In September 2008, Suzuki Australia introduced the SV650SU, a de-tuned version of the SV650S, to augment their range of motorcycles that comply with the country's Learner Approved Motorcycle Scheme (LAMS).

== Gladius (2009–2013) ==
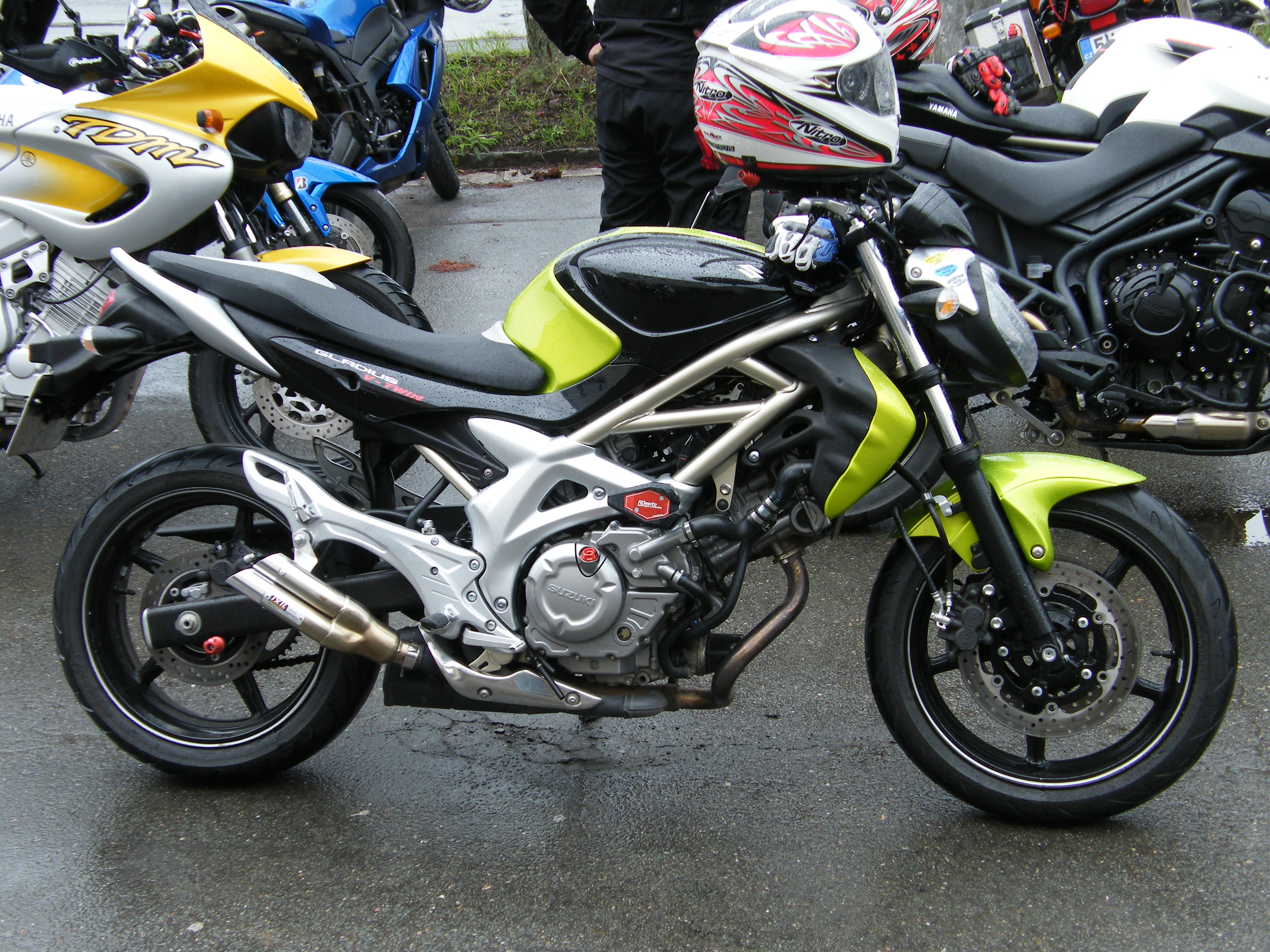
Suzuki Gladius

The 2009 Suzuki SFV650 Gladius replaced the SV650 naked version in the USA; however, a naked 2009 SV650 was available in Canada. Although the naked version was superseded by the Gladius, the SV650S model remained in the UK and Australian line-up through to 2012.

== Third generation (2017–2026) ==
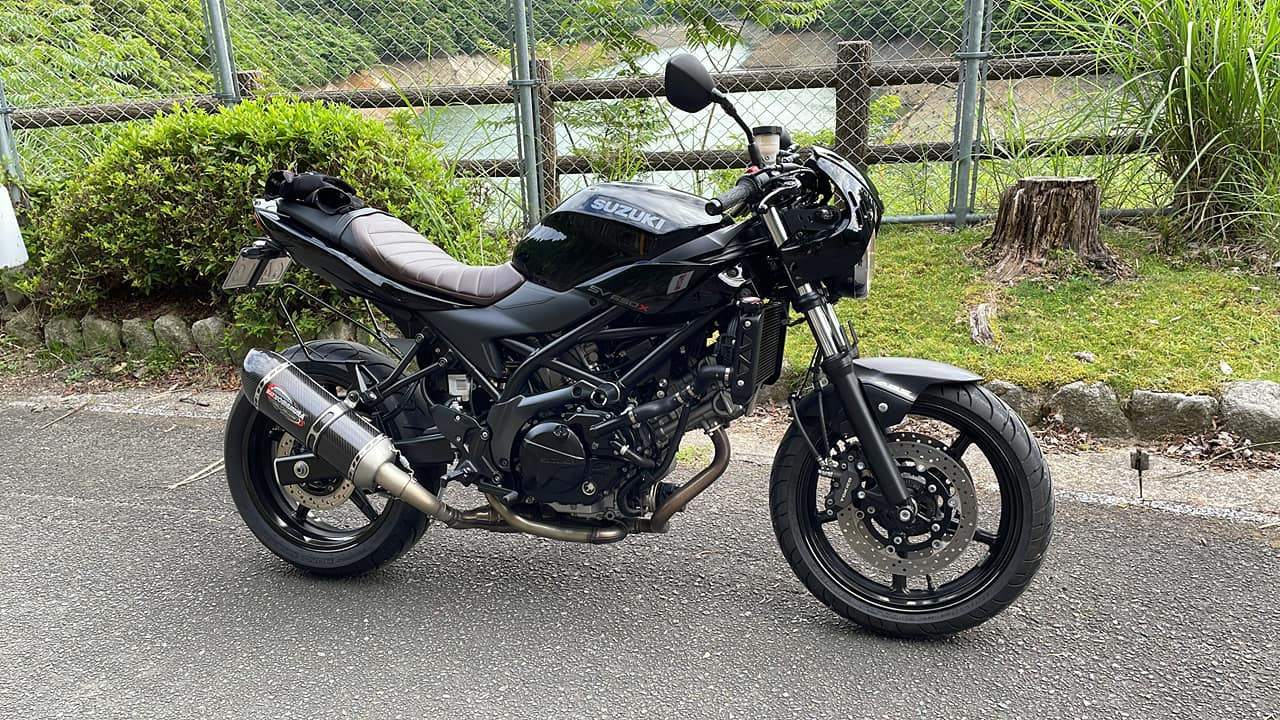
2021 Suzuki SV650X

The 2017 model released in 2016, SV650/A has returned to the more conventional styling of the pre-Gladius naked version. Suzuki claims the wet weight for the non-ABS model is 195 kg (430 lbs), and 197 kg (434 lbs) for the ABS model. Its engine develops an additional four-horsepower and features a low-speed stalling prevention system ("low RPM assist") to make the bike more suited to beginners and easier to ride in stop/go traffic.

It meets Euro 4 emission regulations and has a new slim steel frame. Seat height is 785 mm (30.9"). Fuel tank capacity is 13.8 litres, or 15.5 litres in the US market. It has twin front disc brakes and new 39 mm slimmer and lighter throttle bodies.

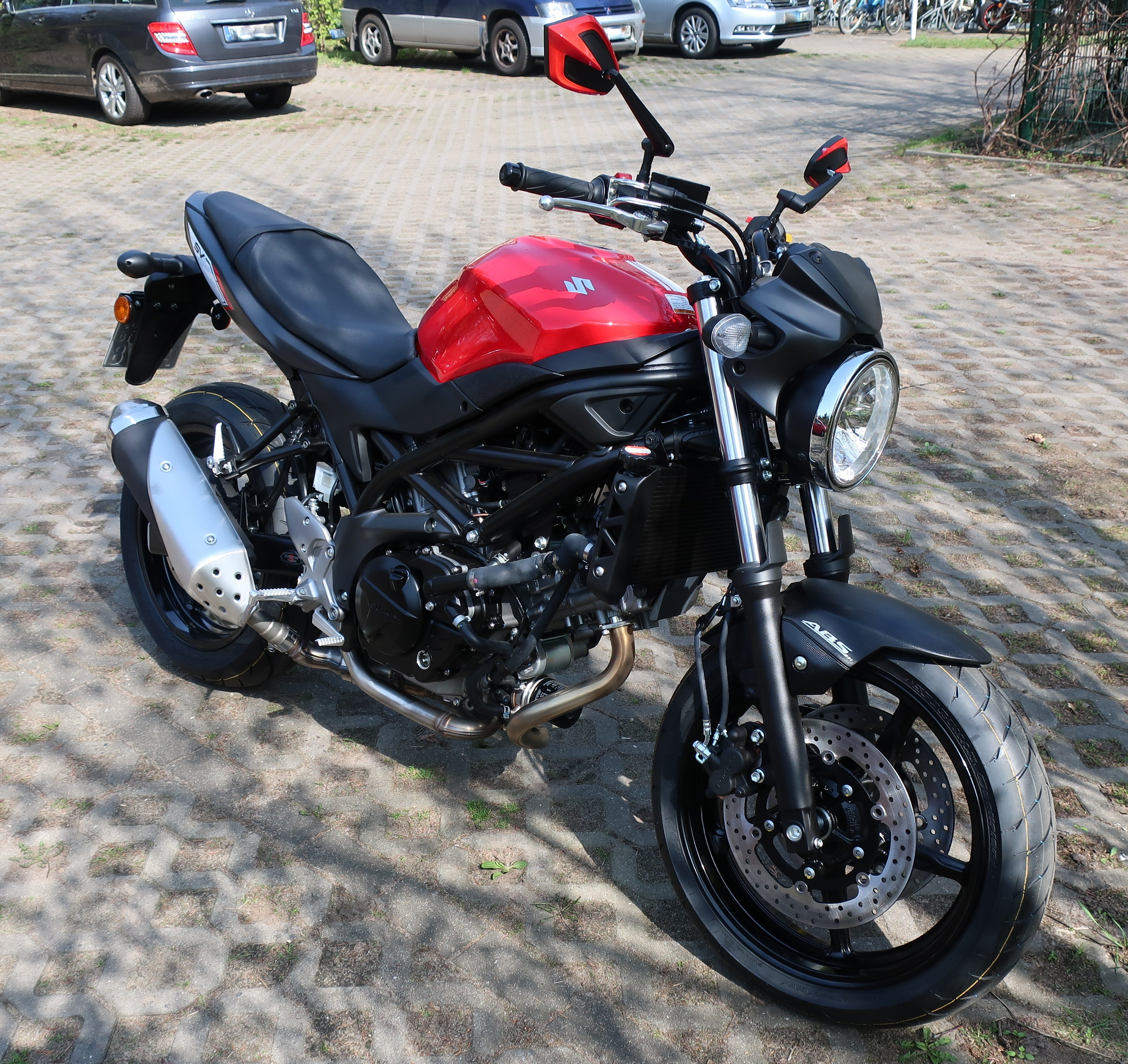
2017 Suzuki SV650A

In November 2015 Suzuki announced at EICMA 2015 that the SV650 would return in 2016 as a 2017-model year product. Preload adjusters are fitted to 2018 models. A cafe-racer version of the SV650 was launched in 2019 with a front pre-load adjustment.

== Fourth generation (2025—present) ==
In 2025, Suzuki revealed at the SV-7GX at EICMA in Milan. The model introduced ride-by-wire throttle bodies which enables a bi-directional quick shifter similar to the GSX-8R/8S models.

The SV-7GX model is aimed at the lightweight sports-touring market with a larger fuel capacity, updated electronics, and a more upright seating position. It is also fully Euro5+ compliant.

In late 2026, California Air Resource Board filings revealed that Suzuki planned to release an updated SV650 base model will be returning to the line up.

The regular SV-7S was unveiled in 2026.

== Current market situation ==
Other twin cylinder motorcycles in the class include the Yamaha MT07 / Yamaha XSR700 and Kawasaki Z650 / Kawasaki Ninja 650. The SV650 is more affordable than the likes of the Ducati Monster, Ducati Scrambler, and KTM 790 Duke, but has similar performance.

== Specifications ==
Model year	1999–2002	2003	2004–2006	2007	2008–2014	2017–present
Suzuki Year Codes	X ('99), Y ('00), K1, K2	K3	K4, K5, K6	K7	K8, K9, L0, L1, L2, L3, L4	
Suzuki Models	SV650 (naked) SV650S (half-fairing)	SV650 (naked) SV650S (half-fairing)	SV650 (naked) SV650S (half-fairing)	SV650 (naked) SV650A (ABS) SV650S (half-fairing) SV650SA (half-fair'd+ABS)	SV650 (naked) SV650A (ABS) SV650SF (full-fairing) SV650SA (full-fair'd+ABS)	SV650 SV650 ABS SV650X
Engine
Engine Type	645 cc (39.4 cu in) liquid-cooled 4-stroke 8-valve DOHC 90° V-twin; TSCC (Twin Swirl Combustion Chamber)			Added twin spark plugs per cylinder and O2 sensor for improved emissions		
Bore x stroke	81.0 mm × 62.6 mm (3.19 in × 2.46 in)					
Compression	11.5:1					11.2:1
Power	64.2 hp (47.9 kW) @ 9000 rpm	73.4 hp (54.7 kW) @ 8800 rpm (rear wheel)				74.9 hp (55.9 kW) @ 8500 rpm (claimed); 69.3 hp (51.7 kW) @ 8530 rpm (rear wheel)
Torque	42.3 lbf⋅ft (57.4 N⋅m) @ 7200 rpm	47.2 lbf⋅ft (64.0 N⋅m) @ 7000 rpm (rear wheel)				47 lb⋅ft (64 N⋅m)@ 8100 rpm (claimed); 44.2 lb⋅ft (59.9 N⋅m)@ 8000 rpm (rear wheel)
Fuel system	Mikuni BDSR39 x2	Fuel injection				
Ignition	Digital transistorized					
Chassis
Frame	Aluminium alloy oval tube trellis	Pressure cast aluminium alloy diamond truss				Steel trellis frame
Front suspension	Kayaba 41 mm telescopic fork, 132 mm (5.2 in) wheel travel. Non-adjustable (1999–2001). Adjustable pre-load (2002).	41 mm damping rod fork, 130 mm (5.1 in) travel. Adjustable pre-load.				41 mm telescopic fork, 125 mm (4.9 in) travel
Rake	25°					
Trail	100 mm (3.9 in)	102 mm (4.0 in) (naked), 100mm (3.9 in) (S, SF, SA)				
Rear suspension	Kayaba single shock, adjustable pre-load 127 mm (5.0 in) wheel travel 337 mm length. 9.1 kg/mm (510 lb/in) spring rate	KYB (formally Kayaba) single shock, adjustable pre-load 330 mm bolt-to-bolt length. 7.7 kg/mm (430 lb/in) spring rate				Link type single shock, 7-step adjustable pre-load, 130 mm (5.1 in) travel
Front brakes	Dual 290 mm floating discs					
Rear brakes	Single 240 mm disc					
ABS	—N/a			Optional		
Front tire	120/60-ZR17 MC (55W), tubeless					120/70ZR17M/C (58W), tubeless
Rear tire	160/60-ZR17 MC (69W), tubeless					
Dimensions						
Length	2045 mm (80.5 in)	2125 mm (83.7 in); 2130 mm (83.9 in) (S)	2080 mm (81.9 in); 2085 mm (82.1 in) (S)	2080 mm (81.9 in); 2085 mm (82.1 in) (S) 2120 mm (83.5 in) (A, SA)	2080 mm (81.9 in); 2085 mm (82.1 in) (SF) 2120 mm (83.5 in) (A, SA)	2140 mm (84.2 in.)
Width	740 mm (29.5 in)	745 mm (29.3 in); 730 mm (28.7 in) (S)	745 mm (29.3 in); 730 mm (28.7 in) (S)	745 mm (29.3 in) (naked, A); 730 mm (28.7 in) (S, SA)	745 mm (29.3 in) (naked, A); 730 mm (28.7 in) (SF, SA)	760 mm (29.9 in.)
Height	1130 mm (44.5 in)	1085 mm (42.7 in); 1175 mm (46.3 in) (S)	1085 mm (42.7 in); 1170 mm (46.1 in) (S)	1085 mm (42.7 in) (naked, A); 1170 mm (46.1 in) (S, SA)	1085 mm (42.7 in) (naked, A); 1170 mm (46.1 in) (SF, SA)	
Wheelbase	1420 mm (55.9 in)	1440 mm (56.7 in); 1430 mm (56.3 in) (S)	1440 mm (56.7" in); 1430 mm (56.3 in) (S)	1440 mm (56.7 in); 1430 mm (56.1 in) (S); 1470 mm (57.9 in) (A, SA)	1440 mm (56.7 in); 1430 mm (56.3 in) (S, SA); 1470 mm (57.9 in) (SF)	1445 mm (56.9 in.)
Seat height	805 mm (31.7 in)	800 mm (31.5 in)				785 mm (30.9in.)
Ground clearance	140 mm (5.5 in)	155 mm (6.1 in) (S)	150 mm (5.9 in); 155 mm (6.1 in) (S)	150 mm (5.9 in); 155 mm (6.1 in) (S, SA, SF)	150 mm (5.9 in); 155 mm (6.1 in) (SA, SF)	135 mm (5.3 in.)
Dry weight	165 kg (364 lbs) 169 kg (372 lbs) (S)	167 kg (368 lbs) 171 kg (376 lbs) (S)	165 kg (363 lbs) 169 kg (372 lbs) (S)	168 kg (370 lbs) 171 kg (376 lbs) (A) 172 kg (379 lbs) (S) 175 kg (385 lbs) (SA)	168 kg (370 lbs) 171 kg (376 lbs) (A) [not confirmed] (SF) [not confirmed] (SA)	
Wet weight	189 kg (417 lb)	198 kg (437 lb)				195 kg (429.9 lbs.) 197 kg (434.3 lbs.) (ABS)
Fuel capacity	16 L (3.5 imp gal; 4.2 US gal)15 L (3.3 imp gal; 4.0 US gal) (California)	17 L (3.7 imp gal; 4.5 US gal); 16 L (3.5 imp gal; 4.2 US gal) (California)				3.8 US gal (14.5 L) / 3.6 US gal (13.8 L) CA model
Oil capacity	Without filter change: 2.3 L (2.4 US qt), With filter change: 2.7 L (2.9 US qt), Overhaul: 3.1 L (3.3 US qt)					
Engine coolant capacity	1.6 L (1.7 US qt)	1.7 L (1.8 US qt)				
Drive-train
Primary reduction	34/71 (2.088)					
1st gear	32/13 (2.461)					
2nd gear	32/18 (1.777)					
3rd gear	29/21 (1.380)					
4th gear	27/24 (1.125)					
5th gear	25/26 (0.961)					
6th gear	23/27 (0.851)					
Final reduction	45/15 (3.000) 46/15 on later models					
Final drive	#525 O-ring chain. 520 on later models					
Valve-train						
Valve angle	14° intake, 16° exhaust					
Intake valves	31 mm					
Intake valve stem	4.5 mm					
Intake valve lift	8.1 mm	8.7 mm				
Exhaust valves	25.5 mm					
Exhaust valve stem	4.5 mm					
Exhaust valve lift	6.1 mm	7.3 mm				
Performance
1/4 mile (0.40 km)	11.85 @ 110.17 mph (177.30 km/h)					
0–60 mph (0–97 km/h)	3.20 sec					
0–100 mph (0–161 km/h)	8.76 sec					
Roll on, 60–80 mph (97–129 km/h)						
Braking distance from 60 mph (97 km/h)	36.08 m (118.4 ft)					
Fuel economy	46 mpg_{‑US} (5.1 L/100 km; 55 mpg_{‑imp})					
Model year	1999–2002	2003	2004–2006	2007	2008-2009	2017–2023

== See also ==
- Suzuki SV1000
- Suzuki V-Strom 650
- Suzuki V-Strom 1000
