= Gladiola =

Gladiola or Gladiolas may refer to:

- Gladiolus, a genus of perennial flowering plants
- Gladiola (film), a 1915 silent drama
- "Gladiola", a 1976 song by Helen Reddy
- "Gladiolas", a song by Ida from the 2001 album The Braille Night
- The Gladiolas, an American band, later Maurice Williams and the Zodiacs
- Gladiola outpost, an Israeli IDF outpost attacked during the 2005 Hezbollah cross-border raid
- USS Gladiola (SP-184), a U.S. Navy patrol vessel 1917–1919
- Via gladiola, a route in the International Four Days Marches Nijmegen, a multiple-day marching event in The Netherlands

== See also ==
- Gladiolus (disambiguation)
