= USS Gladiator =

USS Gladiator may refer to:

- USS Gladiator (1876), a tugboat, built 1876, in service briefly with the U.S. Navy in 1918
- USS Gladiator (AM-319), a U.S. Navy minesweeper commissioned 1944, active during World War II, decommissioned 1955
- USS Gladiator (MCM-11), an Avenger-class mine countermeasures ship of the U.S. Navy, commissioned 1993, decommissioned 2025
