= Suzuki SFV650 Gladius =

Suzuki Gladius
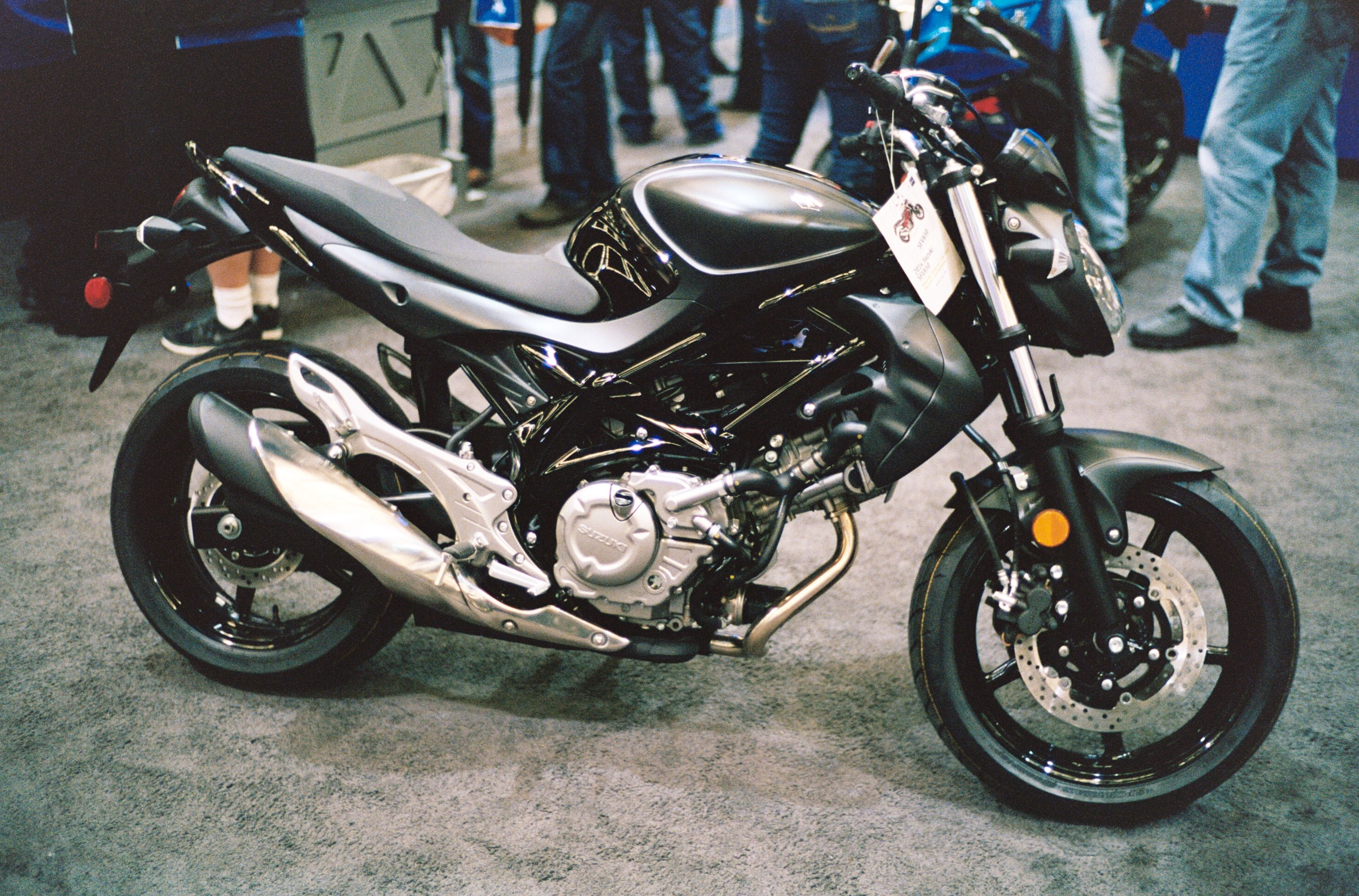
- Manufacturer: Suzuki
- Also called: SFV650
- Production: 2009–2016
- Predecessor: SV650
- Successor: SV650A
- Class: Naked bike
- Engine: 645 cc (39.4 cu in), liquid cooled, 4-stroke, 90° 76bhp v-twin
- Transmission: 6-speed constant mesh, manual, chain-drive
- Suspension: Front: Telescopic fork (41mm) coil spring, oil damped, 125 mm travel Rear: Link type, coil spring, oil damped, spring preload 7-step adjustable, 130 mm travel
- Brakes: Front: 2-piston calipers, 290 mm disc, twin Rear: 1-piston caliper, 240 mm disc
- Tires: Front: 120/70ZR17M/C (58W), tubeless Rear: 160/60ZR17M/C (69W), tubeless
- Rake, trail: 25° / 106 mm (4.2 in)
- Wheelbase: 1,445 mm (56.9 in)
- Dimensions: L: 2,130 mm (84 in); W: 760 mm (30 in)
- Seat height: 785 mm (30.9 in)
- Weight: 202 kg (445 lb); 205 kg (452 lb) with ABS (wet)
- Fuel capacity: 14.5 L (3.2 imp gal; 3.8 US gal) (13.5 L (3.0 imp gal; 3.6 US gal) in California)

The Suzuki Gladius SFV650 is a naked motorcycle introduced by Suzuki for the 2009 model year with the intention of it being a replacement for the SV650. Subsequently, in most countries the half-fairing second-generation SV650S continued to be sold alongside the Gladius until 2014.

The bike featured a new, more modern-looking aesthetic design, with a tubular trellis-style frame, more similar to the first generation SV650, and an upgraded engine in an effort to increase fuel economy, lower the emissions, and increase peak power and low- to mid-range torque. Also, the seat height was lowered from 800 mm (31.5 in) to 785 mm (30.9 in).

At the Tokyo Motor Show in 2009, Suzuki announced they would also be making smaller capacity, 400cc Gladius SFV400 for the Japanese market.

In 2017 the Gladius was replaced with the third generation SV650.

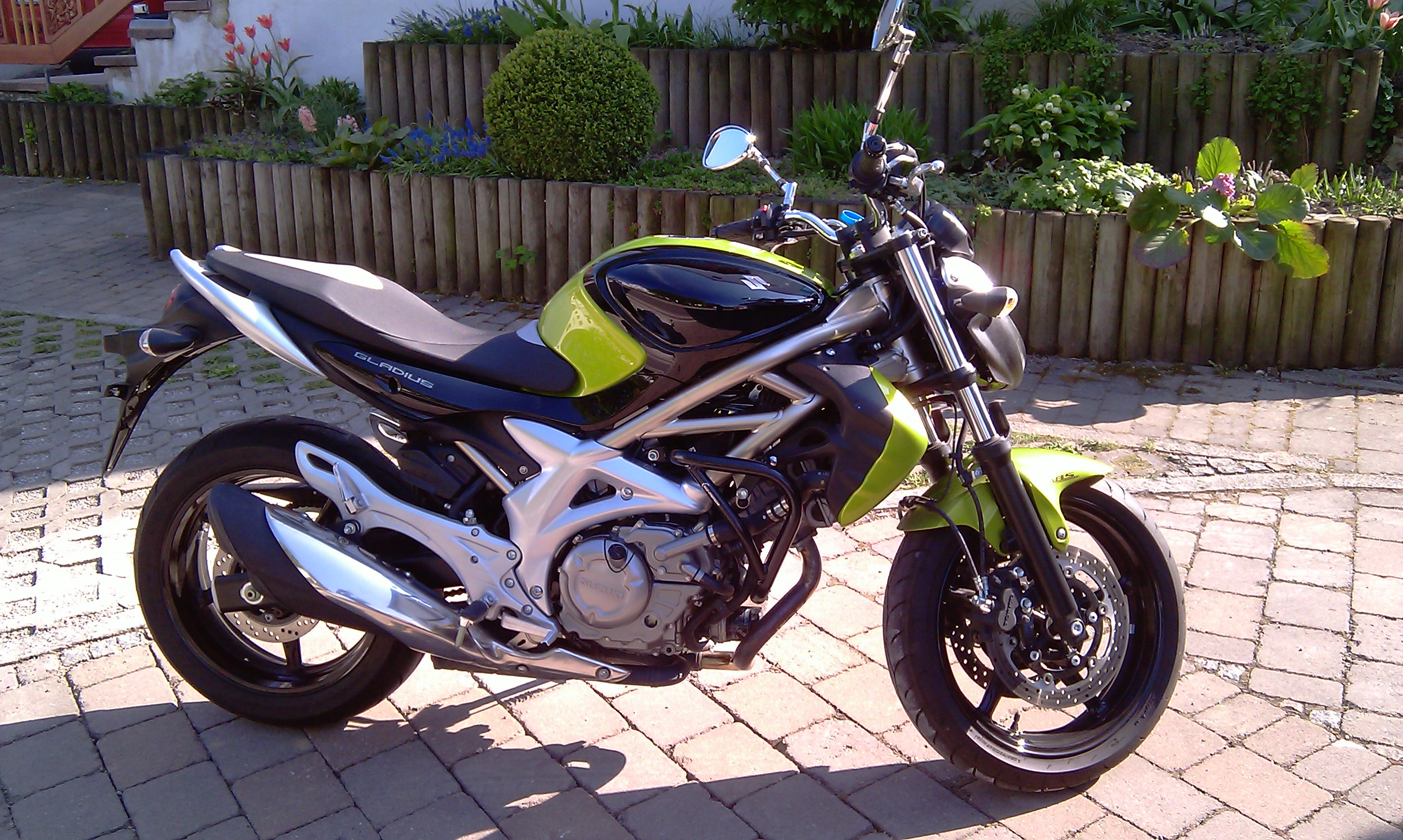
2009 Suzuki Gladius
