= Gladiatrix (disambiguation) =

A gladiatrix is the female equivalent of the gladiator of ancient Rome.

Gladiatrix or variants may refer to:

- Gladiatrix (comics) a fictional character
- "Gladiatrix", an episode of the TV series Birds of Prey
- Gladiatrix (Гладиатрикс), the Russian title of the film The Arena
- "Gladiatrix", a song by Myrkur from the 2017 album Mareridt
- Les Gladiatrices: Blondes vs. Brunes, a 2004 DVD based on a French reality TV show
- Gladiatress, a 2004 British comedy film
- "Gladiatoresses", an episode of Top Model (Scandinavian season 3)
- Gladiatorettes, a fictional cheerleading team from Sweet Valley High

== See also ==
- Gladiator (disambiguation)
- Gladius (disambiguation)
