= USS Gladiator (1876) =

Tugboat of the United States Navy

History

United States
- Name: USS Gladiator
- Laid down: 1876
- Acquired: by charter, 19 April 1918
- Substituted with another vessel: Emily B, 20 August 1918
- Decommissioned: 20 December 1918
- Fate: Both vessels returned to owner

General characteristics
- Type: Commercial Tugboat
- Displacement: 67 long tons (68 t)
- Length: 76 ft 1 in (23.19 m)
- Beam: 19 ft 4 in (5.89 m)
- Draft: 7 ft 4 in (2.24 m)
- Armament: None

USS Gladiator was built in 1876 at St. Mary's, Georgia; chartered from the Wilmington Towing Co., Wilmington, North Carolina; commissioned 19 April 1918; and assigned to the 5th Naval District.

== Tugboats Swapped with Owner ==
On 20 August 1918 the tug Emily B. owned by the same company, was substituted for Gladiator. On 20 December 1918 Gladiator decommissioned and was returned to her owners.
