= HMS Gladiolus =

Two ships of the Royal Navy have borne the name HMS Gladiolus, after the flower, the Gladiolus:

- HMS Gladiolus (1915) was an Arabis-class sloop launched in 1915. She was sold to the Portuguese Navy in 1920 and renamed Republica, where she served until c. 1943.
- HMS Gladiolus (K34) was a Flower-class corvette launched in 1940 and sunk in 1941.
