= HMS Gladiator =

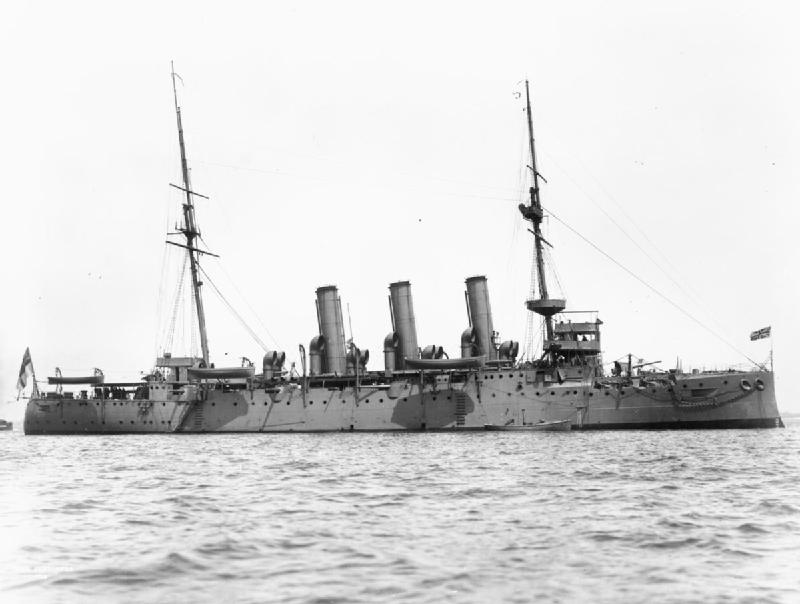
Photograph of British cruiser HMS Gladiator

Three ships of the Royal Navy have borne the name HMS Gladiator, after the Gladiators of the ancient Roman Empire:

- HMS Gladiator (1783) was a fifth-rate ship of the line launched in 1783. She spent her entire career on harbour service, never once putting to sea. She was broken up in 1817.
- HMS Gladiator (1844) was a wood paddle frigate launched in 1844 and broken up in 1879.
- HMS Gladiator (1896) was an Arrogant-class second class protected cruiser, launched in 1896 and sunk on 25 April 1908 in a collision off the Isle of Wight.
