= Gladiator (board wargame) =

Gladitorial combat wargame

Gladiator is a board wargame originally published by Battleline in 1979 in the two-game boxed set Circus Maximus along with the game Chariot Racing. Both games were bought by Avalon Hill and published as separate games in 1981.

== Description ==
Gladiator is a board wargame in which each player generates their own gladiator, using a pool of points to assign scores for training, strength, agility, constitution, combat capabilities and armor. The resultant characters are then pitted against each other in a battle for survival.

- In the basic game, the only type of gladiator available is the secutor, armed with gladius and scutum.
- In the advanced game, the retiarius, armed with net and trident, is also available.
- In the campaign game, players control rich Romans who own stables of gladiators. In this version, the winning player is not the one who wins the most matches, but the one who accumulates the most money through betting on the matches.

The game components include a 16" x 11" hex grid map and 12 gladiator counters that fit into plastic stands.

== Publication history ==
Gladiator, designed by Michael E. Matheny, was published in 1979 by Battleline Publications, a subsidiary of Heritage Models. (Gladiator and Chariot Racing were sold together under the name Circus Maximus.) When Battleline was sold to Avalon Hill in October 1979, the new owners published the two components of Circus Maximus as two separate games. While Chariot Racing was renamed Circus Maximus, Gladiator was published under its original title, featuring artwork by Cathy Chastain, Dale Scheaffer, and Mark Wheatley.

== Reception ==
In Issue 29 of Dragon, game designer Tim Kask commented, "The Gladiator system appears rather complex, but seems pretty accurate. I feel that if the two players were very comfortable with the rules and mechanics, it would be fairly accurate and exciting." Kask warned, "Gladiator is not designed for the novice or beginner."

In Issue 6 of Simulacrum, Joseph Scoleri reviewed the Battleline edition, and thought it was "a somewhat awkward companion [of Chariot Racing] due to its less intuitive play and more detailed mechanics." Five issues later, Scoleri reviewed the Avalon Hill edition and commented "Gladiator offers a nice middle ground between miniatures and board gaming."
