= Puerto Rico Telecommunications Regulatory Board =

Telecommunications regulatory authority in PR

The Puerto Rico Telecommunications Regulatory Board (TRB) —Spanish: Junta Reglamentadora de Telecomunicaciones (JRT)— was created in 1996 as a result of passage of Puerto Rico's Telecommunications Reform Law, drafted by then Sen. Kenneth McClintock and then Rep. Angel Cintrón. The three-member board was originally chaired by attorney Phoebe Forsythe Isales and is currently chaired by attorney Miguel Reyes. One of its original members, Vicente Aguirre, remains on the board.

The TRB exercises state-level regulatory powers not preempted by federal law, and works closely with the Federal Communications Commission (FCC).
