= Gladiator (1985 video game) =

1985 video game

- Publisher: Domark Limited
- Designers: Mike Green; Mike Moscoff
- Platforms: ZX Spectrum, Amstrad CPC, Commodore 64
- Release: EU: 1985 (ZX); EU: 1986 (CPC, C64)
- Genre: Fighting
- Modes: Single-player, multiplayer

Gladiator is a fighting video game published by Domark Limited for the 48K ZX Spectrums in 1985. Ports for the Amstrad CPC, Commodore 64 and 128K ZX Spectrums were released in 1986.

== Gameplay ==
The Roman legion has pillaged the player character's hometown, sold them into slavery, and consigned them to a gladiator school. The player has to gather money as a gladiator to attain their freedom.

The game is a one-on-one fighting game. The player has to select two primary weapons from a selection of 45. The second weapon may be replaced with a shield if desired. Additionally, a dagger serves as a third weapon, which can only be utilized when the primary weapons have been thrown or lost during the match. The player can execute a total of 25 different types of strikes using their chosen weapons.

== Reception ==
Reception

Review scores
Publication	Score
Amstrad Action	35% (Amstrad)
Amtix	10% (Amstrad)
Crash	77% (Spectrum)
Computer and Video Games	34/40 (Spectrum)

Computer and Video Games gave a positive review and noted the controls as complex due to the number of moves the player can make. Crash didn't like the controls and said the game is nowhere near the quality of The Way of the Exploding Fist. Amtix called the game "totally unplayable and mindnumbingly dull". Amstrad Action said the game is too similar to other combat games and noted the game's very high difficulty. Computer Gamer liked the variety of weapons but said there are too many moves to learn.
