= Manuel Espinosa Yglesias =

Mexican entrepreneur and philanthropist (1909–2000)

Manuel Yglesias (May 9, 1909, Puebla, Mexico – June 8, 2000, Mexico City) was a Mexican entrepreneur and philanthropist, general director and major shareholder of the Mexican bank Bancomer from 1959 until 1982, when president López Portillo decreed the expropriation of all private Mexican banks. The origin of a number of foundations may be traced to his philanthropic legacy.

== Career ==
=== In the cinematographic industry ===
Yglesias' father died when he was 20 years old and from then, he took the lead of the family businesses, which consisted of five cinemas in the states of Puebla and Tlaxcala. When Yglesias was 30, he associated with William O. Jenkins to build a film exhibition company. Years later he took control of the Compañía Operadora de Teatros (COTSA), that in due time covered practically all the national territory. Espinosa was his general manager until 1960.

=== In banking: Banco de Comercio (Bancomer) ===
In 1950, Yglesias became a member of the Board of Banco de Comercio (Bancomer), as a substitute of William O. Jenkins, his partner in the cinema business. Jenkins held 41% of the shares of the bank. After buying shares from various stakeholders, Yglesias acquired from William Jenkins, through the exchange of a significant portion of his shares in the film industry, his stocks from Banco de Comercio in 1955. He then became the major shareholder and president of the Board in 1958. In 1959 he was appointed general director of the institution.

One of his first actions as general director was to affiliate 23 Mexican local banks to constitute the Bancos de Comercio System (Sistema Bancos de Comercio). In this way he became linked to the most important businessmen of the country. To strengthen these relationships, Yglesias frequently visited the cities where the affiliated banks were located, met with regional board members and local authorities. In 1957, Yglesias led Banco de Comercio to establish investment banking activities, a mortgage society, a real estate company, and an insurance company. They all became sister financial institutions of Banco de Comercio (by then, it was named Bancomer). They were independent from the bank, but allowed it to function as a multiple bank many years before it became common practice in Mexico. Bancomer multiplied profits in just a few years and gained market share. Through the years, Sistema Bancos de Comercio covered the whole country through affiliated banks which became part of Bancomer, which made it the largest bank of Mexico at the time of the expropriation, and one of the most important banks of Latin America.

In those years, Espinosa was a pioneer using commercial advertising to promote the bank. It also invested in large computer systems that would support a larger number of clients, even those with middle and low incomes. For years, the Board under Yglesias followed a policy of profits’ reinvestment which underpinned the bank's growth. In the 1960s he coined the phrase: “It is preferable to have partners than creditors”, with the idea that it was better for Mexico to promote foreign investment in order to access savings from abroad, than contracting external debt.

==== Mexican Bankers Association ====
The Mexican Bankers Association was formed in 1928 to represent the interests of the bankers. Before the banks’ expropriation (or nationalization as was commonly known) in 1982, bankers who were leaders of the association, and those with national banks and regional boards, became the informal representatives of the private sector with the federal government. Most businessmen were also bank board members. Yglesias was president of the Bankers’ Association in two occasions (1965 and 1971). As the bankers’ president, as Bancomer general director as well as a citizen, he used his position in multiple academic and professional forums, service clubs y press meetings to promote his ideas about entrepreneurship, economics, society and fundamental problems of Mexico. In 2003 the association changed its name to Mexico's Banks Association.

=== Philanthropy ===
In 1963, Yglesias became the president of the Mary Street Jenkins Foundation. In 1979 he established the Amparo Foundation in memory of his wife, Amparo Rugarcía, using his own money and not his businesses resources, as it frequently happens in Mexico. Some of its most important projects were: the recovery and restoration of the historical Centre of Mexico City, the excavations of the Templo Mayor of Mexico City, and the Amparo Museum in the city of Puebla, inaugurated in February 1991. One of the legacies of Yglesias was the establishment of several charities and foundations by himself and their daughters. Her oldest daughter initiated the Espinosa Rugarcía Foundation (Fundación ESRU), which in turn created the Centro de Estudios Yglesias (CEEY) in 2005. As president of both foundations, Mary Street Jenkins and Amparo Foundation, they were the largest Mexican foundations at the time. Through them, he promoted the development of educational, social assistance, health, and cultural institutions, that included financial aid to thousands of young students.

His successor in the Amparo Foundation was his daughter Ángeles Espinosa Rugarcía, who served as president until her death. The foundation is currently directed by Javier Alonso Espinosa, Manuel Espinosa's grandson. Amparo Espinosa Rugarcía, Yglesias’ eldest daughter, is the president of the Espinosa Rugarcía Foundation (ESRU Foundation) and Demac, an organization devoted to women studies. His youngest daughter, Guadalupe, directs Monte Fenix Foundation, a clinic where health attention and psychotherapeutic services are provided for people with addictions related conditions.

=== Liberalism and social purpose: women's rights ===
The ideas of Yglesias were liberal and he had deep social convictions. He believed that the market was the best way to promote a country's development and structure the economy. But at the same time, he considered that the State should intervene to assure fair treatment and effectiveness for the general good. He also considered that competitivity and productivity were the engines of economic growth, and that it was indispensable to stimulate education to enhance people's development and social mobility. He thought that inflation mainly affects poor people and damages economic stability. Fiscal discipline and permanent investment accelerate growth and generate well paid jobs. He believed that it was indispensable to fight poverty through offering opportunities to people, especially women. His interests also included women’ rights many years before these issues became so relevant in public opinion. He believed that all persons, men and women, should be given the opportunity to fully develop as human beings. These convictions are embedded in the several foundations and charities that today are financed by his philanthropic legacy.
