= Gladiators motorcycle club =

Gladiators Motorcycle Club
- Abbreviation: GMC
- Founded: 2009
- Founded at: Columbus, Ohio area, United States
- Type: Military Motorcycle Club
- Region served: United States
- Website: www.gladiatorsmc.com/

The Gladiators Motorcycle Club is a non-territorial club established near the Columbus, Ohio area in 2009. The club's members are current and former members of the United States Armed Forces.

Membership in Gladiators is limited to men who have served in the United States Armed Forces and ride "cruiser" style motorcycles. Unlike some other Military-based clubs, Gladiators acceptance is not based on discharge status or race.

== History ==
Gladiators MC was founded by former members of Untamed Spirit MC and was established in August 2009 near Columbus, Ohio. Unlike Gladiators MC, Untamed Spirit MC accepted female members to be fully patched, in addition to holding officer positions. While this position was accepted by the dominant 1% club in the area, other organizations were not as accepting. As problems increased, Untamed Spirit MC memberships declined and the club eventually dissolved.

In order to distance itself from the problems experienced with Untamed Spirit MC, the newly formed Gladiators MC established a presence, without the wearing of patches. In 2013, approval was requested by the dominant clubs of the area to enter inside the city of Columbus. After several months of failed attempts to reach an agreement, the Gladiators have remained outside of the city limits as a show of respect to the established clubs.

== Clubs with similar names ==
A number of motorcycle clubs are called Gladiators, e.g. Norway. and Australia. These are not part of GMC USA and share only the name, having a different patch design and colors.

On August 2, 2013, the Gladiators MC (USA) met with Gladiators Norway in the town of Bodø after receiving an invitation by the Norwegian Gladiators to attend a party in Oslo, Norway. This was the first meeting of the two organizations. During their stay in Bodø, the Avisa Nordland newspaper printed an article in their August 6, 2013 edition (Nr. 178) in regards to the visit between the two organizations. On August 9, 2013, both clubs united with Gladiators Germany, just outside the city of Oslo. Not only was this the first time Gladiators MC meet the German Gladiators, but this was also the first time all three clubs would be together.

The oldest Motorcycle Club calling themselves 'Gadiators' is 'Gladiators MC Australia' which was the first 'outlaw' or '1%' club in Australia, founded in 1960. The Australian Club is not affiliated with 'Gladiators' of USA, Norway or Germany.

== See also ==
- List of outlaw motorcycle clubs
- Criminal Law (Criminal Organisations Disruption) Amendment Act 2013
