= Manuel Espinosa (Cuban exile) =

Manuel Espinosa (died August 5, 1987) was a Cuban exile who lived in the United States from the 1960s until his death, primarily in and around Miami, Florida. From 1975 to 1980, he was the pastor of an Evangelical Church in Hialeah, Florida, which he founded. During this period, Espinosa was a prominent advocate of improving Cuba–United States relations. Beginning in 1980, Espinosa completely switched his public stance, and began vocally criticizing Fidel Castro and his government.

== Biography ==
Espinosa was born in Cuba in 1938 or 1939. Served in the Cuban Army, where in 1959 he held the rank of captain. In the early 1960s, he reportedly joined revolutionaries fighting against the Cuban government, and moved to the United States in 1962, settling in Miami, Florida.

Espinosa moved to New York City in 1970. While there, Espinosa converted to Christianity in 1972, following the death of his mother. While in New York City, he later claimed, he received training to be a pastor. His critics would deny this and allege that he was "a self-ordained minister".

=== Pro-Castro pastor ===
Espinosa moved back to Florida, and founded a non-denominal church, the Evangelical Church, in Hialeah, Florida, in 1975. The church, with a congregation consisting largely of Cuban exiles and Espinosa as its pastor, experienced rapid growth. Within a year, the church had an estimated membership of over 300. By 1978, that figure was reported to be 730 or 900 members.

While pastor, Espinosa became known for advocating for the normalization of Cuba–United States relations. He visited Cuba at least twice, including in 1975 and 1978, and stated that he used these trips to speak to officials in the Cuban government about "the reunification of Cuban families and the plight of political prisoners." In 1978, Fidel Castro publicly credited Espinosa with influencing him to seek to "bridge the gap with Cuban exiles." Espinosa was a member of the Committee of 75.

Espinosa also distributed petitions to support lifting Cuban sanctions. He faced death threats for his public statements, and was beaten in 1975. In 1979, a bomb was found outside his church. Historian Jesus Arboleya writes that Espinosa's church was "the best known coexistence group" of its period. Arboleya argues that Espinosa did not serious believe the politics he espoused, and instead exploited Cuban exiles for fame and wealth. This, in turn, undermined the ability of genuine advocates of coexistence. Espinosa also faced an investigation of his church by the Internal Revenue Service.

=== Later career ===
In 1980 Espinosa publicly announced that he had been working for the Cuban government. He followed up this confession with accusing several other Cuban exiles of working for the Cuban government. The historian Maria Cristina Garcia wrote that Espinosa's admission to be working for the Cuban government did not surprise most Cuban-American immigrants: "his admission simply confirmed the popular belief that active supporters of renewed relations with Cuba had to be in some way connected to the regime."

After 1980, Espinosa became a passionate critic of Castro. He left work as a pastor, and began a career as a security consultant and private investigator. Additionally, Espinosa ran a regular talk show on WQBA. He spent his free time searching for Communist spies, primarily in Little Havana, where he became known as "The Hunter". Espinosa was a controversial figure, and received several death threats, including in February 1983, when a bomb was found planted underneath his car.

His radio attacks on those in favor of improving Cuban-American relations, according to Robert M. Levine "more than anyone else put the lives of [Bernardo] Benes and the others who had gone to Cuba in jeopardy. Espinosa's accusations were usually made without evidence, and he faced lawsuits from at three of those who he named as working for the Cuban government on his talk show.

== Personal life ==
Espinosa had a wife and a son. He died on August 5, 1987.

== Bibliography ==
- Arboleya, Jesús (2000). The Cuban Counterrevolution. Ohio University Press. ISBN 978-0-89680-214-8.
- Avalos, Hector (2021). Introduction to the U.S. Latina and Latino Religious Experience. BRILL. ISBN 978-90-04-49658-3.
- Garcia, Maria Cristina (1996). Havana USA: Cuban Exiles and Cuban Americans in South Florida, 1959-1994. University of California Press. ISBN 978-0-520-91999-0.
- Levine, Richard M. (2001). Secret Missions to Cuba: Fidel Castro, Bernardo Benes, and Cuban Miami. Palgrave. ISBN 0-312-23987-4.
