= Atlantic University (Puerto Rico) =

Digital arts school in Guaynabo, Puerto Rico

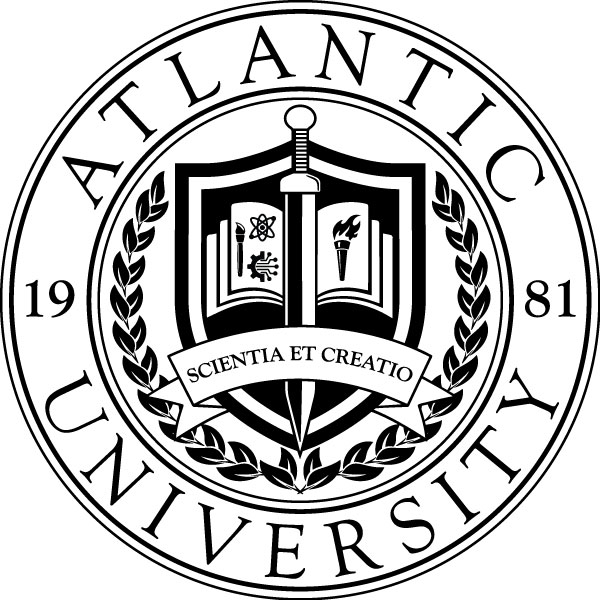
- Academic seal of Atlantic University
- Former name: Atlantic University College
- Motto: Scientia et creatio
- Motto in English: Science and creation
- Type: Private college
- Established: 1981; 45 years ago
- Founder: Ramón Barquín
- Affiliations: Atlantic University, Inc.
- President: Alexandra Fernández Navarro
- Faculty: 77
- Location: Guaynabo, Puerto Rico; 18.357395°N 66.111714°W
- Campus: Urban
- Colors: Dark Violet, Pure Blue and White
- Nickname: Gladiators
- Mascot: Gladiator
- Sports: Esports
- Website: www.atlanticu.edu

Atlantic University (formerly Atlantic University College) is a private college in Guaynabo, Puerto Rico, founded in 1983 by Col. Ramón M. Barquín. It is one of the few colleges or universities in the Caribbean specializing in digital arts education in all of its forms.

== History ==
Atlantic University is a non-profit institution, located in the heart of Guaynabo, facing the city's central plaza. It is the first university founded in Guaynabo and is located in the city's historical district, which preserves the distinctive Spanish colonial-style architecture that characterized Puerto Rico's towns and cities in earlier times. Atlantic University was founded in response to Guaynabo's need for a local institution of higher education, as well as the growing demand for digital arts expertise in the commercial sector.

The school's core programs were first offered in 1981, and now include a growing range of bachelor's and master's degree programs. The institution officially dropped "College" from its name, becoming Atlantic University in August 2023.

== Administration ==
Atlantic University is a private institution of higher education operated by Atlantic University, Inc., a non-profit corporation established under the laws of the Commonwealth of Puerto Rico and registered with the U.S. State Department.

== Accreditation and licensing ==
Atlantic University authorized by the Puerto Rico Education Council and accredited by the Accrediting Commission of Career Schools and Colleges to award bachelor's, and master's degrees. It is also approved for students with educational benefits in the different G.I. Bill programs.

== Memberships ==
Atlantic University is a member of the following associations:

- Hispanic Association of Colleges and Universities (HACU)
- Council for Higher Education Accreditation (CHEA)
- American Association of Hispanics in Higher Education (AAHHE)
- Association for Supervision and Curriculum Development (ASCD)
- Collaborative Institutional Training Initiative (CT Program)
- International Game Developers Association (IGDA)
- Printing Industries of America (PIA)
- Asociación Puertorriqueña de Investigación Institucional
- Puerto Rico Chamber of Commerce
- Puerto Rico Manufacturers Association
- Asociación de Educación Privada

== Departments ==
- General Education
- Business Administration
- Digital Cinematography Sciences
- Digital Graphic Design
- Digital Animation Sciences
- Video Game Art and Design Sciences
- Graduate Studies
