= List of Gladiolus cultivars =

This is a list of cultivars of the Gladiolus genus of flowering plants.

- 'Adlib Salmon'
- 'Adlib Scarlet'
- 'Advance'
- 'Aldebaran'
- 'American Beauty'
- 'Amethyst'
- 'Amsterdam'
- 'Airbourne'
- 'Applause'
- 'Apricot Dream'
- 'Arabian Night'
- 'Arctic Queen'
- 'Arirang'
- 'Artistry II'
- 'Atom': flowers vermilion red with white edging
- 'Baby K'
- 'Bel Canto'
- 'Bit o'Heaven'
- 'Black Beauty'
- 'Black Jack'
- 'Black Walnut'
- 'Bleeding Heart'
- 'Blue Bird'
- 'Blue Conqueror'
- 'Blue Isle'
- 'Blue Lagoon'
- 'Blue Sky'
- 'Blue Tide'
- 'Blue Tropic'
- 'Binky'
- 'Burma'
- 'Butterfly'
- 'Candida Ali'

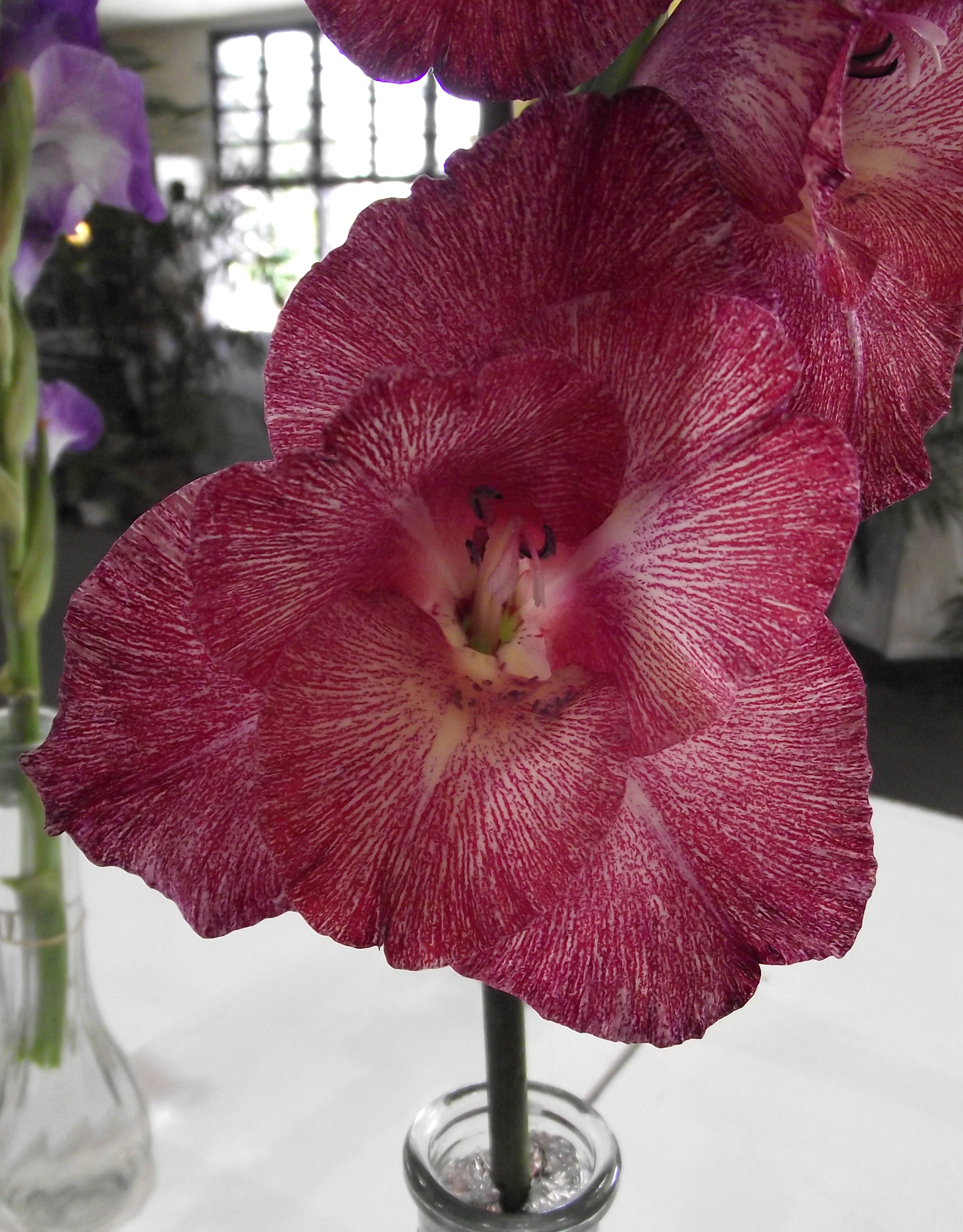
'Chocolate Ripple'

- 'Candy Man'
- 'Cardinal'
- 'Caribbean'
- 'Carmello'
- 'Carmen'
- 'Carolina-Primrose'
- 'Cavalcade II'
- 'Charm'
- 'Charm Glow'
- 'Charming Beauty': flowers soft pink with a white throat
- 'Cherry Splash'
- 'Cipriana'
- 'Claudia'
- 'Clujana'
- 'Comet II'
- 'Cordula'
- 'Costa'
- 'Cream Frills'
- 'Crinklette'
- 'Crusader'

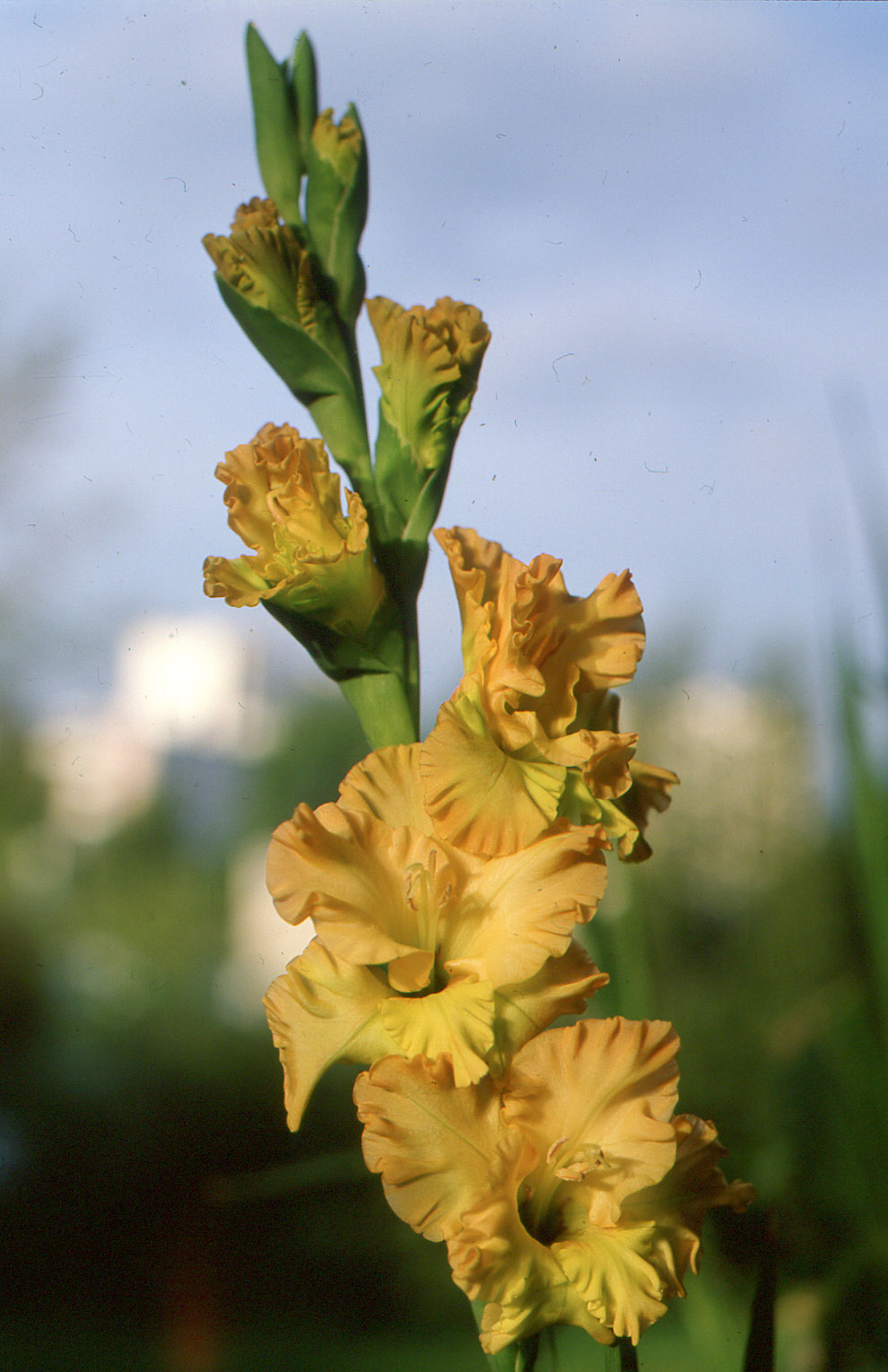
'Dykhanie Oseni'

- 'Dark Sky'
- 'David Hills'
- 'Dawn Glow'
- 'Days End'
- 'Debutante'
- 'Desperado'
- 'Don Juan'
- 'Drama'
- 'Dynamite'
- 'Earlianna'
- 'Early Peach'
- 'Elizabeth the Queen'
- 'Emerald Isle'
- 'Emerald Necklaces'
- 'Emile Aubrun'
- 'Erin Rose'
- 'Espresso'
- 'Excelsa'

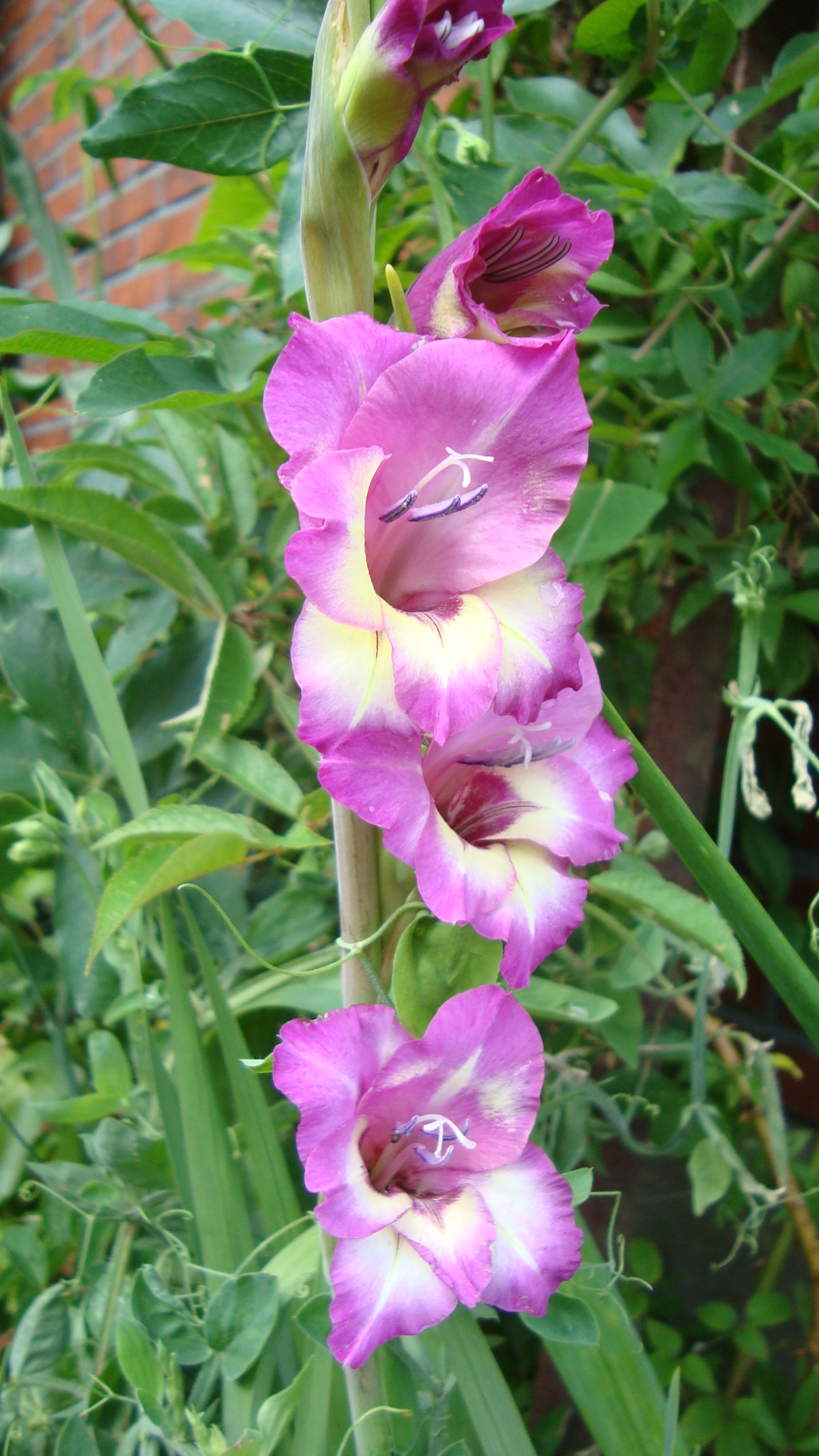
'Flevo Amico', Snoek

- 'Faithful'
- 'Fidelio'
- 'Fiesta'
- 'Fiorentina'
- 'Fire of Desires'
- 'Firecracker'
- 'Flame'
- 'Flevo Jive'
- 'Forta Rosa'
- 'French Silk'
- 'Friendship'
- 'Friendship Pink'
- 'Fun Time'
- 'Gemim'
- 'Glendale'
- 'Glorious'
- 'Gold Dust'
- 'Golden Chimes'
- 'Golden Measure'
- 'Good News'
- 'Great Lakes'
- 'Green Light'
- 'Green Pastures'
- 'Green Star'
- 'Green With Envy'
- 'Green Woodpecker'
- 'Heartbreak'
- 'High Seas'
- 'High Style'
- 'Holiday'
- 'Hunting Song'
- 'Ice Cap'
- 'Impressive'
- 'Innocence'
- 'Irene's Green'
- 'Ivory Tower'
- 'Jeannie Rose'
- 'Jester'
- 'Jubilee'
- 'King David'
- 'Kristen Kay'
- 'La Fiesta'
- 'Lady Lucille'
- 'Lavender Bell'
- 'Lavender Masterpiece'
- 'Lemon Drop'
- 'Little Maid'
- 'Little Peach'
- 'Love Poem'
- 'Lucy's Lavender'
- 'Lullaby'
- 'Lumiere'
- 'Madonna'
- 'Maid of Orleans'
- 'Majic'
- 'Mary Housley'
- 'Match Point'
- 'May Queen'
- 'Melody'
- 'Mildred Louise'
- 'Mr. Carl Fischer'
- 'Mr. Lincoln'
- 'Mr. T.'
- 'Mon Amour'
- 'Mystic Glow'
- 'Naboo'
- 'Necessity'
- 'New Era'
- 'Ninth Symphony'
- 'Novalux'
- 'Orange Sherbert'
- 'Orange Splendor'
- 'Oreleans'
- 'Oscar'

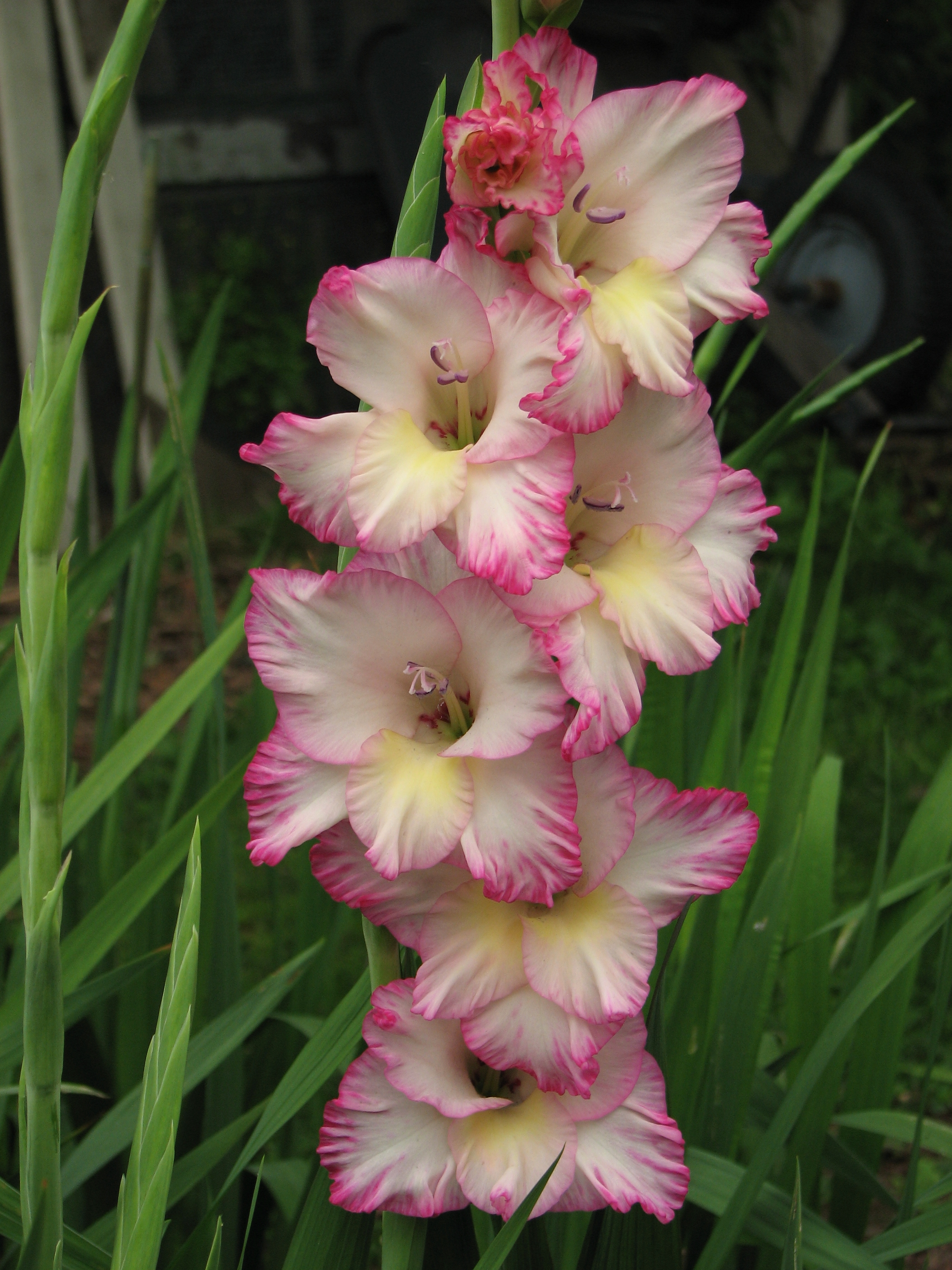
'Priscilla'

- 'Painted Lady'
- 'Parade'
- 'Party Dress'
- 'Patra'
- 'Peacock Orchid'
- 'Peppermint'
- 'Peter Pears'
- 'Picardy'
- 'Pierre'
- 'Pink Dream'
- 'Pink Fantasy'
- 'Pink Pearl'
- 'Pink Veloce'
- 'Pioneer'
- 'Plum Tart'
- 'Prairie Gold'
- 'Pretty Baby'
- 'Prince Indigo'
- 'Princess Margret'
- 'Prins Claus'
- 'Priscilla'

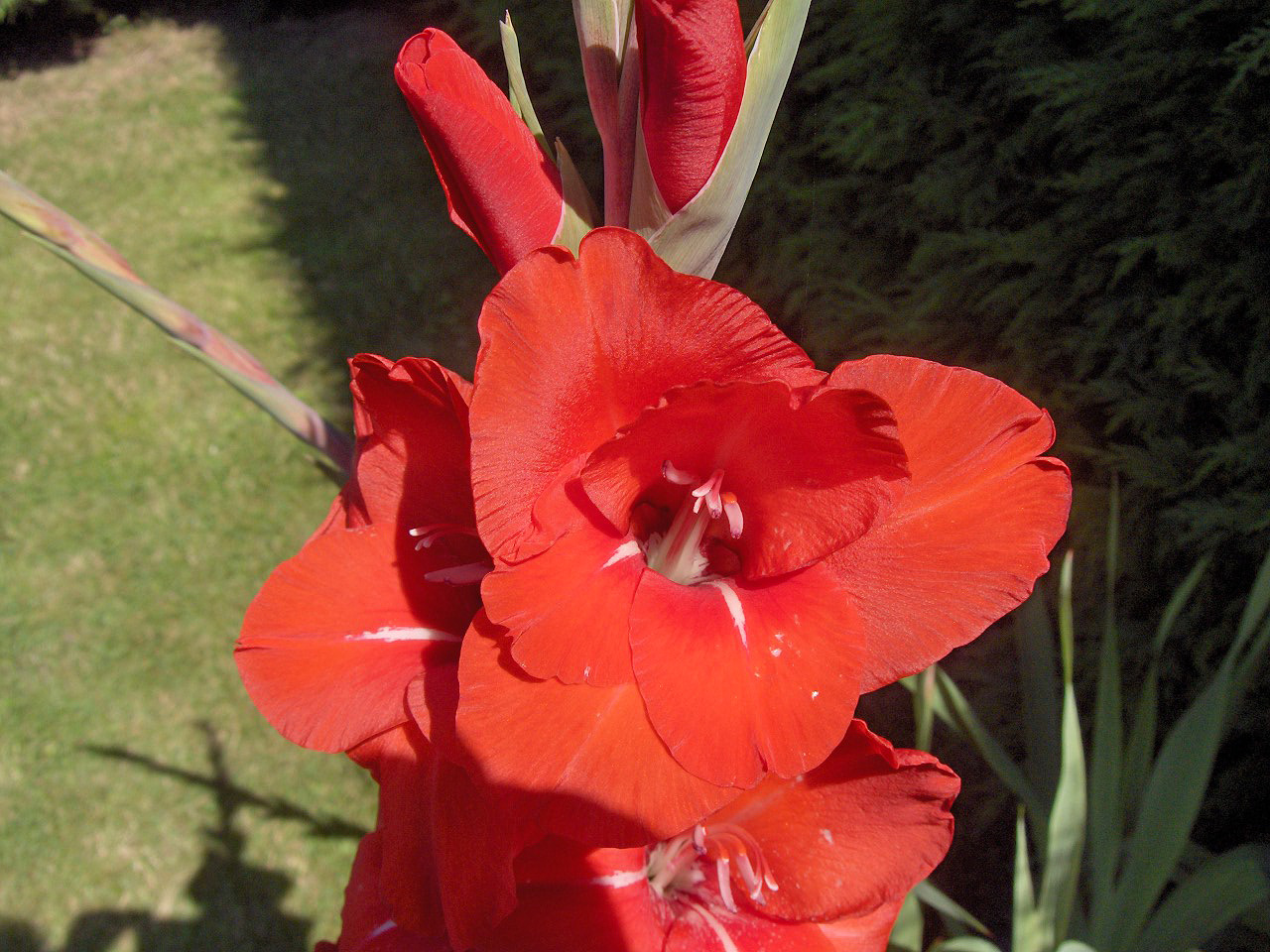
'Red Cascade'

- 'Pulchritude'
- 'Purple King'
- 'Ramona'
- 'Rapid Red'
- 'Red Advance'
- 'Red Beauty'
- 'Red Majesty'
- 'Red Neck'
- 'Reverie'
- 'Rising Sun'
- 'Robinetta': flowers red with white streaks, up to 7 per stem; grows to 45–60 cm
- 'Rose Supreme'
- 'Royal Velvet'
- 'Sabrina'
- 'Salmon Classic'
- 'Sand Dancer'
- 'Sapporo'
- 'Sashey'
- 'Satin N' Lace'
- 'Saturn'
- 'Shooting Stars'
- 'Short Cake'
- 'Silky'
- 'Singing Fountains'
- 'Snapshot'
- 'Snow Princess'
- 'Snow White'
- 'Speranta'
- 'Spic and Span'
- 'Spitfire'
- 'Spring Time'
- 'Summer Rose'
- 'Summer Sunshine'
- 'Sun Ruffles'
- 'Star of Bethlehem'
- 'Starry Night'
- 'Stromboli'
- 'Sylvia'

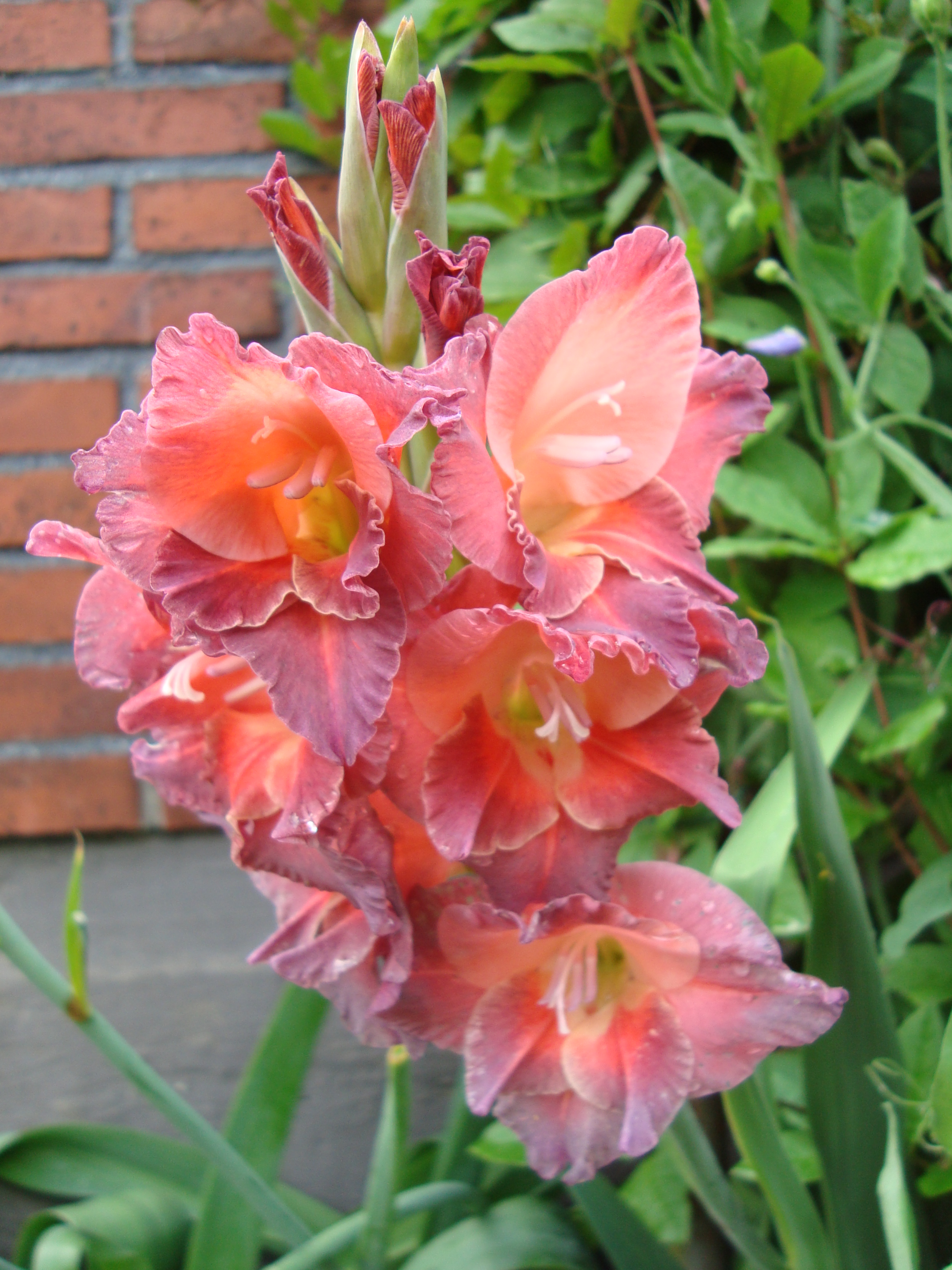
'Tantastic', Cartmell 1991

- 'Tangelo'
- 'Tattle Tale'
- 'Token'
- 'Tout a Toi'
- 'Tuscany'
- 'Trader Horn'
- 'Trinket'
- 'Tropic Sea'
- 'Trust'
- 'Vedanapoli'
- 'Veronica'
- 'Vista'
- 'Vulcano'
- 'Wasaga'
- 'Wedding Bells'
- 'White and Cool'
- 'White Lace'
- 'White Nova'
- 'White Prosperity'
- 'Wild Rice'
- 'Wind Song'
- 'Wine And Roses'
- 'Yellow Candy'
- 'Yellow Cup'
- 'Yellow Stone'
- 'Zoe'
- 'Zorro'
- 'Zwanenburg'
