= List of motorcycles by type of engine =

List of motorcycles by type of engine is a list of motorcycles by the type of motorcycle engine used by the vehicle, such as by the number of cylinders or configuration.

A transverse engine is an engine mounted in a vehicle so that the engine's crankshaft axis is perpendicular to the direction of travel. In a longitudinal engine configuration, the engine's crankshaft axis is parallel with the direction of travel. However, the description of the orientation of "V" and "flat" motorcycle engines differs from this convention. Motorcycles with a V-twin engine mounted with its crankshaft mounted in line with the frame, e.g. the Honda CX series, are said to have "transverse" engines, while motorcycles with a V-twin mounted with its crankshaft mounted perpendicular to the frame, e.g. most Harley-Davidsons, are said to have "longitudinal" engines. This convention uses the longest horizontal dimension (length or width) of the engine as its axis instead of the line of the crankshaft.

There are many different models of motorcycles that have been produced, and as such, this list is not exhaustive and contains only more notable examples.

== Single cylinder ==
- Armstrong MT500
- BMW R2
- BMW R25
- BMW R26
- BMW R27
- BMW F650CS
- BSA Blue Star
- BSA C15
- BSA B44 Shooting Star
- Cagiva 350 SST
- Cagiva River
- DKW RT 125
- Ducati Mach 1
- Ducati Supermono
- Harley-Davidson Topper
- Harley-Davidson Baja 100
- Harley-Davidson MT350E
- Honda CB125
- Honda CBR250R/CBR300R
- Honda CRF series
- Honda Dream Yuga
- Honda Grom
- Honda NF110i/125i
- Honda Rebel 300 (Single cylinder, after model change in 2020)
- Honda Super Cub
- Honda Winner
- Honda XBR500
- Honda XL250
- Honda XL350R
- Husqvarna Vitpilen/Svartpilen 401
- Husqvarna Vitpilen/Svartpilen 701
- Honda XR250
- Hyosung GD250N
- Hyosung GD250R
- Kawasaki Z125 Pro
- Kawasaki KLR650
- Kawasaki Ninja 250SL
- KTM 200 Duke
- KTM 390 Duke
- KTM 690 Duke
- KTM RC 390
- Langer's "NSU Bison 2000" 2 liter single
- Moto Guzzi Cardellino
- MV Agusta 125 SOHC
- MZ SM 125
- MZ Skorpion
- New Werner
- Norton CS1
- Peugeot JetForce
- Royal Enfield Bullet
- Royal Enfield Himalayan
- Sachs MadAss
- Suzuki Boulevard S40
- Suzuki DR-Z400
- Suzuki DR650
- Suzuki XF650
- Suzuki DR800S (Production bike with the largest single-cylinder engine ever)
- Suzuki Gixxer 150, 250, SF250
- Suzuki LS650 Savage
- Suzuki TU250
- Triumph Ricardo
- Triumph Tiger Cub
- Yamaha MT-03
- Yamaha SR400, SR500
- Yamaha SZR660
- Yamaha T-150
- Yamaha XT225, XT250 (Serow)
- Yamaha XT 500, XT 600 (Ténéré)
- Werner Dienstkrad 1440cc single cylinder steampunk motorcycle

The vast majority of motor scooters are single cylinder (see List of motor scooter manufacturers and brands).

== Split-single ==
The split-single (Doppelkolbenmotor to its German and Austrian manufacturers), is a variant on the two-stroke engine with two cylinders sharing a single combustion chamber. It is also known as a twingle, U-cylinder, or doppelkolben

- DKW SS 250
- EMC 350CC
- Garelli 350CC Turismo
- Puch GS 350
- Puch 250 SGS
- TWN BD 250
- TWN BDG 125
- TWN BDG 250 (Triumph (TWN))
- TWN Cornet
- TWN Boss
- TWN Contessa (scooter)

== Two cylinder ==
=== V-twin ===
==== Longitudinal ====
- AJS S3 V-twin
- Honda CX series
- Indian 841
- Marusho Lilac V-twin
- Moto Guzzi Le Mans
- Moto Guzzi V7 Sport
- Moto Guzzi Griso
- Moto Guzzi Stelvio
- Moto Guzzi California
- Victoria V35 Bergmeister

==== Transverse ====
- Aprilia Dorsoduro
- Aprilia Falco
- Aprilia Mana 850
- Aprilia RSV Mille
- Aprilia RSV 1000 R
- Aprilia Shiver
- Aprilia sxv 450 (550)
- Aprilia Tuono
- Britten V1000
- BSA Model E and other models
- Cagiva Raptor 650
- Cagiva Raptor 1000
- Ducati Monster 696
- Ducati 748
- Ducati 749
- Ducati Monster 821
- Ducati 848
- Ducati 851
- Ducati 888
- Ducati 899
- Ducati 916
- Ducati 959
- Ducati 996
- Ducati 998
- Ducati 999
- Ducati 1098
- Ducati 1198
- Ducati 1199
- Ducati 1299
- Ducati Diavel
- Gunbus 410 (Leonhardt Gunbus 410 with 6.7 L/410 ci V-twin)
- Harley-Davidson FL (multiple bikes)
- Harley-Davidson VRSC (the V-rod)
- Harley-Davidson Model 7D
- Hesketh V1000
- Honda NT650
- Honda NT400 (BROS)
- Honda NTV650 Deuville/Revere
- Honda RC51
- Honda VTR1000
- Honda VTR250
- Honda VT1100
- Honda VT750
- KTM 990 Adventure
- KTM 990 Super Duke
- KTM 1190 RC8
- KTM 1290 Super Adventure
- KTM 1290 Super Duke R
- Hyosung GT250
- Hyosung GT650R
- Indian Scout
- Indian Chief
- Pope Model L
- Princeps AutoCar Co V-twin motorcycle
- XL-ALL V-twin
- Suzuki Boulevard M50
- Suzuki SFV650 Gladius
- Suzuki SV650
- Suzuki SV1000
- Suzuki VX 800
- Suzuki V-Strom 650
- Suzuki V-Strom 1000
- Suzuki V-Strom 1050
- Suzuki TL1000R
- Suzuki TL1000S
- Vincent Rapide
- Yamaha Virago
- Yamaha XVS / Dragstar / VStar

=== Flat-twin ===
==== Longitudinal ====
- BMW R1150GS
- BMW R1150R
- BMW R1200C
- BMW R1200GS
- BMW R1200R
- BMW R1200RT
- BMW R32
- BMW R90S
- BMW Type 255
- Indian Model O
- Harley-Davidson XA
- Ural
- Velocette LE
- Velocette Valiant

==== Transverse ====
- Williamson Flat Twin
- Douglas Dragonfly
- Harley-Davidson Model W

=== Straight twin ===
a.k.a. parallel-twin, inline-twin, vertical-twin, straight-two, or inline-two

==== Transverse ====
- Aprilia RS 660
- Benelli BN302 / TNT 300
- Benelli 302s
- BMW F800GT
- BMW F800S
- BMW F800ST
- Honda CB200 and CL200
- Honda CB350
- Honda CB360
- Honda CB400T
- Honda CB400 series (2013)
- Honda CB450
- Honda CB500T
- Honda CBR250RR (2017)
- Honda CMX500 (2017)
- Honda NC700 series
- Honda Nighthawk 250
- Husqvarna Nuda 900R
- Husqvarna Nuda 900
- Kawasaki Ninja 250R
- Kawasaki Ninja 300
- Kawasaki Ninja 400
- Kawasaki EN 450ltd
- Kawasaki Ninja EX500R
- Kawasaki Ninja 650R
- Kawasaki Z250
- Kawasaki Z300
- Kawasaki KZ400
- Kawasaki Z750 twin
- Kawasaki KLE500
- Kawasaki W650
- Kawasaki W800
- KTM 790 Duke
- KTM 890 Duke
- MV Agusta 350B Sport
- Norton Commando
- Royal Enfield 700 Meteor
- Royal Enfield 500 Meteor Minor
- Royal Enfield 700 Super Meteor
- Royal Enfield Constellation
- Royal Enfield 750 Interceptor
- Suzuki V-Strom 250
- Suzuki GS500F
- Triumph Bandit
- Triumph Tiger T110
- Triumph Tiger Trail
- Triumph TR6 Trophy
- Yamaha MT-07
- Yamaha XTZ 750 Super Tenere
- Yamaha XT1200Z Super Ténéré
- Yamaha TRX850
- Yamaha TDM900
- Yamaha XS650
- Yamaha YZF-R3
- Yamaha YZF-R7 (2022 bike)

==== Longitudinal ====
- Sunbeam S7 and S8

=== Tandem twin ===
The Tandem Twin is where the cylinders are longitudinal, and have two cranks geared together. A tandem twin is effectively a pair of geared singles, and is to be distinguished from an inline twin. Tandem twins are suitable primarily for two-stroke racers.

==== Longitudinal ====
- Kawasaki KR250 and KR350

== Three cylinder ==
=== Straight three ===
==== Transverse ====
- Benelli Tornado Tre 900
- Benelli TNT 899
- Benelli TNT 1130
- Benelli Tre 1130 K
- BSA Rocket III
- Kawasaki triples
  - S1 Mach I
  - S2 Mach II
  - H1 Mach III
  - H2 Mach IV
- Laverda 1000 3C
- Laverda Jota
- Laverda 1200 TS Mirage
- MV Agusta 500 Three
- MV Agusta F3 (675/800)
- MV Augusta Brutale 800
- Suzuki GT380
- Suzuki GT550
- Suzuki GT750
- Triumph Daytona 675
- Triumph Daytona 955i
- Triumph Legend TT
- Triumph Street Triple
- Triumph Speed Triple
- Triumph Sprint
- Triumph Tiger 800
- Triumph Tiger 1050
- Triumph Tiger Explorer
- Triumph Trident 750
- Yamaha MT-09 (a.k.a. Yamaha FZ-09)
- Yamaha MT-09 Tracer (FJ-09)
- Yamaha XSR900
- Yamaha XSR900 GP
- Yamaha XS 750
- Yamaha XS 850

==== Longitudinal ====
- BMW K75
- Triumph Rocket III
- Triumph Rocket 3

==== Upside Down ====
- Nembo 32

=== V-three ===
==== Transverse ====
- BSL 500 V3
- Honda MVX250F
- Honda NS400R
- Honda NS500

== Four cylinder ==
This is a partial list of some of the many four-cylinder motorcycle designs.

=== Straight four ===
==== Transverse ====
- Benelli BN600/ TNT600i
- BMW S1000RR
- Honda RC181
- Honda CB400SF
- Honda CB400F
- Honda CBR600RR
- Honda CBR650R
- Honda CB750
- Honda CB900c
- Honda CB1000c
- Honda CB1100
- Honda CBR1100XX
- Kawasaki Concours
- Kawasaki 1400GTR
- Kawasaki Eliminator (some models only)
- Kawasaki GPZ900R (a.k.a. Ninja 900)
- Kawasaki Z1
- Kawasaki Z1000
- Kawasaki Z900
- Kawasaki ZRX1100
- Kawasaki ZXR400
- Kawasaki Ninja ZX-10R
- Kawasaki Ninja ZX-25R
- Kawasaki Ninja ZX-4R
- Kawasaki Ninja ZX-12R
- MV Agusta F4 series
- Muench Mammut (Münch)
- Suzuki GSX-R600
- Suzuki GSX-RR
- Suzuki GSX-650F
- Suzuki Hayabusa
- Suzuki 1200 Bandit
- Triumph Speed Four
- Triumph TT600
- Yamaha FZ6 and FZ6R
- Yamaha FZ8 and FAZER8
- Yamaha Zeal FZX250
- Yamaha FZ-600
- Yamaha XJ6
- Yamaha XJ600
- Yamaha XJ750 Maxim
- Yamaha XJR400
- Yamaha YX600 Radian

==== Longitudinal ====
- Ace Motor Corporation fours
- Auto Four
- BMW K1
- BMW K100
- Brough Superior Austin Four
- FN Four
- Indian Four
- Nimbus
- Pierce Four
- Roadog
- Various Henderson Motorcycle fours
- Windhoff 750

=== V-four ===
==== Transverse ====
- Ariel Ace
- Aprilia RSV4
- Aprilia Tuono V4
- BUB Seven Streamliner
- Ducati Apollo
- Ducati Desmosedici RR
- Ducati Panigale V4
- Honda Magna
- Honda RC30
- Honda RC45
- Honda RVF400
- Honda RVF750
- Honda VFR750F
- Honda VF400F
- Honda VF500F
- Honda Sabre V4
- Honda VF1000
- Honda VFR400
- Honda VFR800
- Honda VFR1200F
- Honda VFR1200X
- Matchless Silver Hawk
- Norton V4 RR
- Suzuki Madura
- Suzuki GV1400 Cavalcade
- Yamaha Venture
- Yamaha VMax
- Yamaha Rz-500

==== Longitudinal ====
- Honda ST1100
- Honda ST1300
- Honda CTX1300

==== Oval Piston ====
- Honda NR

=== Flat four ===
==== Longitudinal ====
- Honda Gold Wing
- Suprine Exodus (uses BMW flat four)
- Zündapp K800/KS800
- Wooler 500cc (1948)

=== Square four ===
- Ariel Square Four
- Suzuki RG500
- Suzuki RS67

=== H four ===
==== Transverse ====
- Brough Superior Golden Dream

=== VR-four ===
==== Z-Line ====
- MotoCzysz C1

== Five cylinder ==
=== Straight five ===
==== Transverse ====
- Honda RC148
- Honda RC149

=== V five ===
==== Transverse ====
- Honda RC211V

== Six cylinder ==
=== Straight six ===
==== Transverse ====
- Benelli Sei
- BMW K1600
- Honda RC166
- Honda CBX
- Honda RC series
- Honda RC174
- Horex VR6
- Kawasaki Z1300
- Suzuki Stratosphere

=== Flat six ===
==== Longitudinal ====
- Honda GoldWing
- Honda Rune 2004-2005
- Honda Valkyrie

=== V-six ===
- Laverda V6

== 8 cylinder ==
=== V-8 ===
==== Longitudinal ====
- Aurora V-8 motorcycle
- Bi-Autogo
- Boss Hoss Cycles V8 models
- Curtiss V-8 motorcycle
- Morbidelli V8
- Sabertooth Turbocat
- Olson's Flathead V-8
- Rapom V-8

==== Transverse ====
- Moto Guzzi V8
- PGM V-8

=== Flat 8 ===
- GWM Souo S2000

== 10 cylinder ==
=== V-10 ===
==== Longitudinal ====
- Millyard Viper V10
- Dodge Tomahawk
- Boss Hoss with V-10

== 12 cylinder ==
=== V-12 ===
==== Transverse ====
- Bigtoe
- Olson Zephyr V-12
- Andreas Georgeades' Honda CBX V12

== 48 cylinder ==
=== Transverse ===
- Simon Whitlock's 48-cylinder motorcycle

== Turbocharged and supercharged ==
- Honda CX 500 Turbo / 650 Turbo
- Yamaha XJ 650 Turbo
- Suzuki XN 85 Turbo
- Kawasaki Z 750 Turbo
- Kawasaki Z1R-TC
- Kawasaki Ninja H2
- Kawasaki Ninja H2R

== Wankel ==
The Wankel engine is a type of internal combustion engine using an eccentric rotary design to convert pressure into rotating motion. All parts rotate consistently in one direction, as opposed to the common reciprocating piston engine, which has pistons violently changing direction. It is also known as a rotary engine.

- Hercules (motorcycle)
- Hercules W-2000
- Norton Classic
- Norton Commander (motorcycle)
- Norton F1
- Norton Interpol 2
- Norton RCW588
- Suzuki RE5
- Van Veen (motorcycle)
- Hercules W-2000 (a.k.a. DKW)
- Yamaha RZ201
- Kawasaki X99

== Radial ==
The radial engine is a reciprocating type internal combustion engine configuration in which the cylinders "radiate" outward from a central crankcase like the spokes of a wheel.

- JRL Cycles Radial Chopper
- Radial Hell

=== Rotary radial ===
The rotary engine was an early type of internal combustion engine, usually designed with an odd number of cylinders per row in a radial configuration, in which the crankshaft remained stationary in operation, with the entire crankcase and its attached cylinders rotating around it as a unit.

- Barry Engine
- Millet motorcycle (5 cylinders)
- Megola

== Turbine ==
- Madmax Streetfighter
- MTT Turbine Superbike (a.k.a. Y2K)

== Steam ==
- Bill Barnes's Custom steamer
- Copeland steam bicycle
- De Dion-Bouton steam tricycle
- Geneva steam bicycle
- Hubbard Steamcycle
- Michaux-Perreaux steam velocipede
- Roper steam velocipede
- Stanley Lococycle Model 6 tandem pacer

== Hydrogenation ==
- Kawasaki Ninja H2 HySE
- Xiaomi Segway Apex H2
- MIT's concept fuel cell motorcycle

== Electric ==
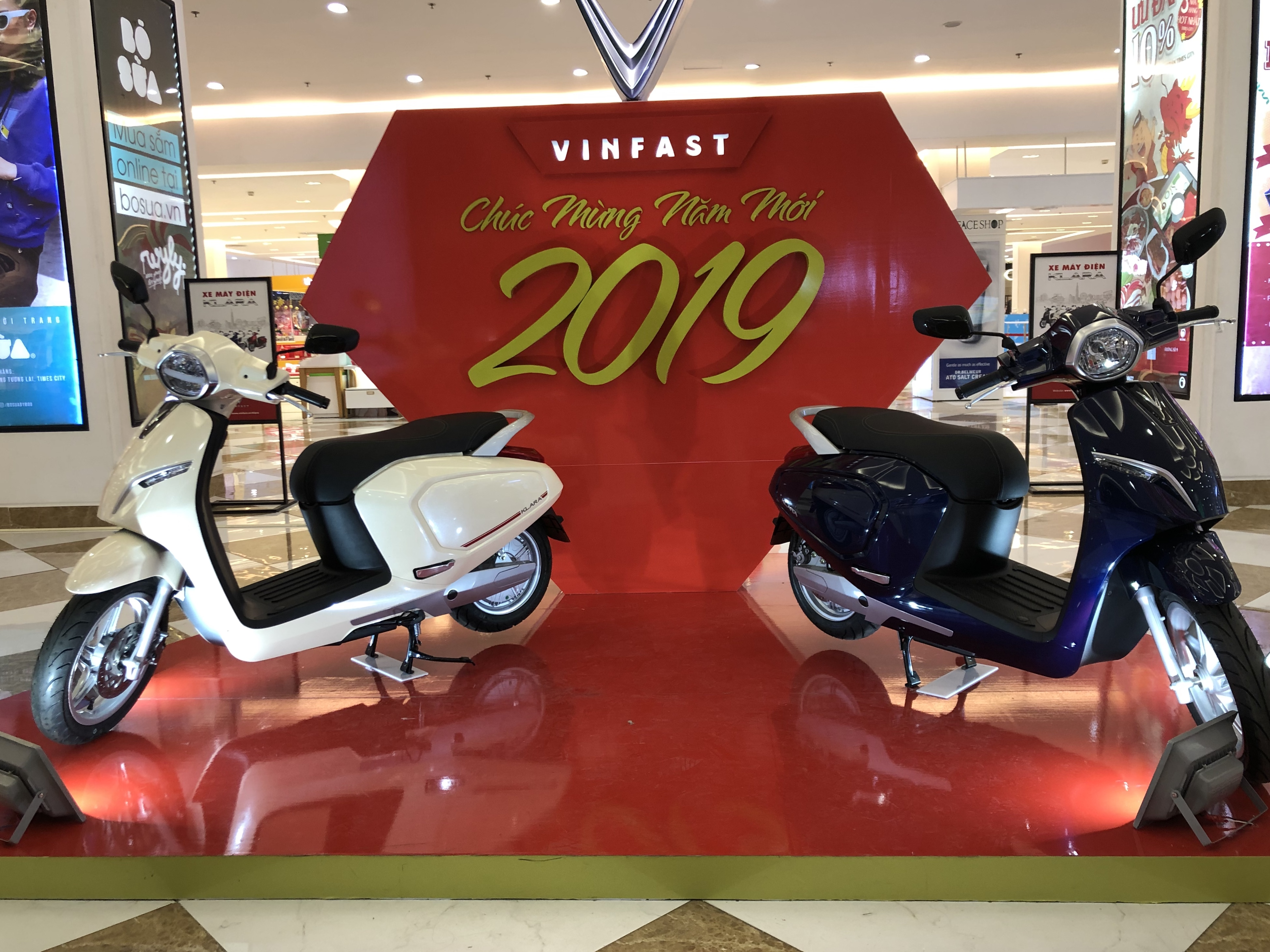
Electric scooters in Vietnam

Electric motorcycles and scooters are plug-in electric vehicles with two or three wheels powered by electricity. The electricity is stored on board in a rechargeable battery, which drives one or more electric motors.

- Agni Motors
- Aptera 2 Series
- Brammo Empulse
- Victory Empulse (after 2015)
- Brammo Enertia
- Čezeta
- Electric dragbike
- Energica Motor Company
- Epeds
- FIM eRoad Racing World Cup
- Harley-Davidson LiveWire
- Johammer J1
- KillaCycle
- Lightning LS-218
- Lit Motors C-1
- Modenas CT series
- MotoCzysz E1pc
- MotoE World Cup
- Peugeot Scoot'Elec
- Piaggio MP3
- Tricyclopod
- TT Zero
- TTXGP
- Uno (dicycle)
- Vectrix
- VinFast Klara
- Yamaha Passol
- Yamaha Tesseract
- Zero Motorcycles
- Zero S
- Zero X
- Zero XU

== Electric scooters ==
=== Emco ===
- Nova

==== NIU ====
- MQi
- NQi
- UQi

==== Piaggio ====
- 1

==== Silence ====
- S01
- S02

==== Super Soco ====
- CUX
- CPx

==== SYM ====
- E-Fiddle IV
- E-Mio
- E-Xpro

==== Unu ====
- Standard Classic
- Scooter Pro

=== Vespa ===
- Elettrica
- Sprint S Elettrica
- Primavera Elettrica

== Diesel ==
Only very small numbers of diesel engined motorcycles have ever been built. The improved fuel efficiency is offset by the increased weight, reduced acceleration and potential difficulty of starting, at least in colder climates.

- Sommer Diesel 462
- Track T-800CDI
- Neander Turbo Diesel
- Star Twin Thunder Star 1200 TDI
- Hero MotoCorp RNT
- Royal Enfield Taurus
- Hayes Diversified Technologies M1030M1 (A modified Kawasaki KLR for the US Army)

== Multi-engine ==
- Gyronaut X-1 two straight two engines
- Triumph Rocket

== Train engine/Inspired by train engine/Other engine ==
Only very small numbers of train/inspired by train/other type engined motorcycles have ever been built.

== See also ==
- Motorcycle motor powered car
- List of motorized trikes
- List of motorcycles of the 1910s
- List of motorcycles of the 1920s
- List of motorcycles of the 1930s
- List of motorcycles of the 1940s
- List of motorcycles of the 1950s
- List of land vehicles types by number of wheels
