= M109 (disambiguation) =

M109 is a self-propelled 155 mm howitzer.

M109 may also refer to:

== Military ==
- HMS Bangor (M109), a Sandown-class minehunter
- Messerschmitt Bf 109, a German World War 2 fighter aircraft
- M109 shop van, a variant of a M35 2½ ton cargo truck

== Other uses ==
- M-109 highway (Michigan), a state highway in Michigan, US
- Messier 109 (M109), a spiral galaxy in the constellation Ursa Major
- Suzuki Boulevard M109R, a motorcycle

== See also ==
- Barrett XM109, an anti-materiel weapon
