= Peugeot Scoot'Elec =

Electric scooter

The Peugeot Scoot'Elec was an electric motor scooter produced by Peugeot in France.

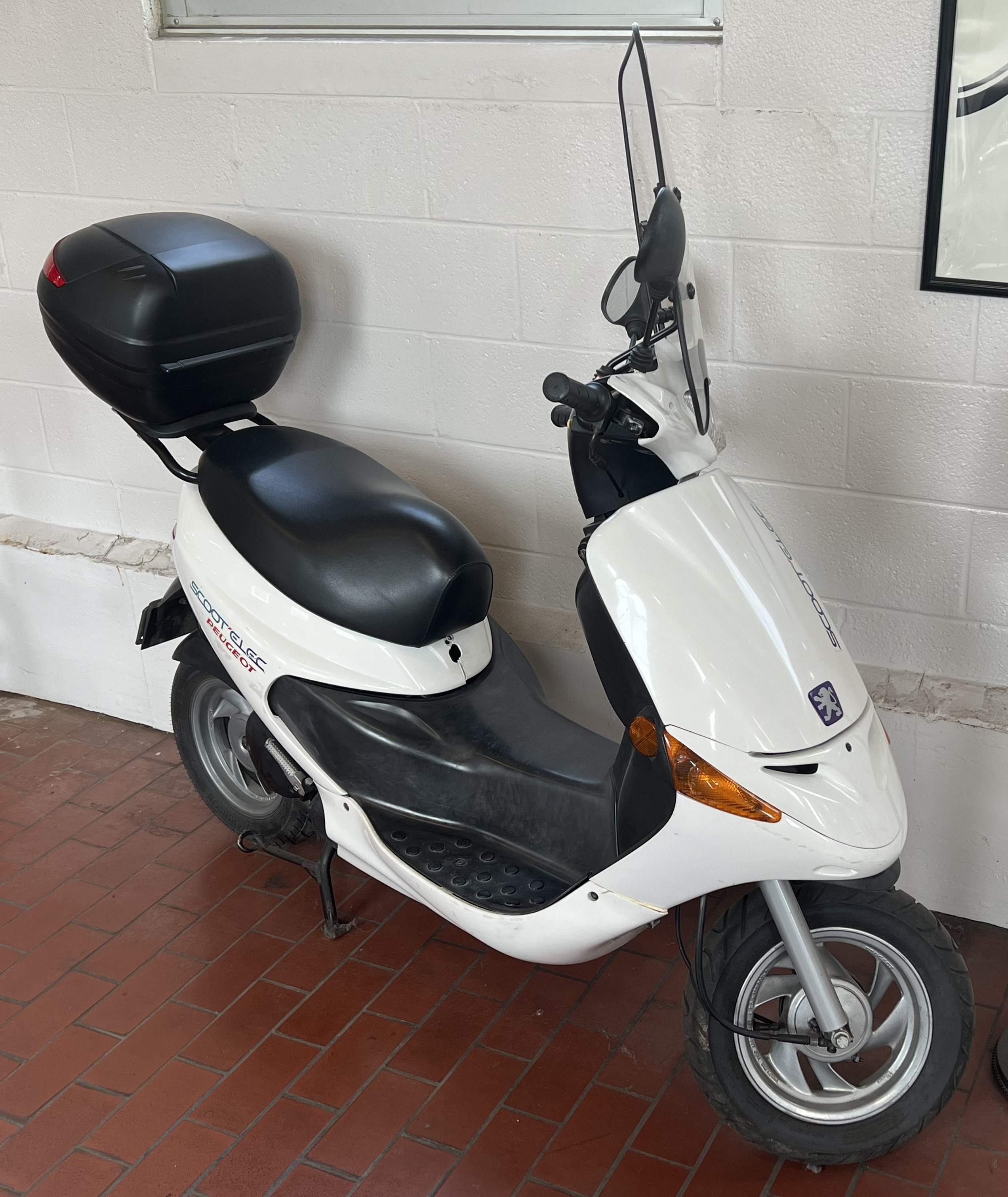
1998 Peugeot Scoot'Elec

Launched in 1996, the Scoot'elec was based on the Zenith, with which it shares body panels and suspension parts. It is powered by a 2.8 kW (3.8 hp) DC motor fed from three Saft nickel-cadmium monoblocs giving an 18 V, 100 A·h battery. Built around a "double cradle", the frame holds the batteries low down between and behind the rider's feet, providing a very low centre of gravity. The electronic controller and onboard charger are housed under the seat.

The scooter weighs 115 kg (254 lb). It has a nominal range of 40 km (25 mi) at 45 km/h (28 mph), but this can be extended by using economy mode, which limits the speed to 30 km/h (19 mph).

The Scoot'Elec was discontinued in 2006; a replacement model, the E-Vivacity, was projected for 2011 release.

== See also ==
- Electric motorcycles and scooters
- List of motorcycles by type of engine
