= Yamaha Tesseract =

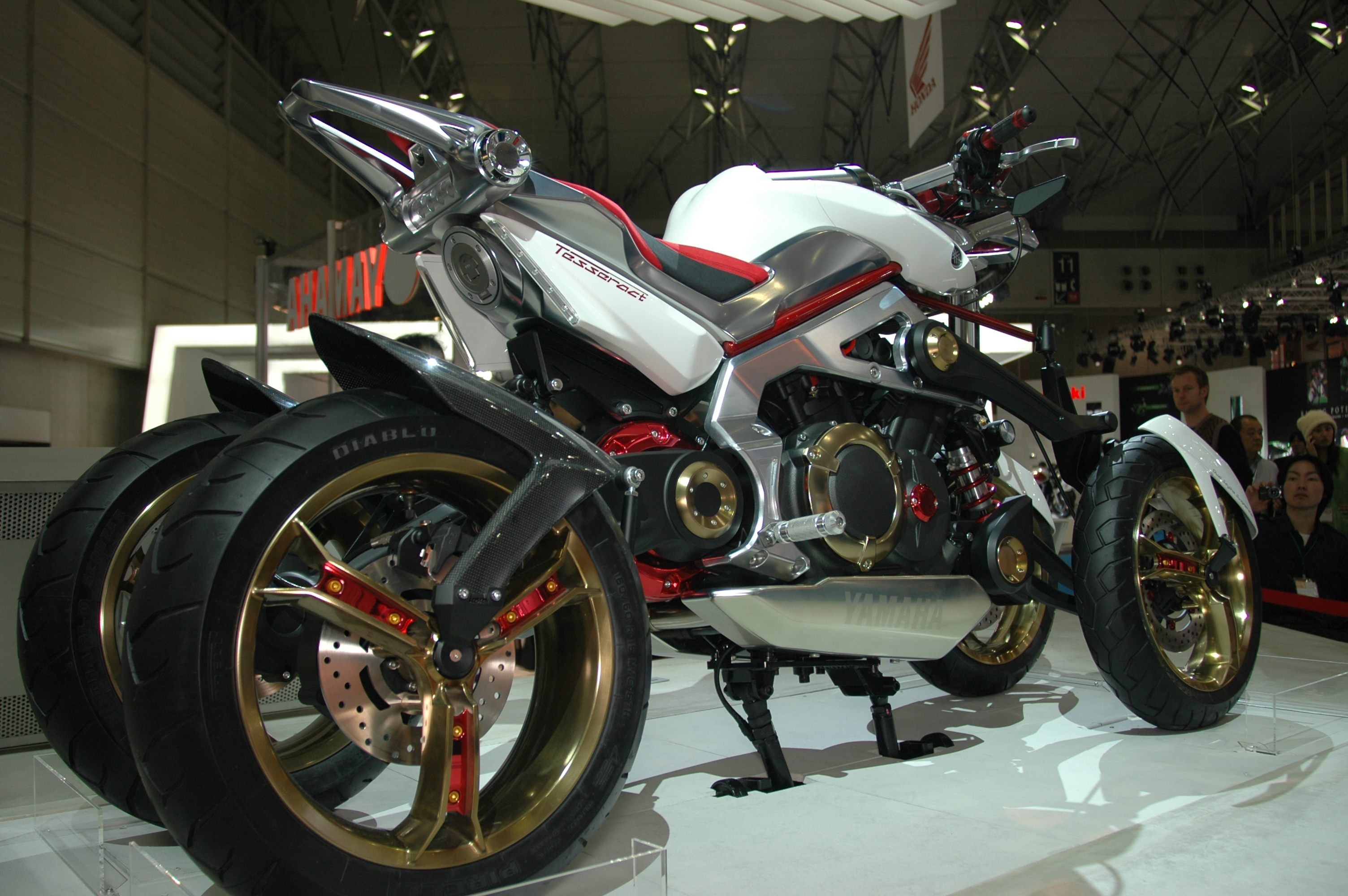
- The Yamaha Tesseract displayed at the 2007 Tokyo Motor Show
- Manufacturer: Yamaha
- Successor: Yamaha Tricity Concept
- Class: Concept vehicle
- Engine: Liquid-cooled, 2 cylinders, V-Twin and an Electric Motor
- Suspension: Dual Scythe
- Dimensions: L: 2,115 mm (83.3 in); W: 720 mm (28 in); H: 1,065 mm (41.9 in)
- Related: 4MC, Quadra4

The Yamaha Tesseract was a hybrid electric concept vehicle introduced by Yamaha at the 2007 Tokyo Motor Show. Although the Tesseract is technically a quadricycle, Yamaha has called it "The 4-Wheeled Motorcycle" because it has a frontal profile nearly as narrow as a conventional motorcycle and because it has a tilting wheel suspension that allows it to bank like a motorcycle. This suspension, which Yamaha refers to as a "Dual Scythe Suspension", is similar to that of the 4MC concept vehicle. Yamaha experienced delays in its own patent filings with the European Patent Office as a result of patents held by the 4MC's inventor, Mike Shotter.

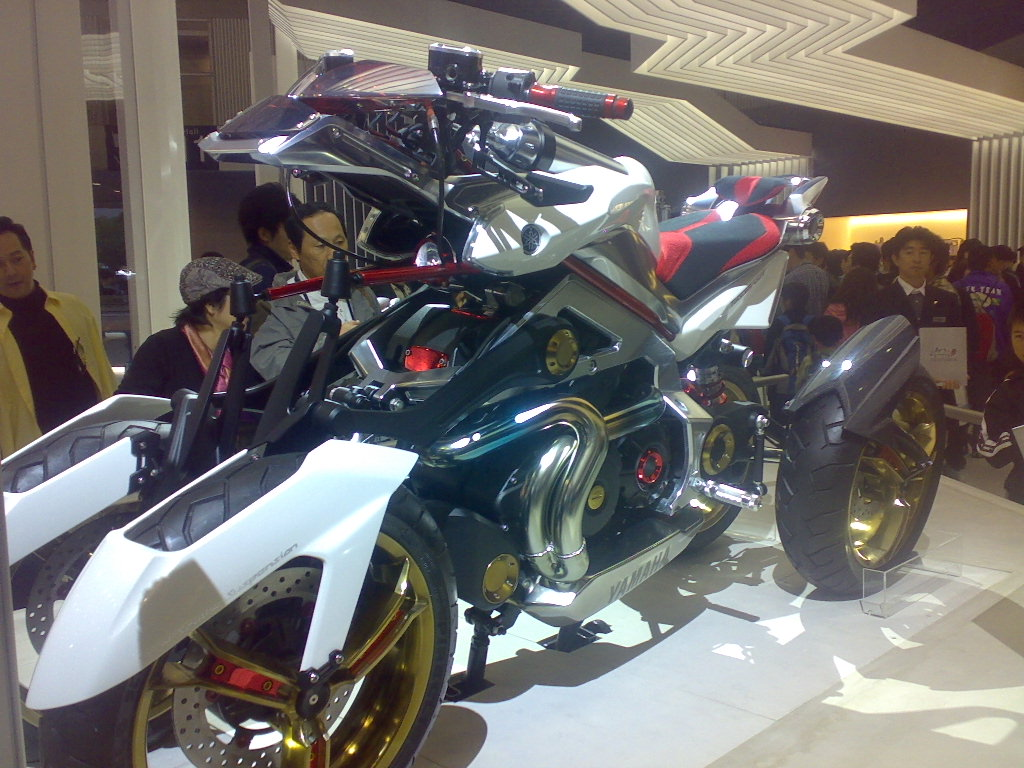

Yamaha's own patent filings indicate that it has continued to develop vehicles similar to the Tesseract

The Tesseract was designed by Luciano Marabese. He and his family founded the Italian company Quadro Tecnologie, which develops similar tilting vehicles, like the Quadro4 (formerly the Quadro 4D Parkour).

== See also ==
- Yamaha Tricity
- Piaggio MP3
- Dodge Tomahawk
