= Suzuki Boulevard M109R =

Suzuki cruiser motorcycle

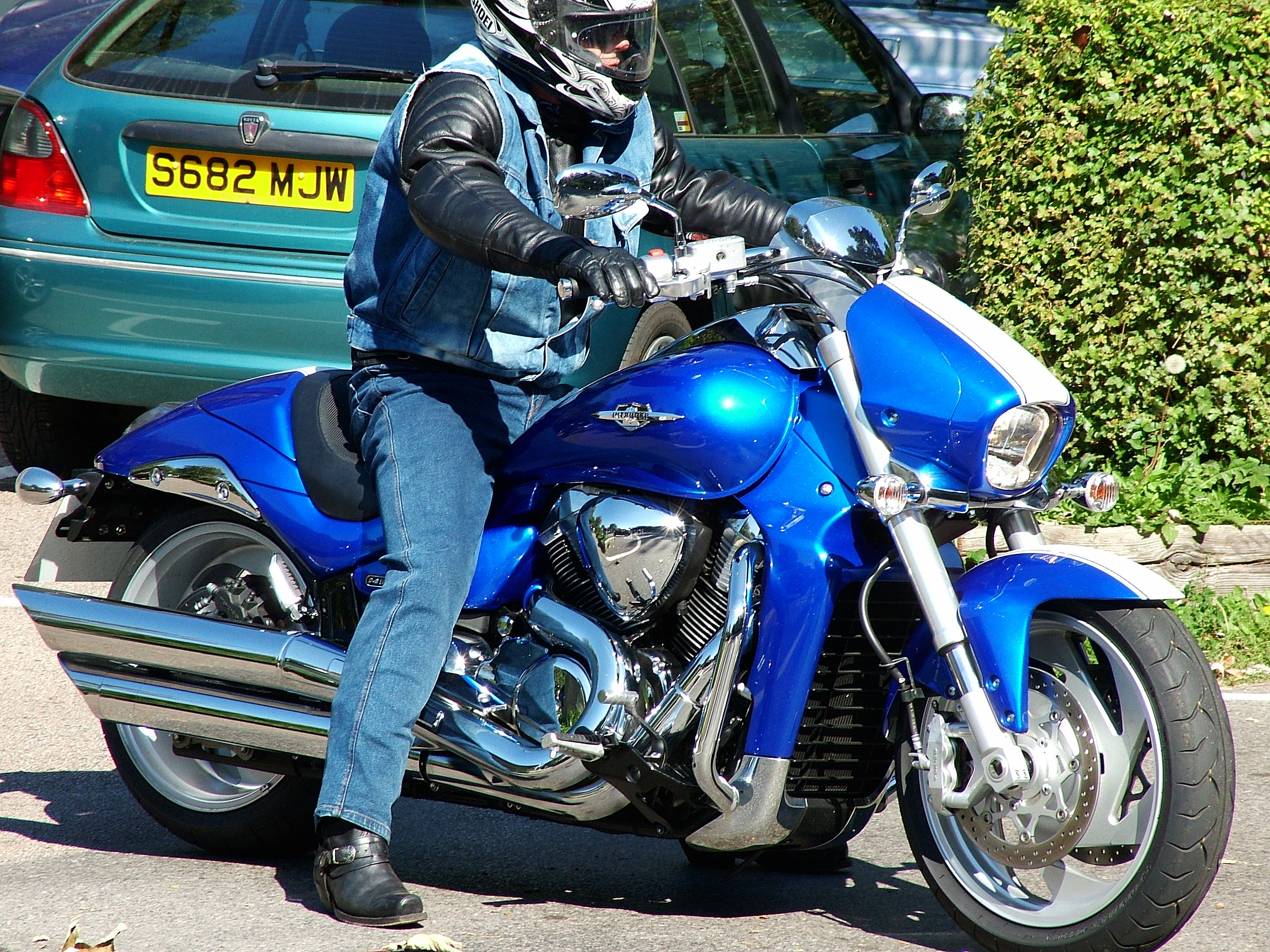
- Manufacturer: Suzuki
- Also called: M109R, Suzuki Intruder M1800R, VZR1800
- Production: 2006–
- Class: Power Cruiser
- Engine: 1783 cc (108.8 cu. in), 4-stroke, 2-cylinder, liquid-cooled, DOHC, 54-degree V-Twin
- Transmission: 5-speed, Shaft
- Suspension: Front Inverted telescopic, coil spring, oil damped Rear Link type, coil spring, oil damped, 7 way adjustable spring pre-load
- Brakes: Front Dual hydraulic disc Rear Single hydraulic disc
- Tires: Front 130/70R18 M/C 63V; Rear 240/40R18 M/C 79V
- Wheelbase: 1710mm (67.3 in.)
- Dimensions: L: 2450mm (96.5 in.); W: 875mm (34.4 in.); H: 1185mm (46.7 in.)
- Seat height: 705mm (27.8 in.)
- Weight: 321 kg (707 lbs) (dry)
- Fuel capacity: 19.5 liter (5.2 gal.)
- Ground clearance: 130mm (5.1 in.)

The Suzuki Boulevard M109R motorcycle was introduced in 2006 as Suzuki's flagship V-twin power cruiser. In some parts of the world, it is marketed as the Suzuki Intruder M1800R; in Europe it is often referred to by its model number, VZR1800.

The engine is a 1,783 cc (108.8 cu in), four-valve DOHC, 54-degree, liquid-cooled, fuel injected V-twin, producing 123 hp (92 kW) and 120 lbf⋅ft (160 N⋅m) of torque.

The cylinder bores are lined with Suzuki's SCEM (Suzuki Composite Electrochemical Material) to aid heat transfer, improve piston-to-cylinder clearances and reduce weight. The engine has electronic fuel injection system with 56 mm throttle bodies and dual spark plugs.

In 2008 Suzuki released the a Boulevard C109R, a "classic cruiser" based on a detuned version of the same engine.

== See also ==
- Suzuki Boulevard C109R
- Suzuki Boulevard M50
