= Suzuki Boulevard C109R =

Suzuki cruiser motorcycle

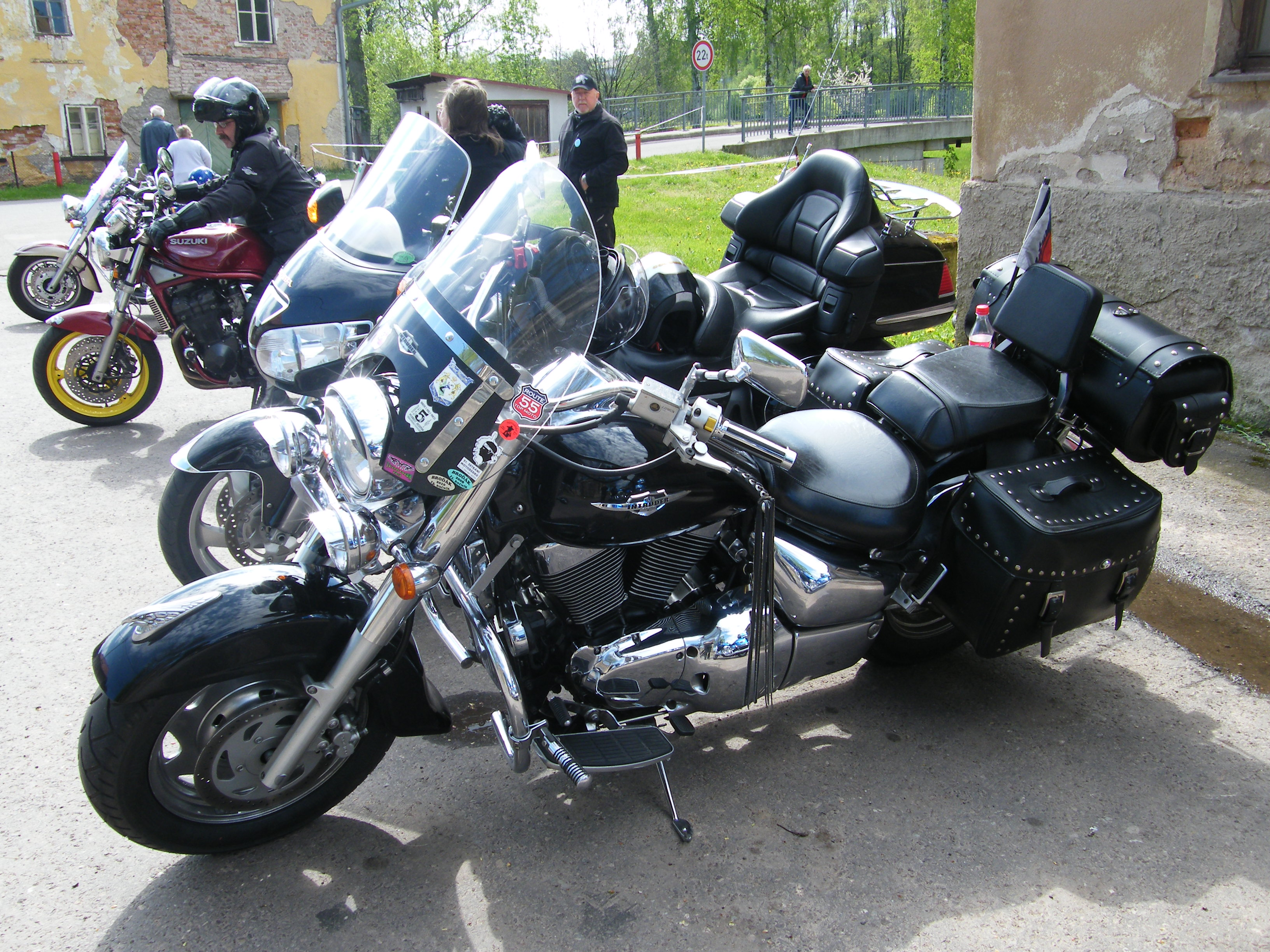
- Manufacturer: Suzuki
- Also called: C109R, C1800R, VLR1800
- Production: since 2008
- Class: Power Cruiser
- Engine: 1,783 cc (108.8 cu in), 4-stroke 54° V-Twin, liquid-cooled, DOHC, 4-valve, fuel Injection, Semi-dry sump
- Bore / stroke: 112.0 mm × 90.5 mm (4.41 in × 3.56 in)
- Top speed: 128 mph (206 km/h)
- Power: 114 hp (85 kW) (claimed) @ 5,800 rpm
- Torque: 116 lbf⋅ft (157 N⋅m) (claimed) @ 3,200 rpm
- Transmission: 5-speed, Shaft
- Suspension: Front 49 mm telescopic fork, Rear single Link type, coil spring
- Tires: Front 150/80R 16M/C 71V; Rear 240/55R 16M/C 86V
- Rake, trail: 31.8°, 131 mm (5.2 in)
- Wheelbase: 1,755 mm (69.1 in)
- Dimensions: L: 2,580 mm (102 in); W: 985 mm (38.8 in); H: 1,150 mm (45 in)
- Seat height: 705 mm (27.8 in)
- Weight: 357 kg (787 lb) (dry); 858 lb (389 kg) (wet)
- Fuel capacity: 19 L (4.2 imp gal; 5.0 US gal)
- Ground clearance: 135 mm (5.3 in)

The Suzuki Boulevard C109R motorcycle was introduced in 2008 as a "classic cruiser" version of Suzuki's Boulevard M109R which had been released two years previously. In Europe the C109R is sold as the Suzuki Intruder C1800R and often referred to by its model number, VLR1800.

The Boulevard C109R and M109R are both "powered by essentially identical engines", a 1,783 cc (108.8 cu in), four-valve DOHC, 54-degree, liquid-cooled, fuel injected V-twin, but the C109R was detuned with a smaller throttle body (52mm instead of 56mm) and shorter valve duration to produce 113 hp (84 kW) and 114 lbf⋅ft (155 N⋅m) of torque instead of the M109R's 123 hp (92 kW), 120 lbf⋅ft (160 N⋅m). There are other differences between the two bikes - the C109R is 12.5 cm (4.9 in) longer, 4.5 cm (1.8 in) wider, its wheelbase is 4 cm (1.6 in) longer and it is 42 kg (93 lb) heavier

The engine bores are lined with Suzuki's SCEM (Suzuki Composite Electrochemical Material) to aid heat transfer, improve piston-to-cylinder clearances and reduce weight. The engine has electronic fuel injection system dual spark plugs. The transmission is five speed.

== See also ==
- Suzuki Boulevard M109R
