= Vespa Primavera =

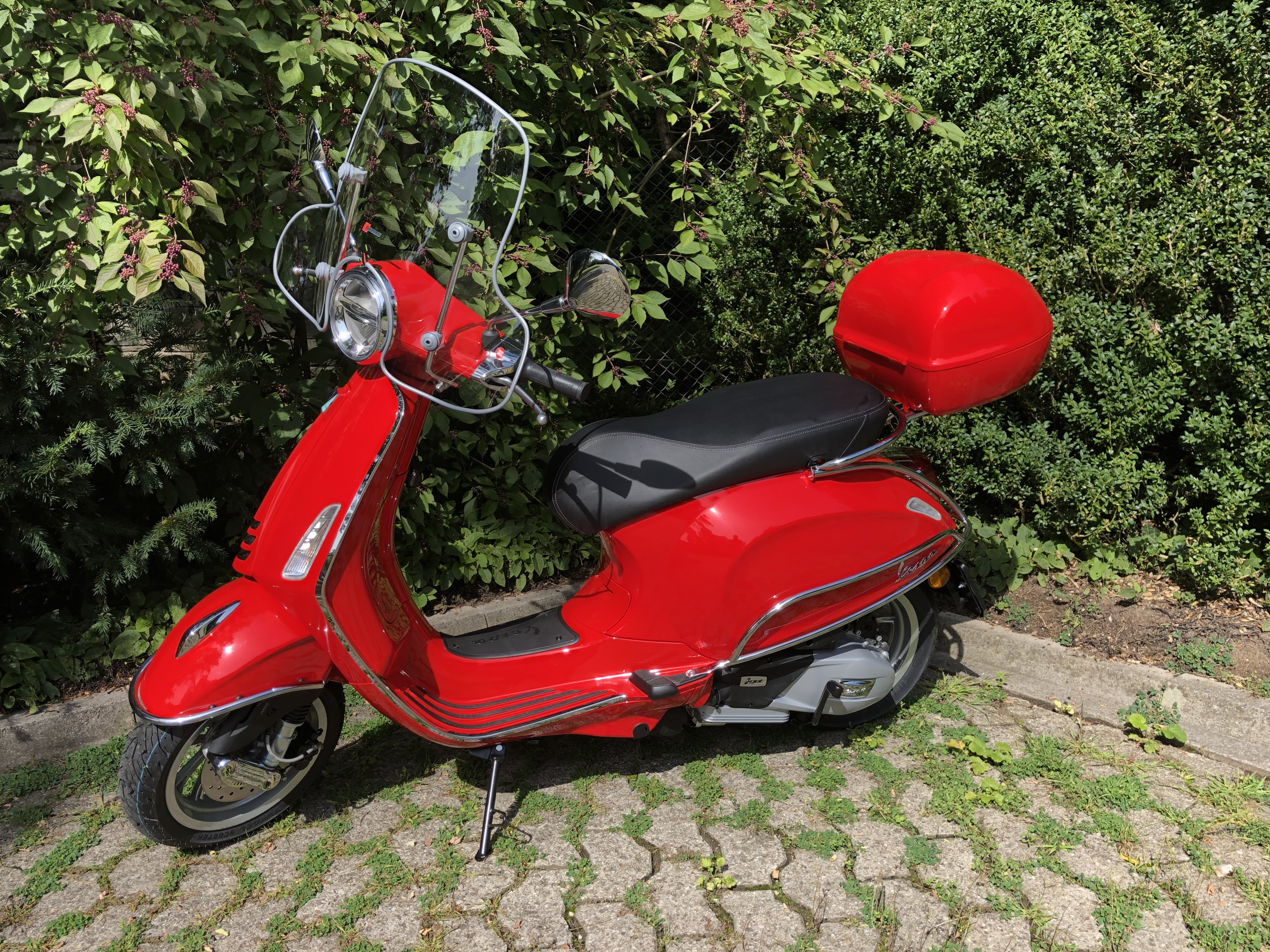
- Manufacturer: Piaggio (Vespa)
- Production: 2013–present
- Assembly: Pontedera, Italy
- Class: Scooter

The Vespa Primavera is a scooter produced by Piaggio under the Vespa brand since 2013. The Vespa Sprint was also derived from the Primavera, a sportier evolution with specific aesthetic details. Both were created to replace the Vespa LX and S.

== History ==
The Vespa Primavera was presented in November 2013 at EICMA and represents the heir to the previous Vespa LX. production in the Pontedera plant started there and at the same time also sales on the European market. For the Asian market, the Primavera is produced in the Vin Puch (Hanoi) plant in Vietnam. The name Primavera pays homage to the homonymous model presented at the motorcycle show in 1967 and produced until 1982.

in 2020 the Primavera Elettrica 45 and 70 were introduced.

== Specifications ==
The Primavera maintains the overall dimensions similar to the previous LX but introduces a completely new chassis with a greater wheelbase (6 cm) combined with the sheet steel bodywork that acts as a load-bearing element. The engine is connected to the body with a two-degree-of-freedom arm system, while the front suspension adopts a new single-arm layout with shock absorber connected to the wheel via an aluminum pin. The battery has been moved to the central side member and the underseat compartment has increased capacity to 16.6 litres. The saddle is 780 mm (31 in) high from the ground.

The braking system is made up of a 200 mm front disc and a 110 mm rear drum on the 50 2T while all the other models mount a 140 mm drum. The front ABS has been optional since 2014 on the 125 and 150 models, while it is not available for the 50 2T model. The front tire measures 110/70 R11, the rear 120/70 R11.

Aesthetically, the Primavera was designed by the Piaggio style center led by Marco Lambri, taking up both elements from the historic Primavera of 1968 and from the recent 946 and has all LED direction indicators and position lights.

== Variants ==
=== 50th Anniversary ===
The 50th Anniversary model presented at EICMA 2017 commemorates the historic Primavera which made its debut exactly fifty years earlier at the same Milan show in 1967 to be marketed in 1968. Available from April 2018 with the 50 cm^{3} 4T and 125 cm^{3} 4T i-get engines, it stands out for the brand new Light Blue and Brown colors with coordinated saddle, for the elegant gray finish of the five-spoke rims and naturally for the logo that elegantly marks the back of the shield.

=== Primavera Yacht Club ===
The Yacht Club was presented on 23 July 2018 and offered in 50 and 125 cm^{3} displacements and features white paintwork with blue details, matt blue rims with diamond-cut finish, specific rubber inserts on the footboard and saddle with specific stitching and finishes.

=== Primavera Sean Wotherspoon ===
Made in a limited edition in collaboration with artist Sean Wotherspoon, it has a 125 cm^{3} engine and a specific livery. This model went on sale in June 2020 and has the standard front luggage rack.

=== 75th Anniversary ===
Presented in March 2021 and launched on the market in April, this model celebrates the 75th anniversary of the Vespa and stands out

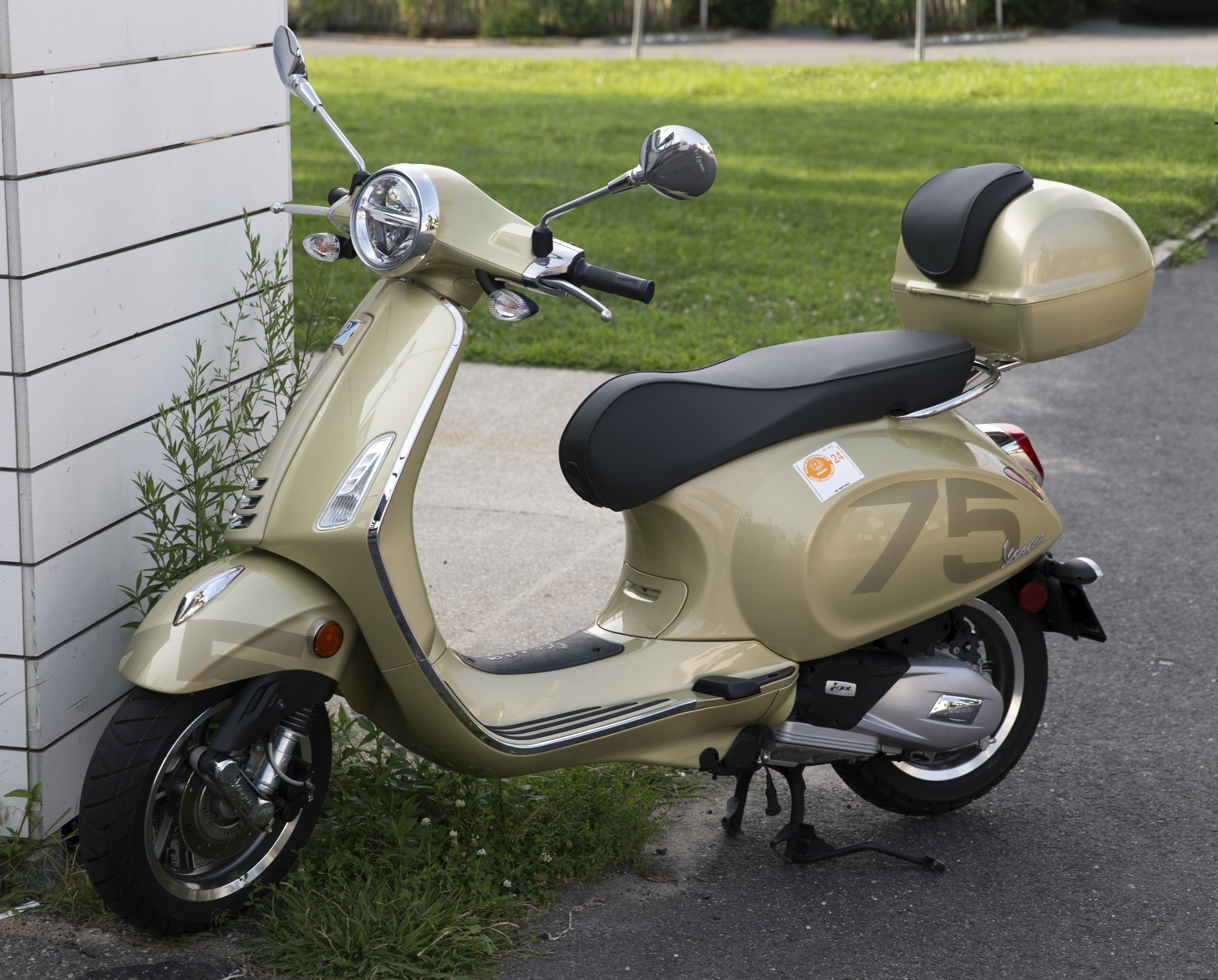
Vespa Primavera 75th

for its brand-new 75th Yellow metallic colour, specific saddle with piping, gray painted rims with diamond-cut edges and chrome details as well as accessories.

=== Primavera Pic Nic ===
The Pic Nic was presented on 4 July 2022 and features as standard the chromed rear and front racks, a removable cooler bag and a rear woven basket, as well as a water resistant canvas. The body colors are Pic Nic Green and Pic Nic Gray with graphics on the sides, dedicated two-tone saddle and gray painted rims with diamond-cut edges. The engines available are the 50 and 125 i-get.

=== 80th Anniversary ===
Presented in November 2025 at EICMA and on the market in June 2026 (preorders from March) to coincide with the Vespa World Day celebration in Rome of the 80th Anniversary of the first Vespa. both 125 and 150 models stand out with its Verde Pastello Livery

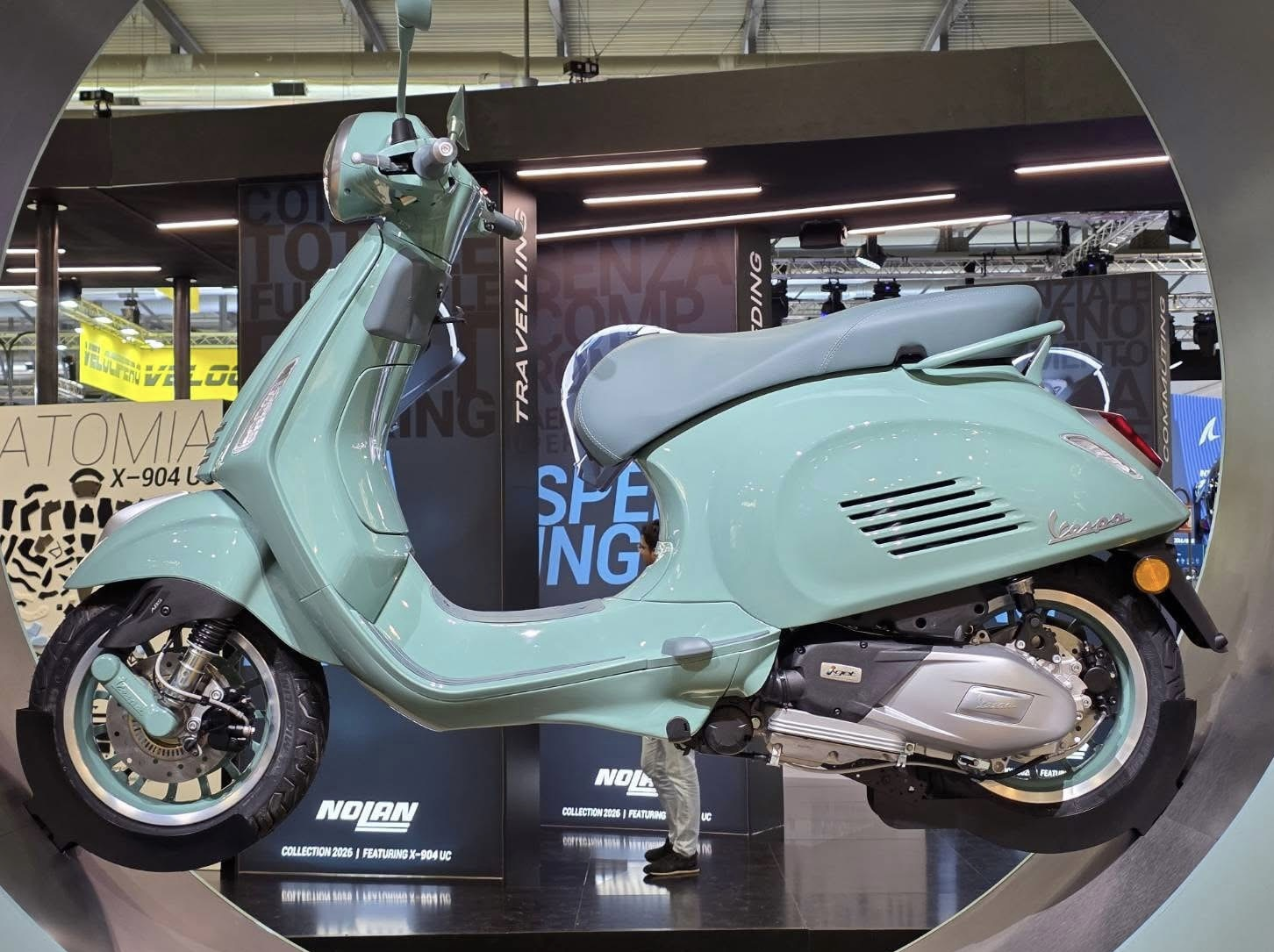
Vespa Primavera 80th 2026

and bespoke badging.

=== Officina 8 ===
Released in June 2025 for the Primavera 50, 125 & 150 models in celebration of the original post-war "Workshop 8" inside Piaggio's Pontedera factory each model gets matte Blu Officina 8 livery, satin metal details in aluminium and brass, diamond-cut wheels, and bespoke badging inspired by the pins worn by Piaggio's original development team.

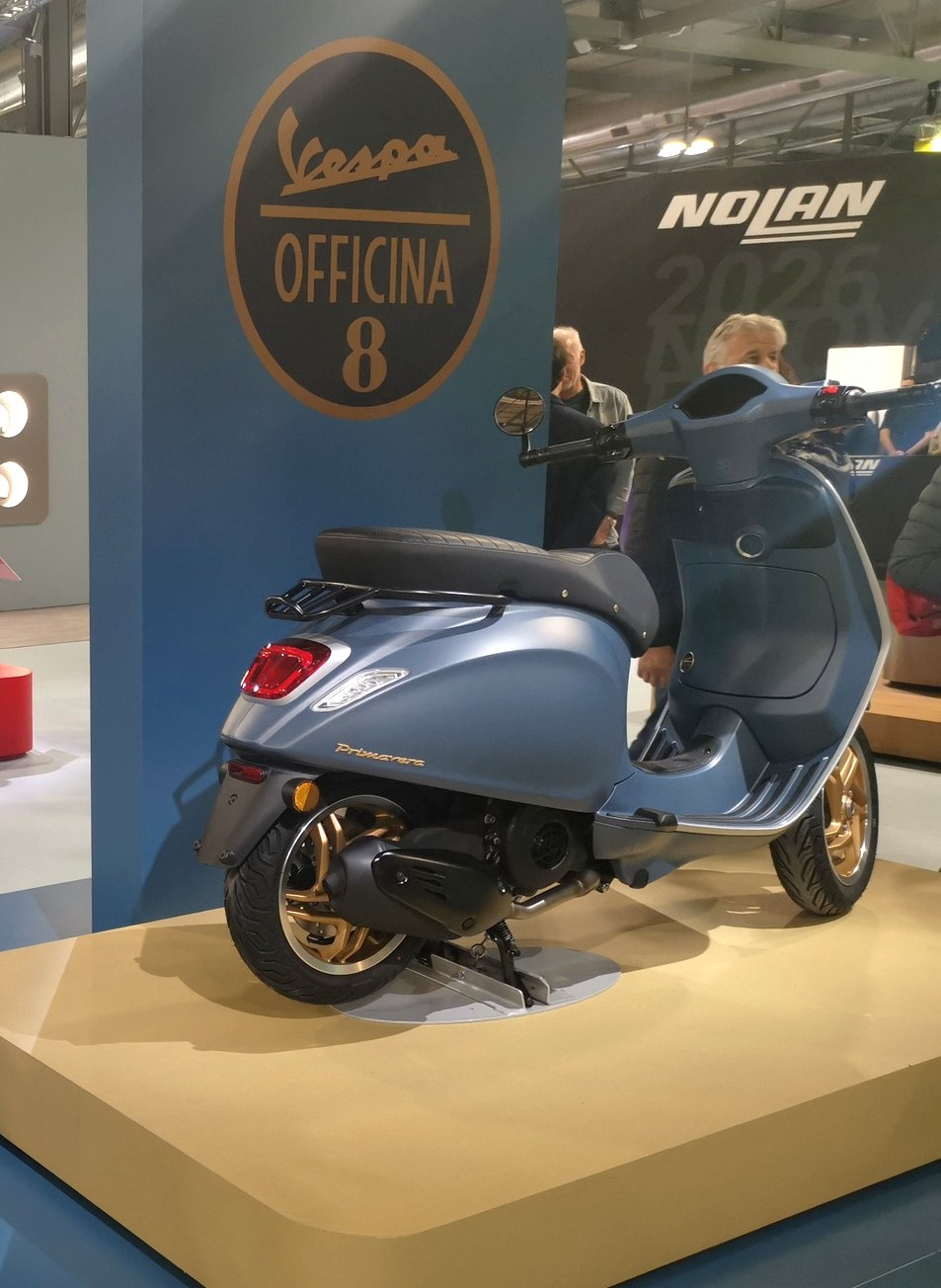
Vespa Primavera Officina 8

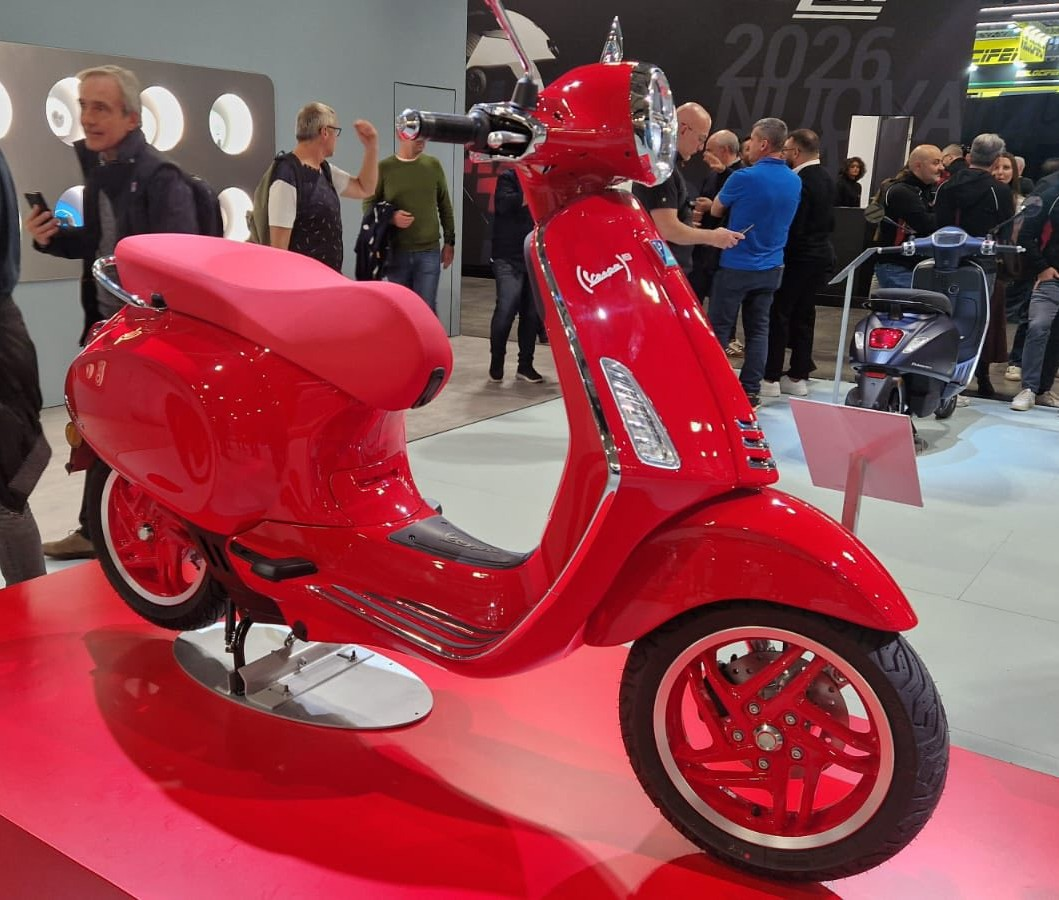
Vespa Primavera Red

=== Red ===
In Partnership with charity The Primavera Red range was introduced they included 50,125,150, Elettrica 45 70 models.

=== Disney Mickey Mouse Edition ===
in 2023 Celebrations of the Disney100 anniversary included a global collaboration of the two brands with the Disney Mickey Mouse Edition by Vespa.the scooter iscoloured black, red, white and yellow – the same hues that characterise Walt Disney's most famous mouse.

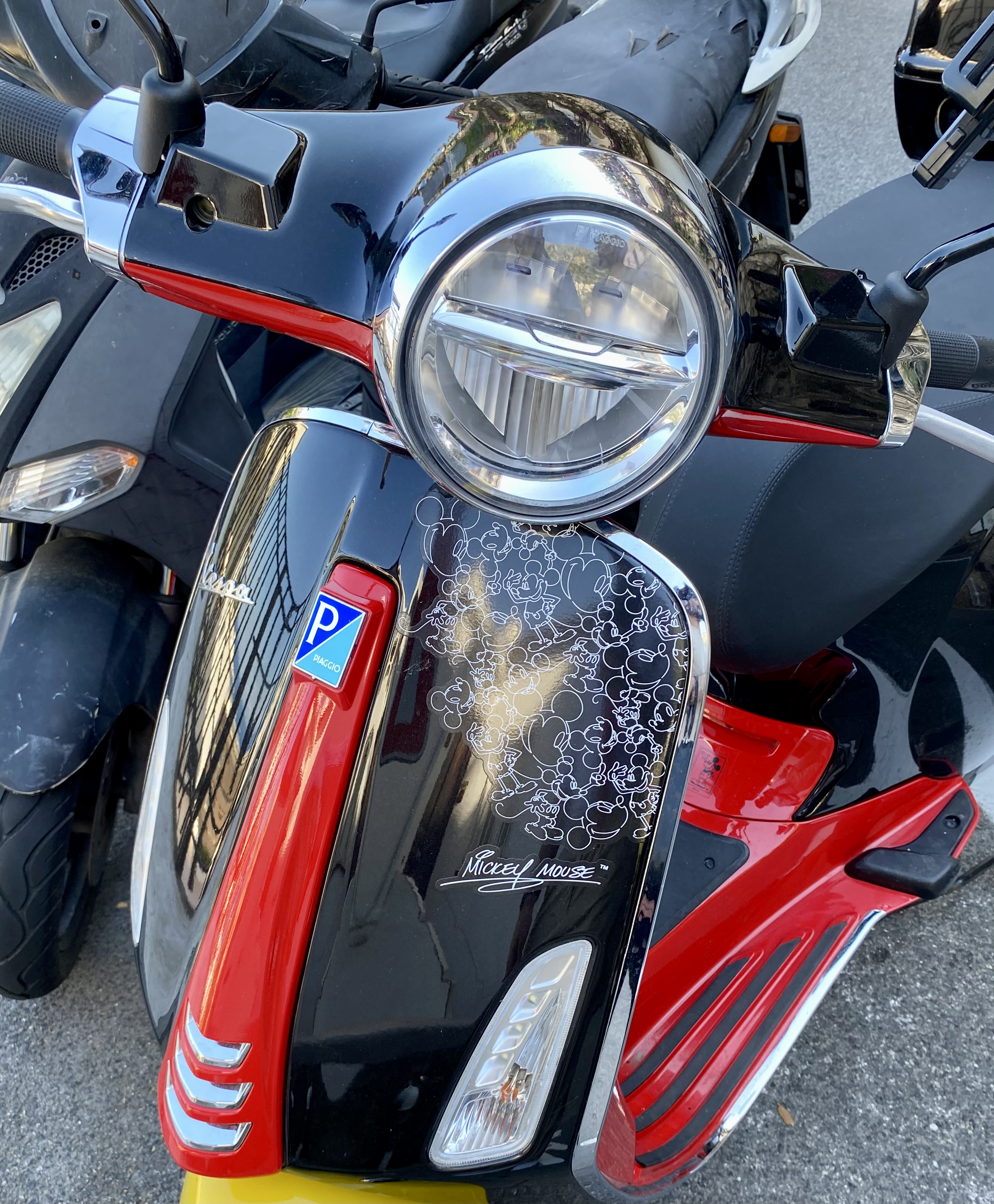
Vespa Primavera 125 Disney Mickey Mouse

The yellow wheels are reminiscent of Mickey Mouse's shoes, while the black mirrors recall his unmistakable round ears. A graphic pattern outlining the character's silhouette decorates both sides of the scooter as well as the front. Finally, Mickey Mouse's signature could not be missed, featured on both the saddle and the front shell.

=== Color Vibe ===
Introduced in 2023 for the Asia Pacific region, Two models with two tone livery were released. The body was offered in the Orange Tramonto and Blue Audaceand paired with side graphics and a footboard in Blue and Orange.

=== Batik ===
Released as a 2024 special edition in a single base color, Verde Amabilethe vespa is paired with a Tambal Jagad design comprising seven distinct motifs, each representing an island of the Indonesian archipelago and symbolising different virtues. The result is an immersion in the turquoise and white hues of a tropical beach, with sinuous lines that represent waves

=== Touring ===
The Touring version includes all the changes and upgrades of the Vespa Primavera starting with the 12″ twin wheels, and is enriched by chromed front luggage rack and rear luggage racks. The dedicated seat and elegant top fairing are also part of its Touring equipment.

== Specifications ==
| == Vespa Sprint == | Primavera 50 2t | Primavera 50 Touring | Primavera 50 | Primavera 125 | Primavera 125 Touring | Primavera 150 | Primavera 150 Touring | Primavera 125 70th | Primavera 125 Red | Primavera 125 50th | Primavera 50 2nd Series | Primavera 50 Yacht Club | Primavera 50 Touring 2nd Series | Primavera 50 Sport | Primavera 125 Yacht Club | Primavera 125 2nd Series | Primavera 125 Touring 2nd series | Primavera 125 Sport | Primavera 150 Sport 2nd Series | Primavera 150 Touring 2nd Series |
|---|---|---|---|---|---|---|---|---|---|---|---|---|---|---|---|---|---|---|---|---|
| Years in Production | 2014-2018 | 2014-2018 | 2014-2018 | 2014-2018 | 2014-2018 | 2014-2018 | 2014-2018 | 2016-2018 | 2018- | 2018-2019 | 2019- | 2019-21 | 2019- | 2019- | 2019-21 | 2019- | 2019- | 2019- | 2019- | 2019- |
| Chassis Number Prefix | | | | | | | | | | | | | | | | | | | | |
| Engine Type | Air-cooled, single-cylinder, two-stroke engine | Air-cooled, single-cylinder, two-stroke engine | Air-cooled, single-cylinder, two-stroke engine | Air-cooled, single-cylinder, Four-stroke engine | Air-cooled, single-cylinder, Four-stroke engine | Air-cooled, single-cylinder, Four-stroke engine | Air-cooled, single-cylinder, Four-stroke engine | Air-cooled, single-cylinder, Four-stroke engine | Air-cooled, single-cylinder, Four-stroke engine | Air-cooled, single-cylinder, Four-stroke engine | Air-cooled, single-cylinder, two-stroke engine | Air-cooled, single-cylinder, two-stroke engine | Air-cooled, single-cylinder, two-stroke engine | Air-cooled, single-cylinder, two-stroke engine | Air-cooled, single-cylinder, Four-stroke engine | Air-cooled, single-cylinder, Four-stroke engine | Air-cooled, single-cylinder, Four-stroke engine | Air-cooled, single-cylinder, Four-stroke engine | Air-cooled, single-cylinder, Four-stroke engine | Air-cooled, single-cylinder, Four-stroke engine |
| Engine Capacity | 49cc | 49cc | 49cc | 124.5cc | 124.5cc | 154.8cc | 154.8cc | 124.5cc | 124.5cc | 124.5cc | 49cc | 49cc | 49cc | 49cc | 124.5cc | 124.5cc | 124.5cc | 124.5cc | 154.8cc | 154.8cc |
| Bore x Stroke (mm) | 40 x 39.3mm | 39 x 41.8 mm | 39 x 41.8 mm | 52.0 x 58.6 mm | 52.0 x 58.6 mm | 58 x 58.6 mm | 58 x 58.6 mm | 52.0 x 58.6 mm | 52.0 x 58.6 mm | 52.0 x 58.6 mm | 39 x 41.8 mm | 39 x 41.8 mm | 39 x 41.8 mm | 39 x 41.8 mm | 52.0 x 58.6 mm | 52.0 x 58.6 mm | 52.0 x 58.6 mm | 52.0 x 58.6 mm | 58 x 58.6 mm | 58 x 58.6 mm |
| Power in kW (BHP) | 4.4 hp @ 6500rpm | 4.4 hp @ 6500rpm | 4.4 hp @ 6500rpm | 8 hp @ 7700rpm | 8 hp @ 7700rpm | 12.9 Hp @7750rpm | 12.9 Hp @7750rpm | 10.7 Hp @7700rpm | 8 hp @ 7700rpm | 10.7 Hp @7700rpm | 4.4 hp @ 6500rpm | 4.4 hp @ 6500rpm | 4.4 hp @ 6500rpm | 4.4 hp @ 6500rpm | 8 hp @ 7700rpm | 8 hp @ 7700rpm | 8 hp @ 7700rpm | 8 hp @ 7700rpm | 9.5 Hp @7750rpm | 9.5 Hp @7750rpm |
| Torque (Nm) | | | | 10.7 nm / 6000 rpm | 10.7 nm / 6000 rpm | 12.4 nm / 6500 rpm | 12.4 nm / 6500 rpm | 10.4 nm / 6000 rpm | 10.7 nm / 6000 rpm | 10.4 nm / 6000 rpm | | | | | 10.7 nm / 6000 rpm | 10.7 nm / 6000 rpm | 10.7 nm / 6000 rpm | 10.7 nm / 6000 rpm | 12.9 nm / 6500 rpm | 12.9 nm / 6500 rpm |
| Transmission | Continuously variable automatic | | | | | | | | | | | | | | | | | | | |
| Top Speed | 40 km/h | 40 km/h | 40 km/h | 100 km/h | 100 km/h | 100 km/h | 100 km/h | 100 km/h | 100 km/h | 100 km/h | 40 km/h | 40 km/h | 40 km/h | 40 km/h | 100 km/h | 100 km/h | 100 km/h | 100 km/h | 100 km/h | 100 km/h |
| Price | €2,800 | €2,850 | €2,900 | €3,800 | €3,900 | €3,900 | €4,000 | €4,470 | €5,120 | €6,510 | €3,450 | €3,580 | €3,580 | €3,530 | €4,590 | €4,440 | €4,690 | €4,940 | €5,140 | €4,990 |
| Production | | | | | | | | | | | | | | | | | | | | |
| Colours | Light blue, red, white, dark blue, brown | Light blue, red, white, dark blue, brown | Silk Grey | Light blue, red, white, dark blue, brown | Silk Grey | Light blue, red, white, dark blue, brown | Silk Grey | Light blue, grey | Red | Light blue, Titanium grey | Black, green, red, white, blue | White | Dark green, amaranth | Red, blue, beige | White | Blue, green, red, white, black | Dark green, amaranth | Red, blue, beige | Red, blue, beige | Dark green, amaranth |
| Weight | 98 kg | 98 kg | 98 kg | 106 Kg | 106 Kg | 106 Kg | 106 Kg | 106 Kg | 106 Kg | 106 Kg | 98 kg | 98 kg | 98 kg | 98 kg | 106 Kg | 106 Kg | 106 Kg | 106 Kg | 106 Kg | 106 Kg |
| Fuel Capacity | 7 Litres | 7 Litres | 7 Litres | 8 Litres | 8 Litres | 8 Litres | 8 Litres | 8 Litres | 8 Litres | 8 Litres | 7 Litres | 7 Litres | 7 Litres | 7 Litres | 8 Litres | 8 Litres | 8 Litres | 8 Litres | 8 Litres | 8 Litres |

| == Vespa Sprint == | Primavera 150 2nd Series | Primavera 150 Touring 2nd Series | Primavera 150 Wotherspoon | Primavera 150 75th Anniversario | Primavera 150 Color Vibe | Primavera 50 Pic Nic | Primavera 50 Color Vibe | Primavera 50 Red | Primavera 50 Wotherspoon | Primavera 50 75th Anniversario | Primavera 125 Sean Wotherspoon | Primavera 125 75th Anniversario | Primavera 125 Pic Nic | Primavera 125 Color Vibe |
|---|---|---|---|---|---|---|---|---|---|---|---|---|---|---|
| Years in Production | 2019- | 2019- | 2020-2022 | 2021-2022 | 2023- | 2023- | 2023- | 2020- | 2020-2022 | 2021-2022 | 2020-2022 | 2021-2022 | 2023- | 2023- |
| Chassis Number Prefix | | | | | | | | | | | | | | |
| Engine Type | Air-cooled, single-cylinder, Four-stroke engine | Air-cooled, single-cylinder, Four-stroke engine | Air-cooled, single-cylinder, Four-stroke engine | Air-cooled, single-cylinder, Four-stroke engine | Air-cooled, single-cylinder, Four-stroke engine | Air-cooled, single-cylinder, two-stroke engine | Air-cooled, single-cylinder, two-stroke engine | Air-cooled, single-cylinder, two-stroke engine | Air-cooled, single-cylinder, two-stroke engine | Air-cooled, single-cylinder, two-stroke engine | Air-cooled, single-cylinder, Four-stroke engine | Air-cooled, single-cylinder, Four-stroke engine | Air-cooled, single-cylinder, Four-stroke engine | Air-cooled, single-cylinder, Four-stroke engine |
| Engine Capacity | 154.8cc | 154.8cc | 154.8cc | 154.8cc | 154.8cc | 49cc | 49cc | 49cc | 49cc | 49cc | 124.5cc | 124.5cc | 124.5cc | 124.5cc |
| Bore x Stroke (mm) | 58 x 58.6 mm | 58 x 58.6 mm | 58 x 58.6 mm | 58 x 58.6 mm | 58 x 58.6 mm | 39 x 41.8 mm | 39 x 41.8 mm | 39 x 41.8 mm | 39 x 41.8 mm | 39 x 41.8 mm | 52.0 x 58.6 mm | 52.0 x 58.6 mm | 52.0 x 58.6 mm | 52.0 x 58.6 mm |
| Power in kW (BHP) | 9.5 Hp @7750rpm | 9.5 Hp @7750rpm | 9.5 Hp @7750rpm | 9.5 Hp @7750rpm | 9.5 Hp @7750rpm | 4.4 hp @ 6500rpm | 4.4 hp @ 6500rpm | 4.4 hp @ 6500rpm | 4.4 hp @ 6500rpm | 4.4 hp @ 6500rpm | 8 hp @ 7700rpm | 8 hp @ 7700rpm | 8 hp @ 7700rpm | 8 hp @ 7700rpm |
| Torque (Nm) | 12.9 nm / 6500 rpm | 12.9 nm / 6500 rpm | 12.9 nm / 6500 rpm | 12.9 nm / 6500 rpm | 12.9 nm / 6500 rpm | | | | | | 10.7 nm / 6000 rpm | 10.7 nm / 6000 rpm | 10.7 nm / 6000 rpm | 10.7 nm / 6000 rpm |
| Transmission | Continuously variable automatic | | | | | | | | | | | | | |
| Top Speed | 100 km/h | 100 km/h | 100 km/h | 100 km/h | 100 km/h | 40 km/h | 40 km/h | 40 km/h | 40 km/h | 40 km/h | 100 km/h | 100 km/h | 100 km/h | 100 km/h |
| Price | €4,640 | €4,990 | €5,520 | €5,340 | €6,100 | €4,080 | €4,900 | €4,100 | €4,080 | €4,080 | €5,280 | €5,130 | €5,950 | €6,000 |
| Production | | | | | | | | | | | | | | |
| Colours | Blue, grey, red, white, black | Dark green, amaranth | Multicoloured | Metallic Yellow | Orange / blue, White/ blue | Light grey, light green | Orange / blue, White/ blue | Red | Multicoloured | Metallic Yellow | Multicoloured | Metallic Yellow | Light grey, light green | Orange / blue, White/ blue |
| Weight | 106 Kg | 106 Kg | 106 Kg | 106 Kg | 106 Kg | 98 kg | 98 kg | 98 kg | 98 kg | 98 kg | 106 Kg | 106 Kg | 106 Kg | 106 Kg |
| Fuel Capacity | 8 Litres | 8 Litres | 8 Litres | 8 Litres | 8 Litres | 7 Litres | 7 Litres | 7 Litres | 7 Litres | 7 Litres | 8 Litres | 8 Litres | 8 Litres | 8 Litres |
