= Epeds =

UK electric scooter company

Epeds electric scooter
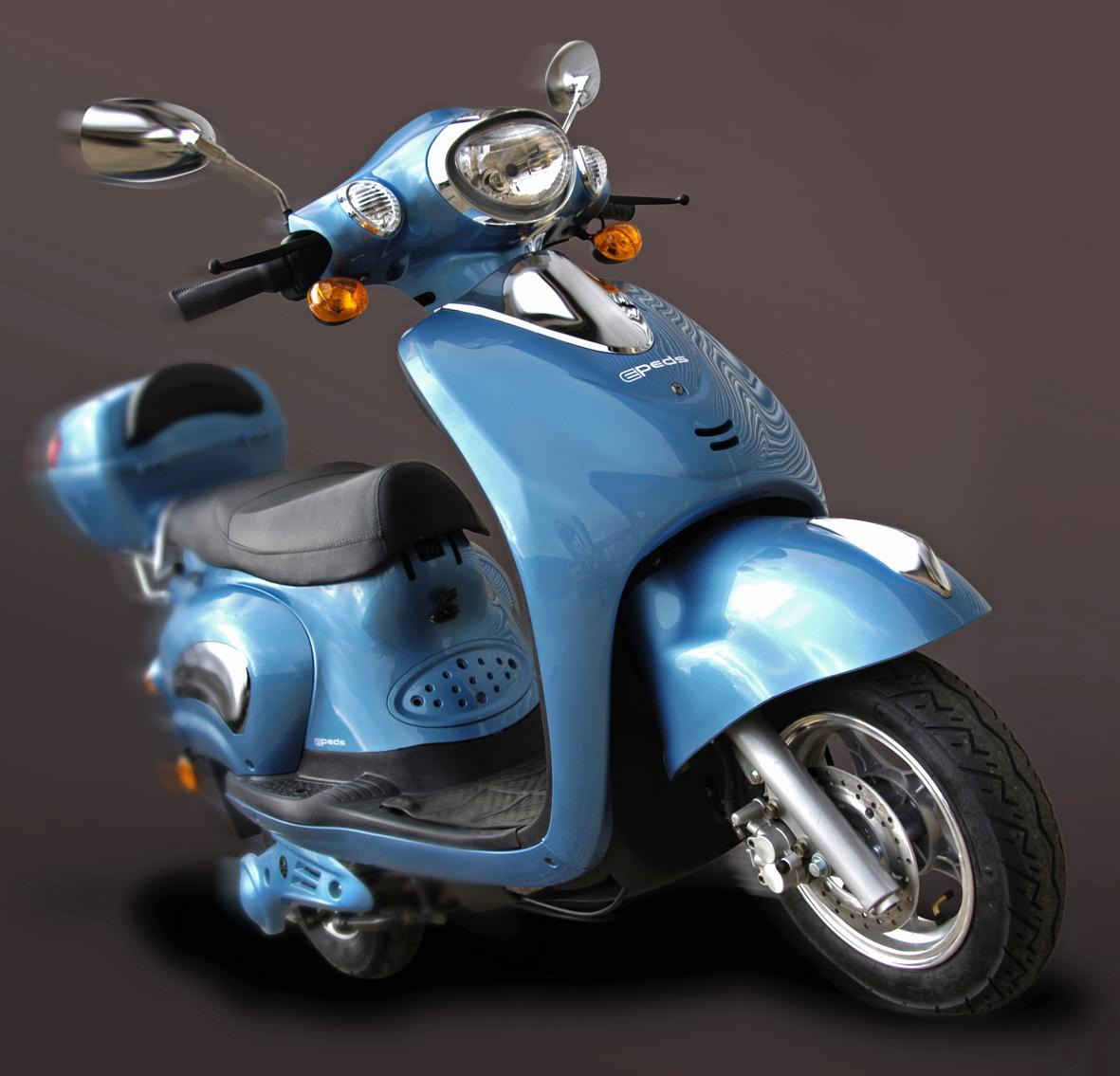
- Manufacturer: Epeds UK Ltd
- Class: Electric scooter
- Engine: Brushless DC motor
- Top speed: 70 km/h (43 mph)
- Power: 1,200 W (1.6 hp) from 60V
- Brakes: Front twin piston hydraulic disks and rear drum brake
- Wheelbase: 1,330 mm (52 in)

Epeds UK Ltd are an electric scooter company based in Poole, Dorset. Its vehicles are constructed in Zhejiang, China for retail through local UK dealers.

== Scooters ==
Eped electric scooters are available in two distinct styles, the Eped City and Eped Sport. Both of which run off identical components, with any performance differences attesting to the individual products design.

The Eped City is an electric version of a petrol scooter, the sachs bee. The Eped Sport is a slightly lighter and more manoeuvrable product with a more contemporary design

In the United Kingdom, Epeds Scooters are exempt from paying Road Tax. Epeds scooters use crystal technology batteries with a manufacturer-claimed life of 400 full recharges. The 60 volt battery pack has a 20ah capacity and can be fully recharged in 5–8 hours from a standard domestic power socket.

== Crystal technology ==
Epeds Electric Scooters utilise the foremost technology in economical power with Crystal batteries as opposed to the typical lead acid batteries. Essentially using salt water electrolysis to hold their charge, they are completely non-hazardous in use and disposal. This form of battery can be charged off a minimum 5amp draw which equates to less than a car stereo.
