= Honda XBR500 =

Japanese sports motorcycle

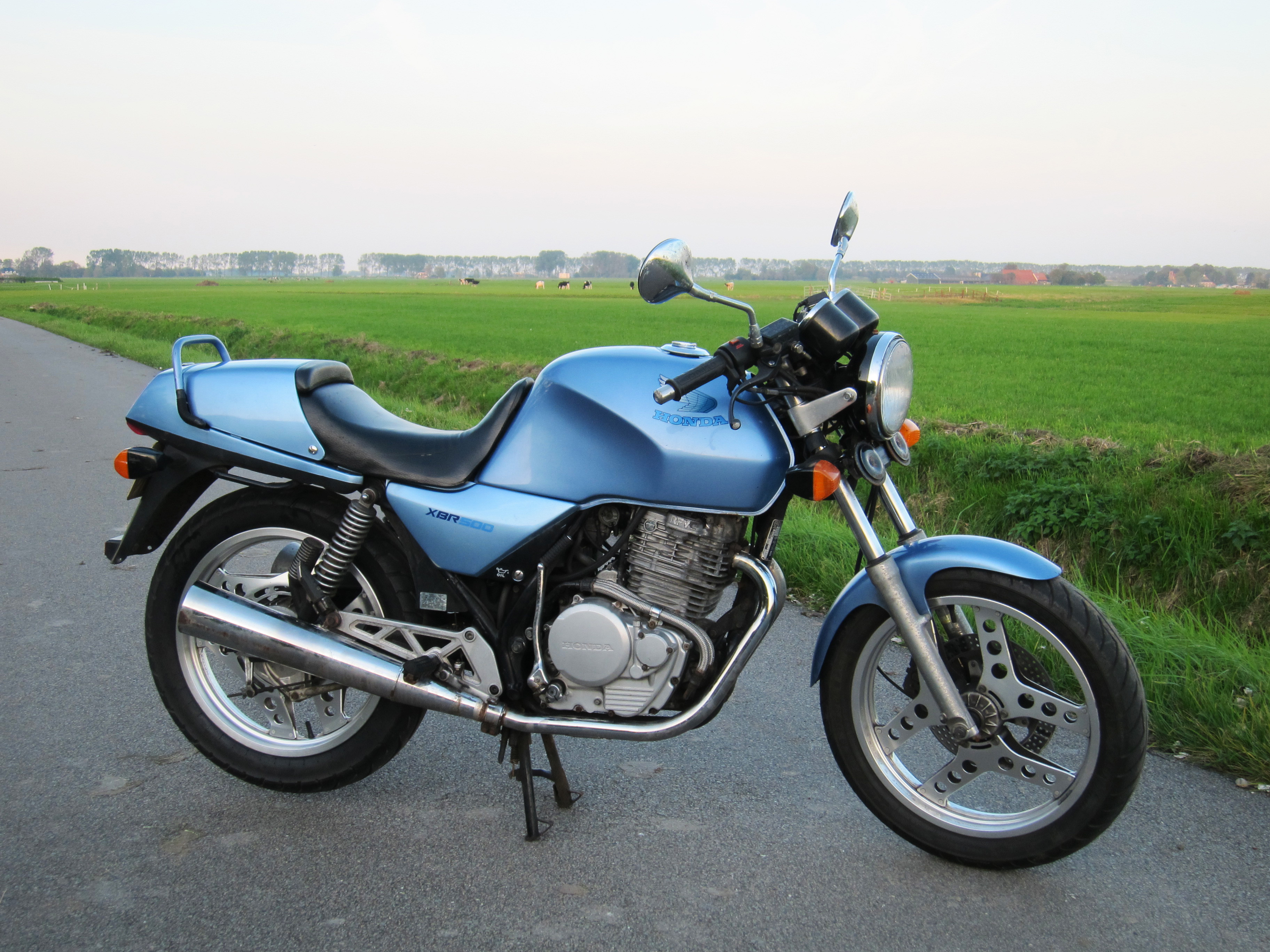
Honda XBR 500 (1985) with Comstar wheels

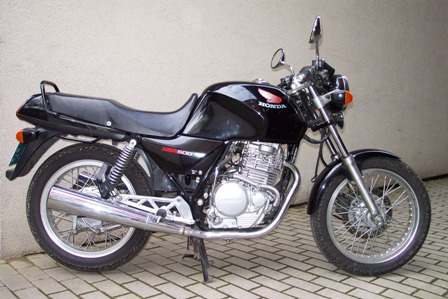
Honda XBR 500 (1988) with wire-spoked wheels

The Honda XBR 500 is a 500cc Japanese sports motorcycle launched by Honda in 1985 and in response to the Yamaha SR500. It is powered by a single-cylinder four-valve engine with the valve stem axes arranged radially relative to the geometric centre of the hemispherical combustion chamber - (Honda's Radial Four Valve Combustion Chamber, or RFVC) and actuated by rockers and intermediate sub-rockers. Displacing 498 cc (30.4 cu in) and producing 27 or 44 hp (depending upon specific market legislation), the engine, having its origins in the Honda XR series off-road models, features a "quasi-dry sump", the bulk of the oil being stored in a separate tank below the seat but a proportion (ca. 0,5 litres) of the lubricant remaining in the crankcase sump. The steel-braided hoses connecting the oil tank to the engine (clearly visible at the right-hand side of the motorcycle) are a strong visual element.

The two exhaust valves enabled the motorcycle to be fitted with two separate exhaust systems. The motorcycle had both an electric start and a kick start. On earlier models, the kick start was linked by a cable to an exhaust valve lifter to reduce cylinder compression during manual engine starting; later examples incorporated an automatic valve lifter as part of the camshaft assembly. This also assisted in reducing the starter motor cranking loads. The fuel-efficient engine combined with the large fuel tank capacity (20 litres/5,28 US galls) provided the bike with a long range (typically well in excess of 200 miles/322 km) between refueling.

XBR500s (F, G and some H sub-types) were fitted with 18" Comstar wheels and tubeless tyres, 100/90 front and 110/90 rear. The frame was of a single-downtube, dual-cradle design having a box-section swinging arm and conventionally sprung rear suspension. The last iterations - some XBR500H and all XBR500J types - were supplied with traditional wire wheels and tubed tyres. The narrow, 150 kg (dry) XBR500 with a wheelbase of 1,400 mm (55 in) is a fine-handling machine with a sprightly performance. A detachable pillion seat cover was supplied to simulate a café-racer look, but Honda subsequently released a dedicated café racer version of near-identical mechanical specification although of lesser power - the Honda GB500 TT - which featured some "classic British qualities", such as a solo seat, seat hump, wire wheels, two-into-one exhaust system and a fuel-tank with gold pinstriping reminiscent of the earlier AJS and Velocette machines thought to inspire its styling.
