= Suzuki Boulevard S40 =

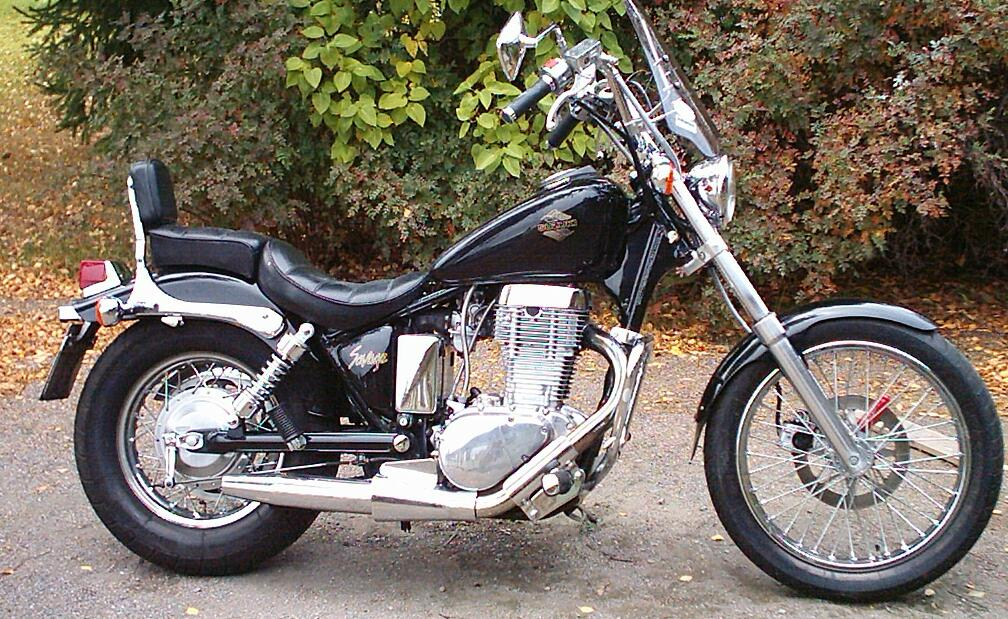
- 1988 Suzuki LS650 Savage
- Manufacturer: Suzuki Motor Corporation
- Also called: Suzuki LS650 Savage
- Production: 1986—2020
- Assembly: Toyokawa, Aichi, Japan
- Class: Cruiser
- Engine: 652 cc (39.8 cu in) 4‑stroke, SOHC, 4‑valve single cylinder, air‑cooled, Mikuni BS40 CV carburetor
- Bore / stroke: 94.0 mm × 94.0 mm (3.70 in × 3.70 in)
- Compression ratio: 8.5:1
- Power: 31 hp (23 kW) @ 5400 rpm
- Torque: 50 N⋅m (37 lbf⋅ft) @ 3400 rpm
- Ignition type: Electronic (transistorized)
- Transmission: Manual 5-speed constant mesh, belt drive
- Frame type: Half-duplex cradle
- Suspension: F: Telescopic, coil spring, oil damped, 140 mm (5.5 in) stroke R: Swingarm type, coil spring, oil damped 80 mm (3.1 in) travel
- Brakes: F: Disc; R: Drum
- Tires: F: 100/90-19M/C 57H, tube type R: 140/80-15M/C 67H, tube type
- Rake, trail: 35 deg / 147 mm (5.8 in)
- Wheelbase: 1,480 mm (58 in)
- Dimensions: L: 2,180 mm (86 in); W: 720 mm (28 in); H: 1,105 mm (43.5 in)
- Seat height: 700 mm (28 in)
- Weight: 173 kg (381 lb) (wet)
- Fuel capacity: 10.5 L (2.3 imp gal; 2.8 US gal) (including 2.5 L of reserve)
- Oil capacity: 2.0 L (2.1 US qt) with filter change
- Fuel consumption: 50 mpg_{‑US} (4.7 L/100 km; 60 mpg_{‑imp})
- Turning radius: 2.6 m (8 ft 6 in)

The Suzuki Boulevard S40 (formerly Suzuki LS650 Savage) is a lightweight cruiser motorcycle manufactured by the Suzuki Motor Corporation for the Japanese domestic market, and exported to New Zealand, North America, as well as to Chile and other countries.

== History ==
Manufactured and marketed as the Savage from 1986 to 2004, the motorcycle was renamed in 2005 as the Boulevard S40. The LS650 has remained unchanged except for minor cosmetic changes, receiving a 5 rather than 4 speed transmission in 1993. With a weight of 381 lb (173 kg), Suzuki markets the S40 as "an entry-level model to the cruiser line." With a seat height of 28 inches and flatter handlebar, the bike is suitable for shorter riders.

== Competition ==
The LS650 Savage was the first cruiser manufactured by Suzuki in 1986. The Kawasaki Vulcan 400 entry-level cruiser with a V-twin engine was introduced the same year as the Suzuki Savage, and the Vulcan 500 LTD with a parallel-twin engine was introduced in 1990. One of the few small cruiser motorcycles available with a shaft drive as an alternative to either chain or belt final drive, the Yamaha Virago 535 was introduced in 1987. Honda launched the Shadow VLX, with a 583 cc V-twin, in the 1988 model year to compete with the single-cylinder Savage. The Savage's persona was a bike that stayed out of harm's way, with a torquey engine (although underpowered for its displacement) that made few demands on the rider.

Compared to the discontinued Buell Blast, which had a 30 c.i.d. single-cylinder engine with somewhat heavier vibration, the S40 is a more versatile and less expensive entry-level motorcycle.

The Boulevard S40 fills the gap between less powerful 250 cc entry-level cruisers and more powerful twin-cylinder 500-650 cc cruisers. The S40's smaller competitors are the Yamaha V-Star 250 and the Honda Rebel 250. Although some consider the S40 too powerful for a novice motorcyclist, its light weight and low seat height make it ideal for beginners who feel that 250 cc bikes are too small. The S40 has larger shaft-driven rivals in the Yamaha V-Star 650 Custom and the Honda Shadow Spirit 750, which boasts its "super-low" 25.7-inch seat height. Similarly, the Sportster XL883L "Low" and later "SuperLow" are Harley-Davidson's starter bikes.

Two enduring competitors are motorcycles with air-cooled single-cylinder engines that have been produced even longer than Suzuki's S40: Royal Enfield's Bullet and Yamaha's SR400. The latter was reintroduced to markets outside of Japan in 2014.

== Performance ==
The Boulevard 40's engine is a 40 c.i.d. (652 cc), four-stroke, air-cooled, single overhead camshaft power plant, incorporating a Twin-Swirl Combustion Chamber (TSCC) cylinder head design first used in the Suzuki GSX series motorcycle engines. This engine features a balance shaft and an output of 31 horsepower. At 60 mph the engine is spinning at a moderate 3940RPM.

In 1996, Motorcycle Consumer News measured 31 horsepower at the rear wheel of an LS650 Savage, and a rear-wheel torque of 30.5 pound-foot. The LS650 registered a quarter mile time of 15.3 seconds at a speed of 81.1 mph and an average fuel mileage of 55 mpg. In a 2006 road test, Motorcycle Cruiser magazine recorded a quarter mile time of 16.35 sec at 77.2 mph. Average fuel mileage for the S40 was 52.9 mpg.

The S40's "thumper" engine (single-cylinder, four-stroke), is among the largest displacement single cylinder motorcycle engines in production as of 2018, alongside the Suzuki DR650SE and KTM 690 Duke.

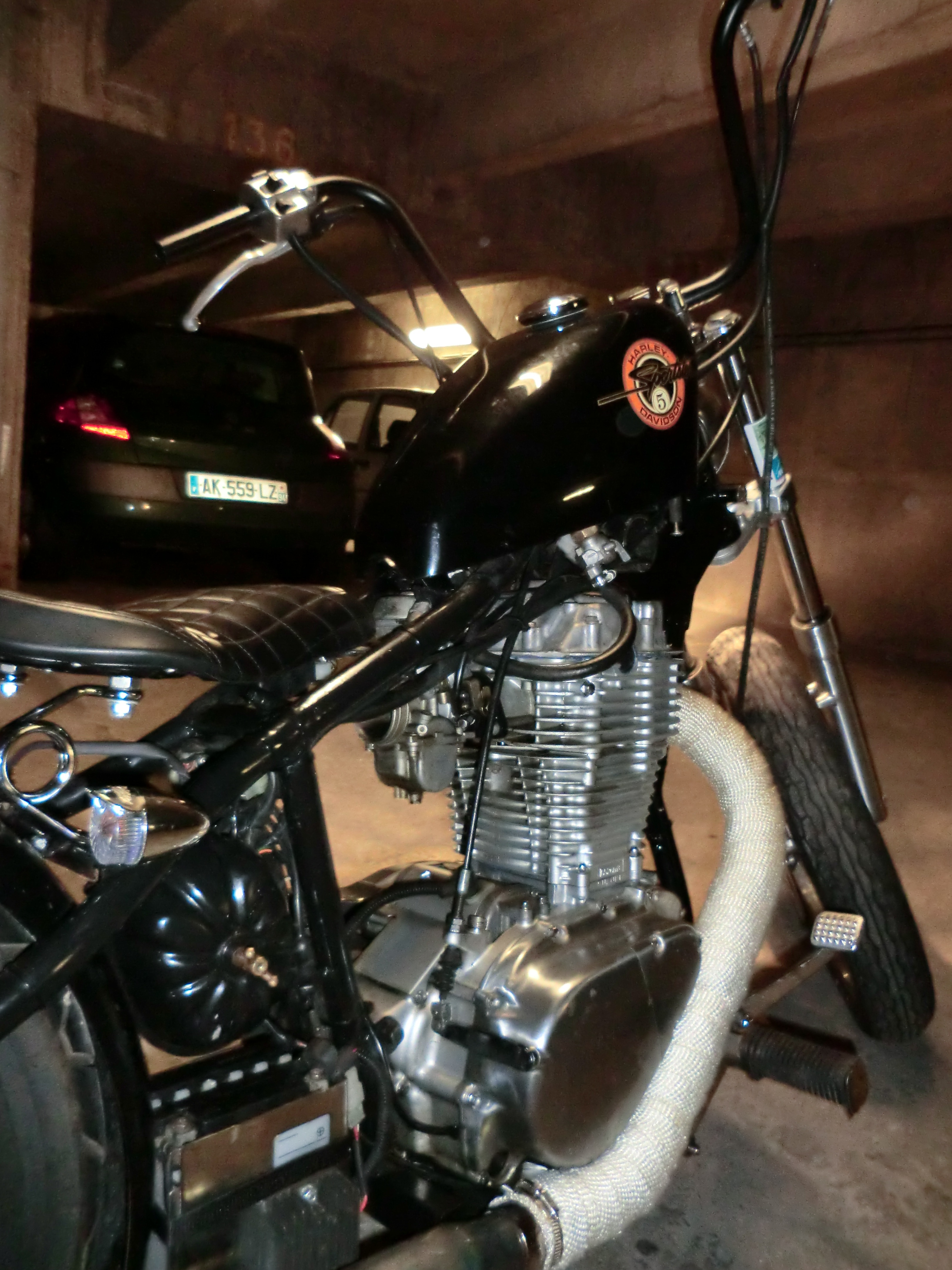
custom

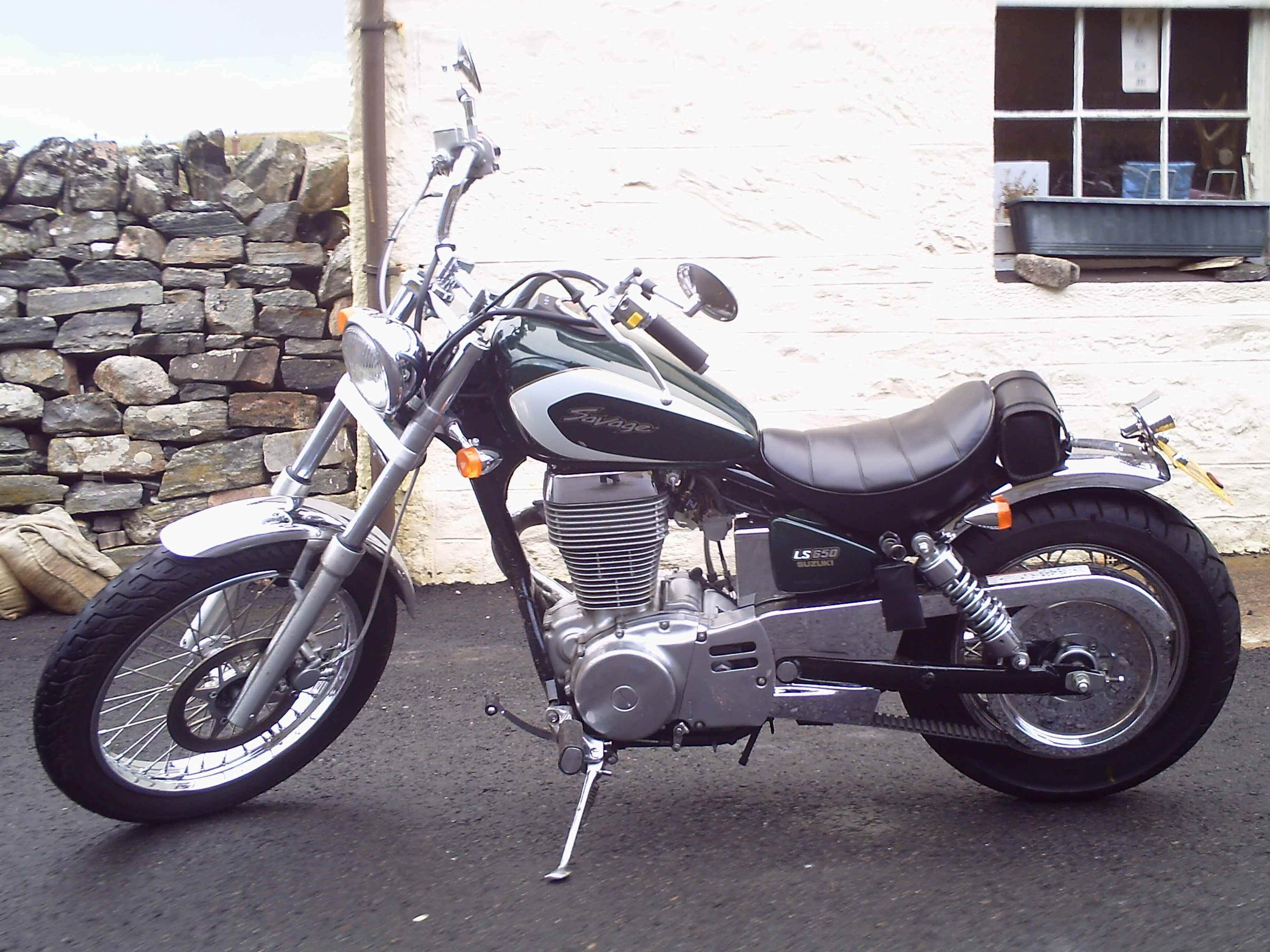
2000 Suzuki LS650 Savage

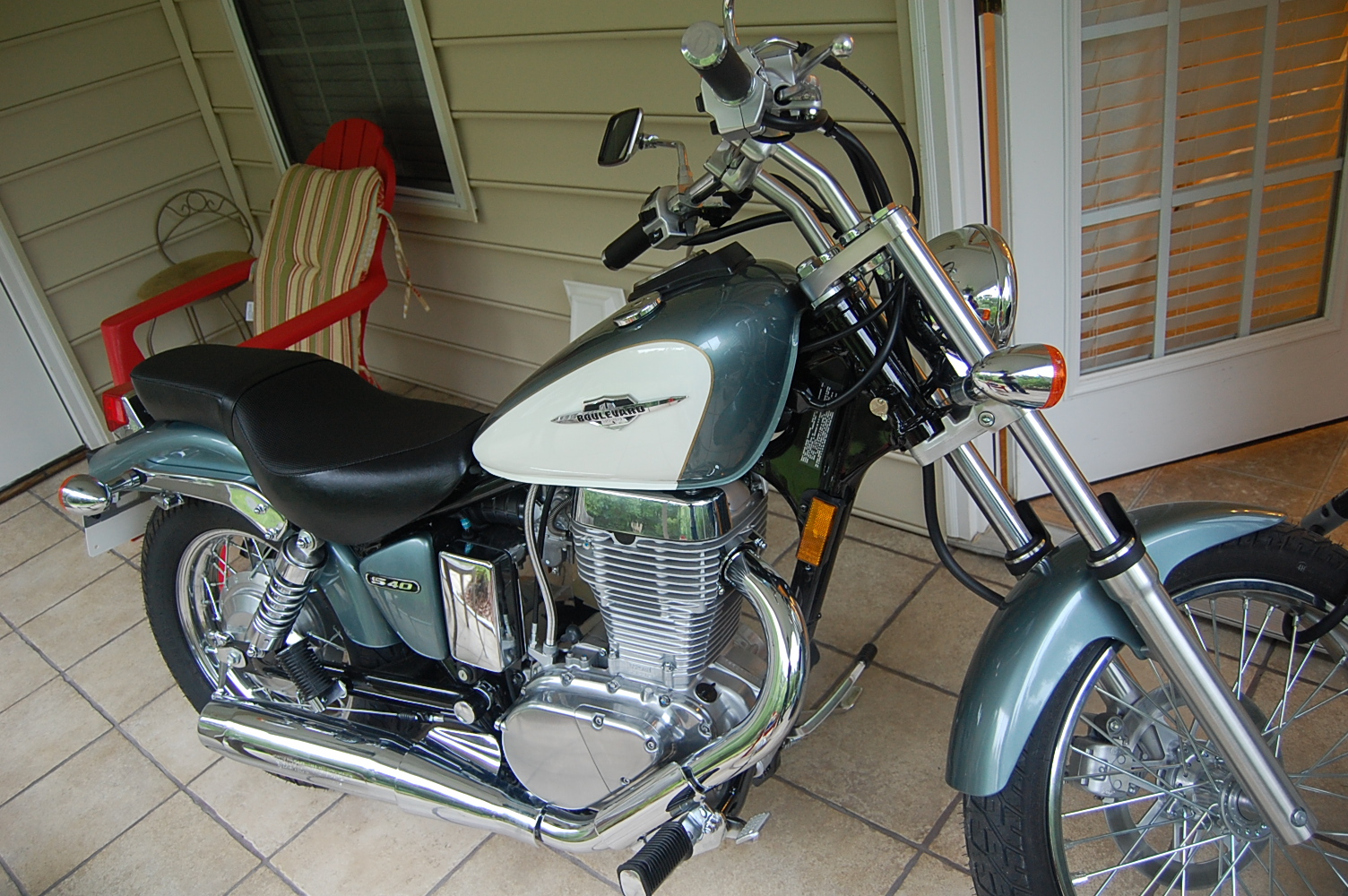
2011 Suzuki Boulevard S40
