= Husqvarna Nuda 900 =

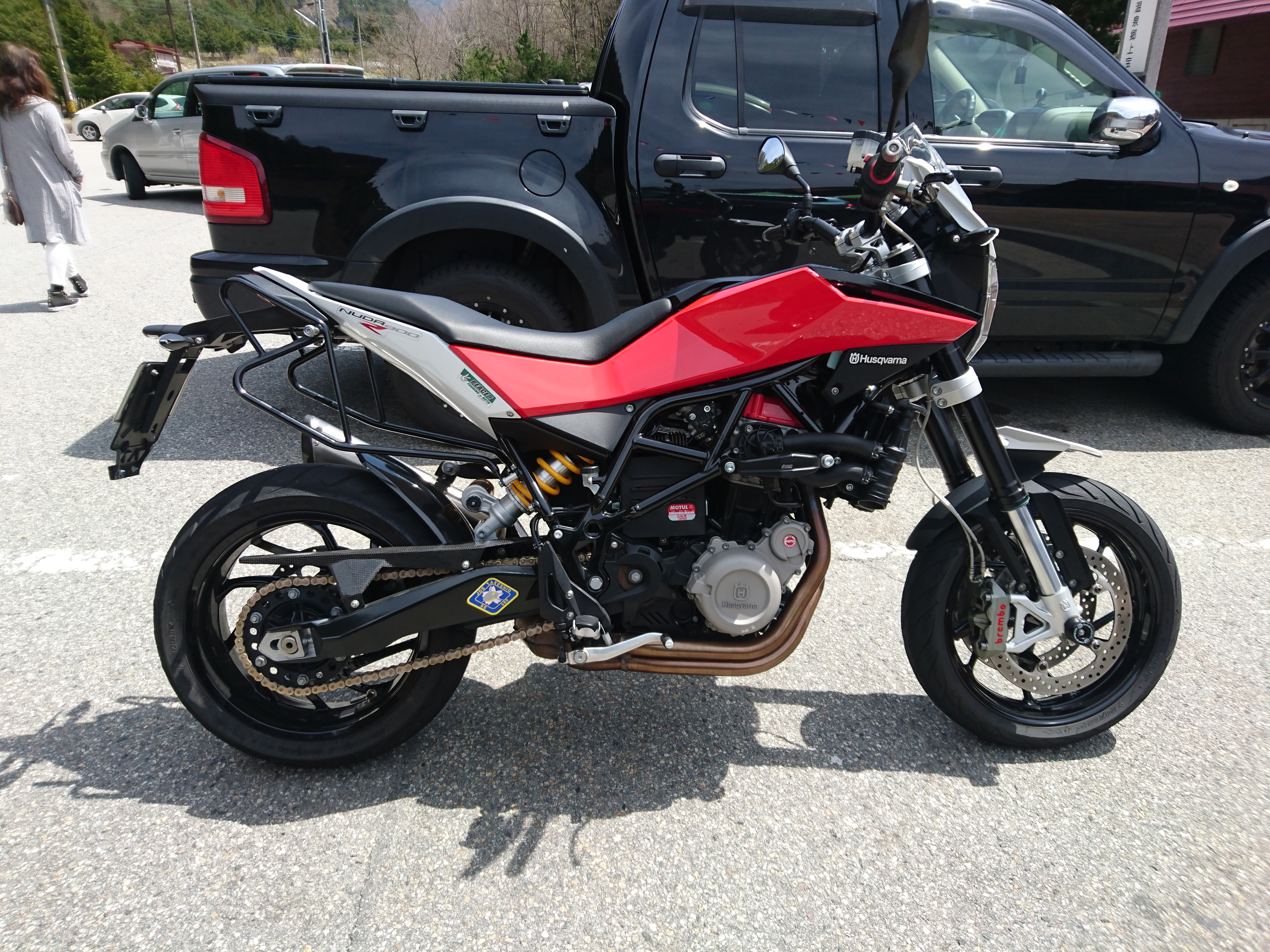
- Manufacturer: Husqvarna Motorcycles
- Production: 2012-2013
- Class: Naked

The Husqvarna Nuda 900 is a naked bike produced by Husqvarna Motorcycles, which was built in Varese, Italy, from 2012 to 2013.

== History ==
The Nuda 900 was developed in close collaboration with BMW Motorrad, following the acquisition of Husqvarna by BMW AG in 2007. It is powered by a modified inline twin-cylinder engine from the BMW F 800 series, installed in a similarly modified steel tubular frame from the BMW F 800 GS. Starting in 2013, the Nuda 900 was also available with Bosch ABS. Production was discontinued in 2013 after Husqvarna was sold to KTM, and the remaining stocks were sold off. The reason was the close technical similarity to the BMW F 800 series.

The Nuda has a very large fan base. The Nuda meeting takes place annually around Corpus Christi in the Bavarian Forest. Fans from all over Europe come to the area near St. Englmar.

== Variants ==
Two variants were offered: the Nuda 900 and the Nuda 900 R. The latter featured a higher-quality front brake, fully adjustable suspension, a different seat, carbon fiber applications on the rear muffler, and red instead of black side panels. The 900 R also has a shorter gear ratio, which improves acceleration and responsiveness, but reduces the top speed by approximately 8 km/h (217 km/h instead of 225 km/h).

== Specifications ==
The engine of the Nuda 900 is derived from the BMW F 800 series, but has a displacement of 898 cc thanks to a 2 mm larger bore (84 mm) and a 5.6 mm longer stroke (81 mm). It also features a 45° crankpin offset and thus a firing offset of 315°/405°, which corresponds to that of a V-twin engine with a 45° cylinder angle. The two-cylinder engine produces 77 kW (105 hp) and a maximum torque of 98 Nm.
