= Piaggio MP3 =

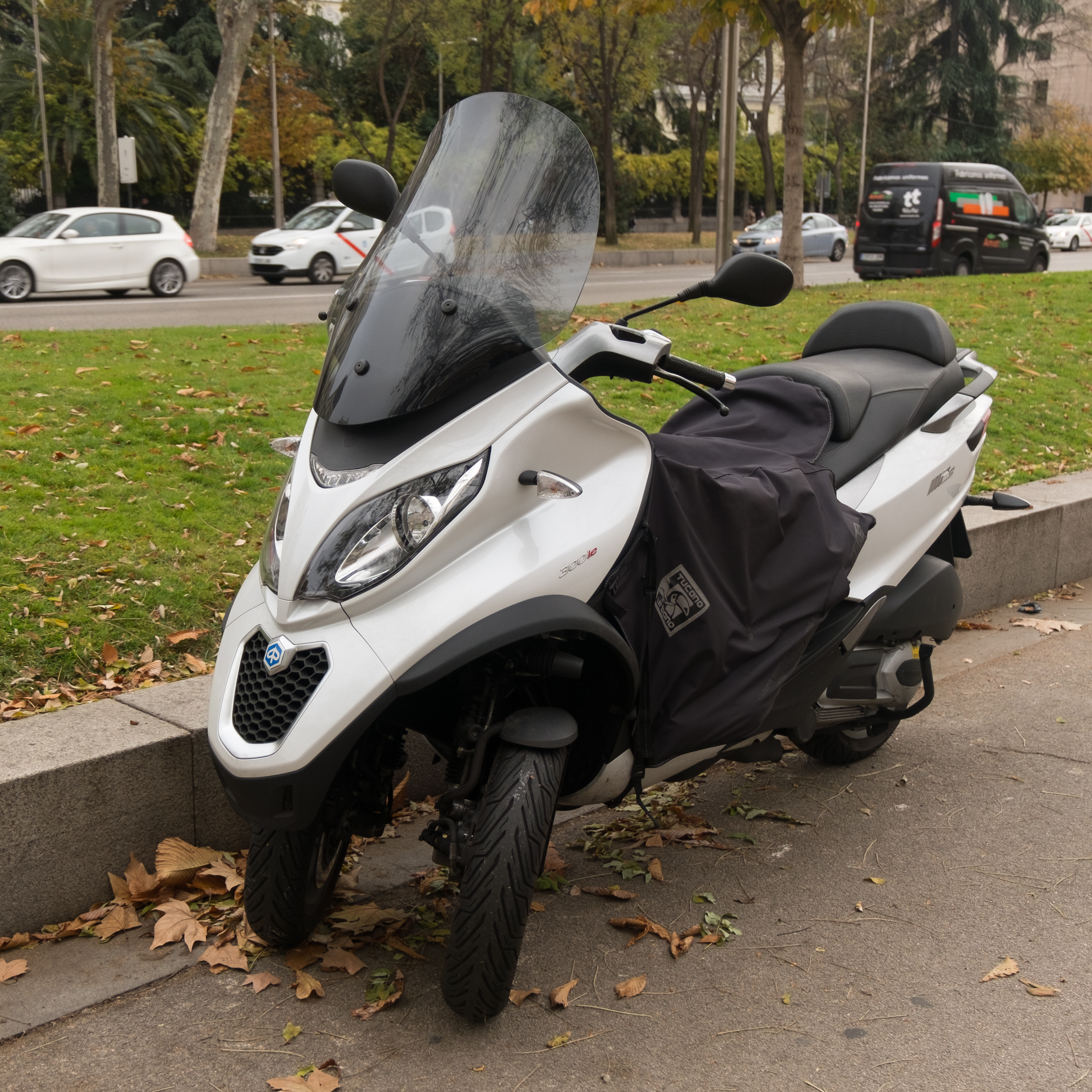
- Manufacturer: Piaggio
- Also called: Gilera Fuoco
- Production: 2006–present
- Assembly: Pontedera, Italy
- Class: Three-wheeled scooter
- Engine: Petrol: 124 cm^{3} Leader 125 four-stroke; 244 cm^{3} Quasar 250 four-stroke; 278 cm^{3} Quasar 300 four-stroke; 330 cm^{3} HPE 350 four-stroke; 399 cm^{3} Master 400 four-stroke; 493 cm^{3} Master 500 four-stroke; 530 cm^{3} HPE 530 four-stroke; Petrol plug-in hybrid: 124 cm^{3} Leader 125 four-stroke; 278 cm^{3} Quasar 300 four-stroke
- Transmission: V-Belt Automatic (CVT)
- Suspension: Front: Telescopic fork, Rear: Unit swing
- Brakes: Front: single discs(x2), Rear: single disc
- Weight: 152 kg (335 lb)-249 kg (549 lb) (wet)

The Piaggio MP3 (Moto Piaggio a 3 ruote, "Piaggio moto with 3 wheels") is a tilting three-wheeled scooter by Italian manufacturer Piaggio. First marketed in 2006, it is noted for its combination of two front wheels and a single rear wheel.

== Suspension mechanism ==
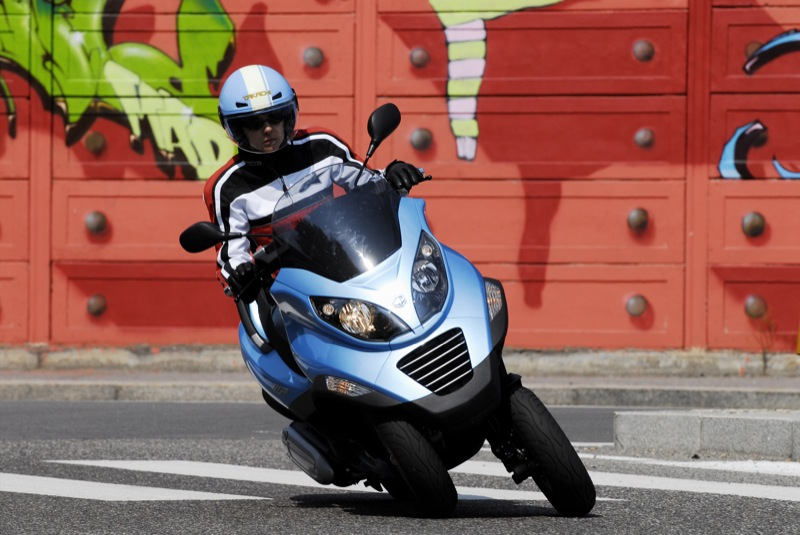
2007 Piaggio MP3

Utilising a three-wheel mechanism developed by Piaggio and Marabese Design, the MP3 can be stopped and parked without using a traditional kickstand or centre stand, and can be parked on irregular or side-sloping ground.

The front suspension is similar to the single-sided trailing arm of Vespa-style suspensions, linked by an aluminium alloy parallelogram and a central steering arm. When moving at slow speeds or stopped, the rider maintains balance by maintaining forward motion or placing feet on the ground. The front suspension locks or unlocks using a switch, which is located just below the throttle on the right handlebar. The suspension lock can only be activated manually, at low speeds or at a stop; the lock is automatically disengaged when the engine speed exceeds 2,500 rpm. A parking brake is used in conjunction with the locking mechanism to park the bike. A traditional center stand is also provided, useful in situations where the suspension cannot be locked, such as with a dead battery (though the suspension will remain locked if the battery fails or is removed while the scooter is parked).

== History ==
=== First generation ===
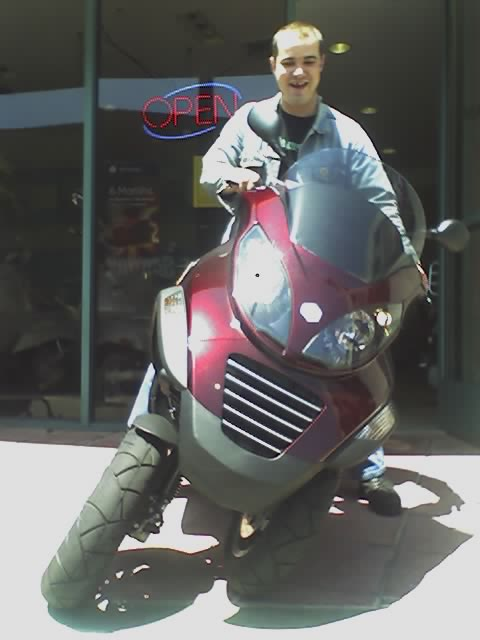
Example of the MP3 parallelogram suspension

The MP3 was launched on the market in May 2006 in two versions of displacement, using the four-stroke engines already present on other models of the house, the Leader 125 cm^{3} and the Quasar 250 cm^{3}, both with liquid cooling. Euro 3 homologated, these two engines respectively deliver 15 hp at 9,250 rpm the 125, 22.5 hp at 8,250 rpm the 250.

In November 2006 the Master 400 cm^{3} version was officially presented capable of 34 HP and on sale since summer 2007.

In Europe, the 500 cm^{3} version is marketed under the sporty Gilera brand, called the Gilera Fuoco 500ie. In the United States, the 125 cc is not available, and the Fuoco is marketed as the Piaggio MP3 500.

In June 2009, the MP3 LT 400 was launched in the UK. This version has a slightly wider front track allowing it to be classified as a tricycle rather than as a motorcycle (as are the other versions). This allows the LT400 variant to be driven on a standard UK car licence rather than the motorcycle licence required for the original versions. Other changes were indicators on stalks higher up and a footbrake added to qualify as a trike.

In February 2011 the more compact MP3 Yourban was introduced in the market.

=== Second generation ===
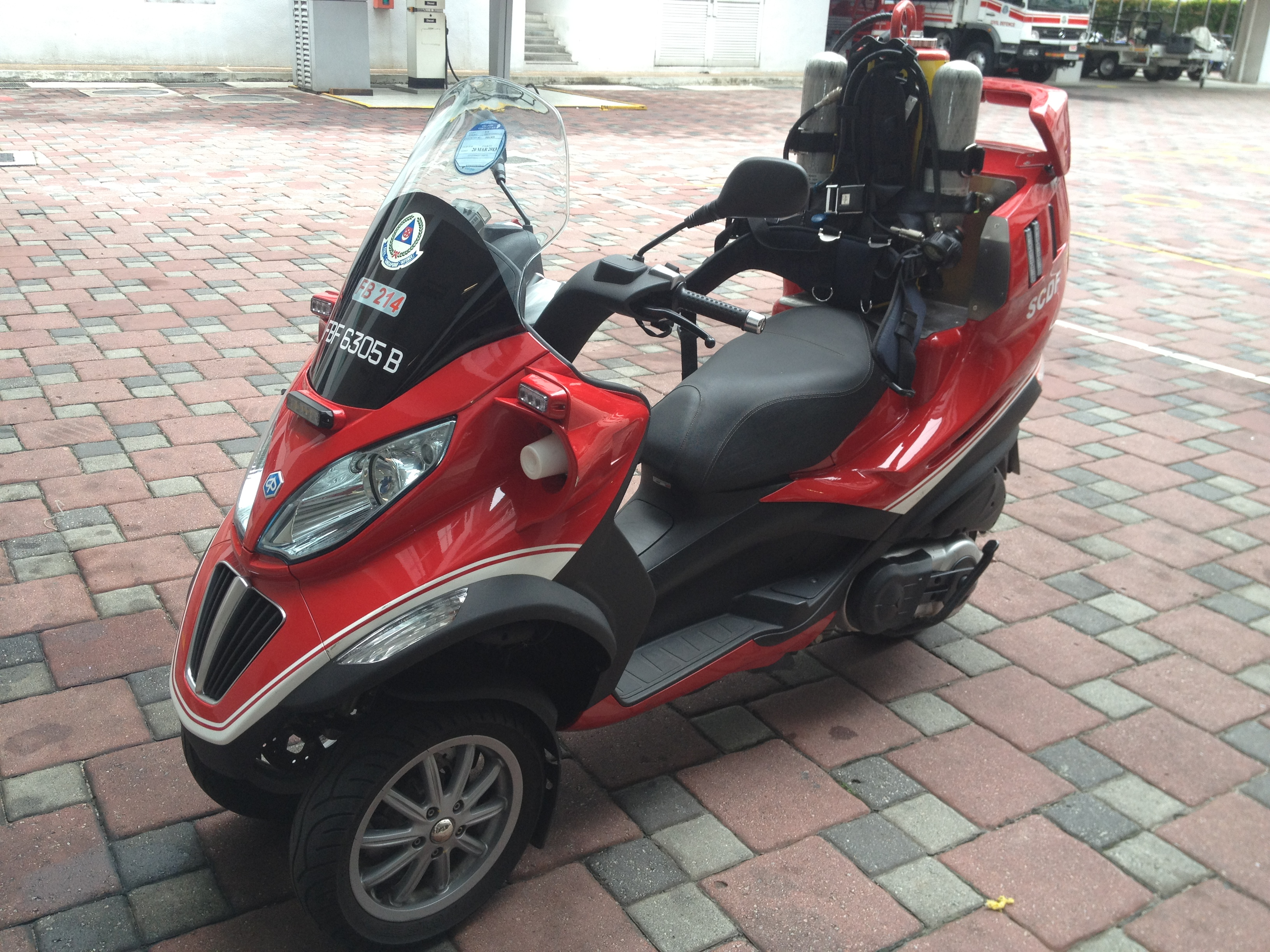
Singapore Civil Defence Force Piaggio MP3 Firebike (Red Scorpions)

On 16 May 2014 Roberto Colannino (president of the Piaggio Group) presents the totally new second generation of MP3 which brings to the debut the new 500 LT model with ABS anti-lock system and ASR (Acceleration Slip Regulation) traction control as standard. The frame is new and new 13” front wheels are introduced. A few months after the debut of the 500, the 300 model was also introduced in July 2014. All models can be driven with a car license (B license in Italy). Yourban and Hybrid models remain in the price list.

In July 2017 all engines are Euro 4 homologated.

At EICMA 2017 Piaggio presents the 2018 range which brings a slight front restyling to its debut with the introduction of a new full LED headlight and new engine range consisting of 350 HPE and 500 HPE engines. The engine range is completed at the end of 2018 with the introduction of the basic model powered by the new 300 HPE which joins the 350 and definitively replaces the old Yourban range which will be discontinued at the beginning of 2019.

In 2019, reverse gear was added to the 500 Sport Advanced version.

In May 2021, the new 400 HPE engine that replaces the 350 debuts. This unit delivers 35.4 HP of power and 37.7 Nm of maximum torque and is Euro 5 homologated.

=== Third generation ===
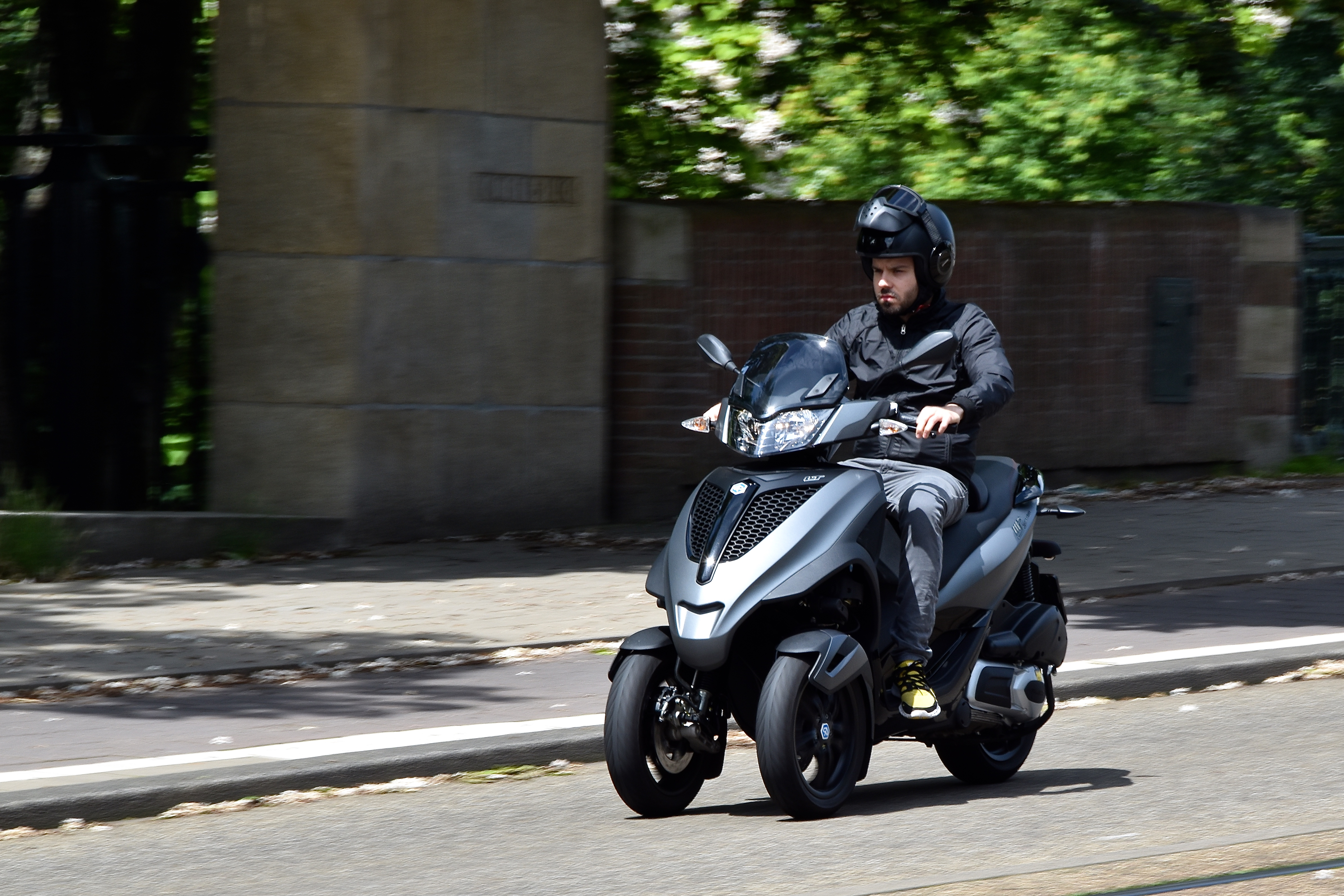
A Piaggio MP3 Yourban model

In June 2022, after 16 years and 230,000 units sold, the third generation of MP3 was presented, available in two 400 HPE 35.3 horsepower and 530 HPE 44.2 horsepower engines. In addition to the renewed design, the ARAS driving assistance system is introduced for version 530 with the Blind Spot Information System (Blis) and Lane Change Decision Aid System (Lcdas) functions as well as a rear view camera. Standard on all models ABS and ASR.

The family also includes the MP3 310, offered in standard and Sport trim, the most compact of the range. The Sport 310 is powered by a 310 cm³ single-cylinder HPE engine delivering 19.4 kW (26.4 horsepower) at 7,500 rpm and 27.3 Nm of maximum torque at 6,000 rpm, and weighs 230 kg in running order with a length of 2,035 mm. The Exclusive 530 delivers 50.1 Nm of maximum torque at 5,250 rpm. Both are homologated to Euro 5+.

== Variants ==
=== MP3 Hybrid (2009-2017) ===
In September 2009, a plug-in hybrid version of the MP3 was launched, following trials in 2008 by the New York City Police Department. It has a 125 cm^{3} Leader engine and a battery-driven 2.6 kW (3.5 hp) electric motor, with a regenerative braking system. The vehicle has three user-selected variants of hybrid drive to create a vehicle capable of up to 141 mpg_{‑US} (1.67 L/100 km; 169 mpg_{‑imp}) and 0–60 mph (0–97 km/h) in about 5 seconds when both methods of propulsion are used. In electric-only mode the MP3 can travel a distance of 11 miles (18 km) at a maximum speed of 20 mph (32 km/h). When both power sources are used the MP3 can run for a maximum of 25 minutes, with performance equivalent to a 250 cc scooter. When powered solely by the petrol engine the MP3 is slower than other 125 cm^{3} machines due to its weight: 249 kg (549 lb) compared with 208 kg (459 lb) for the petrol-only model.

In June 2010 Piaggio launched the 300 plug-in Hybrid variant with the 278 cm^{3} Quasar Euro 3 engine.

All MP3 Hybrid versions were discontinued in 2017.
