= Suzuki Boulevard M50 =

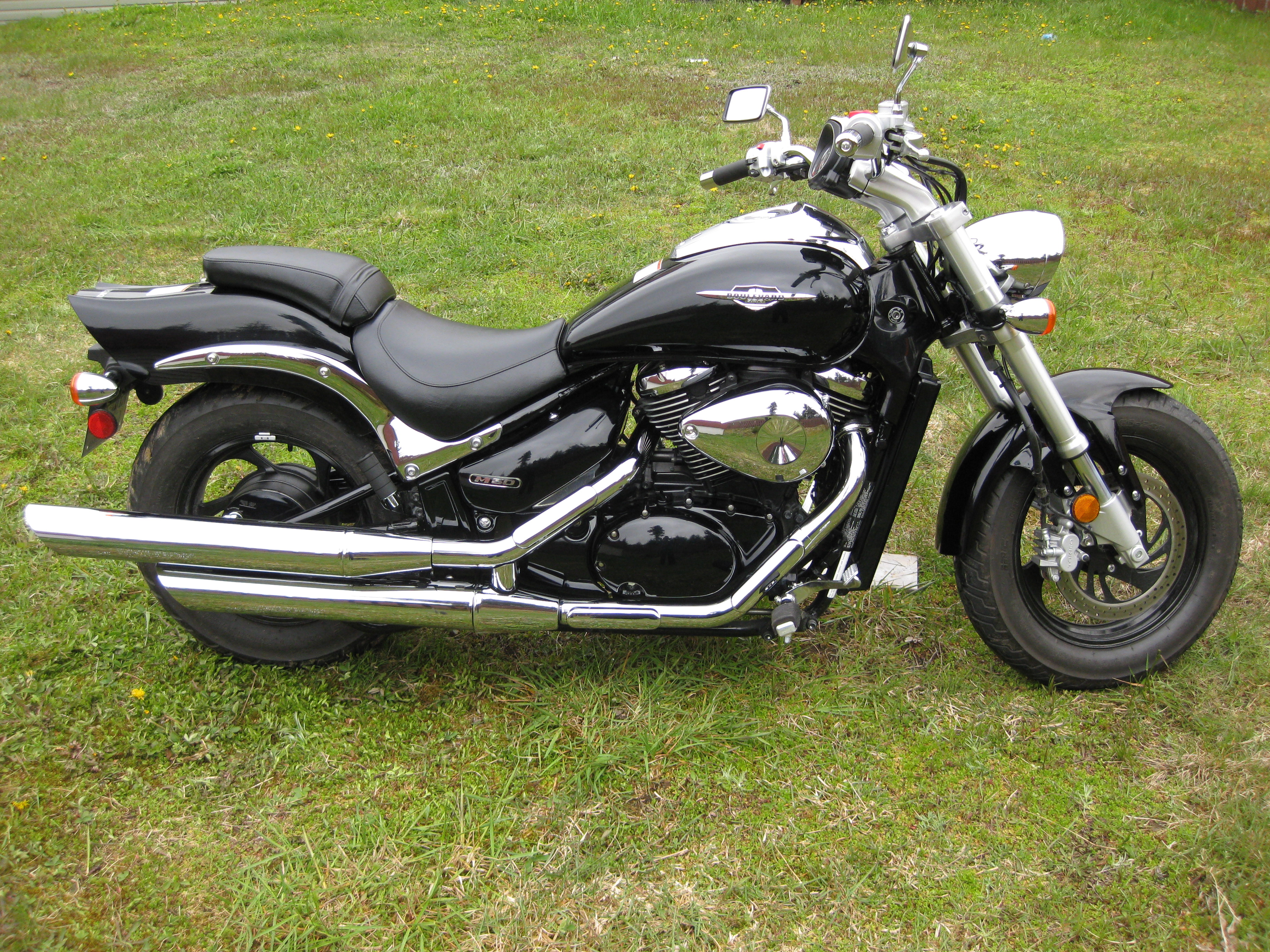
- Manufacturer: Suzuki
- Also called: Intruder M800
- Production: Since 2005
- Predecessor: VZ800 Marauder
- Class: Cruiser
- Engine: 805 cc (49.1 cu in) 45° V-twin engine
- Bore / stroke: 83 mm × 74.4 mm (3.27 in × 2.93 in)
- Compression ratio: 9.4:1
- Ignition type: Electronic
- Transmission: 5-speed manual
- Frame type: Steel
- Suspension: Front: Inverted, telescopic, coil spring, oil damped Rear: Link-type, oil damped
- Brakes: Front: Single 300mm disc 2 piston caliper Rear: drum
- Tires: Front: 130/90-16M/C 67H, tubeless Rear: 170/80-15M/C 77H, tubeless
- Wheelbase: 1,655 mm (65.2 in)
- Dimensions: L: 2,395 mm (94.3 in); W: 890 mm (35 in)
- Seat height: 700 mm (28 in)
- Weight: 540 lb (240 kg) (dry)
- Fuel capacity: 15.5 L (3.4 imp gal; 4.1 US gal)

The Boulevard M50, or Intruder M800 outside North America, is a V-twin engine cruiser motorcycle made by Suzuki Motor Corporation. Global model number is VZ800 (from 2005, before 2005 VZ800 was the model number for the Marauder 800 which was a significantly different model). It is based on the popular VL800 C50 with C standing for 'classic'. The VL800 C50 was originally named the VL800 Intruder Volusia, but the name was later shortened to Volusia. Its styling is from the first generation VZ800 Marauder. In 2005 the marketing name was again changed when Suzuki replaced the carburetors with fuel injection, with M standing for 'muscle' and 50 representing the displacement of the engine in cubic inches. Intruder M800 refers to the 800 cubic centimetre engine following the naming convention for Suzuki cruisers in markets outside North America.

The M50 was developed using the C50 frame and rear swingarm, which is a softail type with a hidden single shock absorber, compared to the Marauder's traditional swingarm with two exposed shock absorbers. The M50 received different fenders and fuel tank from the C50, a handlebar mounted speedometer cluster, and inverted 41mm forks, to give it a more muscular appearance than the C50 semi-sister. The basic M50 engine was slightly modified, being painted black instead of the chrome found on the C50 engine. Internally, the engine received split crank bearings instead of the C50's one-piece bearings, as well as slightly modified valvetrain components, which necessitated modifications to the cylinder heads. Power output is identical to the C50 power plant, and both displace 805 cc. Both models share a 5 speed transmission inside a shared crankcase with the engine with wet clutch, water cooling, a single front disc brake, and a rod operated rear drum brake.

The M50 featured distinctive styling, with a unique rear fender, LED taillight, black painted mag wheels, and aggressive stance. Several other minor differences differentiate the M50 from the C50, such as different design (but same size) front brake discs, a slightly firmer suspension on the M50, and a different tool box/ faux air cleaner. The model was well received in the motorcycle press, with Motorcycle Cruiser Magazine giving it high marks for comfort and passenger carrying capacity. However, some critics lamented that the M50 did not have the power to back up its muscular looks. The model was not a top seller, and after five model-years Suzuki did a complete makeover of the model.

For 2010, the M50 was given a major redesign. The M50 motor was discontinued, and the current model M50 now uses the same motor as the C50, consolidating production and simplifying parts sourcing. The sheet metal was changed, eliminating the distinctive rear fender found on the 2005–09 M50 in favor of a fender similar to the one found on other cruiser models. A small cowling was added around the headlight, giving the M50 a family resemblance to the other Suzuki M series cruisers, the M90 and M109r. Sales numbers for the redesigned M50 are unavailable, as Suzuki chose not to ship any 2010 models to North America due to the large supply of leftover 2009s in dealer inventory.

== See also ==
- List of Suzuki motorcycles
