= Suzuki DL/V-Strom series =

The Suzuki V-Strom Series is a series of dual-sport motorcycles made by Suzuki:

- Suzuki V-Strom 250
- Suzuki V-Strom 650
- Suzuki V-Strom 800
- Suzuki V-Strom 1000
- Suzuki V-Strom 1050
