= V-Strom =

V-Strom may refer to:

- Suzuki V-Strom 250, motorcycle
- Suzuki V-Strom 650, motorcycle
- Suzuki V-Strom 800, motorcycle produced by 2022
- Suzuki V-Strom 1000, motorcycle
- Suzuki V-Strom 1050, motorcycle
