= Suzuki SV1000 =

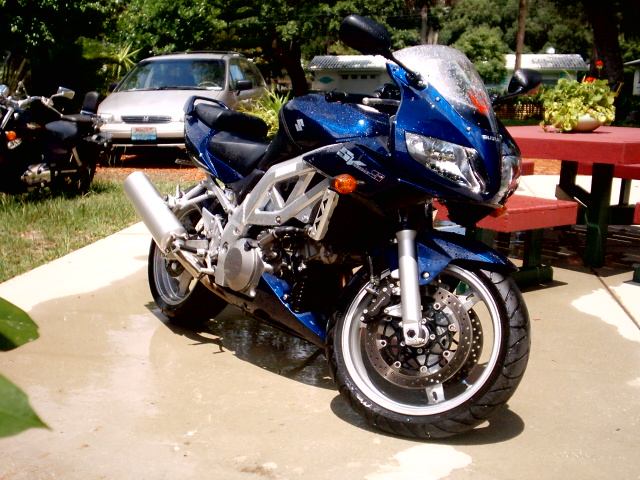
- 2004 Suzuki SV1000S
- Manufacturer: Suzuki Motor Corporation
- Production: 2003–2007
- Predecessor: TL1000S
- Class: Naked bike Sportbike
- Engine: 996 cc (60.8 cu in) 90° V-twin 8-valve DOHC
- Bore / stroke: 98.0 mm × 66.0 mm (3.86 in × 2.60 in)
- Compression ratio: 11.6:1
- Top speed: 237 km/h (147 mph)
- Power: 81 kW (108 hp) (rear wheel); 89 kW (120 hp) @ 9,000 rpm (claimed)
- Torque: 94 N⋅m (69 lb⋅ft) (rear wheel); 102 N⋅m (75 lb⋅ft) @ 7,200 rpm (claimed)
- Transmission: 6 speed
- Suspension: Front 46 mm telescopic fork fully adjustable / 4.72 in travel Rear progressive Link-type, monoshock fully adjustable / 5.12 in travel
- Brakes: Front Dual 310 mm (12 in) discs with dual 4-piston tokico calipers Rear Single 220 mm (8.7 in) disc with 1-piston caliper
- Tyres: Front: 120/70ZR17; Rear: 180/55ZR17
- Rake, trail: 25°, 3.94 in (100 mm)
- Wheelbase: 1,430 mm (56.3 in)
- Dimensions: L: 2,085 mm (82.1 in); W: 745 mm (29.3 in); H: 1,170 mm (46 in)
- Seat height: 800 mm (31 in)
- Weight: 186 kg (410 lb) (dry); 207–218 kg (456–480 lb) (wet)
- Fuel capacity: 17 L (3.7 imp gal; 4.5 US gal)
- Related: Suzuki SV650

The Suzuki SV1000 and the half-faired SV1000S are naked bike motorcycles made by Suzuki since 2003.

== Overview ==
The 996 cc (60.8 cu in) displacement 90° V-twin motorcycles were aimed to compete directly with the Honda VTR1000F (also known as the SuperHawk or FireStorm, depending on the market), which was released prior to the Suzuki, and the low end Ducati one-litre V-twin engined sport bikes. The SV1000 is the larger version of the popular 650 cc SV650 motorcycle. The SV1000 shares many common parts with the SV650, including all bodywork (front fairing, fuel tank and rear plastics/subframe), but the main frame, handlebars, swingarm and forks are different. The front forks and brakes are sourced from the earlier GSX-R600. The SV1000's engine is sourced from the TL1000S which, inside were over 300 changes to improve low-end and midrange performance.

Unlike the Firestorm/SuperHawk, which had large 48 mm carburettors, the 2003 and later SV1000 was fuel injected and had Suzuki's 'Dual-Throttle Valve' technology. In 2004, the ergonomics were revised, with lower pegs and a slightly lower seat height, matching the 2003 N model (unfaired). The compression was increased slightly in the 2005 and 2006 models, and a few other internal items were changed, otherwise remained the same bike as the 2003 model.

The original SV1000 design (K3) has gone through two updates since its original release:

The K4 model - Includes a lowering of the rear-end (as per the 2003 unfaired version), the forks on the 03-04 were replaced with cheaper non-rebuildable cartridge forks.

The K5 model - Black frame, black wheels, shorter airbox trumpet, larger throttle bodies (now 54mm), higher-lift cams, a lighter flywheel, and a higher compression ratio as well as a new ECU. In some markets, Suzuki carries the SZ version with full fairing and GSX-R colour scheme. The K6 model - New selection of colours.

Neither 1000-engined bike sold well, even though the similar 650 cc displacement bikes are award winners and very popular. Suzuki stopped selling the SV1000 naked version in the US in 2004, while the S half fairing version continued through 2007 and by 2008 neither model was listed on the company's global web site.

== See also ==
- Suzuki DL650 VStrom
- Suzuki DL1000 VStrom
