= Suzuki V-Strom 1050 =

Japanese motorcycle

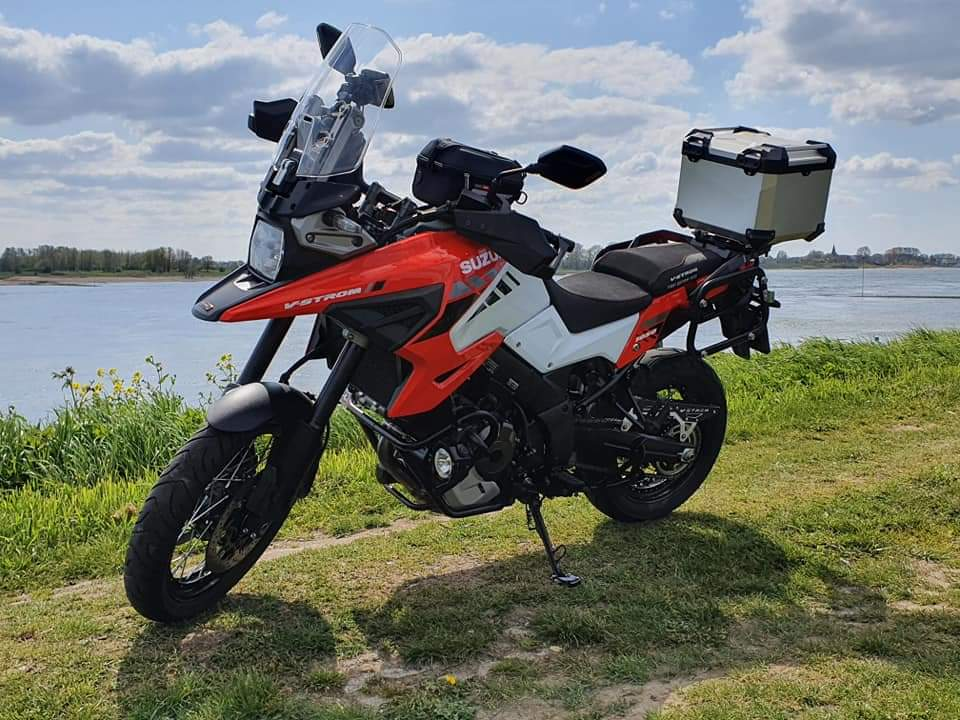
- Suzuki DL1050 V-Strom XT First Edition 25 (Netherlands)
- Manufacturer: Suzuki
- Also called: DL1050 RQM/RCM
- Production: since 2020
- Class: Adventure / dual-sport
- Engine: 1,037 cc (63.3 cu in) liquid-cooled 4-stroke 8-valve DOHC 90° V-twin
- Bore / stroke: 100 mm × 66 mm (3.9 in × 2.6 in)
- Compression ratio: 11,3:1
- Power: 100 bhp (75 kW) at 8,000 rpm
- Torque: 103 N⋅m (76 lbf⋅ft) at 4000 rpm
- Transmission: 6-speed, constant mesh
- Wheelbase: 1,555 mm (61.2 in)
- Dimensions: L: 2,265 mm (89.2 in); W: 940 mm (37 in); H: 1,465 mm (57.7 in)
- Seat height: 850 mm (33 in)
- Weight: 236 kg (520 lb) (dry)
- Fuel capacity: 20.0 L (4.4 imp gal; 5.3 US gal)
- Related: Suzuki V-Strom 1000; Suzuki V-Strom 650; Suzuki V-Strom 250; Suzuki V-Strom 800

The Suzuki V-Strom 1050, also known as the DL1050 (RQM0 - RQM1), is a dual-sport motorcycle with a 1037 cc V-twin engine and a standard riding posture. It has been manufactured in Japan by Suzuki since 2020, as the replacement of the Suzuki V-Strom 1000. The DL1050 was unveiled in 2019 at EICMA by Suzuki and is inspired by the styling of the Suzuki DR-Z series models.

The name V-Strom combines "V" referring to the bike's engine configuration with the German Strom, meaning stream or power.

The V-Strom motorcycle is based on the V-twin engine initially designed for the Suzuki TL1000S and TL1000R motorcycles. It incorporates design elements from other Suzuki motorcycles including fuel injection based on the GSX-R models. 2 smaller-engined versions, the Suzuki V-Strom 250 and Suzuki V-Strom 650 are also manufactured. The DL1050's engine is almost identical to the engine of the 2013 - 2019 model, except now modified to comply to EURO5 emission standards.

== Changes from previous model ==
The V-Strom 1050 had been fully redesigned for 2020 and is inspired by the styling of the Suzuki DR-Z series or more specifically, the Suzuki DR-Z Dakar and Dual-sport Suzuki DR-BIG. The lines in the bodywork are sharper and the beak-like front cowl is now fully incorporated in the fairings. Also the 2020 V-Strom 1050 has several technological improvements. It has drive by wire dual electronic throttle assemblies, a traction control system with four sensitivity modes, a three-mode Drive Mode Selector (S-DMS) and an Easy Start System. The instruments are displayed on a new full LCD dashboard.

== Model versions ==
=== Suzuki V-Strom DL1050 RQM ===
The DL1050 RQM is the base model V-Strom 1050.

=== Suzuki V-Strom DL1050 XT RCM ===
The DL1050 XT RCM is the more equipped version of the DL1050 RQM. This version is standard equipped with parts such as an aluminum under cowling, accessory bar, knuckle cover, LED turn signals, center stand, an adjustable seat and windscreen and a 12V DC-socket. Also, this version is available in multiple colour schemes, which are a tribute to the Suzuki DR-Z Dakar models. The DL1050 XT is also equipped with S.I.R.S. (Suzuki Intelligent Ride System). This system provides Cruise Control, Hill-Hold Control, Track Brake system, Slope Dependent Control and Load Dependent Control.

=== Suzuki V-Strom DL1050 XTA RCM ===
The DL1050 XT Adventure RCM is the highest equipped version in the V-Strom line-up. This version comes standard with aluminium panniers and heated grips and has more options than the DL1050 and the DL1050 XT apart from being equipped with the full feature list of the XT.
