= Suzuki DR-Z125 =

Suzuki dirt bike

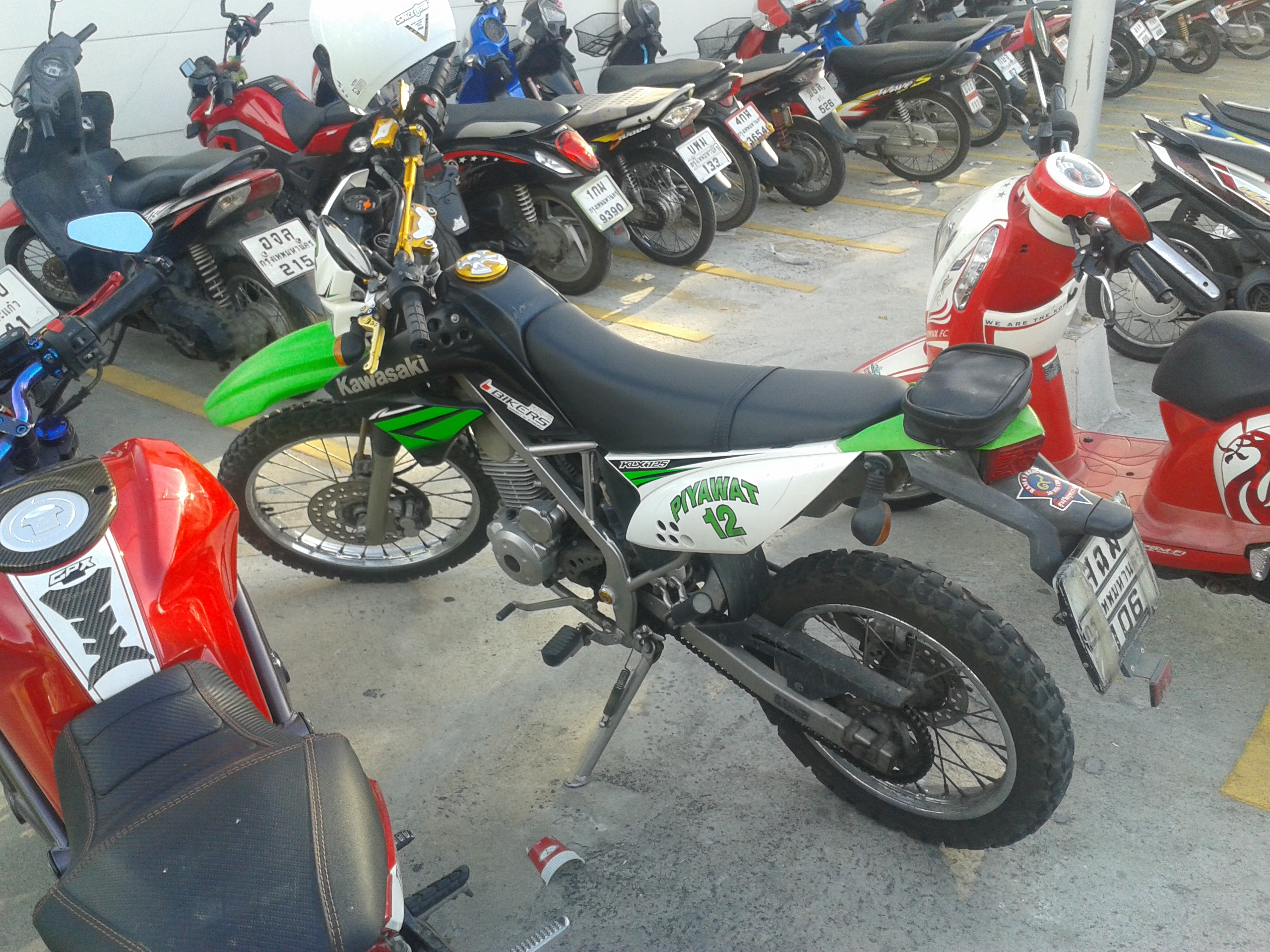
- The Kawasaki KLX125, a rebadged Suzuki DR-Z125
- Manufacturer: Suzuki
- Predecessor: DR125
- Class: Dual-sport
- Engine: 124.5 cc (7.60 cu in) 4-stroke single
- Transmission: 5-speed manual, constant-mesh, chain-drive
- Weight: 79 kg (174 lb) (dry)
- Fuel capacity: 66 L (15 imp gal; 17 US gal)
- Related: Suzuki DR-Z400

The Suzuki DR-Z125 is a dirt bike manufactured by Suzuki as part of the Suzuki DR-Z series from 2003 to present. It was also sold as the Kawasaki KLX125 from 2003 to 2006. Most major parts are interchangeable between both early Kawasaki and Suzuki models as the Kawasaki is simply a rebranded DR-Z 125.

Later Suzuki models feature slightly different body panels which will not fit directly on earlier models. All models are intended for off-road trail use. Although the target audience for the motorcycle is the youth and small adult market, it is also available in "L" version which feature larger front and back wheels and sprockets. This version is designed to accommodate larger adult riders. The "L" version is also equipped with hydraulic disc brakes in the front.
