= Bimota SB8K =

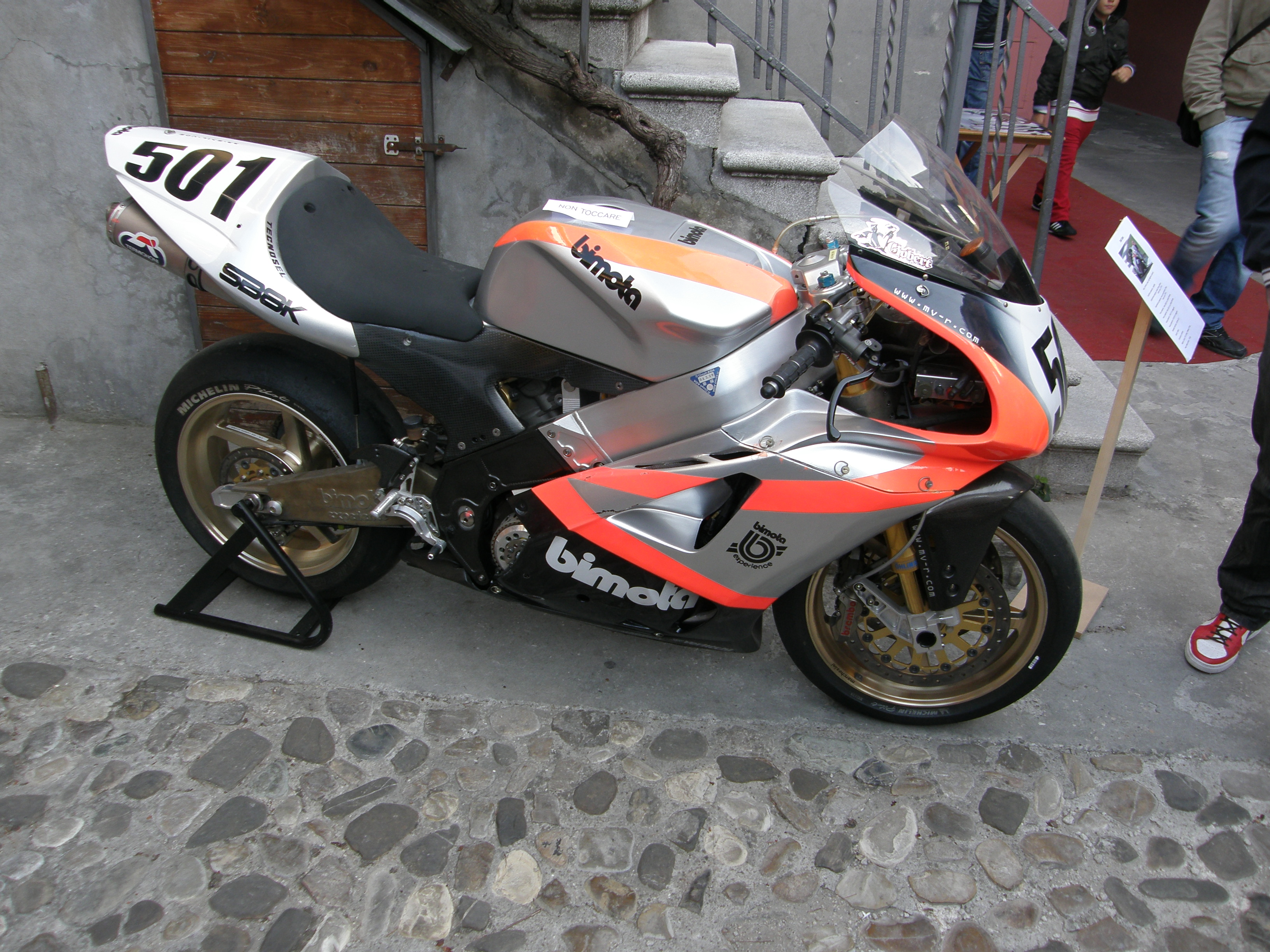
- Manufacturer: Bimota
- Production: 1998-2006
- Class: Sport bike
- Engine: Suzuki TL 1000 R, 90° V-twin cylinder, 4 valve per cylinder; liquid cooled, 4-stroke
- Transmission: 6-speed sequential, chain drive, with multiple clutch in oil bath
- Wheelbase: 1390 mm / 54.7 in
- Seat height: 810 mm / 31.9 in
- Weight: 182.0 kg (dry)
- Fuel capacity: 21 L / 5.6 US gal

The SB8K is a sportbike made by Italian motorcycle manufacturer Bimota.

The bike was added to the present lineup after the company hiatus in the late 1990s financial crisis. The bike was built with a profusion of light alloys and carbon fiber; the materials employed in the construction of the chassis are the most advanced materials available today. Carbon fiber is used for the fairing, as well as for the construction of the fuel tank, which was built utilizing the same techniques applied to parts for the Motorcycle Grand Prix racebike. Many elements of the SB8K are meticulously machined from aluminum alloy, a distinctive hallmark for all classic and current Bimota products.

The "SB" series means the powerplant beneath the bike frame was taken directly from the Suzuki TL1000R, and has been highly tuned by engineers to deliver more power output & torque at all engine speeds.

The SB8K is the only production bike in the world using Bimota's own radial injector fuel injection (Radial EFI).

The racing version, SB8R participated in 2000 season of Superbike World Championship with Anthony Gobert victory for Race 1 in Phillip Island. This to be the first and only win for Bimota and SB8R.

== Chassis ==
The SB8K has a distinctive frame that wraps around the TL1000R motor, where the upper frame is built of lightweight alloy and the lower footrest section consists of two carbon fibre plates with a box structure to reduce the frame and bike overall weight. The result is a lighter frame with the best possible rigidity over lightness ratio, the frame just weighing 185 kg on road with exceptional rigidity.
