= Suzuki TL1000S =

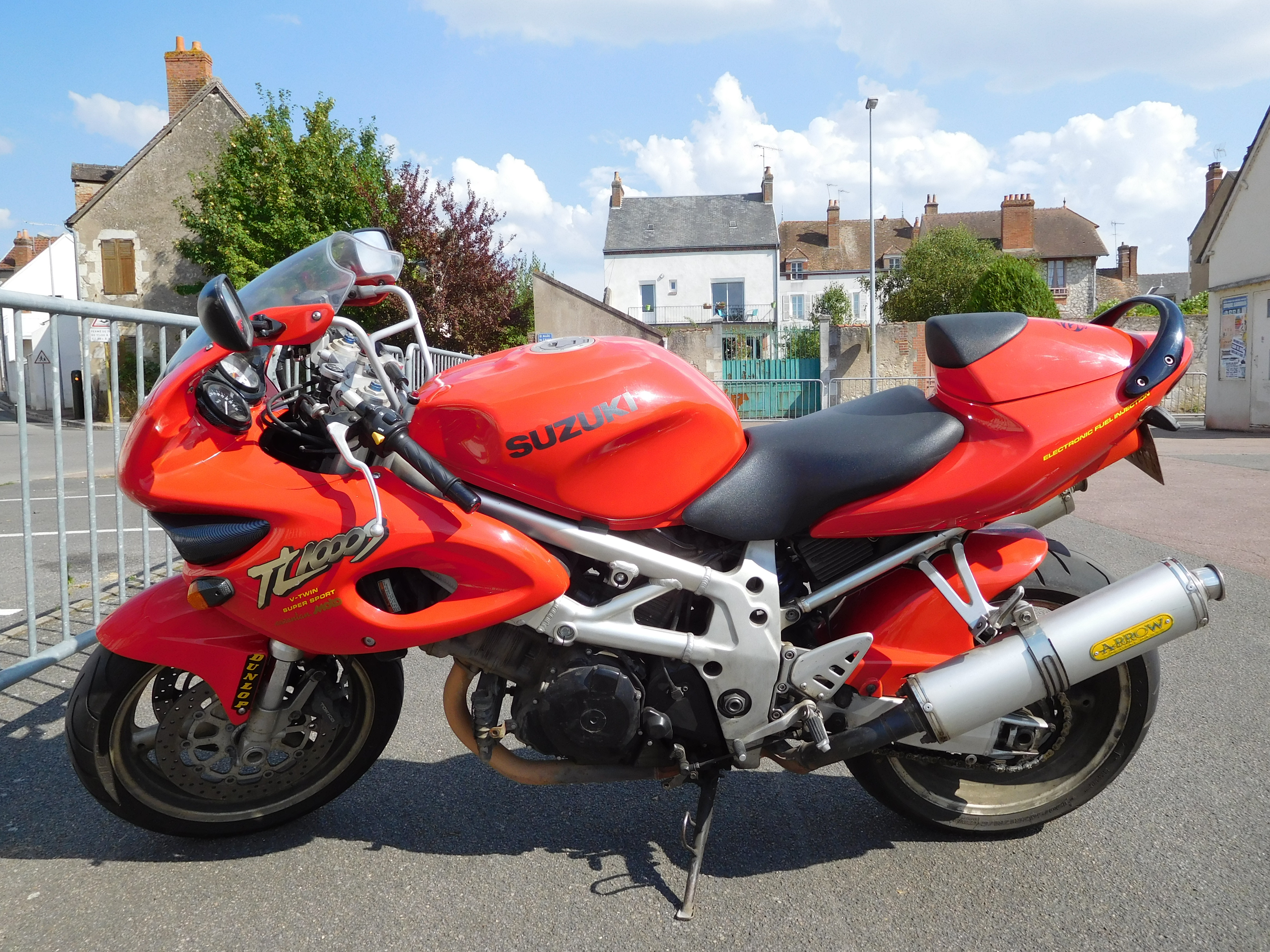
- Manufacturer: Suzuki
- Production: 1997–2001
- Successor: Suzuki SV1000S
- Class: Sport bike
- Engine: Water cooled DOHC 996 cc (60.8 cu in) 90° transverse V-twin
- Compression ratio: 11.3:1
- Top speed: 165 mph (266 km/h)
- Power: 125 hp (93 kW) @ 8500 rpm
- Torque: 79 lb⋅ft (107 N⋅m) @ 7,100 rpm
- Transmission: 6-speed, chain
- Frame type: Alloy oval section trellis frame
- Suspension: 43mm USD forks with adjustable preload, rebound, and compression damping
- Rake, trail: 94 mm (3.7 in)
- Wheelbase: 55.7 in (1,410 mm)
- Dimensions: L: 80.5 in (2,040 mm); W: 28.1 in (710 mm)
- Seat height: 32.9 in (840 mm)
- Weight: 411 lb (186 kg) (dry)
- Fuel capacity: 17 L (3.7 imp gal; 4.5 US gal), 4.5 L (0.99 imp gal; 1.2 US gal) reserve
- Related: Suzuki TL1000R

The Suzuki TL1000S was a Suzuki V-twin roadster sport bike made from 1997–2001. It is frequently referred to as the TLS or Suzuki TLS. It is notable for the 90° V-twin engine which is still used in Suzuki's modern SV1000 and V-Strom 1000 motorcycles.

Due to its problems, it has earned the title of ‘The Widowmaker’. Suzuki issued a global recall of the TLS after several incidents to install a new damper, which became standard in later-year models.

== History ==
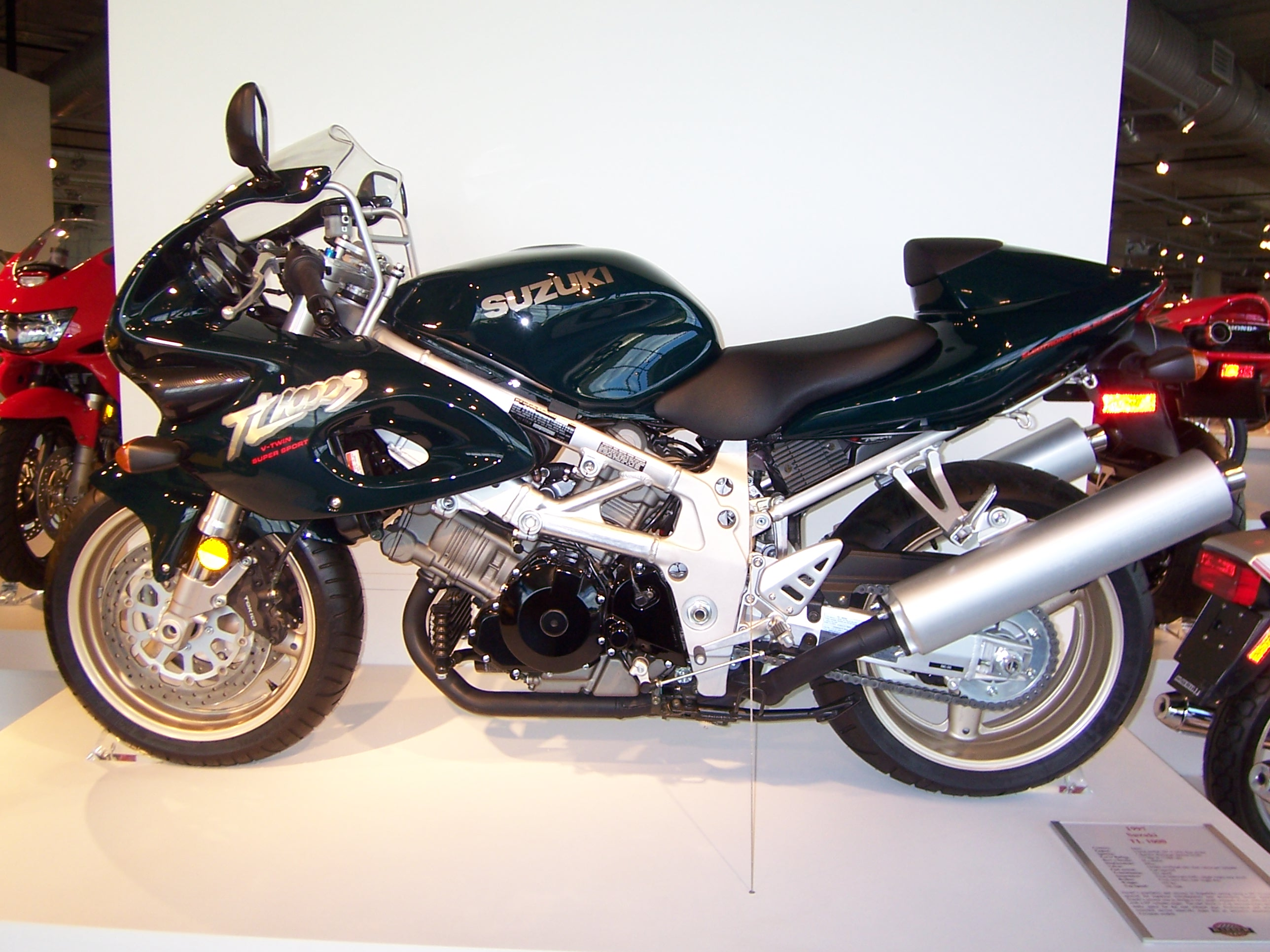
1997 Suzuki TL1000S

The Suzuki TL1000S was introduced by Suzuki in 1997 in order to compete with the Ducati 916 in World Superbike Championship, but the bike was never used by any factory team or any Suzuki backed team.

== Specification ==
The TLS motor featured a 90° V-twin for perfect primary balance and had hybrid chain/gear driven cams. A traditional cam chain turned a gear that in turn rotated the cams. This hybrid design eased maintenance immensely and gave the motor additional aural character because of the gear whine. The motor was also used as basis for the Suzuki TL1000R. Suzuki also sold many of the TL motors to Cagiva to be used in the Navigator and V-Raptor models. Bimota also used the engine for their popular Bimota SB8K.

=== Rear shock ===
V-twin engines are longer from front to rear. In order to keep the wheelbase as short as possible, the rear shock absorber/damper was separated from the spring. The spring was located on the right side of the bike and employed a rotary style rear damper that provided its damping characteristics through rotating arms. This 'rotary' damper would overheat the oil under heavy use and can lead to a complete loss of damping. Many have now had this damper set up replaced with coil over shock units like 'Ohlins' etc.
