= Suzuki DR-Z series =

The Suzuki DR-Z Series includes the following motorcycles:

- Suzuki DR-Z4S
- Suzuki DR-Z4SM
- Suzuki DR-Z50
- Suzuki DR-Z70
- Suzuki DR-Z110
- Suzuki DR-Z125
- Suzuki DR-Z125L
- Suzuki DR-Z250
- Suzuki DR-Z400E
- Suzuki DR-Z400S
- Suzuki DR-Z400SM
- Suzuki DR-Z800
