= Suzuki V-Strom 800 =

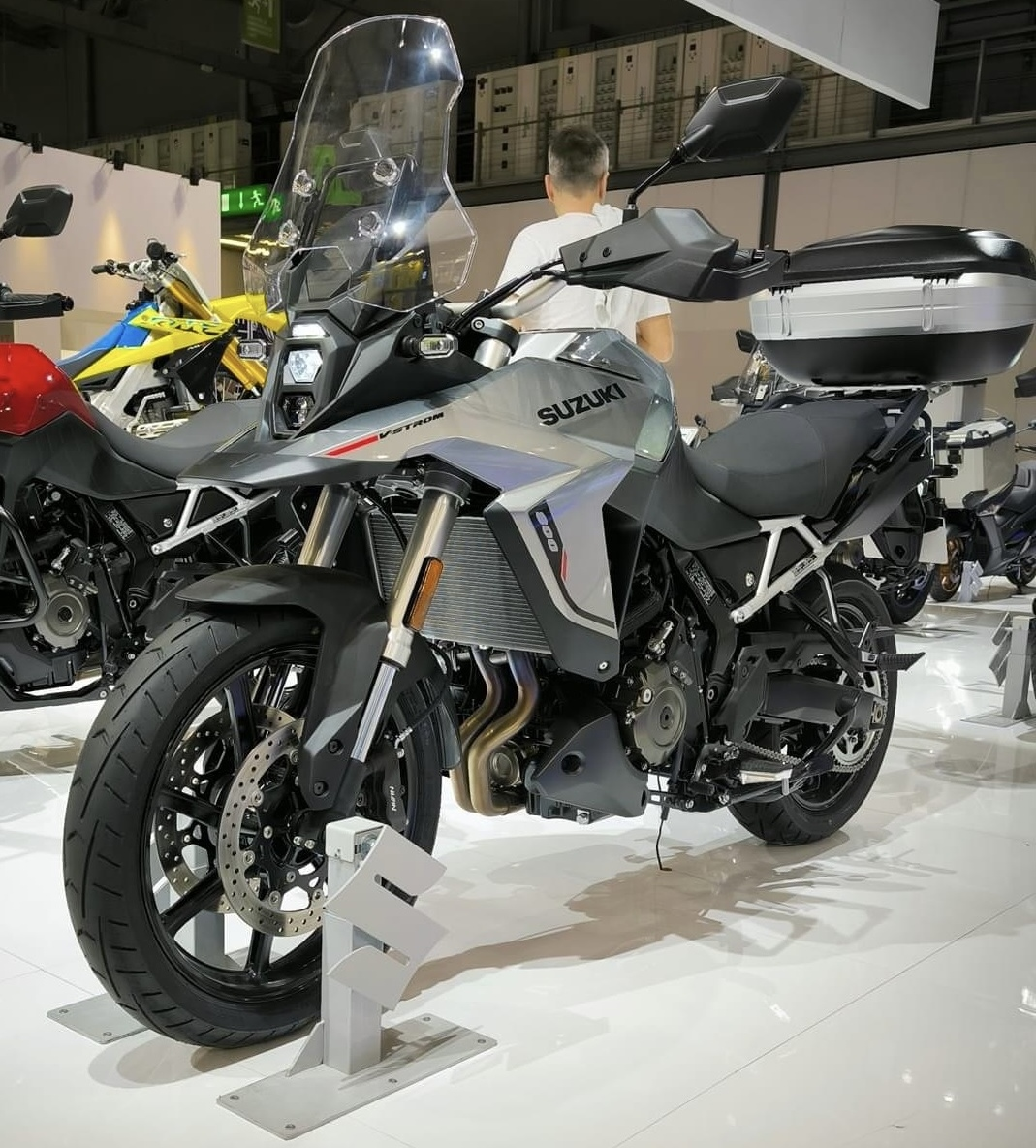
- Manufacturer: Suzuki
- Production: since 2023
- Class: Dual-sport
- Engine: 776 cc (47.4 cu in) liquid-cooled 4-stroke 8-valve DOHC 270° Parallel twin
- Bore / stroke: 84 mm × 70 mm (3.3 in × 2.8 in)
- Compression ratio: 12,8:1
- Power: 84 bhp (63 kW) at 8,500 rpm
- Torque: 78 N⋅m (58 lbf⋅ft) at 6800 rpm
- Transmission: 6-speed, constant mesh, final drive chain
- Wheelbase: 1,515 mm (59.6 in)
- Dimensions: L: 2,255 mm (88.8 in); W: 905 mm (35.6 in); H: 1,355 mm (53.3 in)
- Weight: 223 kg (492 lb) (dry); 230 kg (510 lb) (wet)
- Fuel capacity: 20 L (4.4 imp gal; 5.3 US gal)
- Related: Suzuki V-Strom 650; Suzuki V-Strom 250; Suzuki V-Strom 1050

The Suzuki V-Strom 800 is a dual-sport motorcycle produced by Suzuki, which was presented at the EICMA in 2022. It includes the more off-road version V-Strom 800 DE (Dual Explorer).

Within the previous V-Strom models, this model is located between the 650 (with 645 cc displacement) and the 1050 (with 1037 cc displacement).

== Specifications ==
The frame is made of tubular steel and steel profiles. It has an upside-down telescopic fork. The steering head angle is 62 degrees. At the rear, the frame has a two-armed aluminum rear swing arm with a central spring strut. The size of the rear wheel is 17 inches. The front wheel is 19 inches, 21 inches on the 800 DE model. The machine has ABS with off-road mode. The suspension travel is 150 mm or 220 mm on the 800 DE.

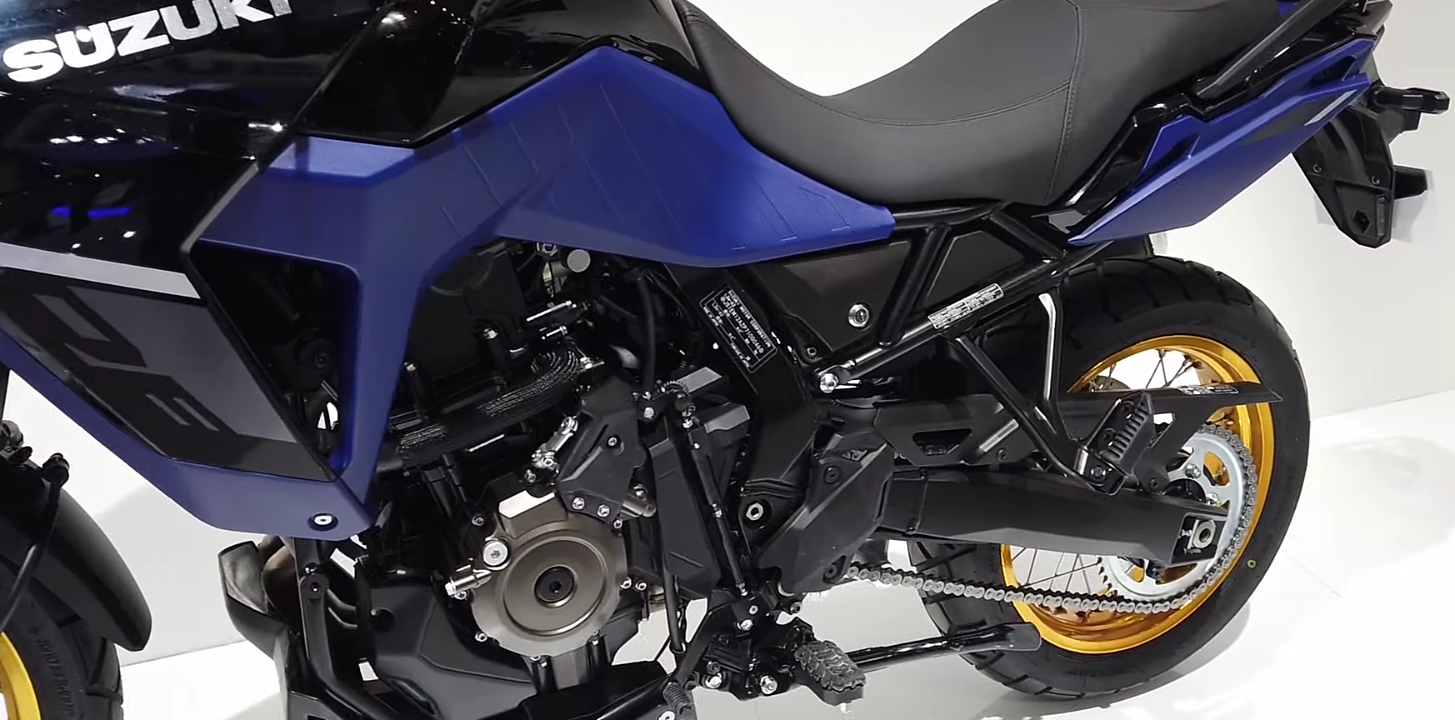
View of the V-Strom 800

Unlike the previous V-Strom models and unlike the name suggests, the V-Strom 800 has a two-cylinder in-line engine with four valves per cylinder, two overhead camshafts and two balance shafts (cross balancer). The bore is 84 millimeters and the stroke 70 millimeters. The crank pins are offset by 270 degrees. The engine is water-cooled and has an electronic throttle control ("ride by wire"). The V-Strom 800 has a 6-speed gearbox with a so-called "quickshifter", which allows gear changes without manual clutch operation. The drive is electronically supported with a four-stage slip control (on the 800 DE with mode for gravel [G, Gravel] for limited slip), automatic start and speed increase when starting (Low RPM Assist). There are three driving modes. Consumption in the WMTC cycle is 4.4 L/100 km. The tank holds 20 liters.

The consumer is informed by a TFT-LCD color display. There is also a USB socket on the cockpit.
