= Suzuki DR800S =

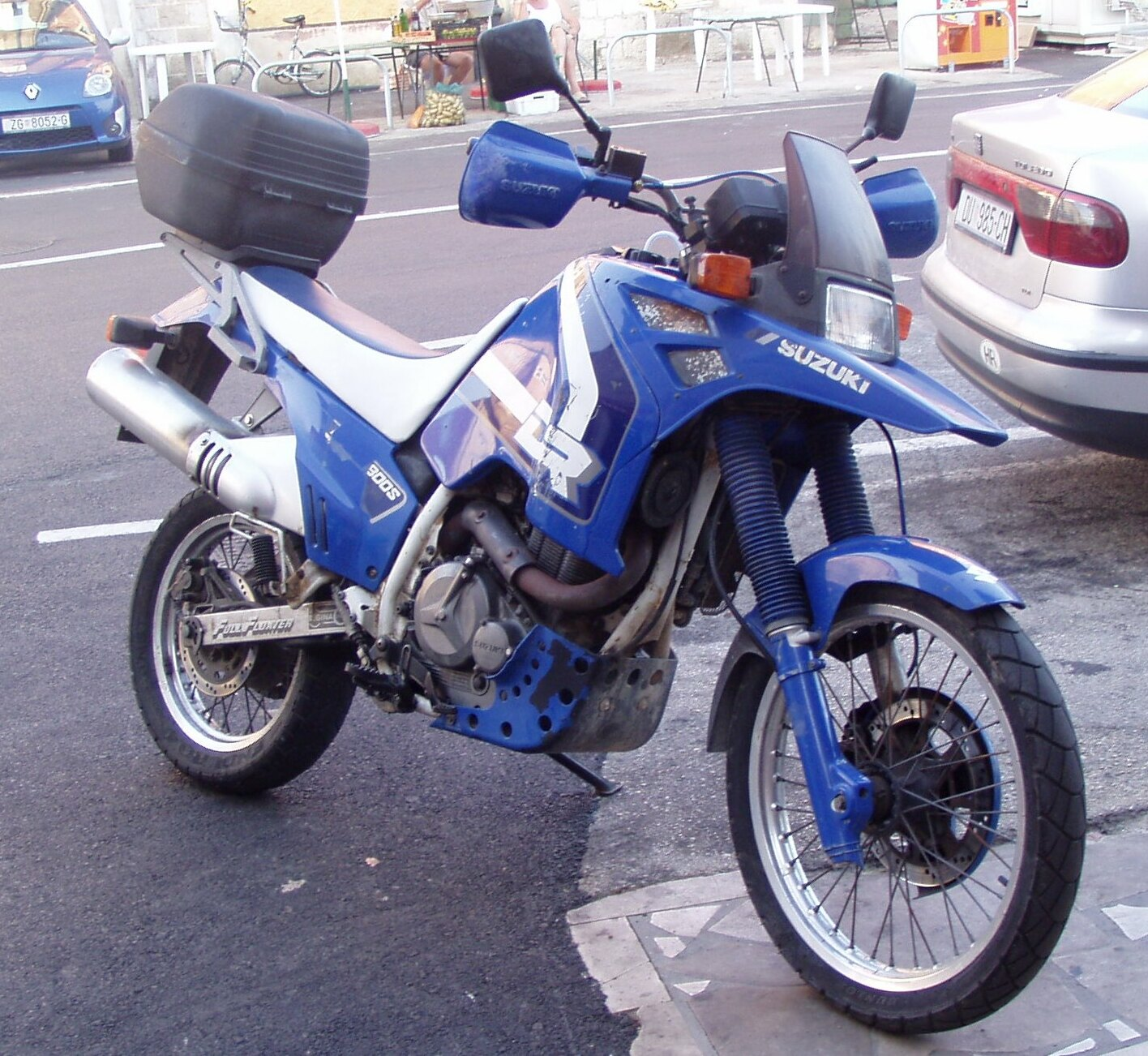
- Manufacturer: Suzuki
- Production: 1990-1999
- Assembly: Japan
- Predecessor: Suzuki DR750S
- Successor: Suzuki V-Strom 1000
- Engine: 779 cc (47.5 cu in), 4-stroke, SOHC, 4-valve, air/oil cooled, single
- Bore / stroke: 105 mm × 90 mm (4.1 in × 3.5 in)
- Power: 54 hp (40 kW)@ 6,600 rpm
- Torque: 59 N⋅m (44 lbf⋅ft)@ 5,400 rpm
- Transmission: 5-speed
- Suspension: Telescopic fork, link type swingarm
- Tires: F: 90/90-21; R: 130/80-17
- Dimensions: L: 2,255 mm (88.8 in)
- Weight: 185 kg (408 lb) (wet)

The Suzuki DR800S is a 779 cc (47.5 cu in) single-cylinder dual-sport motorcycle made by Suzuki from 1990 to 1999.

== History and development ==
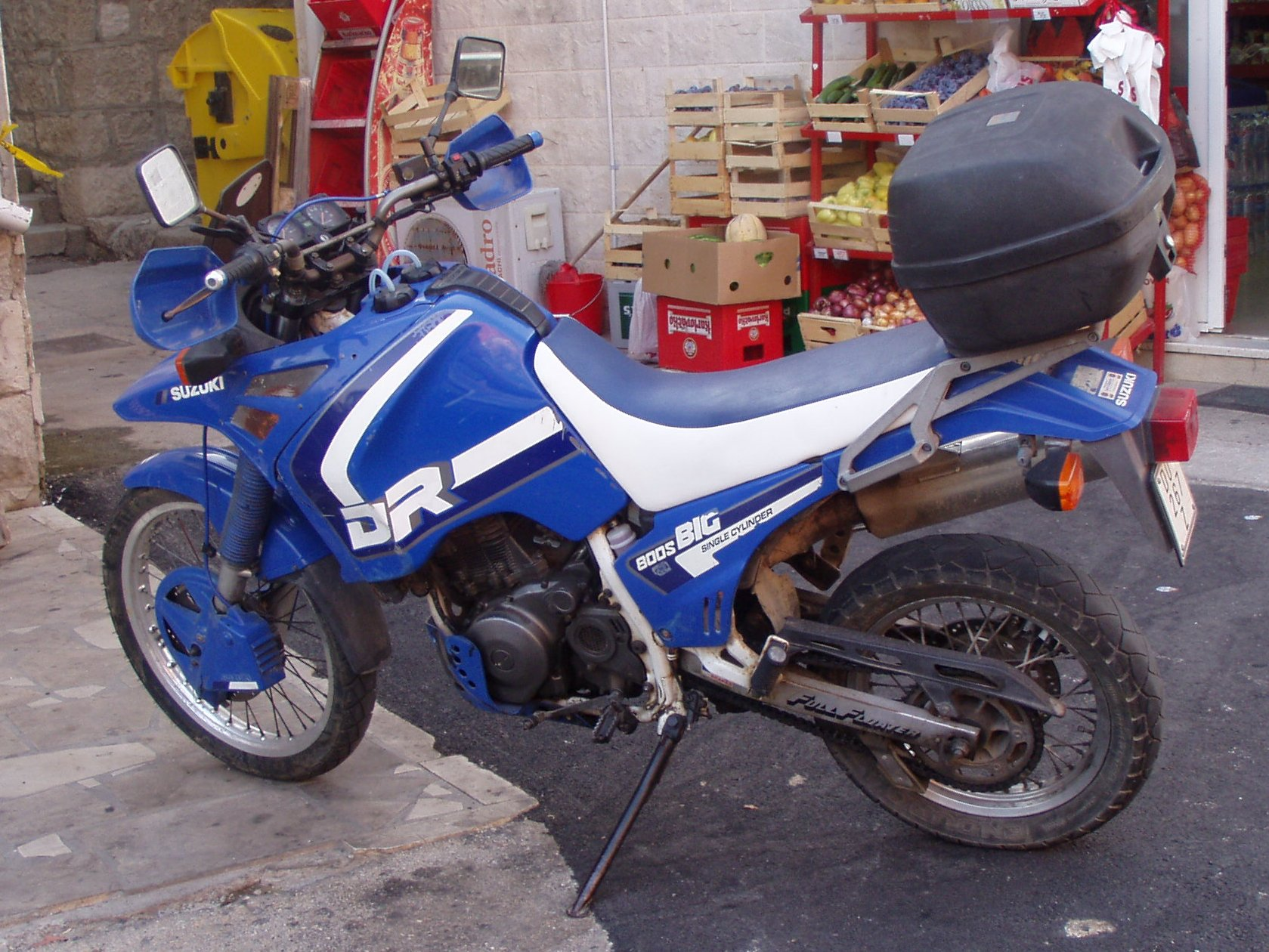

The DR800S (also called DR Big 800S or DR800S Big) is a motorcycle produced by the Japanese motorcycle manufacturer Suzuki. The bike is powered by a single-cylinder four-stroke engine with an air/oil-cooled SACS (Suzuki Advanced Cooling System) cooling system available in the single displacement of 779 cm^{3}, which delivers 54 HP at 6600 rpm and a maximum torque of 59 Nm at 5400 rpm.

At the time of launch, it was the production bike with the largest single-cylinder architecture engine, remaining so even after.

The engine is fed by two Mikuni carburettors assisted by a "twin spark" transistor electronic double ignition system with two spark plugs, having a timing chain-operated SOHC with 4 valves and equipped with double countershafts to reduce the strong vibrations typical of single-cylinder engines, with wet sump lubrication.

Primary transmission is via gears and a mechanically operated wet multi-plate clutch, assisted by a five-speed gearbox. Power is transmitted to the rear wheel via chain.

The frame is of the double cradle type in steel with a square section.
