= Suzuki V-Strom 250 =

Dual-sport motorcycle with a 248 cc engine

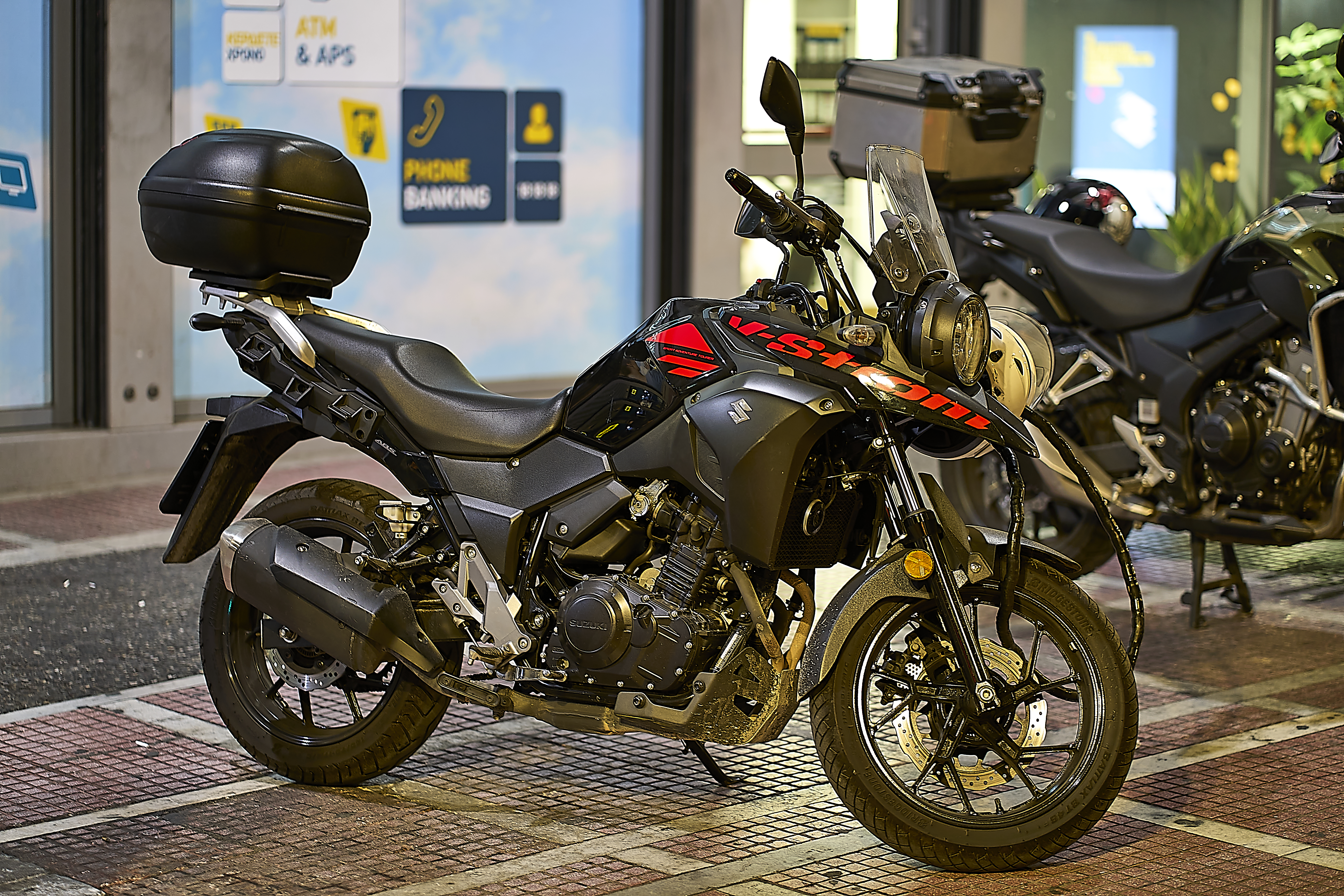
- Manufacturer: Suzuki
- Also called: DL250 AL and DL250 AM
- Production: since 2017
- Class: Adventure / dual-sport
- Engine: 248 cc (15.1 cu in) J517 liquid-cooled 4-stroke SOHC 4-valve I2
- Bore / stroke: 53.5 mm × 55.2 mm (2.11 in × 2.17 in)
- Power: 24 PS (17.7 kW; 23.7 bhp) at 8,000rpm
- Torque: 22 N⋅m (16.2 lb⋅ft) at 6,500rpm
- Transmission: 6-speed, constant mesh
- Wheelbase: 1,425 mm (56.1 in)
- Dimensions: L: 2,150 mm (84.6 in); W: 790 mm (31.1 in); H: 1,295 mm (51.0 in)
- Seat height: 800 mm (31.5 in)
- Weight: 188 kg (414 lb) (wet)
- Fuel capacity: 17.3 L (3.8 imp gal; 4.6 US gal)
- Fuel consumption: 39 km/L (92 mpg_{‑US}; 110 mpg_{‑imp}) at 60 km/h
- Related: Suzuki GW250; Suzuki GSX250R

The Suzuki V-Strom 250, also known as the DL250 (AL and AM), is an adventure touring motorcycle with a 248 cc Straight-twin engine and a standard riding posture. It has been manufactured in China by Suzuki since 2017, as an entry in the lighter adventure motorcycle in the line of the Suzuki V-Strom 650, Suzuki V-Strom 1000 and the Suzuki V-Strom 1050. The DL250 is implemented to compete with the BMW G310R and the 250/300 cc Kawasaki Versys. The DL250 was unveiled in 2017 by Suzuki and was originally intended for the Asian market.

The name V-Strom is chosen to keep the DL250 in line with the other V-Strom models and combines "V" referring to the larger V-Stroms engine configuration with the German Strom, meaning stream or power. Even though the DL250 does not contain a V-twin engine, but a parallel 2-cylinder engine. Suzuki officials have also stated that the "V" was meant to indicate versatility, given the multi-purpose nature of the V-Strom line.

The DL250 motorcycle is based on the straight-twin 2-cylinder engine initially designed for the GW250/Inazuma 250 and GSX250R. From its release in 2017 until 2020 the bike was available in the European, Australian and Asian market. As of 2021, the V-Strom 250 is no longer available in markets other than the Asian market. A single cylinder variant of the same name is now being manufactured in India and is sold in South Asia, South East Asia, Japan and Australia

== Features ==
The Suzuki V-Strom 250's design is in resemblance of the larger V-strom bikes, including the beak-like front fairing. With the discontinuation of the non-abs the bike is standard equipped with ABS. The bike is also equipped with an aluminium under cowl. The instruments are displayed on a new full LCD dashboard, which also contains a 12V DC-charger.

== Optional equipment ==
Because the Suzuki V-Strom is aimed towards a commuter, daily usage and light adventure market, there are several options a user can choose. The options include aluminium panniers, centre stand, hand guards and mirror extension kits.
