= Suzuki GW250 =

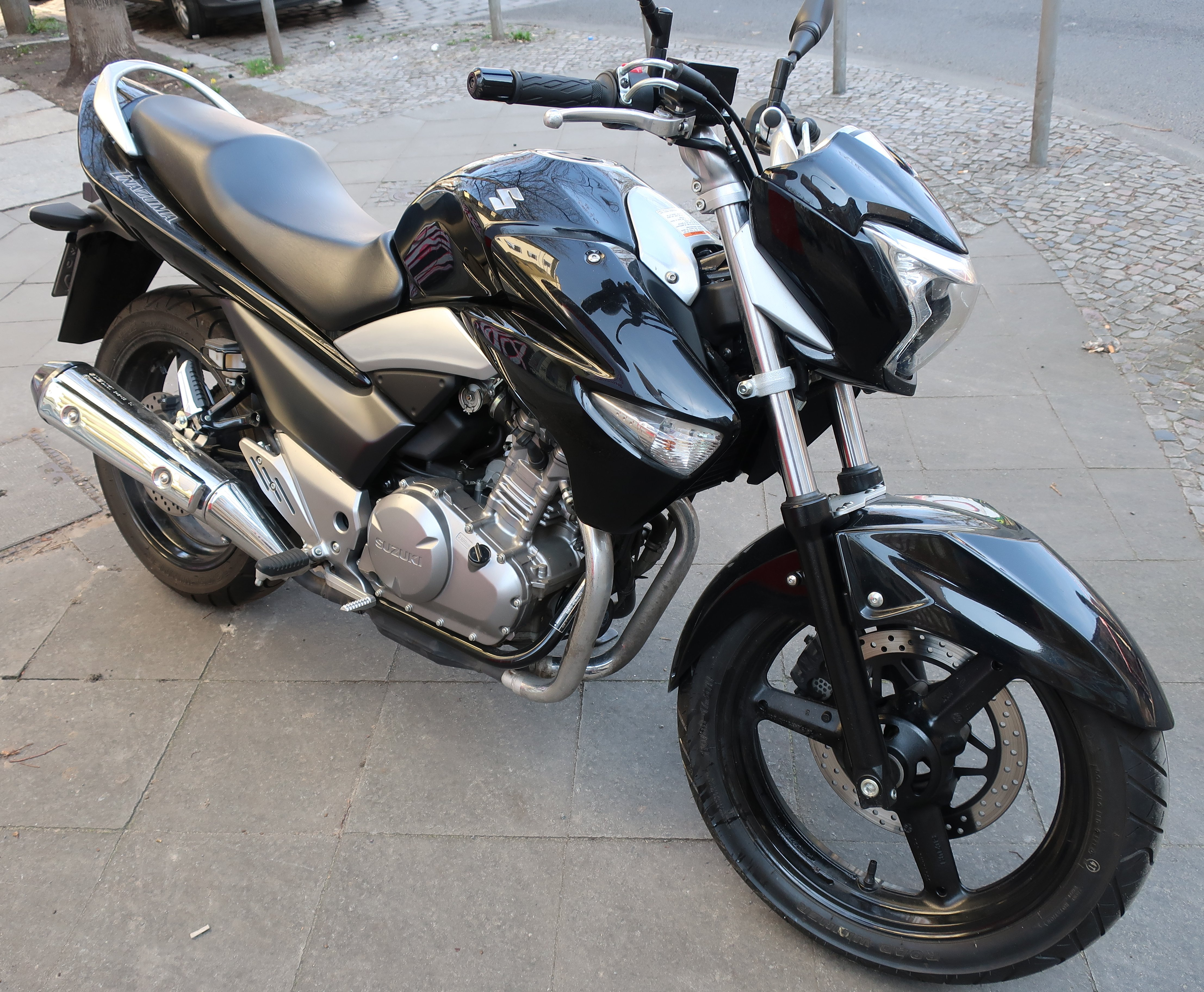
- Manufacturer: Suzuki
- Also called: Inazuma 250 (EU) or GSR250 (Japan)
- Production: 2012-2018
- Predecessor: GW250 Thunder
- Class: Standard
- Engine: 248 cc (15.1 cu in), 4-stroke, inline-twin, liquid-cooled, SOHC
- Bore / stroke: 53.5 mm × 55.2 mm (2.1 in × 2.2 in)
- Compression ratio: 11.5:1
- Power: 24–26 hp (18–19 kW) @ 8,500 rpm (claimed); 21.2 hp (16 kW) @ 8,200 rpm (rear wheel)
- Torque: 17.7–18.6 lb⋅ft (24–25 N⋅m) @ 6,500 rpm (claimed); 14.8 lb⋅ft (20 N⋅m) @ 6,600 rpm (rear wheel)
- Ignition type: Electric
- Transmission: 6 speed Manual
- Frame type: Tubular
- Suspension: Front: 37mm Telescopic, coil spring, oil damped. Rear: Swingarm, coil spring, oil damped (Both Kayaba)
- Brakes: Disc (Nissin)
- Tires: Front: 110/80-17M/C 57H. Rear: 140/70-17M/C 66H (Both IRC)
- Rake, trail: 26° 105 mm (4.1 in)
- Wheelbase: 1,430 mm (56.3 in)
- Dimensions: L: 2,145 mm (84.4 in); W: 760 mm (29.9 in); H: 1,075 mm (42.3 in)
- Seat height: 780 mm (30.7 in)
- Weight: 170 kg (375 lb) (dry); 182–183 kg (401–403 lb) (wet)
- Fuel capacity: 13.3 L (3.5 US gal)
- Oil capacity: 2.1 L (0.6 US gal)
- Turning radius: 2.5 m (8.2 ft)

The Suzuki GW250 is a 248 cc (15.1 cu in) entry-level standard motorcycle sold in multiple markets, including Australia, Asia and Europe.

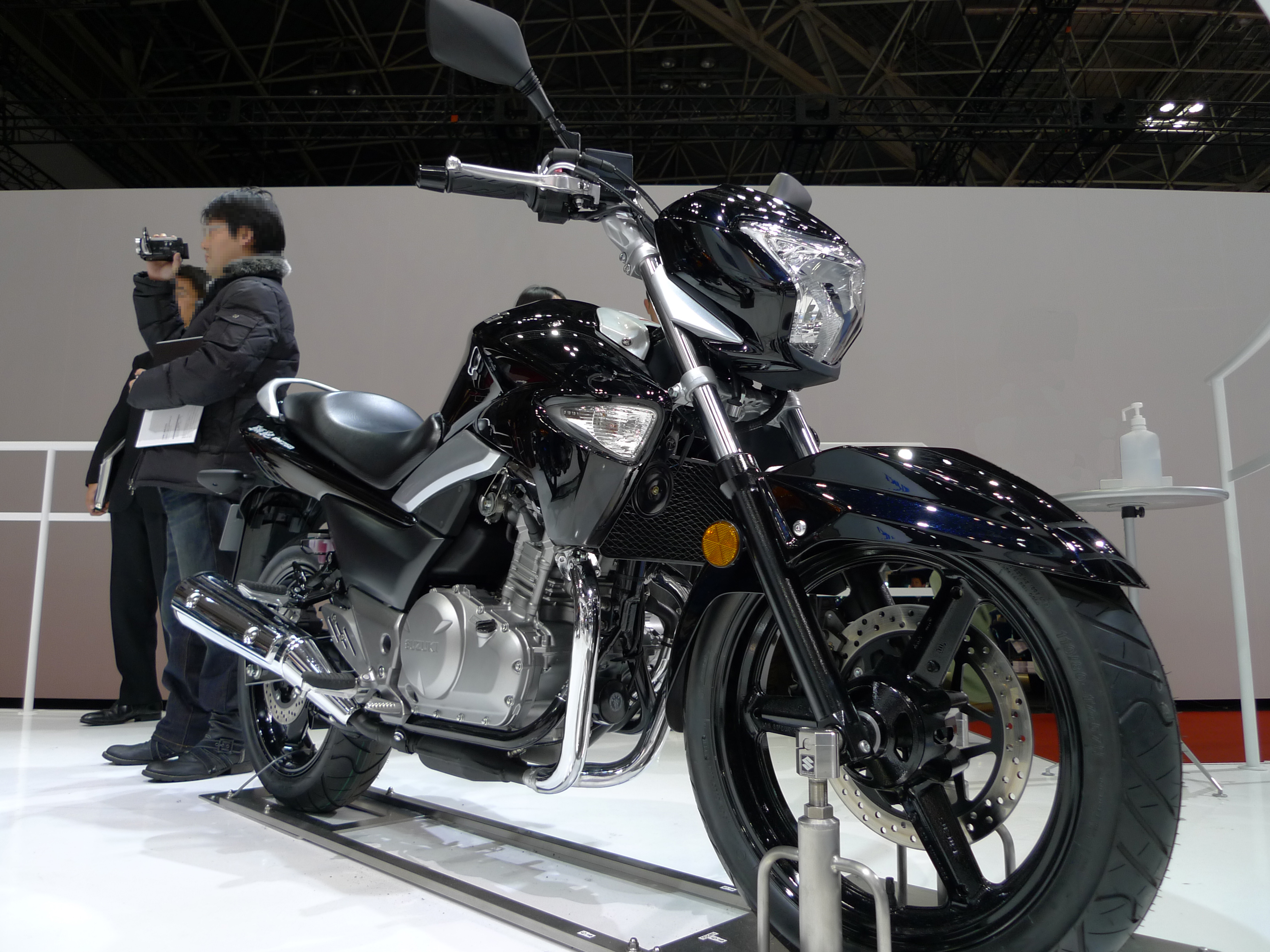
Suzuki GW250 at the Tokyo Motor Show

It is called the Inazuma 250 in the EU and the GSR250 in Japan. There is also an F (or) S version (250F, 250S) which is the faired version of the bike for some markets outside of the EU. It is used by various police services including China, Japan and USA. Due to EU safety regulations, Inazuma was discontinued in Europe, as ABS is mandatory from 1/2017 for all motorcycles with more than 125cc, and there are no plans for ABS equipped Inazuma.

On the instrument panel there is an analogue RPM meter in the centre, which contains a digital gear selector indicator. It also has a shift-light pre-programmed to light in three RPM ranges. The speedometer is digital, and there are two trip meters.

While it was praised in the media for having a high build quality and being easy to ride, it was criticised for having "overall sober styling".
