= Suzuki DR-Z400 =

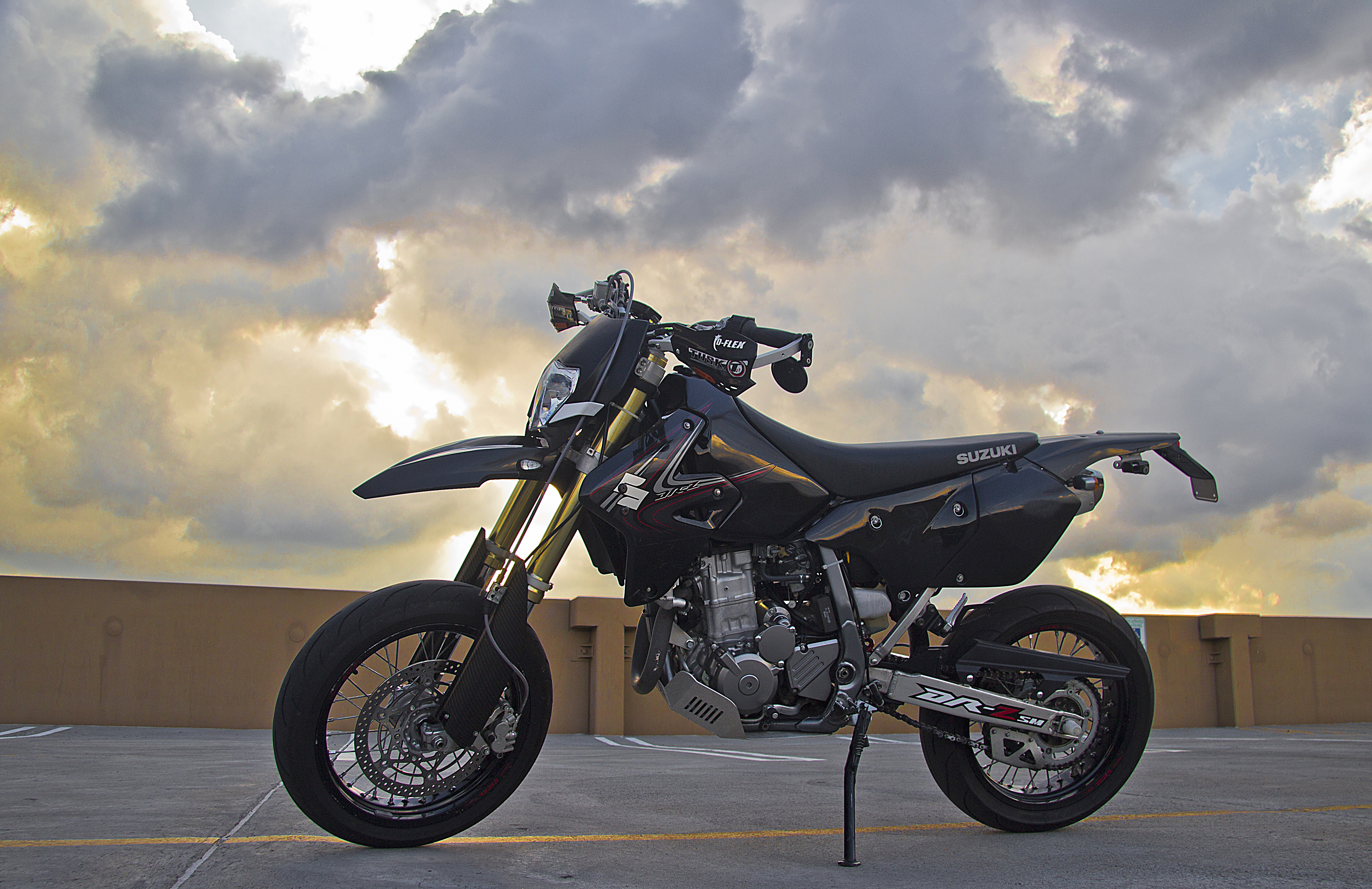
- 2007 DRZ-400SM
- Manufacturer: Suzuki
- Predecessor: DR350
- Successor: DR-Z4S
- Class: Dual-sport
- Engine: 398 cc (24.3 cu in) 4-stroke single
- Bore / stroke: 90.0 mm × 62.6 mm (3.54 in × 2.46 in)
- Compression ratio: 11.3:1
- Top speed: 94 mph (151 km/h)
- Power: 39 hp (29 kW) @ 7,600 rpm
- Torque: 39.2 N⋅m (28.9 lb⋅ft) @ 6,600 rpm
- Transmission: 5-speed manual, constant-mesh, chain-drive
- Frame type: Diamond Block
- Brakes: Disc
- Seat height: E/S: 935 mm (36.8 in); SM: 890 mm (35.0 in)
- Weight: 144 kg (317 lb) (S version) (wet)
- Fuel capacity: 10 L (2.2 imp gal; 2.6 US gal)
- Fuel consumption: 44.4 mpg_{‑US} (5.30 L/100 km; 53.3 mpg_{‑imp})
- Related: Suzuki DR-Z125

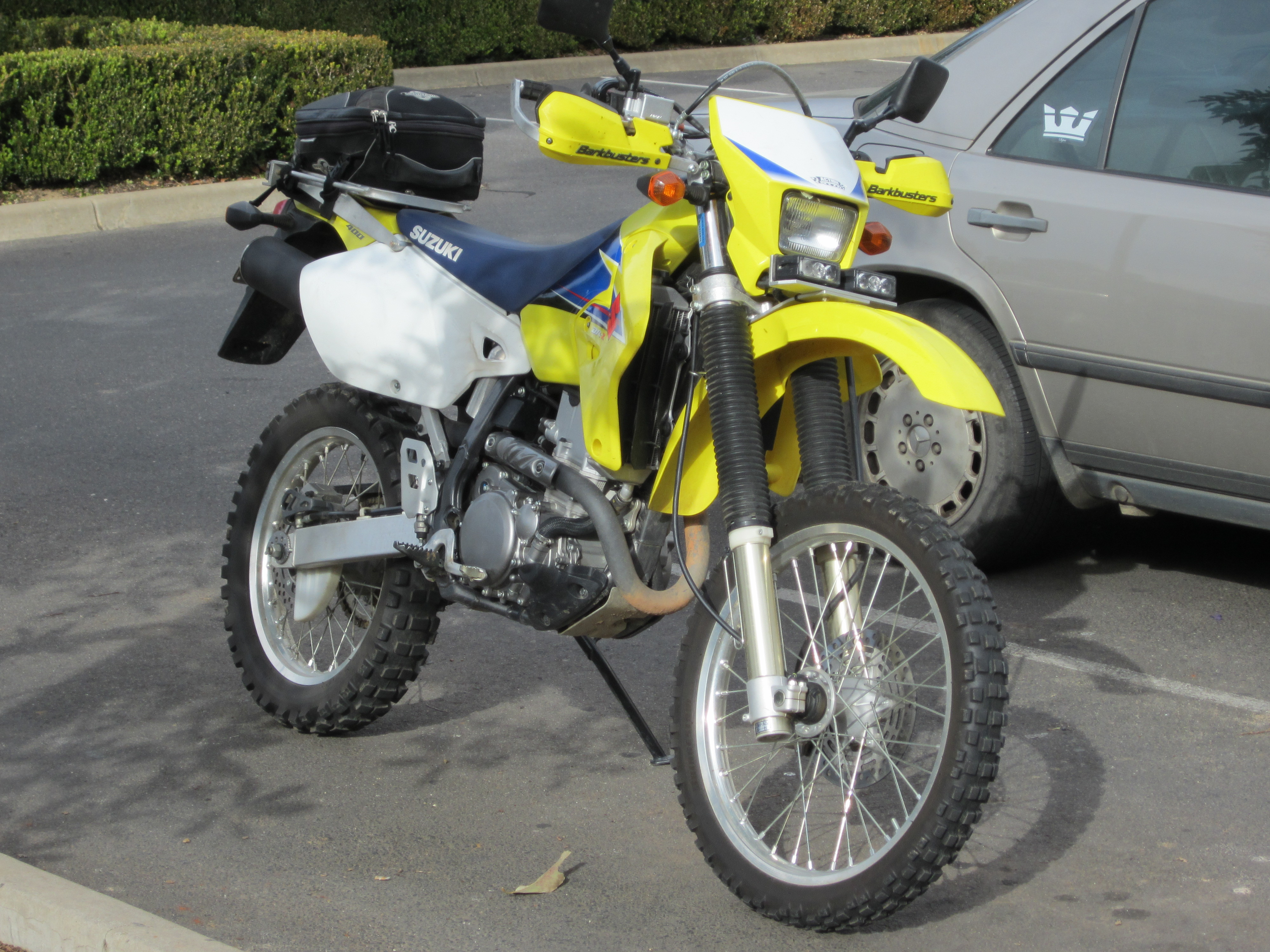
DR-Z400S

The Suzuki DR-Z400 is a dual-sport motorcycle manufactured by Suzuki beginning in 2000. It is powered by a single-cylinder, 398 cc (24.3 cu in), carbureted, liquid-cooled four-stroke engine.

== History ==
Kawasaki marketed a private labeled version of the DR-Z known as the KLX400 – it is nearly identical to the DR-Z400 except for bodywork and some accessories.

The DR-Z is used by the Australian Army and is slightly modified for the Army role.

The DR-Z400 has been produced in four variants:

- DR-Z400 - kick-start only, not street legal (US), possibly street legal (AUS).
- DR-Z400E - electric-start, not street legal (US), street legal (AUS) kick-start.
- DR-Z400S - street legal (headlight, taillight, turn signals, mirrors and electric start).
- DR-Z400SM - Supermoto, first year 2005, street legal, comes standard with 17-inch (430 mm) sportbike inspired wheels, oversize front and rear brakes, RMZ rear swing-arm and inverted forks.
