= Suzuki V-Strom 1000 =

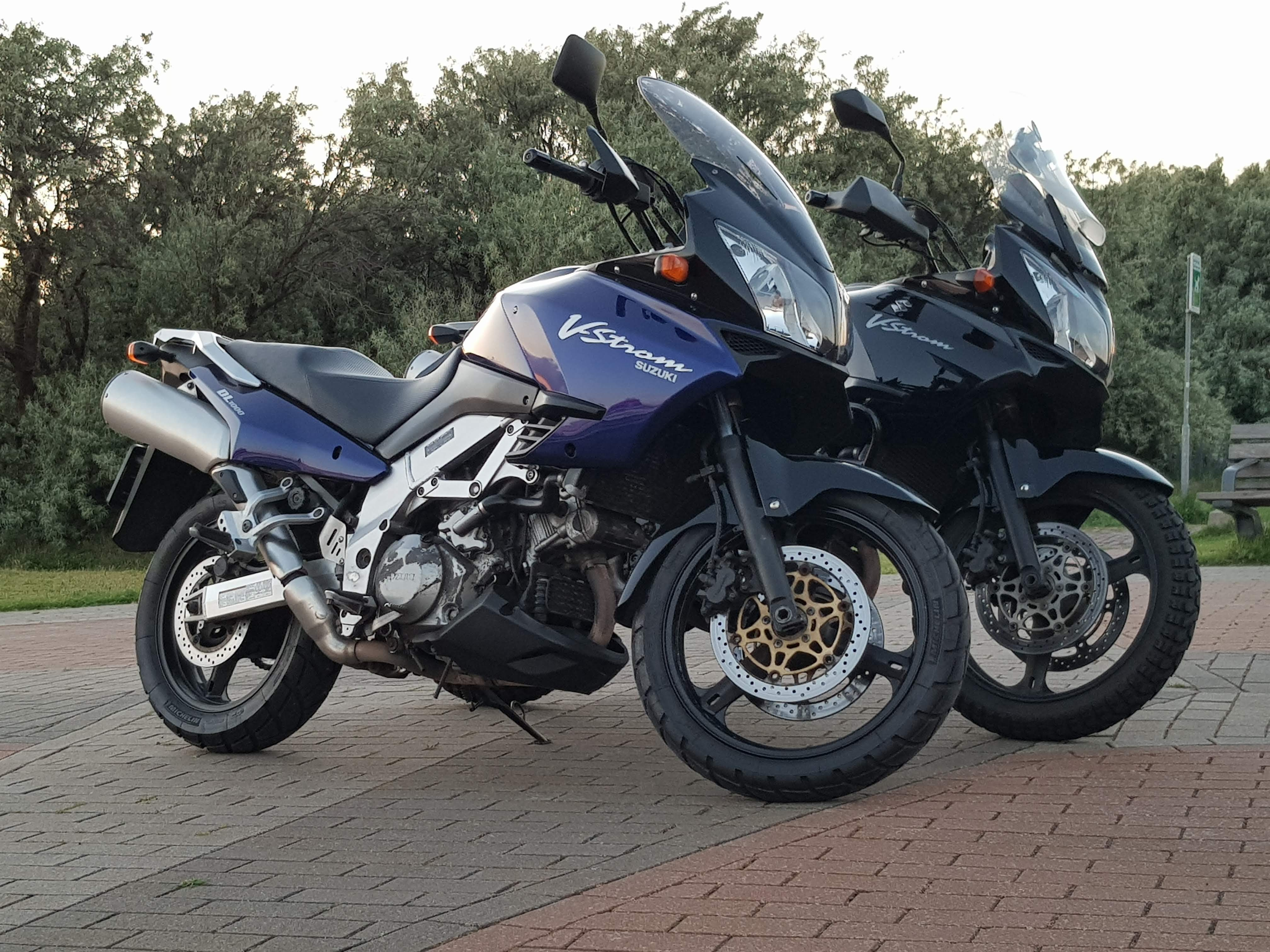
- Manufacturer: Suzuki
- Also called: DL1000
- Production: since 2002
- Predecessor: Suzuki DR800S
- Successor: Suzuki V-Strom 1050
- Class: Sport touring Adventure touring
- Engine: 996 cc (60.8 cu in) liquid-cooled 4-stroke 8-valve DOHC 90° V-twin
- Bore / stroke: 98 mm × 66 mm (3.9 in × 2.6 in)
- Transmission: 6-speed, constant mesh, final drive chain
- Wheelbase: 1,535 mm (60.4 in)
- Dimensions: L: 2,295 mm (90.4 in); W: 910 mm (36 in); H: 1,395 mm (54.9 in)
- Seat height: 840 mm (33 in)
- Weight: 207 kg (456 lb) (dry); 236 kg (520 lb) (wet)
- Fuel capacity: 22 L (4.8 imp gal; 5.8 US gal)
- Related: Suzuki V-Strom 650; Suzuki V-Strom 250; Suzuki V-Strom 1050

The Suzuki V-Strom 1000, also known as the DL1000, is a Japanese Sports touring or Adventure touring motorcycle, with a 996 cc V-twin engine and a standard riding posture. It has been manufactured in Japan by Suzuki since 2002, although sales in Europe ended in 2009. The name V-Strom combines "V" referring to the bike's engine configuration with the German Strom, meaning stream or power.

The V-Strom motorcycle is based on the V-twin engine initially designed for the Suzuki TL1000S and TL1000R motorcycles. It incorporates design elements from other Suzuki motorcycles including fuel injection based on the GSX-R models. A smaller-engined version, V-Strom 650 is also manufactured.

Since 2020, Suzuki has started manufacturing the replacement for the DL1000, the Suzuki V-Strom 1050 and V-Strom 1050XT. Suzuki has completely redesigned the motorcycle, though the engine remained mainly the same, except for some changes to comply to Euro5 emission standards.

Kawasaki marketed an identical version of the bike named the KLV1000 in Europe.

== Model year changes ==
2003 (K3) Added fork pre-load adjusters. Alternator output increased from 350 watts to 400 watts. New clutch slave cylinder dust cover, later production models.

2004 (K4) Redesigned instrument cluster. Upgrade 16-bit to 32-bit ECU, some sensors changed. New turn signals, 20 watt without reflector compared with earlier 10 watt. Belly pan redesigned. Stronger hand guards attached to end of handlebar. New adjustable windscreen design. Left handlebar switch incorporates flash-to-pass & emergency blinkers (EU models already had this). Stronger handlebars. Revised mirrors for less mirror breakage.

2005 (K5) Silver frame revised to black frame. Black rear frame covers vs previously fairing colour. New quiet clutch cover. Headlight interrupt when starting.

2007 (K7) New clear turn signal lenses and new swingarm pivot covers.

2013 (L3) Suzuki is introducing a 2014 model V-Strom 1000, based on the popular, and strong selling adventure bike category. A "Concept" bike was on display during the September 2012 Intermot Motorcycle Show.
