= Touring motorcycle =

Type of motorcycle

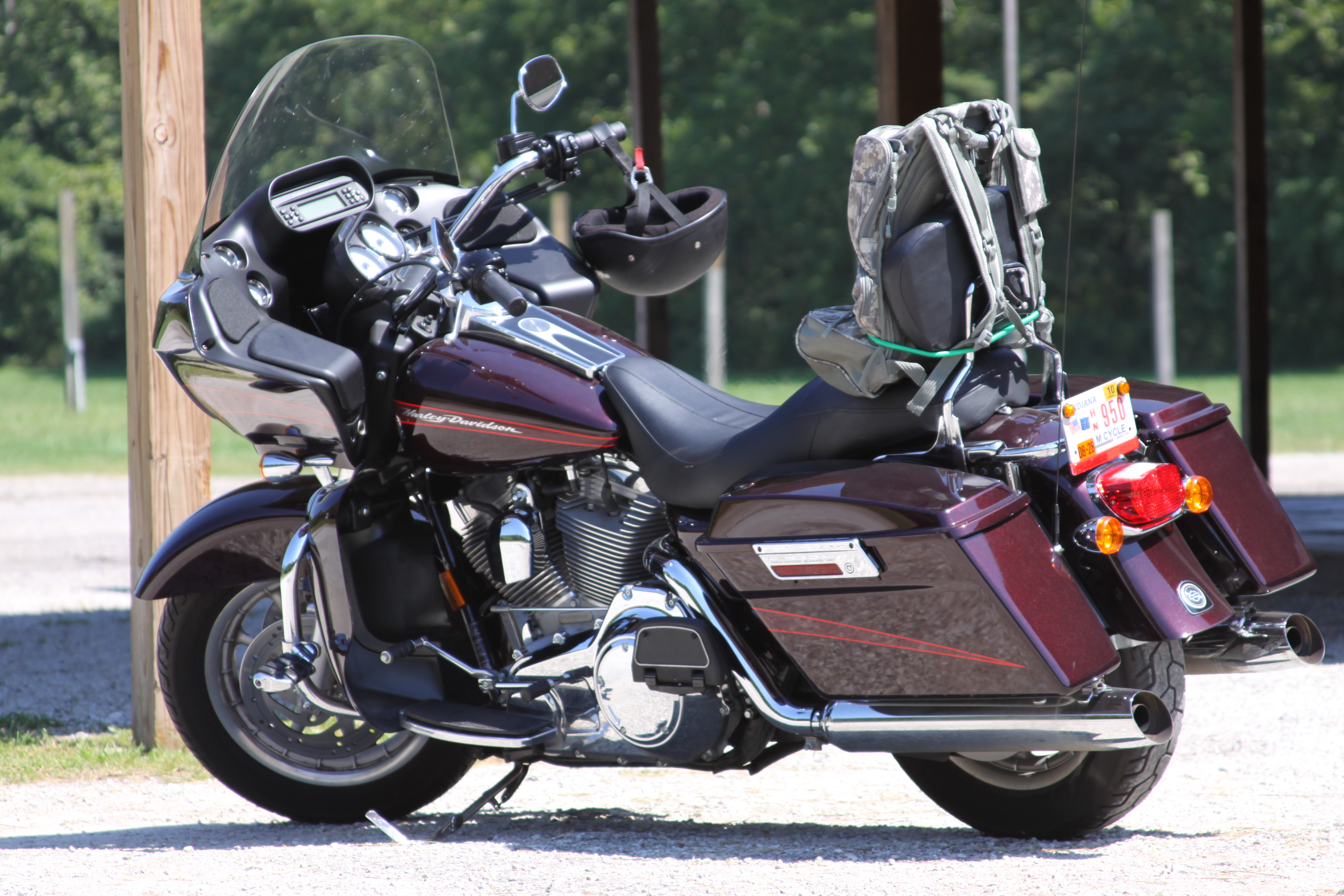
Harley-Davidson Road Glide touring motorcycle.

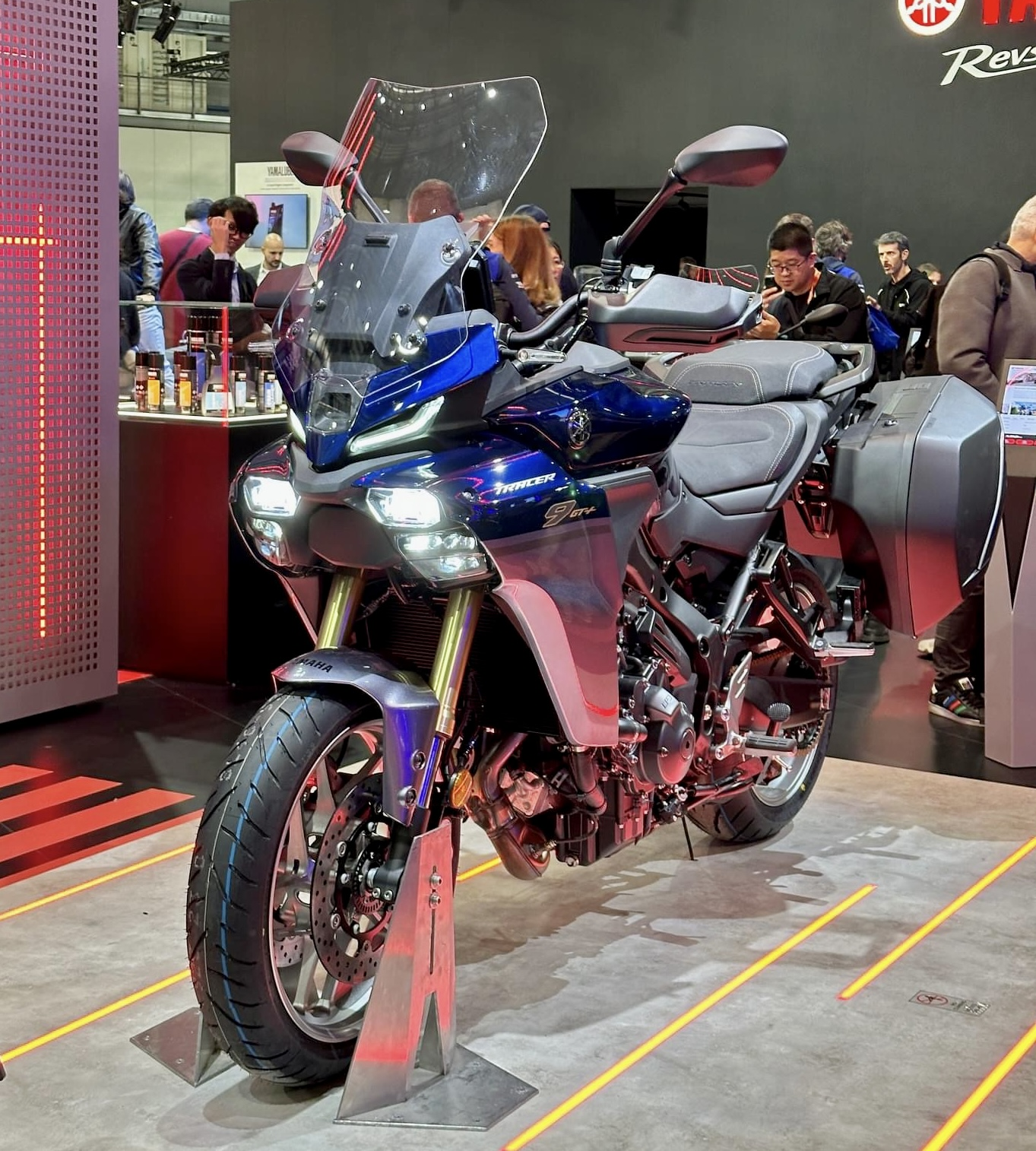
Yamaha Tracer 9 GT+ with panniers

A touring motorcycle is a type of motorcycle designed for touring. Although almost any motorcycle can be used for this purpose, manufacturers have developed specific models designed to address the particular needs of these riders. Touring motorcycles commonly have large displacement fairings and windshields that offer a high degree of weather and wind protection, large-capacity fuel tanks for long-distance riding, engines with a great deal of low-end horsepower, and a more relaxed, upright seating position than sport bikes.

Particularly in the US, touring motorcycles may be given names such as bagger, full bagger, full dresser, full dress tourer, or dresser. These monikers (often used disparagingly or jocularly) originally applied to cruisers with full sets of saddlebags or panniers such as Harley-Davidsons; but these terms may now refer to any touring motorcycle.

== Full-dress tourers ==
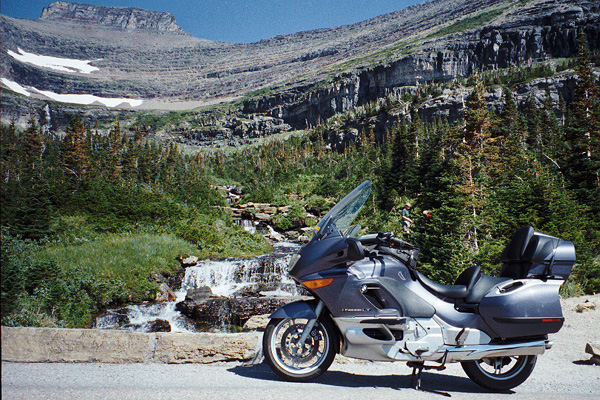
BMW K 1200 LT at Glacier National Park

Full-dress touring motorcycles are generally characterized by extremely large fairings and ample bodywork compared to other types of tourers. Hard luggage, e.g. panniers and a top box, are integrated into the design of the motorcycle which usually has a very large displacement, torquey engine with a very upright, comfortable riding position.

Additionally, optional amenities for full-dress tourers might include equipment not normally offered on other motorcycles such as complete stereos (AM/FM radios with CD players or MP3 connections), satellite radio, heated seats and hand-grips, GPS navigation systems, custom windshields, integrated air compressors, and air bags. Beyond what manufacturers supply, 'full dressers' are often customized by owners with additional accessories.

Full-dress tourers are designed specifically for riding on pavement. A few examples of full-dress tourers are the Yamaha Royal Star Venture, the Honda Gold Wing, and Harley-Davidson Electra Glide.

== Adventure tourers ==
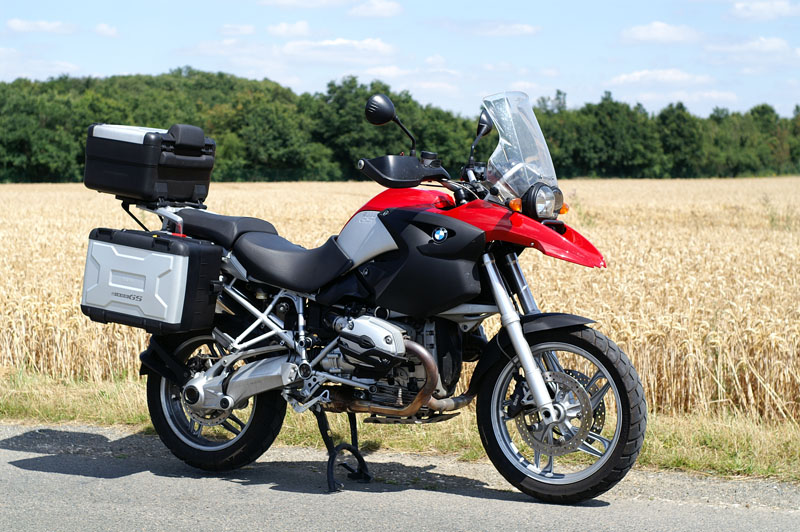
BMW R1200GS adventure touring motorcycle

A recent type, the adventure touring motorcycle is a dual-sport motorcycle that allows long-range touring with on-road and off-road capabilities. Adventure tourers have high ground clearance (for off-road purposes), large fuel capacity, and under-stressed engines for high reliability. They may have rugged GPS navigation systems, wire-spoked wheels with road-legal knobby tyres (high end models may have tubeless tyres to increase high speed safety), skid plates (to protect the engine and transmission during off-road use), and tough metal panniers. Modified adventure tourers are sometimes used in gruelling rally events, such as the Dakar Rally. Adventure tourer models include the BMW R1200GS, the KTM 990 Adventure series, Suzuki V-Strom 1000, and many others. Although most modern adventure tourers are large capacity bikes, that has not always been so: the first rider to win the Dakar Rally did so on a Yamaha XT500.

== Sport tourers ==
Sport tourers are a hybrid form of motorcycle of the sport bike and tourer. Forming a niche market, sport tourers combine the performance of a sport bike with the long-distance capabilities and comfort of a touring motorcycle. They exhibit much greater emphasis on sporting performance (in both handling and speed) than conventional tourers. Although Honda has three sport touring models, and BMW has four, most motorcycle manufacturers tend to have a single sport tourer, such as the Triumph Sprint ST or Yamaha FJR1300. Sport tourers may have hard luggage as a standard fitment or as an optional extra.

== See also ==
- Lists of models:
  - Category:Touring motorcycles
  - Category:Sport touring motorcycles
- Outline of motorcycles and motorcycling
