= Suzuki TL1000R =

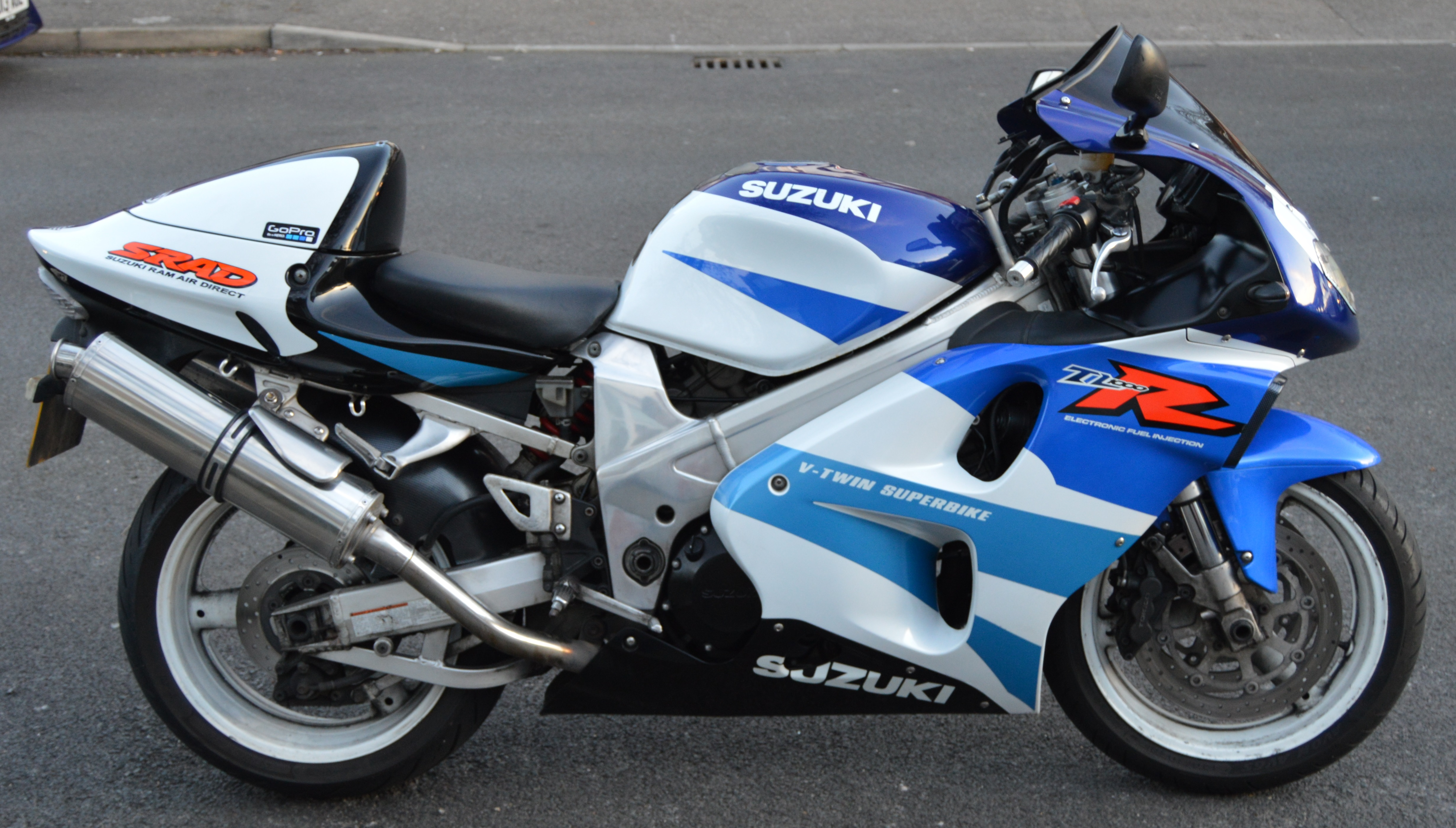
- Manufacturer: Suzuki
- Production: 1998–2003
- Successor: Suzuki SV1000S
- Class: Sport bike
- Engine: water-cooled DOHC 996 cc 90° V-twin four stroke
- Transmission: 6-speed, chain
- Rake, trail: 23 degrees, 3.6 in (90.6 mm)
- Wheelbase: 54.9 in
- Dimensions: L: 82.6 in W: 29.1 in
- Seat height: 32.5 in (825 mm)
- Weight: 434 lb (197 kg) (dry)
- Fuel capacity: 4.50 US Gallons (with a 1.2 gallon reserve)
- Related: Suzuki TL1000S

The Suzuki TL1000R motorcycle was introduced in 1998 as Suzuki's 90° V-Twin Superbike. Production ended in 2003.

== General background ==
The TL1000R is a full fairing racing-oriented version of Suzuki's popular TL1000S. The TL1000R was launched in 1998, one year after its sibling, the TL1000S. Unlike the TL-S, the TL-R was designed to compete in the World and American Superbike Championships, although it achieved only one race win before Suzuki pulled the plug on the TL racing program, in favor of returning to the lighter GSX-R750 as its Superbike entry. The TL-R took aim at Ducati's 916 both in the Superbike Championship and in consumer sales. The R shares basic engine architecture with the S but has special components including forged pistons, stronger connecting rods, and a much stiffer frame while retaining the motors 90° V-twin for perfect primary balance and had hybrid chain/gear driven cams. A traditional cam chain turned a gear that in turn rotated the cams. This hybrid design eased maintenance immensely and gave the motor additional aural character because of the gear whine. The engine tweaks given to the TL-R made it known for its very good top-end horsepower (as compared to most V-twins that make better bottom end power). The TL-R was offered in yellow, blue/white, black, and red. Suzuki stopped production of the TL1000S in 2001, and the TL1000R in 2003.

== Specifications ==
All specifications are manufacturer claimed.

Engine	996 cc, 4-stroke, V-twin, liquid-cooled, DOHC, 8-valve
Bore/Stroke	98.0 mm x 66.0 mm
Compression Ratio	11.7:1
Max Power	135 bhp (101 kW) at 9500 rpm
Max Torque	78 ft·lbs at 7500 rpm
Fuel System	Fuel Injection/Carbed
Lubrication	Wet Sump
Ignition	Computer Controlled Digital Electronic
Transmission	6-speed, constant mesh
Final Drive	#530 chain (17 Front-39 Rear)
Overall Length	82.6 in
Overall Width	29.1 in
Seat Height	32.5 in (825 mm)
Wheelbase	54.9 in
Dry Weight	424 lb (192 kg)
Suspension Front	43 mm inverted forks with spring preload, rebound and compression damping
Suspension Rear	Progressive linkage with adjustable damper, rear spring in isolation with adjustable preload
Brakes Front	Twin 320 mm discs with six-piston calipers
Brakes Rear	Single 220 mm disc with dual piston caliper
Tires Front	120/70-ZR17
Tires Rear	190/50-ZR17
Fuel Tank Capacity	4.5 US gallons (with a 1.2 gallon reserve) (17 L, 4.5 L reserve)

== See also ==
- Suzuki SV1000
- Suzuki TL1000S
