= Suzuki V-Strom 650 =

Japanese sport/adventure touring motorcycle

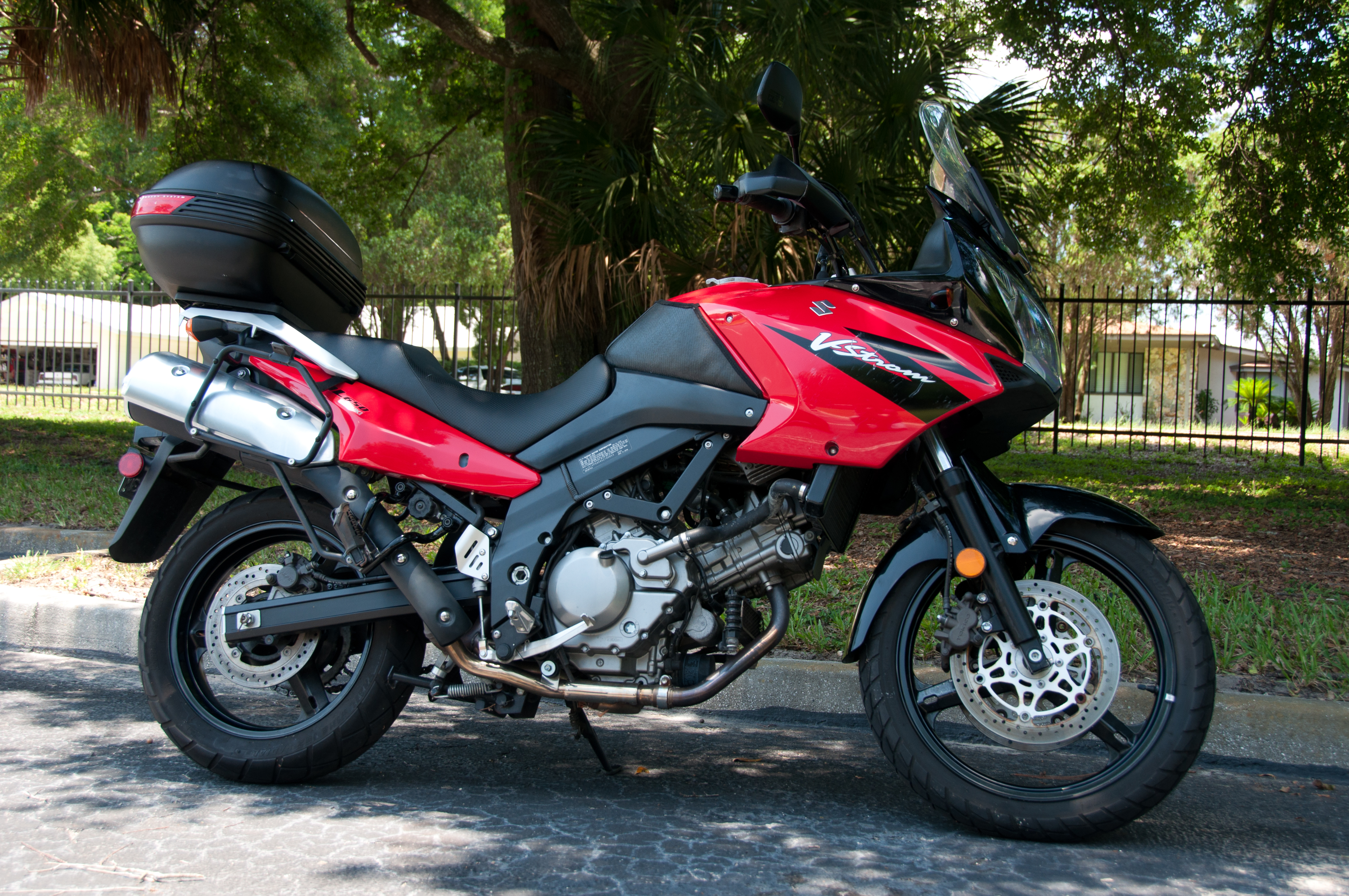
- 2005 V-Strom 650
- Manufacturer: Suzuki
- Production: Since 2004
- Class: Sport-touring/adventure-touring
- Engine: 645 cc (39.4 cu in) four-stroke liquid-cooled 8V DOHC 90° V-twin
- Bore / stroke: 81.0 mm × 62.6 mm (3.19 in × 2.46 in)
- Compression ratio: 11.2:1
- Power: 66 bhp (49 kW) at 8,800 rpm
- Torque: 60.3 N⋅m (44.5 lbf⋅ft) at 6,400 rpm
- Transmission: 6-speed, chain
- Tires: F: 110/80-19; R: 150/70-17
- Wheelbase: 1,555 mm (61.2 in)
- Dimensions: L: 2,290 mm (90 in); W: 840 mm (33 in); H: 1,390 mm (55 in) (screen in low position)
- Seat height: 820 mm (32 in)
- Weight: 470 lb (210 kg) (wet)
- Fuel capacity: 22 L (4.8 imp gal; 5.8 US gal)
- Related: V-Strom 1000, Suzuki V-Strom 1050, Suzuki V-Strom 250

The Suzuki V-Strom 650 (DL650, nicknamed Wee-strom) is a mid-weight, adventure touring motorcycle made by Suzuki since 2004, in its third generation since model year 2017. It has a standard riding posture, fuel injection and an aluminum chassis. Marketed in Europe, Oceania, the Americas, and since 2018, India, the DL650 is manufactured at Suzuki's final assembly plant in Toyokawa, Japan. The V-Strom 650 trades strength in a single area for adaptability to a variety of riding conditions: commuting, cruising, adventure touring, and to a lesser degree, off-road riding. The bike is variously categorized as dual sport, sport enduro tourer, street/adventure, commuter, or entry-level.

According to the New York Times, the V-Strom has a loyal following worldwide, and the DL650 outsells the larger Suzuki V-Strom 1000 and the Suzuki V-Strom 1050 and the smaller Suzuki V-Strom 250.

The name V-Strom combines V, referring to the bike's V engine configuration, with the German word Strom, meaning stream or current.

== Mechanicals ==
The V-Strom has a six-speed transmission with a fuel-injected and slightly retuned 645 cc engine from Suzuki's SV650 sport bike, using a two-into-one exhaust system. An upright, standard riding posture contributes to the bike's handling characteristics.

=== Engine ===
The engine is a 90°, liquid cooled, four-stroke V-twin, with 81.0 mm (3.19 in) bore and a 62.6 mm (2.46 in) stroke, four valves per cylinder, and intake and exhaust valving each with their own camshaft. Its more relaxed cam profiles, compared with the SV engine, boost the power between 4,000 and 6,500 rpm, along with slight changes to the airbox and exhaust. Relative to the SV, the crank inertia (flywheel effect) is also increased by 4% via a redesigned starter clutch. As well, the DL650 engine uses a plastic outer clutch cover and engine sprocket cover for reduced weight and noise.

Unlike the SV engine, which uses cast iron cylinder sleeves, the DL650 uses Suzuki's proprietary SCEM (Suzuki Composite Electro-chemical Material) plated cylinders, a race-proven nickel-phosphorus-silicon-carbide coating for reduced weight and improved heat transfer, allowing for tighter and more efficient piston-to-cylinder clearance, similar to a Nikasil coating.

=== Engine electronics ===
The DL650 engine electronics aid starting and throttle control and uses Suzuki's AFIS (Auto Fast Idle System), eliminating a fast-idle control. The engine control module (ECM) reads engine information, such as coolant temperature, via a 32-bit central processing unit (CPU), controlling the fuel system's dual throttle bodies.

=== Emissions ===
The DL650 uses Suzuki Dual Throttle Valve (SDTV) fuel-injection and exhausts via a two-into-one exhaust system with a catalytic converter in the muffler. European models meet Euro 3 emissions specifications. In the US, a "PAIR" air injection system reduces CO and HC emissions.

=== Chassis ===
A stiff, twin-spar aluminum frame and swingarm accommodates a rear Showa mono-shock with rebound and hydraulic preload adjustment. Front Showa damper-rod forks are not adjustable. The DL650 has a 19-inch front wheel and a 17-inch rear wheel.

=== Instruments and bodywork ===
The bike's instrument cluster includes a compact analog step-motor speedometer and tachometer (both with LED illumination) and a digital LCD unit with odometer, trip meter, coolant temperature gauge, fuel gauge, LED neutral, digital clock, turn signal and high beam lights and an oil pressure warning light.

An adjustable windshield allows movement of 50 mm (2.0 in). A small underseat compartment, suitable for small tools, gloves, or an owner's manual, can be accessed by removal of the seat, via a lock located at the rear of the bike, just below the built-in rack.

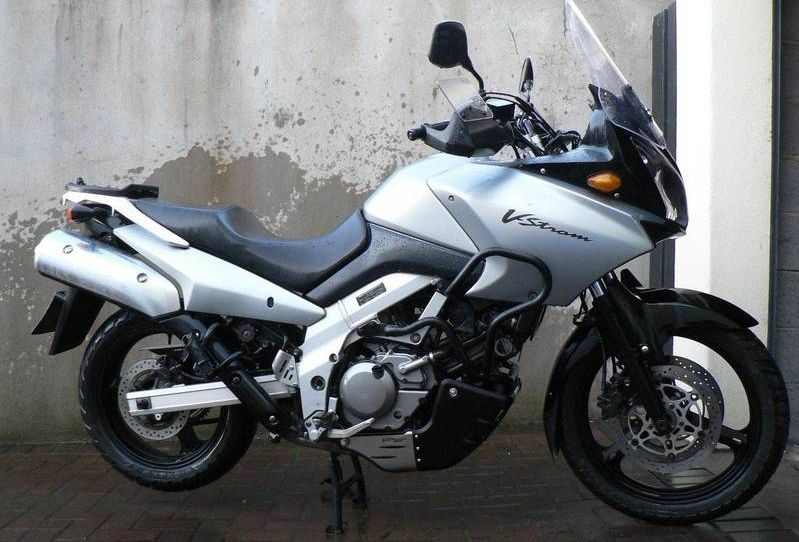
European model 2004 DL650

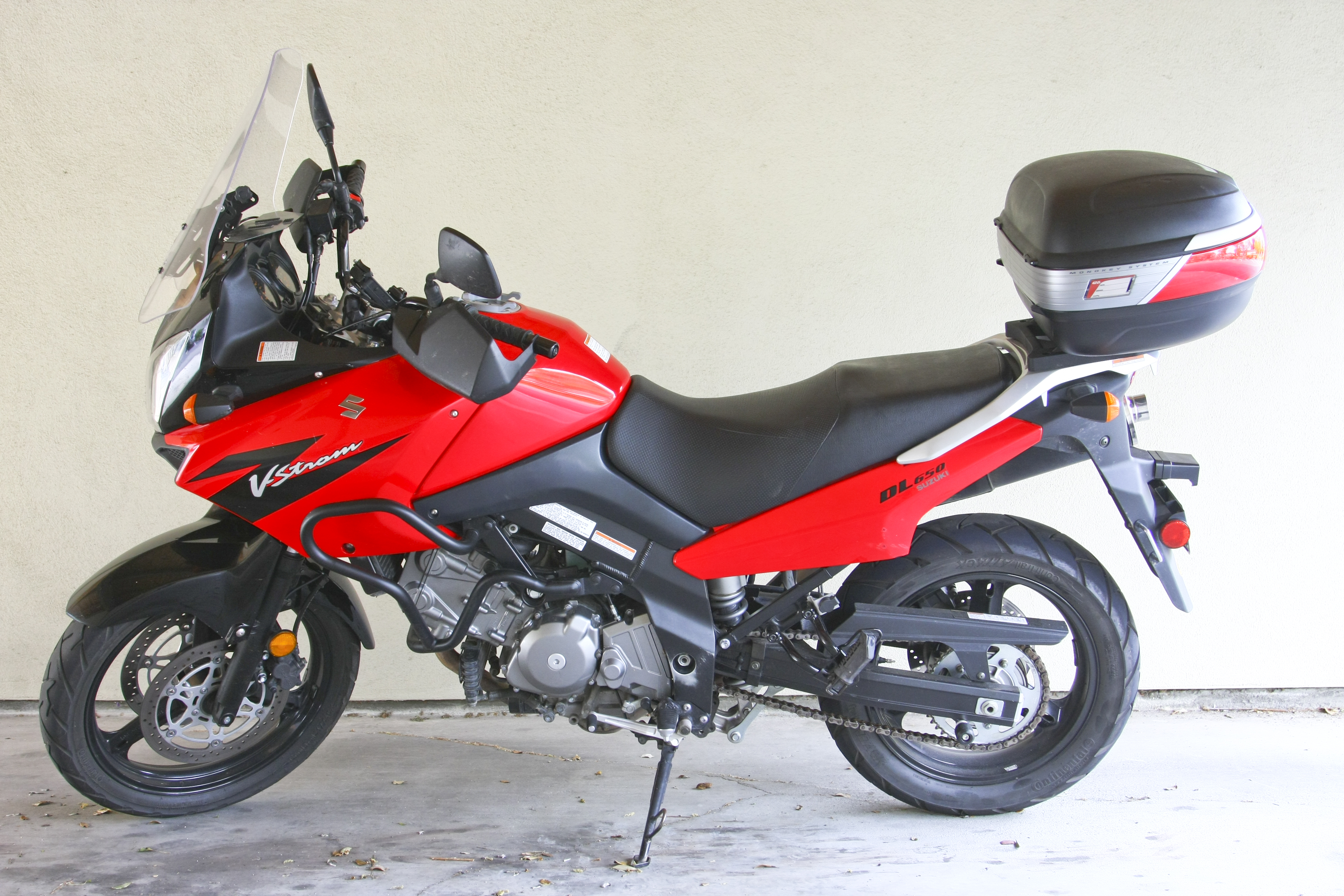
US Model 2005 DL650, with aftermarket windshield and bracket, hand guards, Givi crash guards, Suzuki tall seat, and top case

== Awards and reviews ==
The V-Strom 650, also known as the "DL650", was named one of the "ten best" bikes under $10,000 by Motorcyclist (USA) magazine, October, 2007—beating out, among many others, the V-Strom 1000. In a September 2006 article, Cycle World magazine wrote "the DL650 may just be the most shockingly competent machine in the world today." A 2004 article from MotorcycleUSA.com said "it was hard to imagine another machine with a competitive versatility-per-dollar ratio." Twice consecutively, the DL650 has earned the title "Alpenkoenig" (King of the Alps), winning German Motorrad magazine's trans-alp multi-bike test in 2005 and 2006.

At the DL650's launch, Kevin Ash said "taking everything into account - price, comfort, fuel range, general ability, you could argue it was the bike of the year," adding, "there's something honest and solid about the V-Strom." Having ridden a DL650 as his daily rider, in 2005 Ash called it the "best bike you can buy." Ash complimented the bike's comfort, fuel range, engine and handling, faulting its brakes and corrosion resistance, and described the bike as "perhaps the ultimate all-round machine." At the launch of the revised 2012 model, Ash said that the previous generation, which could be very vulnerable to corrosion, had "been left behind, especially by direct rival, the Kawasaki Versys." After the release of the 2012 model, Ash placed the Vstrom ahead of the Versys.

== First generation ==
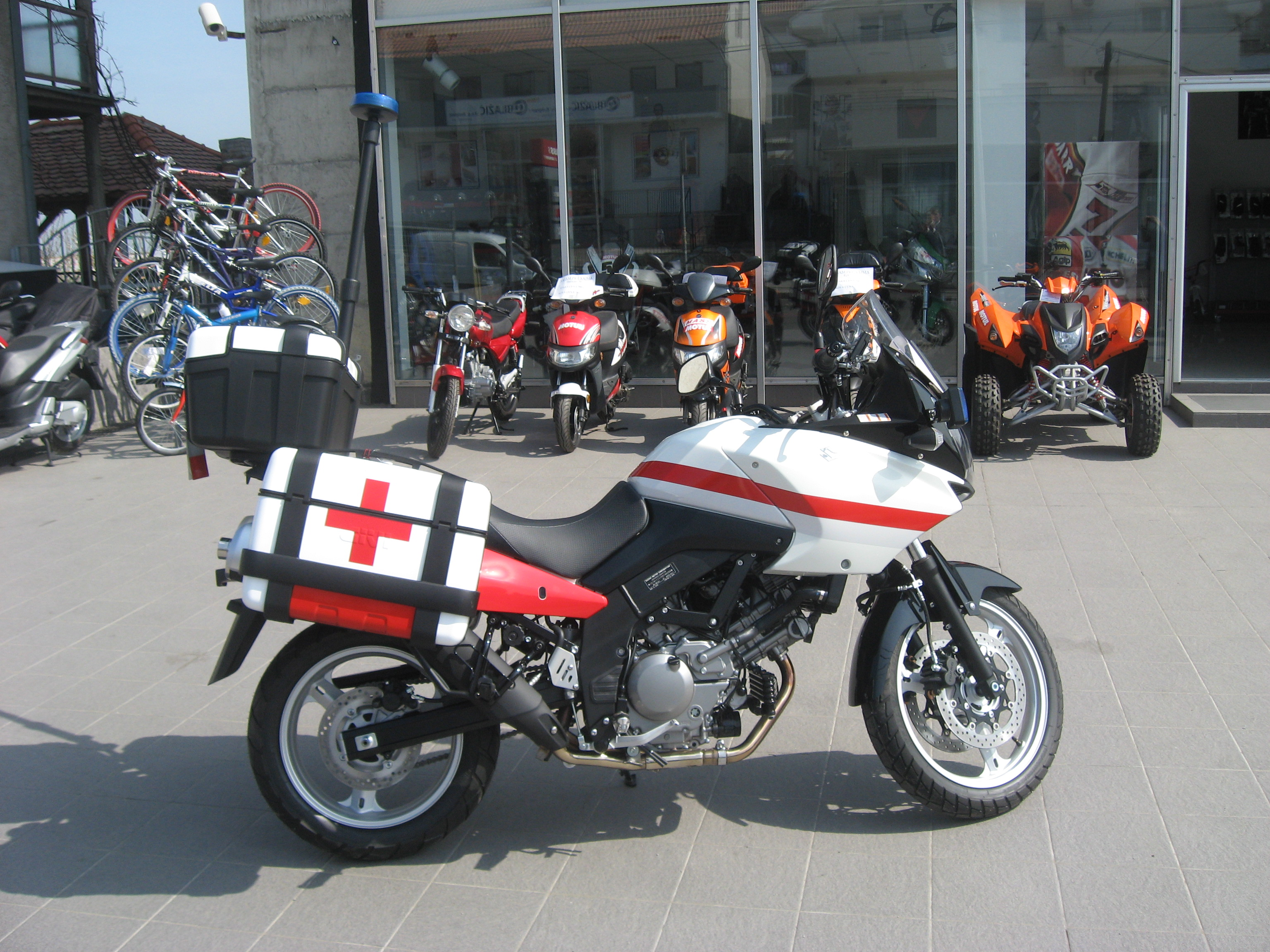
Paramedic version of the Suzuki V-strom, 650 in Serbia

=== 2004 ===
- First model year

=== 2005 ===
- Headlight interrupt when starting added.
- Only 100 special edition units were created that included several unique accessories and was notable for having a tire mark painted on the fairing.

=== 2007 ===
- Optional ABS (Anti-lock braking system)
- Wheelbase increased from 1,540 to 1,550 mm (60.6 to 61.2 in) with an increase in the swingarm length by 15.2 mm (.597 in)
- Dual sparkplugs at each cylinder. (Excluding European Models)
- Idle adjustment screw removed

=== 2008 ===
- Alternator output increased from 375 to 400 watts.

=== 2009 ===
- All-steel locknut on rear axle, previously castellated nut style. (US Model only, this feature always present on Australia and New Zealand Models)
- Clear signal light lenses, previously amber.

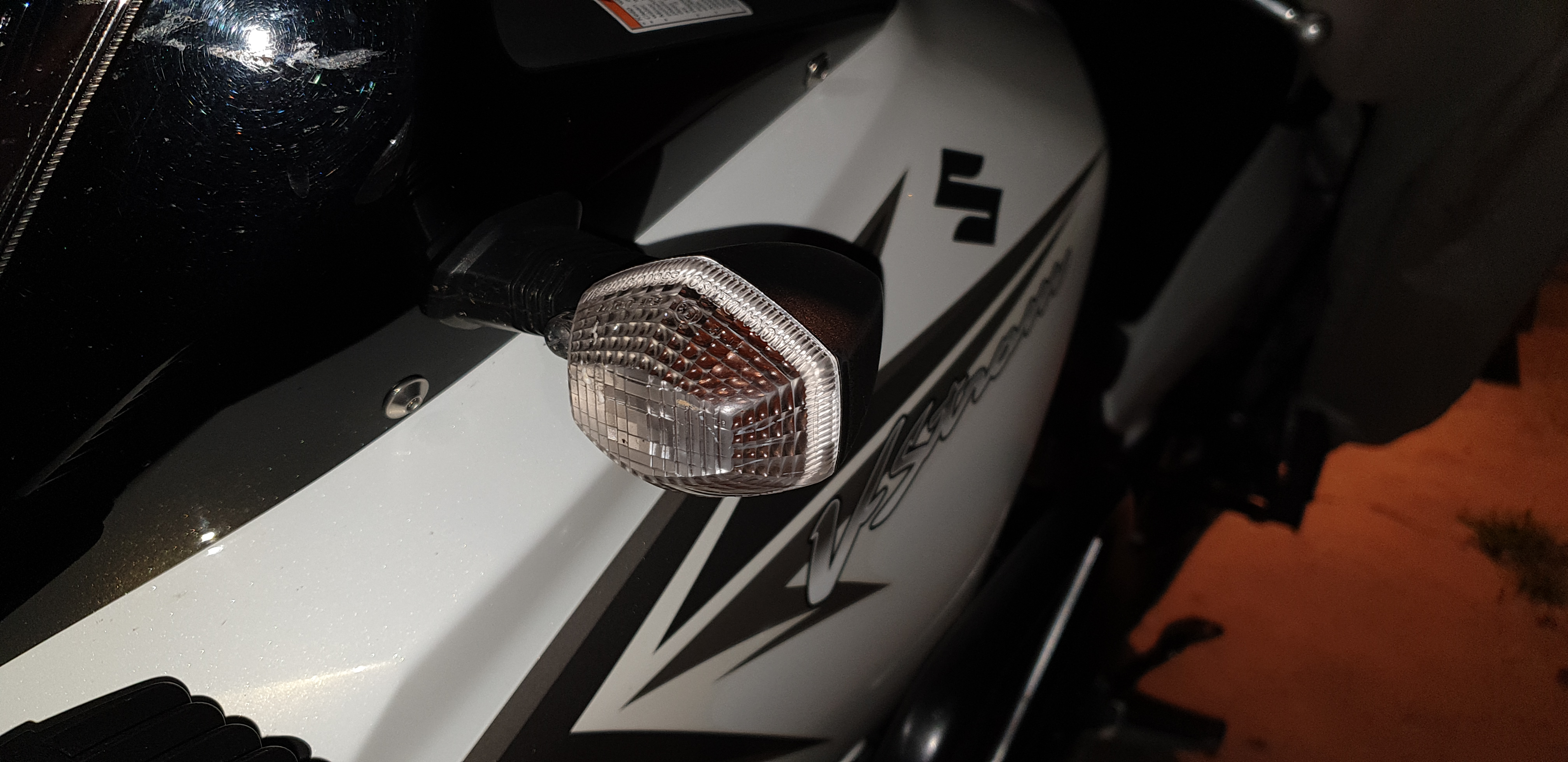
DL650 K9 (2009) Clear indicator lenses

=== 2010 ===
- No 2010 models in US.

=== 2011 ===
- For US, all models, ABS equipped.

== Second generation ==
=== 2012 ===
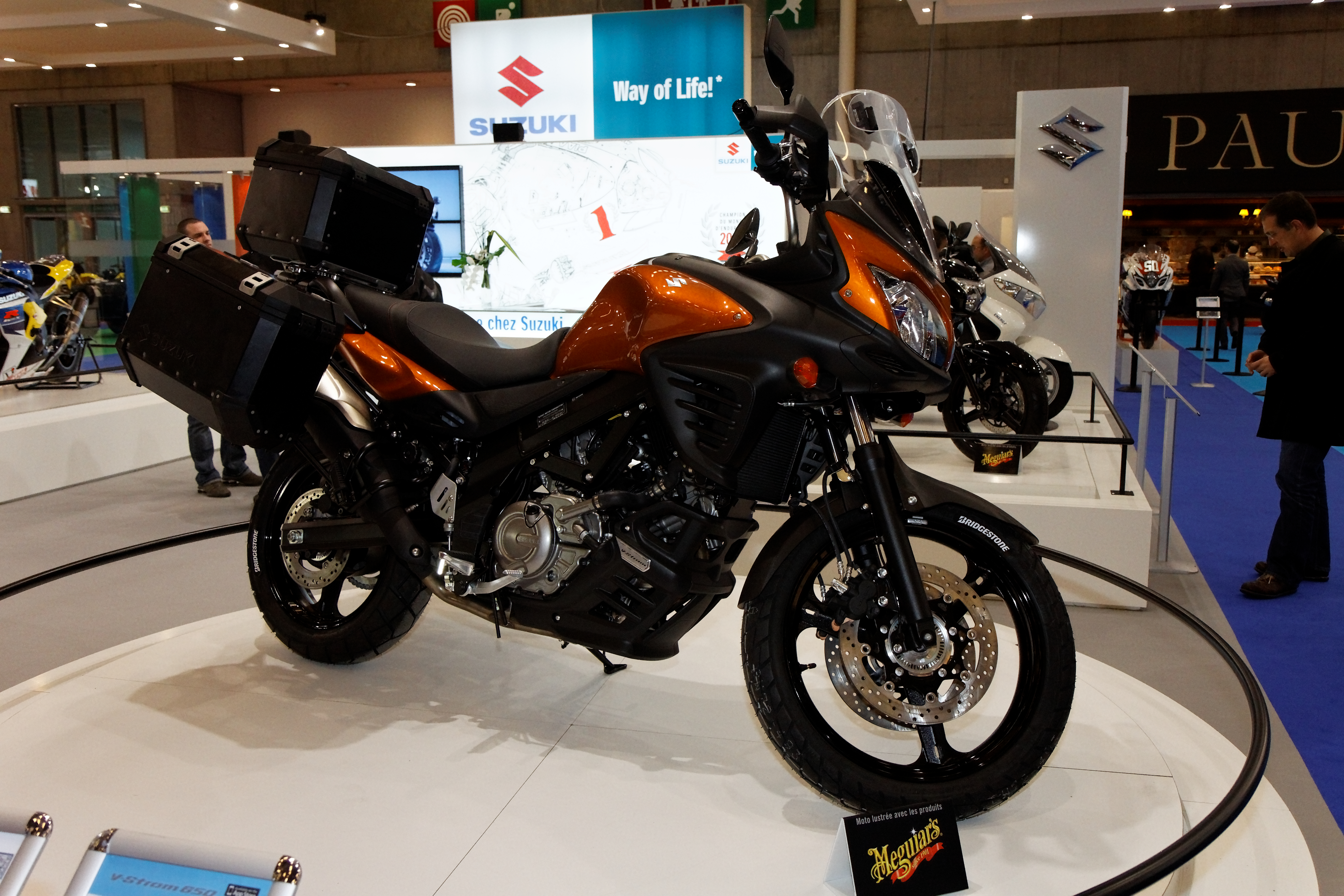
2012 VStrom

The 2012 model had minor changes in styling and some specifications, including fuel capacity reduced from 22 to 20 L (4.8 to 4.4 imp gal; 5.8 to 5.3 US gal), seat height raised from 820 to 835 mm (32.3 to 32.9 in), and 10 mm more rear suspension travel.

The instrument cluster changed significantly. The analog style speedometer was changed to a digital readout along with a larger digital display including dual trip odometers, clock, temp gauge, mileage and air temp. The analog style tachometer was retained.

The "adventure" model included hard cases by SW-MOTECH. The model also included knuckle covers and an adjustable wind deflector.

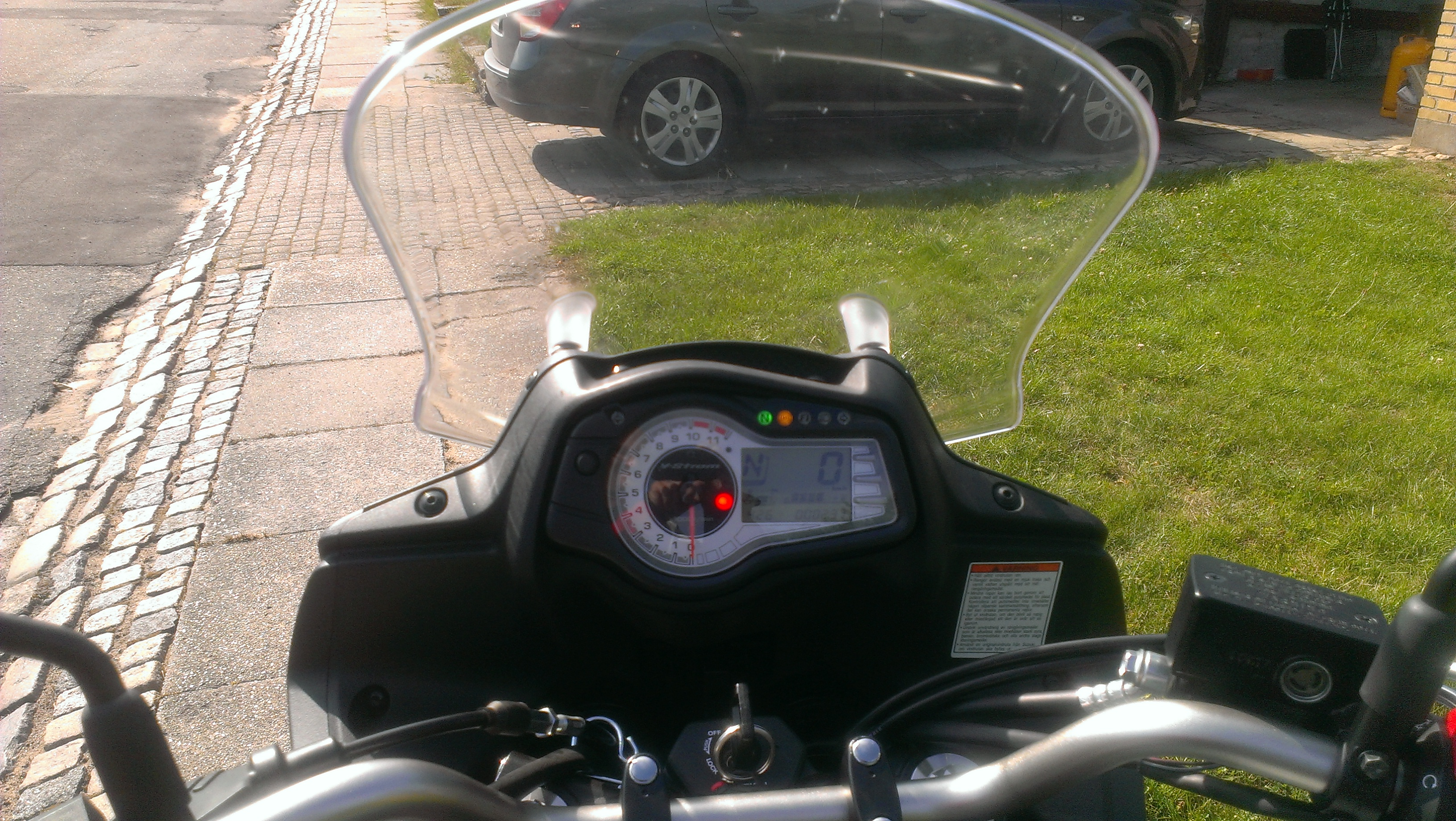
DL650AL2 instruments

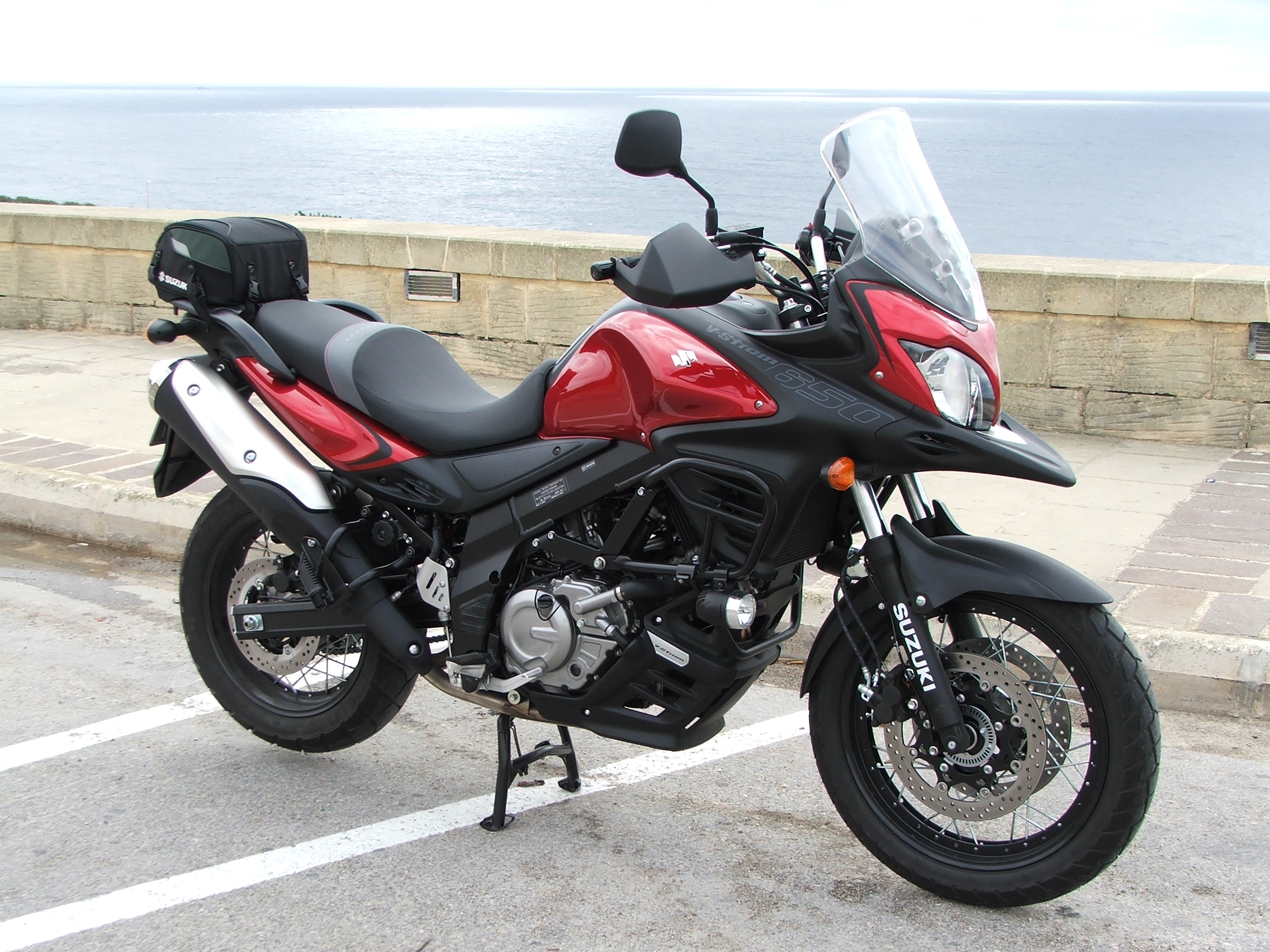
2015 Suzuki V-Strom 650XT ABS

=== 2015 XT Model ===
- Front styling included a beak-like front cowl.
- Wheels were changed to lightweight wire-spoked aluminium rims in keeping with adventure styling, but retained the tubeless feature of previous models. (Available as optional extra only in some dealers)

== Third generation ==
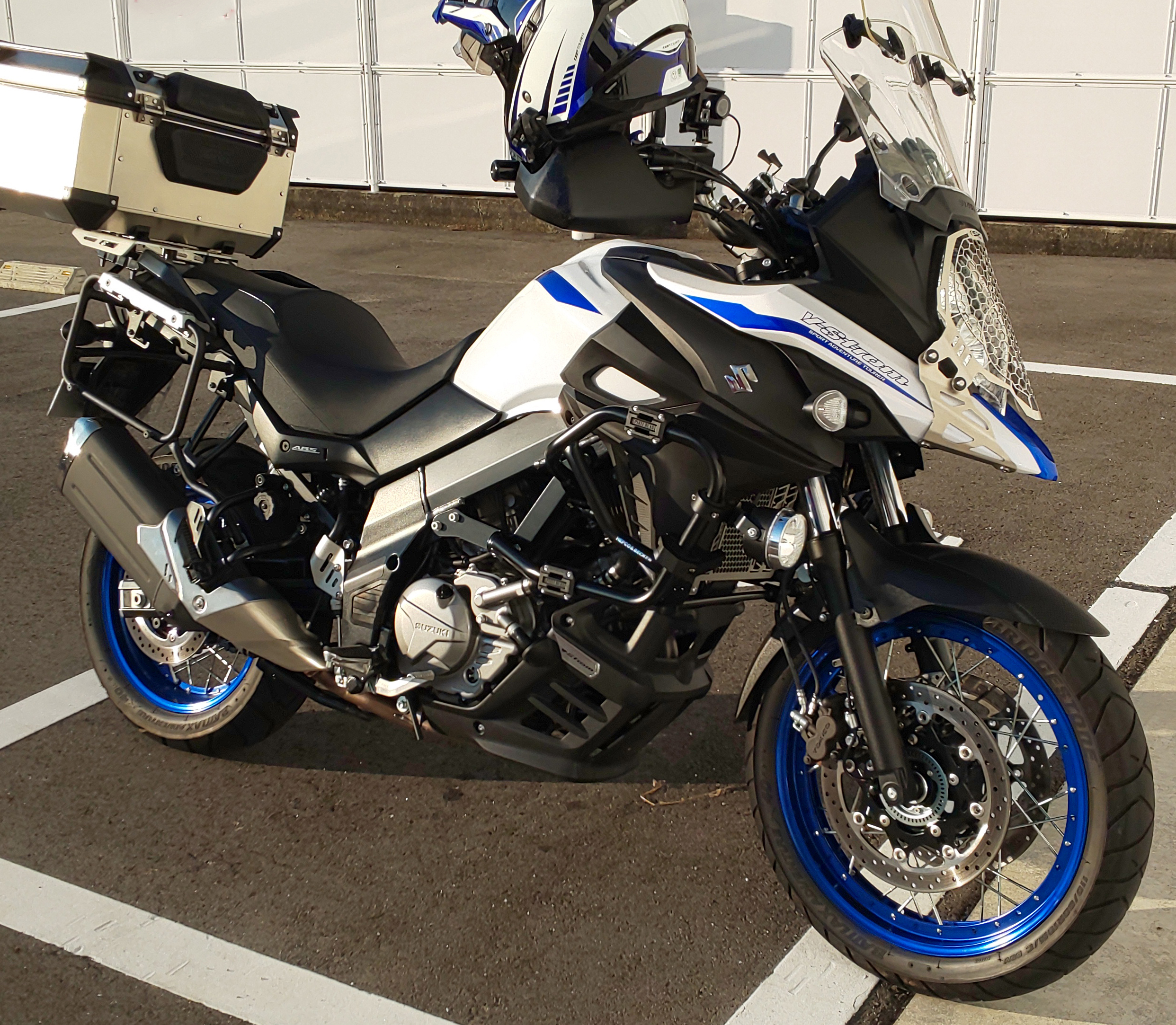
2019 V-Strom XT

Beginning in 2017 the DL650, which was also now labeled on the new and improved front beak as a "Sport Adventure Tourer", was available in two model versions; the base and XT. The base has Ten spoked cast-aluminium wheels, while the 650 XT features tubeless tire wire-spoked wheels. This version of the DL650 now has intercompatible luggage rack with the updated DL1000 from 2014. It also now features adjustable traction control and throttle assist which slowly increases the rpm of the engine when the clutch is released or riding at slow speeds. This decreases the chance the rider will stall the motorcycle. The 2017 model is also Euro4-compliant.

Unique to the V-Strom 650XT/A are the knuckle covers to support harsh condition riding, and the engine under cowling to give the rider that extra adventure feel, both as standard equipment.
