= Kawasaki A1 Samurai =

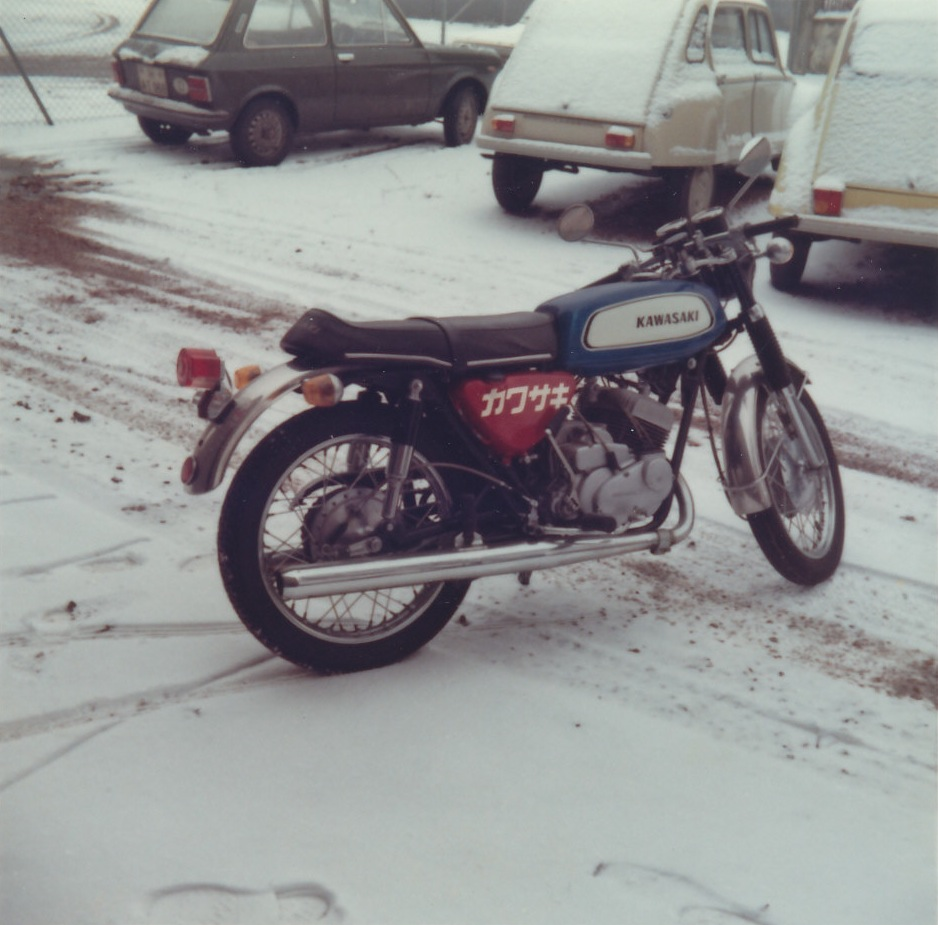
- Manufacturer: Kawasaki Motors
- Parent company: Kawasaki Heavy Industries
- Production: 1967–1971
- Successor: Kawasaki S1 Mach I
- Class: Standard
- Engine: 247 cc (15.1 cu in), air-cooled, two-stroke, 2 rotary inlet valves, parallel twin
- Bore / stroke: 53 mm × 56 mm (2.1 in × 2.2 in)
- Transmission: Chain driven 5-speed manual
- Suspension: Inner-spring telescopic front fork, shock absorber and swing arm (rear).
- Fuel capacity: 13.51 L (2.97 imp gal; 3.57 US gal)
- Related: Kawasaki A7 Avenger 350

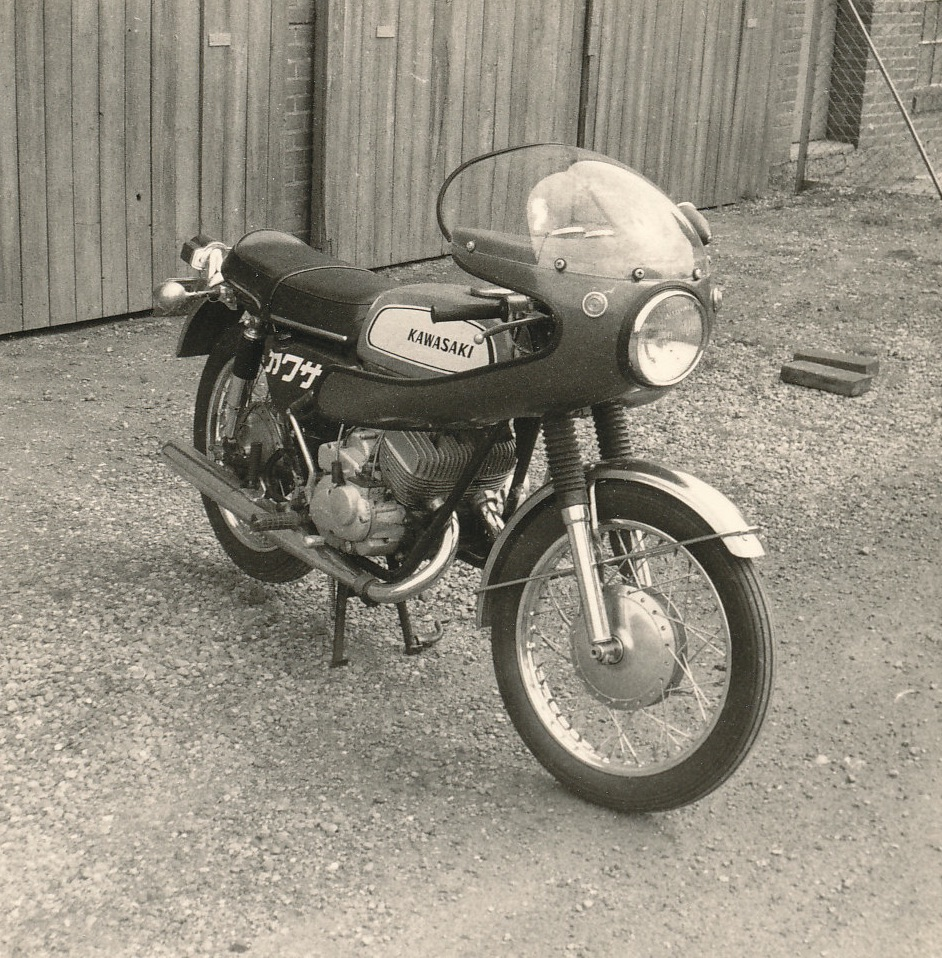
Kawasaki A 1 Samurai Umbau

The Kawasaki A1 Samurai is a 250 cc (15 cu in) standard class Kawasaki motorcycle which was sold from 1967 through 1971.

== Development ==
The Kawasaki W1 did not sell as expected, because all rival bikes were still faster, lighter and had better steering. Kawasaki developed the lighter A1 Samurai in 1967. The A1 took center stage as a high-performance machine, with approximately 80ps per liter. It was quickly followed by a larger-bore model, the Kawasaki A7 Avenger which shared most of the Samurai components except the motor.

=== A1SS ===
The A1SS Samurai has a crossover dual exhaust mounted on the left side and just below the seat. Other than exhaust system, there were no other changes between the standard A1 and A1SS.

== The engine ==
The engine was a straight twin, two-stroke, air-cooled, oil-injected, dual rotary disc valve. The engine's ignition air supply began in an air filter canister below the seat and was pulled through a large plenum chamber just above the transmission and behind the cylinder head then downward into the two internal passages leading to the carburetor housing feeding the carburetors. The A1 had two Mikuni carburetors located on the engine's left and right sides and inline with the crankshaft. The carburetors were enclosed and protected from the elements by carburetor covers fixed to the crankcase. Inboard of each carburetor, and supporting each carburetor, was the disc cover. The rotary disc valve was housed inboard of that cover. The A1 Samurai motor was lubricated by the Superlube system, with 2-stroke oil directly injected in the intake tract. Previously equipped with points, the ignition system was equipped in 1969 with a Capacitor discharge ignition including thyristor-based switching system then increased the voltage to between 25,000 and 30,000 volts reducing the unburned fuel mixture within the cylinders.

This combination of displacement (247cc), CDI system, and rotary discs produced 31 hp (23.1 KW) @ 8000 RPM gave the Samurai a power-to-weight ratio of 1 horsepower per 11 pounds of weight, a 0-60 mph of 6.6 second, making the Samurai as fast or faster than production competitors in its class.

== Appearance ==
- 1966-1967: The A1 was available with either a candy red or candy blue with chrome parts and black frame. The fuel tank had rubber knee grips, metal Kawasaki flag emblem and 2 white stripes at the bottom. Rear fender, lower rear shock absorber, chain guard, and parts of the front fork assembly were chrome. Front fender was stainless steel, a novelty then. Upper fork, headlight and speedometer combination as well as upper rear shock absorber and side-mounted oil reservoir covers were painted.
- 1968: The color scheme remained, but the fuel tank was completely painted and a "KAWASAKI" word logo positioned at the top of the tank's panels. Upper rear shock absorbers were painted black.
- 1969: The colors remained, but the fuel tank was completely painted with oval tank sides white and a large "KAWASAKI" word logo stretching along the tank.
- 1970: The Samurai's color scheme was a pearl candy red and white. The fuel tank was red with white sides enhancing the more rectangular style shared by the Kawasaki H1 Mach III. Side covers were white. The tank has a specific indentation on top.
- 1971, All Kawasaki bikes had the angular fuel tanks and fading color decal replacing the white side tank coloring. The Samurai had a white pearl color with gold/yellow/orange matrix decals. The tank is now totally flat on top.

== Competitors ==
1969-1970 contemporaries and competitors of the A1 Samurai were:

- Honda Dream CB250: 30 hp. 0–60 in 7.6 seconds.
- Suzuki T250 Hustler. 33 hp. 0-60 mph in 7.2 seconds.
- Yamaha DS6 (250) 28 hp, 0-60 mph in 6.5 seconds.

== Specifications ==
- Displacement: 247 cc.
- Bore and Stroke: 53.0 mm x 56.0 mm.
- Compression Ratio: 6.8:1
- Induction: 2x Mikuni Vm22mm carburetors, rotary disc valve.
- Ignition: Kick start.
- Transmission: 5 Speed, wet clutch, chain driven.
- Frame: Double tubular steel cradle.
- Front Suspension: Telescopic hydraulic inner spring telescopic front fork.
- Rear suspension: Three-position spring preload adjustable shock absorber and swing arm (rear).
- Front and Rear Brakes: 180mm expanding drum.

== Racing ==
A1 Samurai have and can participate in the American Historic Racing Motorcycle Association (AHRMA) competition. Kawasaki Mach III's successfully raced with Ginger Molloy aboard his "Green Meanie" finishing 2nd just behind Giacomo Agostini's MV Agusta in the 1970 500cc World Championship. Kawasaki's
