= Kawasaki A7 Avenger =

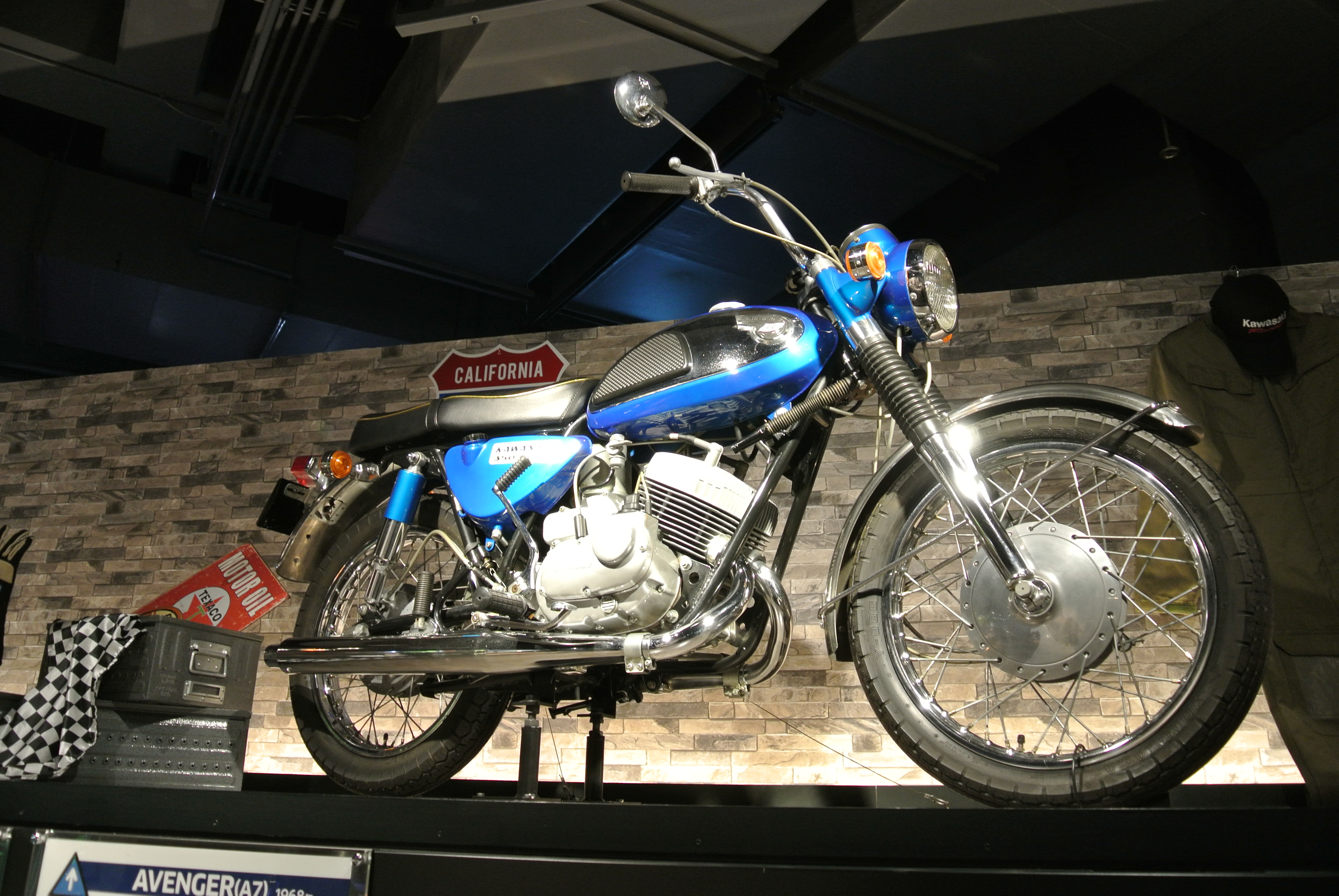
- Manufacturer: Kawasaki Motors
- Parent company: Kawasaki Heavy Industries
- Production: 1967–1971
- Successor: Kawasaki S2 Mach II
- Class: Standard
- Engine: Air-cooled parallel 2-cylinder, Two-stroke, 2 rotary inlet valves
- Top speed: 160 km/h (99 mph) to 170 km/h (105 mph)
- Power: 42 hp (30.7 kilowatts) @ 8000 RPM
- Transmission: Chain driven 5-speed
- Suspension: Inner spring telescopic front fork, shock absorber and swing arm (rear).
- Weight: N/A (dry); 158 kg (350 lb). (wet)
- Fuel capacity: 13.51 liters (3.57 gallons)
- Related: Kawasaki A1 Samurai 250

The A7 Avenger is a 350 cc (21 cu in) Kawasaki motorcycle sold 1967 through 1971.

== Development ==
Kawasaki is the last of the big four Japanese manufacturers to start making motorcycles. In 1960, it bought a share in the Meguro motorcycle company that since the 1930s had made four-stroke singles up to 500 cc and later twins up to 650 cc for the Japanese and south-east Asian markets. Since 1963, Kawasaki took complete control of Meguro, and the Meguro model K 500 cc four-stroke parallel-twin was re-badged as a Kawasaki.

The Kawasaki W1 650 cc (actually 624 cc) four-stroke twin was developed from the Meguro K series, which Meguro had developed from a BSA A7 under license.

Kawasaki developed the lighter Kawasaki A1 Samurai during 1966. It was quickly followed by the larger bore model, the A7 Avenger, which is similar to the Samurai. Sharing all of the Samurai components aside from pistons, piston rings, different mufflers with reverse cones, it also features a race-developed oiling system called Injectolube. Oil is not only injected in with the petrol as on the 250 but is also fed to the main bearings. The crankcases and crank were also redesigned for use with the Injectolube system.

The A7SS Avenger has a crossover dual exhaust mounted on the left side and just below the seat. Other than the exhaust system, there are no other changes between the standard A7 and A7SS.

== Engine ==
The engine was advanced for its time, with features normally seen on race bikes: two-cylinder, two-stroke, air-cooled, oil injected, dual rotary valve. While other manufactures had utilized the advantages of rotary disc valve induction on small single-cylinder machines, only Kawasaki and Bridgestone produced twin-cylinder machines. Rotary disc valve induction ensures that all the fuel charge is used and not partly lost (as in a piston ported engine). As a result, it produces more power, more torque at low revs and better response throughout the rev range. The engine's initial air supply begins in an air filter canister below the seat and is drawn through a large plenum chamber just above the transmission and behind the cylinder head, then down into the internal passages leading to the carburetor housing feeding the carburetors.

The A7 Avenger has two Mikuni carburetors located on the engine's left and right sides and in line with the crankshaft. The carburetors are enclosed and protected from the elements by carburetor covers fixed to the crankcase. Inboard of each carburetor, and supporting each carburetor, is the disc cover. The rotary disc valve is housed inboard of that cover. During 1969, the ignition system was equipped with a capacitor discharge ignition including thyristor-based switching system that increases the voltage to between 25,000 and 30,000 volts reducing the unburned fuel mixture within the cylinders.

During the development of the Kawasaki H1 Mach III, engineers considered using the Avenger's twin-cylinder engine bored out to create the new 500 cc two-stroke power plant as called for in the N100 Plan.

== Racing ==
A7 Avengers participate in the American Historic Racing Motorcycle Association (AHRMA) competition. Kawasaki Mach III's successfully raced with Ginger Molloy aboard his "Green Meanie" finishing 2nd just behind Giacomo Agostini's MV Agusta during the 1970 500 cc World Championship.
