= Kawasaki triple =

Kawasaki triples
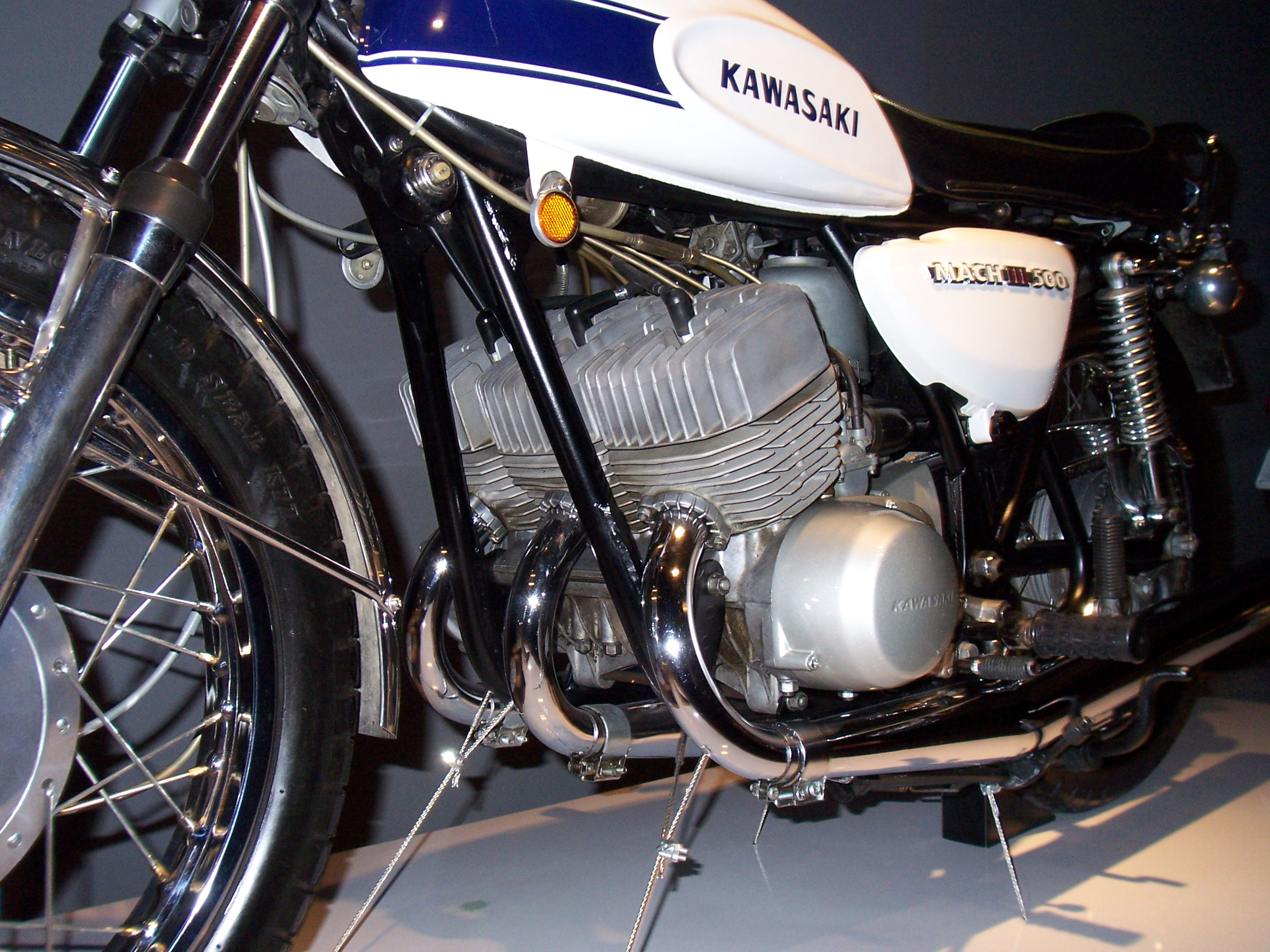
- H1 Mach III 500
- Manufacturer: Kawasaki
- Parent company: Kawasaki Heavy Industries
- Production: 1968–1980
- Engine: 250 to 750 cc (15 to 46 cu in) air-cooled piston port two-stroke triple

The Kawasaki triples were a range of 250 to 750 cc (15 to 46 cu in) motorcycles made by Kawasaki from 1968 to 1980. The engines were air-cooled, three-cylinder, piston-controlled inlet port two-strokes with two exhaust pipes exiting on the right side of the bike, and one on the left. It was the first production street motorcycle with capacitor discharge ignition (CDI). Right from the first triple model, the 1968 Mach III H1 500 cc, it was a sales success that gained a reputation for almost unmatched acceleration as well as an air of danger for inexperienced riders trying to cope with the bike's increased power to weight ratio over any previously available stock motorcycles.

== Mach III H1 500 ==
Mach III H1 500
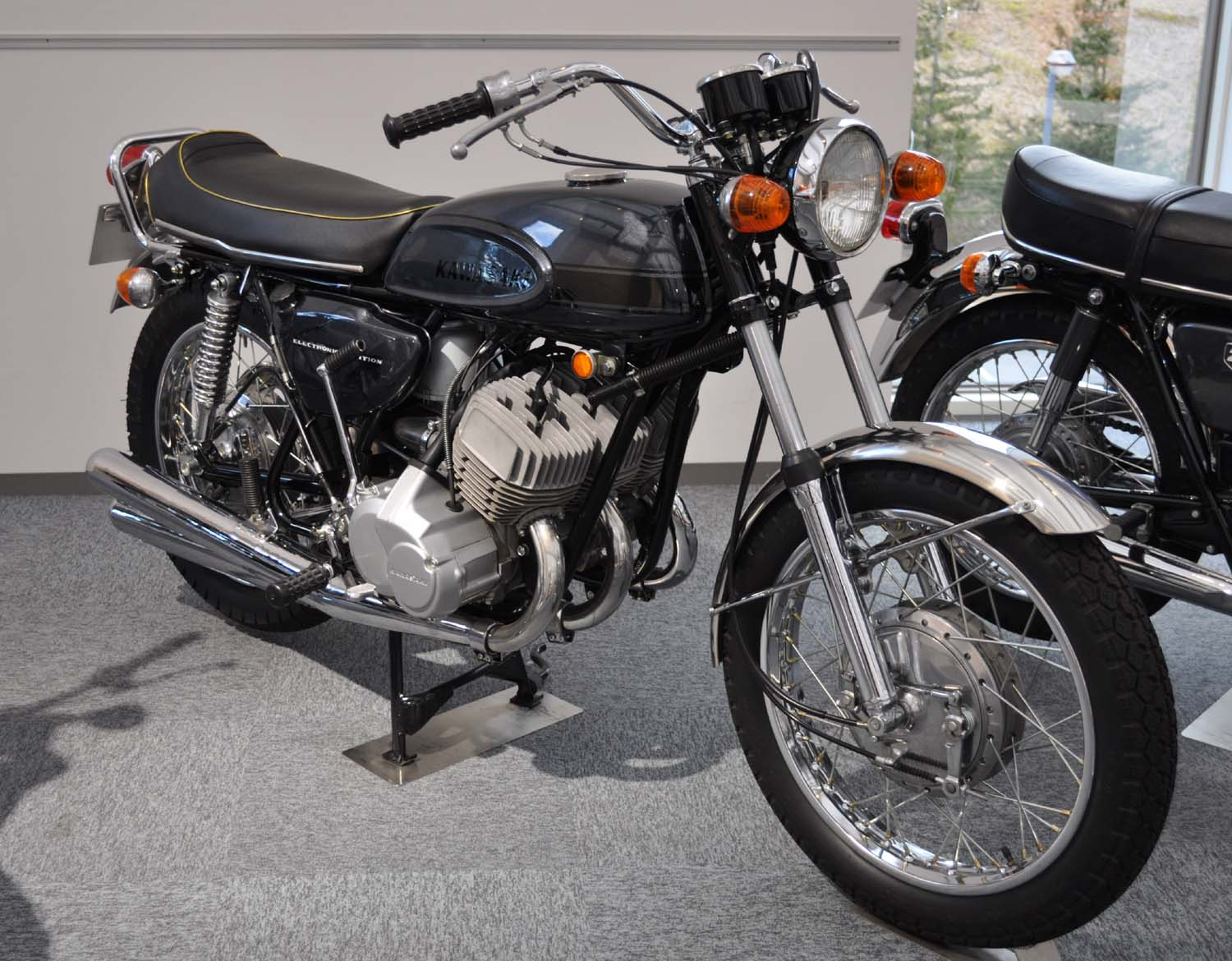
- 1970 Mach III H1 500SS
- Production: 1968–1976
- Engine: 498.75 cc (30.436 cu in) air-cooled piston port two-stroke triple 3 Mikuni 28 mm carburetors
- Bore / stroke: 60.0 mm × 58.8 mm (2.36 in × 2.31 in)
- Compression ratio: 6.8:1
- Top speed: 183–201 km/h (114–125 mph)
- Power: 45 kW (60 hp) @ 7,500–8,000 rpm
- Torque: 5.6 kg⋅m (55 N⋅m; 41 lbf⋅ft) @ 7,000 rpm
- Ignition type: CDI (except 1972, points)
- Transmission: Wet clutch, 5-speed, chain drive
- Frame type: Steel double cradle
- Suspension: Front: telescopic fork, Rear: Preload adjustable shock, swingarm
- Brakes: Front/rear 180 mm (7.1 in) drum (early models) Front disc, rear drum (later)
- Wheelbase: 1,430 mm (56.3 in)
- Weight: 174 kg (384 lb) (dry); 188 kg (414 lb) (wet)
- Fuel consumption: 10.2 l/100 km (28 mpg_{‑imp}; 23 mpg_{‑US})

The market for motorcycles in 1968 was changing from utilitarian transport to more aggressive sporting motorcycles that disregarded fuel economy and noise, in favor of quicker quarter mile times, which were prominently advertised by manufacturers. While Kawasaki had an inline-four, four-stroke engine in development, it was not going be ready in time to upstage the 1969 Honda CB750, so instead they moved up the release of their conventional piston-port two-stroke triple, with one 2009 writer describing it as "...something that would make a real splash". They turned to the N100 Plan, a project begun in June, 1967, whose intent was to design the most powerful production motorcycle engine in the world. They first considered increasing the bore of an existing engine but instead created an all-new engine, experimenting with both inline and L cylinder arrangements, with both two and three cylinders. They settled on an inline-three arrangement after testing showed that an inline layout did not adversely affect cooling of the middle cylinder.

The result of this project was the H1 Mach III, with a 15° inclined, inline-triple 498 cc (30.4 cu in) engine, first produced in September, 1968, 14 months after the N100 project began. The new model did indeed sell well with young men in the late 1960s, with total production eventually exceeding 110,000 units, though it was unpopular with authorities. The bike gave Kawasaki a "rebel" image, "outside the law", which played well with sport bike riders. The racing version, the H1R ridden by Ginger Molloy, took second place in the 1970 Grand Prix World Championship.

The H1 was the first multi-cylinder street motorcycle to use capacitor discharge ignition (CDI) which operated through an automotive style distributor, previously only used in off-road single cylinder motorcycles. The first version of this electronic ignition was overly complex and proved unreliable, so Kawasaki gave up on it briefly, using traditional breaker points, one set for each cylinder, in 1972. For the 1973 H1D, a redesigned CDI was used, which was more reliable with a hotter spark at lower engine speeds, which in turn made it possible to re-jet the three Mikuni carburetors for a wider power band. The US version came with a high handlebar, but a low bar was used in the European market.

The bike had both detractors and enthusiastic fans, who either complained of poor handling and tendency to wheelie, or praised the power, light weight, and tendency to wheelie. For inexperienced riders the two-stroke engine's suddenly increasing power curve, with little response until a rush of power about 5,000 rpm, contributed to this unexpected liftoff of the front wheel, creating "fearsome reputation". The Mach III became known to its critics as "dangerous for inexperienced riders".

The H1 had a high power-to-weight ratio for the time, 45 kW (60 hp) and a dry weight of 384 pounds (174 kg), comparable to a top racing motorcycle, but had generally poor handling and weak drum brakes front and rear. It could accelerate along the 1/4 mile test course in 12.4 seconds. When the H1 was first announced, Motorcycle Mechanics criticised Kawasaki for their "own ambitious claim" that it was "the fastest and best accelerating road machine ever produced, being capable of 124 mph and 12.4 sec. [sic] for the standing start quarter mile". Cycle World's 1969 test quoted 119.14 mph and 13.20 seconds, with bike-retailer Reads of London at 109 and 13.5, whereas Dutch motorcycle drag racer Henk Vink, importer of Kawasakis into the Netherlands, was quoted as achieving 13.48. According to a 2020s motorcycle business, Kawasaki had an early production model H1 delivered to Lyon's Drag Strip, an AHRA sanctioned drag strip in Southern California were they uncrated it, put fuel in it and with Tony Nicosia as the rider it went 12:96 seconds making the Mach III officially the first production motorcycle to cover 1/4 mile from a standing start in less than 13 seconds.

Motorcycle Classics said in 2009 that the frequent complaints about the brakes of the H1 by modern writers did not account for the generally poor braking of all motorcycles of the period, noting that in a 1970 Cycle magazine comparison of seven top bikes of the time, the H1's braking performance was second only to the Honda CB750. Cycle World's test found: "Repeated high speed stops did not disclose any braking difficulties. The two-leading-shoe front stopper performed the task of slowing this...very admirably, but without locking the wheel. The rear brake...would lock up the back end any time, even after several high speed stops.".

While Kawasaki was working to "make the H1 acceptable in civilized society", they also released the delayed inline-four four-stroke, the Z1, in 1972, which had adequate brakes and handling, comfortable seating, and did not guzzle fuel. The sales success of the Z1 demonstrated that there were more buyers for higher-priced but less obnoxious sport bikes, than buyers who would accept numerous compromises for an extremely fast motorcycle at a low price. More stringent noise and pollution regulations also contributed to the end of the H1 500 production, whose final year was 1976.

The Mach III H1 500 subsequently has been of great interest to collectors and historians of motorcycles, often appearing on lists of most significant motorcycles. The H1 was included in the Guggenheim Museum's 1999 The Art of the Motorcycle exhibition in New York, Chicago, Las Vegas, and Bilbao, Spain. Motorcycle historian Clement Salvadori noted in the Guggenheim's catalog that the H1, "was one of the least useful motorcycles available on the market" yet still sold very well because, in the heyday of American muscle cars where quarter mile times were paramount to the young male target buyer, it "could blow just about anything else off the road — for less than $1,000." Motorcycling author and journalist Roland Brown wrote that it could "beat almost anything away from the lights." Salvadori added that "Motorcycle lore has it that very few original owners of the Mach III survived." While older Baby boomers collected classic brands of the 1950s and 1960s like BSA, Norton and Triumph, a younger generation of motorcycle collectors was nostalgic for H1 Mach IIIs along with other bikes of the era, Honda CBs and CLs, Yamaha RD350s and Suzuki Hustlers.

== S1 250 and S2 350 ==
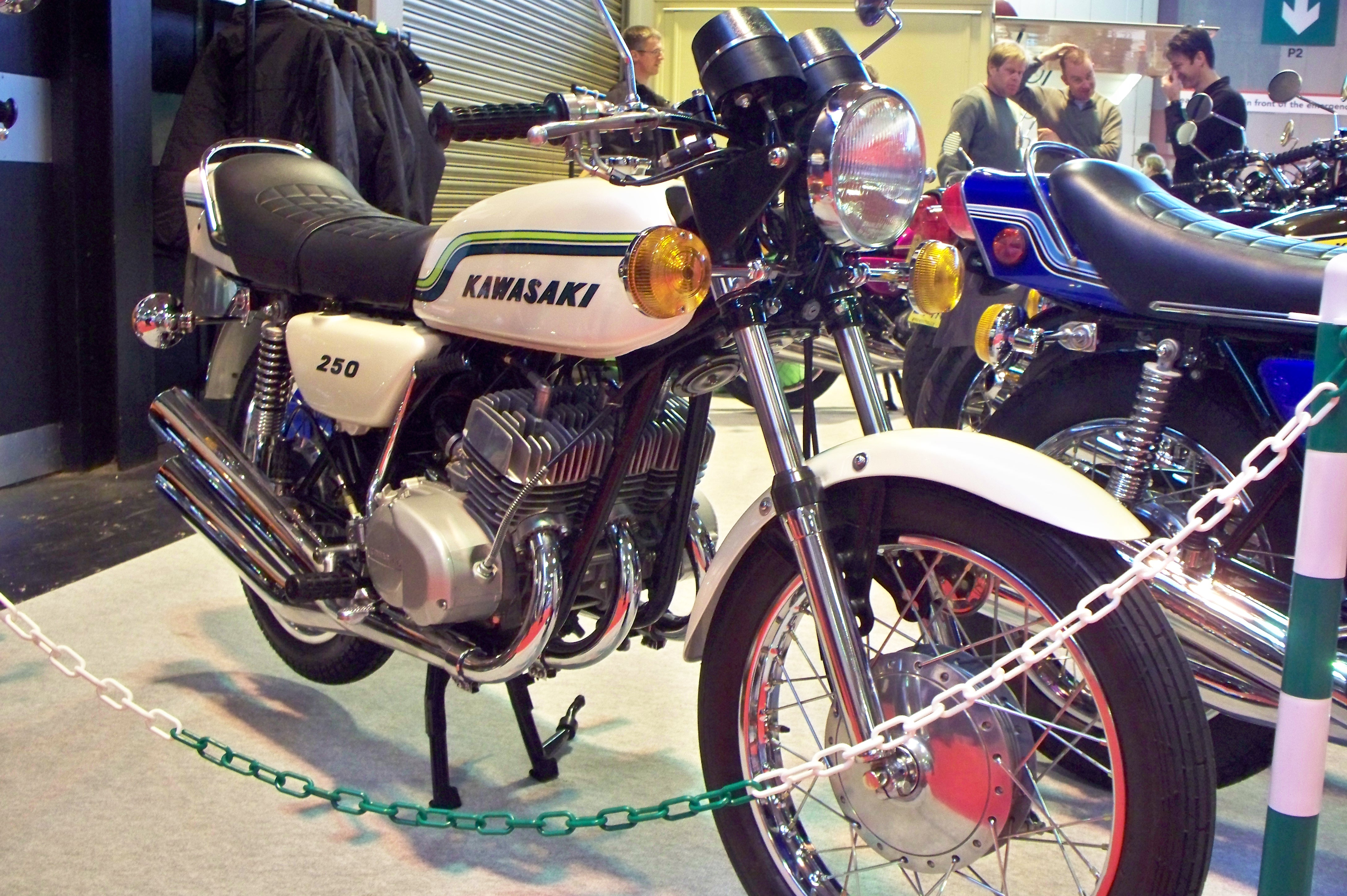
S1 Mach I 250

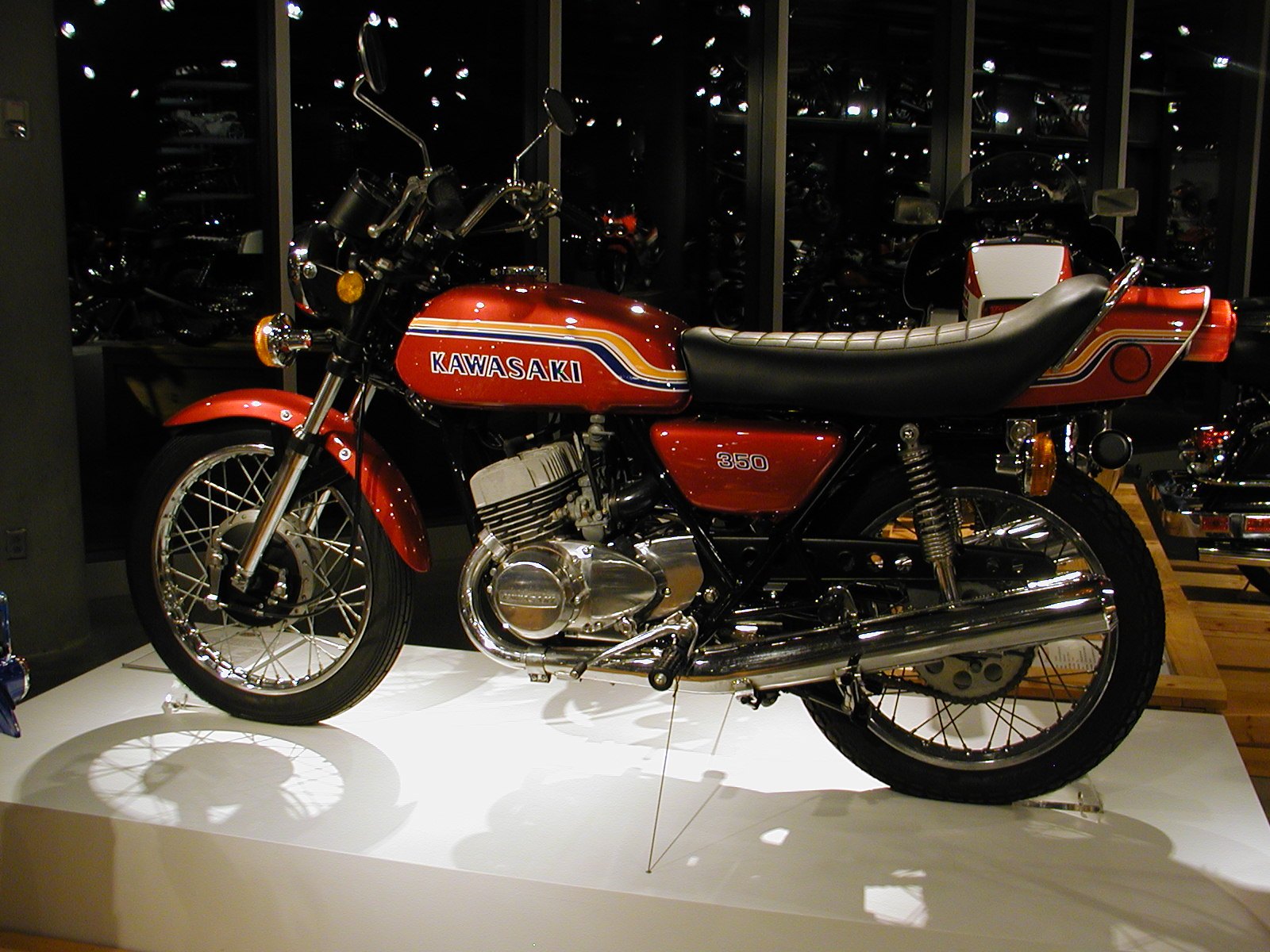
S2 Mach II 350

In 1971, the S2 350 was introduced, and in 1972 its smaller brother, the S1 250 became available.

== H2 Mach IV 750 ==
H2 Mach IV 750
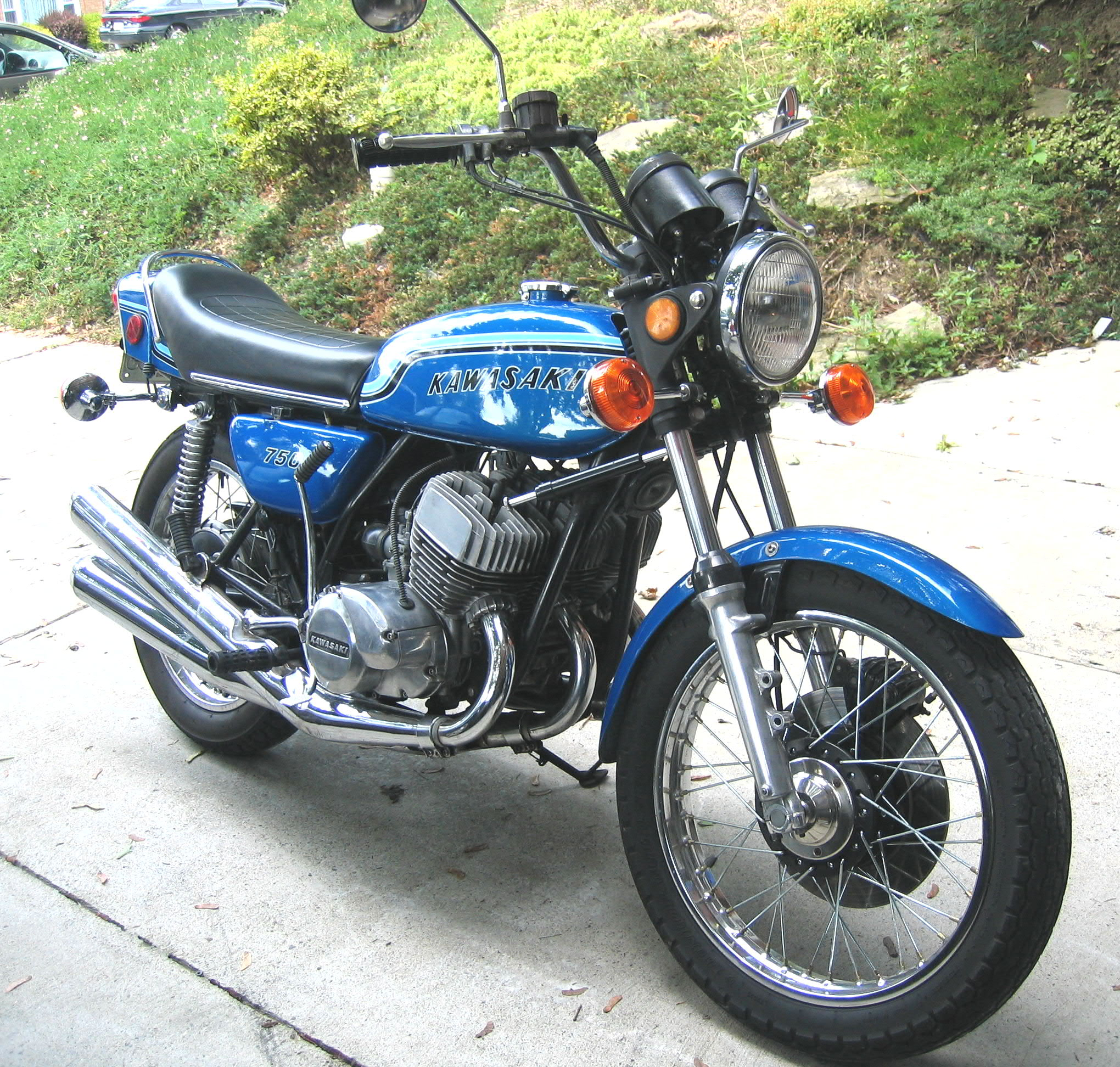
- Production: 1972–1975
- Engine: 748 cc (45.6 cu in) air-cooled piston port two-stroke triple 3 Mikuni carburetors
- Bore / stroke: 71 mm × 63 mm (2.8 in × 2.5 in)
- Compression ratio: 7.0:1
- Top speed: 190 km/h (120 mph)
- Power: 55 kW (74 hp) @ 6,800 rpm (claimed)
- Torque: 77.4 N⋅m (57.1 lb⋅ft) @ 6,600 rpm (claimed)
- Ignition type: CDI
- Transmission: Multi-disc, wet clutch, 5-speed, chain drive
- Frame type: Steel double cradle
- Suspension: Front: telescopic fork Rear: twin shocks, swingarm
- Brakes: Front: disc Rear drum
- Tires: Front: 3.25×19"; Rear: 4.0×18"
- Wheelbase: 1,410 mm (55.5 in)
- Dimensions: W: 810 mm (32.0 in)
- Seat height: 830 mm (32.5 in)
- Weight: 206 kg (454 lb); 210.2 kg (463.5 lb) (wet)
- Fuel capacity: 17 L; 3.7 imp gal (4.5 US gal)
- Oil capacity: 2.0 L; 3.5 imp pt (4.2 US pt)

The H2 750 was introduced in 1971, the culmination of Kawasaki's two-stroke project. Kawasaki said of the bike, "It's so quick it demands the razor-sharp reactions of an experienced rider."

Its engine displacement of 748 cc (45.6 cu in) produced 55 kW (74 hp) at 6,800 rpm. The engine was entirely new and not a bored-out 500. With larger displacement as well as less aggressive porting and ignition timing, the H2 750 had a wider power band than the 500 H1, though Brown said it was still "barely more practical" than the smaller predecessor, because Kawasaki had "done little" to address chassis problems, and so the bike was still prone to speed wobble. The 14 bhp (10 kW) gain over the 500 H1 put the H2's output well ahead of its close rivals, the air-cooled four-stroke Honda CB750 and the liquid-cooled two-stroke Suzuki GT750.

To help address the speed wobble issue, the H2 came with a friction-type steering damper, as well as a built-in frame lug to attach a hydraulic steering damper. The H2 had a front disc brake, an all-new capacitor discharge ignition system which performed better than cap and rotor type, was virtually maintenance free, and was unique to the H2. The H2 also had a chain oiler, and a steering friction damper.

Even with its limitations, the H2 was a success, because there were not many other bikes that could, Brown said, "even approach" the performance of the H2 Mach IV. A standard, factory produced H2 was able to travel a 1/4 mi (0.40 km) from a standing start in as low as 12.0 seconds with an expert rider on board. Cycle World recorded a quarter mile time of 12.72 seconds at 103.8 mph (167.0 km/h), and a top speed of 119.7 mph (192.6 km/h). Brown said it could accelerate from 0 to 100 mph (0 to 161 km/h) in under 13 seconds.

The H-2 was comparison tested by Cycle magazine in 1973 against the Ducati 750, the Honda CB750, the Harley-Davidson Sportster 1000, the Kawasaki Z1, the Meriden Trident, and the Norton Commando 750. The competition consisted of acceleration, braking distance, and road race course lap-times. Each test was run several times including 10 attempts at a fastest road course time. The H2 was the fastest accelerating machine, posting the fastest 1/4 mile run on a drag strip. Cycle's testers were surprised that despite an uncomfortable feel and slight front wheel hop under hard braking and not giving the sensation of stopping particularly fast, it had the shortest stopping distance and highest braking G load of all the bikes, winning best in class measured by stopping power from 60 mph. On the road course, despite what had been heard and written about its ill handling, frame flexing and the supposed tendency to speed wobble exiting high speed turns, the H2 was tied for the fastest lap time with the Kawasaki Z-1 to the tenth of a second. Overall the Kawasaki H-2 750 had the lowest ET, second-highest quarter-mile speed, the fastest lap time, the strongest braking force, the highest torque and horsepower readings on the dynamometer, the highest power-to-weight ratio, the lowest price and scored by points for performance was by far the least expensive per unit displacement. Brown's assessment was that the front disc brake performed adequately, though some riders added a second front disc for more braking performance.

In 1975 Cycle World tested the H2 Mach IV's quarter mile at 13.06 seconds 99.55 mph (160.21 km/h), with a 0 to 60 mph time of 4.3 seconds, 0 to 100 mph time of 13.2 seconds, and a top speed of 110 mph (180 km/h).

Kawasaki's reputation for building what motorcycle writer Alastair Walker called, "scarily fast, good-looking, no holds barred motorcycles" began with the H1. The H2 was part of the rise of the Japanese superbikes, contributing to the decline of Harley Davidson, and nearly extinguished the British motorcycle industry in the US for a long period.

== S3 400 ==
In 1974, the 350 cc (21 cu in) S2 was expanded to and replaced by a 400 cc (24 cu in) S3. In addition, each model year following was met with toned down performance in attempt to meet new emissions regulations. The H and S series ceased production after 1975, and the model line became the KH series in 1976, omitting the 750 from the lineup and leaving just the KH250, KH400 and KH500. The KH250 was a "parts bin" bike for the U.S. market, it had the new KH250 styling but retained the drum brake from its predecessor the S1c, the new disc braked KH250 never made it to the U.S. market and faded away during 1976 leaving only the KH400 left in the triple lineup. Both models continued to be available in Europe and elsewhere until 1980. Stricter emissions regulation and advances in 4-stroke technology caused the demise of the Kawasaki triples in both cases.

The S1 (250cc), and later KH250 (1976–1980) models were popular for some time as a budget performance bike in the UK (Great Britain), because of their small size (although the KH shared the same chassis and gearbox as the KH400), and the fact that at this point in time it was legal for learners to ride bikes with engine displacements of up to 250cc while holding a "Provisional Licence,” the acquisition of which did not require the passing of a test.

This usage stopped in February 1981, however, when learners were restricted to 125cc/12 bhp, and virtually overnight the sales of new 250cc machines ceased, not really taking off again until the Big Four started producing high performance 250s in the mid to late 80s in the form of the RG250 (later RGV), TZR, NSR and Kawasaki's class leading (but fragile) KR1 and KR1s.

== Timeline ==
- 1968
  - In addition to testing in Japan, prototype testing under the code name 'N100' included high-speed runs in the desert of the US southwest where many paved highways did not yet have speed limits.
  - H1 500 cc (31 cu in) Mach III (September) White w/blue stripes, distributor CDI ignition, drum front brake, "Mach III 500" badge on side cover and "electronic ignition" decal on oil tank. Early 69 models had bridged port intake design, with "windowed" carbs. Late 1969 saw the introduction of the Charcoal Grey model, but a common misconception is the charcoal grey model is called a 1969 model—it is indeed a 1970 model. Kawasaki paperwork that came with the bikes, and the sales brochures confirm this. This has been spread by many in order to add value to their bikes by being able to call them a first year model when they are not. The red and white model replaced the peacock grey model due to poor sales.
- 1971
  - H1A 500 cc (September)
- 1972 Entire line introduced, intended to be similar in style, with the "swooping" racing stripes on the tank that distinguished the triples.
  - S1 250 cc (15 cu in),
  - S2 350 cc (21 cu in), drum front brake
  - H1B 500 cc (January), orange, disc front brake, CDI dropped for breaker points, steering damper and a front disc brake.
  - H1C had CDI ignition instead of points as found on an H1B, and a front drum brake as opposed to the disk brake on the H1B model. The H1C carried over the stainless fenders from 1971 along with the complete fork assembly and gauge style. Engines and exhaust were also carry overs from the 1971 model making it a true hybrid of the new 72 H1B and the 71 H1 models.
  - H2 750 cc (46 cu in), front disc brake, CDI ignition with one igniter unit per cylinder.
- 1973
  - S1A 250 cc
  - S2A 350 cc
  - H1D 500 cc Adopted H2's CDI ignition and the styling that would be used on the later 1974 models, including a wider seat and tail section paint matching the other body panels.
  - H2A 750 cc
- 1974 All models restyled with a new cleaner design that resembled the Kawasaki Z-1, with an instrument "pod" rather than separate instruments. All models revised for more civilized performance at the expense of raw power.
  - S1B 250 cc front drum brake.
  - S3 400 cc disc front brake, restyled cylinder head design for better cooling.
  - H1E 500 cc
  - H2B 750 cc
- 1975
  - S1C 250 cc
  - S3A 400 cc
  - H1F 500 cc
  - H2C 750 cc
- 1976 H2 dropped from line, models renamed "KH" to match the "KZ" line of four-strokes.
  - KH-250 250 cc
  - KH-400 400 cc
  - KH-500 500 cc
- 1977–1980 Only surviving models are the KH-250 and KH-400.
