= Motorcycle fairing =

Motorcycle shell

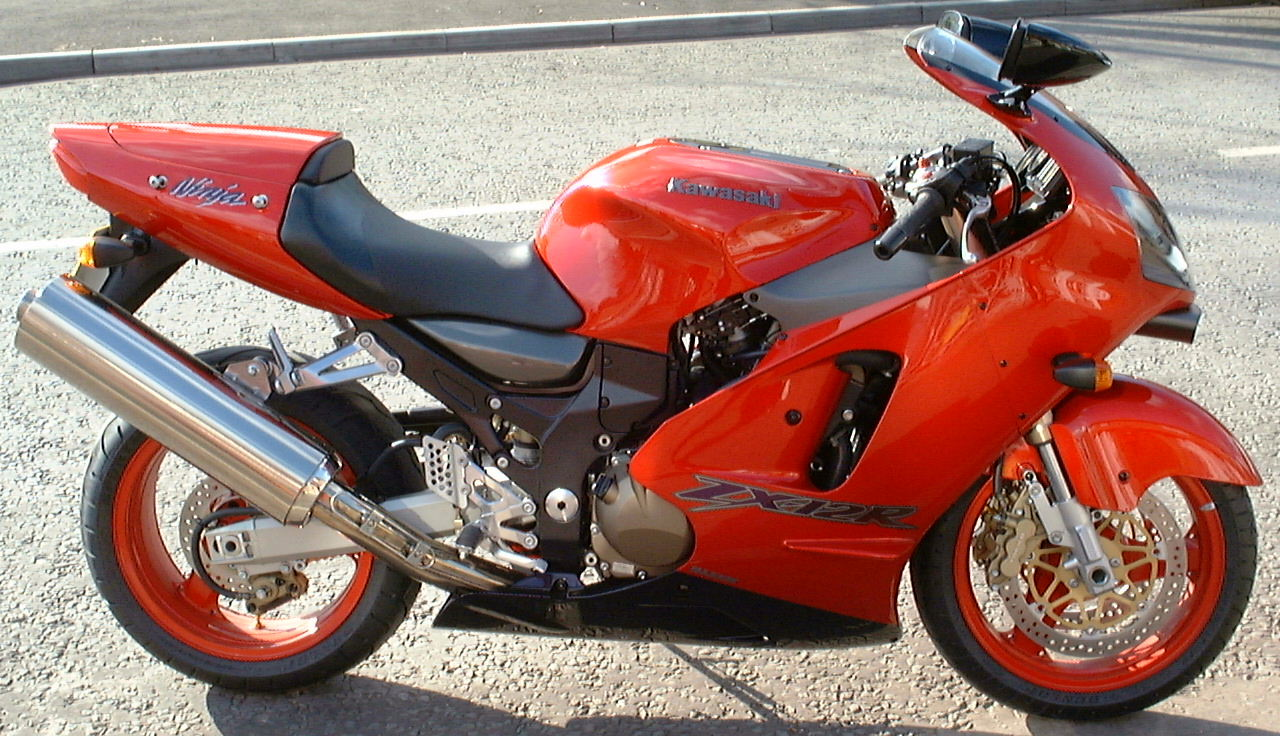
Kawasaki Ninja ZX-12R full fairing

A motorcycle fairing is a shell placed over the frame of a motorcycle, especially racing motorcycles and sport bikes, to deflect wind and reduce air drag. The secondary functions are the protection of the rider from airborne hazards and wind-induced hypothermia and of the engine components in the case of an accident. A motorcycle windshield will usually be integrated into the design of the fairing.

The major benefit of a fairing on sport touring and touring motorcycles is a reduction in aerodynamic drag, which allows for reduced fuel consumption and permits higher speeds at lower engine rpm, which in turn increases engine life.

A motorcycle may have a front fairing, a rear fairing, a belly fairing, or any combination of these. Alternatively, a single fairing may partially or fully enclose the entire motorcycle, and may even enclose the rider.

== History ==
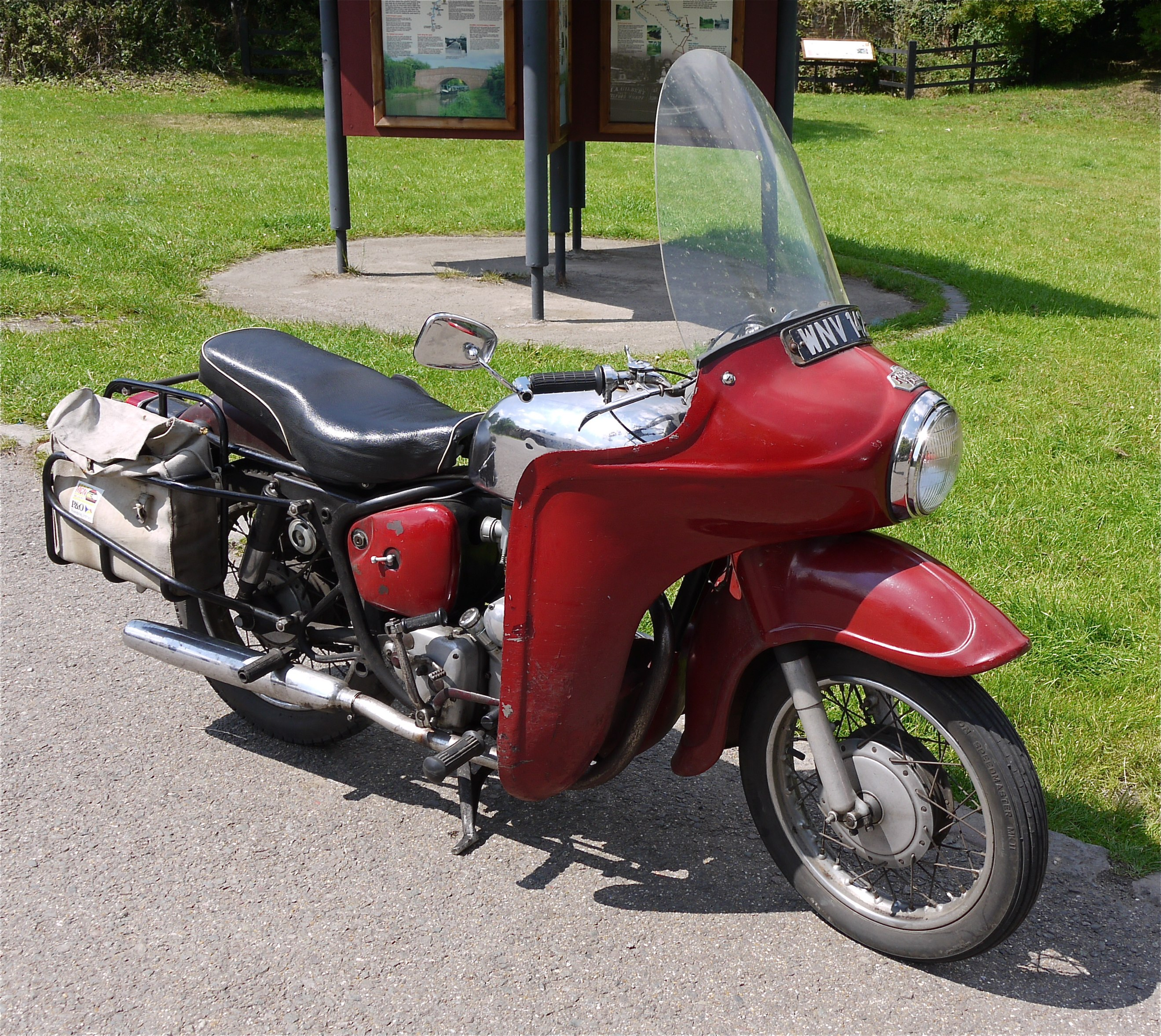
Royal Enfield Bullet with factory-optional Airflow touring-fairing and matching front wheel streamlining

The importance of streamlining was known very early in the 20th century, and some streamlining was seen on racing motorcycles as early as the 1920s. Although motorcycles generally have a much higher power-to-weight ratio than cars, bikes – and particularly the rider – are much less streamlined and the effects of aerodynamic drag on motorcycles are very significant. Consequently, any reduction in a motorcycle's drag coefficient pays dividends in improved performance.

The term fairing came into use in aircraft aerodynamics with regard to smoothing airflow over a juncture of components where airflow was disrupted. Early streamlining was often unsuccessful resulting in instability. Handlebar fairings, such as those on Harley-Davidson Tourers, sometimes upset the balance of a motorcycle, inducing wobble.

Originally the fairings were cowlings put around the front of the bike, increasing its frontal area. Gradually they became an integral part of the design. Modern fairings increase the frontal area at most by 5% compared to a naked machine. Fairings may carry headlights, instruments, and other items. If the fairing is mounted on the frame, placing other equipment on the fairing reduces the weight and rotational inertia of the steering assembly, improving the handling.

The BMW R100RS, produced from 1976 to 1984, was the first mass-market sport touring motorcycle to be offered with a full fairing as standard, and marked the beginning of wider adoption of fairings on sports and touring types of motorcycles. The integrated design included a development of the frame-mounted tail fairing at the rear of the removable dual seat accessing a storage compartment used on the BMW R90S from 1973, also being the first example of a factory-fitted head (or nose) fairing.

== Types ==
=== Front fairings ===
==== Dustbin ====
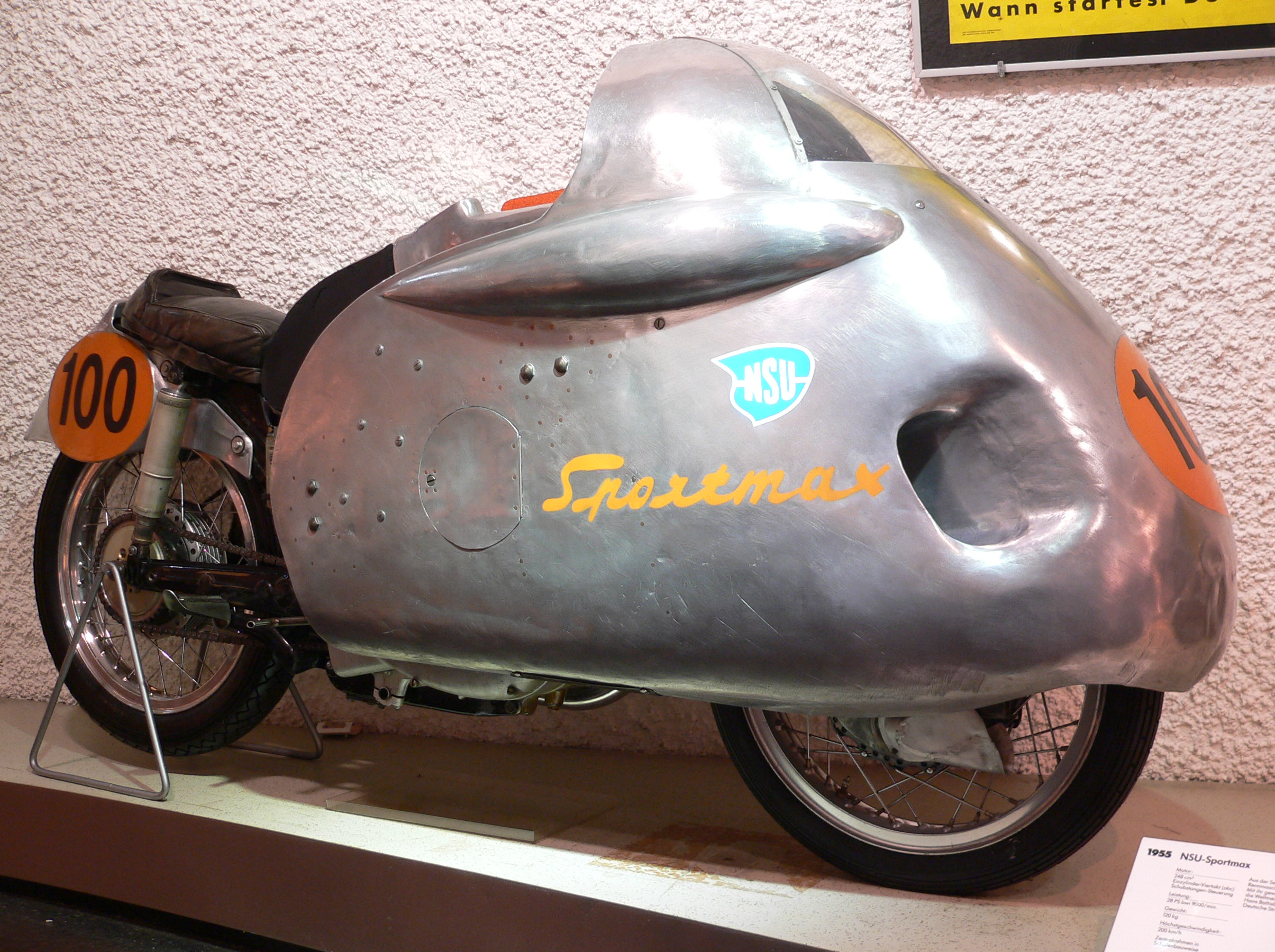
NSU Sportmax 1955, dustbin fairing

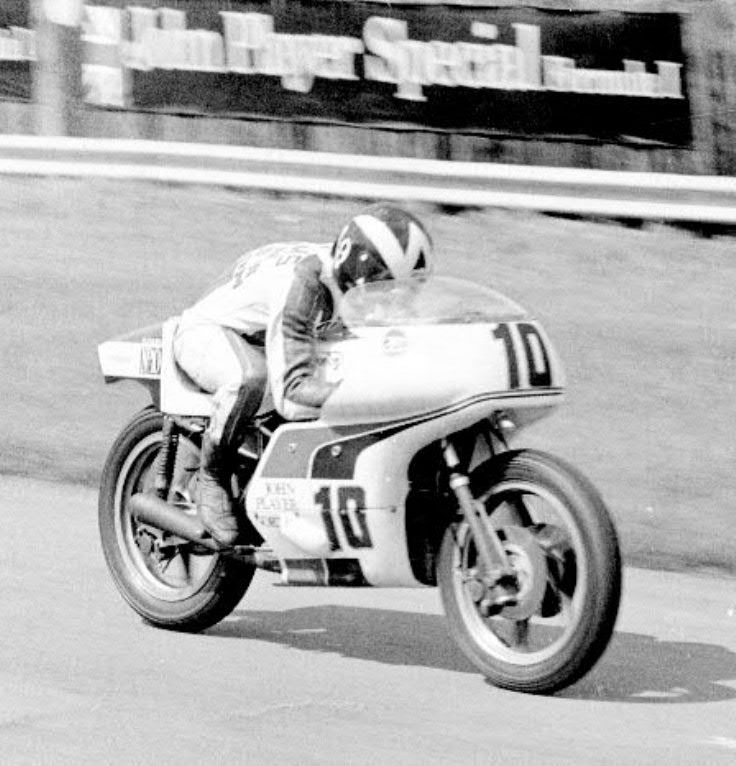
JPS Norton with handlebar blisters

A single piece, streamlined shell covering the front half of a motorcycle resembling the nose of an aircraft, sometimes referred to as torpedo fairing. It dramatically reduced the frontal drag, but it was banned by Fédération Internationale de Motocyclisme (FIM) from racing in 1958, because it was thought that the frontal point of wind pressure made them highly unstable even with small amounts of yaw. Other reasons cited for the ban were to ensure adequate steering range (lock-to-lock) and stability in crosswinds. FIM regulations forbid streamlining beyond the wheel spindles and require the rider's arms and legs to be visible from the side. However, Peter Williams was permitted to give his 1973/74 JPS Norton a Peel-type fairing incorporating handlebar blisters which helped to reduce the drag coefficient to 0.39.

==== Dolphin ====
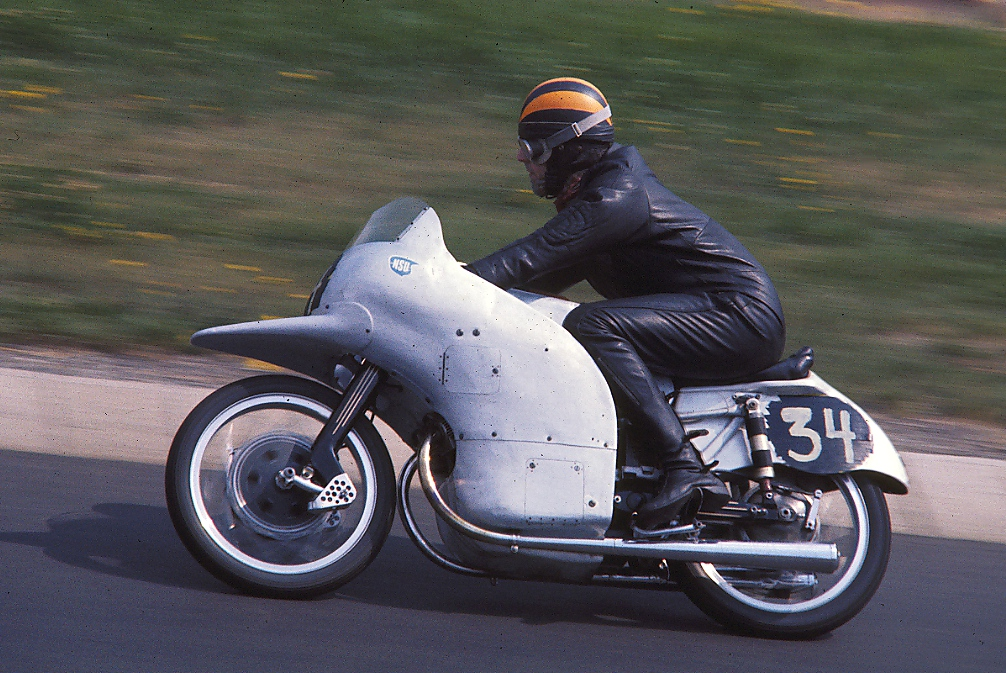
NSU Rennmax 250 cc Delphin, the original instance of the name Dolphin

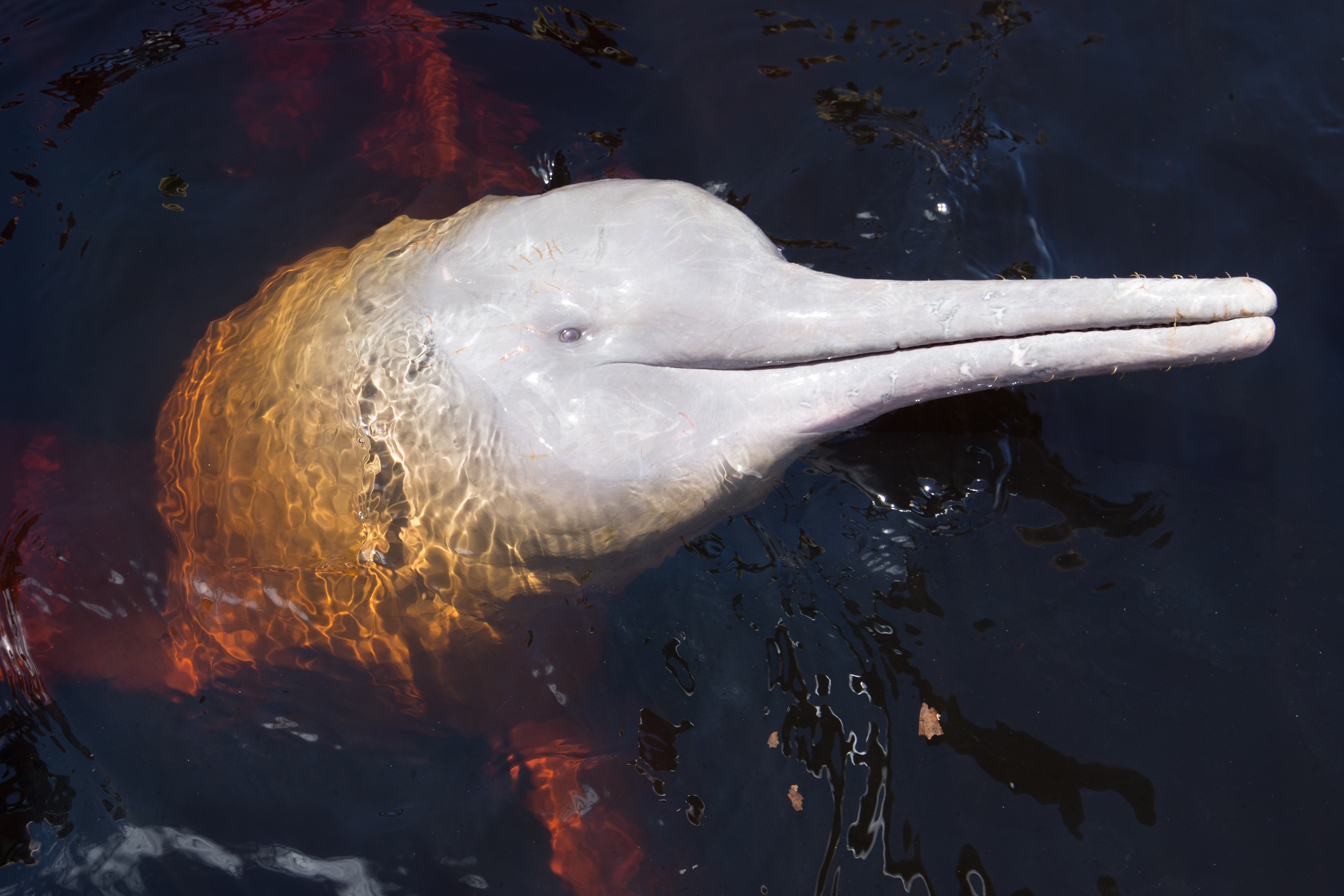
Amazon river dolphin (Inia geoffrensis)

This was called so because, in early models, the front wheel mudguard streamlined with the rising windshield part of the fairing resembled the river dolphin's snout from the side view. Further developments on this design became the norm after dustbin fairings were banned.

==== Full ====
A full fairing is a large front-mounted fairing, and should not be confused with cabin motorcycle or streamliner motorcycle fairings which fully or partially enclose the entire motorcycle.

Full fairings cover both upper and lower portions of the motorcycle, as distinct from a half fairing, which only has an upper section, and leaves the lower half of the motorcycle exposed. The fairing on a race or sport bike is meant as an aerodynamic aid, so the windscreen is rarely looked through. If the rider is sitting up at speed he will be buffeted by his rapid progress through the air and act as a parachute, slowing the bike, while if the rider lies flat on the tank behind the windscreen he generates much less aerodynamic drag. The high windscreen and handlebar width of a touring fairing protect the upright rider from the worst of this, and the windscreen is functional. Full fairings can also provide protection to the engine and chassis in the event of a crash where the fairings, rather than the engine covers and/or frame, slide on the road.

==== Half ====
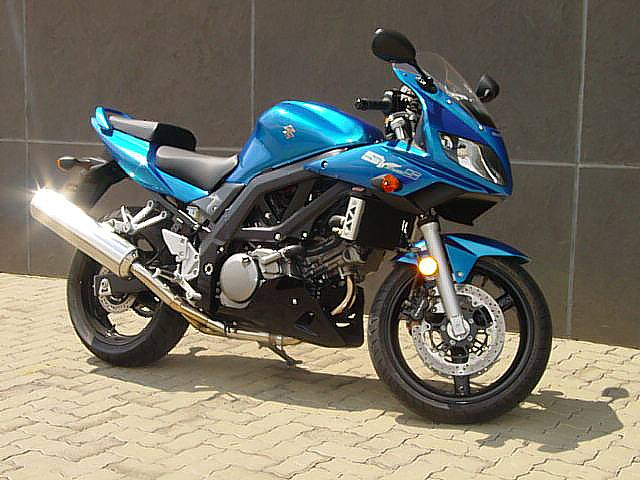
Suzuki SV650s with OEM half-fairing & rear-fairing, plus aftermarket bellypan

Half fairings usually feature a windscreen and extend below the handlebars, possibly as far down as the sides of the cylinder block, but generally do not cover the sides of the crankcase or gearbox. Aftermarket kits – 'lowers' – are available to extend some half fairings into full fairings. Due to the popularity of these kits, some motorcycle manufacturers have started to supply their own full fairing conversion kits and even offer their half faired models new with a full factory-fitted kit.

==== Quarter ====
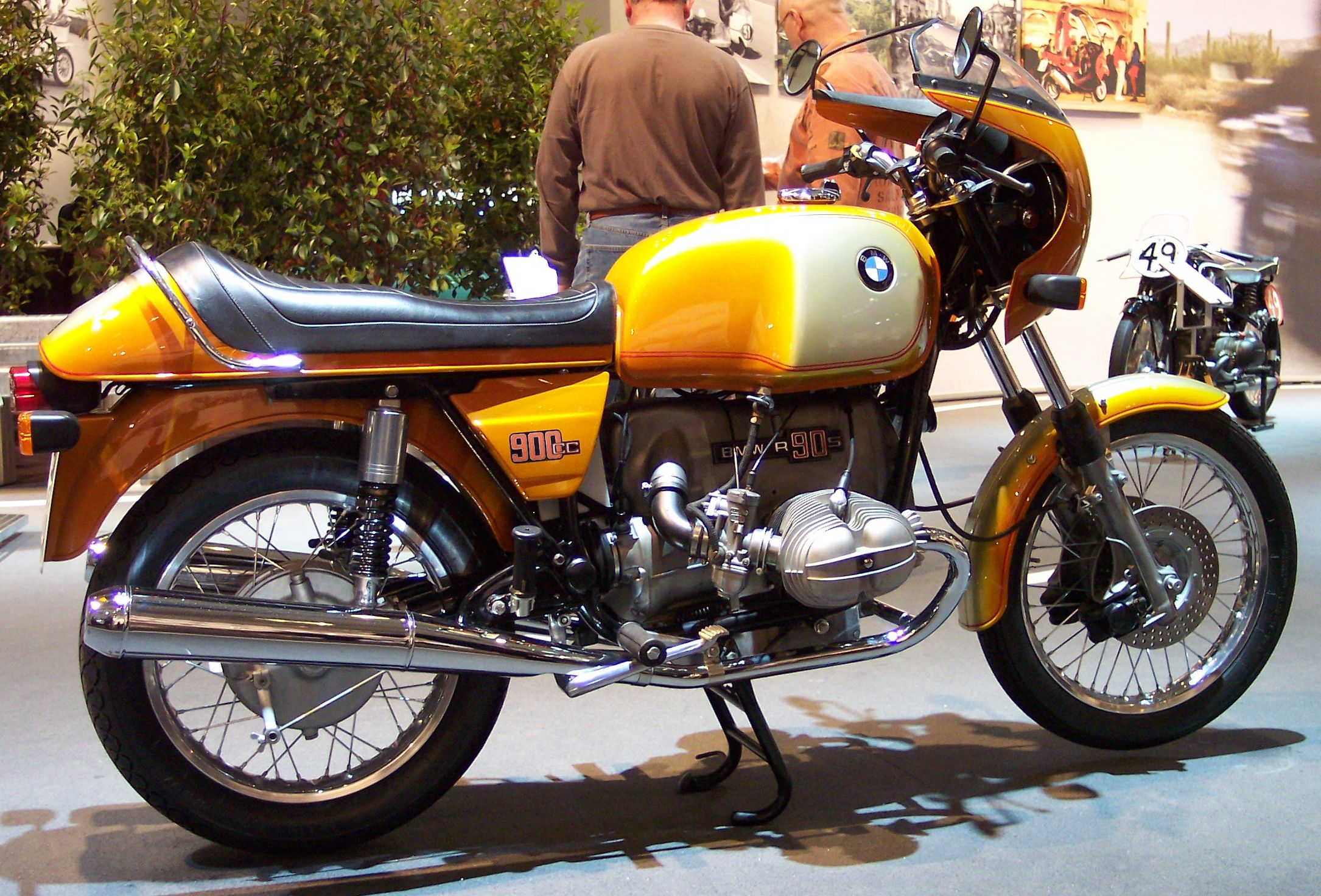
BMW R90S quarter fairing

A windscreen and minimal fairing extending around the headlamp fixed to the triple clamp. Also called a café fairing or bikini fairing, it stops well below the level of the rider's head, relying primarily on air deflection to protect the rider's head and chest from the slipstream.

==== Handlebar ====
A Handlebar fairing, also called headlight fairing or headlamp fairing, is not fixed to the main chassis as with other types of fairings, which do not move. A handlebar fairing complete with screen is like an expanded and extended nacelle. It is attached only to the forks or yokes, encompassing the headlight and instruments, and varying portions of the handlebars, and moves with them as the bars are turned.

==== Belly pan ====
Quarter and half fairings are often paired with a belly pan below the engine for diverting air flow away from under the engine to reduce aerodynamic lift, as well as cosmetic reasons. Some track day or racing rules require belly pans to catch leaked fluids.

=== Rear fairings ===
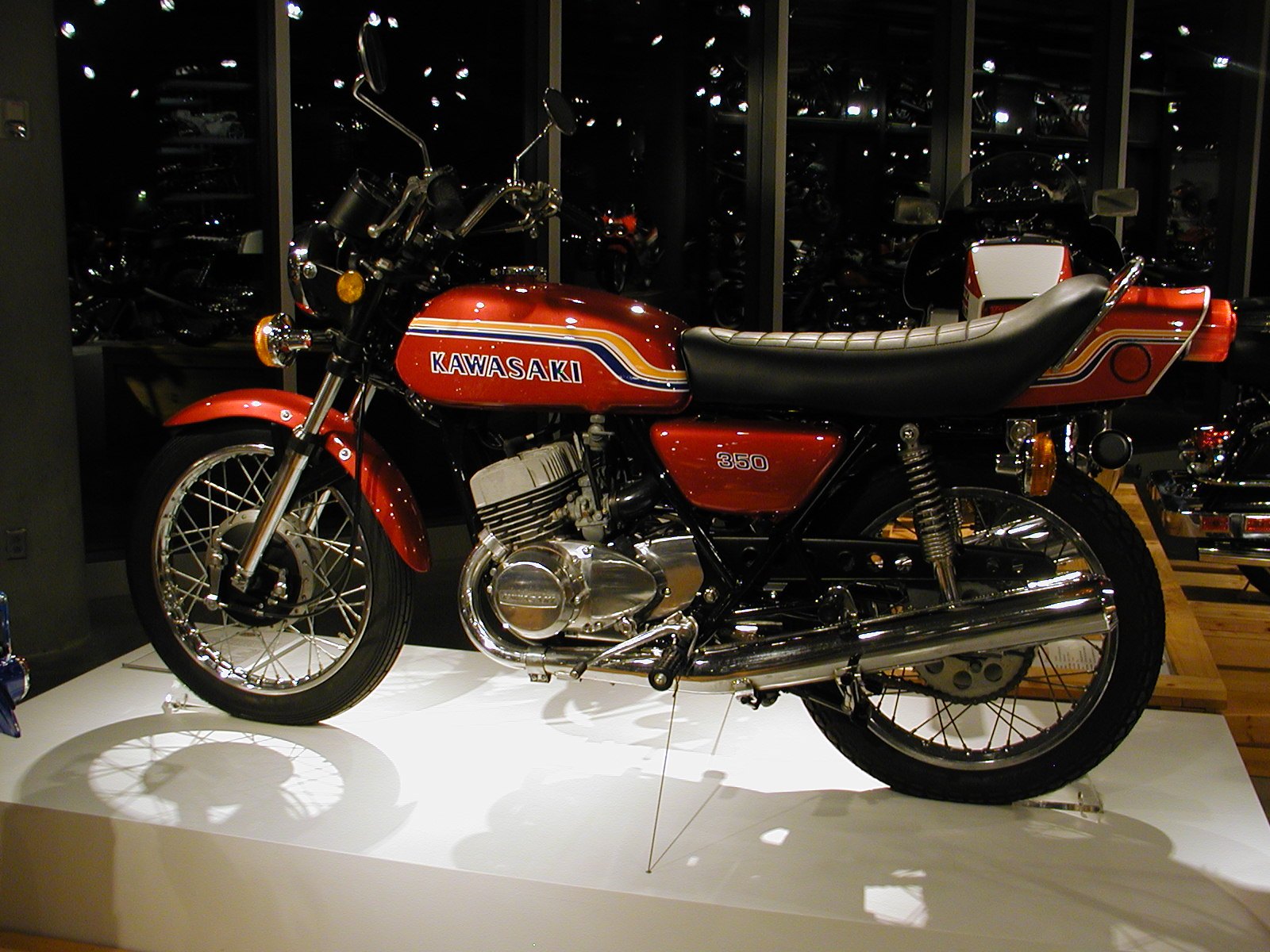
Tail fairing on a Kawasaki S2 mounting the tail light

A tail fairing, sometimes referred to as a tail unit or race tail, is mounted behind the seat and rider. Some also extend to the sides of, and below, the saddle and usually providing a small storage space. Particularly on sports/ race replica style bikes with dual seats, detachable colour matched Tail Humps are also available which either cover the passenger seat or are exchanged for it, blending in with the tail unit and side panels they give extra streamlining and the look of a single seater racing bike

Kawasaki became the first manufacturer to incorporate a tail fairing on a mass production motorcycle when tail units were fitted to the 1972 250cc S1 Mach I, 350cc S2 Mach II, and 750cc H2 Mach IV models.

=== Streamliner ===
A streamliner motorcycle, such as the NSU Delphin III, uses a fairing which completely encloses both the entire motorcycle and the rider to provide the best possible drag coefficient ratio.

== Materials ==
Acrylonitrile butadiene styrene (ABS) plastic is commonly used in original equipment sport bikes and certain aftermarket fairing manufacturers due to its strong, flexible and light weight properties. The advantage of ABS over other plastics is that it combines the strength and rigidity of acrylonitrile and styrene with the toughness of polybutadiene rubber. The proportions of each property vary based on the targeted result.

There are two common methods of producing an ABS plastic fairing: injection and compression molding.

- Injection molding: ABS plastic is melted and injected into mold cavity. Constant pressure is applied to allow for material shrinkage. The plastic then cools and hardens in the mold. Injection molds allows for uniform thickness throughout the entire piece. It gives the most accurate end product that fits well. It is how most manufacturers make their plastics.
- Compression molding: The plastic is generally preheated is placed into a heated metal mold cavity and pressure is applied to force the plastic to contract and take the shape of the mold. Heat and pressure is kept until the plastic cures the mold. The excess plastic is cut away and removed from the mold. Disadvantages to compression mold include varying product consistency and flashing, which is excess material attached to the molded part that needs to be removed where two or more parts of the mold meet.

Fiberglass is made of woven fibers, and is used as a reinforcing agent for many polymer products. The composite properly known as glass-reinforced plastic (GRP), is normally referred to by the name of its reinforcing material. Fiberglass fairings are commonly used on the race track. In most cases fiberglass is lighter, and more durable than ABS Plastic. Damaged fiberglass can be repaired by applying new layers of woven fiberglass cloth mixed with a polymer such as epoxy over the damaged area, followed by sanding and finishing.

Carbon-fiber-reinforced polymer is the lightest, but most expensive, fairing material. It is used on the most extreme sport and racing motorcycle fairings.

== See also ==
- Aircraft fairing
- Bicycle fairing
- Cowling
