= Fred Martinson =

American motorcycle racer

- Nationality: (United States) American
- Born: February 22, 1947; Virginia, Minnesota, U.S.
- Died: February 5, 2012 (aged 64); Casper, Wyoming, U.S.
- Current team: Retired

Fred Martinson (February 22, 1947 – February 5, 2012) was an American motorcycle trials rider. He was a four-time AHRMA Vintage National Trials Champion, winning titles in 2003, 2008, 2009 and 2010, competing in approximately 615 trials through his career. In 2011, he was inducted into the NATC Hall of Fame. The Martinson family are still deeply involved in the sport, with Fred's sons Derek and Brian competing at National level for many years, and now grandchildren are starting to also compete.

== Biography ==
Martinson was born in Virginia, Minnesota in 1947 and moved to Casper, Wyoming in 1981. It was while in Wyoming that he became involved with motorcycle trials riding, competing in his first event in 1983. As a long time member of the Wyoming Motorcycle Trials Association Fred was involved in setting eleven NATC events.

In 2001, Martinson turned his skills to riding in the AHRMA Vintage Nationals around the country, winning his first title in the Modern Classic Intermediate class in 2003.

The 2008 season was a tough one for Martinson. He was diagnosed with lung cancer and given 18 months to live. However, he didn't let this spoil his season and went on to take another AHRMA National title.

During his final season in 2011, Martinson continued to ride with the aid of an oxygen tank on his back, and was actually accused of cheating while at a California event as it was considered an advantage for high altitude riding. He rounded out his career with a fine second place in the AHRMA Nationals, quite remarkable considering Martinson's health at the time.

== AHRMA National Trials Championship Career ==
Year	Class	1	2	3	4	5	6	7	8	9	10	11	12	13	14	15	16	17	18	19	20	21	22	23	24	25	26	Points	Rank
2001	Modern Classic Int	AZ -	red -	GA -	hun -	OK -	CA -	MO -	CA -	IL -	MI -	CA -	OH -	hon -	sho -	WA -	CO; 3	gle -	mad -	IL -	TN -	TN -	CA -					13	44th
2002	Modern Classic Int	AZ -	FL -	GA; 3	OK -	CA -	MO -	CA -	IL -	WV -	MT; 2	CA; 2	CA; 3	OH -	WA -	CO; 2	IL -	TN; 9	TN; 9	CA -								86	2nd
2003	Modern Classic Int	AZ -	IL -	TX -	IL -	WY; 1	MT; 1	CA; 1	CA; 1	OH -	WA; 4	ash -	IL -	CO; 1	TN -	TN -	CA -											111	1st
2004	Modern Classic Exp	AZ -	FL -	CA; 4	CA; 3	mil -	IL -	IL -	IL -	OH -	WA -	WY; 4	WY; 4	CA; 5	CA; 1	CO; 3	TN -	TN -	jon -	CA -	GA -							89	5th
2005	Modern Classic Exp	CA -	CA -	FL -	TX -	TN -	IL -	IL -	IL -	OH -	WA -	MN; 5	MN; 6	WY; 3	WY; 4	CO; 5	NM -	TN -	TN -	CA -	GA -							53	8th
2006	Modern Classic Exp	AZ; 2	CA; 2	CA; 2	FL -	TX -	IL -	IL -	IL -	CA; 2	CA; 2	OH -	WA -	MN; 3	MN; 4	WY -	WY; 4	CO; 2	NM; 4	TN -	TN -	CA -	AL -	GA -				162	2nd
2007	Modern Classic Exp	AZ -	FL -	TX -	san -	CO; 4	IL -	IL -	IL -	bing -	CA; 3	CA; 4	OH -	WA -	MN -	MN -	WY -	WY; 5	NM -	TN; 3	CA -	AL -	was -					91	2nd
2008	Modern Classic Int	AZ; 4	FL -	TX -	CA -	CO; 1	CO; 1	CO; 3	IL -	IL -	IL -	CA; 1	CA -	OH -	WA -	WY; 1	WY; 1	WY; 1	UT -	UT; 2	NM -	TN -	TN -	CA -	AL -	GA -		136	1st
2009	Premier Lightweight Int	AZ; 1	AZ; 1	FL -	TX -	MD -	CO; 2	CO; 1	CO; 1	CA -	CA -	OH -	WA -	OH -	WA -	CO -	CO -	WY; 1	WY; 1	WY -	AL -	CA -	GA -	GA -				136	1st
2010	Modern Classic Int	AZ -	AZ -	FL -	OK; 1	OK; 3	TX -	OH -	OH -	CO; 1	CO; 1	WI -	CA; 3	CA -	WV -	WA -	WY; 2	WY; 1	WY; 2	UT; 1	UT; 1	CO -	TN -	TN -	AL -	CA -	GA -	140	1st
2011	Modern Classic Int	AZ -	AZ -	FL -	TX -	CO; 1	CO; 1	IL -	IL -	WI -	CA; 3	CA; 1	WV -	WA -	WY -	WY -	WY; 5	CO; 3	TN -	TN -	AL -	CA -						116	2nd

== Honors ==
- AHRMA Modern Classic Intermediate Champion 2003, 2008, 2010
- AHRMA Premier Lightweight Intermediate Champion 2009
- Elected to the NATC Hall of Fame in 2011

== Related Reading ==
- NATC Trials Championship
- AHRMA Vintage Nationals
