= N100 Plan =

The N100 Plan was the corporate code name for the top secret concept, engineering, and development of an entirely new motorcycle engine by Kawasaki Motorcycle Corporation, a division of Kawasaki Heavy Industries in 1966.

== Goal ==
The goal of Kawasaki engineering in the N100 Plan was to create a large bore, fast motorcycle engine for entry into the American market, the largest market for motorcycles. Honda had already introduced its successful Honda CB450 in 1965 and Kawasaki desired to enter that larger bore niche.

== Kawasaki directive ==
The N100 Plan called for an air-cooled standard motorcycle with an engine capacity of 500 cubic centimeters. The power output was set at no less than 60ps (equivalent to a per liter horsepower of 120ps). The performance minimum was to make a 13-second standing start 1/4 mile run (0–400 meters).

== Development ==
=== Three cylinder development ===
The Kawasaki engineers approached the N100 Plan in two ways. (1) Use an existing, tried and true Kawasaki A7 350 "Avenger", a 350 cc parallel twin-cylinder, rotary-disc engine, bored out to 500 cc or (2) develop an entirely new engineering layout, building an inline 3-cylinder, or create a new and groundbreaking "L-triple" design. All of these engines would be two-stroke and air-cooled.

The development team decided to utilize both twin-cylinder and triple-cylinder engines together as test engines. The largest concern was development of the 3-cylinder design and whether it would be an inline or a new "L-triple". The concern over the 3-cylinder design was cooling cylinder #2, the middle cylinder in either application. Osaka University's laboratory belonging to the Faculty of Engineering performed a number of tests on cooling of the engine as a whole, optimum length of cooling fins, and optimum cylinder pitch. It was determined that an inline configuration would not impair cooling.

=== Two-cylinder development ===
While testing the 3-cylinder, Kawasaki also went forward with the development and testing of its current two-stroke twin-cylinder rotary disc valve engine. The preliminary test results pointed to a very promising outcome. One possible advancement in the twin over the triple was keeping the rotary disc valve fuel/air intake which produced more horsepower than the conventional piston port or reed valve approach, which had been the case in other Kawasakis.

The Kawasaki technical team at the end decided on a conventional piston inlet port engine, with three inline cylinders.

== Road testing ==
The initial part of the 2nd test of the N100 was between Los Angeles and Las Vegas in late 1968 with the test rider Tony Nicosia. A new engine was installed at Las Vegas and the bike was run to Yuma, Arizona under normal road conditions with a return trip to Los Angeles. Improvements were reported at low speed, better electrical performance, and improved oil consumption @ 350 to 400 miles per quart. Problems were listed as bad piston and clutch noise.

== End results ==
In 1969, Kawasaki debuted the Kawasaki H1 Mach III, dubbed the world's fastest bike for its quarter mile time. The success of the Mach III lead directly to the development of the Kawasaki Mach II S2 350 in 1971, the Kawasaki S1 Mach I and Kawasaki H2 Mach IV 750 in 1972.
