= N100 (disambiguation) =

N100 may refer to:

- N100, a type of evoked potential in the brain
- N100 Plan, the corporate code name for the top secret concept, engineering and development of an entirely new motorcycle engine by Kawasaki Motorcycle Corporation
- N100 (mobile phone), the first mobile phone to have an integrated 10 megapixel CMOS sensor, TV tuner and a camcorder
- Pocket LOOX N100, a navigation system
- Tobu N100 series, an electric multiple unit train type
- The N100 Alder Lake § Alder Lake-N mobile Intel processor released in 2023 supporting up to 16 GB of up to 4800 MHz RAM
- The N100 NIOSH air filtration rating § Current classifications
