= Kawasaki H2 =

Kawasaki H2 may refer to one of the following:

- Kawasaki H2 Mach IV, a 750 cc 3-cylinder two-stroke production motorcycle from the 1970s
- Kawasaki Ninja H2, a supercharged motorcycle announced in 2014
