= Kawasaki H1 Mach III =

Kawasaki H1
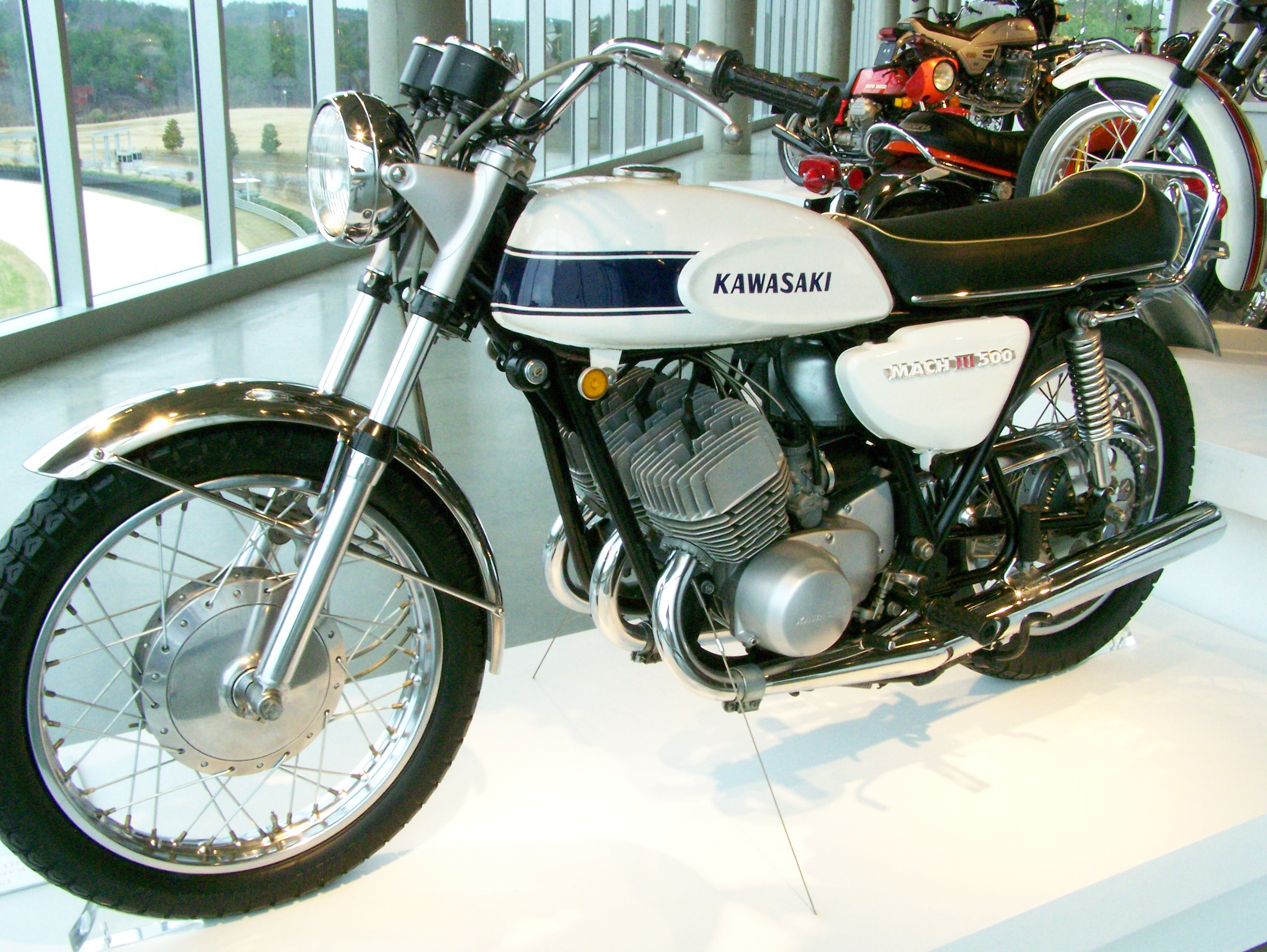
- Mach III at Barber Vintage Motorsports Museum
- Manufacturer: Kawasaki Motors
- Also called: Mach III
- Parent company: Kawasaki Heavy Industries
- Production: 1969-1975
- Predecessor: Kawasaki W2
- Successor: Kawasaki Z500/Z550; Kawasaki Z650
- Class: Standard street
- Engine: Air-cooled 3-cylinder, two-stroke
- Bore / stroke: 60.0 mm × 58.8 mm (2.36 in × 2.31 in)
- Compression ratio: 6.8:1
- Transmission: Chain driven 5-speed, manual
- Suspension: Inner spring telescopic front fork, three-position spring preloaded adjustable shock absorber and swing arm (rear)
- Fuel capacity: 13.9 L (3.1 imp gal; 3.7 US gal)
- Related: Kawasaki S1 Mach I, Kawasaki S2 Mach II, Kawasaki H2 Mach IV

The Kawasaki H1 Mach III was a two-stroke 500 cc sport bike made by Kawasaki from 1969 through to 1975.

== History ==
By mid-1960s, the US had become the largest motorcycle market. American riders were demanding bikes with more horsepower and higher maximum speeds. Kawasaki already had the largest-displacement Japanese machine with their 650 cc four-stroke W series, but it did not fit the niche Kawasaki was aiming for. Honda had introduced its Honda CB450 in 1965 and in 1969, the Suzuki T500 Titan/Cobra appeared. Also in development was the Yamaha XS 650. Already familiar with the Honda CB450, Kawasaki development began work on the top secret N100 Plan in 1967.

The goal was to produce a motorcycle with 500 cc displacement that was able to develop 60 hp and have 13-second quarter-mile times, then considered over the achievable limit for a road bike. When announced, the H1 was critiqued in UK motorcycling press for their "own ambitious claim" of "the fastest and best accelerating road machine ever produced, being capable of 124 mph and 12.4 sec. [sic] for the standing start quarter mile". Cycle World's 1969 test quoted 119.14 mph and 13.20 seconds, with bike-retailer Reads of London at 109 and 13.5, whereas Dutch motorcycle drag racer Henk Vink, importer of Kawasakis into the Netherlands, was quoted as achieving 13.48.

The Mach III appeared in the US in 1969 with a white sculpted fuel tank and blue racing stripe along the lower part of the tank, and special Dunlop K77 tires.

The engine was a three-cylinder two stroke with a displacement of 499 cc (30.5 cu in). It had Mikuni VM 28 mm carburetors, and thyristor-based capacitor discharge ignition (CDI) developing 25,000–30,000 volts.

Though not a direct successor of the Kawasaki W2, the W2 was the only four-stroke motorcycle Kawasaki had for the American market and that market was not like that of Japan where the W2 sold well. In the US, the Mach III proved to be very popular. Motorcyclist said the Mach's power-to-weight ratio was the best "ever produced in a motorcycle meant to sell to anyone who has the money to purchase it."

Handling characteristics were not favorable according to many sources. "Viewed logically, the Kawasaki H1 had many flaws. The gearbox was odd, with neutral below first, the brakes very questionable and the handling decidedly marginal in every situation - except when the bike was stopped with the engine switched off. Not for nothing was the H1 known as, 'The triple with the ripple'."

The three-cylinder 500 was for all purposes succeeded in 1979 by the Kawasaki Z500/Z550 four-stroke four cylinder.

== Motorsport competition ==
Kawasaki developed a racing derivative of the H1 called the Kawasaki H1R. In 1970, Ginger Molloy finished second to Giacomo Agostini on the dominant MV Agusta in the 500 cc world championship. In 1971, Dave Simmonds rode the HR1 to victory at the season ending Spanish Grand Prix at Jarama when Agostini sat out the race after already winning the championship. It would mark Kawasaki's first victory in the premier 500 cc class.

A standard H1 Mach III motorcycle ridden by Keith Martin won the 500cc Production Class at the 1974 Isle of Man TT.

== Specifications ==
- Induction: 3x Mikuni VM28SC carbs.
- Ignition: Kick start.
- Frame: Double cradle tube frame with twin top tubes reinforced at three intermediate points.
- Front and Rear Brakes: 200mm drum front, 180mm drum rear. Later to a Single 296mm disc for the front

== Changes by year ==
- 1971 — H1A new fuel tank without knee recesses
- 1972 — H1B CDI replaced with a battery ignition, front disc brake, steering oil damper adopted
- 1973 — H1D 2nd generation race tail that partially covered taillight similar to the H2, CDI unit from the H2, dropped steering damper and rear brake air scoop and rear brake rod replaced rear brake cable.
- 1974 — H1E new CDI unit and crank case check valve
- 1975 — H1F
- 1976 — KH500 slightly less horsepower (52),, different gear shift pattern (previously all H series were 5 up, changed to 1 down 4 up), water resistant brake pads
