= Kawasaki S1 Mach I =

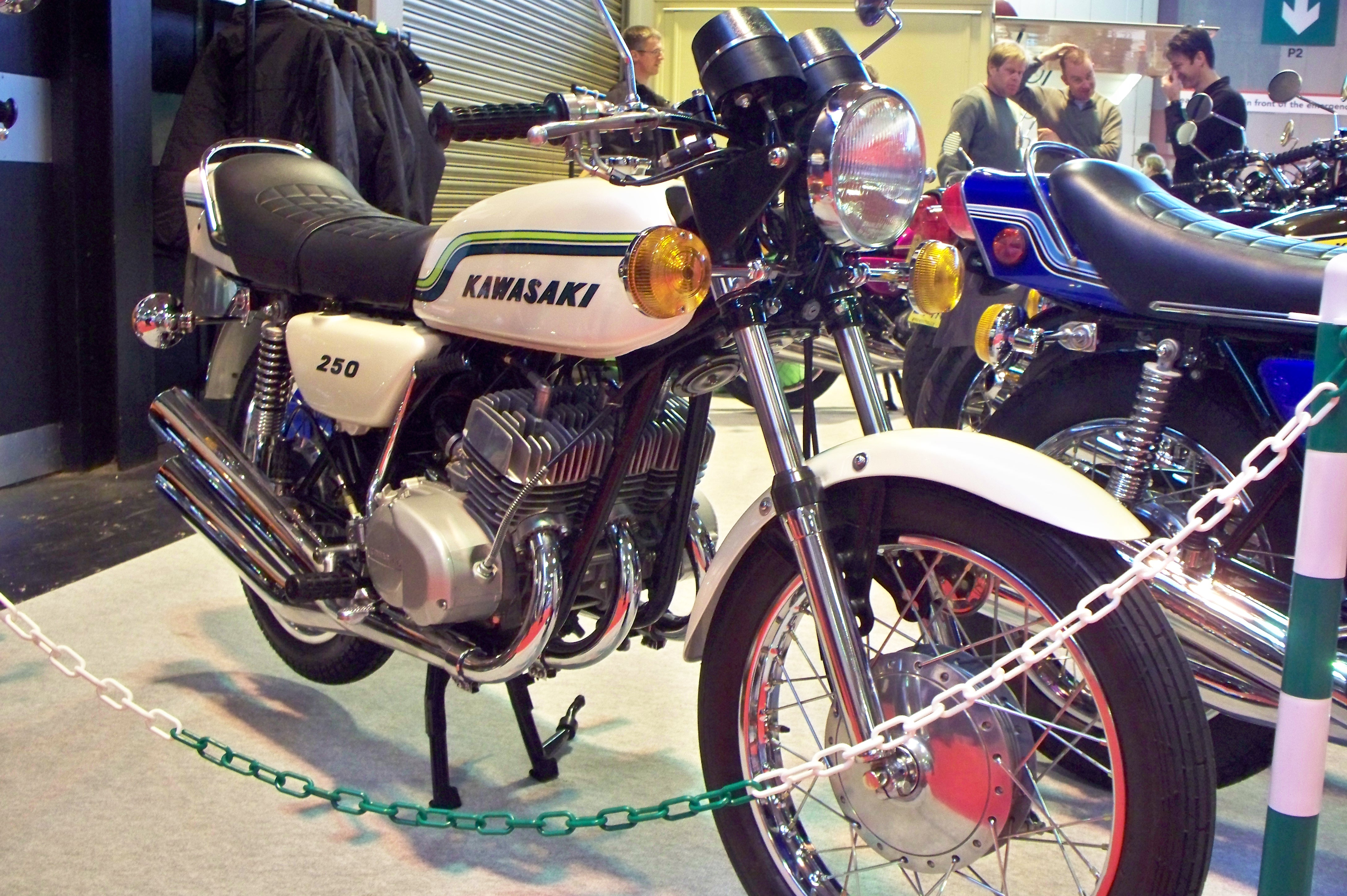
- 1972 Kawasaki S1
- Manufacturer: Kawasaki
- Parent company: Kawasaki Heavy Industries
- Production: 1972-1975
- Predecessor: Kawasaki A1 Samurai
- Successor: Kawasaki KH250
- Class: Standard
- Engine: 249 cc (15.2 cu in) Air-cooled 3-cylinder, two-stroke
- Bore / stroke: 45.0 mm × 52.3 mm (1.8 in × 2.1 in)
- Top speed: 152-154 km/h (95-96 mph)
- Power: (1972)32bhp at 8,000 rpm -(1974)28 bhp (33.5 kilowatts) at 7,500 rpm
- Torque: 30.7 lb-ft at 7000 rpm
- Transmission: Chain driven 5-speed, 1 down-4 up pattern
- Suspension: Inner spring telescopic front fork, three-position spring preload adjustable shock absorber and swing arm (rear)
- Rake, trail: 62°, 4.3 in (110 mm)
- Wheelbase: 54inch
- Dimensions: L: 79,5inch W: 32,3inch
- Seat height: 31,5inch
- Weight: 339lb149.5 kg (330 lb) (dry); 348lb 160 kg (350 lb) (wet)
- Fuel capacity: 14 L (3.2 gallon)
- Related: Kawasaki S2 Mach II, Kawasaki H1 Mach III, Kawasaki H2 Mach IV

The Kawasaki Mach I (model designation S1) was a 250 cc (15 cu in) Kawasaki motorcycle made 1972 through 1975.

== History ==
The Mach I was a direct result of the widespread success of the Kawasaki H1 Mach III 500 cc introduced in 1969. The Mach I's engine was a three-cylinder two-stroke with an engine displacement of 249 cc (15.1 cubic inches) which produced 32 bhp at 8,000 rpm, a power-to-weight ratio of 1 hp (0.75 kW) to every 11.8 pounds. The S1 Mach I replaced the twin Kawasaki A1 Samurai 250 with its twin-cylinder, Kawasaki rotary disc valve engine which produced 31 hp (23 kW) at 8,000 rpm.

The S1 Mach I emerged nearly one year after its bigger brother, the S2 Mach II 350, and from the development success of the Kawasaki H1 Mach III. It was essentially the same motorcycle as its larger brother with less displacement. It had a separate handlebar holder and steering friction damper. Its successor, the KH250, was essentially the same bike with a different name, was marketed from 1976 to 1981.
