= Kawasaki S2 Mach II =

- Manufacturer: Kawasaki
- Parent company: Kawasaki Heavy Industries
- Production: 1972-1974 model years
- Predecessor: 350 cc Kawasaki A7 Avenger
- Successor: 400 cc Kawasaki S3 Mach II
- Class: Standard
- Engine: 346 cc (21.1 cu in) Air-cooled 3-cylinder, two-stroke, piston port
- Bore / stroke: 53.0 mm × 52.3 mm (2.1 in × 2.1 in)
- Compression ratio: 7.3:1 measured from upper side of exhaust port crankpins at 120°
- Transmission: Chain driven 5-speed (5 up) 2.86-1,79-1,35-1,12-0.96 :1
- Frame type: Double cradle (tubular)
- Suspension: Front: inner spring telescopic front fork Rear: swing arm with twin three-position preload spring shock absorbers
- Rake, trail: 62°, 109 mm (4.3 in)
- Wheelbase: 1,330 mm (52 in)
- Dimensions: L: 2,010 mm (79 in); W: 1,095 mm (43.1 in)
- Seat height: 800 mm (31 in)
- Fuel capacity: 14 L (3.1 imp gal; 3.7 US gal)
- Related: Kawasaki S1 Mach I, Kawasaki H1 Mach III, Kawasaki H2 Mach IV

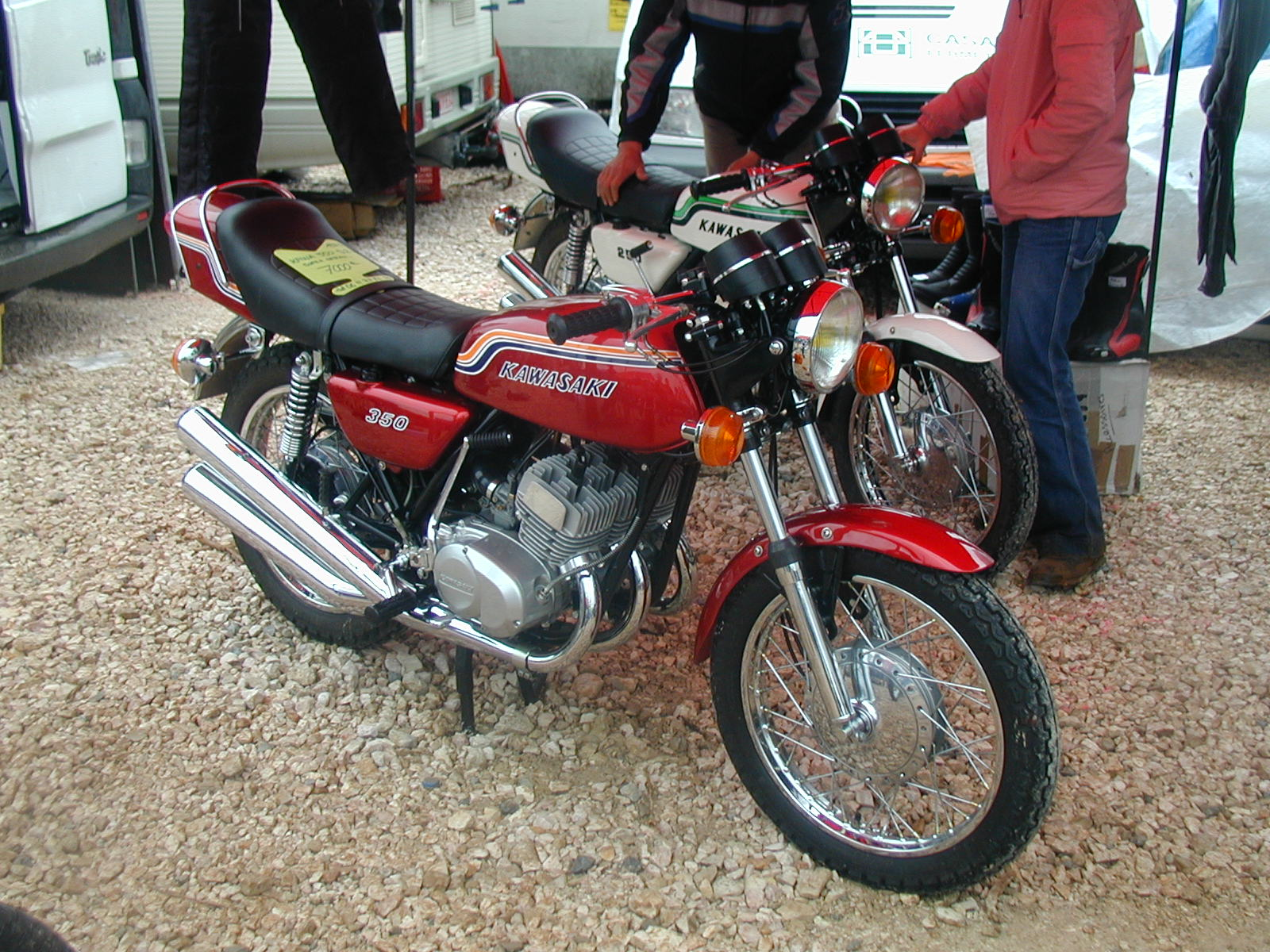
Kawasaki S2

The S2 Mach II is a 350 cc Kawasaki motorcycle introduced for the 1972 model year and discontinued at the end of the 1974 model year. It had a topspeed, with red and white race faring. In 1976/77, on her clock of more then 200km. It has a 3-cylinder two-stroke engine with a displacement of 346 cc (21.1 cu in), and superseded the rotary disc valve twin-cylinder Kawasaki A7 Avenger.
