= Kawasaki H2 Mach IV =

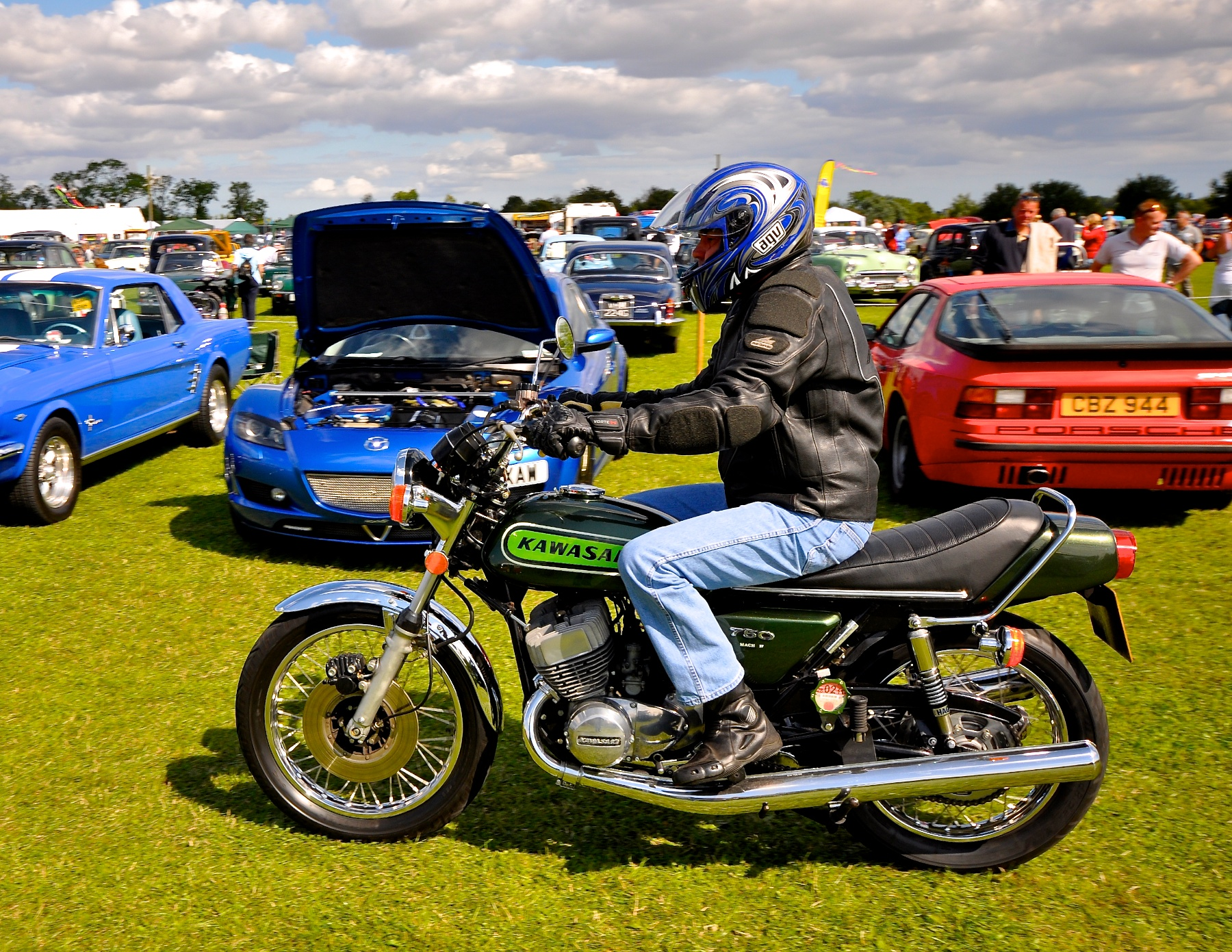
- Manufacturer: Kawasaki Motors
- Parent company: Kawasaki Heavy Industries
- Production: 1972–1975
- Predecessor: None
- Successor: Kawasaki Z750
- Class: Standard street
- Engine: 748 cc (45.6 cu in) Air-cooled, oil injected, 3-cylinder, transverse, two-stroke
- Bore / stroke: 71.0 mm × 63.0 mm (2.80 in × 2.48 in)
- Compression ratio: 7.3:1
- Top speed: 190 km/h (120 mph)
- Power: 55 kW (74 hp) @ 6800 rpm (claimed)
- Torque: 77.4 N⋅m (57.1 lbf⋅ft) @ 6500 rpm (claimed)
- Transmission: Chain driven, 5-speed 5up
- Frame type: Double tubular steel cradle
- Suspension: Front: Telescopic hydraulic forks, three-position spring preload adjustable Rear: Dual shock absorber
- Brakes: Front: Single disc Rear: Drum brake
- Rake, trail: 62°, 114mm
- Wheelbase: 1,410 mm (56 in)
- Seat height: 800 mm (31.5 in)
- Weight: 205 kg (452 lb) (dry)
- Fuel capacity: 17 L (3.7 imp gal; 4.5 US gal)
- Related: Kawasaki S1 Mach I, Kawasaki S2 Mach II, Kawasaki H1 Mach III

The Kawasaki H2 Mach IV is a 750 cc 3-cylinder two-stroke production motorcycle manufactured by Kawasaki. The H2 was a Kawasaki triple sold from September 1971 through 1975.

A standard, factory produced H2 was able to travel a quarter mile from a standing start in 12.0 seconds. It handled better than the Mach III that preceded it. By the standards of its time, its handling was sufficient to make it the production bike to beat on the race track. Nonetheless, its tendency to pull wheelies and a less than solid feel through high speed corners led to adjustments to the design as it evolved. More than any other model, it created Kawasaki's reputation for building what motorcycle journalist Alastair Walker called, "scarily fast, good-looking, no holds barred motorcycles", and led to a further decline in the market place of the British motorcycle industry.

== History ==
In September 1971 the H2 was a direct result of the success of the 500 cc Kawasaki H1 Mach III introduced in 1969. The H2 engine was a 3-cylinder two-stroke with an engine displacement of 748 cc (45.6 cubic inches) which produced 74 horsepower (55 kW) at 6,800 rpm, a power-to-weight ratio of 1 hp (0.75 kW) to every 5.7 lb (2.6 kg) of weight. This made it the fastest accelerating motorcycle in production. This was an entirely new engine and not a bored-out 500. Unlike the H1 500, the 750 had much more low engine speed torque, with a strong burst of power starting at 3,500 rpm to the 7,500 rpm red line.

The 1972 H2 came with a single front disc brake, a second disc brake was an optional Kawasaki part, an all-new capacitor discharge ignition system unique to the H2, a chain oiler, and two steering dampers; one friction and one hydraulic.

In 1973, there were minor mechanical changes made to the carburetor jets, oil injection pump and cylinder port timing in an effort by the factory to get more MPG from the H2A. Because of these changes the most powerful H2 was the 1972 model.

In 1974 the H2B engine was modified for more civilized performance at the expense of raw power. The race tail was slimmed down from the previous year. An oil-based steering damper and check valve were added. The power was reduced to 71 horsepower (53 kW) at 6,800 rpm. The oil injection system was substantially changed with two separate sets of injection lines, unlike the earlier models with one set of lines. Oil was injected into the carburetors on a separate line. The oil injection to the bottom end bearings (both main and rod big ends) was retained as a single branched line. A longer swingarm improved stability. The final model had a weight of 208 kilograms (459 lb).

The H2B and H2C had the steering damper repositioned to the left.

In 1972, the H2, as well as the 350 cc S2 Mach II, had a race tail that held the taillight, and had a small storage space.

== Motorsport competition ==
The American Motorcyclist Association (AMA) introduced its first official road racing category for production class motorcycles as a support class in 1975, which served as the precursor to the AMA Superbike Championship. An H2 Mach IV motorcycle ridden by Yvon Duhamel won the Production Class at the 1975 Pocono National, marking the last time that a two-stroke motorcycle won a production class race at an AMA road racing event.

Kawasaki developed a racing derivative of the H2 called the Kawasaki H2R.

== See also ==
- List of fastest production motorcycles
- List of motorcycles by type of engine
