= American Historic Racing Motorcycle Association =

- Sport: Motorcycle racing
- Jurisdiction: USA
- Abbreviation: AHRMA
- Founded: 1989
- Headquarters: Knoxville, Tennessee

Official website
- www.ahrma.org

The American Historic Racing Motorcycle Association (AHRMA) is a nonprofit organization dedicated to preserving, restoring, and racing old motorcycles.

With over 3,000 members, AHRMA is the leading vintage motorcycle racing group in North America and one of the largest in the world.

== Founding ==
Interest in vintage motorcycle racing took root in the late 1970s as different groups and individuals began to organize races on a regional basis. Road racing was the first type of competition to appear, spearheaded in the Northeast by Robert Iannucci and Jeffrey Elghanayan. In the Southeast, Bob and Marrie Barker and Will Harding launched the Historic Motorcycle Racing Association (HMRA). Other groups also began emerging around the nation, adding motocross, trials, flat-track and concours events to the competition options available for vintage riders. In the West, Fred Mork, Dick Mann and Mike Green were nurturing the California Vintage Racing Group (CVRG).

By 1986, it was clear that a national organization would be necessary to administer and unify the expansion of the sport. AHRMA was originally formed as a privately held business corporation, while other groups were brought together under one banner and one set of rules. In 1989, AHRMA was reorganized into the current member-owned not-for-profit association. Tom McGill, Mike Smith, Beno Rodi, Jeff Elghanyan, Gary Winn, the American Motorcyclist Association, Daytona International Speedway, the Championship Cup Series, BMW of North America, and the American Motorcycle Institute are some who have contributed greatly toward AHRMA's success.

== Organization ==
AHRMA is governed by a 12-member Board of Trustees, six from east of the Mississippi River and six from west of the Mississippi, elected from and by the membership. Trustees serve three-year terms and may be reelected any number of times.

== Disciplines ==
AHRMA offers vintage National and regional road racing, motocross, flat track, observed trials and cross country competition. The classic machines active in AHRMA events span a full 70 years, from the 1920s to the early 1990s. The national-championship schedule typically includes at least 15 rounds in each competition discipline. AHRMA Nationals take place at some of the finest and most historic venues in the United States such as Road America, Willow Springs, Heartland Motorsports Park, New Jersey Motorsports Park and Barber Motorsports Park.

Older vehicles from the 1930s to 1970s, often considered the "golden age of road racing", often draw the fewest numbers due to their low availability. Despite this, AHRMA promised to present venues to showcase these early motorcycles, no matter how few.

=== AHRMA Vintage Motocross ===
Motocross competition is split into two series. Vintage motocross for machines up to 1974 (with a few exceptions allowed to 1976 if the bike didn't change) which is us usually run on the Saturday of events. Classes cater for all age groups through to the 70+ classes. The second is Post-Vintage motocross which is for machines from 1975 through to the mid 1980s. This event is usually run on a Sunday as many riders compete both days on different machines.

=== AHRMA Flat Track ===
Class C, Brakeless, vintage and Seventies-era classes are all catered for in this form of American Motorcycling that has been around since the early days. . America is the main country in which this sport is practiced, with the only racing anything like it being Speedway which is mainly raced in the UK, Australia and New Zealand.

=== AHRMA Observed Trials ===
Observed Trials competition caters for all vintage and historic Trials motorcycles up to the year 1979. Competitors compete on styles of machinery from Girder fork models through the late 1070's twin shocks, always on period based sections to suit the machinery in use.

=== AHRMA Cross Country ===
In the spirit of the ISDT type events and Hare Scrambles of old, AHRMA Cross Country events provide a closed course event reminiscent of what is probably the oldest form of motorcycle sport. Competition is run for both vintage and post-vintage machinery for all skill levels of riders.
