= Kawasaki Ninja ZX-12R =

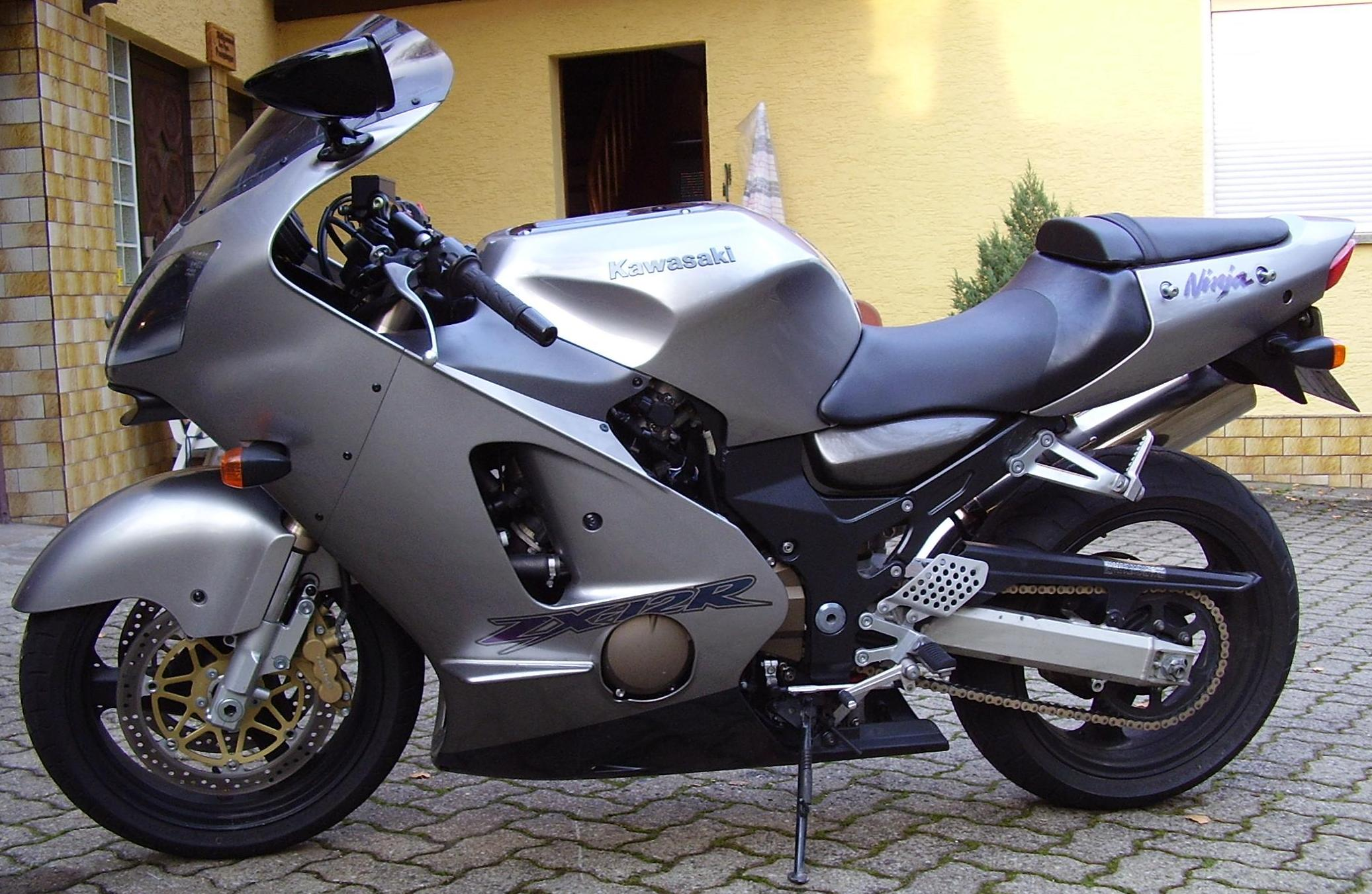
- Manufacturer: Kawasaki Motorcycle & Engine Company
- Parent company: Kawasaki Heavy Industries
- Production: 2000–2006
- Successor: Kawasaki Ninja ZX-14
- Class: Sportbike
- Engine: 1,199 cc (73.2 cu in) four-stroke, liquid-cooled, 16-valve DOHC, inline-four
- Bore / stroke: 83.0 mm × 55.4 mm (3.27 in × 2.18 in)
- Compression ratio: 12.2:1
- Top speed: 301 km/h (187 mph)
- Power: 133.1 kW (178.5 hp) @ 9,500 rpm (claimed); 120.2–121.3 kW (161.2–162.7 hp) (rear wheel)
- Torque: 137 N⋅m (101 lb⋅ft) @ 7,500 rpm (claimed); 123.7 N⋅m (91.2 lb⋅ft) (rear wheel)
- Transmission: 6-speed sequential manual, chain-drive, wet-clutch (18/46 gearing)
- Frame type: Aluminum monocoque
- Suspension: Front: 43 mm KYB, Inverted telescopic fork, with adjustable preload, 12-way rebound and 12-way compression damping (4.72 in.) wheel travel Rear: Bottom-Link with gas-charged shock: piggy-back reservoir, adjustable spring preload, 18-way rebound and 20-way compression (5.51 in.) wheel travel
- Brakes: Front: Dual semi-floating 320 mm (13 in) discs with dual 6-piston tokico calipers Rear: Single 230 mm (9.1 in) disc with opposed 2-piston caliper
- Tires: Dunlop Sportmax II D207; Front: 120/70ZR17; Rear: 200/50ZR17
- Rake, trail: 23.5°, 93 mm (3.66 in)
- Wheelbase: 1,440 mm (56.69 in)
- Dimensions: L: 2,080 mm (81.89 in); W: 720 mm (28.5 in); H: 1,185 mm (46.65 in)
- Seat height: 810 mm (31.9 in)
- Weight: 210 kg (463 lb) (dry); 247 kg (545 lb) (wet)
- Fuel capacity: 20 L; 4.4 imp gal (5.3 US gal)
- Oil capacity: 2,800 ml (2.96 US qt) oil & filter change 3,600 ml (3.8 US qt) completely dry
- Fuel consumption: 7.3 L/100 km; 38.6 mpg_{‑imp} (32.1 mpg_{‑US})
- Turning radius: 3.0 m (9.8 ft)
- Related: Kawasaki Ninja ZX-6R; Kawasaki Ninja ZX-7R; Kawasaki Ninja ZX-9R; Kawasaki Ninja ZX-10R

The Kawasaki Ninja ZX-12R is a motorcycle in the Ninja sport bike series made by Kawasaki from 2000 through 2006. The 1,199 cc (73.2 cu in) inline-four engine produced 178 hp (133 kW) at low speed, and increased to 190 hp (140 kW) at high speed due to its ram-air intake, making it the most powerful production motorcycle up to 2006 and the release of the ZX-14.

It was a contender to be the fastest production motorcycle, and played a role in bringing to a truce the escalating competition to build an ever-faster motorcycle. Its top speed was electronically limited to 186 mph (300 km/h), tying it with the Suzuki Hayabusa and Kawasaki Ninja ZX-14 as the fastest production motorcycle on the market, after the 303–312 km/h (188–194 mph) 1999 Hayabusa was replaced with a speed-limited version as part of a gentlemen's agreement between motorcycle manufacturers that lasted until the 298–311 km/h (185.4–193.24 mph) 2007 MV Agusta F4 R 312.

== Model designation ==
The ZX-12R was only marketed as a Kawasaki Ninja ZX-12R and not marketed as a Kawasaki ZZ-R1200. Unlike the Kawasaki Ninja ZX-11 also marketed as a ZZ-R1100 and the Kawasaki Ninja ZX-14 also called a ZZ-R1400. A separate bike the Kawasaki ZZ-R1200, built from 2002 to 2005 following the discontinuing of the ZX-11/ZZ-R1100 after 2001 was solely to have this model designation. The ZX-12R's R designation followed the race-replica Kawasaki ZX-6R, ZX-7R, ZX-9R, ZX-10R.

== Top speed limited by agreement ==
From the first year of production, in the 2000 model year, its top speed was restricted by a motorcycle manufacturer gentlemen's agreement that was started in late 1999. This was due to a voluntary gentlemen's agreement that included BMW Motorrad and the Japanese manufacturers, amid fears of government regulation of motorcycle speeds mainly in Europe. Prior to the agreement, with rumors of going 200 mph Kawasaki had planned a world press event to launch their answer to Suzuki's Hayabusa, but the event was abruptly cancelled, and instead the ZX-12R with a revised engine control unit that limited speed to about 300 km/h was released with no fanfare or comment by Kawasaki.

== Performance ==
At its introduction the ZX-12R was Kawasaki's flagship sport bike and a competitor to the Suzuki Hayabusa. Its handling and braking matched the power of the engine resulting in a motorcycle that was docile at low speeds and very easy to handle in heavy traffic, but had strong acceleration. The 1,199 cc (73.2 cu in) displacement engine generated 161.2 hp (120.2 kW) at the rear wheel. Cycle World tested the ZX-12R's 0 to 97 km/h (0 to 60 mph) acceleration at 2.59 seconds. They found an electronically limited top speed of 187 mph (301 km/h), a 97 to 0 km/h (60 to 0 mph) braking distance of 36 m (118 ft), and fuel economy of 32.1 mpg_{‑US} (7.3 L/100 km; 38.6 mpg_{‑imp}). They tested the 0 to 1/4 mi (0 to 402 m) time at 10.04 seconds, reaching 231.39 km/h (143.78 mph). The 1/4 mile result Motorcyclist reported was 9.87 seconds at 235.43 km/h (146.29 mph), and Sport Rider found 9.95 seconds at 232.39 km/h (144.40 mph).

== Monocoque aluminum frame ==
While most sport bikes use an aluminum perimeter frame, the ZX-12R uses a unique monocoque aluminum frame. Described by Cycle World in 2000 as a "monocoque backbone...a single large diameter beam" and "Fabricated from a combination of castings and sheet-metal stampings", this was the first use of this type of frame on a mass-produced production motorcycle. This design surpasses the level of chassis strength and stiffness associated with conventional aluminum perimeter frames. Its intention was also to make the bike narrower, and there by more aerodynamic. The design saves space by housing the battery and incorporating an efficient airbox and a cartridge-type air filter that slides into the frame. It was fuel-injected with four Mikuni 46 mm throttle bodies and was Kawasaki's first fuel-injected sport bike since the 1981–1985 GPZ1100.

== Model history ==
The 2002 model was updated with 140 changes. While some of those changes made the bike easier to launch- such as a heavier crankshaft, a reshaped flywheel, and fuel mapping changes- it had 1.3 hp (0.97 kW) less than the 2000 and 2001 models' 162.7 hp (121.3 kW). It had a revised suspension with stiffer front fork springs and a softer rear shock spring. The front fender had cosmetic changes, and panels were added to the inner fairing below the instruments and bars. The centrally located ram-air intake scoop protruding from the fairing that takes advantage of the higher front air pressure was revised. This intake is integrated into a wider and shorter front cowling from Kawasaki Aerospace Company division, lowering the drag coefficient by one point from 33 to 32. The last update was in 2004, with the addition of radial brakes and more fuel injection changes. The ZX-12R was discontinued in 2006, and was followed by the 2006ZX-14 (ZZR1400) which had a similar monocoque frame.

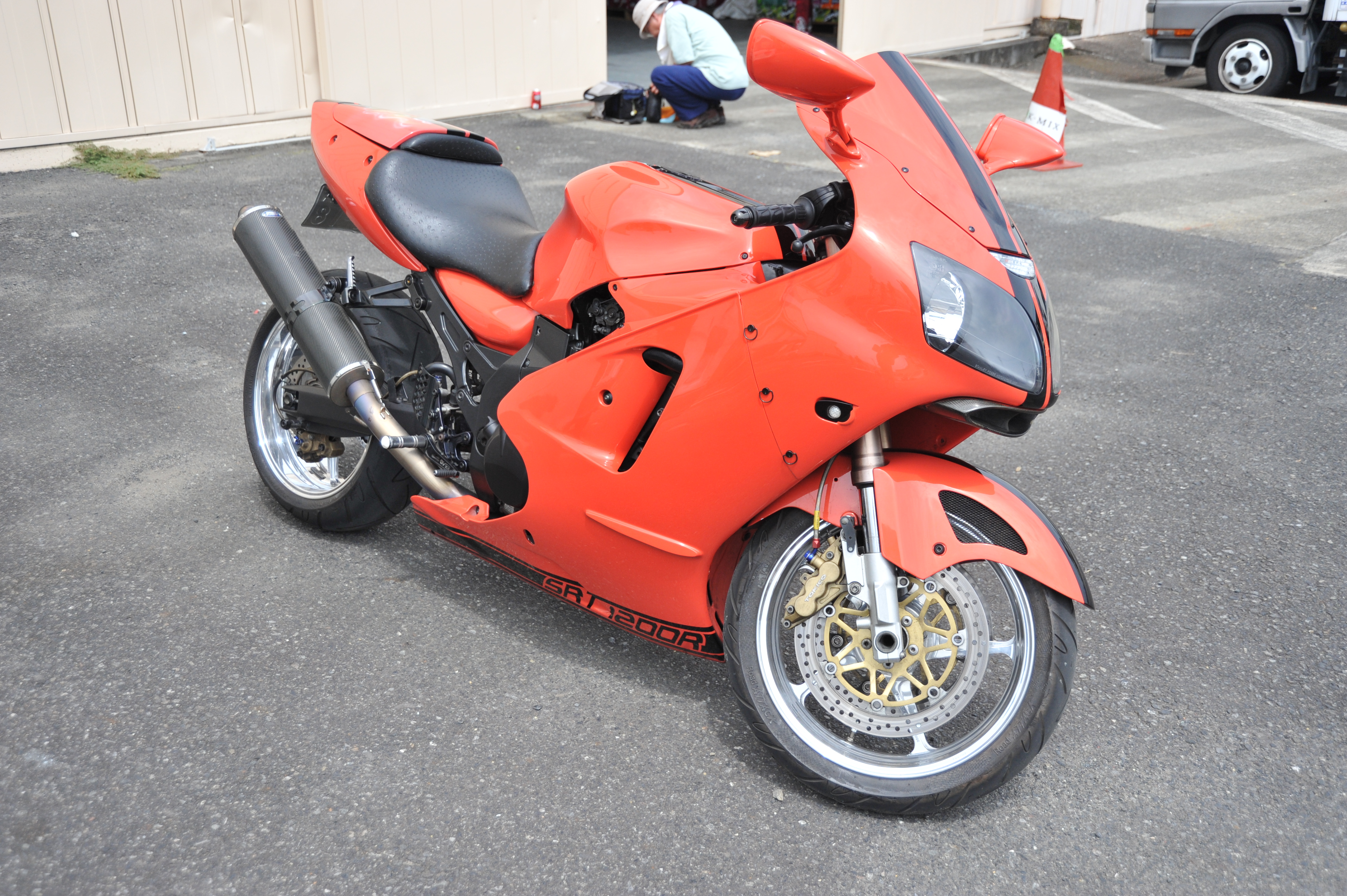
Custom ZX-12R

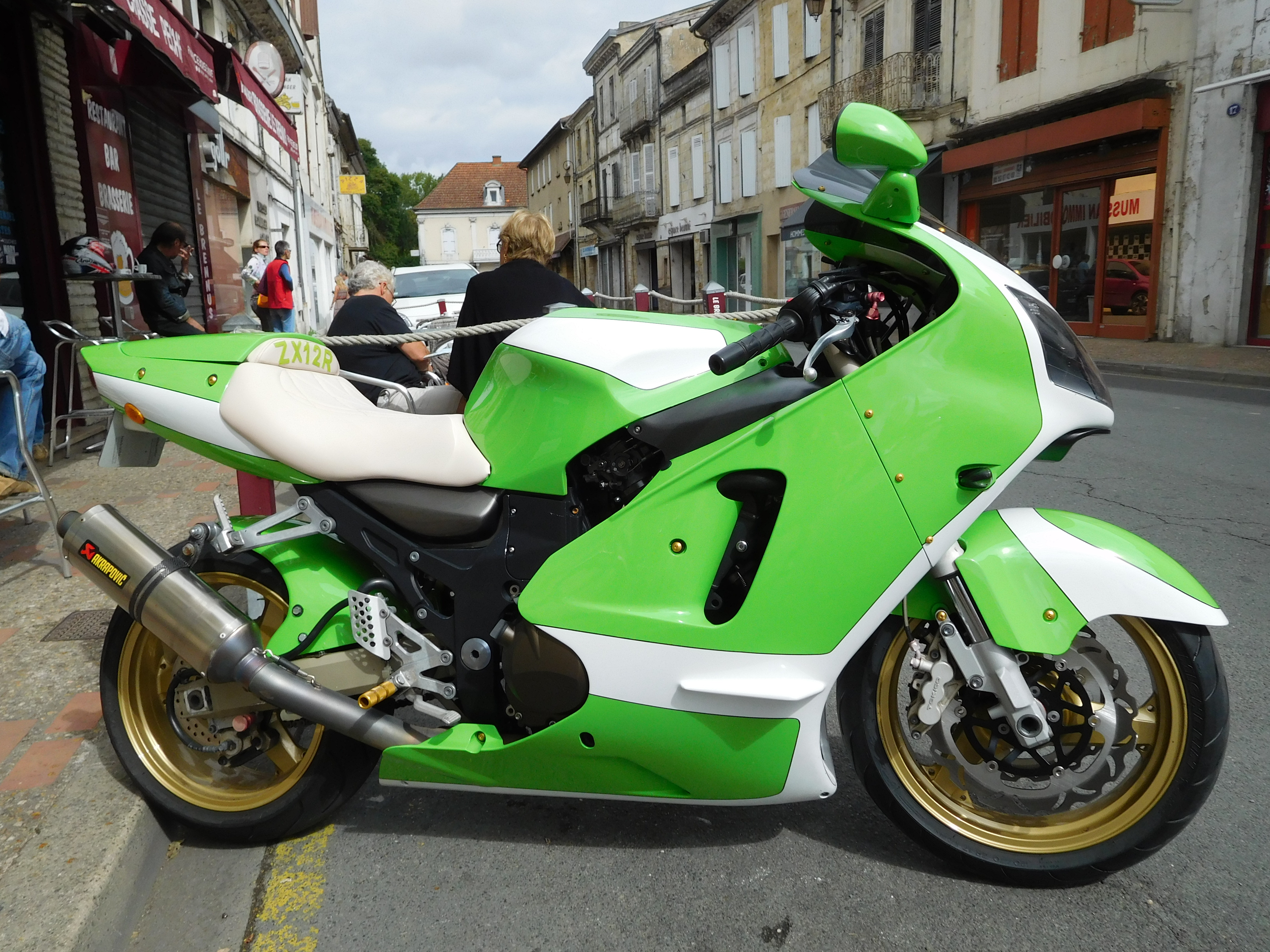
Custom 2001 ZX-12R

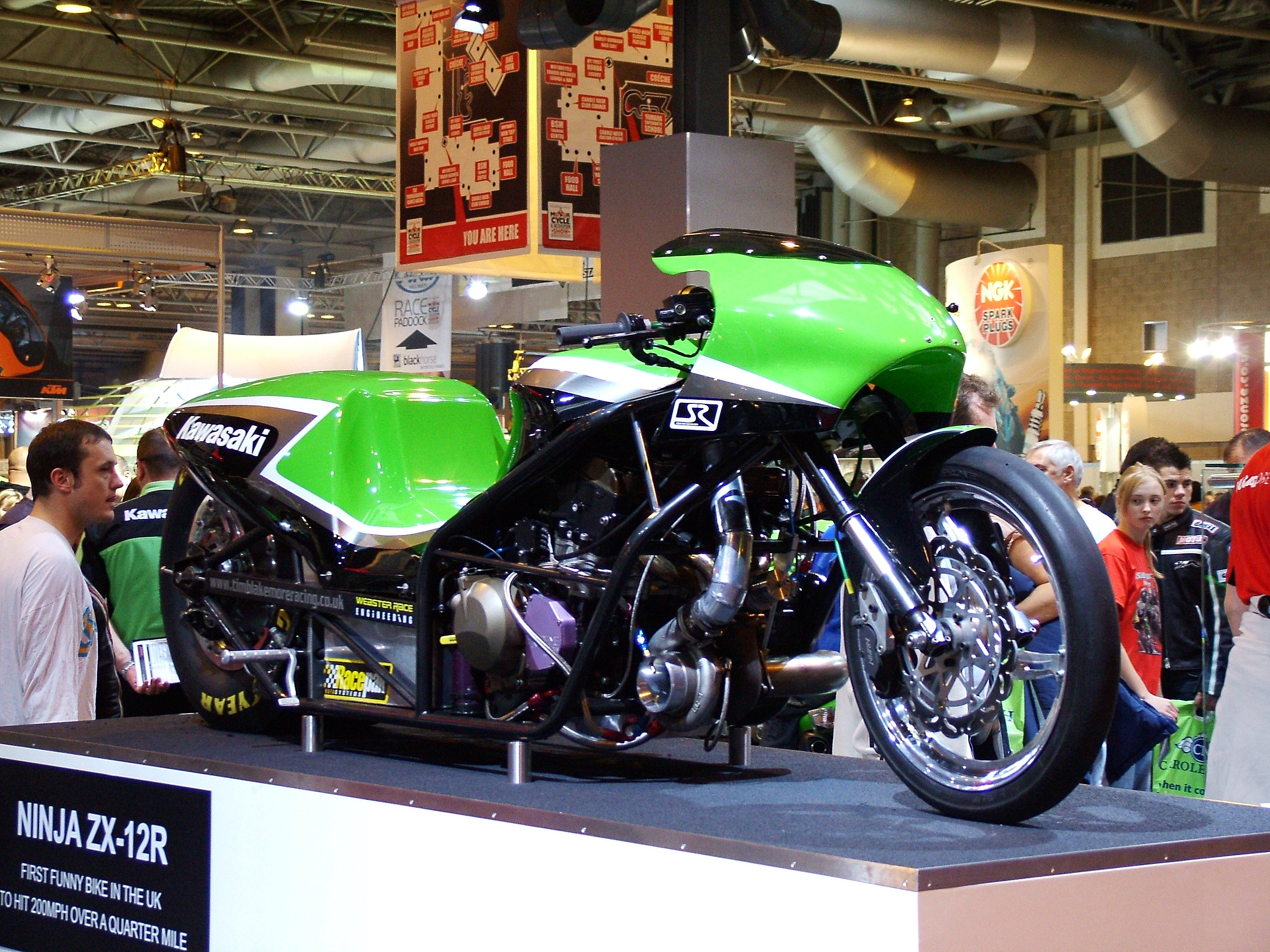
Kawasaki ZX-12R Drag Racer

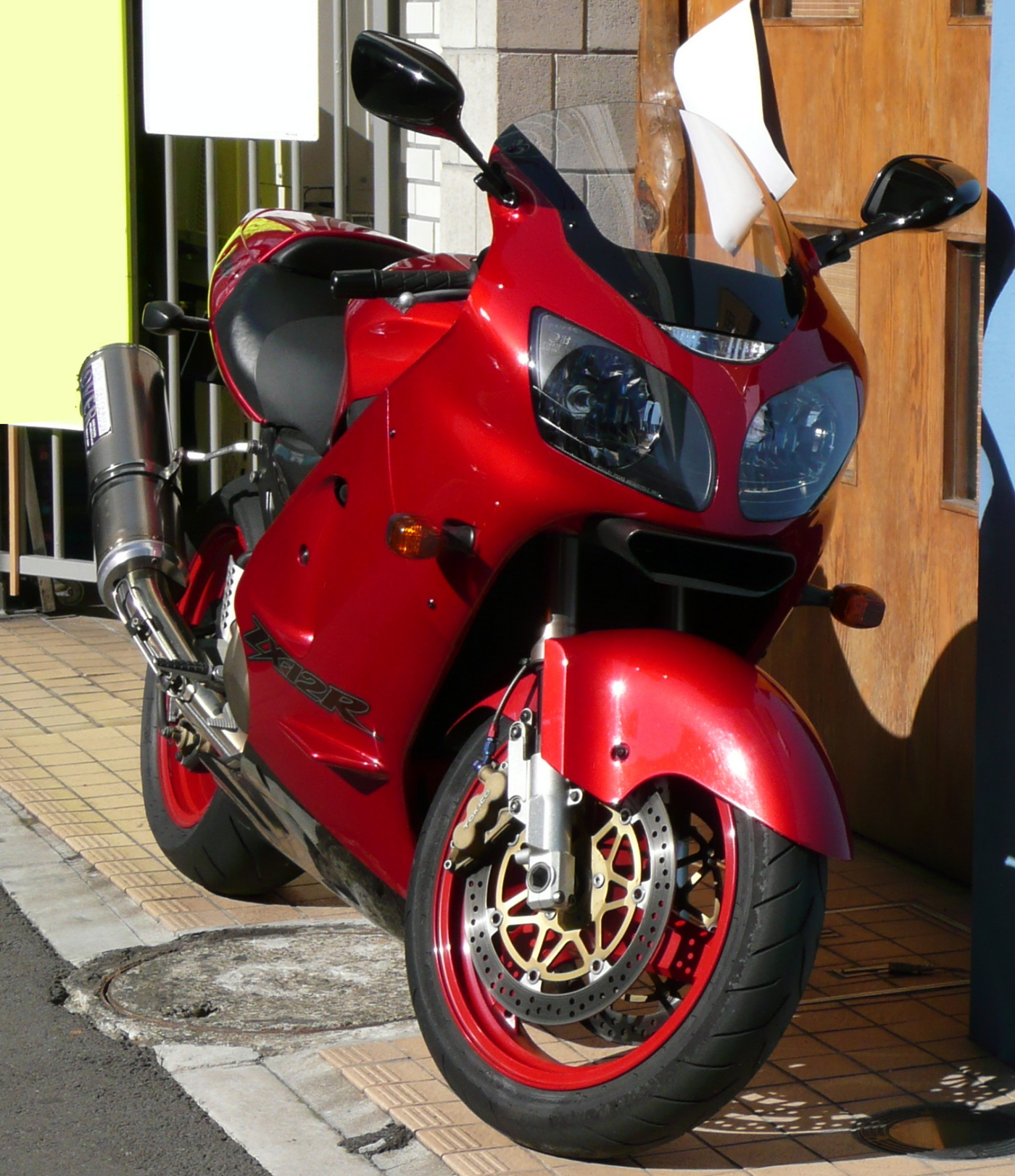
Front view

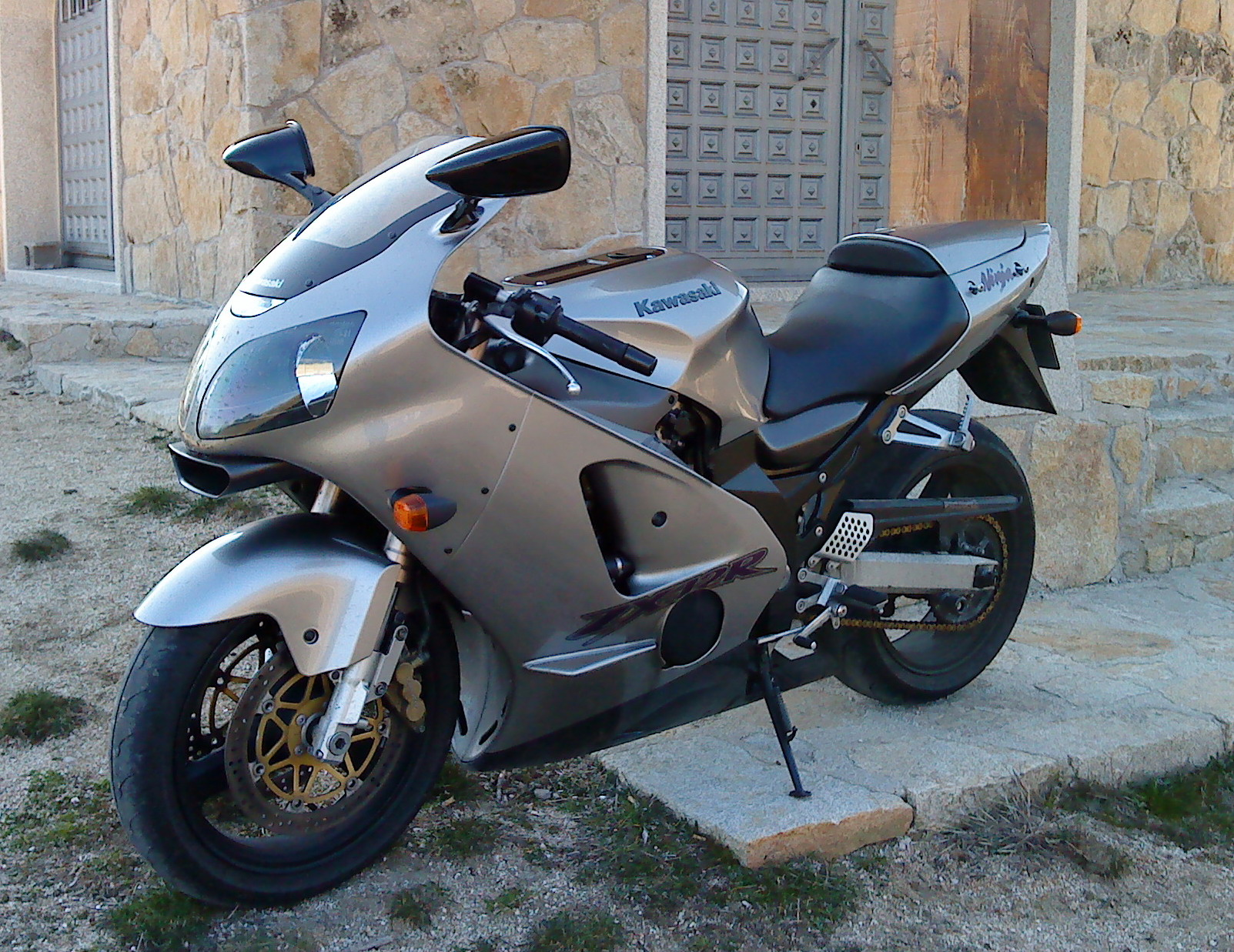
Left side view

== See also ==
- List of fastest production motorcycles by acceleration

Records
Preceded by Suzuki Hayabusa	Fastest production motorcycle 2000-2006^{1}	Succeeded by Kawasaki Ninja ZX-14
Notes and references
1. Fastest in production during its lifetime, but not record holder
