= Kawasaki Ninja ZX-10R =

Sport bike

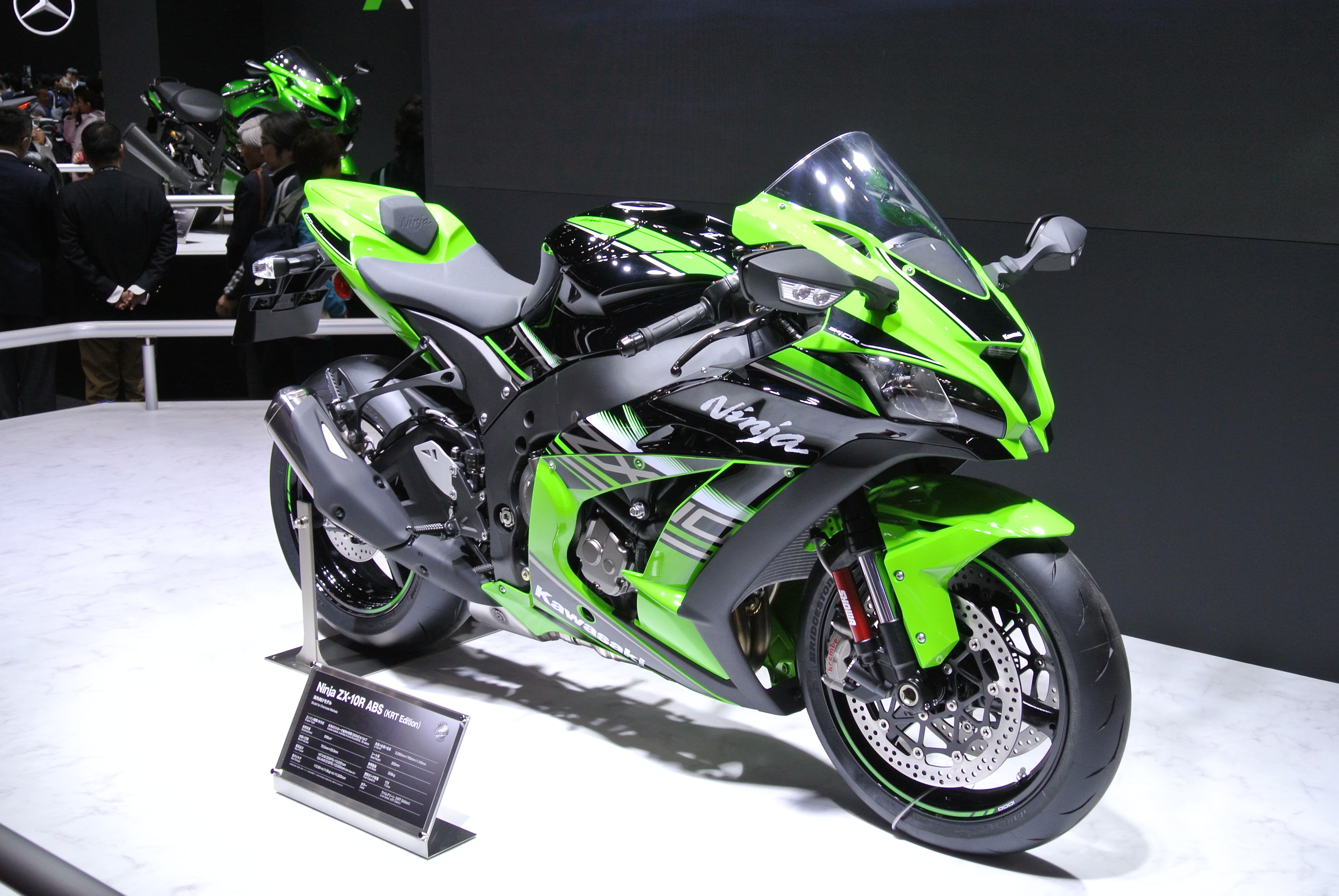
- A 2016 model of the Kawasaki ZX-10R
- Manufacturer: Kawasaki Motorcycle & Engine Company
- Parent company: Kawasaki Heavy Industries
- Production: 2004–present
- Predecessor: Kawasaki Ninja ZX-9R
- Class: Sport bike
- Engine: 998 cc (60.9 cu in) four-stroke, liquid-cooled, 16-valve, DOHC, across the frame
- Related: Kawasaki Ninja ZX-6R; Kawasaki Ninja ZX-7R; Kawasaki Ninja ZX-9R; Kawasaki Ninja ZX-12R

The Kawasaki Ninja ZX-10R is a motorcycle in the Ninja sport bike series from the Japanese manufacturer Kawasaki, the successor to the Ninja ZX-9R. It was originally released in 2004 and has been updated and revised throughout the years. It combines an ultra-narrow chassis, low weight, and radial brakes. In 2004 and 2005 the ZX-10R won Best Superbike from Cycle World magazine, and the international Masterbike competition.

== Components ==
=== Engine ===
Kawasaki engineers used a stacked design for a liquid-cooled, 998 cc (60.9 cu in) inline four-cylinder engine positioned across the frame. The crankshaft axis, input shaft, and output shaft of the Ninja ZX-10R engine are positioned in a triangular layout to reduce engine length, while the high-speed generator is placed behind the cylinder bank to reduce engine width. With a bore and stroke of 76 mm × 55 mm (3.0 in × 2.2 in), the ZX-10R engine's one-piece cylinder, and crankcase assembly reduces weight and increases rigidity. The DOHC are machined from Chromoly steel, built for strength; four valves per cylinder improve high-rpm breathing; and the forged, lightweight pistons offer high heat resistance to further enhance the bike's power-to-weight ratio.

=== Cooling system ===
In addition to liquid cooling, the ZX-10R engine has an oil cooler adjacent to the oil filter to reduce oil temperatures. Slosh analysis was also used to design the internal structure of the oil pan, thereby reducing windage losses and helping to maintain low oil temperatures.

=== Clutch ===
A multi-plate wet slipper clutch transfers power to a six-speed, close-ratio transmission ideal for closed-course competition. The back-torque limiter automatically disengages the clutch (partially) under hard downshifting at high engine speeds to prevent rear-wheel hop during corner entry.

=== Wheels ===
A new six-spoke wheel design is claimed to be almost as light as special purpose race wheels. Since the 2006 model, the sidewall profile of the rear tire has been increased from 190/50/ZR17 to 190/55/ZR17.

== History ==
=== 2004–2005 ===
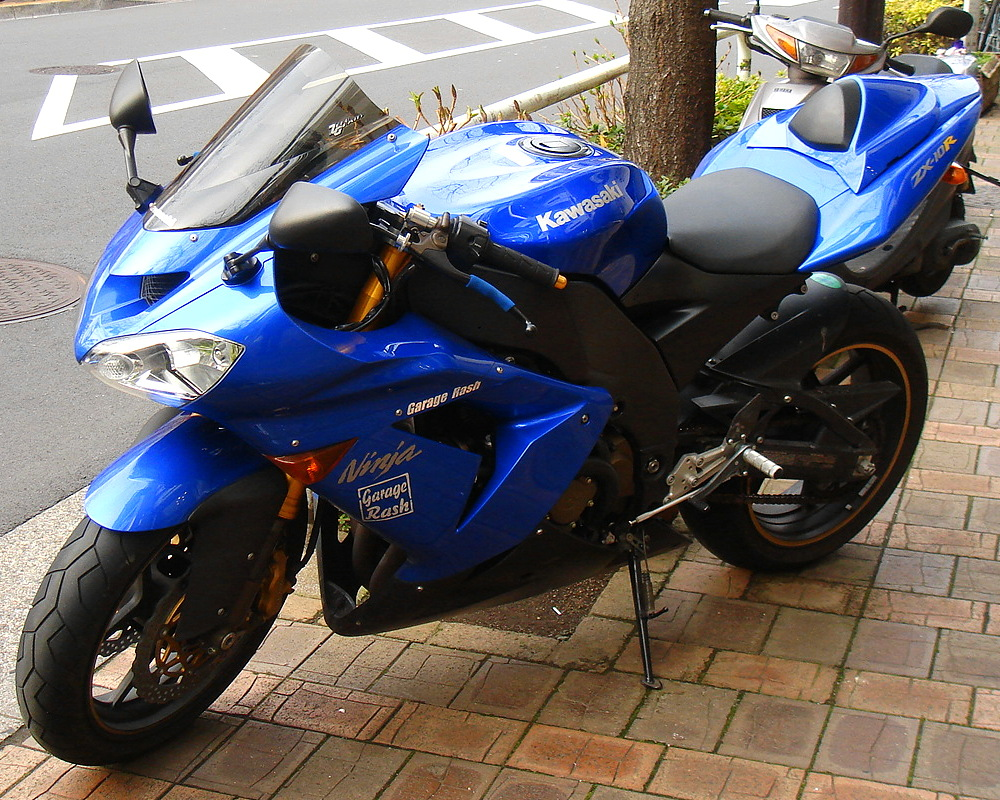
2004 Ninja ZX-10R

The 2004 model was the debut of the Ninja ZX-10R with minor updates in 2005. It was compact, and with a chassis rivaling those of a 600cc sportbike and with a short wheelbase and a high power-to-weight ratio, which helped the handling. The exhaust system was fully titanium with a single muffler.

=== 2006–2007 ===
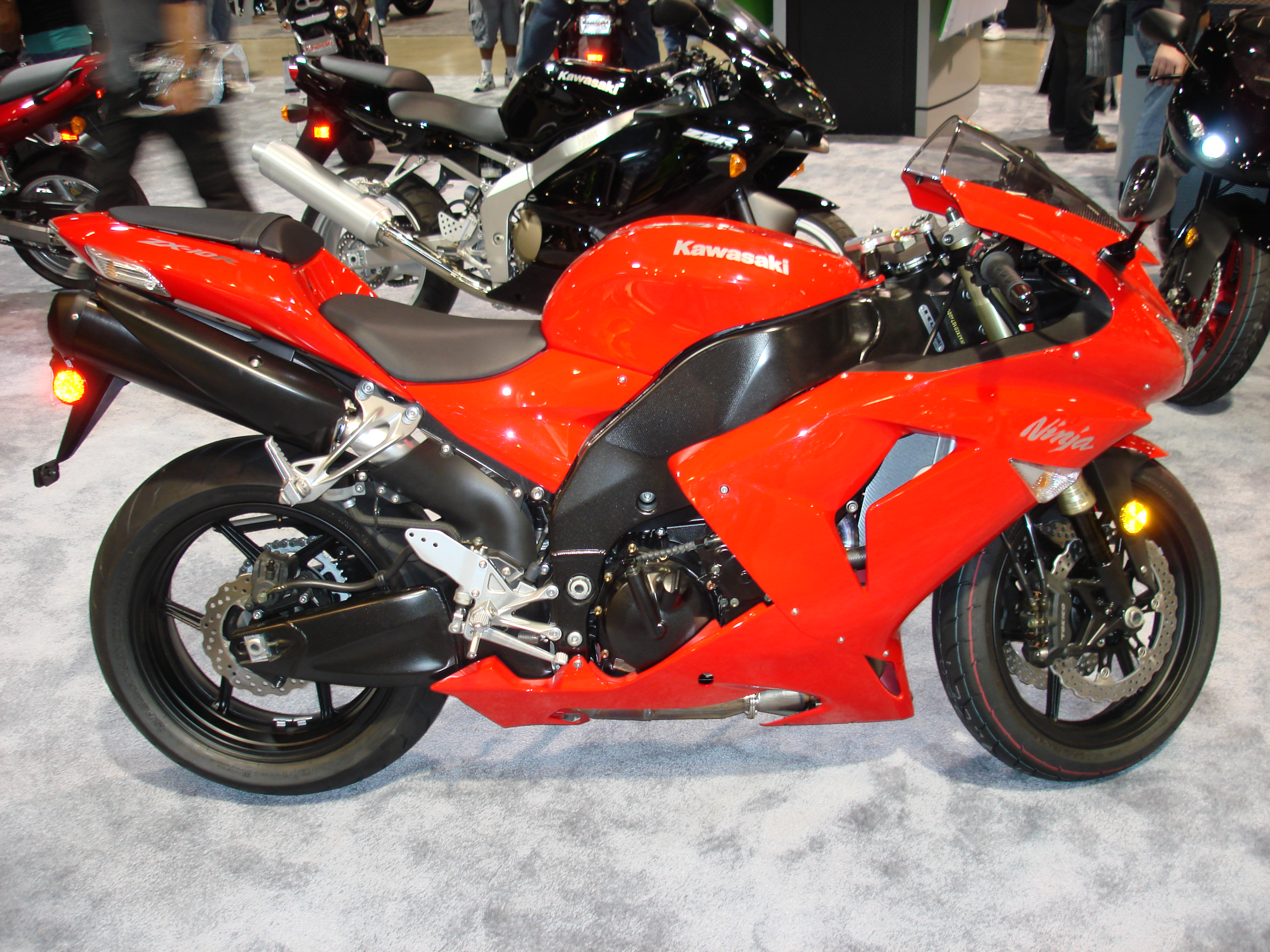
2007 Ninja ZX-10R

Among other changes, the 2006 model had twin underseat exhausts which contributed to a 5 kg (11 lb) increase in dry weight. The engine remained largely unchanged.

=== 2008 ===
The ZX-10R was all new for its launch for the 2008 model year. There was a dramatic change in appearance with the bike with a much more angular front end. Kawasaki moved away from the twin underseat exhausts of the 2006–2007 model to a more conventional single side exhaust. The compression ratio of the engine was raised.

=== 2009 ===
The 2009 model received only slight changes to the transmission from the 2008 model. The shift shaft was upgraded to allow smoother shifts.

=== 2010 ===
The 2010 model received slight changes from the 2009 model, including, upgraded Öhlins steering damper, headlights were recessed into the fairing and the individual fairing centre section pieces where now fused into one moulding.

=== 2011–2015 ===
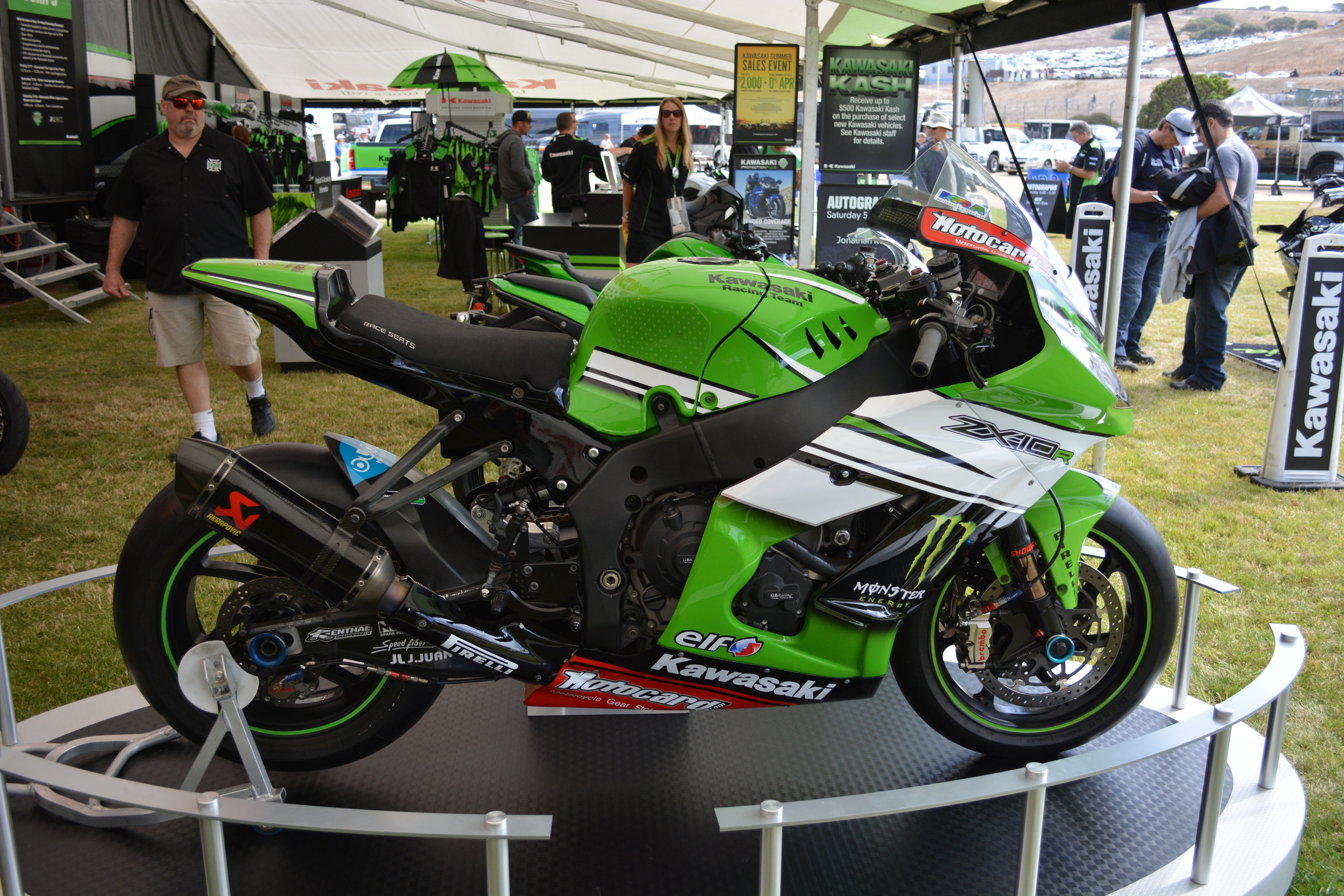
2015 Ninja ZX-10R

The 2011 ZX-10R underwent a major overhaul both mechanically and visually. Most notably, Kawasaki introduced their Sport Kawasaki Traction Control (S-KTRC) system as standard. It predicts when traction will be lost and adapts accordingly. Also new are an ABS option called Kawasaki Intelligent Braking System (KIBS), a completely new design, adjustable foot-pegs, larger throttle bodies, a horizontal rear suspension, lighter three-spoke wheels, Showa Big Piston Fork (BPF) front suspension, and an LCD panel dashboard. The 2012 model is identical to the 2011. In the 2013 models, the front damper was replaced with an Ohlins electronic front steering dampener.

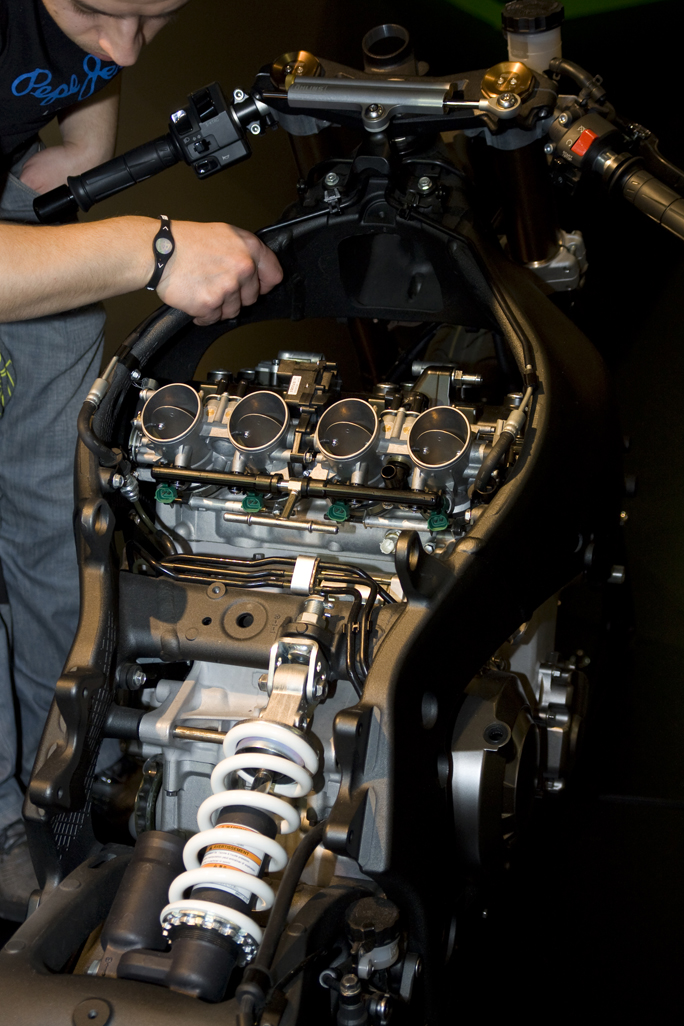
Horizontal rear shock and ram-air passages through the neck of frame

Tom Sykes in 2013 became the first Superbike World Champion for Kawasaki since Scott Russell and the first on a ZX-10R. Stuart Easton won the 2014 Macau Grand Prix. Jonathan Rea won the 2015 Superbike World Championship season. Jeremy Toye holds the Heavyweight (Open) lap record at the Pikes Peak International Hill Climb.

=== 2016 ===
The 2016 ZX-10R received a major update. With a claimed 197 hp with ram-air intake at 13,000 rpm. The electronics now use a Bosch five-axis Internal Measurement Unit (IMU). A sixth degree is calculated by proprietary Kawasaki software. The S-KTRC updated with an added launch control mode, a quickshifter, and engine brake control. Also, optional smarter KIBS cornering ABS. Because of its predictive as opposed to reactive nature, Kawasaki touts this system of S-KTRC as the most advanced of all current traction control systems. Some of the changes mechanically that are now lighter are the slipper clutch, balancer, crankshaft as well as pistons. A less restrictive air filter and larger air box as well as a lighter less restrictive exhaust system. A new transmission that is cassette style is vertically stacked. The previous petal rotors that have been in use since 2004 are now replaced with circular rotors. They are now also larger from 310 mm (12.2 in) to now 330 mm (13.0 in). The calipers are now Brembo M50 Monoblock and the master cylinder is a radial Brembo. The brake lines are now braided stainless-steel. A first for production sport bikes a 43 mm Showa Balance Free Fork derived from WSBK. Kawasaki also offers Race Kit parts for chassis and engine.

=== 2017 ===
Kawasaki released a homologation special, the ZX-10RR with the modified cylinder head. Race-kit parts can be ordered such as high lift cams, DLC coated valve train, a beefed-up crankcase, Marchesini seven-spoke forged aluminum rims, a bi-directional quickshifter, and a single seat. The model was a limited-run of 500 units.

=== 2018–2019 ===
For the 2018 race season, Kawasaki adopted the motto "Ninja Spirit" due to race organisers imposing technical penalties based on Kawasaki's analysed prior successes, resulting in limitations to the maximum revs their engine could achieve in race operation. Kawasaki asserted the new rules would affect their machines more than the other manufacturers, resulting in their reaction: "The spirit of accepting a challenge of striving for on-track excellence, and never giving up.".

In late 2018 Kawasaki released a homologation special run of 500 ZX-10RR machines having a redesigned engine with modifications including finger cam followers that allowed for higher revs and greater power output. This was used by World Superbike riders Jonathan Rea and Leon Haslam during 2019.

=== 2020 ===
Production of the 2020 model year ZX-10R benefited from racing experience, having piston and cylinder head components previously available only on the ZX-10RR.'

=== 2021–present ===
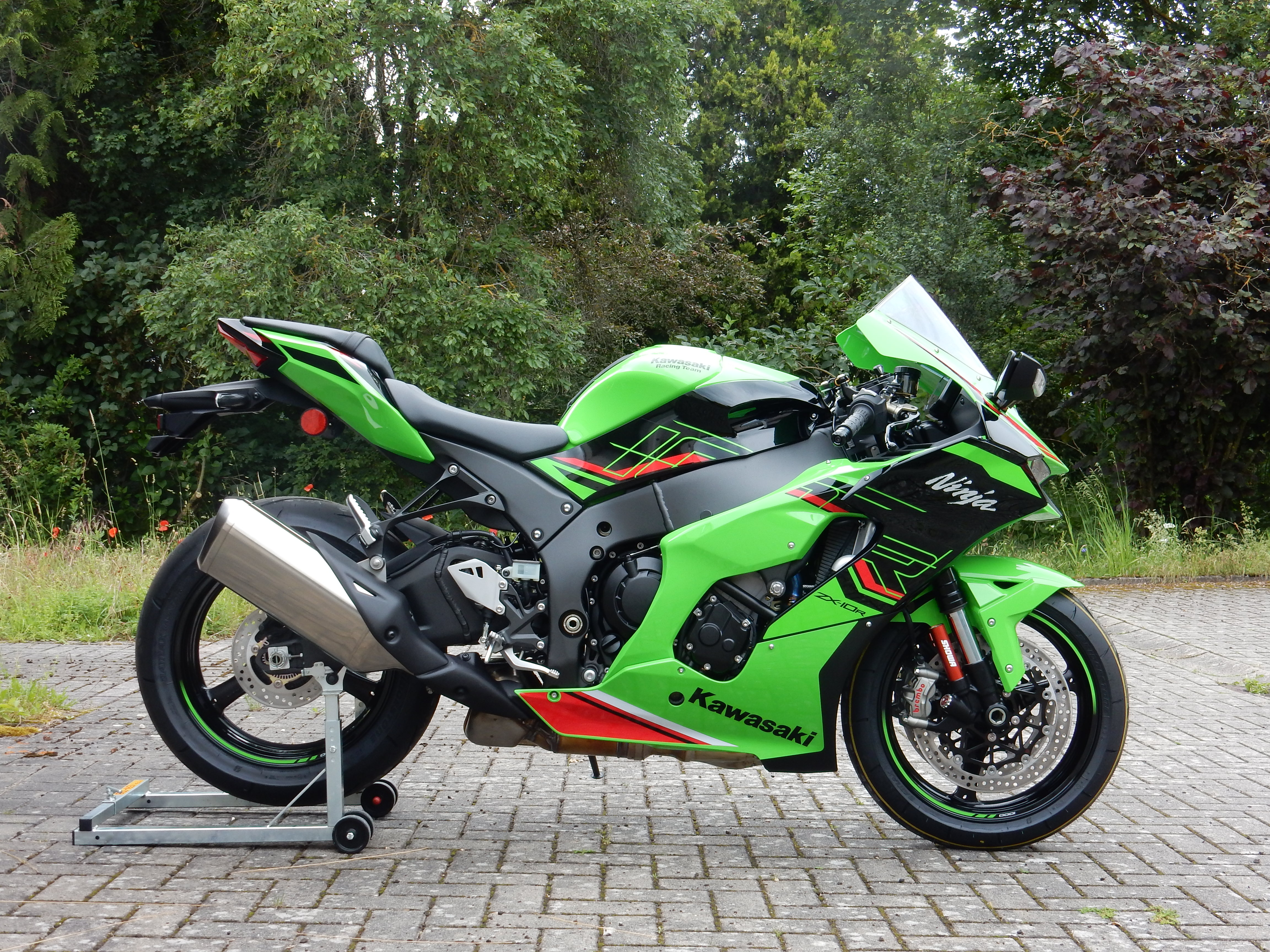
2024 Ninja ZX-10R

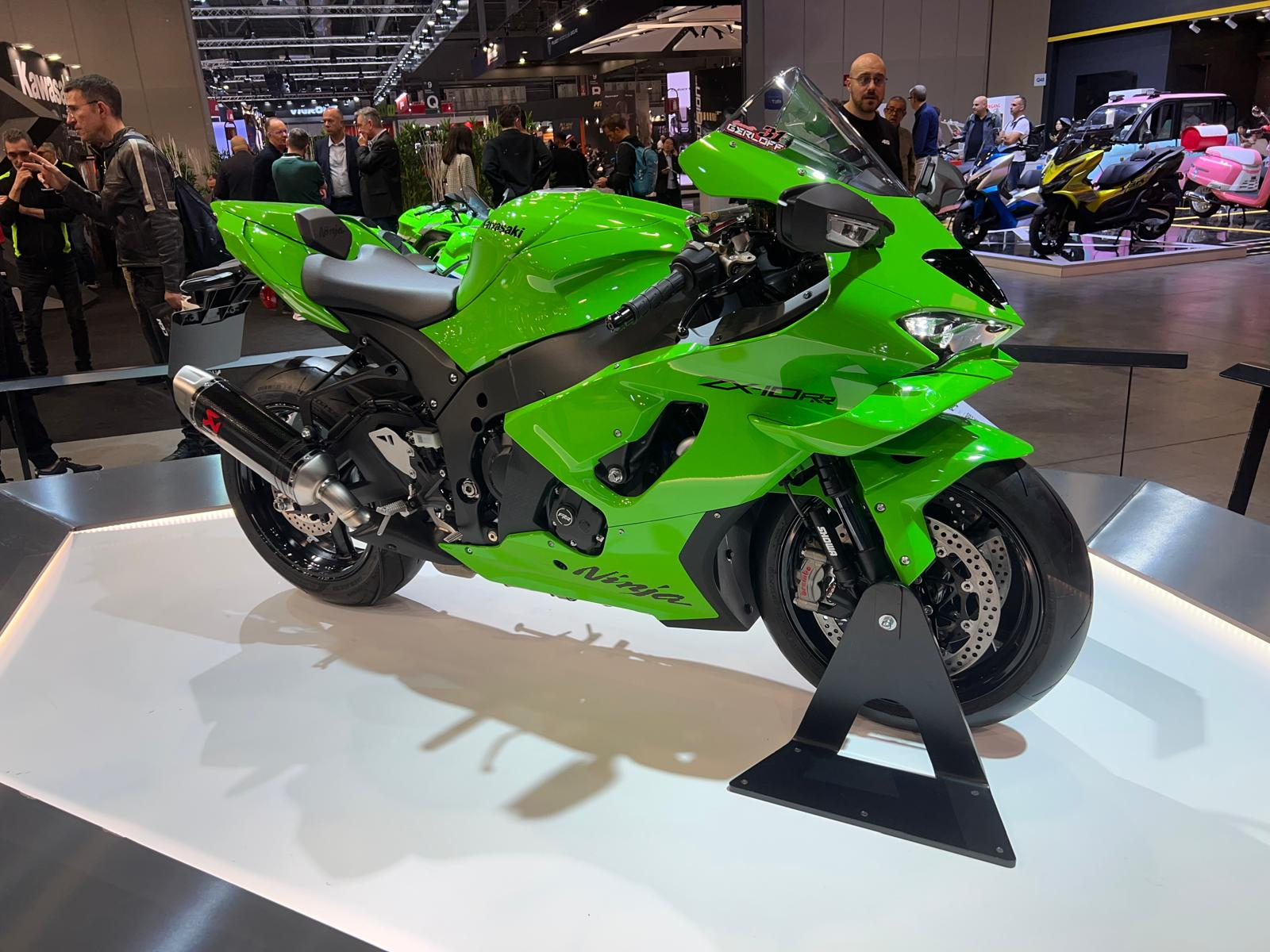
2026 Ninja ZX-10RR

A new oil filter, exhaust system, and throttle valve were fitted for 2021 onwards models.

== Specifications ==
	2004–2005	2006–2007	2008–2009/2010	2011–2015	2016–2020	2021–
Engine	998 cc (60.9 cu in) liquid-cooled inline four-cylinder					
Bore × stroke	76.0 mm × 55.0 mm (2.99 in × 2.17 in)					
Compression ratio	12.7:1		12.9:1	13.0:1		
Valvetrain	DOHC; four valves per cylinder					
Fuel system	Fuel injection					
Ignition	Computer-controlled digital transistorized			TCBI with digital advance and Sport-Kawasaki Traction Control (S-KTRC)		
Power	110.5 kW (148.2 hp) (rear wheel)		116.2 kW (155.8 hp) (rear wheel)@ 12,200 rpm	119.3 kW (160.0 hp) (rear wheel)@ 11,650 rpm	146.9 kW (197.0 hp)@ 13,000 rpm(claimed). 124.5 kW (167.0 hp) @ 11,020 rpm rear wheel	
Torque	103.2 N⋅m (76.1 lb⋅ft) (rear wheel)		97.9 N⋅m (72.2 lb⋅ft) (rear wheel)@ 11,000 rpm	99.5 N⋅m (73.4 lb⋅ft) (rear wheel)@ 11,030 rpm	113.5 N⋅m (83.7 lb⋅ft)@ 11,500 rpm(claimed)103.0 N⋅m (76.0 lb⋅ft)@ 11,200 rpm (rear wheel)	
Drivetrain	Slipper clutch, close-ratio six-speed manual, sealed chain-drive					
Suspension	Front: 43 mm inverted fork with top-out springs Rear: Bottom-Link Uni-Trak with gas-charged shock and top-out spring		Front: 43 mm inverted fork with top-out springs Rear: Uni-Trak with top-out spring, stepless, dual-range (high/low-speed) compression damping.	Front: 43 mm inverted fork with top-out springs (Big Piston Fork Design); Horizontal Back-link with gas-charged shock, stepless, dual-range compression damping, stepless rebound damping	Front: 43 mm inverted Balance Free Fork with external compression chamber fully adjustable Rear:Horizontal back-link with Balance Free gas-charged shock, dual-range fully adjustable	
Brakes	Front: Dual radial-mounted four-piston calipers with semi-floating 300 mm (11.8 in) petal discs Rear: Single 220 mm (8.7 in) disc with single-piston caliper		Dual radial-mounted four-piston calipers with semi-floating 310 mm (12.2 in) petal discs Rear: Single 220 mm (8.7 in) disc with single-piston caliper		Front: Dual semi-floating 330 mm (13.0 in) discs Brembo monobloc M50 radial-mounted four-piston calipers Rear:Single 220 mm (8.7 in) disc with aluminum single-piston caliper	
Tires	Front: 120/70ZR-17; Rear: 190/50ZR-17	Front: 120/70ZR-17; Rear: 190/55ZR-17				
Rake, trail	24°, 102 mm (4.0 in)	24.5°, 102 mm (4.0 in)	25.5°, 110 mm (4.3 in)	25°, 107 mm (4.2 in)		
Wheelbase	1,385 mm (54.5 in)	1,390 mm (55 in)	1,415 mm (55.7 in)	1,425 mm (56.1 in)	1,440 mm (56.7 in)	1,450 mm (57.1 in)
Seat height	825 mm (32.5 in)		830 mm (33 in)	813 mm (32.0 in)	835 mm (32.9 in)	
Dry weight	170 kg (370 lb)	175 kg (386 lb)	179 kg (395 lb) - 2008 Model			
Wet Weight	196 kg (432 lb)	202 kg (445 lb)	208 kg (459 lb) - 2009–2010 Models	202 kg (445 lb)	206.0 kg (454.2 lb)	207.4 kg (457.2 lb)
Fuel capacity	17 L (3.7 imp gal; 4.5 US gal)					
Performance
Top speed	180 mph (290 km/h)				188.9 mph (304.0 km/h)	
0–97 km/h (0–60 mph)	3.12 sec.		2.84 sec.	2.9 sec.	2.8 sec.	
0 to 1/4 mi (0.00 to 0.40 km)	10.02 sec. @ 234.29 km/h (145.58 mph)		10.01 sec. @ 241.48 km/h (150.05 mph)	10.05 sec. @ 234.43 km/h (145.67 mph)	10.07 sec. @ 236.73 km/h (147.10 mph)	
Braking 60 to 0 mph (97 to 0 km/h)	35.2 m (115.5 ft)			37 m (123 ft)	38 m (124 ft)	
Fuel economy	5.6 litres per 100 kilometres; 50 miles per imperial gallon (42 mpg_{‑US})		7.3 litres per 100 kilometres; 38.9 miles per imperial gallon (32.4 mpg_{‑US})	6.4 litres per 100 kilometres; 44 miles per imperial gallon (37 mpg_{‑US})		
