= Kawasaki Ninja ZX-14 =

Kawasaki Ninja ZZR1400
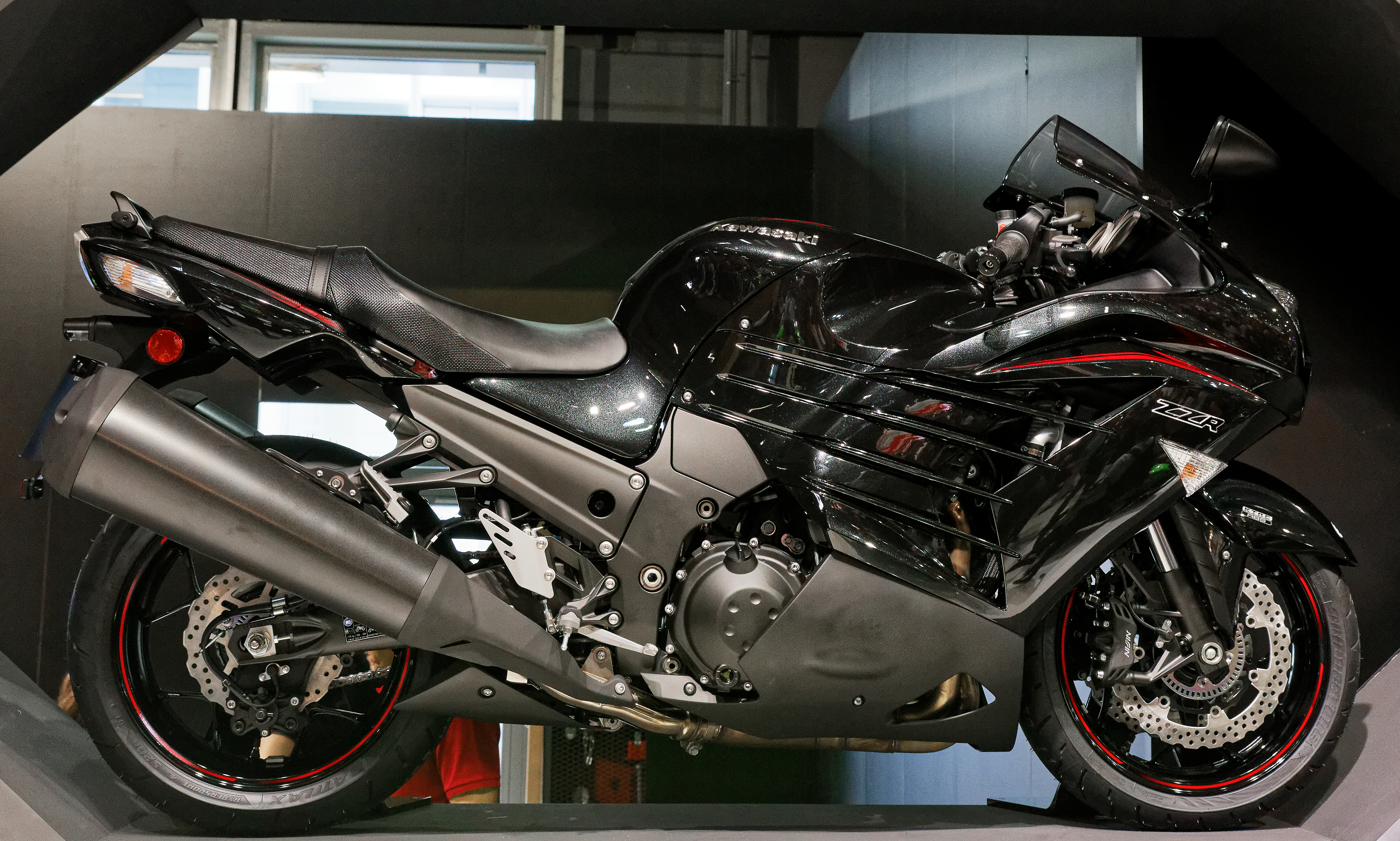
- Manufacturer: Kawasaki Motorcycle & Engine Company
- Also called: Kawasaki ZZR1400; Kawasaki Ninja ZX-14R (2012–present)
- Parent company: Kawasaki motorcycles
- Production: 2006–present
- Predecessor: Kawasaki ZZ-R1200; Kawasaki Ninja ZX-12R
- Class: Sport bike
- Engine: 2006–2011: 1,352 cc (82.5 cu in); 2012–present: 1,441 cc (87.9 cu in) four-stroke, liquid-cooled, 16-valve DOHC, transverse
- Bore / stroke: 84.0 mm × 61.0 mm (3.31 in × 2.40 in); 84.0 mm × 65.0 mm (3.31 in × 2.56 in)
- Compression ratio: 12.0:1
- Top speed: 186 mph (299 km/h)
- Power: 2006-2011: 140 kW (190 hp) (claimed); 121.6–126.9 kW (163.1–170.2 hp) (rear wheel); 2012–present: 155.0 kW (207.9 hp) (claimed); 143.0 kW (191.7 hp) (rear wheel)
- Torque: 2006–2011: 140.7 N⋅m (103.8 lb⋅ft) (rear wheel); 2012–present: 153.5 N⋅m (113.2 lb⋅ft) (rear wheel)
- Transmission: 6-speed sequential manual, X-ring chain
- Frame type: Aluminium monocoque
- Suspension: Front: 43 mm inverted cartridge fork with adjustable preload, stepless rebound and compression damping adjustments / 120 mm (4.6 in) travel Rear: Uni-Trak with adjustable preload, stepless rebound and compression damping adjustments, adjustable ride height / 120 mm (4.9 in) travel
- Brakes: Front: Dual semi-floating 310 mm (12 in) petal discs with dual radial-mounted four-piston calipers Rear: Single 250 mm (9.8 in) petal disc with twin-piston caliper
- Tyres: Front: 120/70 ZR17; Rear: 190/50 ZR17
- Rake, trail: 23 degrees / 94 mm (3.7 in)
- Wheelbase: 1,480 mm (58.3 in)
- Dimensions: L: 2,170 mm (85.4 in); W: 760 mm (29.9 in); H: 1,170 mm (46.1 in)
- Seat height: 800 mm (31.5 in)
- Weight: 269 kg (593 lb) (wet)
- Fuel capacity: 22 L (4.8 imp gal; 5.8 US gal)
- Related: Kawasaki 1400GTR

The ZZR1400 or Kawasaki Ninja ZX-14 and ZX-14R (2006–present), is a motorcycle in the Ninja sport bike series from the Japanese manufacturer Kawasaki that was their most powerful sport bike as of 2006. It was introduced at the 2005 Tokyo Motor Show and released for the 2006 model year as a replacement for the Kawasaki ZZ-R1200 (2002–2005). The ZZR1400 is capable of accelerating from 0–60 mph in 2.5 seconds. The top speed is electronically limited to 186 mph (299 km/h) as a result of an agreement between the major Japanese and European motorcycle manufacturers. Yet while even at a limited top speed, the Kawasaki ZX14 holds 2 notorious titles. Those titles being "King of the Quarter Mile" and "Hayabusa Killer."

The motorcycle was in season 10 of Fifth Gear on October 30, 2006.

== History ==
Motorcycle USA road tested the bike in its October 10, 2006 issue and posted the following stock results:

- 60 ft (18 m): 1.713 seconds
- 330 ft (101 m): 4.349 seconds
- 1/8 mi (201 m): 6.447 seconds, achieving 117.39 mph (188.92 km/h)
- 1/4 mi (402 m): 9.783 seconds, achieving 147.04 mph (236.64 km/h)

2008 saw a minor update. The launch of the 2012 ZX-14R saw a second-generation revision with the R designation. This included a displacement increase to produce more horsepower, along with two variable power modes, Kawasaki traction control, and an ignition-management system that was lifted from the ZX-10R. It received cosmetic updates, incremental chassis upgrades, suspension revised internals and a slipper clutch added for the first time. The new engine had cylinder heads with polished ports and cams with more lift and longer duration. Pistons were lighter with added compression, cooled by a new oil jet system. Connecting rods and crankshaft were strengthened, as were the tensioner and cam chain, while the transmission got heat-treated surface gears. In an effort to make the motorcycle run cooler and be more durable, they added a second radiator fan. Larger head pipes and larger, less restrictive mufflers improved response. Motorcyclist recorded Rickey Gadson's quarter mile time of 9.64 seconds at 149.83 mph from a bone-stock bike, on a 50-degree morning, at an altitude of 2100 feet. Cycle World recorded a quarter-mile time of a record 9.47-seconds (corrected) at 152.83 mph, and also accelerated from 0-60 mph (97 km/h) in 2.6 seconds.

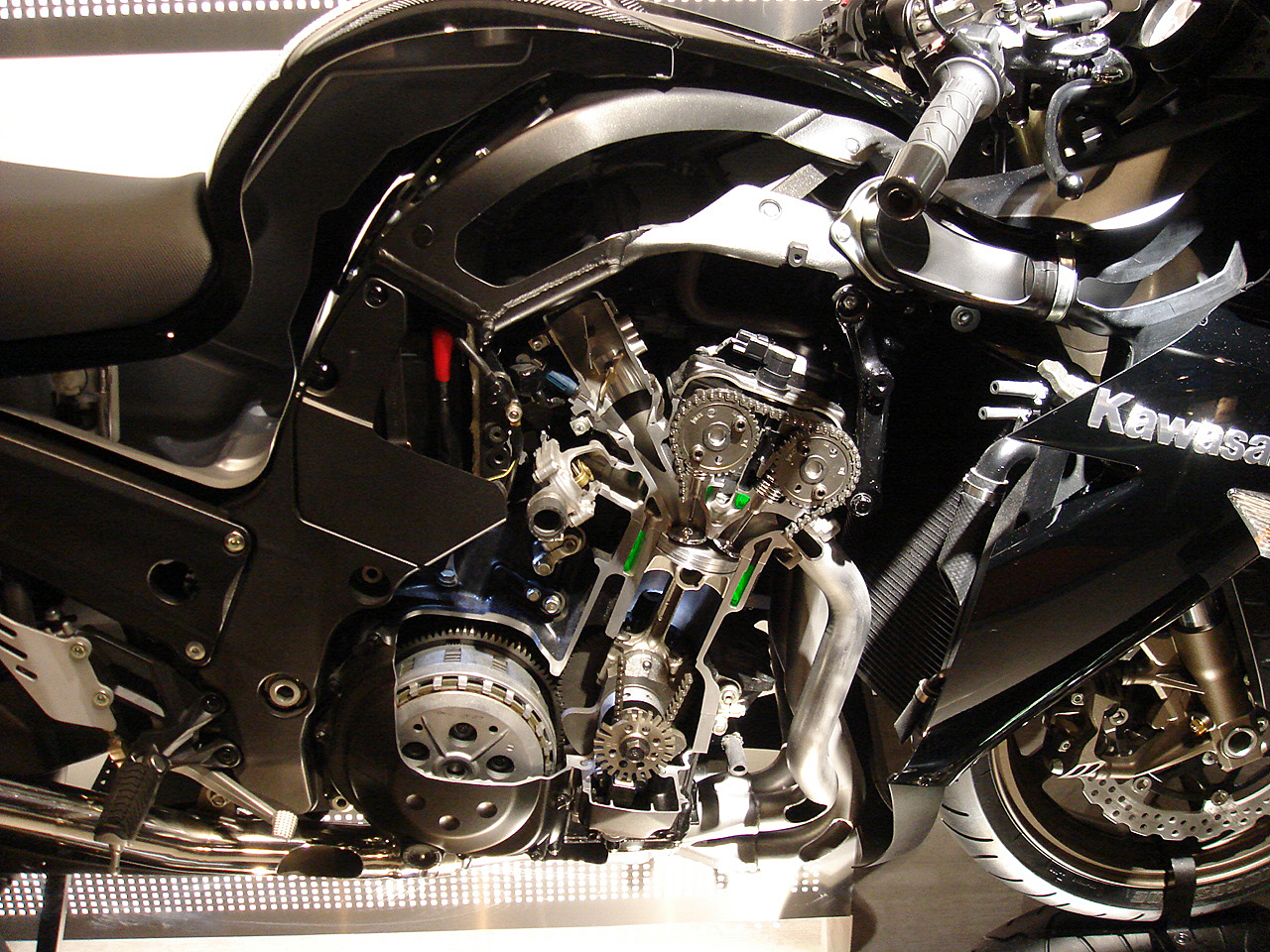
2006 ZZR1400 cutaway view of the aluminium monocoque frame and engine

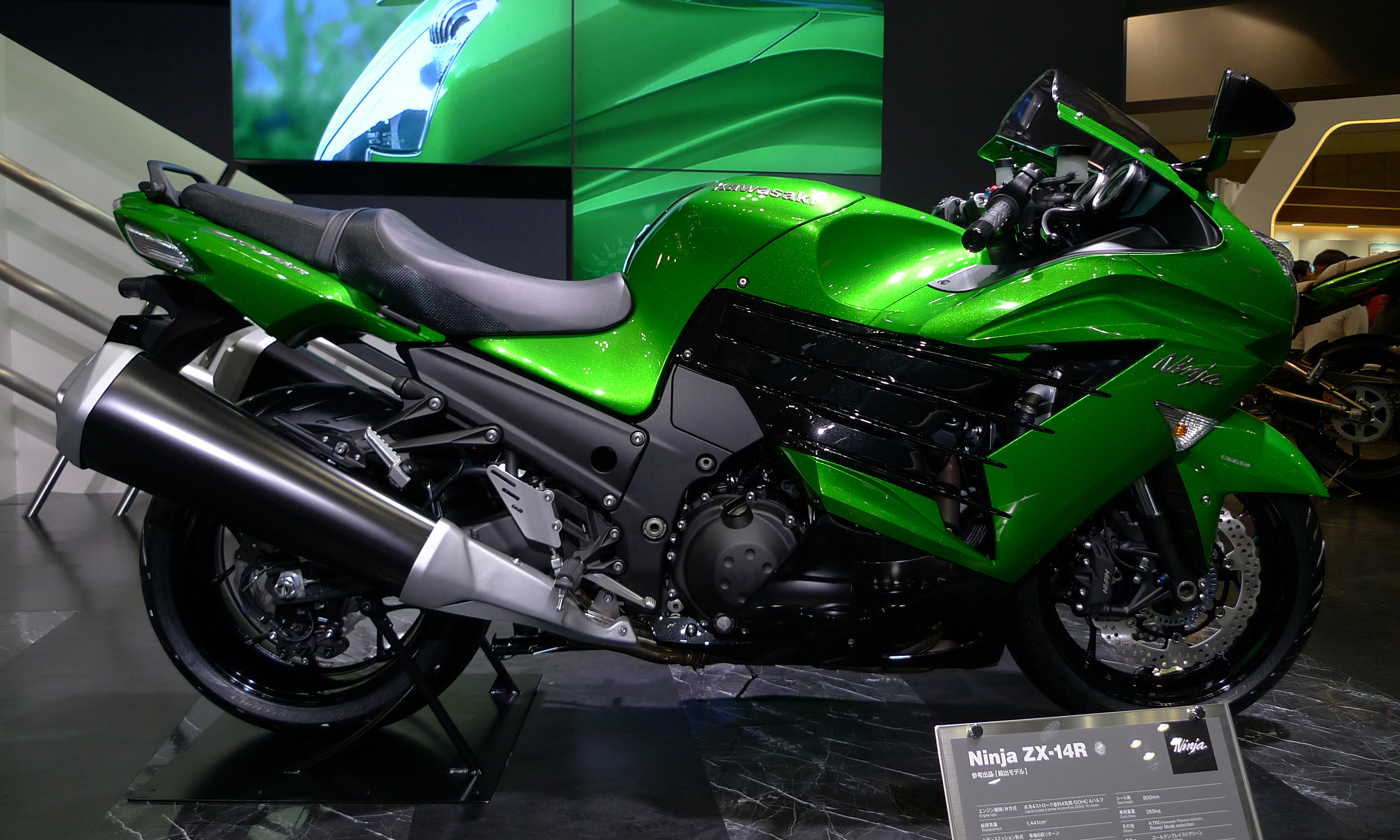
Ninja ZX-14R at the 2011 Tokyo Motor Show

== See also ==
- List of fastest production motorcycles by acceleration

Records
Preceded by Kawasaki Ninja ZX-12R	Fastest production motorcycle 2006-2007^{1}	Succeeded by MV Agusta F4 R 312
Notes and references
1. Fastest in production during its lifetime, but not record holder
