= Kawasaki Ninja ZX-9R =

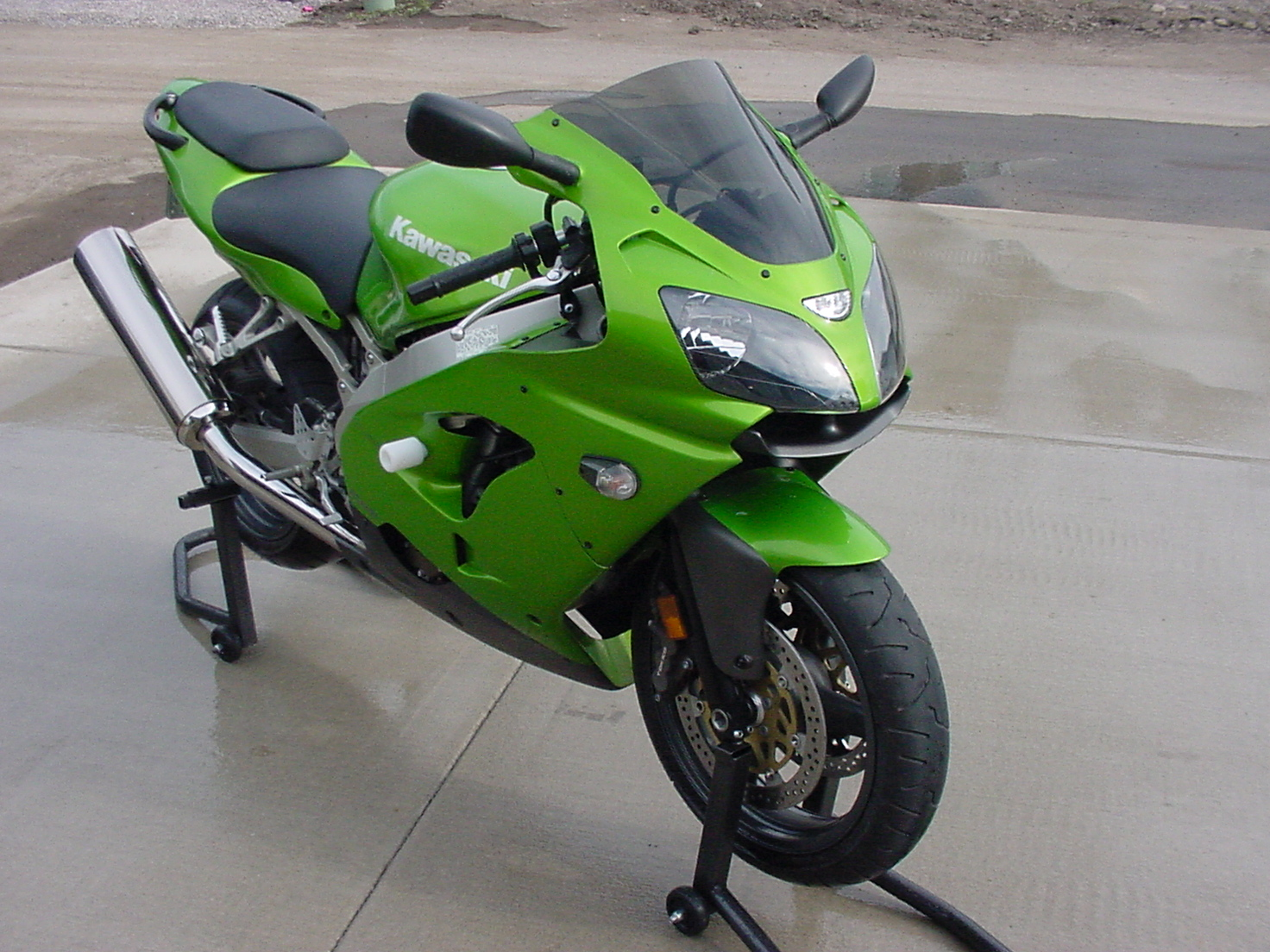
- Manufacturer: Kawasaki Motorcycle & Engine Company
- Parent company: Kawasaki Heavy Industries
- Production: 1994–2003
- Predecessor: Kawasaki GPZ900R
- Successor: Kawasaki Ninja ZX-10R
- Class: Sport bike
- Engine: 899 cc (54.9 cu in) four-stroke, liquid-cooled, 16-valve DOHC, inline-four
- Bore / stroke: 73 mm × 53.7 mm (2.9 in × 2.1 in) (94–97); 75 mm × 50.9 mm (3.0 in × 2.0 in) (98–03)
- Compression ratio: 11.5:1 (94-99); 12.2:1 (00-04)
- Top speed: 270 km/h (168 mph)
- Power: 103.7–106.6 kW (139–143 hp) (claimed); 90.4–98.5 kW (121.2–132.1 hp) (rear wheel)
- Torque: 93.6–100.3 N⋅m (69–74 lb⋅ft)(claimed); 90.0–97.2 N⋅m (66.4–71.7 lb⋅ft) (rear wheel)
- Ignition type: Digital with Kawasaki Throttle Responsive Ignition Control (K-TRIC)
- Transmission: 6-speed
- Frame type: Aluminum twin-spar
- Suspension: Front (B) 43mm upside-down KYB fully adjustable (C/F/E) 46mm cartridge fork fully adjustable Rear Uni-Trak rising rate mono shock linkage
- Rake, trail: 24°, 97 mm (3.8 in)
- Related: Kawasaki Ninja ZX-6R; Kawasaki Ninja ZX-7R; Kawasaki Ninja ZX-10R; Kawasaki Ninja ZX-12R

The Kawasaki Ninja ZX-9R is a motorcycle in the Ninja sport bike series from Japanese manufacturer Kawasaki, produced from 1994 until 2003. There were five model incarnations across two basic designs.

== Background ==
Kawasaki developed the ZX-9R in response to Honda's introduction of the CBR900RR Fireblade for the 1992 model year. The Fireblade packaged a 900cc engine into a 750cc sport bike chassis. It combined big-bore power with sport bike handling, but, crucially, it also pioneered meticulous attention to weight-saving design. The Fireblade not only outpowered the 750's, it was also significantly lighter. Honda's concept of a lightweight sport bike chassis equipped with a large engine unrestricted by racing regulations, breathed new life into the 900cc segment, prompting many manufacturers to follow suit. Kawasaki’s only liter-class machine at the time, the ZX-11, weighed 144 pounds more than the new Fireblade. Kawasaki began development on a new 900cc class sportbike based on their already successful ZX-7. The resulting bike, the Kawasaki ZX-9R was launched at the 1993 Paris Motor Show with sales beginning in 1994.

== Overview ==
The ZX-9R is powered by a liquid cooled, 899cc in-line four-cylinder with double overhead camshafts and 4 valves per cylinder. The engine case, cylinders and cylinder head are made from aluminum. A multi-plate wet clutch transfers power to a 6 speed transmission. Final drive is accomplished via chain and sprocket.

The frame used on the ZX-9R is an aluminum twin-spar design, constructed of several pressed and cast aluminum sections welded together. The rear subframe is made of welded square tube aluminum sections. The double sided aluminum swingarm used largely the same fabrication techniques as the frame.

Front suspension and brakes consisted of upside-down forks and dual disk brakes. The rear suspension was equipped with Kawasaki's Uni-Trak rocker arm system, designed to provide a progressively stiffer damping and spring rate under compression.

== Model history ==
=== ZX9R (B1-B4) 1994-97 ===
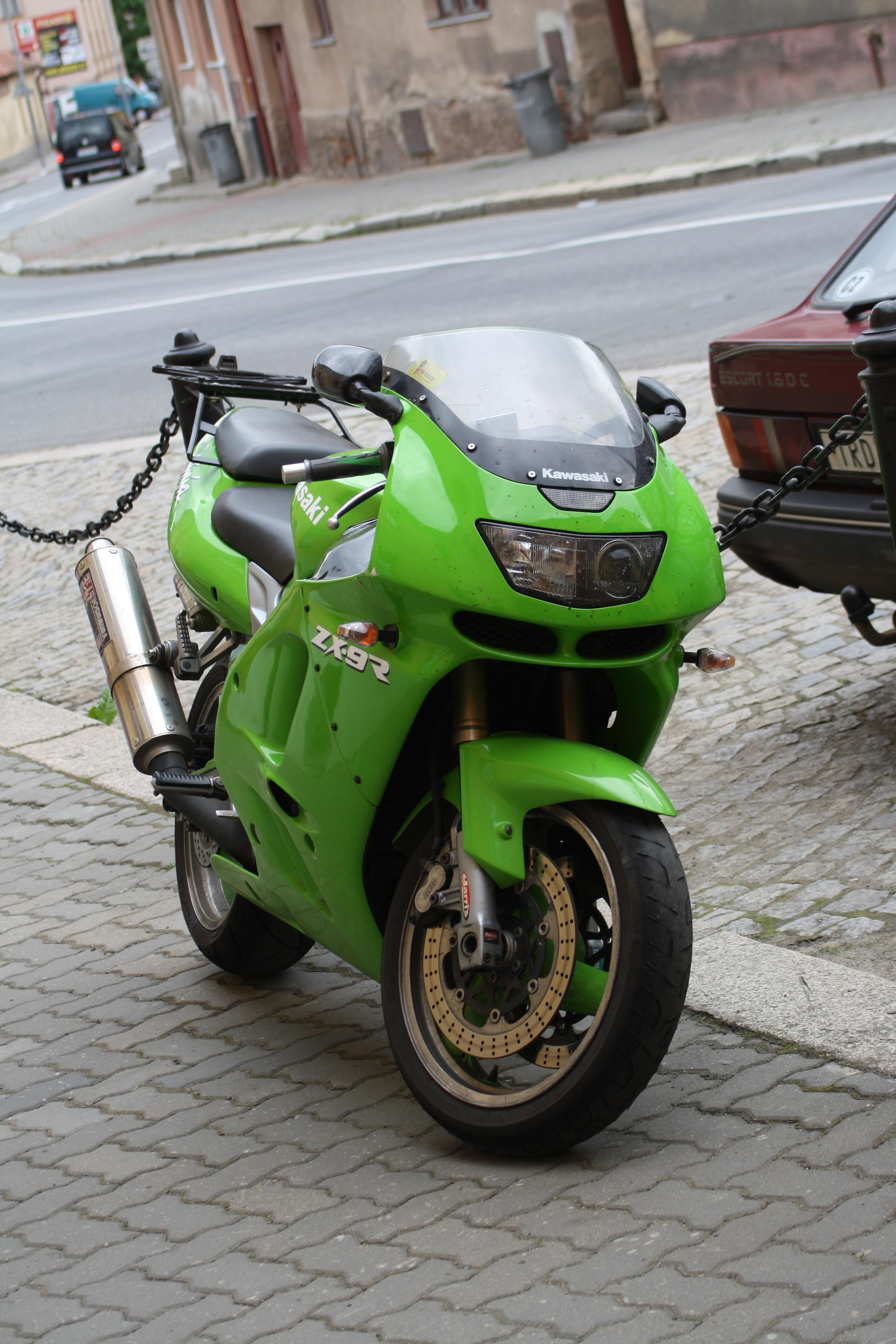
ZX-9R model 1994

The influence of the ZX-7 on the ZX-9R’s development can most clearly be seen in the first generation bikes. The chassis is a similar perimeter frame design, manufactured from pressed and cast aluminum sections welded together. One difference is that the B model ZX-9R has a bolt on engine support subframe section. Other differences include a slightly less aggressive rake angle and longer wheelbase in an effort to maintain high speed stability.

The engine in the ZX-9 shares many design features with the ZX-7 as well. To achieve a 900cc displacement, the bore and stroke were increased to 73mm x 53.7mm respectively. To account for the longer stroke, the cylinder block was lengthened, resulting in a taller overall engine package. The crankshaft and crankcases were strengthened to deal with the heavier rotating mass and higher power output of the 900cc engine. Valve actuation is via rocker-arm style cam followers, with the camshaft drive chain situated on the right side of the engine. Fueling is accomplished via 4x 40mm Kehin CVKD constant velocity carburetors. The compression ratio is 11.5:1 and the redline is at 12,000 rpm. Intake air is fed by dual ram-air intakes on the front of the bike, under the single headlight, via ducts passing back and over the frame beams near the steering head. The end product was an engine that produced 139 horsepower at 10,500 rpm, 17 more than the 1994 CBR900RR Fireblade. For the 1994 and 1995 model years, ZX-9R's sold in the United Kingdom were limited to 125 horsepower due to a manufacturers gentleman's agreement at the time.

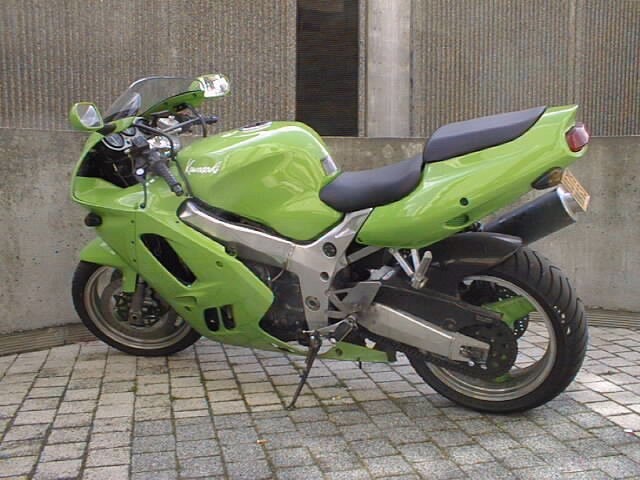
B Model ZX-9R

The front suspension consists of 43mm upside down KYB forks with compression, rebound and preload adjustability. The rear suspension uses Kawasaki’s Unitrak rocker arm linkage attached to an adjustable KYB damper equipped with a remote reservoir.

Front brakes are dual 310mm rotors clamped by 4 piston Tokiko calipers. The rear brake is a 210mm rotor with a single piston caliper. Wheelbase was measured at 57.6 in. Dry weight was quoted at 477 lbs.

Period reviews claim that the 1994-95 ZX-9R is a less sharp, more stable and comfortable alternative to the Honda Fireblade, with increased straight-line speed. A prepped B1 model as reviewed in the May 1994 issue of Cycle World magazine sprinted to a 10.65 second 131.38 MPH 1/4 mile, a top speed of 166 MPH.

The 1996 B3 model brought some updates to the ZX-9R. The rear swing arm, linkage and shock were updated to address a lack of rear end grip which gave the bike a tendency to slide into corners on the racetrack. Also added were new 6 piston Tokico front brake calipers and twin pillion grab rails.

=== ZX-9R (C1, C2) 1998-99 ===
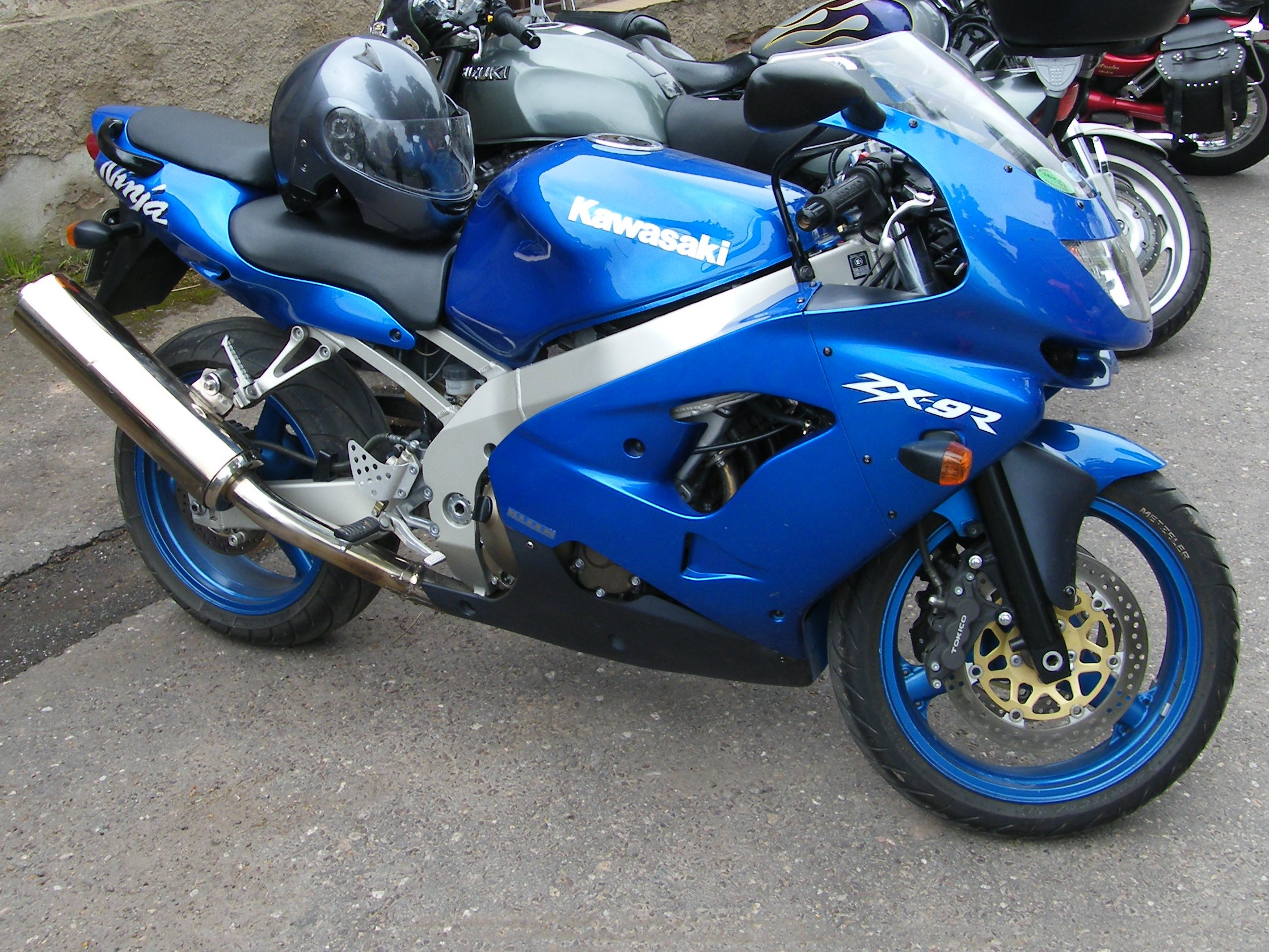
C Model ZX-9R

The 1998 model year brought in a heavily redesigned ZX-9R, complete with an entirely new engine and chassis. The C model engine shares few parts with the B model's engine. Bore was increased to 75mm while stroke was decreased to 50.9mm, allowing for larger valves. The rocker-arm style cam followers of previous years was replaced with a direct actuation bucket style, allowing for a narrower valve angle and straighter intake tracts. The new engine did retain the 11.5:1 compression ratio and the 12,000 RPM redline. The 40mm Keihin CVKD carburetors were equipped with a throttle position sensor, which combined with a new camshaft position sensor, allowed the ignition module to change ignition timing based on both RPM and load. Coil on plug ignition replaced the remote coil ignition design. The crankshaft was lightened and the generator was moved to the end of the crankshaft to reduce rotational inertia. The transmission was strengthened and had closer ratio gears. This new engine produced a claimed 143 horsepower at the crankshaft.

The chassis was updated to be shorter and lighter, now using the engine as a stressed member, eliminating the need for the steel engine cradles of the previous model. Instead of being bolted on, the aluminum rear subframe is welded to the chassis. The swing arm was a simple unbraced box beam style design.

The front suspension received 46mm right-way-up KYB forks while the rear suspension received a lighter piggyback style shock. Front brakes are 296 mm rotors clamped by 6 piston calipers. The rear brake rotor measured 220 mm in diameter.

Due to this extensive redesign, 1998 ZX-9R weighed in at 434 lbs empty, 77 lbs less than the 1997 model. Wheelbase was measured at 55.6in, 2in shorter than the B model.

Visually, the new bike retained the rounded look of its predecessor, retaining the single headlight with ram air intake below. Overall the bike was sleeker with smaller fairings.

=== ZX900E1 (2000) and ZX900E2 (2001) ===
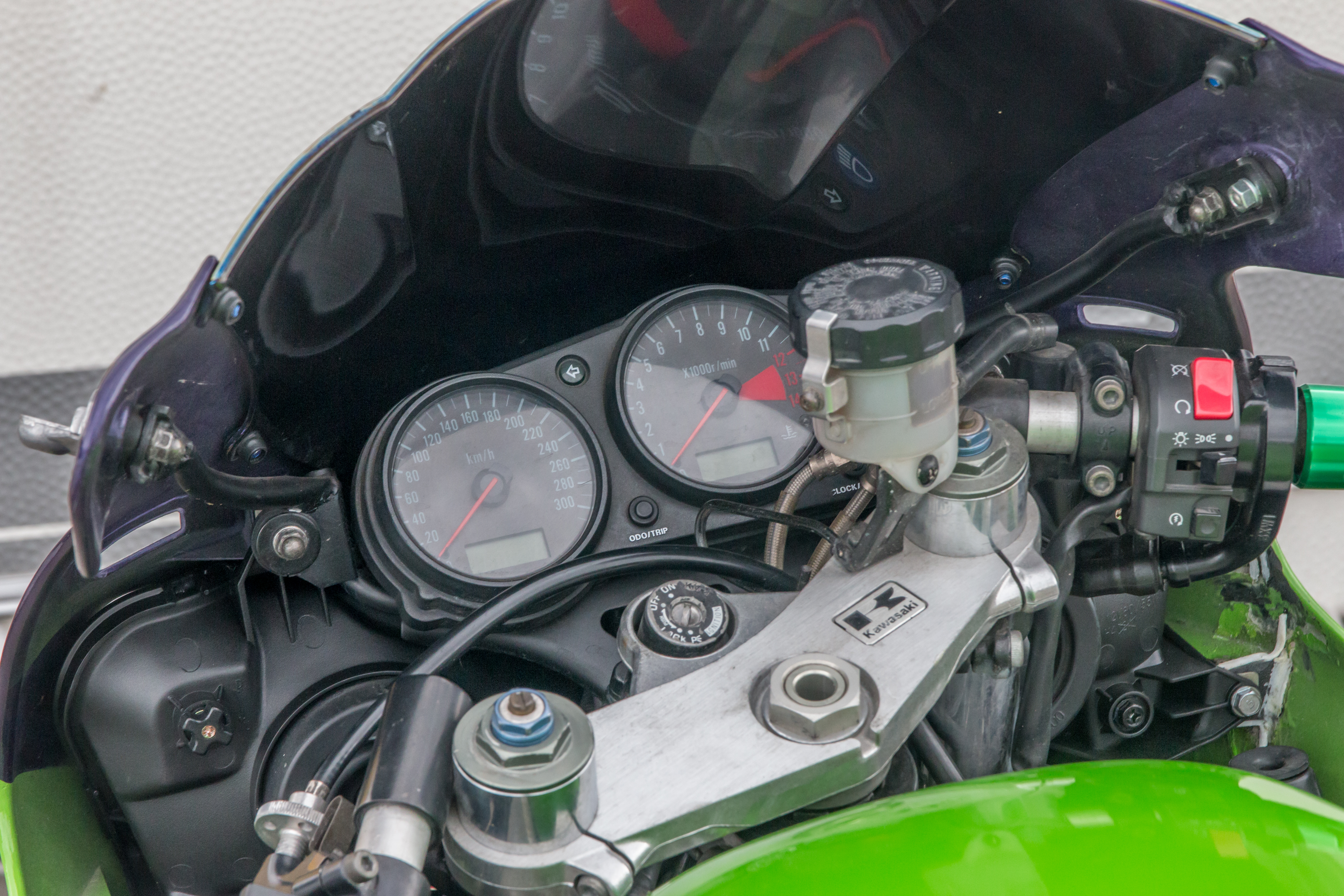
Kawasaki Ninja ZX-9RE1 cockpit

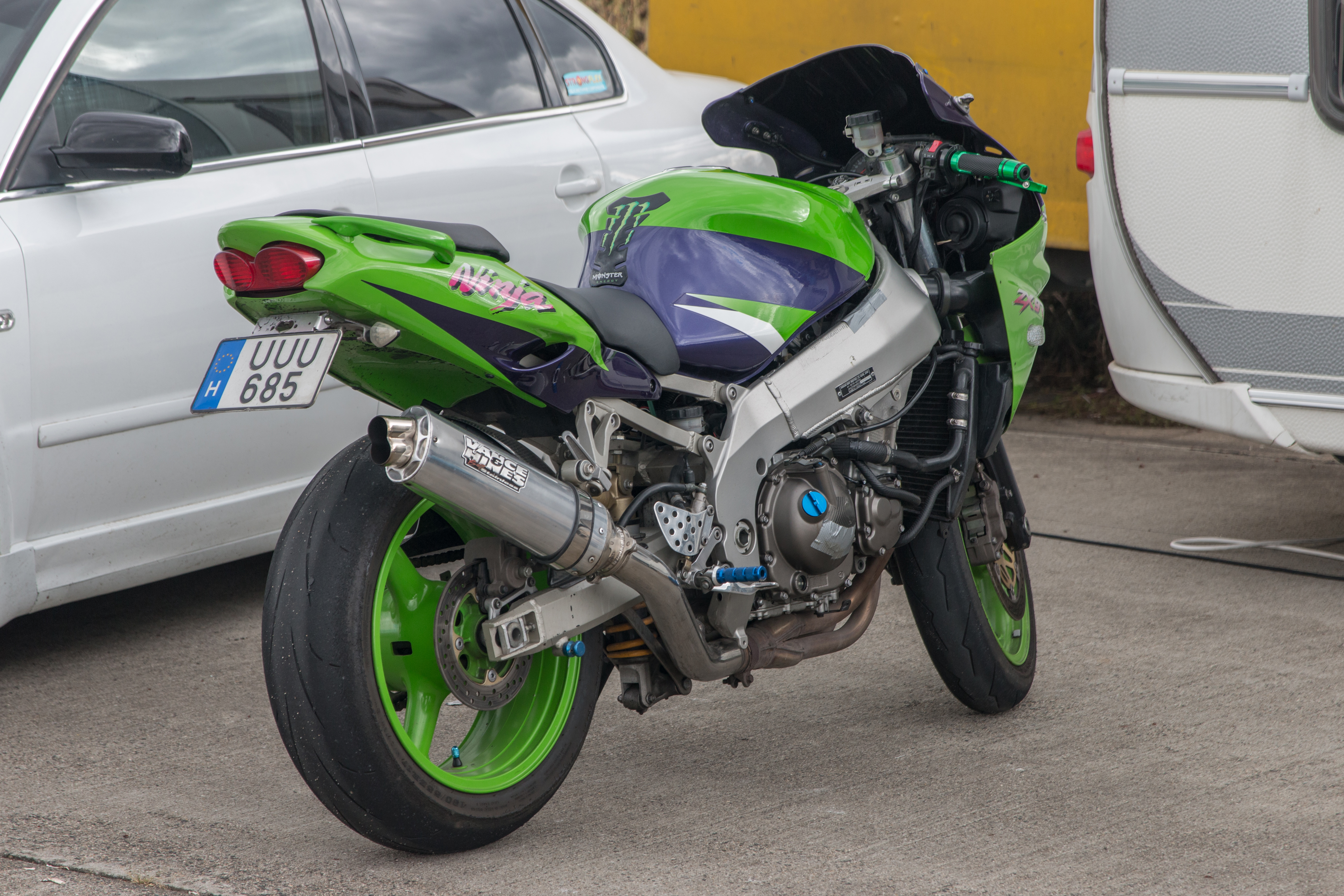
49-state Kawasaki Ninja ZX-9RE1 rear view

A new look was introduced for the 2000 model, with distinctive twin headlights and a separate ram-air intake replacing the single headlight and integrated intake of the C-model. Engine power and efficiency were boosted slightly from the 49-state C's 143 PS to 144 PS or 143 PS for the 50-state E variant respectively, from slightly shorter length CVRD 40 mm carburettors, a compression ratio increase to 12:2:1 from 11.5:1, and larger diameter (35mm vs. 31.8mm) header pipes. A lower duration intake cam increased cranking compression. Further improvements were aimed primarily at handling. 50-state variants going forward would include two-stage muffler exhaust oxidizing catalysts.

Reviewed in the April 2000 issue of Sport Rider magazine (HQ Southern California), a 49-state KHI, California, prepped ZX-9R E1 sprinted to an uncorrected 10.06 second @ 138.96 MPH 1/4 mile, 173.5 MPH top speed and boasted a tank range of 211 miles. Like the predecessors before it reviewed in California, it did so using CaRFG2 oxygenated gasoline.

The frame was made stiffer through the enlarging of the front engine mounting bolts, though this still left the ZX-9R with just a single front engine mount on either side of the frame. Further, the rubber bushings in the top rear engine mount were changed to alloy. This combined to make the engine's contribution to the stiffness of the frame/engine unit greater.

The swingarm pivot and wheel spindles were made larger in diameter, again for more stiffness. Increased offset on the triple clamps reduced the trail on the front wheel to make the steering more agile. The forks were shortened to save weight, and the rear shock top mount was redesigned to incorporate a ride-height adjuster.

=== ZX900F1 (2002) and ZX900F2 (2003) ===
Changes to the 2002–2003 ZX-9R included a new tail fairing, a single piece front mudguard, the loss of the passenger grab handles and the B/C/E model H-bar mirror bracket. Mechanical additions included a top braced swingarm (claimed 20% stronger) and rear shock with a side facing fluid reservoir, stiffened frame with relocated solid engine mounts, increased trail and reduced fork offset, and new Nissin four-piston caliper brakes and 320mm discs at the front wheel. Slight engine modifications included a return to the B/C model style Keihin CVKD carburettor and a 10% heavier crankshaft offset by a reduced diameter flywheel reported to help the engine spin up quicker, boosting low and mid-range torque.

In 2004 the ZX-9R was replaced with the ZX-10R.

== See also ==
- Kawasaki Ninja series
