= Kawasaki ZZ-R1200 =

Sport bike

ZZ-R1200
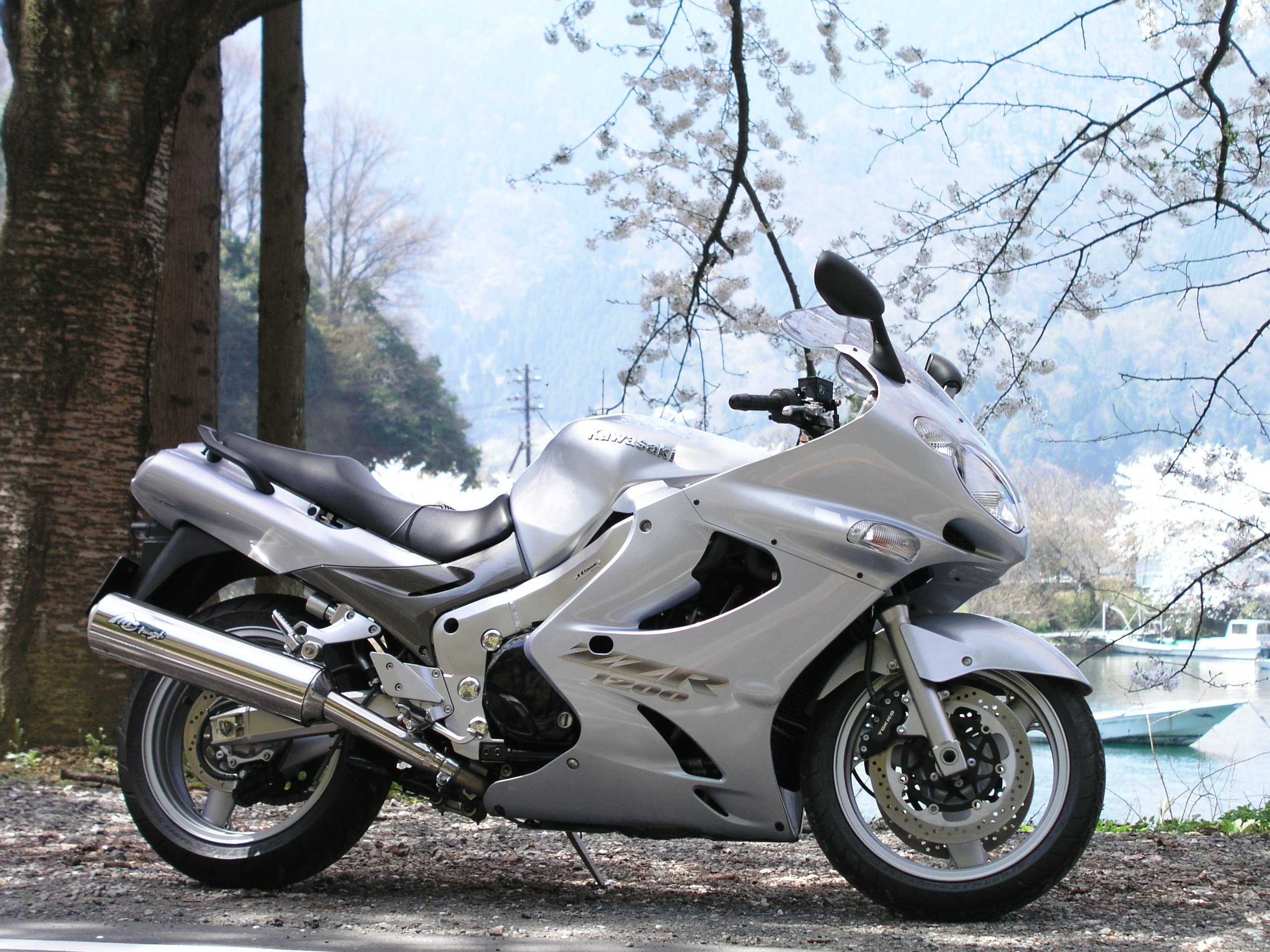
- Manufacturer: Kawasaki
- Also called: ZX-12C
- Production: 2002–2005
- Predecessor: Kawasaki ZX-11
- Successor: Kawasaki Ninja ZX-14
- Class: Sport Touring
- Engine: 1,164 cc (71.0 cu in) four-stroke, liquid-cooled, 16-valve DOHC, inline-four
- Bore / stroke: 79 mm × 59.4 mm (3.11 in × 2.34 in)
- Top speed: 169–186 mph (272–299 km/h)
- Power: 160 hp (120 kW) at 9,800rpm 145.2 hp (108.3 kW) (rear wheel)
- Torque: 92 lb⋅ft (125 N⋅m); 87.1 lb⋅ft (118.1 N⋅m) (rear wheel)
- Transmission: six-speed, chain drive
- Suspension: Front: 43mm cartridge fork with preload adjustment, with rebound added '04 onwards Rear: Uni-Trak, remote reservoir, with preload adjustment
- Brakes: Front: dual semi-floating 320 mm discs with four-piston calipers Rear: single 250 disc with twin-piston caliper
- Tires: Front 120/70-17 Rear 180/55-17
- Rake, trail: 25.0°,4.16 in (106 mm)
- Wheelbase: 1,506 mm (59.3 inch)
- Dimensions: W: 754 mm (29.7 inch); H: 1,245 mm (49.0 inches)
- Seat height: 800 mm (31.5 inch) If adjustable, lowest setting.
- Weight: 235.9 kg (520.0 pounds) (dry); 270 kg (595 pounds) (wet)
- Fuel capacity: 23 L (5.1 imp gal; 6.1 US gal)

The ZZ-R1200 or ZX-12C, is a sport touring motorcycle made by Kawasaki from (2002–2005). Identified by its model number ZX1200-C1, it is the successor to the ZX-11(1990–2001). Considered a sport tourer, it has a twin-spar aluminum frame and a liquid-cooled, DOHC, four-stroke 1164cc inline-four engine. It has twin fans, fuel pumps, and headlights. Additionally, hard touring bags can be added as an option. With factory rear wheel horsepower of 145 hp (158.8 hp claimed at 9800 rpm). It was even more powerful than the fuel injected Honda CBR1100XX. It has been said it was more powerful than any other production motorcycle carbureted or not at 9,800 rpm where it made peak power except the Suzuki Hayabusa or ZX-12R. With a quarter mile time of 10.12 seconds at 136.9 mph.
