= Kawasaki Ninja ZX-6R =

Model of Kawasaki motorcycle

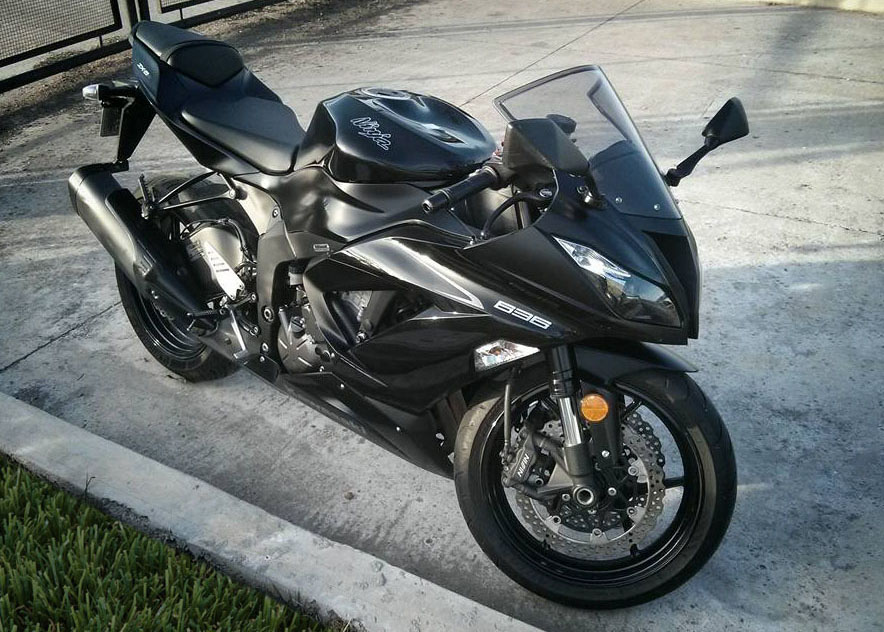
- 2013 ZX-6R
- Manufacturer: Kawasaki Motorcycle & Engine Company
- Parent company: Kawasaki Heavy Industries
- Production: 1995–present
- Assembly: Japan; Malaysia: Gurun, Kedah (Modenas)
- Predecessor: Kawasaki Ninja 600 (ZZR600/ZX-6E)
- Class: Sport bike
- Engine: 599 or 636 cc (36.6 or 38.8 cu in) four-stroke, liquid-cooled, 16-valve DOHC, transversely mounted inline four

The Kawasaki Ninja ZX-6R is a 600 cc class motorcycle in the Ninja sport bike series from the Japanese manufacturer Kawasaki. It was introduced in 1995, and has been constantly updated throughout the years in response to new products from Honda, Suzuki, and Yamaha. The ZX series is what was known as the Ninja line of Kawasaki motorcycles in the 1980s and still carries the name today.

== History ==
Kawasaki introduced the ZX-6R in 1995 with very similar looks and features like the 1994 introduced ZX-9R, including the ram-air intake that had been developed by Kawasaki since the 1990 ZX-11 (ZZ-R1100). The first ZX-6R had a dry weight of 401.2 lb (182.0 kg), wet weight of 454 lb (206 kg), and was capable of accelerating 0 to 60 mph (0 to 97 km/h) in 3.6 seconds.

There was a major revamp of the ZX-6R in 1998 with the Launch of the G series. The G series saw no increase in displacement but power went from 100 BHP to 108 BHP thanks to the newly designed airbox. The fairing was revamped, but it retained a similar design for the headlight, air intakes and windscreen. In 2000, the first J series replaced the G, increasing power to 112 BHP by increasing the compression ratio from 11.8:1 to 12.8:1. The J series sported a couple of modernisations including a 180 section rear tire, second headlight, uprated generator and stick coils (coil on plug) replacing the traditional coil with HT lead.

With strong competition from Honda's CBR600F4i, Suzuki's GSX-R600, and Yamaha's YZF-R6, Kawasaki decided on an unusual move for the late 2002 models. They increased the capacity of the traditional 600 cc (37 cu in) motor to 636 cubic centimetres (38.8 cu in) with the ZX-6R A1P. This version used the J series bodywork with the only notable differences being the "636" stickers on the fairing. For riders who needed bikes for displacement-restricted racing, Kawasaki also made available a limited production 599 cc (36.6 cu in) version, the Ninja ZX-6RR, but the 636 cc (38.8 cu in) ZX-6R would be their main mass production middleweight sport bike.

In 2003, there were a number of changes to the ZX-6R, or ZX636 as it is often referred. The engine was fuel injected and engine speed was raised around 500 RPM which resulted in a slight gain in power. Radial-mounted four-piston brakes replaced the previous six-piston brakes and the front forks were now inverted. Chassis improvements resulted in higher rigidity and less weight. An all digital instrument panel was also introduced and a larger ram-air intake inlet moved to the center over the headlight, running through the headstock. The bike, designation B1H, carried over to the 2004 model year with just color scheme changes. The ZX-6RR won the Supersport category award for Masterbike 2004 and placed third overall.

In 2005, Kawasaki again revamped the ZX-6R. Engine speed increased again by 1,000 RPM resulting in 131 hp (98 kW) at 12,250 RPM. The frame and swingarm were updated, but the main changes from its predecessor lay in the design. The aluminum frame was now painted flat black, fairings were more round, and integrated turn signals were used (euro model). The exhaust was now centrally under the seat (a configuration commonly referred to as an undertail exhaust). Most of these changes were mirrored in the 599 cc ZX-6RR. For the second year in a row, the ZX-6RR again won the Supersport category award for Masterbike 2005 and placed third overall. The bike carried over to the 2006 model year with minor suspension changes and new color schemes.

After four years of offering their 636 cc ZX-6R for street use and an entirely separate 599 cc ZX-6RR for displacement-restricted racing classes, Kawasaki offered only one ZX-6R for 2007, and it displaced 599 cc. Previous years of the ZX-6R's engines were all built from the same basic design, but the all-new engine for 2007 was redesigned from the crankcase up. In following with what their competitors had already been doing, Kawasaki's new engine featured a stacked gear arrangement in which the crankshaft, primary drive and countershaft are placed in a triangular format for a shorter, more compact powerplant. Now about 40 mm smaller in both length and width and it is said to yield greater cornering clearance. By using a former 125 cc Grand Prix racer as the ZX-6R's chief development rider, Tomomi Manako, Kawasaki claims a focus has been put on track usage. Frame, swingarm, suspension, brakes, and body were completely redesigned and the bike shares very few parts from the previous model. The ZX-6R was carried over to the 2008 model year with just color scheme changes.

For 2009, Kawasaki dramatically changed the appearance of the ZX-6R to match the more angular look of the ZX-10R. Kawasaki claims the new ZX-6R is 10 kg lighter than the previous model. The greatest changes for 2009 were the redesign of the exhaust, now carried low and not requiring the thick under-seat construction of 2008 and especially the introduction of the Showa Big Piston Fork (BPF) suspension for a more progressive brake-dive. The 2010 ZX-6R is changing once more with an improved engine and slipper clutch. The exhaust pre-chamber has more space and also limits exhaust noise giving the rider a smoother ride. New double bore intake funnels features two available heights which gives performance upgrades in both high and low engine speeds. The front seat is now lower.

For 2013, Kawasaki reintroduced the ZX-6R 636, while still continuing to sell the regular, 599 cc 2009-2012 ZX-6R at a lower price.

The 2013 ZX-6R 636 is a brand new bike, making it the model with the most power output to date. Engine displacement has again been increased to 636 cc, with two fuel maps available to choose via a switch on the handlebars. The new version has increased torque and horsepower, and the increased performance is apparent at lower RPM. While the tail is identical to the one in the 2009-2012 model, it features new front and side fairings, new dash, new frame, new Showa BPF-SFF front suspension, Kawasaki Traction Control (KTRC) with three modes (sport, city and rain) as standard equipment, and Kawasaki Intelligent anti-lock Brake System (KIBS) available as option.

In Showa's Big Piston Fork - Separate Function Fork (BPF-SFF) suspension, the left leg bar a bigger and stronger spring than the right one, with regulated pre-load. The right bar has bigger oil damper section, with regulated rebound and compression damping. According to the manufacturer, this asymmetric design provides a reduction of the friction inside the fork, significant mass loss and more friendly response of suspension. The KTRC system uses manipulation of the ignition timing on all 3 traction control modes, while mode 3 (rain mode) also uses a separate throttle controlled by the on-board electronics, to allow faster reaction for wheel over-spin on slippery surfaces. Traction control and power modes can be adjusted or turned off whenever the throttle is closed, even while riding the bike. The bike is sold without a steering damper, as customer complaints about the OEM steering damper on previous models prompted Kawasaki to discontinue this feature on subsequent models.

The ZX-6R 636 for 2019 has some updates consisting of: Euro 4 compliance, KQS quickshifter (up only), updated bodywork and seat, LED headlights and updated dashboard. The claimed horsepower also sees a slight drop from the 2018 model's 96.4 kW (129.3 hp) to 94.9 kW (127.3 hp).

Through the 2020 model year, Kawasaki sold only the 636 cc (38.8 cu in) displacement Ninja ZX-6R in most markets, while in Japan the 599 cc (36.6 cu in) version continues to be sold alongside the 636 since the model year 2003 onwards.

In July 2023, Kawasaki announced the 2024 model year for ZX-6R. The bike meets the Euro 5 emission standards, with yet another slight reduction of horsepower compared to the previous model. The ABS has been updated and a redesigned stock exhaust system along with a new front twin headlamp, and for the first time it features a color TFT LCD dashboard.

=== Motorsport ===
Andrew Pitt won the Supersport World Championship in 2001 with a ZX-6R, and Kenan Sofuoğlu won it in 2012, 2015 and 2016. Also, Kawasaki won the Supersport World Championship manufacturers title in 2013, 2015 and 2016.

== Specifications ==
	1995–1997 ZX-6R	1998–1999 ZX-6R	2000–2002 ZX-6R	2003–2004 ZX-6RR	2005–2006 ZX-6RR	2007–2008 ZX-6R	2009–2012 ZX-6R	2003–2004 ZX-6R	2005–2006 ZX-6R	2013–2018 ZX-6R	2019–2023 ZX-6R	2024–present ZX-6R
Picture	1997 ZX-6R	1999 ZX-6R	2002 ZX-6R	2003 ZX-6RR	2005 ZX-6R	2007 ZX-6R	2009 ZX-6R	2003 ZX-6R	2005 ZX-6R	2013 ZX-6R 636		
Engine type	Transverse 4-stroke, liquid-cooled, DOHC, 4-valve, inline 4-cylinder											
Displacement	599 cc (36.6 cu in)							636 cc (38.8 cu in)				
Bore × stroke	66.0 mm × 43.8 mm (3 in × 2 in)			67.0 mm × 42.5 mm (3 in × 2 in)				68.0 mm × 43.8 mm (3 in × 2 in)			67.0 mm × 45.1 mm (3 in × 2 in)	
Power (crank)		74.5 kW (99.9 hp) @ 12,500 RPM					94.1 kW (126.2 hp) @ 14,000 RPM	87 kW (117 hp) @ 13,000 RPM 91.5 kW (122.7 hp) @ 13,000 RPM with ram air	95.5 kW (128.1 hp) @ 14,000 RPM 100 kW (130 hp) @ 14,000 RPM with ram air	96.4 kW (129.3 hp) @ 13,500 RPM 101 kW (135 hp) @ 13,500 RPM with ram air	95.5 kW (128.1 hp) @ 13,500 RPM	
Power (rear wheel)	66.5 kW (89.2 hp)	70.5 kW (94.5 hp)	73.5 kW (98.5 hp) @ 12500 RPM	77.2 kW (103.5 hp) @ 13,000 RPM	75.7 kW (101.5 hp) @ 13,500 RPM	75.8 kW (101.6 hp) @ 12,700 RPM (US variant)	80.3 kW (107.7 hp) @ 14,100 RPM	83.1 kW (111.4 hp) @ 12,750 RPM	84.9 kW (113.8 hp) @ 14,000 RPM	83.70 kW (112.24 hp) @ 13,500 RPM		
Torque (rear wheel)	60.5 N⋅m (44.6 lb⋅ft)	59.9 N⋅m (44.2 lb⋅ft)	59.2 N⋅m (43.7 lb⋅ft)	60.6 N⋅m (44.7 lb⋅ft) @ 10,000 RPM	58.4 N⋅m (43.1 lb⋅ft) @ 11,000 RPM	59.0 N⋅m (43.5 lb⋅ft) @ 11,900 RPM	58.2 N⋅m (42.9 lb⋅ft) @ 12,000 RPM	63.9 N⋅m (47.1 lb⋅ft) @ 11,000 RPM	65.2 N⋅m (48.1 lb⋅ft) @ 11,500 RPM	62.87 N⋅m (46.37 lb⋅ft) @ 11,375 RPM	70.6 N⋅m (52.1 lb⋅ft) @ 11,500 RPM	
Compression ratio	12.9:1	11.8:1	12.8:1	13.0:1	13.9:1	13.3:1		12.8:1	12.9:1			
Fuel injection	Four Keihin CVKD36 carburetors	Four Mikuni BDSR 36R carburetors		DFI with Keihin 38 millimetres (1.5 in) throttle bodies (4)		DFI with four 38 millimetres (1.5 in) Keihin throttle bodies, oval sub-throttles, two injectors per throttle body		EFI with Keihin 38 millimetres (1.5 in) throttle bodies	DFI with Keihin 38 millimetres (1.5 in) throttle bodies (4)		DFI with Keihin 38 millimetres (1.5 in) throttle bodies (4) and oval sub-throttles	
Transmission	6-speed			6-speed with slipper clutch				6-speed	6-speed with slipper clutch		6-speed with slipper clutch, quickshifter for upshifts	
Final drive	X-ring chain											
Rake/trail	-/107 mm (4.2 in)	23.5°/91 mm (3.6 in)		24.5°/95 mm (3.75 in)	25.5°/110 mm (4.3 in)	25°/110 mm (4.3 in)	24°/103 mm (4.06 in)	23.5°/94 mm (3.7 in)	25°/110 mm (4.2 in)	23.5°/100 mm (4.0 in)		
Front wheel travel	119 mm (4.7 in)											
Rear wheel travel		135 mm (5.3 in)		135 mm (5.31 in)	135 mm (5.3 in)	132 mm (5.2 in)	135 mm (5.3 in)				150 mm (5.9 in)	
Front tire size	120/60-17	120/60-ZR17		120/65-ZR17		120/70-ZR17		120/65-ZR17		120/70-ZR17		
Rear tire size	160/60-17	170/60-ZR17		180/55-ZR17								
Wheelbase	1,400 mm (55 in)	1,400 mm (55.1 in)				1,400 mm (55.3 in)	1,400 mm (55.1 in)		1,390 mm (54.7 in)	1,390 mm (54.9 in)	1,400 mm (55.1 in)	
Front suspension	41 mm Telescopic forks	46 mm (2 in) cartridge fork with adjustable preload, compression and rebound damping			41 mm (2 in) inverted cartridge fork with adjustable preload, stepless rebound and compression damping, TiSiCN coating	41 mm (2 in) inverted cartridge fork with top-out springs, stepless rebound damping, stepless compression damping, fully adjustable spring preload	41 mm (2 in) inverted Showa big piston fork with top-out springs, stepless compression and rebound damping, fully adjustable spring preload	41 mm (2 in) inverted cartridge fork with adjustable preload, stepless rebound and compression damping		41 mm (2 in) inverted Showa big piston fork, separate function fork with top-out springs, stepless compression and rebound damping, fully adjustable spring preload		
Rear suspension	Monoshock, Uni-Trak	Uni-Trak with adjustable preload, compression and rebound damping			Uni-Trak with adjustable preload, stepless rebound, (high/low speed) compression damping, and ride height	Bottom-link Uni-Trak with gas-charged shock, top-out spring and pillow ball upper mount, dual-range (high/low-speed) stepless compression damping, 25-way adjustable rebound damping, fully adjustable spring preload		Bottom-link Uni-Trak system with gas-charged shock, stepless rebound and compression adjustability	Uni-Trak with adjustable preload, stepless rebound and compression damping	Bottom-link Uni-Trak with gas-charged shock, top-out spring and pillow ball upper mount, dual-range (high/low-speed) stepless compression damping, 25-way adjustable rebound damping, fully adjustable spring preload		
Front brake	Twin (dual) discs Tokico 4 pot caliper	Dual discs with 6-piston Tokico caliper		Dual 280 mm (11 in) semi-floating discs with radial-mount opposed 4-piston calipers	Dual 300 mm (12 in) floating petal-type rotors with radial mount, opposed 4-piston calipers	Dual 300 mm (12 in) petal rotors with dual radial-mounted, Nissin 4-piston, 4-pad calipers		Dual 280 mm (11 in) discs with 4-piston calipers	Dual 300 mm (12 in) floating petal-type rotors with radial mount, opposed 4-piston calipers	Dual 310 mm (12 in) petal rotors with dual radial-mount, Nissin 4-piston, monobloc calipers		
Rear brake	Single disc Tokico 1 (single) pot caliper	Single disc with single-piston Tokico caliper		Single 220 mm (9 in) disc	Single 220 mm (9 in) petal-type rotor with single-piston caliper				Single 220 mm (9 in) disc	Single 220 mm (9 in) petal-type rotor with single-piston caliper		
Fuel tank capacity	18 L (4.0 imp gal; 4.8 US gal)						17 L (3.7 imp gal; 4.5 US gal)					
Seat height	810 mm (31.9 in)	810 mm (32 in)	790 mm (31.1 in)	825 mm (32.47 in)	820 mm (32.3 in)		820 mm (32.1 in)	830 mm (32.5 in)	810 mm (32 in)	830 mm (32.7 in)		
Dry weight	182 kg (401 lb)	176 kg (388 lb)	170 kg (370 lb)	161 kg (355 lb)		166.9 kg (368.0 lb)		161 kg (355 lb)	164 kg (362 lb)			
Dry Weight (tested)	182 kg (401.2 pounds)				182.8 kg (403.0 lb)	182.1 kg (401.5 lb)		176.4 kg (389.0 lb)	183.3 kg (404.0 lb)			
Wet weight (claimed)	184 kg						191.0 kg (421.0 lb)			192.1 kg (423.4 lb)	195.0 kg (430.0 lb)	
Wet weight (tested)	211 kg (465 lb)	202 kg (446 lb)		189.6 kg (418.0 lb)	195.0 kg (430.0 lb)	194.4 kg (428.5 lb)		189.6 kg (418.0 lb)	195.5 kg (431.0 lb)			
Performance
0 to 60 mph (0 to 97 km/h)	3.6 sec.	3.0 sec.							3.06 sec.			
0 to 1/4 mi (0.00 to 0.40 km)	10.97 sec. @ 200.72 km/h (124.72 mph)	10.89 sec. @ 201.23 km/h (125.04 mph)							10.78 sec. @ 204.58 km/h (127.12 mph)			
Top speed	248 km/h (154 mph)	251 km/h (156 mph)							257–264 km/h (160–164 mph)			
Fuel economy	41 mpg - 160 miles range								6.52 L/100 km; 43.4 mpg_{‑imp} (36.1 mpg_{‑US})			
