= Ram-air intake =

Vehicle air intake design

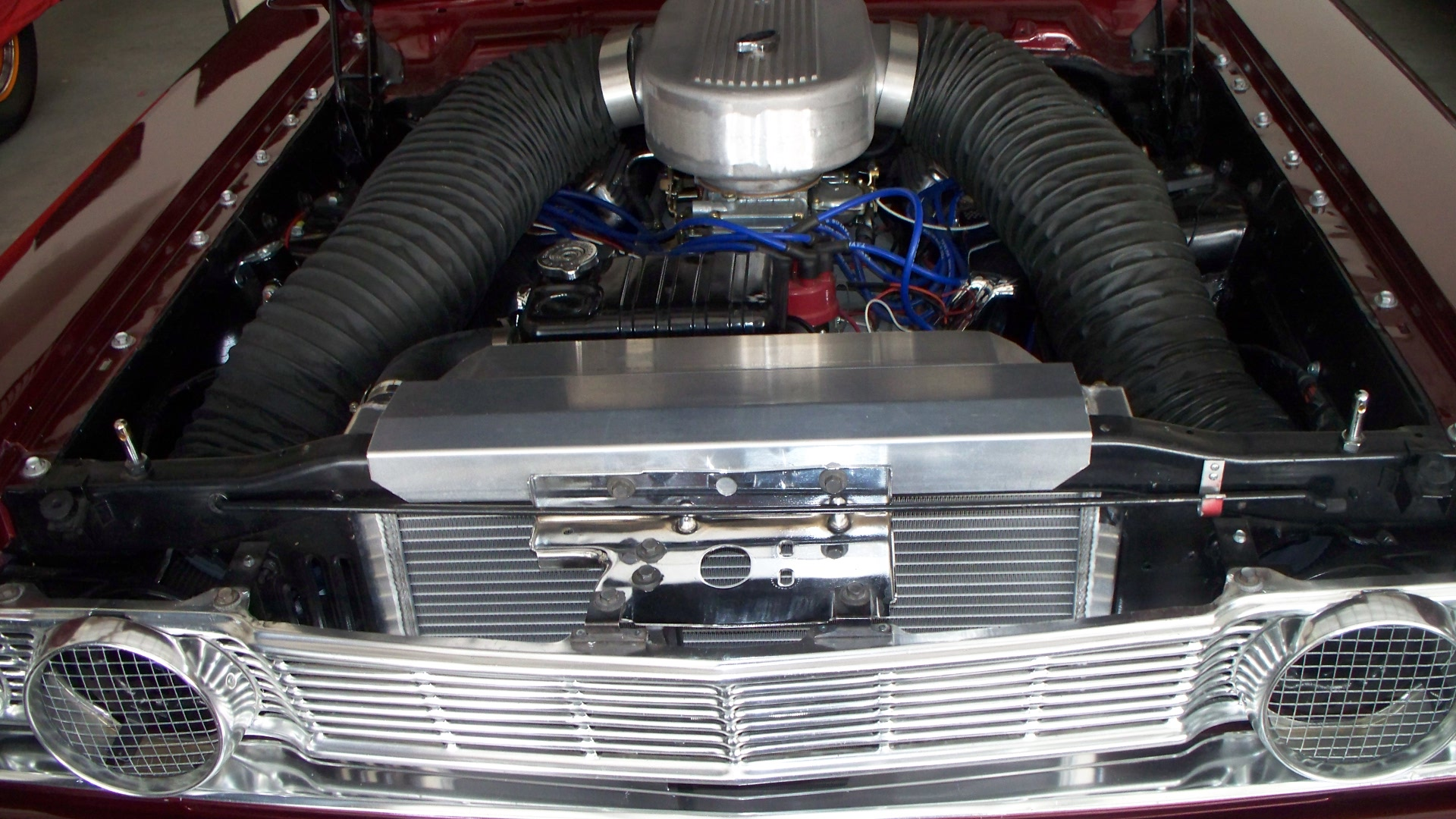
Factory dual ram-air intakes on a Ford Thunderbolt

A ram-air intake is an intake design which uses the dynamic air pressure created by vehicle motion, or ram pressure, to increase the static air pressure inside of the intake manifold of an internal combustion engine. The greater massflow through the engine allows an increase in engine power.

== Application ==
The ram-air intake works by reducing the intake air velocity by increasing the cross-sectional area of the intake ducting. When gas velocity decreases the pressure is increased. The increased pressure in the air box will ultimately have a positive effect on engine output as more oxygen will enter the cylinder during each engine cycle.

Ram-air systems are used on high-performance vehicles, most often on performance cars, and, extremely rarely, motorcycles. The 1990 Kawasaki Ninja ZX-11 C1 was the first production motorcycle to use one.

Ram-air was a feature on some cars in the sixties. It fell out of favor in the seventies, but recently made a comeback. While ram-air intakes may increase the volumetric efficiency of an engine, they can be difficult to combine with carburetors, which rely on a venturi-engineered pressure drop to draw fuel through the main jet. As the pressurised ram-air may kill this venturi effect, the carburetor needs to be designed to take this into account.

At low speeds (subsonic speeds) increases in static pressure are however limited to a few percent.

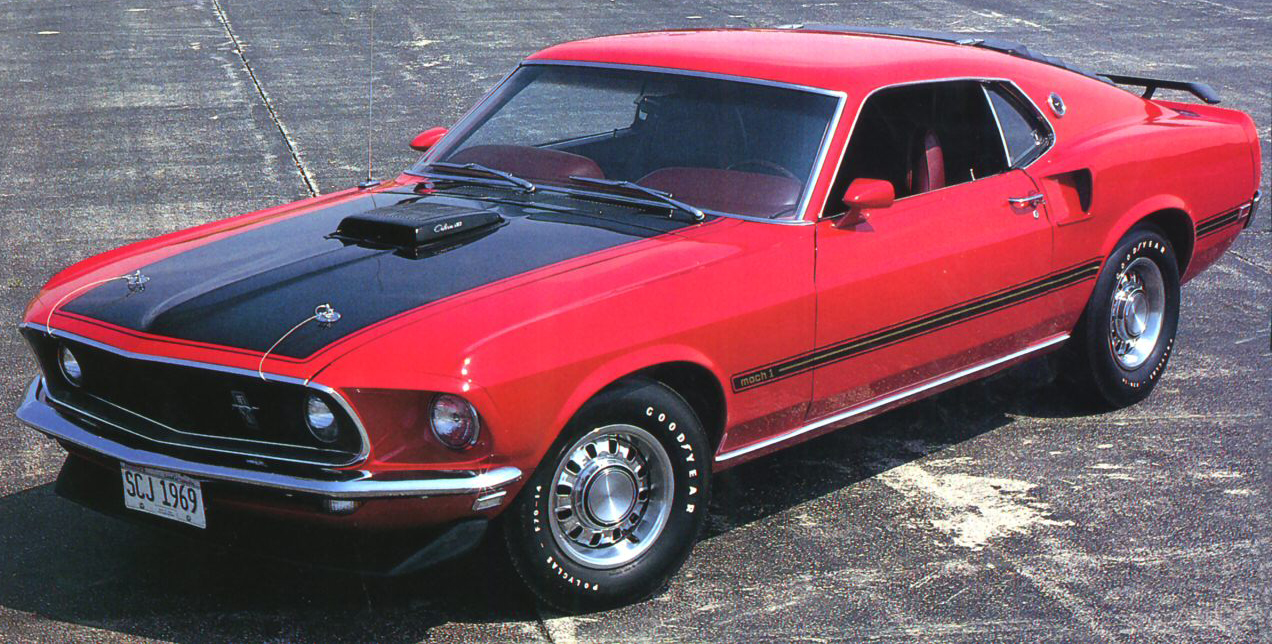
Shaker-style ram-air hood scoop on a 1969 Mustang Mach 1

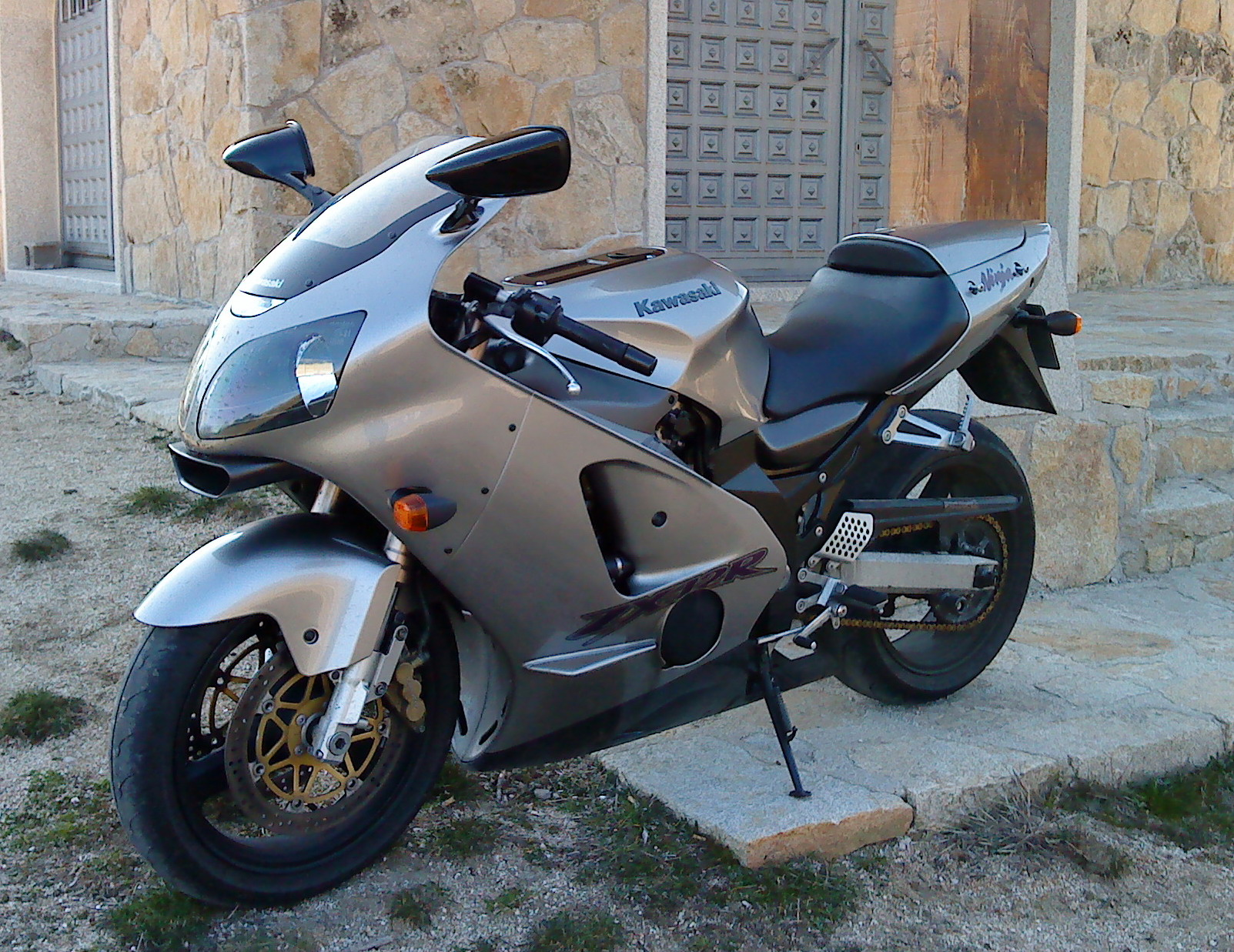
Ram-air intake below the headlight of a Kawasaki ZX-12R

== See also ==
- Air filter
- Booster
- Pontiac Ram Air
- Ramjet
- Shaker scoop
- Supercharger
- Turbocharger
- Diffuser (automotive)
- Inertial supercharging effect
