= Kawasaki Ninja ZX-11 =

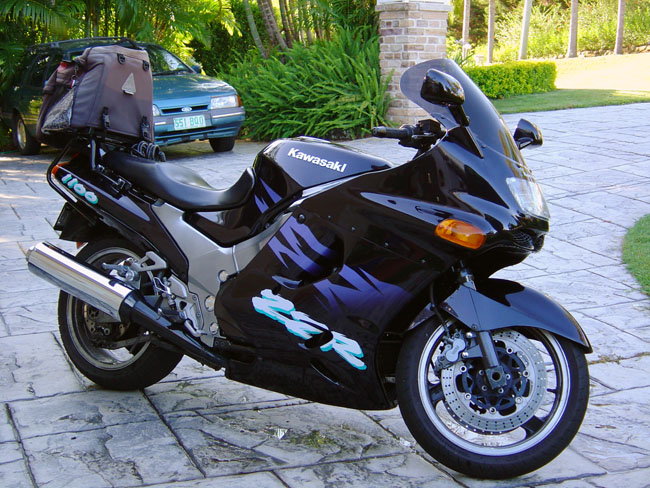
- 1996 ZZ-R1100 D
- Manufacturer: Kawasaki motorcycles
- Also called: ZZ-R1100
- Parent company: Kawasaki Heavy Industries
- Production: 1989–2001
- Predecessor: ZX-10
- Successor: ZZ-R1200 (ZX-12C)
- Class: Sport bike
- Engine: 1,052 cc (64.2 cu in) four-stroke, liquid-cooled, 16-valve DOHC, inline-four
- Bore / stroke: 76 mm × 58 mm (3.0 in × 2.3 in)
- Top speed: 283 km/h (176 mph)
- Power: 134.4 hp (100.2 kW) (rear wheel) 145 bhp (108 kW) @ 10,500 rpm (claimed)
- Torque: 78.8 lb⋅ft (106.8 N⋅m) (rear wheel)80.0 lb⋅ft (108.5 N⋅m)@ 8,000 rpm (claimed)
- Transmission: 6-speed manual, chain-drive
- Weight: 249 kg (549 lb) (dry); 274 kg (603 lb) (wet)
- Fuel consumption: 5.51 L/100 km; 51.3 mpg_{‑imp} (42.7 mpg_{‑US})

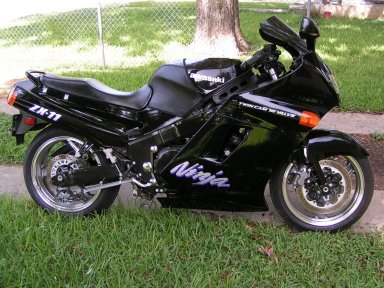
1992 Kawasaki ZX-11 C Model

The ZZ-R1100 or ZX-11 is a sport bike in Kawasaki's Ninja series made from 1989 to 2001, as the successor to the 1988–1990 Tomcat ZX-10. With a top speed of 272–283 km/h (169–176 mph), it was the fastest production motorcycle from its introduction until 1996, surpassed by the 270–290 km/h (170–180 mph) Honda CBR1100XX. It was marketed as the ZX-11 Ninja in North America and the ZZ-R1100 in the rest of the world. The C-model ran from 1989 to 1993 while the D-model ran from 1993 to 2001, when it was replaced by the ZZ-R1200 (ZX-12C) 2002–2005.

== Competition for fastest production motorcycle ==
With a record top speed of 272–283 km/h (169–176 mph), the ZX-11 was the fastest production motorcycle for six years, from its introduction in 1989 through 1995, when it was surpassed by the 1996 Honda CBR1100XX. When the bike was introduced in 1989, the nearest production bike top speed was 16 km/h (10 mph) slower and it belonged to the ZX-10, the bike that Kawasaki was replacing with the ZX-11. The ZX-11 also had a ram air induction system. The 1989 ZX-11 C1 model got a ram-air intake, the very first on any production motorcycle. The 1997 ZX-11's quarter-mile time was 10.43 seconds at 211.45 km/h (131.39 mph).

In 2000 the Kawasaki Ninja ZX-12R was introduced. The ZX-12R was designed to be more of a pure sport bike. It was much anticipated since the Suzuki GSX1300R Hayabusa held the title for fastest production bike when it was introduced in 1999. European governments threatened to ban high speed motorcycles, leading Kawasaki to de-tune the ZX-12R prior to its release. Starting at the very end of 1999, a gentlemen's agreement between larger European and Japanese manufacturers has limited production motorcycle top speeds to 300 km/h (186 mph),

In 2002 the Kawasaki ZZ-R1200 was released, which is a sport tourer and more akin to the ZX-11.

== See also ==
- List of fastest production motorcycles by acceleration

== Notes ==
Records
Preceded by Bimota YB6 EXUP	Fastest production motorcycle 1990–1996	Succeeded by Honda CBR1100XX
