= Kawasaki Ninja =

Motorcycle model series

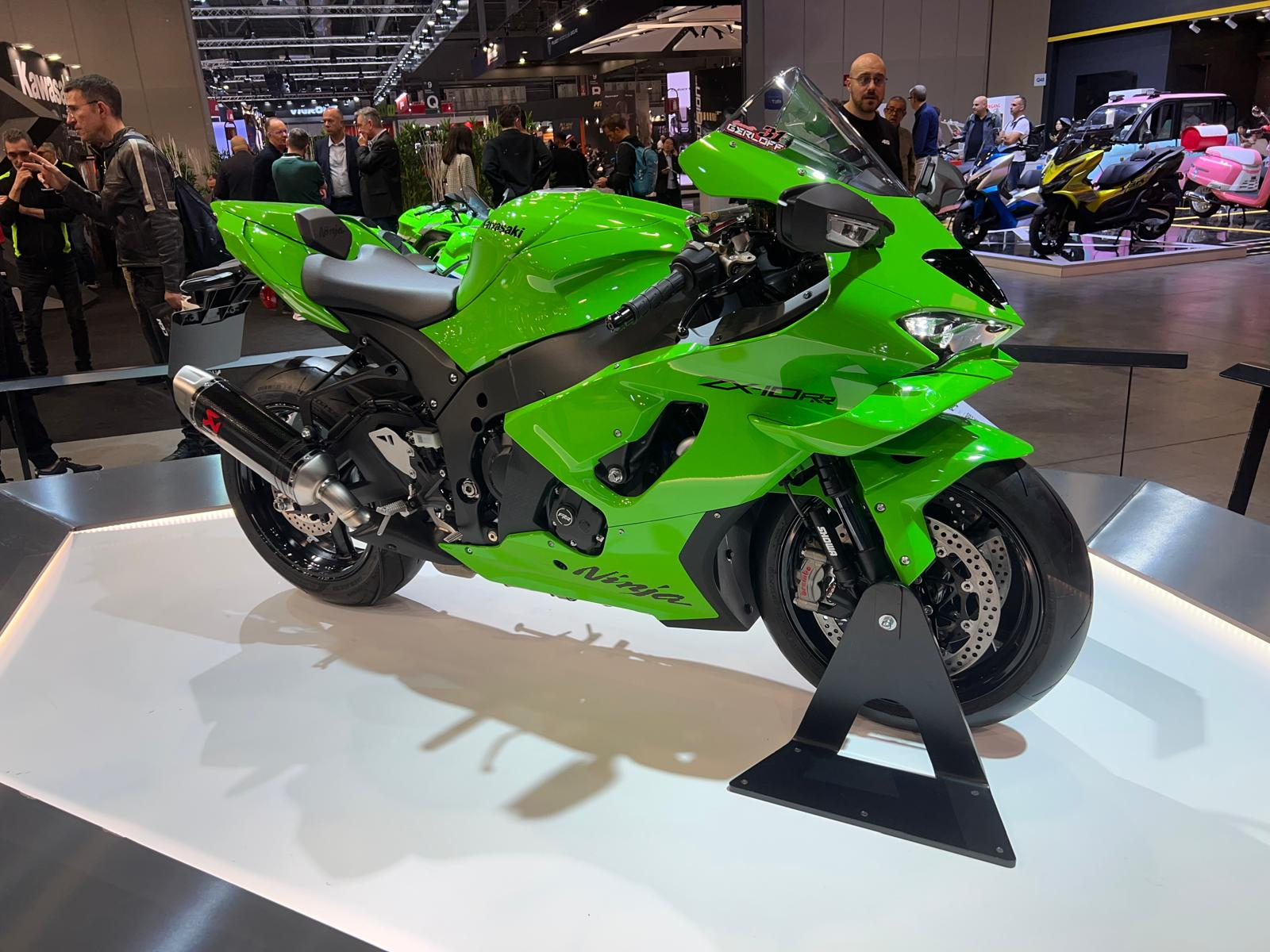
- 2026 Kawasaki Ninja ZX-10RR
- Manufacturer: Kawasaki Motors
- Parent company: Kawasaki Heavy Industries
- Production: 1984–present
- Class: Sport bike

The Kawasaki Ninja is a name given to several series of Kawasaki sport bikes that started with the 1984 GPZ900R. Kawasaki Heavy Industries trademarked a version of the word Ninja in the form of a wordmark, a stylised script, for use on "motorcycles and spare parts thereof".

== Ninja H2 ==
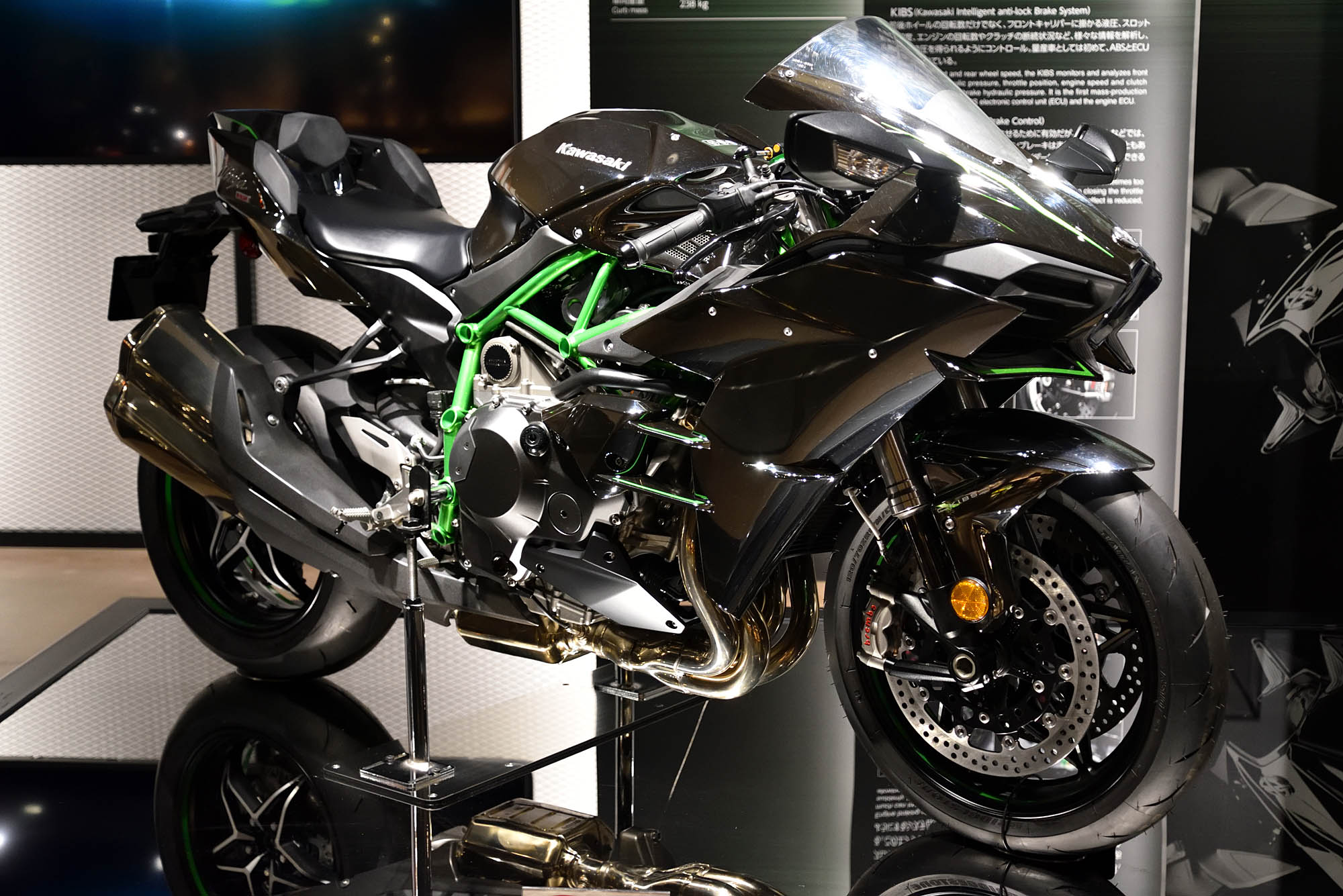
2015 Kawasaki Ninja H2

- Kawasaki Ninja H2 SX (since 2018)
- Kawasaki Ninja H2 (since 2015)

== Ninja ZX-R ==
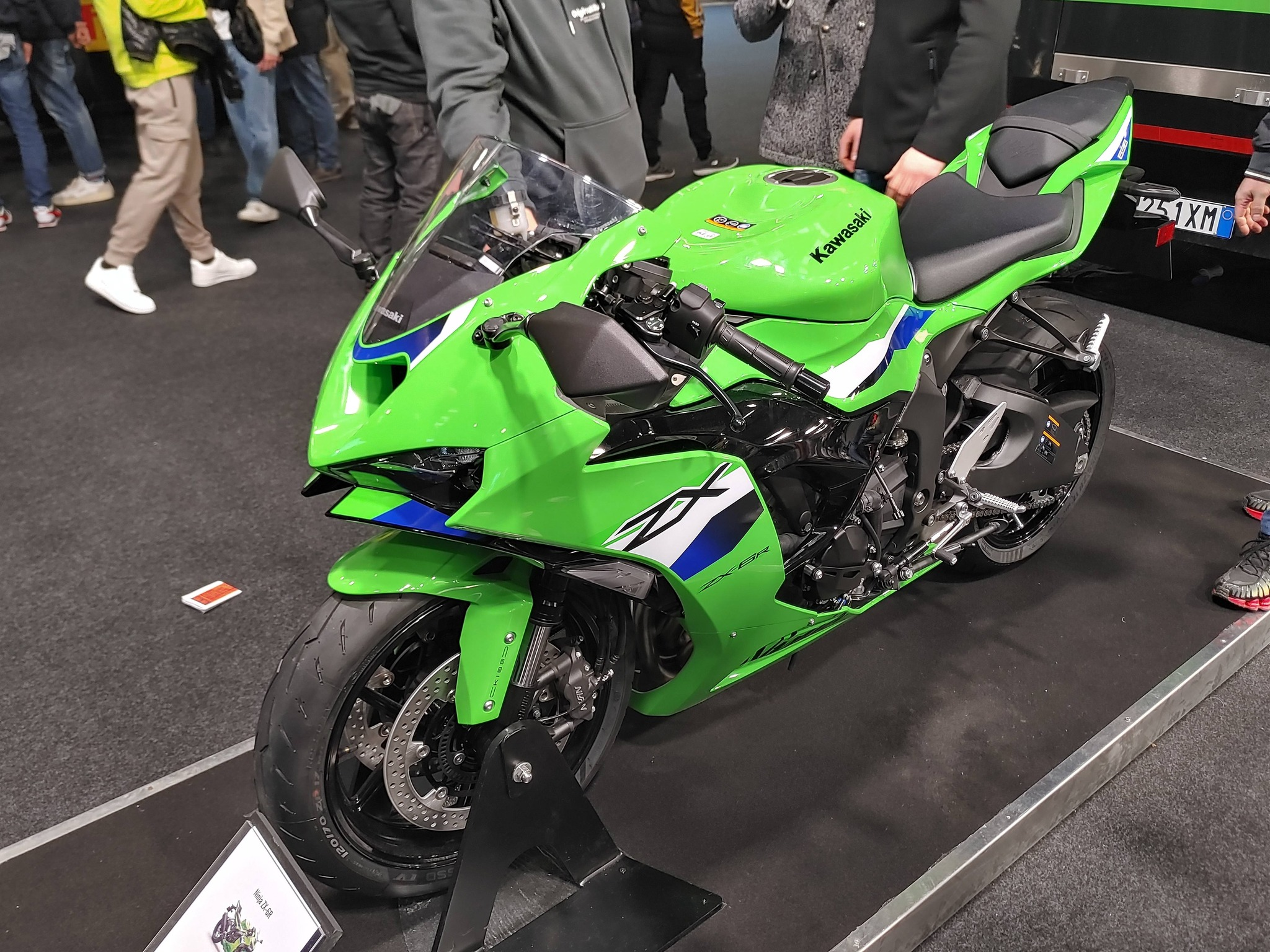
2026 Kawasaki Ninja ZX-6R

- Kawasaki Ninja ZX-14 (since 2006)
- Kawasaki Ninja ZX-12R (2000–2006)
- Kawasaki Ninja ZX-11 (1990–2001)
- Kawasaki Ninja ZX-10 (1988–1990)
- Kawasaki Ninja ZX-10R (since 2004)
- Kawasaki Ninja ZX-9R (1994–2003)
- Kawasaki Ninja ZX-7R/ZXR750 (1986–2003)
- Kawasaki Ninja ZX-6 (1990–2008)
- Kawasaki Ninja ZX-6R (since 1995)
- Kawasaki Ninja ZX-4R (since 2023)
- Kawasaki Ninja ZX-4R/ZXR400 (1989–2003)
- Kawasaki Ninja ZX-25R (since 2020)
- Kawasaki Ninja ZX-2R/ZXR250 (1989–2004)

== Base models ==
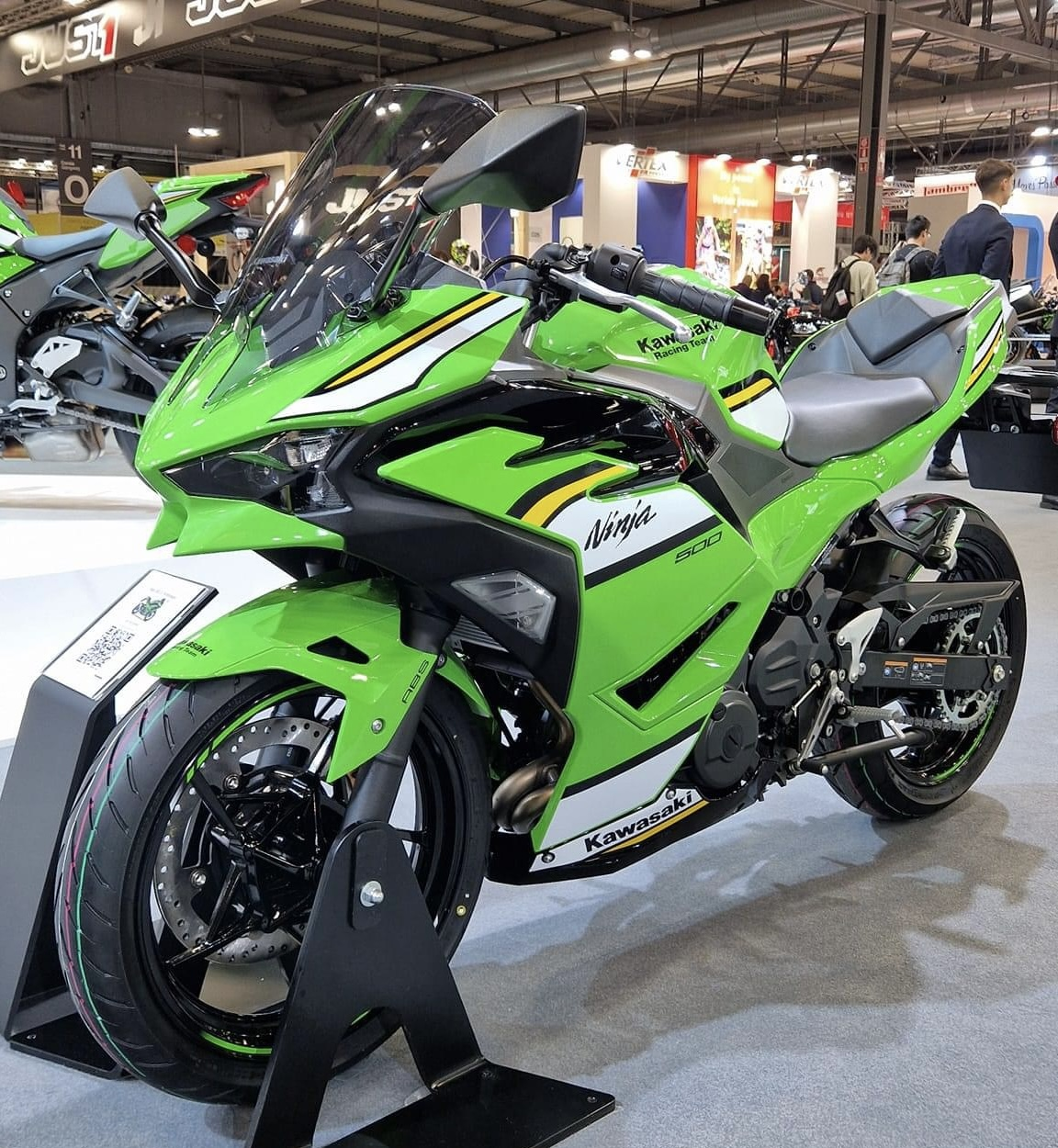
2025 Kawasaki Ninja 500 SE

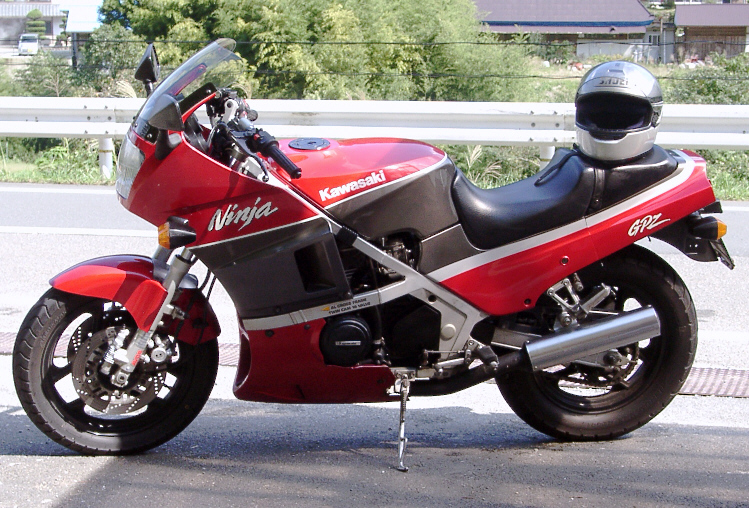
1984 Kawasaki Ninja GPZ400R

- Kawasaki Ninja 1100SX (since 2024)
- Kawasaki Ninja 1000 (since 2011)
- Kawasaki Ninja 1000R (1986–1988)
- Kawasaki Ninja 900 (1983–2003)
- Kawasaki Ninja 650 (since 2006)
- Kawasaki Ninja 600R (1985–1997)
- Kawasaki Ninja 500 SE (since 2024)
- Kawasaki Ninja 500R (1986-2009)
- Kawasaki Ninja 400 (since 2018)
- Kawasaki Ninja 400R (2011–2017)
- Kawasaki Ninja GPZ400R (1985–1990)
- Kawasaki Ninja 300 (since 2013)
- Kawasaki Ninja 250R (since 1986)
- Kawasaki Ninja 250SL (since 2015)

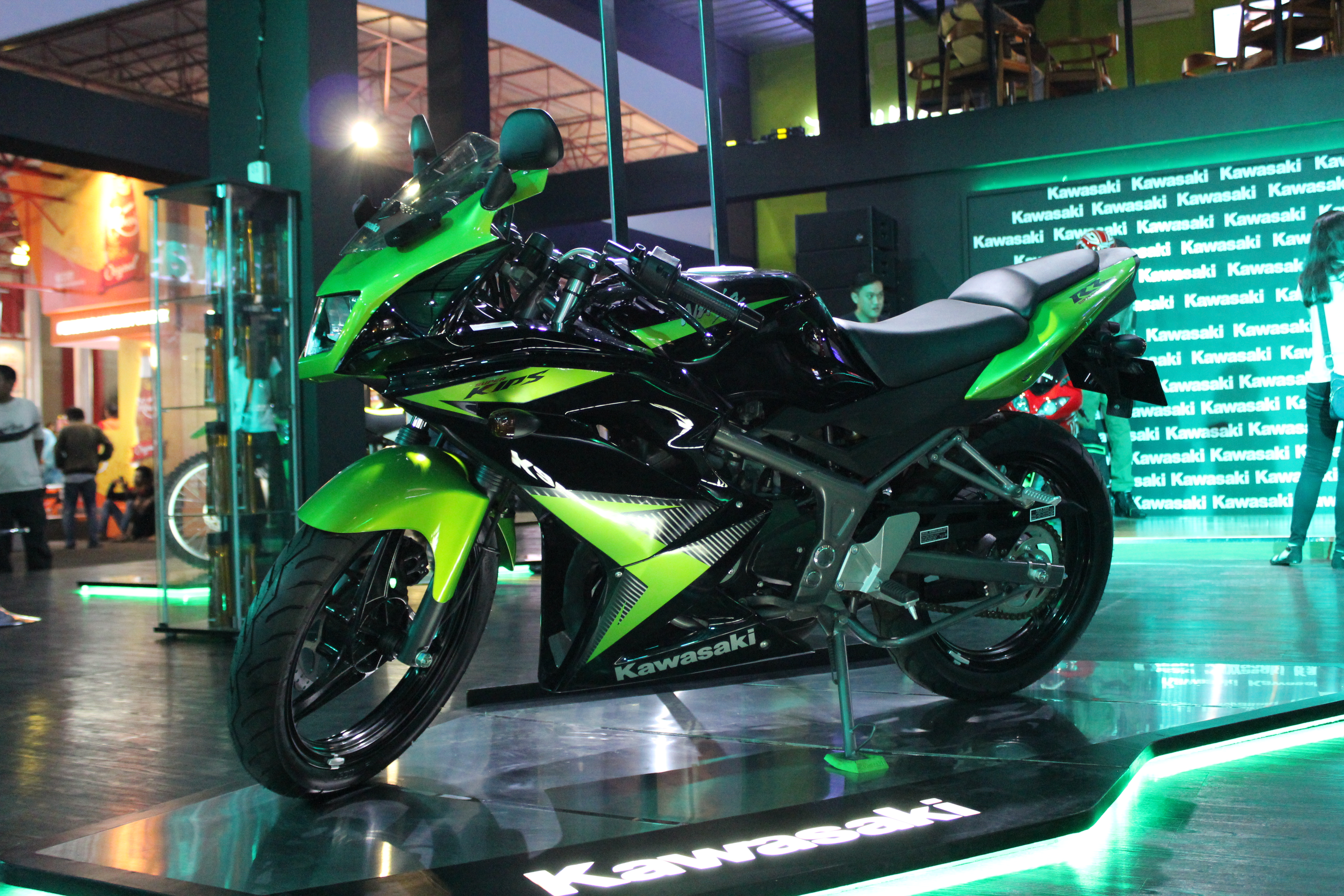
2015 Kawasaki Ninja RR 150

- Kawasaki Ninja 150RR (1989–2015)
- Kawasaki Ninja 125 (since 2018)

== Racing models ==
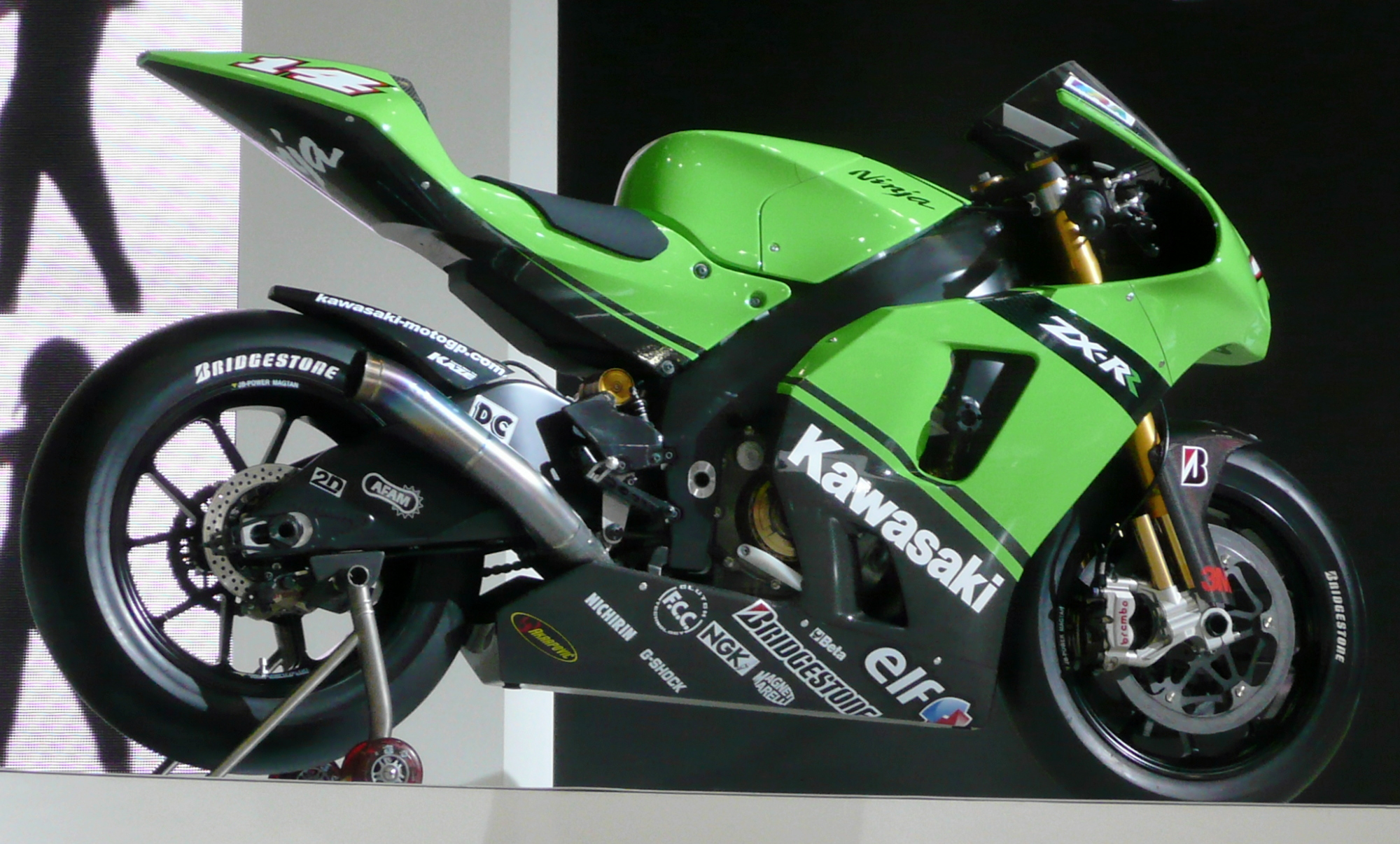
2007 Kawasaki Ninja ZX-RR MotoGP race bike

- Kawasaki Ninja H2R (since 2015)
- Kawasaki Ninja ZX-RR (2002–2009) MotoGP

== Electric/Hybrid ==
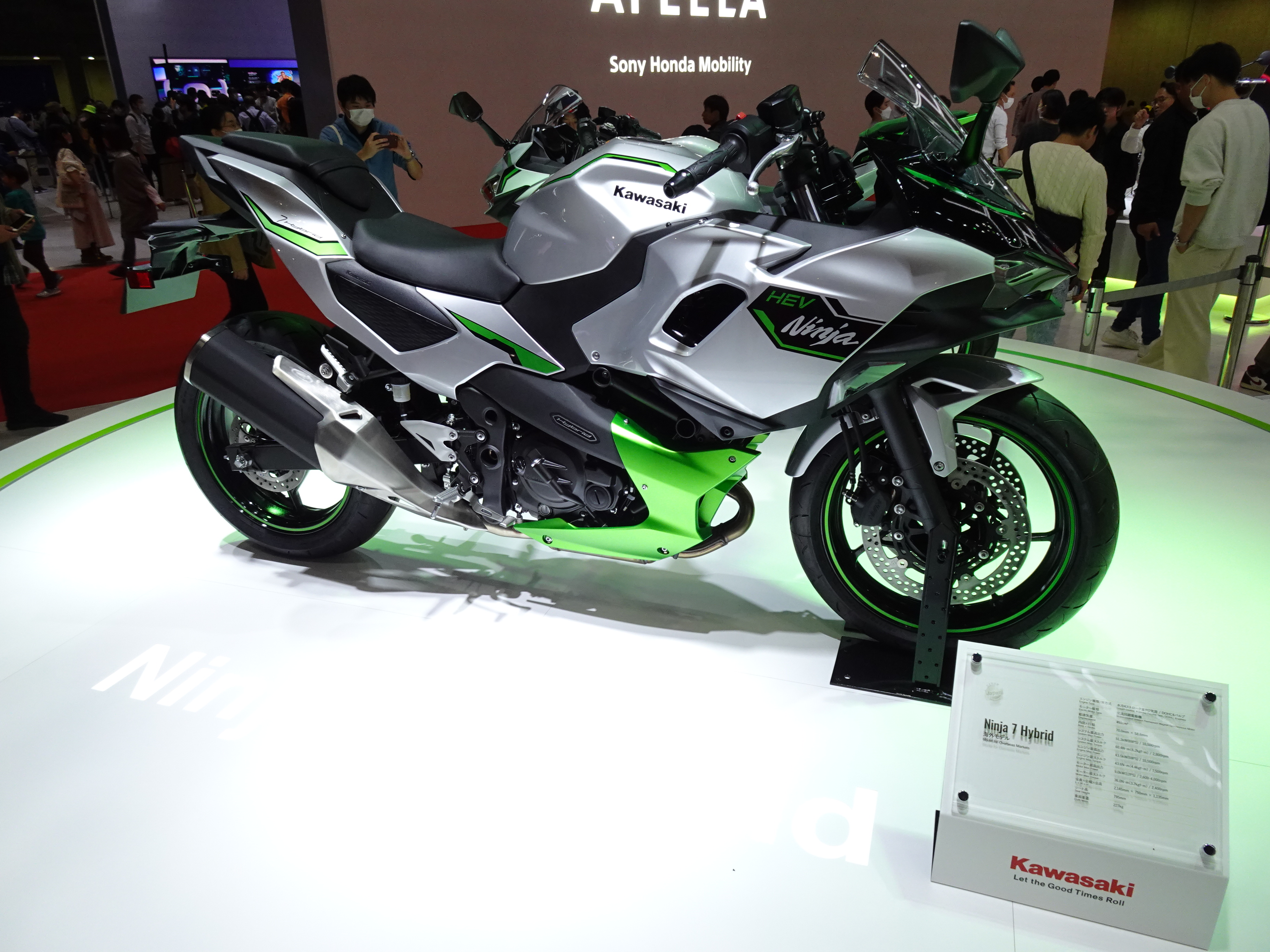
2023 Kawasaki Ninja 7 Hybrid

- Kawasaki Ninja e-1
- Kawasaki Ninja 7 Hybrid (since 2023)

== See also ==
- Kawasaki GPZ series
- Kawasaki Z series
- Kawasaki ZZR series
