= Kawasaki ZZ-R400 =

Motorcycle made by Kawasaki, 1990–2002

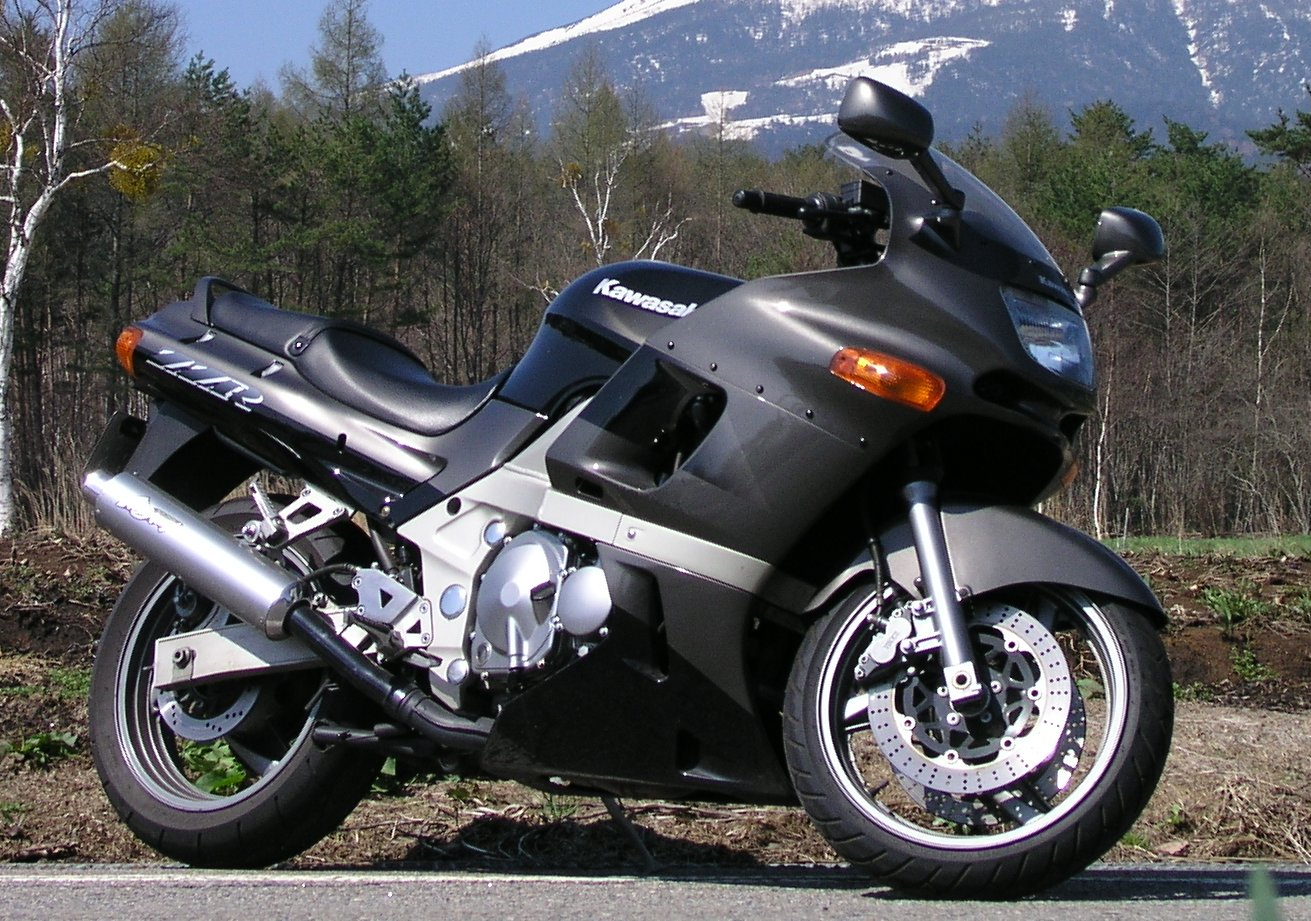
- Manufacturer: Kawasaki Motorcycle & Engine Company
- Parent company: Kawasaki Heavy Industries
- Production: 1990–2007
- Class: Sport bike
- Engine: 399 cc (24.3 cu in) four-stroke, liquid-cooled, 16-valve, DOHC
- Dimensions: L: 2,070 mm (81.5 in); W: 695 mm (27.4 in)
- Seat height: 780 mm (30.7 in)
- Weight: 195 kg (430 lb) (dry)
- Fuel capacity: 18 L (4.0 imp gal; 4.8 US gal)
- Related: Kawasaki ZZ-R600

The Kawasaki ZZ-R400 is a touring-oriented sport bike of the ZZ-R series produced by Kawasaki from 1990 until 2007. Developed specifically for the Japanese market, it was sold together with the ZZ-R600 and ZZ-R1100. It was a lower displacement version of the ZZ-R600, with smaller bore and shorter stroke. This meant that it was somewhat large and heavy for the 400 cc class, but it also made it more stable and comfortable than its competitors.

There were two main models; the initial K type was built from 1990 until 1993, when it was replaced by the N type. For the Japanese market, the model change coincided with a legal change, limiting maximum power for the 400 cc class, meaning that power dropped from 58 to 53 PS (43 to 39 kW). Power dropped again with the ZZR400-N8, due to stricter emissions regulations.
