= Kawasaki ZZR series =

Kawasaki ZZR, sometimes stylized ZZ-R, refers to a series of motorcycles produced by Kawasaki Heavy Industries Motorcycle & Engine from 1990 to 2020.

Motorcycles in this series include:

- Kawasaki ZZ-R1400
- Kawasaki ZZ-R1200
- Kawasaki ZZ-R1100
- Kawasaki ZZ-R600
- Kawasaki ZZ-R400
- Kawasaki ZZ-R250

== See also ==
- Kawasaki Ninja
- Kawasaki GPZ series
- Kawasaki Z series
- List of Kawasaki motorcycles
- ZZR (disambiguation)
