= Kawasaki Ninja ZX-10 =

Kawasaki Ninja ZX-10 may refer either of two 1,000 cc class Kawasaki sport bikes:

- Kawasaki Tomcat ZX-10, made 1988–1990
- Kawasaki Ninja ZX-10R, made since 2004
