= Kawasaki Concours =

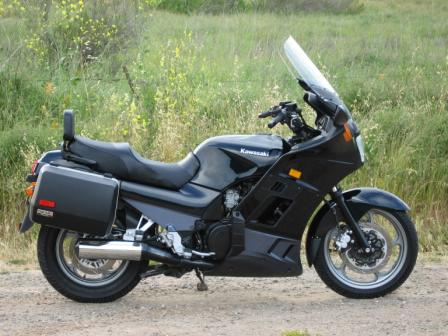
- Manufacturer: Kawasaki Motorcycle & Engine Company
- Also called: Kawasaki GTR1000/ZG1000
- Parent company: Kawasaki Heavy Industries
- Production: 1986–2006
- Successor: Kawasaki 1400GTR (Concours 14)
- Class: Sport touring
- Engine: 997 cc, Liquid cooled, 4-stroke, DOHC, 16-valve L4
- Bore / stroke: 74.0 mm × 58.0 mm (2.91 in × 2.28 in)
- Transmission: 6 speed, shaft drive
- Tires: Front: 120/70VR18; Rear: 150/80VR16
- Rake, trail: 28.5°, 4.84 in (123 mm)
- Wheelbase: 61.2 in (1,554 mm)
- Seat height: 31.0 in (787 mm)
- Weight: 671.5 lb (304.6 kg) (wet)
- Fuel capacity: 7.53 US gal (28.5 L; 6.27 imp gal)

The Kawasaki Concours, known as the GTR1000 in some markets, is a 1,000 cc sport touring motorcycle manufactured between 1986 and 2006 by Kawasaki. In 2007 it was replaced by the larger displacement Concours 14, also known as the 1400GTR.

== ZG1000 Concours ==
The Kawasaki Concours, known in Europe as the 1000GTR and in USA as the ZG1000, is a 997 cc, six speed, four cylinder, liquid-cooled sport touring motorcycle with shaft drive. The bike can reach speeds over 190 km/h (120 mph), offers nimble handling and – with its full fairing, tall screen, twin locking panniers, and 28 litres (6.2 imp gal; 7.4 US gal) fuel capacity – is suited to cross-country two-up touring.

Kawasaki introduced the Concours in 1986, based on their Ninja 900 and Ninja 1000R models. Key differences between the Ninja 1000R and the ZG1000 included 32 mm instead of 36 mm carburetors, less aggressively ramped cams, shaft drive, front and rear sub-frames, hard luggage, and full fairing. The Concours was introduced into the USA the year after the slightly faster (137 mph) BMW K100LT at less than two-thirds the price of the BMW machine. Both bikes were tested by the magazine Motorcyclist, which came out in favor of the Kawasaki concluding that it was "the most practical, useful and competent motorcycle made" and "superior to the BMW in almost every aspect imaginable."

From 1986 to 1993 the design was largely unchanged aside from modifications to the screen, handlebars and other very minor changes. In 1994 Kawasaki updated the instrument cluster, forks, controls, front fender, front brakes, and the front wheel. From 1994 to 2006, the design again experienced only minor changes: fork protectors and exhaust tips. As the Concours first generation endured with few revisions, experienced mechanics and used parts are readily available.

The 1000GTR has 10–20 percent less horsepower than the US Concours, varying by country.

== Successor ==
In September 2006, Kawasaki announced a new generation Concours, known as the Concours 14 in North America, and 1400GTR in other markets. Introduced in September 2007, the new bike is based on the ZX-14 platform with features similar to the original Concours – an inline-4 engine, luggage, shaft drive and a full fairing.

== See also ==
- Suzuki GV1400 Cavalcade
- List of Kawasaki motorcycles
