= Kawasaki AR80K =

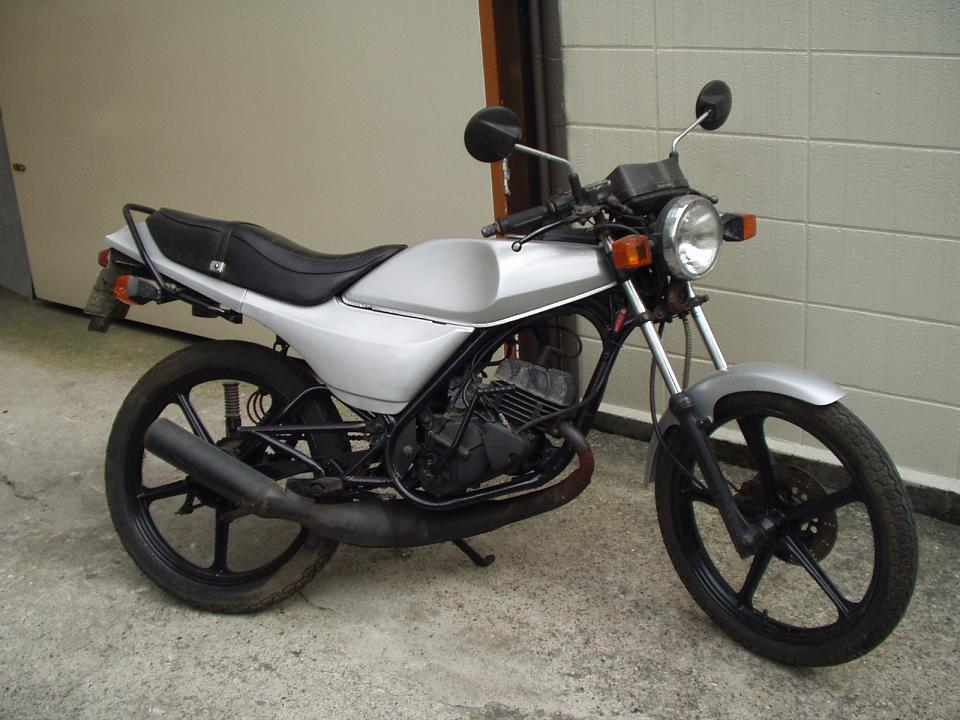
- Manufacturer: Kawasaki Motorcycle & Engine Company
- Also called: Kawasaki Ninja 80R/RR (Malaysia); Kawasaki Micro Magnum (air-cooled) Magnum Liquid Cooled(Thailand); AR80LC (Philippines); AR80 Magnum Liquid Cooled (Uruguay & Argentina)
- Parent company: Kawasaki Heavy Industries
- Production: 1992-1998
- Predecessor: Kawasaki AR50/Kawasaki AR80F (air cooled model)
- Class: Sport bike
- Engine: 79.44 cc (4.8 cu in) liquid-cooled two-stroke single
- Bore / stroke: 47.0 mm × 45.8 mm (1.85 in × 1.80 in)
- Compression ratio: 7.5:1
- Ignition type: CDI
- Transmission: 6-speed constant mesh manual
- Frame type: Steel single-cradle
- Suspension: Front: telescopic fork Rear: swingarm with monoshock (UniTrak)
- Brakes: Front: Dual-piston caliper with single 230 mm (9.1 in) disc Rear: drum
- Tyres: Front: 2.75–17PR; Rear : 2.75–18PR
- Wheelbase: 1,196 mm (47.1 in)
- Dimensions: L: 1,815 mm (71.5 in); W: 610 mm (24 in); H: 1,055 mm (41.5 in)
- Fuel capacity: 8 L (1.8 imp gal; 2.1 US gal)

The Kawasaki AR80K, also called Ninja 80R/RR in Malaysia, Micro Magnum in Thailand, is a motorcycle manufactured between 1992 and 1998, by Kawasaki Motorcycle & Engine Company, a division of Kawasaki Heavy Industries. It is a two-stroke engined motorcycle with a 79.44 cc (4.848 cu in) displacement, 6-speed transmission and a top speed of 62 mph (100 km/h) (Kawasaki Motors / Manufacturer's figures). It is related to the Kawasaki AR50 and AR125

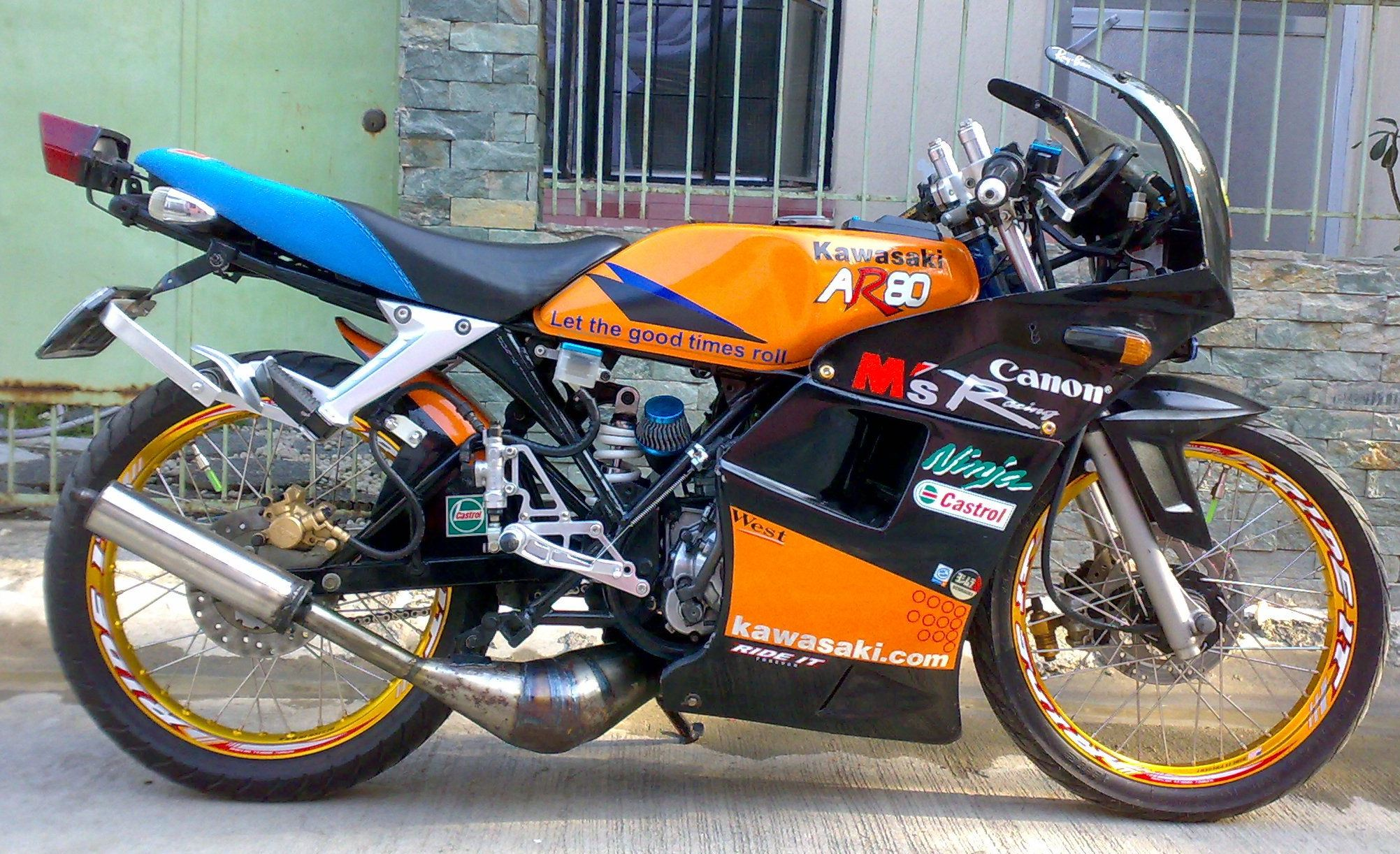
A modified version of the AR80K

== Overview ==
The bike was released in two different types, one is air-cooled, which was mainly sold in UK and Japan, and the other one is the liquid-cooled which were released mainly in South East Asian and Middle Eastern markets, although a model was also put on sale on South American countries (Argentina & Uruguay) as the AR-80 Magnum Liquid Cooled and ultimately leading to another variant, the Ninja 100RR or KS100, the Ninja 100RR was also sold in Malaysia, contrary to popular belief that the AR was still in production up to the year model 2003, this is not true, as they are just simply left over from dealerships. While the air-cooled models were released in various countries worldwide. The Kawasaki KSR-80 II (only sold in Japan) also shares the same engine format.

== See also ==
- Kawasaki Ninja series
