= Kawasaki Ninja 125 =

- Manufacturer: Kawasaki Motorcycle & Engine Company
- Parent company: Kawasaki Heavy Industries
- Production: 2018–present
- Assembly: Indonesia: Bekasi, West Java (Kawasaki Motor Indonesia)
- Class: Sport bike
- Engine: 125 cc liquid-cooled 4-stroke 4-valve DOHC single
- Bore / stroke: 58.0 mm × 47.2 mm (2.3 in × 1.9 in)
- Compression ratio: 11.7:1
- Power: 11 kW (15 PS) /10,000 rpm
- Torque: 11.7 N⋅m (8.6 lbf⋅ft) /7,700 rpm
- Transmission: 6 speed manual
- Frame type: Trellis with truss structure
- Tires: Front: 100/80-17M/C 52S; Rear: 130/70-17M/C 62S
- Wheelbase: 133 cm (52 in)
- Dimensions: L: 1,935 mm (76.2 in); W: 685 mm (27.0 in); H: 1,075 mm (42.3 in)
- Seat height: 785 mm (30.9 in)
- Related: Kawasaki Z125

The Kawasaki Ninja 125 is a motorcycle in the Ninja sport bike series from the Japanese manufacturer Kawasaki that was introduced in 2018. It is powered by a 125 cc (7.6 cu in) single-cylinder engine that produces a claimed 11 kW (15 PS).

It is the second Ninja sport bike to have a four-stroke single, after the Ninja 250SL.

== Z125 ==
Kawasaki Z125
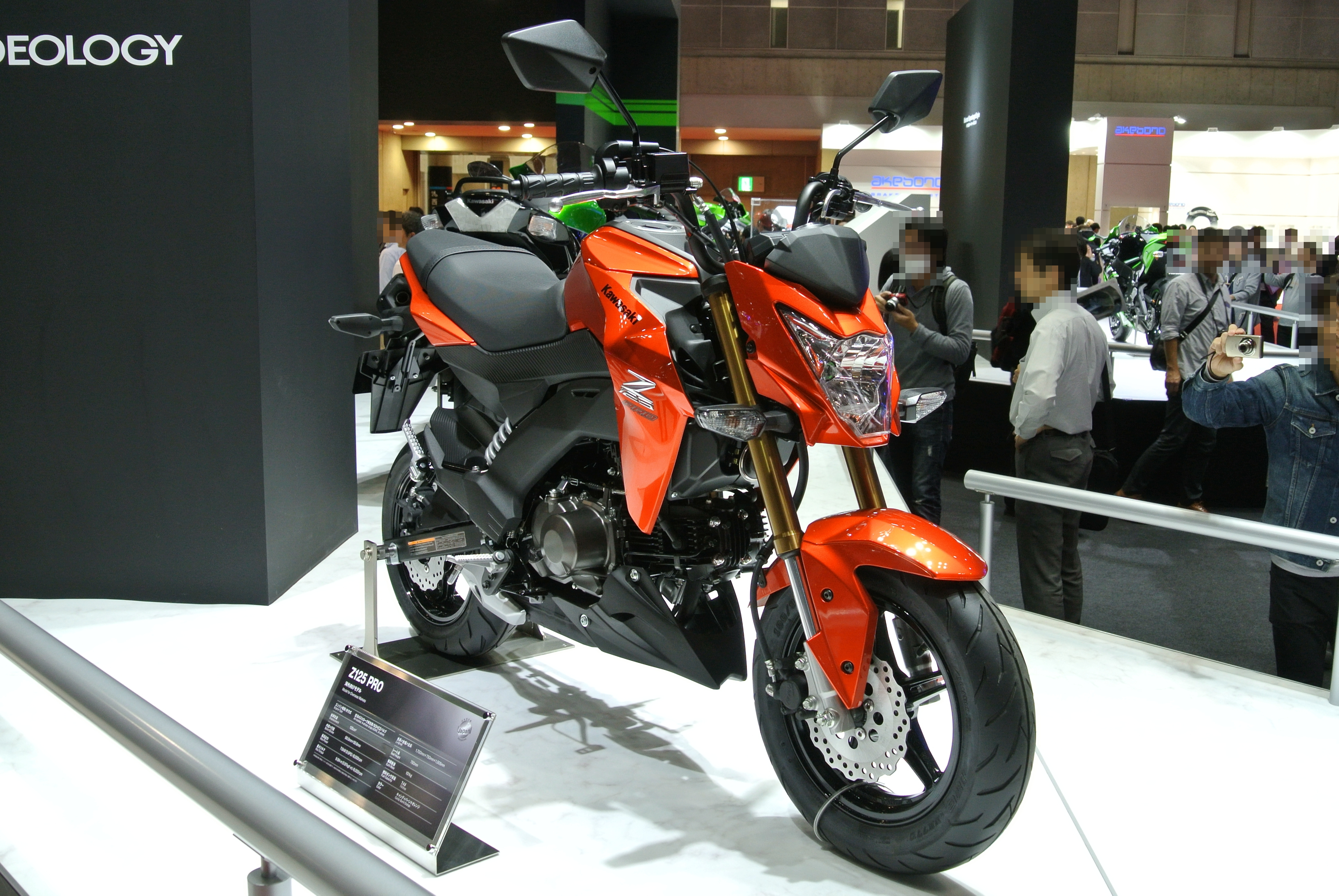
- Manufacturer: Kawasaki Motorcycle & Engine Company
- Parent company: Kawasaki Heavy Industries
- Production: 2018–present
- Assembly: Indonesia: Bekasi, West Java (Kawasaki Motor Indonesia)
- Class: Standard
- Engine: 125 cc liquid-cooled 4-stroke 4-valve DOHC single-cylinder
- Bore / stroke: 58.0 mm × 47.2 mm (2.3 in × 1.9 in)
- Compression ratio: 11.7:1
- Power: 15 PS (11 kW) @ 10,000 rpm
- Torque: 8.6 lb⋅ft (11.7 N⋅m) @ 7,700 rpm
- Frame type: Trellis with truss structure
- Tires: Front: 100/80-17M/C 52S; Rear: 130/70-17M/C 62S
- Dimensions: L: 1,935 mm (76.2 in); W: 740 mm (29.1 in); H: 1,015 mm (40.0 in)
- Seat height: 815 mm (32.1 in)
- Related: Kawasaki Ninja 125

The Kawasaki Z125 (codenamed BR125) is a Z series motorcycle introduced in 2018, and differing from the Ninja primarily in its trim. It is powered by a 125 cc (7.6 cu in) single-cylinder engine that produces a claimed 11 kW (15 PS).
