= Kawasaki GPZ900R =

Type of motorcycle

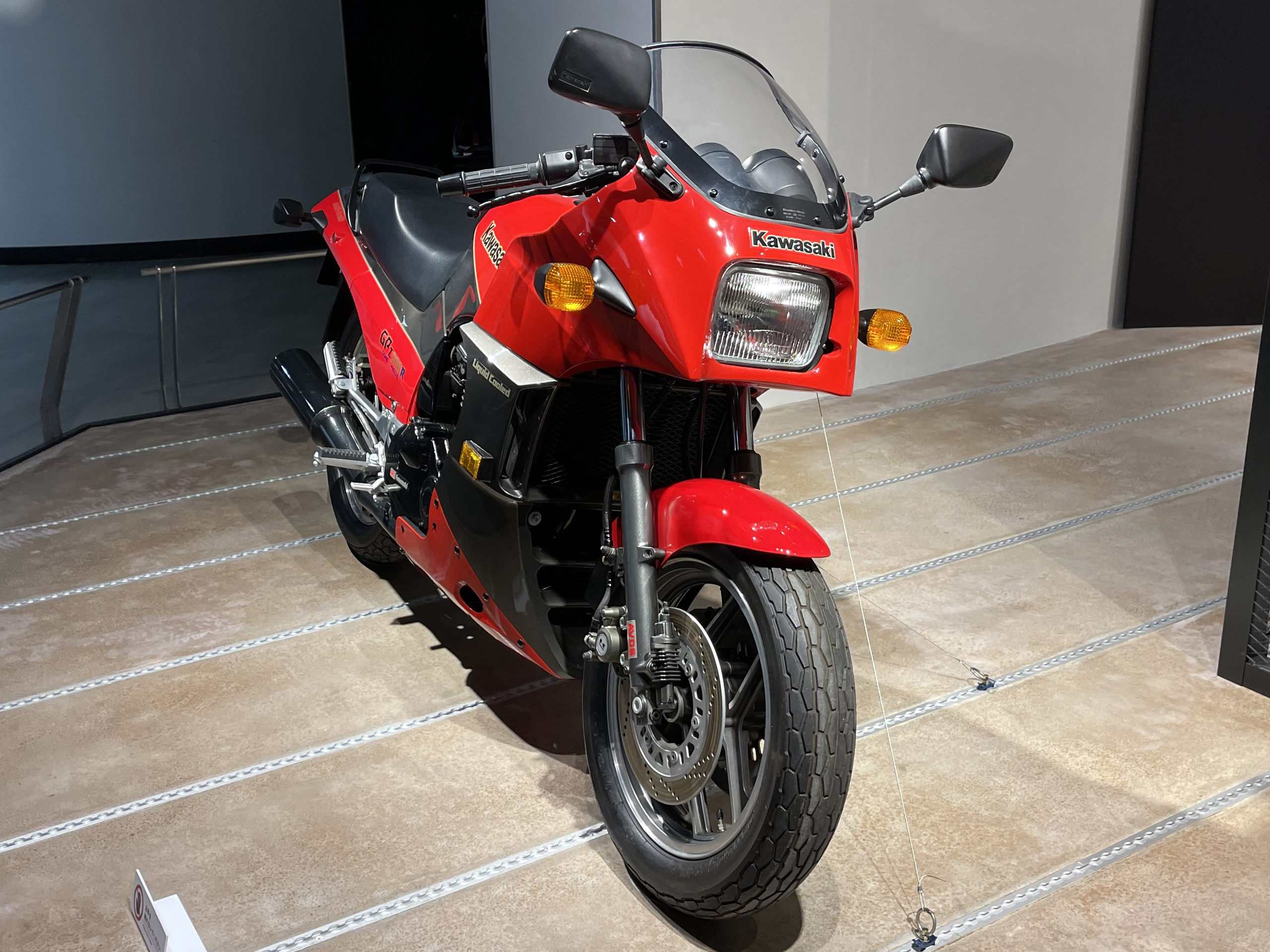
- Manufacturer: Kawasaki Motorcycle & Engine Company
- Also called: Kawasaki Ninja 900
- Parent company: Kawasaki Heavy Industries
- Production: 1984–2003
- Successor: Kawasaki GPZ1000RX; Kawasaki Ninja ZX-9R
- Class: Sport bike
- Engine: 908 cc (55.4 cu in), 4-stroke, transverse 4-cylinder, liquid-cooled, DOHC, 4-valve-per-cylinder
- Bore / stroke: 72.5 mm × 55 mm (2.85 in × 2.17 in)
- Top speed: 151 mph (243 km/h) 158 mph (254 km/h)
- Power: 115 bhp (86 kW) @ 9,500 rpm (1986) 108 bhp (81 kW) @ 9,500 rpm (1990 Europe) 100 bhp (75 kW) @ 9,500 rpm (1990 Europe) 89 bhp (66 kW) @ 9,000 rpm (1986 Japan)
- Torque: 85 N⋅m (63 lb⋅ft) @ 8,500 rpm 83 N⋅m (61 lb⋅ft) @ 8,500 rpm (Europe); 72 N⋅m (53 lb⋅ft) @ 6,500 rpm (Japan)
- Transmission: 6-speed constant mesh, return shift. Wet multi-disc clutch. Chain drive.
- Suspension: Front: telescopic fork, air Rear: Uni-Trak, air shock
- Brakes: Front: dual disc Rear: single disc
- Tires: Tubeless; 120/80-16 (front) (A1 - A6); 130/80-18 (rear) (A1 - A6); 120/70-17 (front) (A7-A8); 150/70-18 (rear) (A7 - A8)
- Rake, trail: 29°, 114 mm (4.5 in)
- Wheelbase: 1,495 mm (58.9 in)
- Dimensions: L: 2,200 mm (87 in); W: 750 mm (30 in); H: 1,215 mm (47.8 in)
- Seat height: 780 mm (31 in)
- Weight: 228 kg (503 lb); 249 kg (549 lb) (Europe) 234 kg (516 lb) (Europe) (dry)
- Fuel capacity: 22 L (4.8 imp gal; 5.8 US gal); Reserve: 4 L (0.88 imp gal; 1.1 US gal)
- Related: Kawasaki GPZ1000RX; Kawasaki GPZ750R

The Kawasaki GPZ900R (also known as the ZX900A or Ninja 900) is a motorcycle that was manufactured by Kawasaki from 1984 to 2003. It is the earliest member of the Ninja family of sport bikes. The 1984 GPZ900R (or ZX900A-1) was a revolutionary design that became the immediate predecessor of the modern-day sport bike. Developed in secret over six years, it was Kawasaki's and the world's first 16-valve liquid-cooled inline four-cylinder motorcycle engine.

The 908 cc four-cylinder engine delivered 115 bhp (86 kW), allowing the bike to reach speeds of 151 mph (243 km/h), making it the first stock road bike to exceed 150 mph (240 km/h). Additionally, some private owners recorded speeds in excess of 161.7 mph (262 km/h) in the outback of Australia after having run the engine in.

Prior to its design, Kawasaki envisioned producing a sub-liter engine that would be the successor to the Z1. Although its steel frame, 16-inch front and 18-inch rear wheels, air suspension, and anti-dive forks were fairly standard at that time, the narrow, compact engine was mounted lower in the frame, allowing it to take Japanese superbike performance to a new level. Six months after being unveiled to the press in December 1983, dealers entered three works GPZ900R bikes in the Isle of Man Production TT finishing in first and second places.

== Description ==
Technical advances included water cooling and 16 valves, allowing additional power, and a frame that used the engine as a stressed member for improved handling and reduced weight, as a result of testing that showed that the standard downtubes carried virtually no weight and could be eliminated. Its top speed gave it the title of the fastest production bike at the time, and standing quarter mile times of 10.976 seconds, or 10.55 seconds recorded by specialist rider Jay "Pee Wee" Gleason. The 1984 GPZ900R was the first Kawasaki bike to be officially marketed (in North America) under the Ninja brand name.

In spite of its performance, the GPZ900R was smooth and rideable in urban traffic, owing to the new suspension and a crankshaft counter-balancer that nearly eliminated secondary vibration. The fairing's aerodynamics combined with good overall ergonomics enabled comfortable long-distance riding.

The GPZ1000RX was to be the replacement for the GPZ900R in 1986, but the Ninja 900 continued alongside the GPZ 1000RX. In 1988 the GPZ 1000RX was replaced by the ZX-10, yet still the GPZ900R remained. With the release of the ZZ-R1100 in 1990, the GPZ900R lost its status as Kawasaki's flagship model, but continued, with some revisions of the fork, wheels, brakes and airbox, until 1993 in Europe, until 1986 in the US and until 2003 in Japan.

The GPZ900R was featured in the movie Top Gun, becoming a cultural icon.

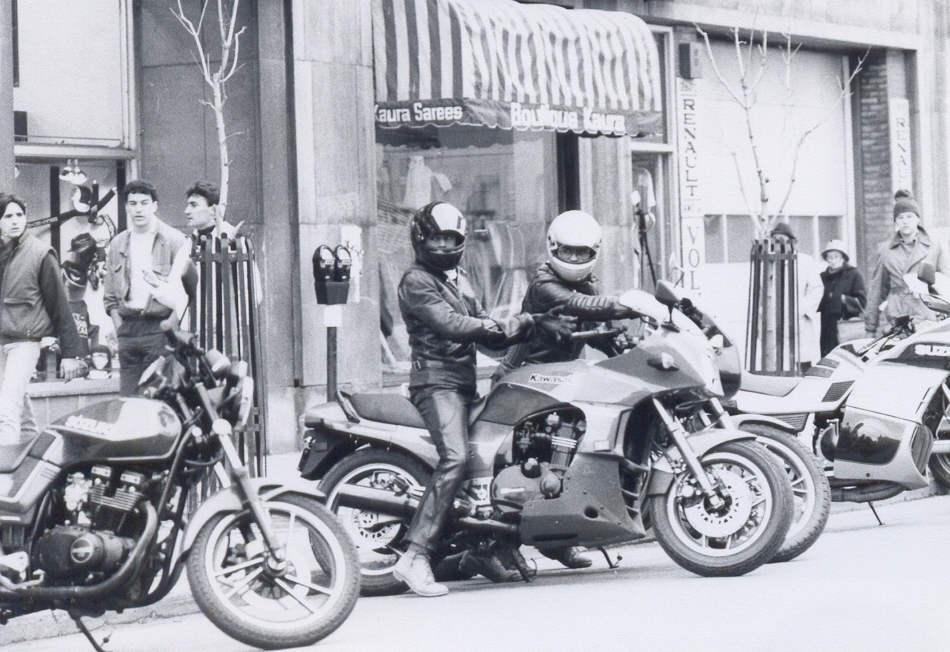
GPZ900 in Montreal in 1987

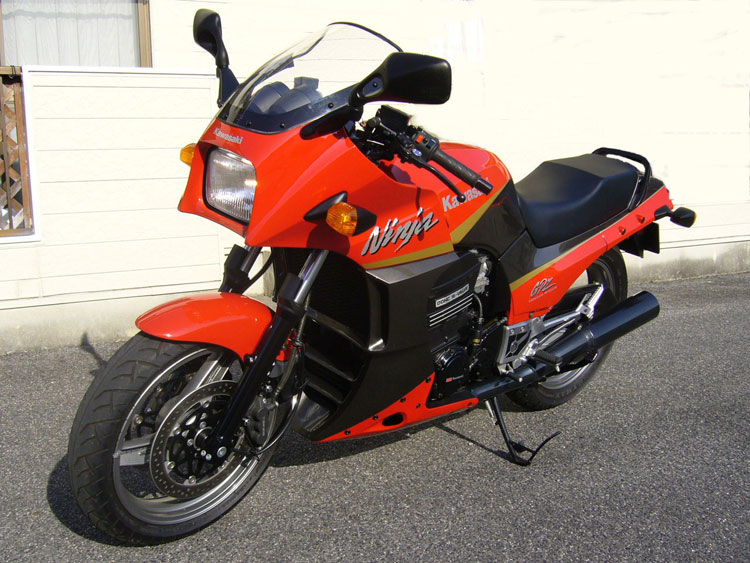
2003 GPz900R Final Edition

== Notes ==
Records
Preceded by Kawasaki GPZ750 Turbo	Fastest production motorcycle 1984–1988	Succeeded by Kawasaki GPZ1000RX (Ninja 1000R)
