= Kawasaki Ninja ZX-25R =

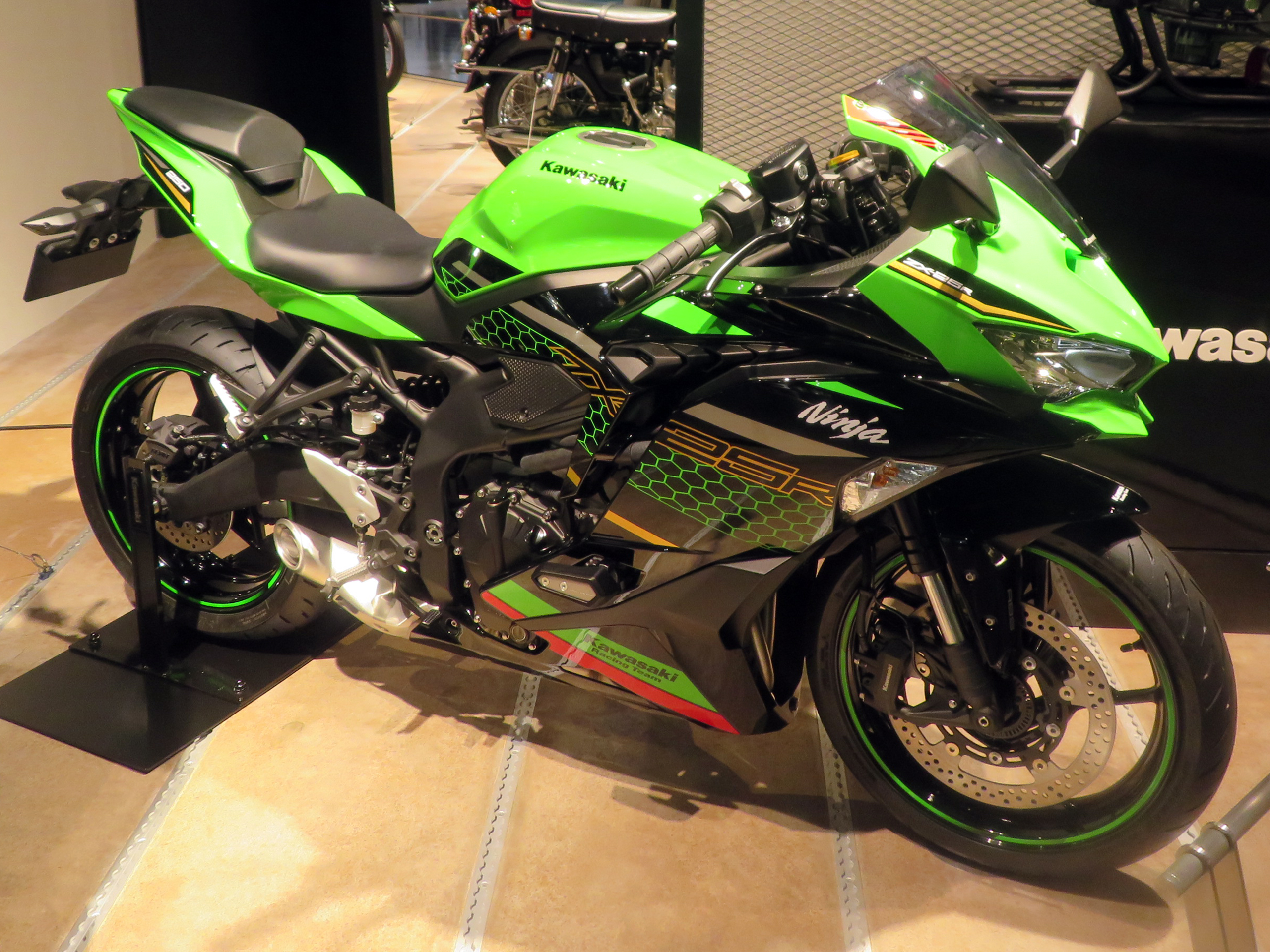
- Manufacturer: Kawasaki Motorcycle & Engine Company
- Parent company: Kawasaki Heavy Industries
- Production: 2020–present
- Assembly: Thailand; Indonesia
- Predecessor: Kawasaki ZXR250/Ninja ZX-2R
- Class: Sport bike
- Engine: 249 cc (15.2 cu in) liquid-cooled 4-stroke 16-valve DOHC Inline Four
- Bore / stroke: 50 mm × 31.8 mm (2.0 in × 1.3 in)
- Compression ratio: 11,5:1
- Power: 43.5 hp (32.4 kW) @ 15500 rpm
- Torque: 21.2 N⋅m (15.6 lbf⋅ft) @ 13000 rpm
- Transmission: Six-speed, chain drive
- Frame type: Steel diamond with truss structure
- Suspension: Front: telescopic fork
- Brakes: Front: Four-piston caliper with single 310 mm (12.2 in) disc Rear: Single-piston caliper with single 220 mm (8.7 in) disc
- Tires: Front: 110/70–17 (tubeless); Rear: 150/60–17 (tubeless)
- Weight: 180–184 kg (397–406 lb) (wet)
- Related: Kawasaki Ninja ZX-4R

The Kawasaki Ninja ZX-25R is a 249 cc Ninja series sport bike introduced by the Japanese motorcycle manufacturer Kawasaki since 2020.

== Description ==
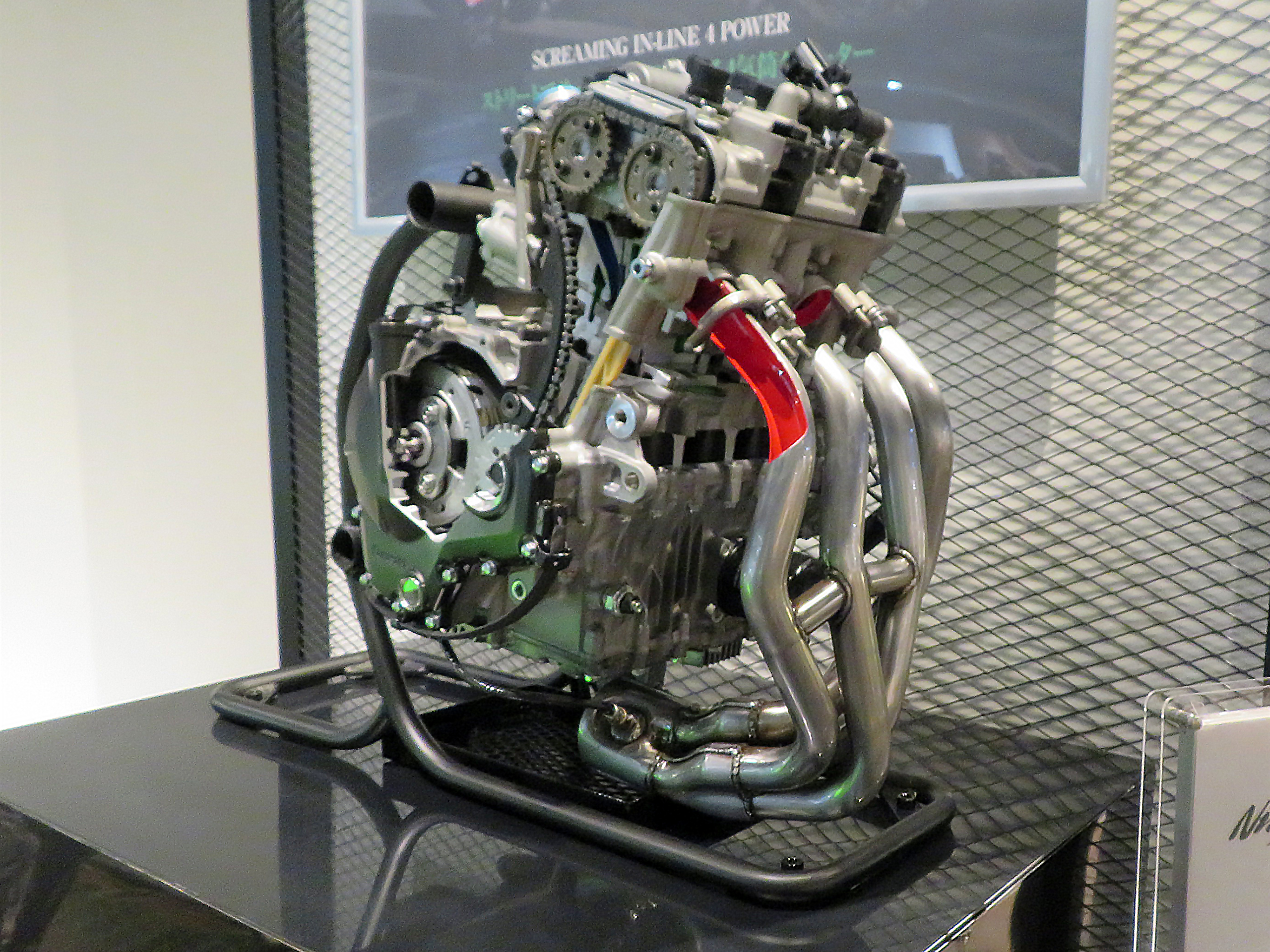
The 249 cc in-line four-cylinder engine used in the ZX-25R

The bike is characterized by having a 249 cc in-line four-cylinder engine, therefore an engine with a very small volume but with a multi-cylinder fractionation. The engine is mounted in front of the gear and is powered by a multipoint indirect electronic injection system with DOHC distribution and 16 valves, four for each cylinder; delivers about 50 HP and can reach 17,000 rpm. Power can be increased to 51 HP at 15,500 rpm with the aid of an air box, with maximum torque reaching 22.9 Nm (2.3 kgm) at 14,500 rpm.

It is produced in Indonesia and Thailand as a successor to the Ninja ZX-2R/ZXR250, which was produced between 1988 and 2004 (until 2004 in Malaysian market).This motorcycle was first shown at the Tokyo Motor Show in 2019, to then be launched on the Asian market on July 10, 2020.

2023 Kawasaki Ninja ZX-25RR

For the 2023, it has received many updates, including a new 4.3 inch TFT display panel, a preload adjustment for the front fork, (right fork leg only), smart phone connectivity via the Kawasaki Rideology App. There is also an RR variant, the only difference is the rear shock which uses the Showa BFRC Lite rear shock, fully adjustable with preload, rebound and compression, (the ZX-4RR and the 2021-2025 ZX-10R uses the same rear shock).
