= Kawasaki 1400GTR =

Kawasaki 1400GTR / Concours 14
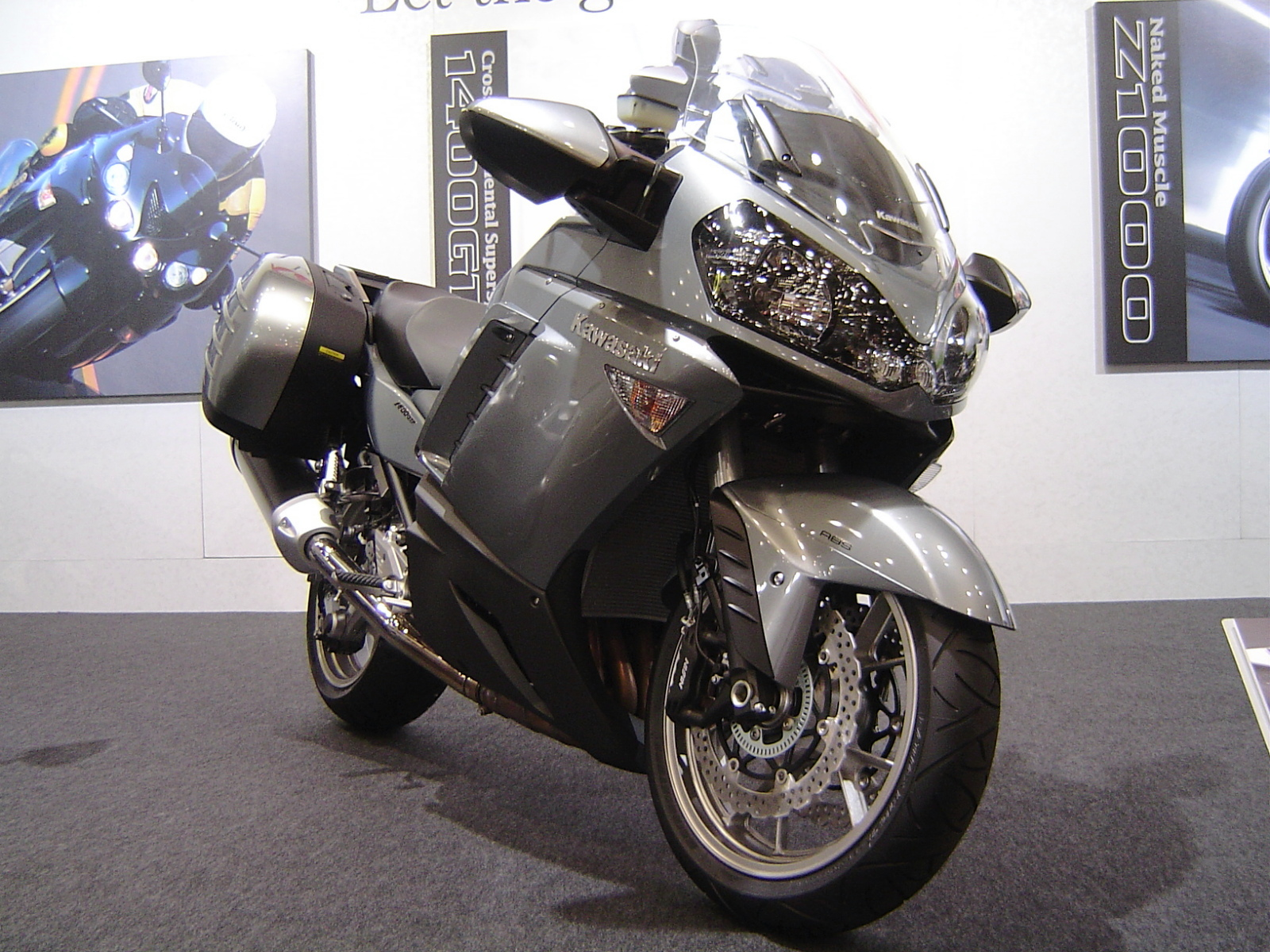
- Manufacturer: Kawasaki Motorcycle & Engine Company
- Also called: Kawasaki Concours 14 / 1400GTR / ZG1400
- Parent company: Kawasaki Heavy Industries, MHI
- Production: 2007 (MY2008) - 2022
- Predecessor: Kawasaki Concours (GTR1000)
- Class: Sport touring
- Engine: 1,352 cc inline 4-cylinder
- Bore / stroke: 84.0 mm × 61.0 mm (3.31 in × 2.40 in)
- Compression ratio: 10.7:1
- Top speed: Early models 186 mph (299 km/h) Late models 152.8 mph (245.9 km/h)
- Power: 114 kW (153 hp) @ 8,800 rpm 117.6 kW (157.7 hp) with ram-air @ crank
- Torque: 136 N⋅m (100 lbf⋅ft) @ 6,200 rpm
- Transmission: 6-speed, shaft drive optional traction control (2010–)
- Frame type: Aluminium monocoque
- Brakes: Front: Dual 310 mm discs, radial-mount opposed 4-piston callipers Rear: 270 mm disc, opposed 2-piston calliper optional ABS
- Tyres: Front: 120/70ZR17M/C (58W); Rear: 190/50ZR17M/C (73W)
- Rake, trail: 26.1°, 112 mm (4.4 in)
- Wheelbase: 1,520 mm (60 in)
- Dimensions: L: 2,230 mm (88 in); W: 790 mm (31 in); H: 1,345 mm (53.0 in)
- Seat height: 815 mm (32.1 in)
- Weight: 615 lb (279 kg) (dry); 304 kg (670 lb) (wet)
- Fuel capacity: 22 L (4.8 imp gal; 5.8 US gal)
- Fuel consumption: 37 mpg_{‑US} (6.4 L/100 km; 44 mpg_{‑imp})
- Related: Kawasaki Ninja ZX-14

The Kawasaki 1400GTR, also known as the Concours 14 or ZG1400 in some markets, is a sport touring motorcycle produced by Kawasaki. The 1400GTR was introduced in September 2007 and is based on the ZX-14 platform. It replaces the original GTR1000 (Concours), which was built from 1986 to 2006.

== Etymology ==
The American model name "Concours" is derived from a gathering of prestigious vehicles in a contest of elegance, such as the French Concours d'Elegance and is pronounced with a silent s, /kawn-koor/.

== Technology ==
The engine is a transverse-mounted 16-valve inline-four with a displacement of 1,352 cc (82.5 cu in). It has variable valve timing, derived from a Mitsubishi Motors car engine, which allows the phasing of the intake camshaft to be advanced by up to 24°. This continuous alteration happens progressively as the rpm rise and fall.

The fuel injected engine on the 2008 and 2009 models has a power output of 114 kW (153 hp) at 8,800 rpm and produces torque of 136 N⋅m (100 lbf⋅ft) at 6,200 rpm. The ram-air intake increases power to 117.6 kW (157.7 hp).

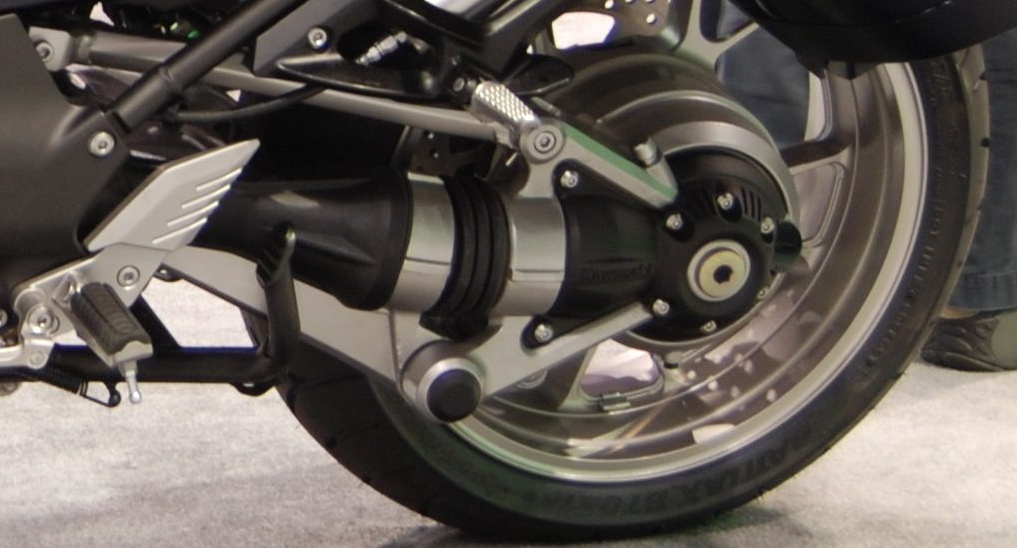
Tetra Lever rear drive system

The bike's rear suspension-drive system is known as Tetra-Lever and is similar to the BMW Paralever and Moto Guzzi CARC systems. It is designed to handle the conflicting drive and suspension forces (known as shaft effect) typical when shaft-driven motorcycles carry powerful engines.

Both the original Concours and the Concours 14 have a slipper clutch that lets the rear wheel freewheel to lessen the risk of sliding when the rider uses excessive engine braking.

The 1400GTR is fitted with a keyless ignition, KIPASS (Kawasaki's Intelligent Proximity Activation Start System), which means that no key is needed to start the bike as long as the rider is carrying the coded transponder—typically in a pocket.

From launch the 1400GTR had the option of an anti-lock braking system (ABS). In 2010, Kawasaki added KTRC, a traction control system, and replaced the previous ABS systems with K-ACT (Kawasaki Advanced Coactive-braking Technology), an improved system with power-assisted brake force redistribution. K-ACT is also a combined braking system in which both the front and rear brakes are applied in differing amounts depending on whether the front brake lever or rear brake pedal is used. The rider is able to select, using a handlebar switch, the amount of front brake force applied when the rear brake pedal is used. The traction control uses the ABS sensors to detect when the front and rear wheel speeds differ—reducing rear wheel speed by telling the engine management system to reduce power output.

== Performance ==
Motorcycle Consumer News tested a 2011 Concours 14's top speed at 152.8 mph (245.9 km/h), and the bike's 0 to 1/4 mile (0.00 to 0.40 km) time at 10.56 seconds at 127.68 mph (205.48 km/h). They recorded a 0 to 60 mph (0 to 97 km/h) time of 2.91 seconds, and 0 to 100 mph (0 to 161 km/h) of 6.56 seconds. With ABS enabled they achieved a 60 to 0 mph (97 to 0 km/h) braking distance of 127.8 ft (39.0 m). With 135.61 hp (101.12 kW) at 8,750 rpm and a wet weight of 695.5 lb (315.5 kg), the power to weight ratio is 1:5.12.

== Model history ==
=== 2008-2009 ===
The 2008 model year was launched in late 2007.

=== 2010 ===
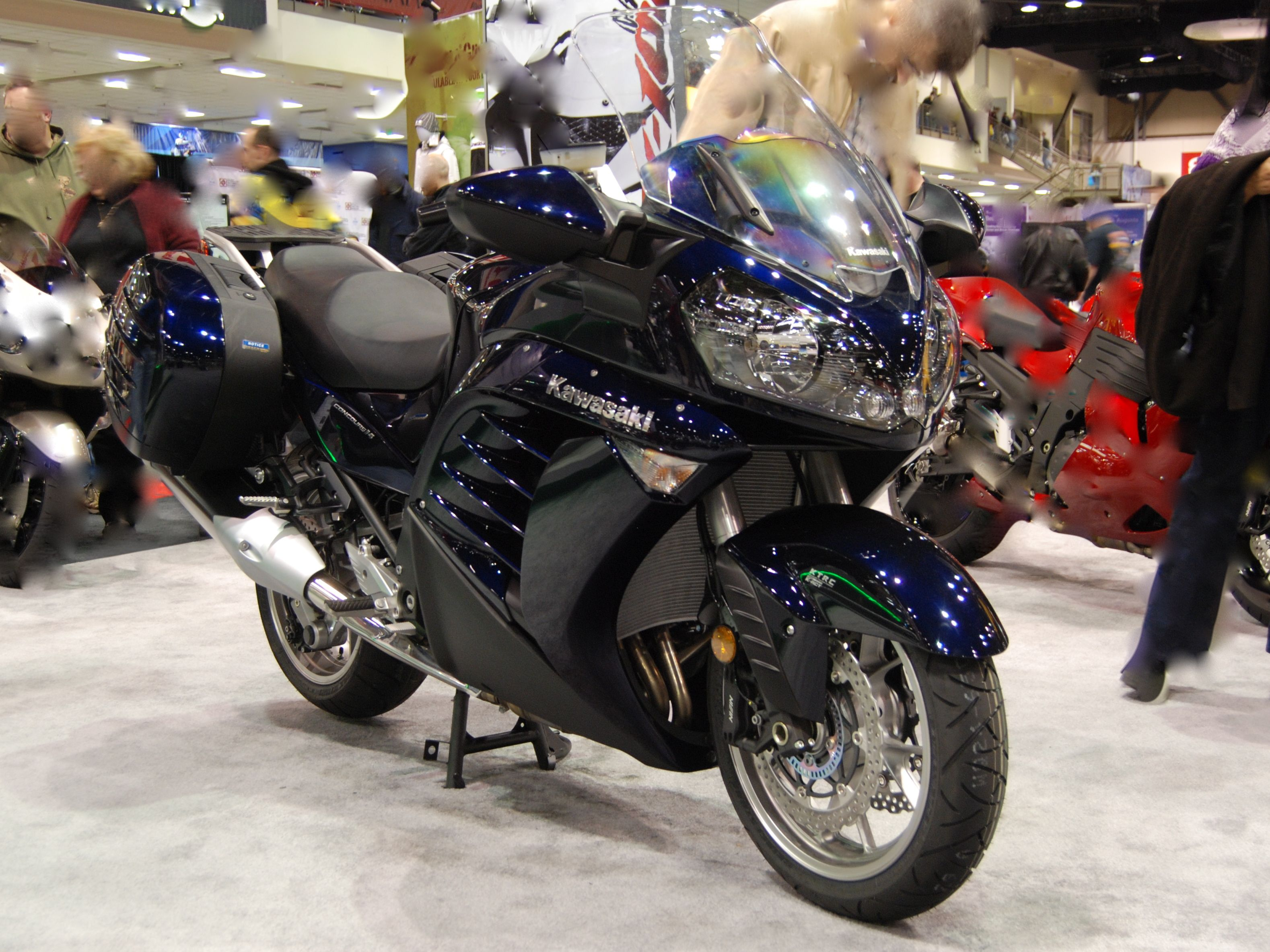
2010 model with revised fairing and higher mirrors

For 2010, Kawasaki made significant revisions including adding KTRC traction control and K-ACT ABS and brake assist, as well as linked brakes which are optional in some markets and standard in others. The 2010 model has revised bodywork to improve engine cooling and reduce engine heat to the rider, mirrors raised by 40 mm (1.6 in), the dashboard top was redesigned with vents to help relieve back pressure, a larger wind screen and with memory function and auto-lowering, a heat shield across the midsection of the exhaust pipe, a handlebar-mounted switch to control the dash computer, variable heated grips, an optional "Fuel Economy Assistance Mode" that tells the ECU to use a leaner, more economical air-fuel ratio only selectable less than 6,000 rpm and road speed less than 80 mph (130 km/h), an "Economical Riding Indicator" was added to the dashboard. The tank-mounted storage area was removed and replaced with an auto-locking glove box in the left fairing, the exhaust silencer cap was changed, the two color seat was replaced a single color model, the instrument cluster illumination was changed from red to white, an ambient outdoor temperature display option was added to the computer display, included key sets were changed from two active fobs/keys to one active fob/key and one passive mini fob/key, the front fork fluid levels were increased by 25ml, and the oil pan was modified so that the drain plug faces forward instead of downward to prevent damage. The ECU was programmed to limit top speed to 154 mph. The rear pannier covers were fully painted (instead of leaving a black area at the bottom). Many people refer to the 2010+ models as the 2nd generation (or "Gen 2") of the C14.

=== 2011 ===
No significant changes were made between the 2010 and 2011 models, although ABS became standard. The front rotors were slightly redesigned.

=== 2012-2014 ===
Starting with the 2012 model, the front rotors were changed slightly to have a smaller carrier to resist warping and Kawasaki started painting the wheels black instead of silver. In 2014, the tire pressure sensors were redesigned with "potted" circuit boards, making battery replacement impractical.

=== 2015-2017 ===
Kawasaki made numerous minor changes in 2015 that include a revised first gear ratio that is shorter to take advantage of the massive torque for smoother starts, revised fuel mapping to match the transmission and catalyzer changes, different steering stem seal for lighter steering at low speed, stiffer rear suspension for enhanced carrying capacity, an adjustable vent in the windshield, revised ABS programming to reduce the linked braking effect, a new rear luggage base, silver bezels on the analog dash meters, elongated mid-pipe heat shield, change of warning lamp color from red to yellow, tank pad, cushions on passenger pegs, and a revised seat that is narrower at the front with a flatter seat area that will allow riders to reach to the ground. There is also an Accessory Touring Seat for even greater comfort. The revised parts should all be backwards compatible with previous model years. Kawasaki also shifted the North American models to use the oxygen sensor that had previously only been used in the other world markets.

=== 2018-2022 ===
Unchanged. Starting with the 2018 model year, the 1400GTR (along with over a dozen Kawasaki models) was discontinued in the European, Asian, Australian, and Brazilian markets; remaining available only in the American, Canadian, and Latin American markets.

== Awards ==
- 2008: Rider Best Sport-Touring Bike and Motorcycle of the Year
- 2008: Cycle World Best Sport-Tourer
- 2009: Cycle World Best Sport-Tourer
- 2009: Motorcyclist Best Touring Bike
- 2010: Cycle World Best Sport-Touring Bike
- 2011: Motorcyclist Sport Tourer Shootout winner

== Police and ambulance use ==
In some countries the 1400GTR is used by police and ambulance services, although this is not factory-built by Kawasaki as an authorities machine, rather it is a local conversion.
