= ZZR =

ZZR may refer to:

- Kawasaki ZZR series of motorcycles
- Isuzu Gemini ZZ/R or ZZ-R
- Target allocation radar TPS-1E (German: Zielzuweisungsradar)
- A special vehicle in Out of Sight (1966 film)
- Zig Zag Railway, a heritage railway in New South Wales, Australia
