= Kawasaki Ninja ZX-4R =

Sports motorcycle

- Manufacturer: Kawasaki Motorcycle & Engine Company
- Also called: ZX-4RR
- Parent company: Kawasaki Heavy Industries
- Production: 2023–present
- Assembly: Thailand
- Predecessor: Kawasaki ZXR400/Ninja ZX-4R
- Class: Sport bike
- Engine: 399 cc (24.3 cu in) liquid-cooled 4-stroke 16-valve DOHC inline-four
- Bore / stroke: 57 mm × 39.1 mm (2.2 in × 1.5 in)
- Compression ratio: 12,3:1
- Top speed: 235 km/h (146 mph)
- Power: 56.7 kW (76.0 hp) @ 14500 rpm
- Torque: 37.6 N⋅m (27.7 lbf⋅ft) @ 12500 rpm
- Transmission: Six-speed, chain drive
- Frame type: Steel diamond with truss structure
- Suspension: Front: telescopic fork
- Brakes: Front: Four-piston caliper with double 290 mm (11.4 in) disc Rear: Single-piston caliper with single 220 mm (8.7 in) disc
- Tires: Front: 120/70–17 (tubeless); Rear: 160/60–17 (tubeless)
- Wheelbase: 1380 mm
- Weight: 188 kg (414 lb) (wet)
- Fuel capacity: 15 L (3.3 imp gal; 4.0 US gal)
- Related: Kawasaki Ninja ZX-25R; Bimota KB399

The Kawasaki Ninja ZX-4R is a 399 cc sports bike introduced by Japanese motorcycle manufacturer Kawasaki in 2023.

== Description ==
After some rumors and the announcement at the end of January, the bike was presented for the first time at the beginning of February 2023 in the United States, Asia and Australia.

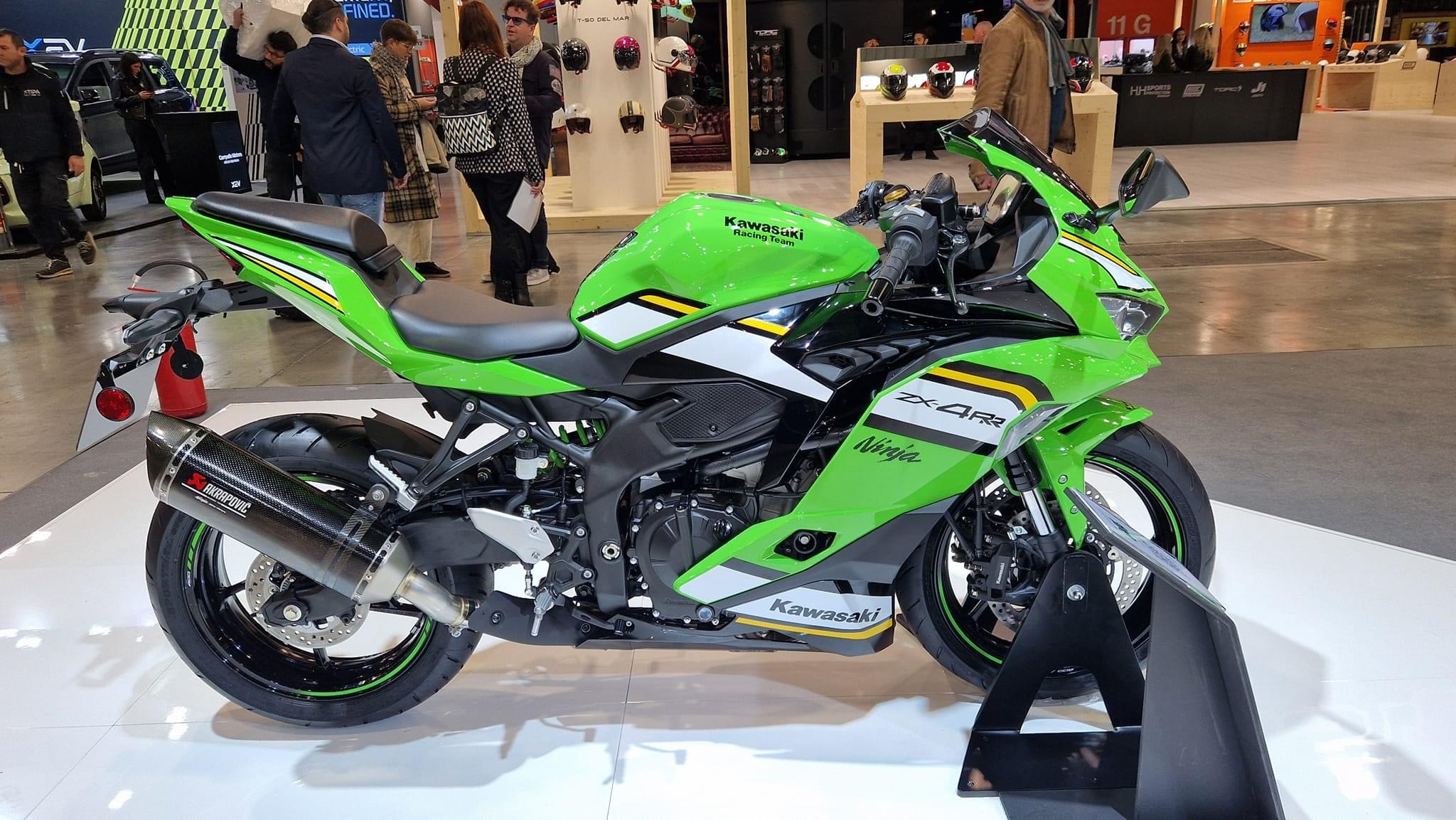
2024 Kawasaki Ninja ZX-4RR

The bike is characterized by being the only modern road sports bike to have an in-line four-cylinder engine with a 399 cm^{3} displacement, therefore an engine with a very small volume but with a multicylinder fractionation. The engine is mounted in front of the gear and is powered by a multipoint indirect electronic injection system having 4 injectors with 16-valve DOHC distribution, four for each cylinder; it delivers about 57 kW (77 HP), 42 Nm of torque and redlines at 16,000 rpm. The Ram Air system boosts power to 80 HP at high speeds.

There are three versions available: the base ZX-4R, the ZX-4R SE and the top of the range ZX-4 RR. The Special Edition is characterized by the colors and graphics inspired by the bikes of the official Kawasaki stable that races in the SBK championship and offers as standard the Quick Shifter, the Smoked windshield, the USB socket and the frame protections. The RR differs in the oversized rear shock absorber.

The chassis, partially derived from that of the smaller ZX-25R, has been redesigned and features a diamond-shaped high-strength steel trellis structure supported by a curved rear swingarm. The steering head angle is 23.5°. The weight varies depending on the trim level, from 188 kg for the base and RR to 189 kg for the SE.

At the front, the upside-down telescopic fork is a Showa SFF-BP (the ZX-4SE and ZX-4RR also have a preload adjustment mechanism), while at the rear there is a horizontal back-link suspension partially derived from the larger ZX-10R; the ZX-4RR variant has the same Showa BFRC-lite rear shock as the Ninja ZX-10R. The braking system at the front consists of twin 290 mm semi-floating discs and monobloc radial calipers, while at the rear it uses a single 220 mm disc. The 17-inch alloy wheels are fitted with 120/70 front tires and 160/60 rear tires respectively.

== See also ==
- Kawasaki Ninja Series
