= Kawasaki AR50 =

- Manufacturer: Kawasaki
- Production: 1981–1994
- Class: Moped
- Engine: 49 cc (3.0 cu in) air-cooled two-stroke single
- Transmission: 5-speed (UK) or 6-speed (other markets) manual transmission
- Suspension: Front: Telescopic fork Rear: Uni-Trak monoshock
- Brakes: Front: Single disc brake Rear: Drum brake
- Tires: Front: 2.50-18; Rear: 2.75-18
- Weight: 78 kg (172 lb) (dry)
- Related: Kawasaki AR80; Kawasaki AE50; Kawasaki AR125

The Kawasaki AR50 is a 49 cc (3.0 cu in) air-cooled two-stroke engined moped produced by Kawasaki Heavy Industries in "A" and "C" designations from 1981 until 1994 for the United Kingdom, and until 1996 or 1997 for other markets. It had five-speed transmission (overseas six-speed) and a weight of 78 kg (172 lb).

The "C" designation models were introduced in 1983 and were mechanically similar but the machine now had a sports handlebar fairing and a rear grab-handle in place of the previous sport tail. The "C" version remained in production (with only minor – mainly cosmetic – changes) for the remainder of the production run. There was a related AE model which was an off-road or "Enduro" style machine with cycle-style spoke wheels, rather than the five-spoke cast wheels of the AR models.

All models were equipped with Kawasaki's Uni-Trak rear suspension.
