= Kawasaki Ninja 600R =

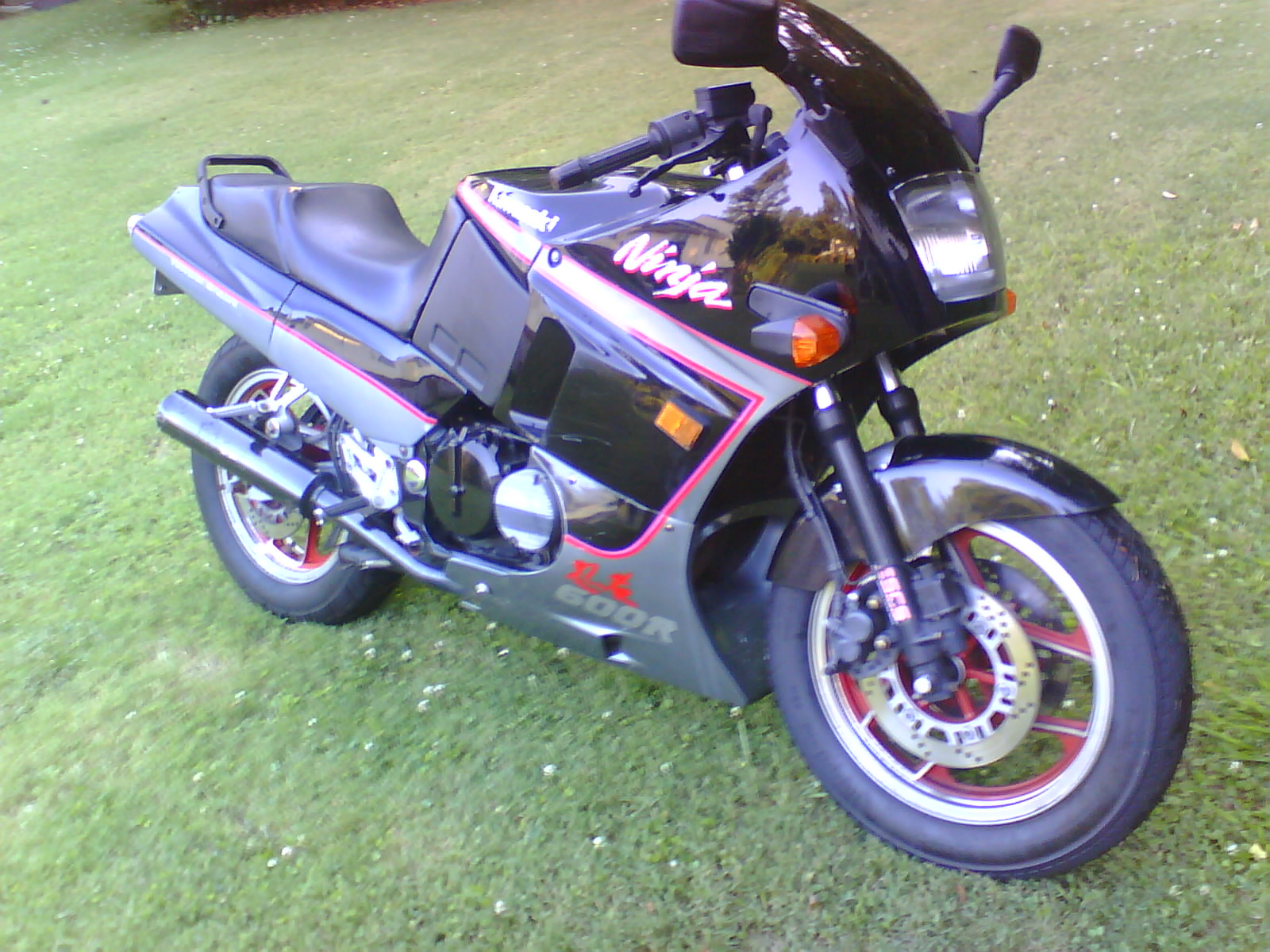
- 1992 Kawasaki GPX 600R
- Manufacturer: Kawasaki
- Also called: GPZ600R (1985-90), GPX600R (1988-97), Ninja 600RX, ZX600A-B (GPZ), ZX600C (GPX)
- Parent company: Kawasaki Heavy Industries
- Production: 1985–1990 (GPZ), 1988–1997 (GPX)
- Successor: Kawasaki ZZR600
- Class: Sport bike
- Engine: 592 cc (36.1 cu in), liquid-cooled DOHC 4V/cyl. 4-stroke, transverse 4-cylinder
- Bore / stroke: 60.0 mm × 52.5 mm (2.36 in × 2.07 in)
- Transmission: 6-speed constant mesh, wet multi-disc clutch, chain

The Kawasaki Ninja 600R (North America) or GPZ 600R ( Europe 1985–90) and GPX 600R (Europe 1988–97) is a sport bike motorcycle made by Kawasaki ZX600 line of motorcycles sold in North America. In Europe both models were different in every country with unlike colors and designations.

With minor variations over the years, in 1988, the GPX model received changes like a new double cradle frame, a different anti-dive system that Kawasaki called Electronic Suspension Control System (ESCS), meaning to improve the Automatic Variable Damping System (AVDS) suspension from the original GPZ. The GPX had more power (84 hp against 76 in the GPZ) and a higher top speed (140 mph versus GPZ's 135 mph).
