= Kawasaki GPZ1000RX =

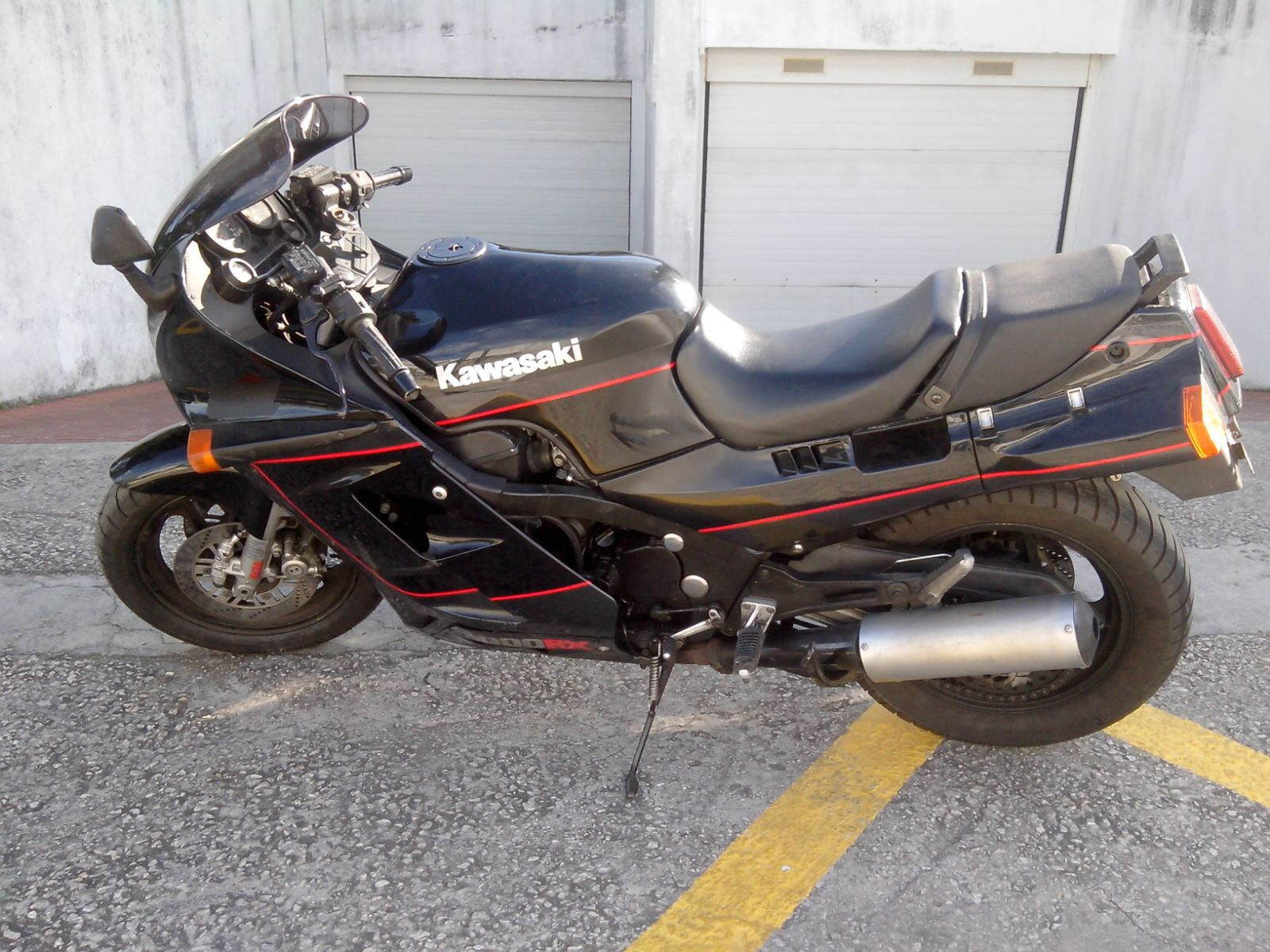
- Manufacturer: Kawasaki
- Also called: Ninja 1000R, ZXT00A
- Parent company: Kawasaki Heavy Industries
- Production: 1986–1987
- Predecessor: GPz900R
- Successor: ZX-10 "Tomcat"
- Class: Sport bike
- Engine: 997 cc (60.8 cu in), 4-stroke, transverse 4-cylinder, liquid-cooled, DOHC, 4-valve-per-cylinder
- Bore / stroke: 74 mm × 58 mm (2.9 in × 2.3 in)
- Suspension: Front: Telescopic, air Rear: Uni-Trak, air shock.
- Brakes: Front: dual disc Rear: single disc
- Tires: Tubeless; 120/80-16 (front) (A1 - A3); 150/80-16 (rear) (A1 - A3)
- Rake, trail: 29°, 114 mm (4.5 in)
- Fuel capacity: 21 L (4.6 imp gal; 5.5 US gal); Reserve: 4 L (0.88 imp gal; 1.1 US gal)
- Related: GTR1000 "Concours", ZL1000 "Eliminator"

The Kawasaki GPZ1000RX (Ninja 1000R, model designation ZXT00A) is a motorcycle manufactured by Kawasaki from 1986 to 1988. It has a 997 cc (60.8 cu in) four-cylinder, 16-valve, twin cam engine.

The GPZ1000RX was to be the replacement for the original Ninja, the GPZ900R, but as it turned out the GPZ900R not only lived on alongside the GPZ1000RX, but outlived it. Just as the GPZ900R two years before, the 1000RX was the fastest production bike at the time. Until in 1988 the GPZ 1000RX was superseded by the ZX-10 "Tomcat". Yet still the GPZ900R remained, even beyond the 1990 release of Kawasaki's new flagship, the ZZ-R1100, until 2003.

Records
Preceded by Kawasaki GPZ900R	Fastest production motorcycle 1984–1988	Succeeded by Kawasaki Tomcat ZX-10
