= Kawasaki Ninja 250SL =

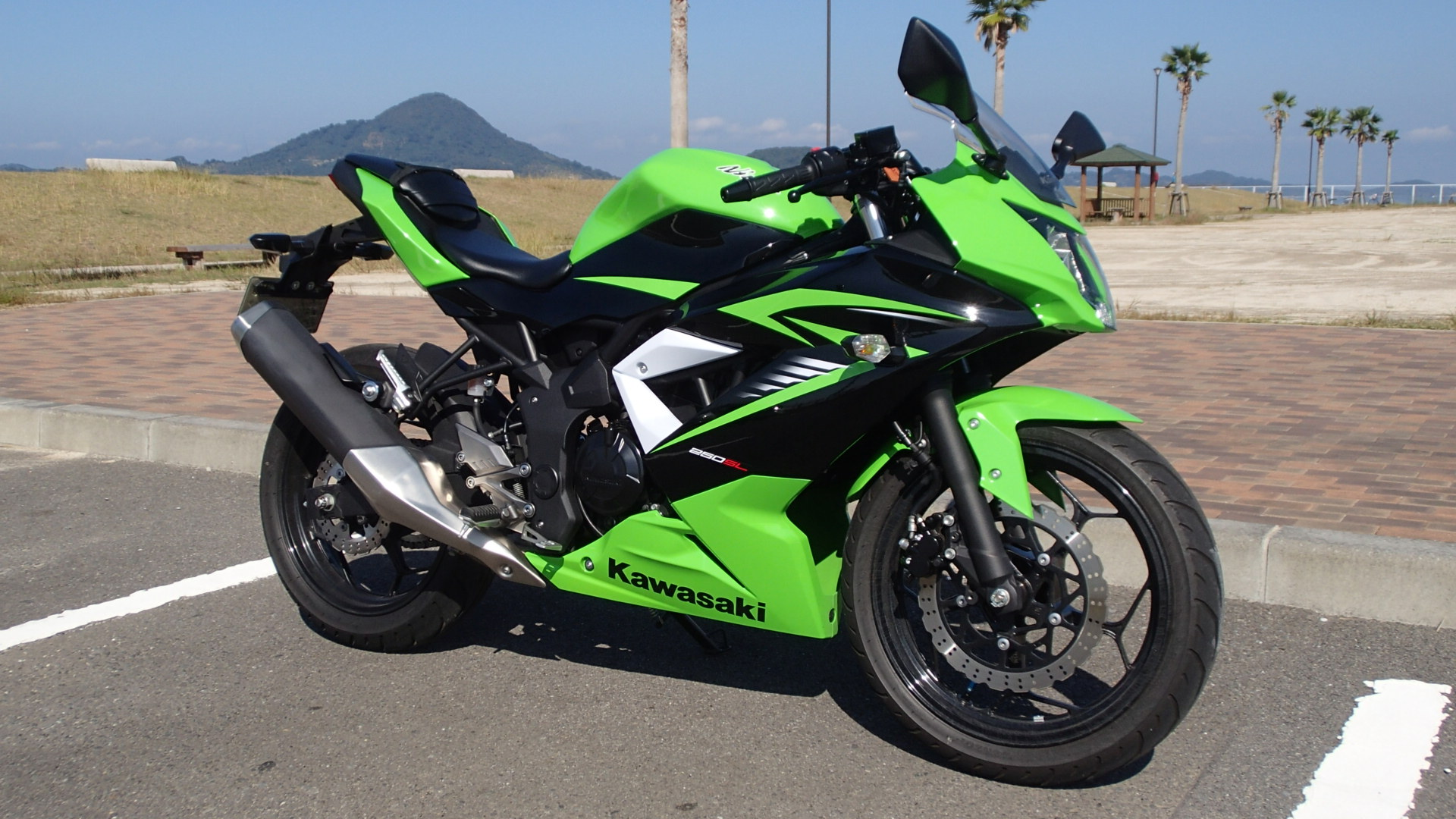
- Kawasaki Ninja 250SL (Japan)
- Manufacturer: Kawasaki Motorcycle & Engine Company
- Also called: Kawasaki Ninja RR Mono (Indonesia; until November 2016)
- Parent company: Kawasaki Heavy Industries
- Production: 2014–present
- Predecessor: Kawasaki Ninja ZX-150RR
- Class: Sport bike
- Engine: 249 cc (15.2 cu in) liquid-cooled 4-stroke 4-valve DOHC single-cylinder
- Bore / stroke: 72.0 mm × 61.2 mm (2.8 in × 2.4 in)
- Compression ratio: 11.3:1
- Power: 21.33 kW (28.6 hp; 29.0 PS) @ 9,700 rpm (claimed)
- Torque: 22.6 N⋅m (16.7 lbf⋅ft) @ 8,200 rpm (claimed)
- Transmission: 6-speed constant-mesh
- Frame type: Trellis with truss structure
- Suspension: Front: 37 mm (1.5 in) telescopic fork; Rear: Steel swingarm with monoshock (UniTrak) and 5-way adjustable spring preload
- Brakes: Front: Dual-piston caliper with single 290 mm (11.4 in) disc; Rear: Dual-piston caliper with single 220 mm (8.7 in) disc
- Tires: Front: 100/80-17M/C 52S (tubeless); Rear: 130/70-17M/C 62S (tubeless)
- Wheelbase: 1,330 mm (52.4 in)
- Dimensions: L: 1,935 mm (76.2 in); W: 685 mm (27.0 in); H: 1,075 mm (42.3 in)
- Seat height: 780 mm (30.7 in)
- Fuel capacity: 11 L (2.4 imp gal; 2.9 US gal)
- Related: Kawasaki Z250SL

The Kawasaki Ninja 250SL (codenamed BX250), formerly called Ninja 250RR Mono in Indonesia (until November 2016, later changed to 250SL), is a motorcycle in the Ninja sport bike series from the Japanese manufacturer Kawasaki sold since 2014.

The bike replaces the 2-stroke Kawasaki Ninja ZX-150RR (also called Kawasaki Ninja 150RR) that was produced from 1999 to 2016. It is powered by a 249 cc (15.2 cu in) single-cylinder engine from the KLX250 that produces a claimed 21.33 kW (28.6 hp; 29.0 PS) at 9,700 rpm and 22.6 N⋅m (16.7 lbf⋅ft) of torque at 8,200 rpm mated to a 6-speed constant-mesh transmission.

It is the first Ninja sport bike to have a four-stroke single-cylinder engine.

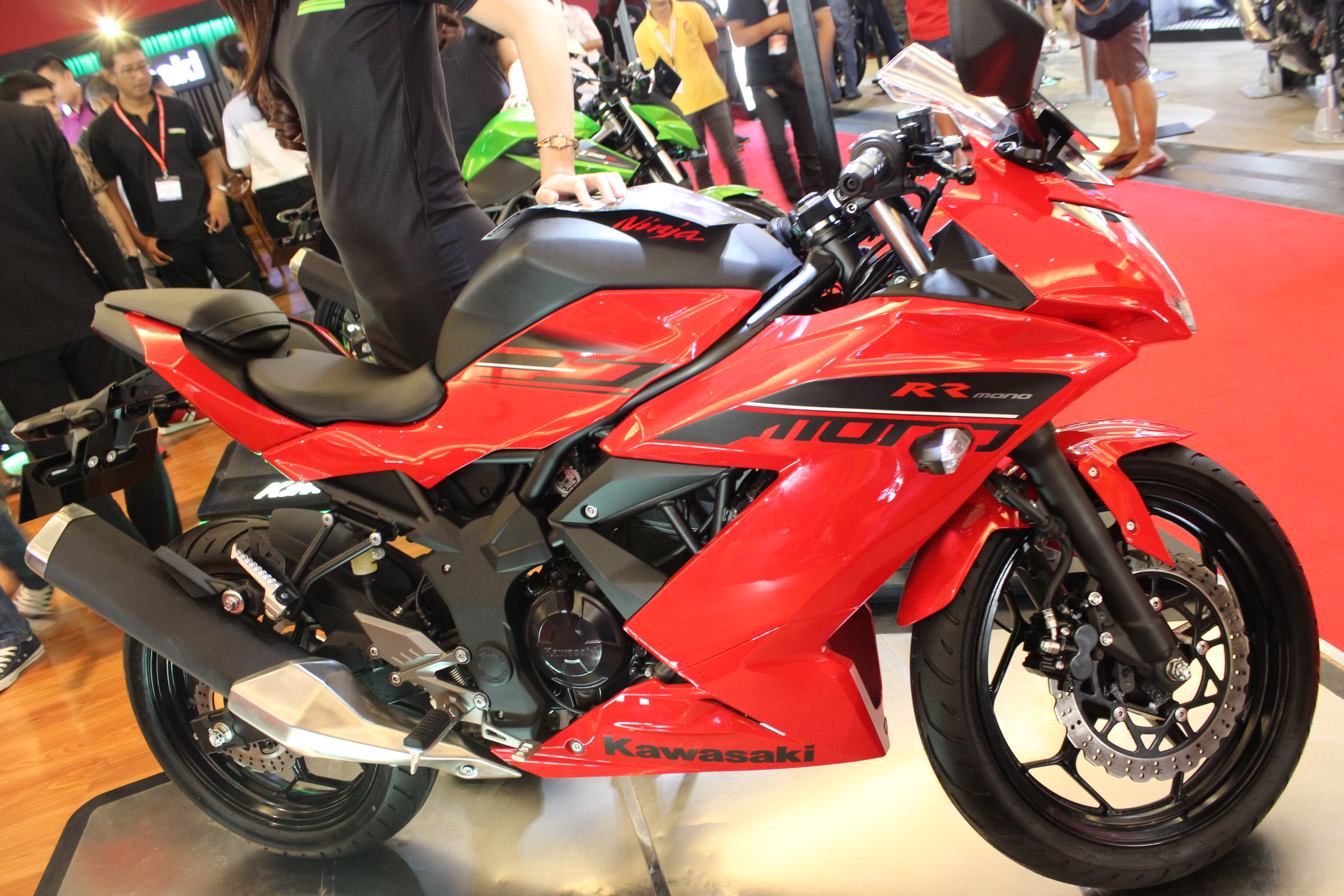
Kawasaki Ninja RR Mono Indonesia)
