= Kawasaki Tomcat ZX-10 =

Ninja ZX-10
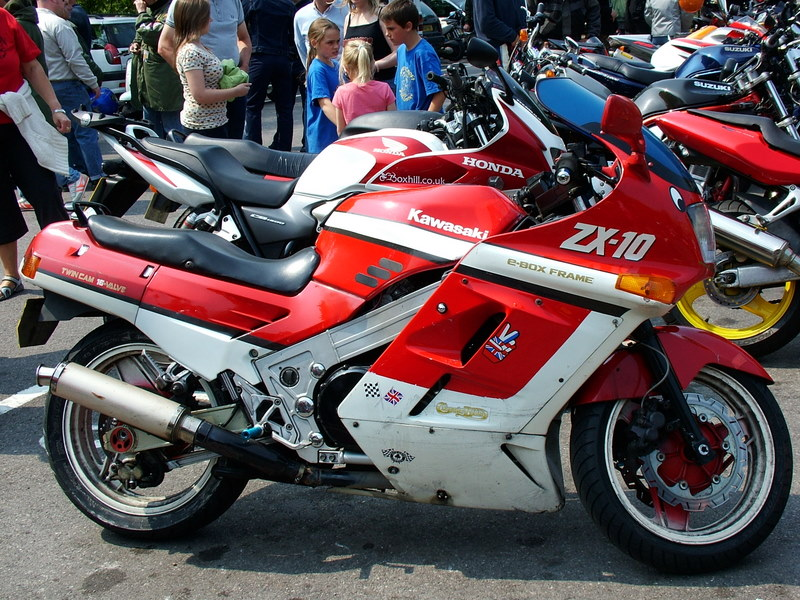
- Manufacturer: Kawasaki Heavy Industries Motorcycle & Engine
- Also called: ZX-10 Tomcat
- Parent company: Kawasaki Heavy Industries
- Production: 1988–1990
- Predecessor: GPZ1000RX
- Successor: Ninja ZX-11
- Class: Sportbike
- Engine: 997 cc (60.8 cu in) four-stroke, liquid-cooled, 16-valve DOHC, inline-four 36 mm semi-downdraft CV carburetors
- Bore / stroke: 74 mm × 58 mm (2.9 in × 2.3 in)
- Compression ratio: 11.0:1
- Top speed: 269 km/h (167 mph)
- Power: 101 kW (135 hp) @ 10,000 rpm (claimed)
- Torque: 75 lb⋅ft (102 N⋅m) @ 9,000 rpm (claimed)
- Frame type: Aluminum perimeter
- Brakes: Twin-piston radial
- Tires: Front: 17"; Rear: 18"
- Rake, trail: 26.5°, 99 mm (3.9 in)
- Wheelbase: 1,490 mm (58.7 in)
- Dimensions: H: 790 mm (31 in)
- Weight: 245 kg (541 lb) (dry)
- Fuel capacity: 21 L; 4.6 imp gal (5.5 US gal)
- Fuel consumption: 42 mpg_{‑US} (5.6 L/100 km; 50 mpg_{‑imp})

The Ninja ZX-10 (also called ZX-10 "Tomcat") was a sport motorcycle manufactured by Kawasaki Motorcycles between 1988 and 1990, part of the Kawasaki Ninja line. With a top speed of 165 miles per hour (266 km/h), it was the fastest production motorcycle in 1988.

== Design ==
The ZX-10 replaced the GPZ1000RX as the flagship sportbike from Kawasaki.

The engine was designed after its predecessor's, with the same displacement but 36 mm semi-downdraft CV carburetors and a narrower valve angle. Engine internals were altered: Compression ratio was raised to 11.0:1; lighter pistons and bigger valves were used.

It had Kawasaki's first aluminum perimeter frame, a design which has since become standard.

Aerodynamics were claimed to be better than the outgoing models.

== See also ==
- Kawasaki Ninja ZX-10R, a Ninja sportbike produced starting in 2004

Records
Preceded by Kawasaki GPZ1000RX (Ninja 1000R)	Fastest production motorcycle 1988–1989^{1}	Succeeded by Kawasaki Ninja ZX-11
Notes and references
1. Precedence per Burns, Cycle World 2012
