= Kawasaki ZX-6 and ZZR600 =

Kawasaki ZX-6/ZZR600
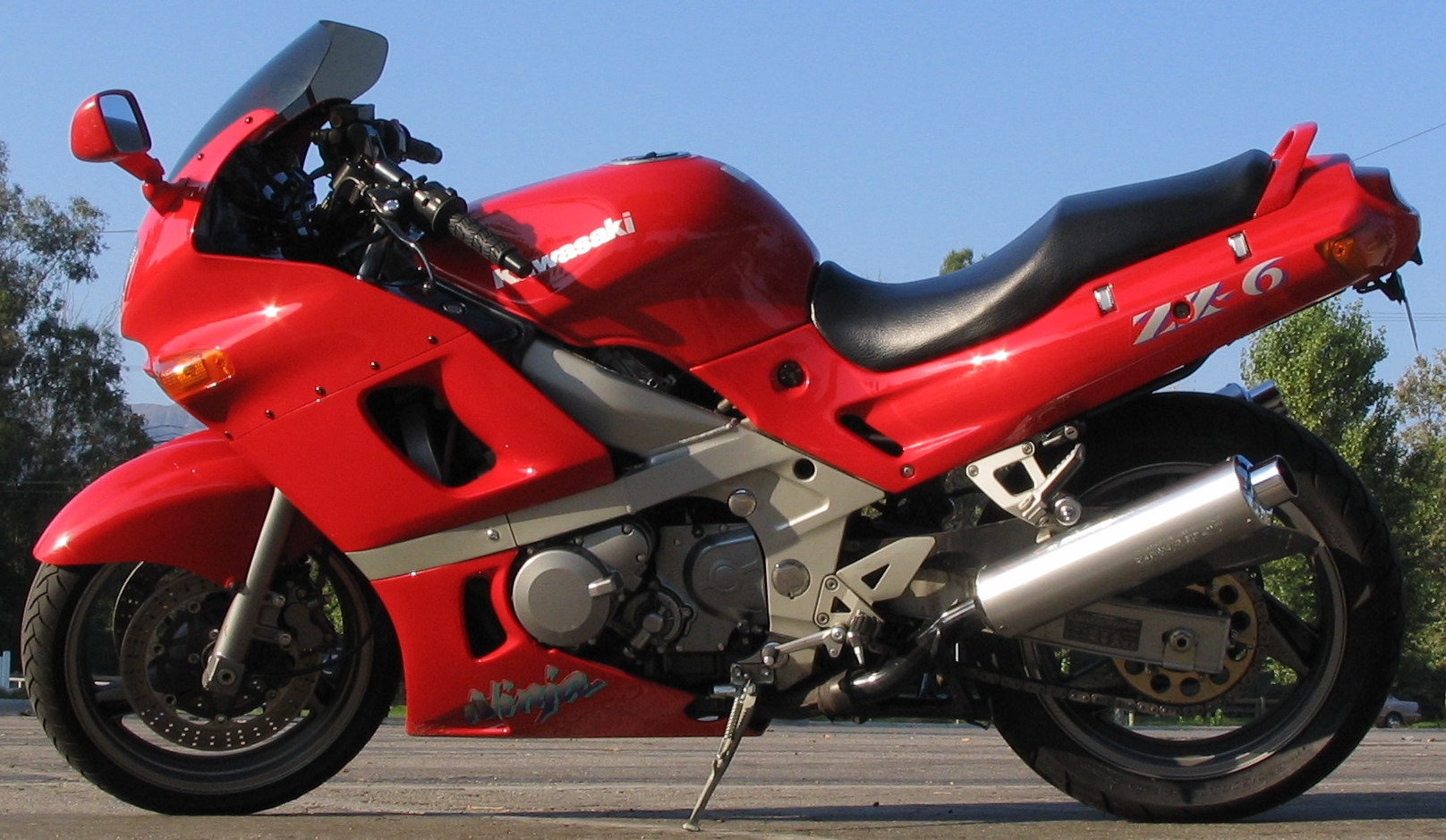
- Manufacturer: Kawasaki
- Production: 1990-2008
- Successor: Kawasaki Ninja ZX-6R
- Class: Sport bike
- Engine: 599 cc (36.6 cu in), four-stroke, liquid-cooled, 16-valve DOHC, inline-four
- Bore / stroke: 66.0 mm × 43.8 mm (2.60 in × 1.72 in)
- Top speed: 153 mph (246 km/h)
- Power: 99 hp (74 kW) (claimed); 88 hp (66 kW) (rear wheel)
- Transmission: six speed
- Rake, trail: 23.5 degrees / 3.7 in (94 mm)
- Wheelbase: 1,399 mm (55.1 in)
- Dimensions: L: 2,029 mm (79.9 in); W: 728 mm (28.7 in); H: 1,176 mm (46.3 in)
- Seat height: 780 mm (31 in)
- Fuel capacity: 18 L (4.0 imp gal; 4.8 US gal)
- Related: Kawasaki Ninja 600R

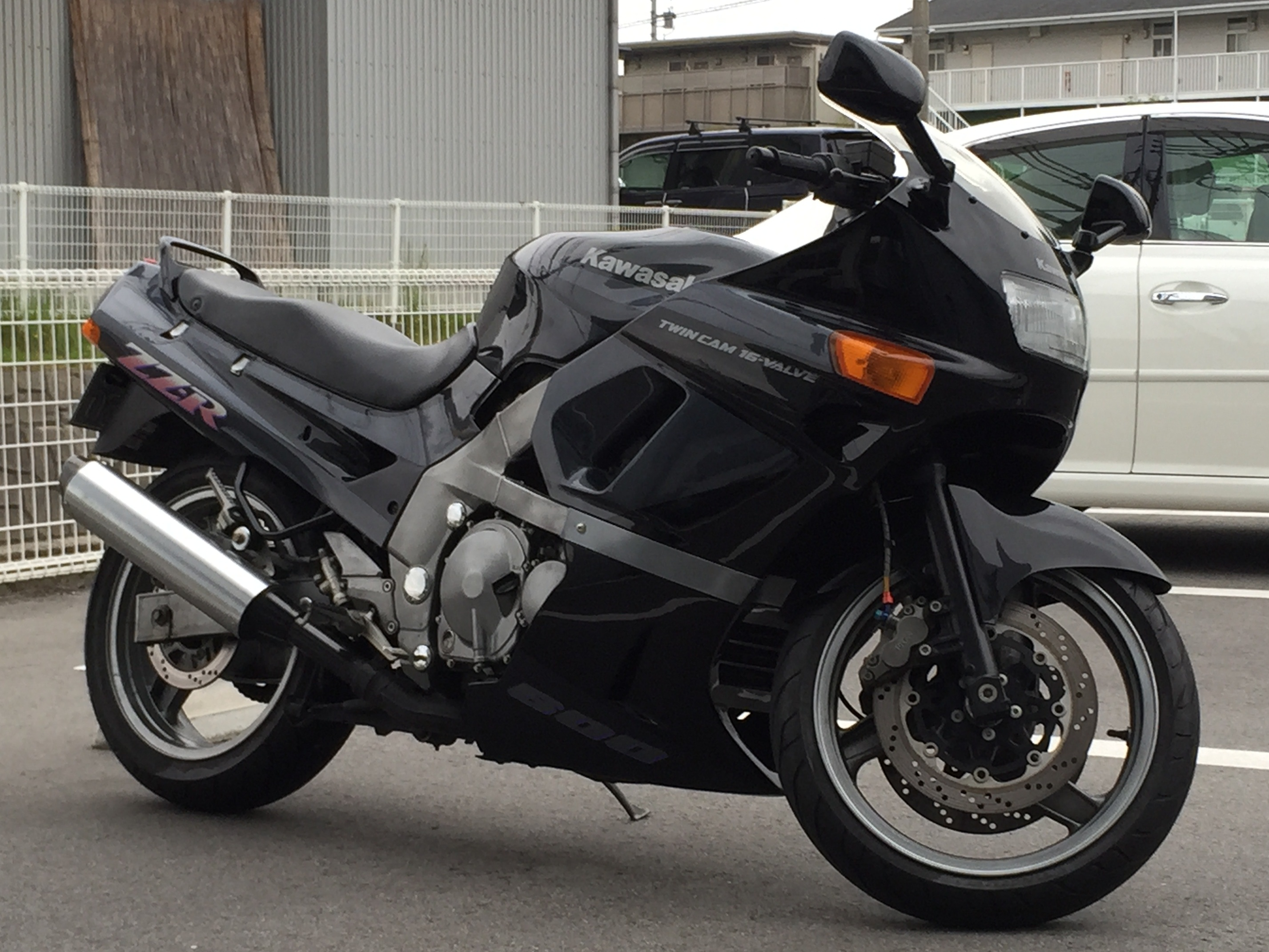
Early 90s ZX6D with squared signal lights integrated into the fairing

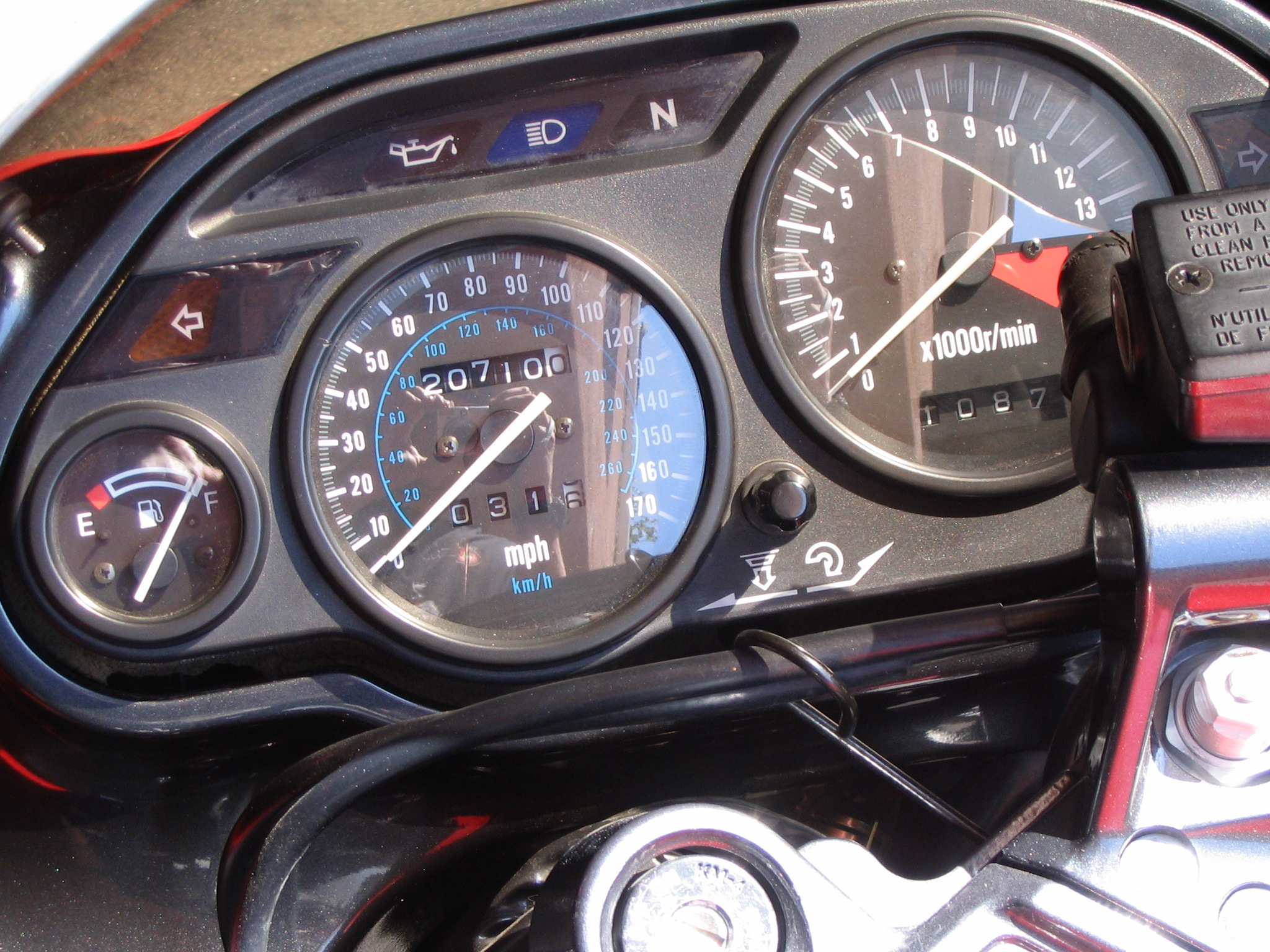
ZX6E instrument cluster with fuel gauge on the bottom left

The Kawasaki ZX-6 (ZZR600) is a 600 cc class motorcycle. The ZX-6 series motorcycle was Kawasaki's flagship 600 cc model from 1990 to 1994. It was then replaced in 1995 with the ZX-6R, the brand's 600 cc race replica.

In Europe the model designation differed, and was introduced in 1990 as the ZZR600. The same 599 cc engine powered the bike from 1990 to 2004, then from 2005 to 2008 it used the engine from the 2004 ZX-6R.

== 1990–2002 ==
The first generation ZZR600 (ZX-6 Ninja in different continents/markets) was updated in 1993 with lighter and bigger valves and intake-exhaust ducts, more permanence in the cams timing, lighter pistons, ram air. The two parts chassis (aluminium frame and steel sub-frame) changed to a one piece full aluminium chassis, and aesthetic changes.

Analogue instrumentation included standard speedometer on the left that rose in single MPH increments up to 170. Unlike the Suzuki competitor, the Katana, signal lights on the Kawasaki's cluster were amber instead of green. Owners could also rely on a fuel gauge on the left (missing on D series) and a temperature gauge on the right which many motorcycles in the same class did not have at the time. Storage was minimal, but better than most sport bikes. There was room beneath the seat for the manual and registration, but not much else. An additional compartment could be found on the left side of the fairing and the ignition key was needed to open it.

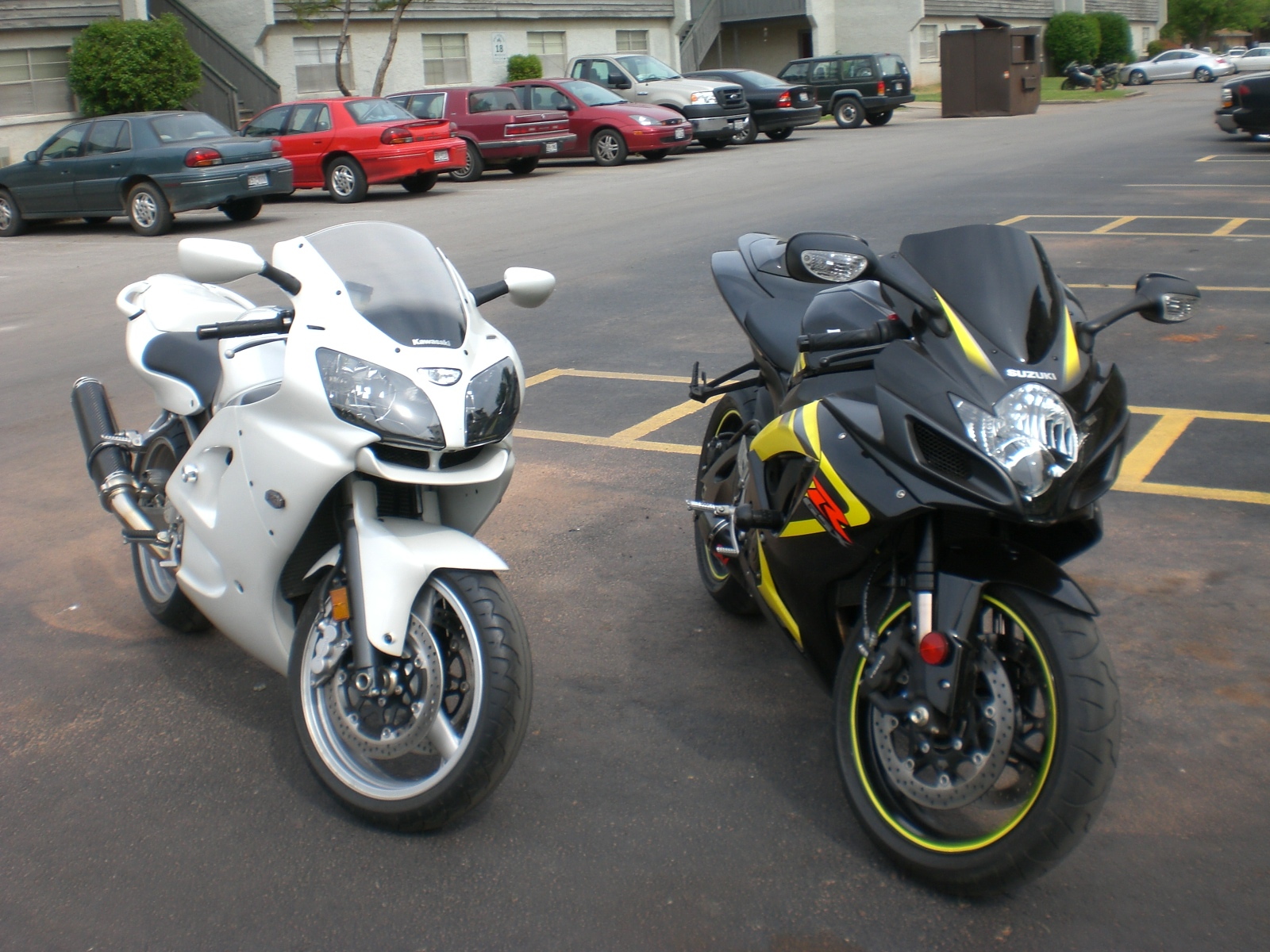
2007 ZZR600

== 2003–2004 ==
ZZR600 in North America, marketed during model years 2003 and 2004 (as well as 2005 in Canada), was based upon a previous generation sportbike (Ninja ZX-6). This indicates the motorcycle is mechanically identical to the earlier motorcycle, and differs only in paint schemes.

== 2005–2008 ==
In North America, the updated 2005 ZZR600 was a reissue of the 2001 (ZX-6R) model and remains unchanged save for a new, less invasive fairing stay. It is powered by the same 599 cc, liquid cooled, DOHC, inline four cylinder engine.

Notably, the ZZR600 uses a carbureted engine, even in its later model years, as it retains its similarity to the 2001 ZX-6R model. As such, the ZZR600's choke control sits near the left handle grip. Most modern Japanese sportbikes employ fuel injection.
