= List of fastest production motorcycles by acceleration =

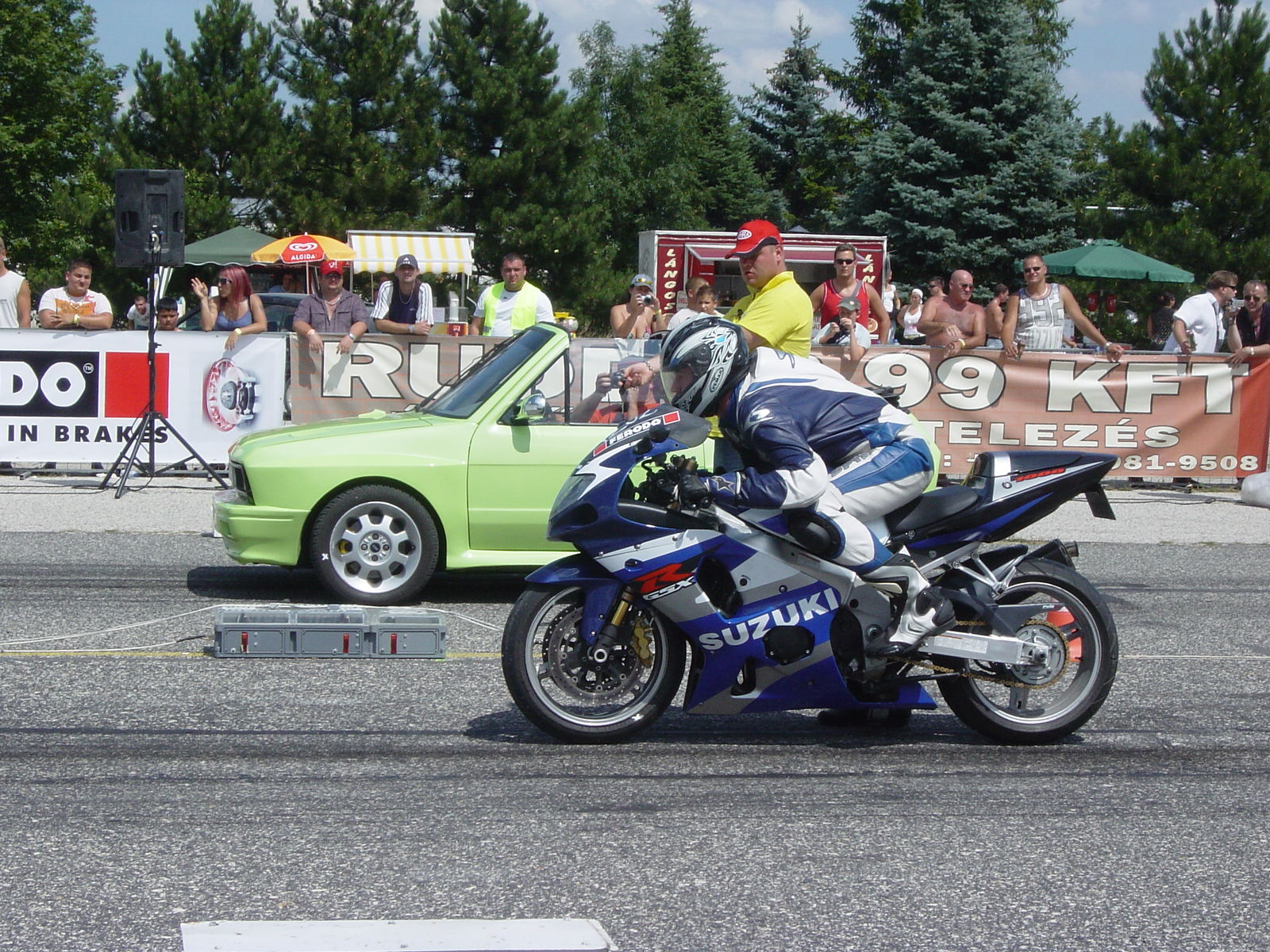
A Suzuki GSX-R1000 at a drag strip – a 2006 model once recorded a 0 to 60 mph time of 2.35 seconds

This is a list of street legal production motorcycles ranked by acceleration from a standing start, limited to 0 to 60 mph times of under 3.5 seconds, and 1/4-mile times of under 12 seconds. Concept, custom not listed, nor are racing-only motorcycles. The widely varying testing methodologies mean that, even between identical motorcycles, the acceleration times vary. Some of these differences include: rider skill and launching technique, measuring equipment, track surface conditions, weather, air temperature, and altitude.

== By 0–60 mph, 3.5 seconds or less ==
Notes specify if test was 0 to 60 mph (0 to 97 km/h) or 0 to 100 km/h (0 to 62 mph). For comparison, an object in free fall, without any air resistance, near the Earth's surface accelerates from 0–100 km/h in 2.83 seconds and from 0–60 mph in 2.73 seconds.

- Note model year 2013–2016 documented 0–60 mph times for Ducati Diavel is marked 2.5–2.8 seconds depending on source.

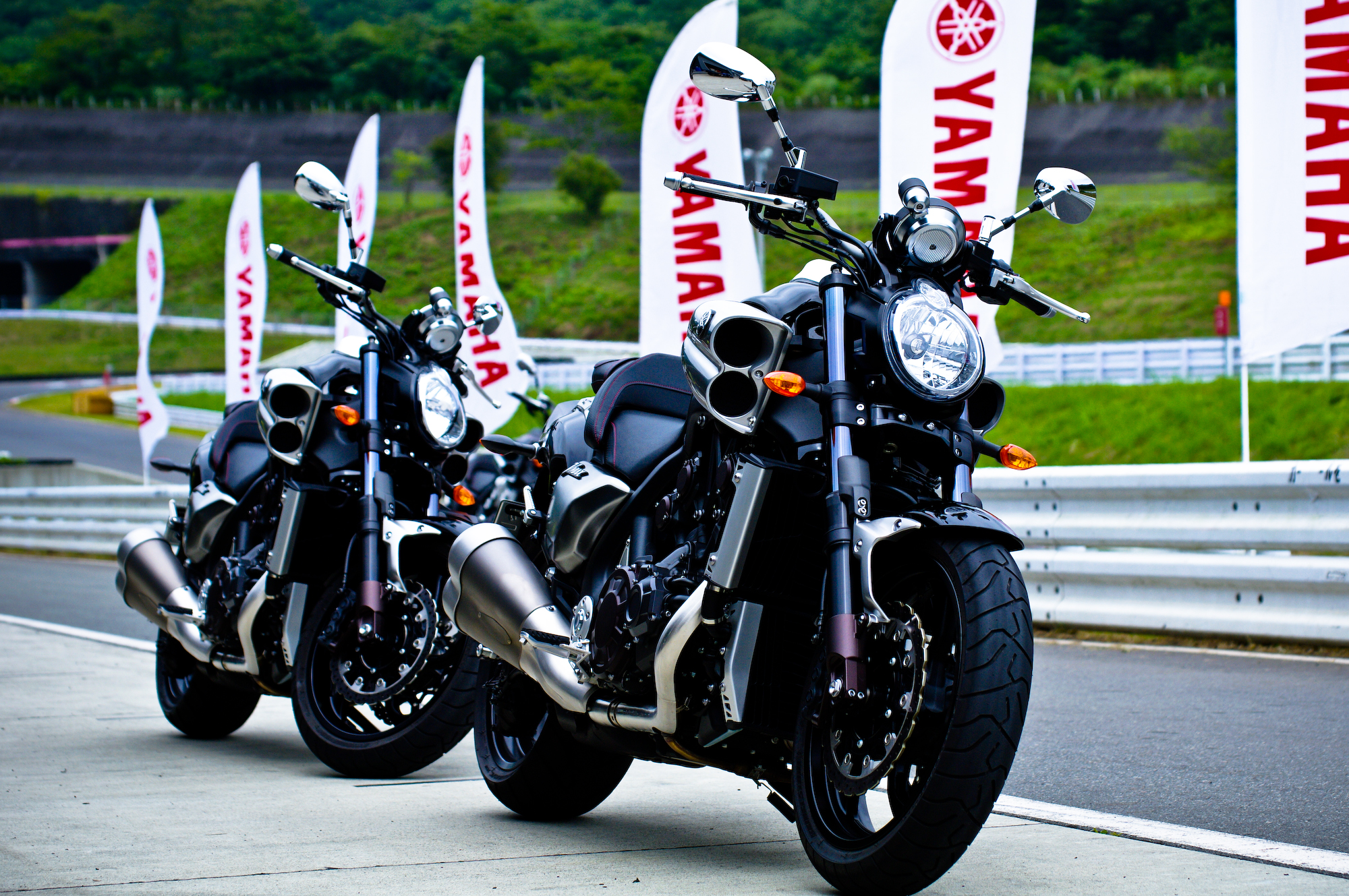
Yamaha VMAX, 2.5 seconds in 2010

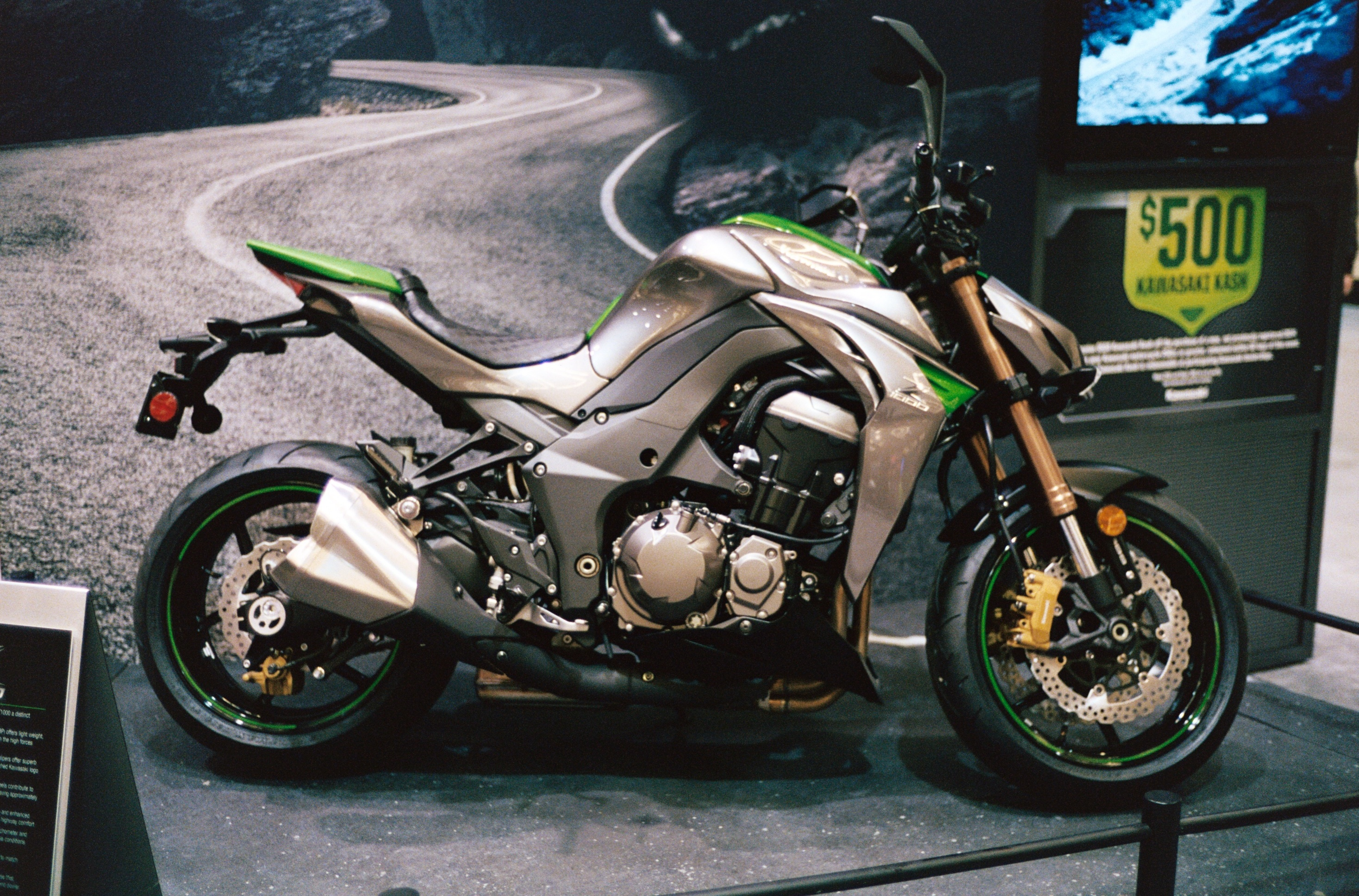
Kawasaki Z1000, 2.5 seconds in 2014

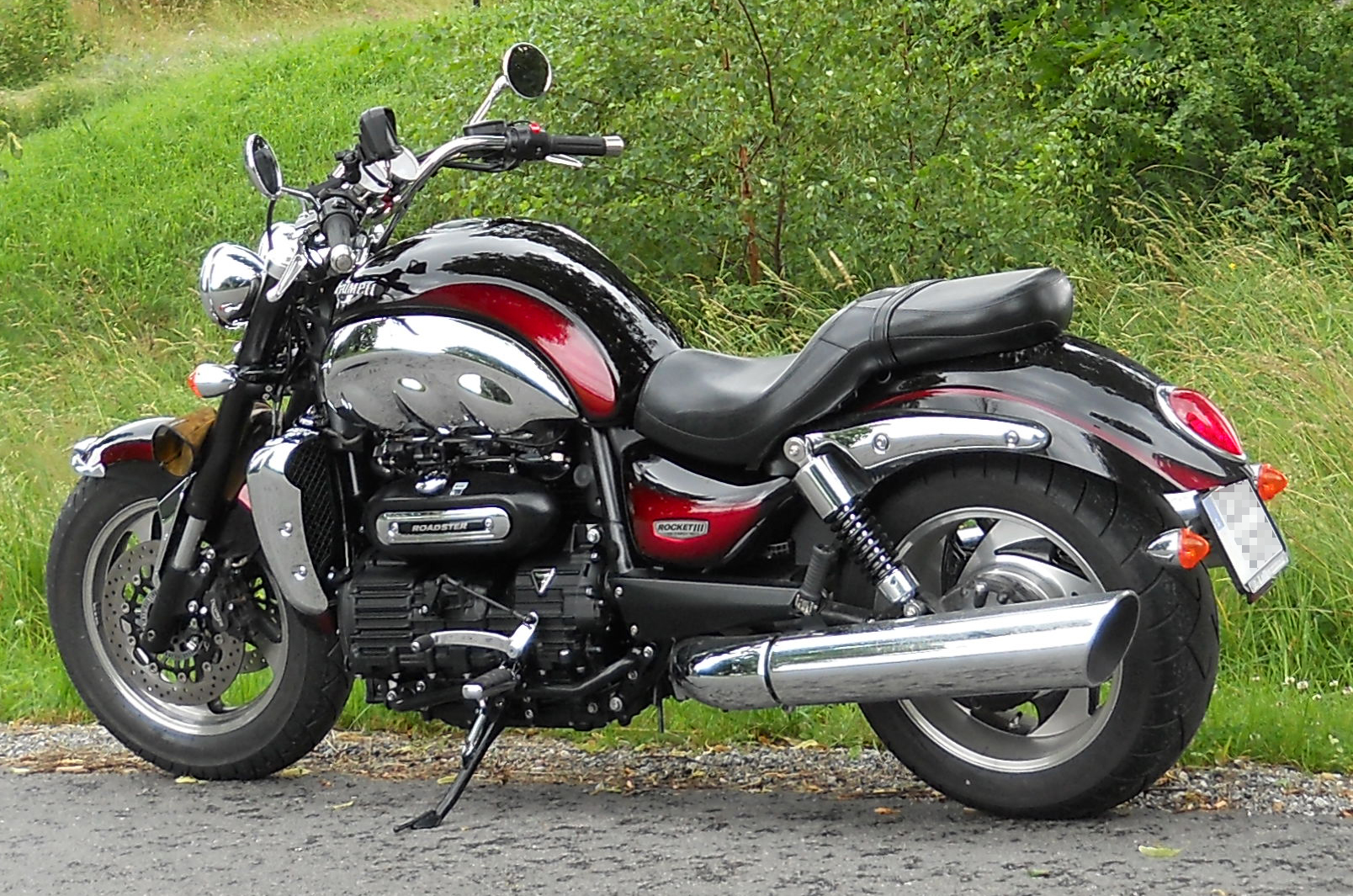
Triumph Rocket III Roadster

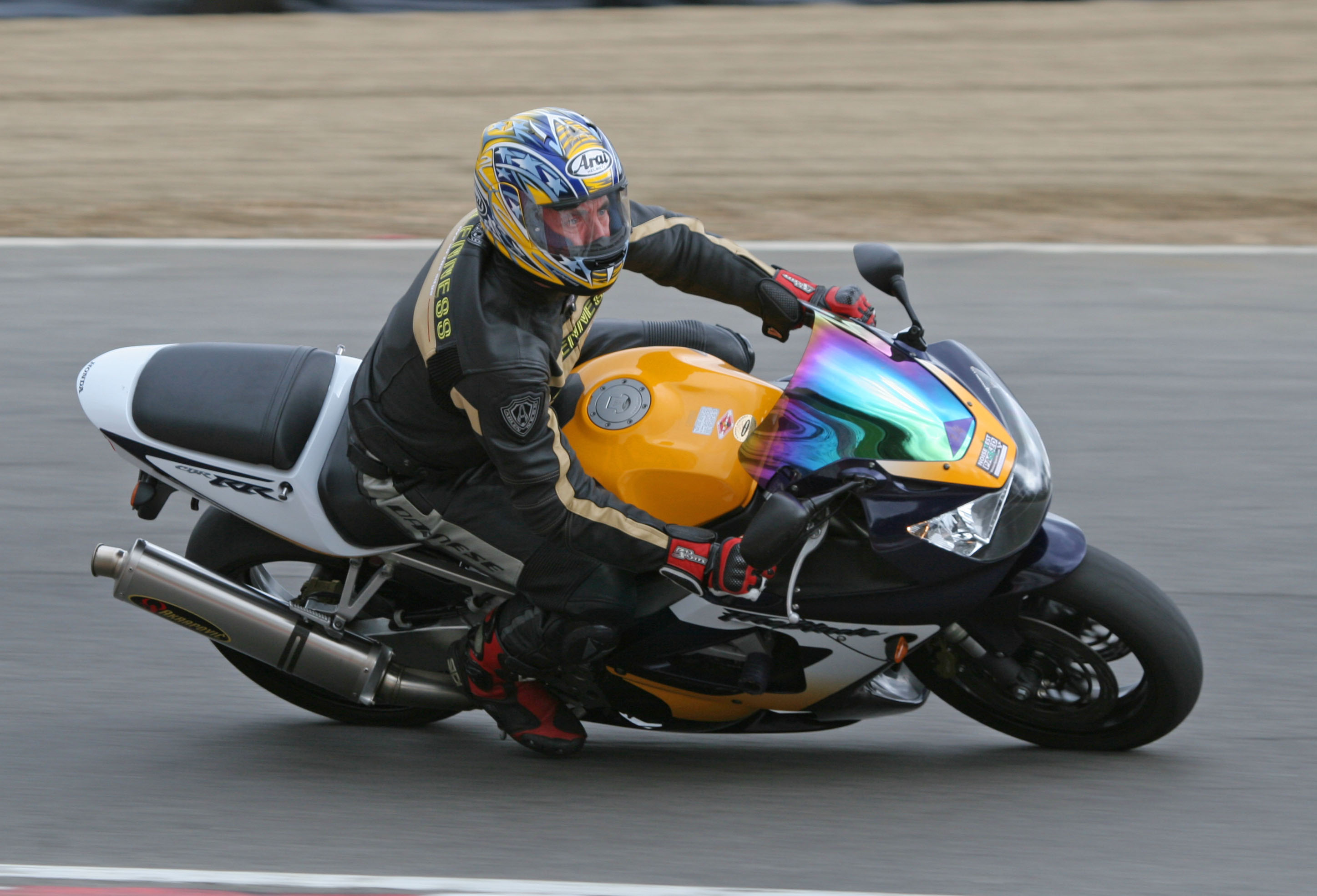
Honda CBR900RR

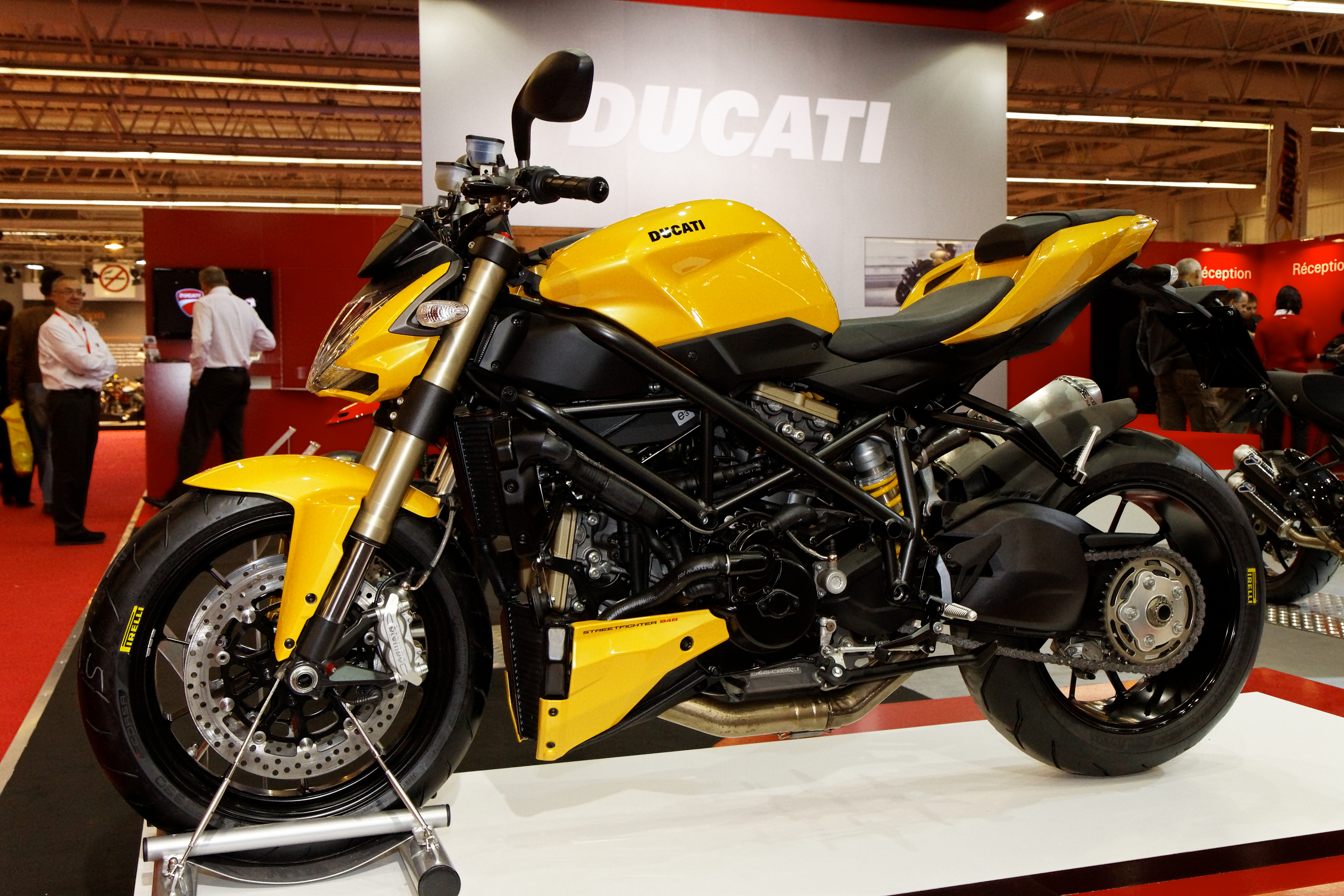
Ducati Streetfighter 848

Make and model	Year (model)	Time (seconds)^{[note]}
Suzuki GSX-R1000	2006	2.35
Suzuki Hayabusa	2002	2.47
Yamaha VMAX	2010	2.5
Kawasaki Z1000	2014	2.5
Kawasaki ZX-12R	2002	2.59
Kawasaki ZX-10R	2006	2.6
Kawasaki ZX-14R	2012	2.6
BMW S1000RR	2013	2.6
Honda CBR1000RR SP	2013	2.6
KTM 1290 Super Duke R	2014	2.6
EBR 1190RX	2014	2.6
BMW S1000R	2014	2.6
Ducati 1199 Panigale	2014	2.6
Ducati Monster 1200 S	2014	2.6
Kawasaki Ninja H2	2015	2.6
Yamaha YZF-R1	2015	2.6
Energica Ego	2020	2.6
Kawasaki ZX-12R	2000	2.7
Yamaha FZ1	2001	2.7
Suzuki GSX-R1000	2002	2.7
Ducati 1198S	2010	2.7
BMW S1000RR	2011	2.7
Yamaha MT-09 (FZ-09)	2013	2.7
Ducati 899 Panigale	2014	2.7
Triumph Rocket 3	2020	2.73
Suzuki Hayabusa	2010	2.74
BMW K1300S	2009	2.79
Honda CBR954RR	2002	2.8
Suzuki GSX-R600	2003	2.8
Yamaha YZF-R6	2003	2.8
KTM 1190 Adventure	2014	2.8
Ducati 959 Panigale	2016	2.8
BMW K1300R	2010	2.81
BMW K1200R	2006	2.85
Suzuki B-King	2008	2.86
Suzuki GSX1200W Inazuma	1998	2.88
Yamaha YZF-R1	2010	2.88
Ducati 1199 Panigale S	2013	2.89
Yamaha FZR1000	1990	2.9
Suzuki RF900	1994	2.9
Honda CBR900RR	1994	2.9
Honda CBR1100XX	2001	2.9
Honda CBR600RR	2013	2.9
Ducati 999	2003	2.9
Ducati 749S	2003	2.9
Ducati Streetfighter 848	2012	2.9
Ducati XDiavel	2019	2.9
Kawasaki ZX-6R	2003	2.9
Suzuki GSX-R750	2013	2.9
BMW R1200GS	2014	2.9
Yamaha MT-09 (FZ-09)	2015	2.9
BMW R nineT	2016	2.9
Yamaha YZF-R1	2016	2.9
Triumph Street Triple R	2017	2.9
Yamaha MT-10/FZ-10	2017	2.9
BMW K1600 GTL	2012	2.9
Yamaha YZF1000R	1996	2.96
Ducati Desmosedici RR	2008	2.96
Yamaha FJR1300	2003	2.97
Kawasaki GPZ900R	1984	3.0
Suzuki GSX-R1100	1986	3.0
Kawasaki Ninja ZX-9R	1994	3.0
Aprilia Tuono RSV-R	2003	3.0
Suzuki Bandit 1250S	2007	3.0
BMW R1200RT	2014	3.0
Yamaha XSR900	2016	3.0
Harley-Davidson LiveWire	2019	3.0
Kawasaki 1400GTR/Concours 14	2011	3.01
Kawasaki Ninja ZX-6R	2006	3.06
Suzuki SV1000s	2003	3.08
Ducati Monster 1200 S	2014	3.08
Ducati Multistrada 1200 S	2010	3.09
BMW R Nine T Racer	2018	3.10
Honda CBR600F4i	2003	3.1
Triumph Thruxton R	2016	3.1
Buell 1125R	2008	3.15
Aprilia Shiver SL750	2008	3.20
Suzuki SV650S	1999	3.20
Suzuki TL1000R	1998	3.22
Triumph Speed Triple	2006	3.25
Honda V65 Sabre	1984	3.3
Kawasaki ZZ-R600	1990	3.3
Honda CBR600	1990	3.3
Honda CBR600RR	2003	3.3
Triumph Rocket III Roadster	2010	3.3
Zero SR	2014	3.3
Yamaha MT-07	2015	3.3
Honda CBR1000F	1996	3.3
Yamaha VMAX	1997	3.33
Ducati 1299 Panigale S	2015	3.33
Honda CBR600F	1987	3.4
Kawasaki Zephyr / ZR1100	1993	3.4
Triumph Daytona 900	1994	3.4
Suzuki TL1000S	1997	3.4
Harley-Davidson VRSCR	2006	3.4
Kawasaki Ninja ZX-7R	1996	3.44
Ducati Sport1000	2000	3.44
Yamaha FZ6	2004	3.44
Suzuki GSX600F	1990	3.5
Honda CB650R	2020	3.5

== By quarter-mile time, 12 seconds or less ==
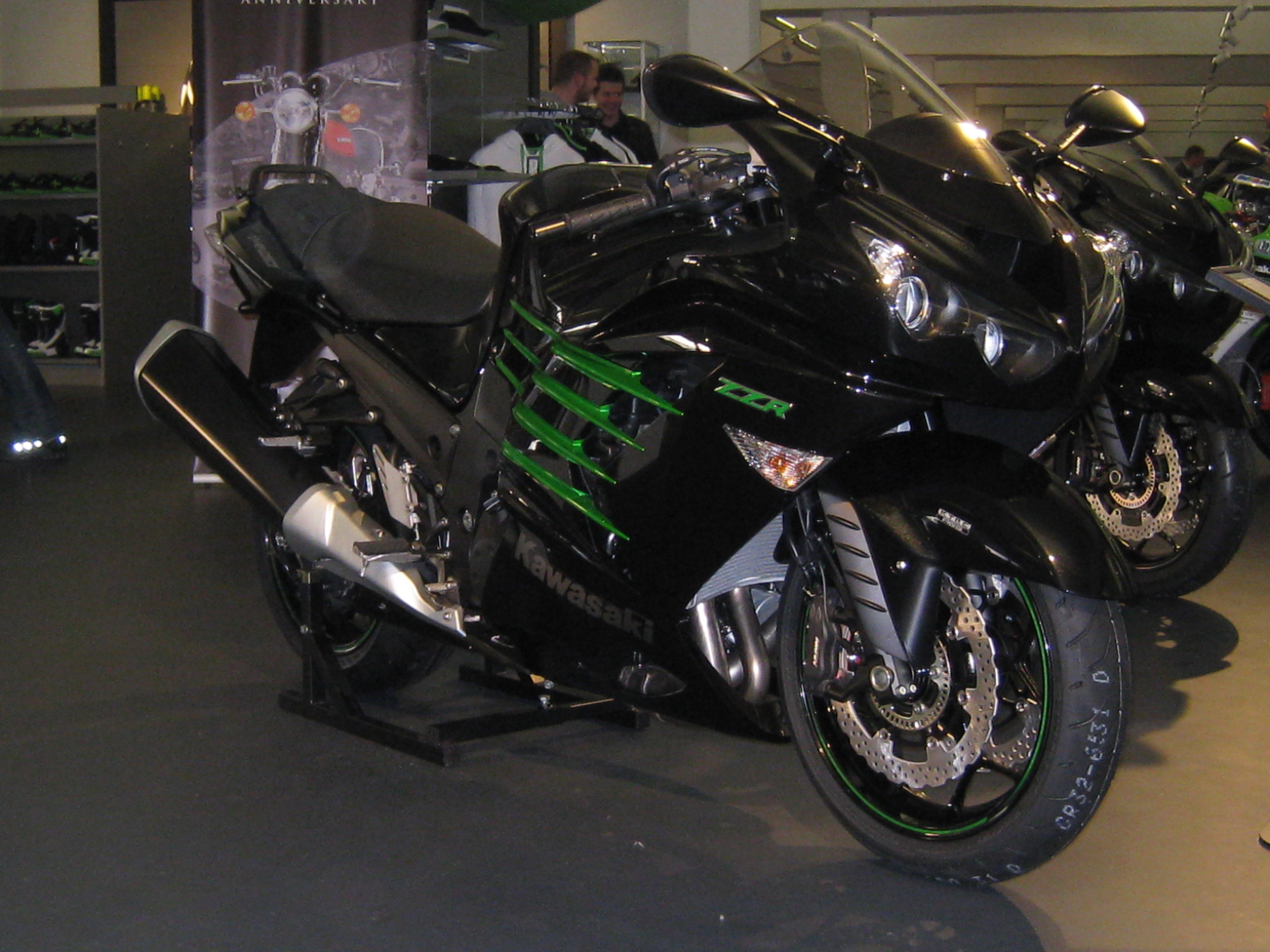
Kawasaki Ninja ZX-14R, 9.47 sec.

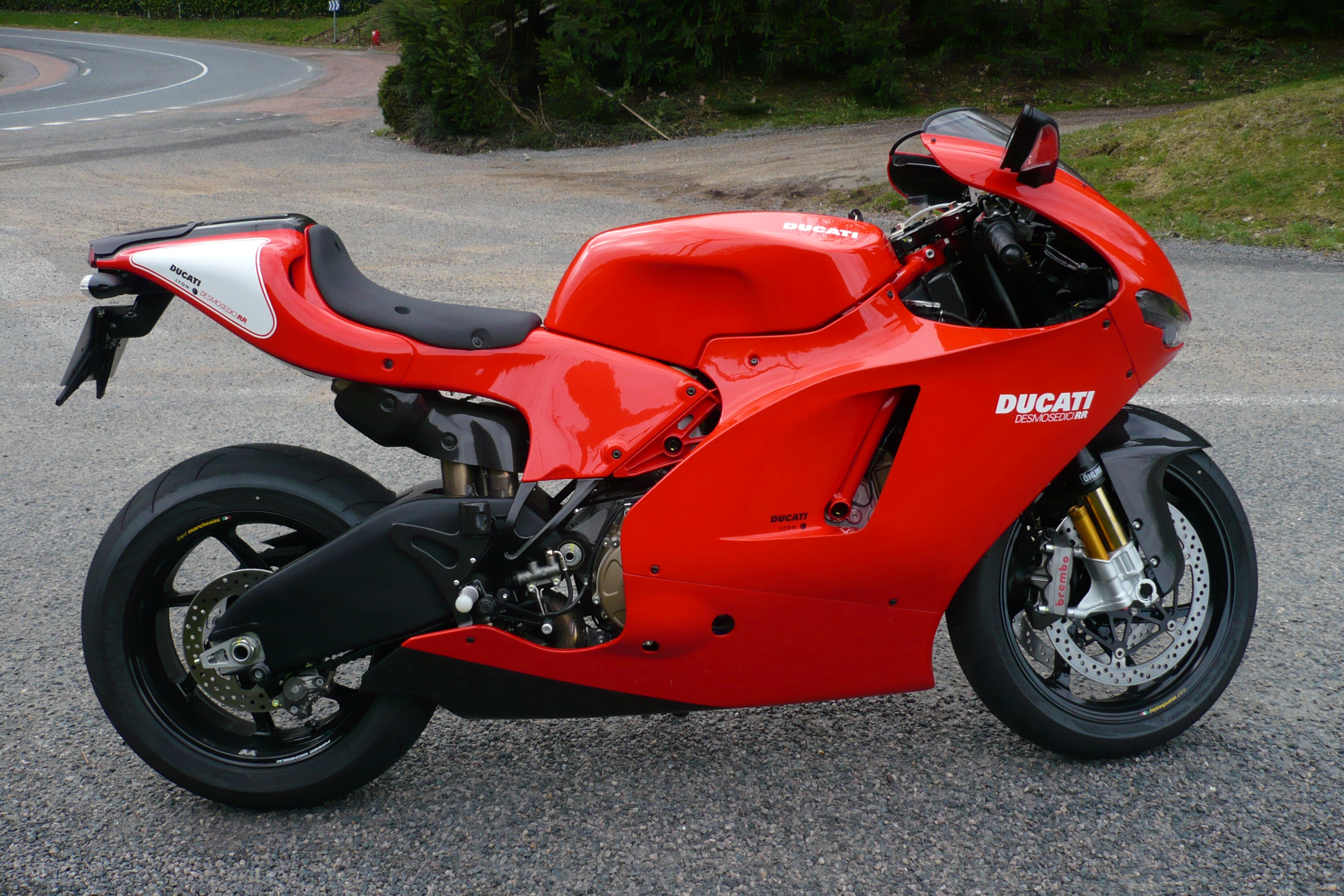
Ducati Desmosedici RR, 9.49 sec.

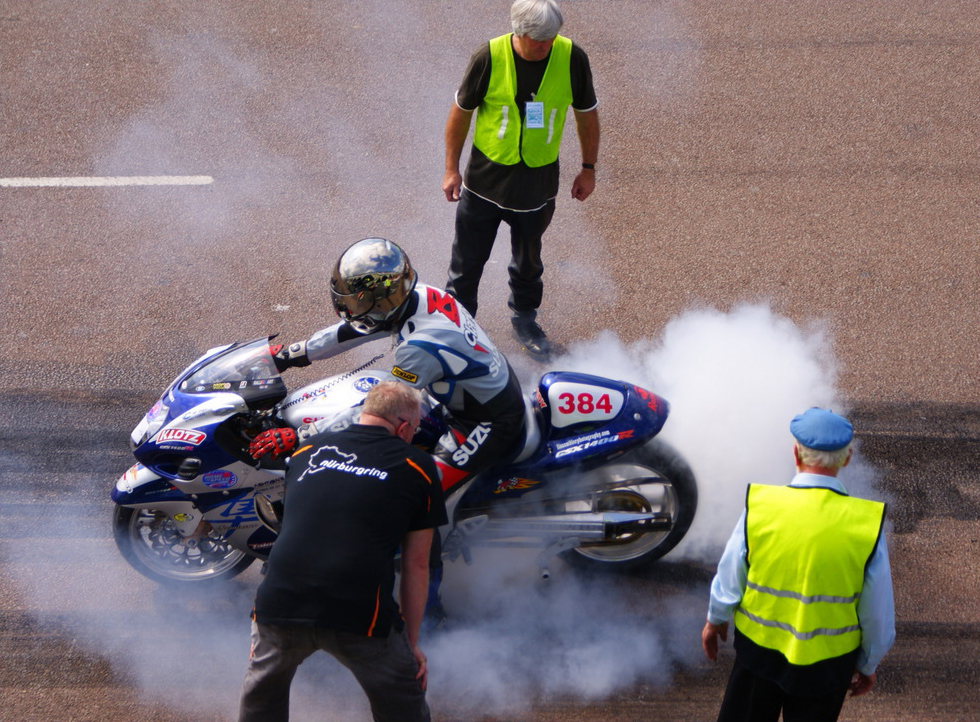
Suzuki Hayabusa, 9.7 sec.

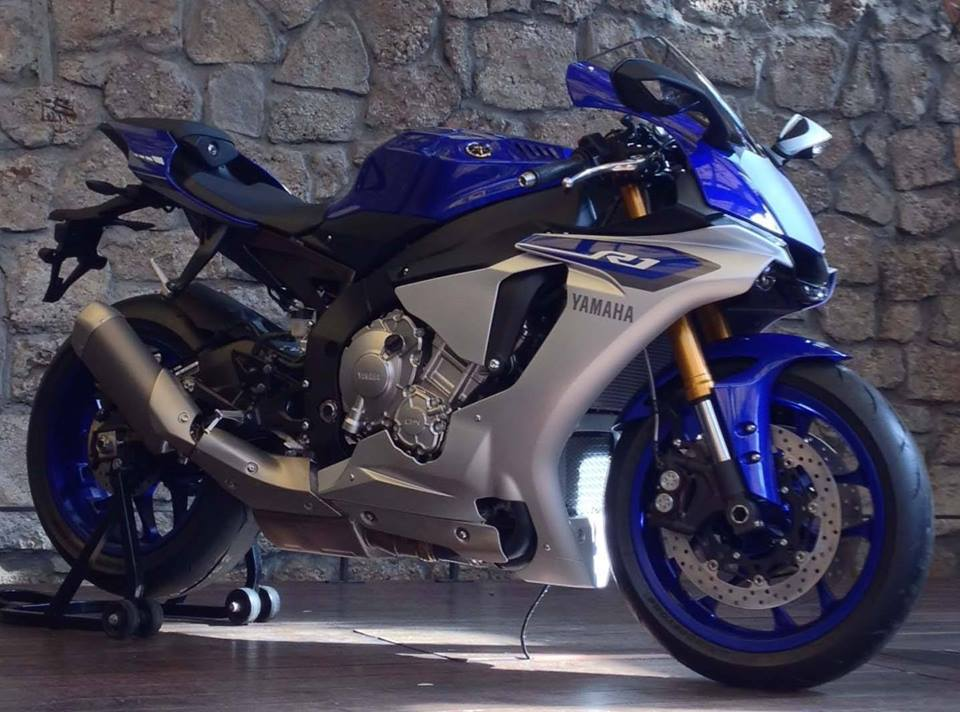
Yamaha YZF-R1, 9.83 sec.

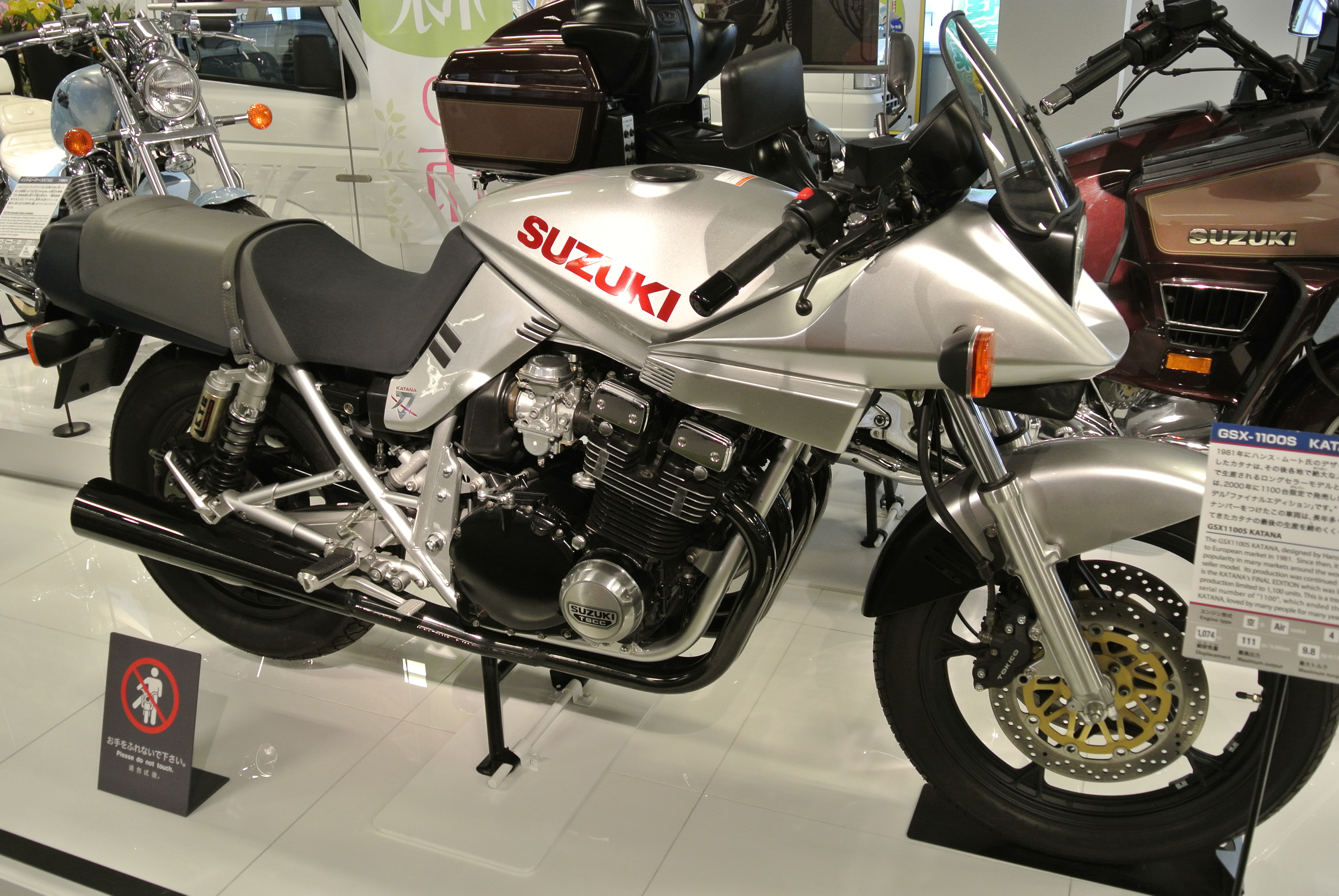
1981 Suzuki Katana, 11.32 sec.

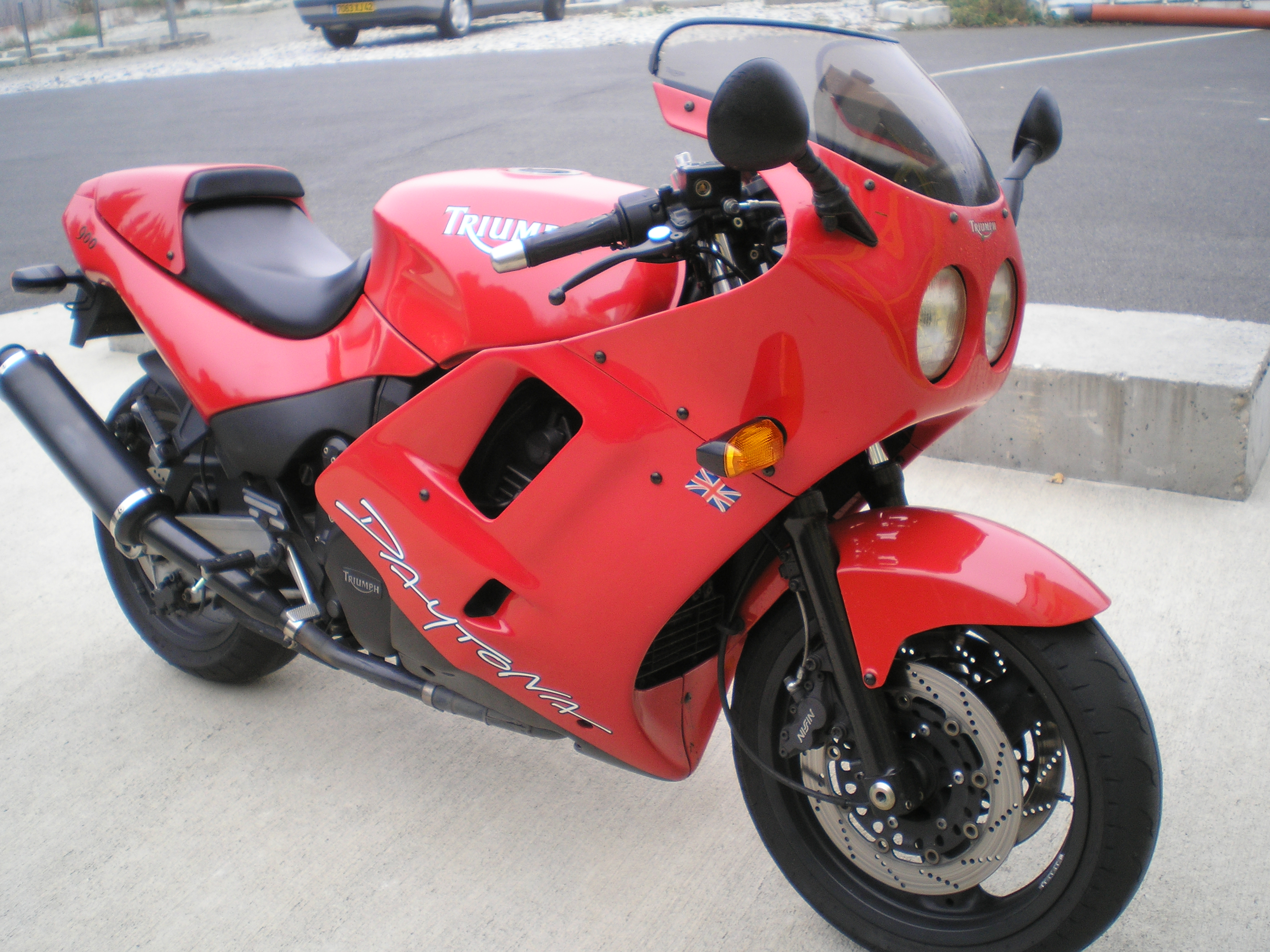
Triumph Daytona 900, 11.40 sec.

Time from standing start ending at 1/4 mi (1,320 ft).

In 1971 Cycle World said the Norton Dunstall 810 (11.9 seconds), a Norton Commando modified by a third party but available to the public as a production, not bespoke, motorcycle, was the first production motorcycle with a quarter-mile time under 12 seconds in that magazine's testing history. In 2012, the same magazine said the 1972 Kawasaki H2 Mach IV (11.95 seconds) was the first under 12 seconds.

Model year	Motorcycle	Time (seconds)	Final speed
2012	Kawasaki ZX-14R	9.47	152.83 mph (245.96 km/h)
2008	Ducati Desmosedici RR	9.49	152.80 mph (245.91 km/h)
2015	Kawasaki Ninja H2	9.62	152.01 mph (244.64 km/h)
2008	Suzuki Hayabusa	9.70	148.48 mph (238.96 km/h)
2010	Kawasaki ZX-10R	9.72	150.00 mph (241.40 km/h)
2008	Ducati 1098R	9.75	148.60 mph (239.15 km/h)
2013	BMW HP4	9.76	152.40 mph (245.26 km/h)
2006	Kawasaki ZX-10R	9.76	149.08 mph (239.92 km/h)
2015	Yamaha YZF-R1	9.83	149.91 mph (241.26 km/h)
2014	Ducati 1199 Panigale	9.84	145.68 mph (234.45 km/h)
2002	Kawasaki ZX-12R	9.87	146.29 mph (235.43 km/h)
2004	Yamaha YZF-R1S	9.90	144.98 mph (233.32 km/h)
2011	Ducati 1199 Panigale S	9.91	145.95 mph (234.88 km/h)
2011	BMW S1000RR	9.93	149.80 mph (241.08 km/h)
2014	BMW S1000R	9.94	141.74 mph (228.11 km/h)
2002	Suzuki GSXR1000	9.95	143.69 mph (231.25 km/h)
2008	Suzuki B-King	9.99	138.42 mph (222.77 km/h)
1998	Kawasaki ZX-9R	9.99	136.80 mph (220.16 km/h)
2010	Ducati 1198S	10.0	144.90 mph (233.19 km/h)
2012	Honda CBR1000RR	10.0	141.70 mph (228.04 km/h)
2012	Suzuki GSX-R1000	10.03	143.80 mph (231.42 km/h)
2010	Yamaha YZF-R1	10.05	138.51 mph (222.91 km/h)
2016	Yamaha YZF-R1	10.11	146.62 mph (235.96 km/h)
2010	Yamaha VMAX	10.11	137.00 mph (220.48 km/h)
2014	EBR 1190RX	10.12	140.29 mph (225.77 km/h)
2002	Kawasaki ZZ-R1200	10.12	136.90 mph (220.32 km/h)
2012	Kawasaki ZX-10R ABS	10.14	144.40 mph (232.39 km/h)
2010	Aprilia RSV4 Factory	10.16	142.75 mph (229.73 km/h)
2015	Ducati 1299 Panigale S	10.18	151.56 mph (243.91 km/h)
1997	Honda CBR1100XX	10.20	136.10 mph (219.03 km/h)
2009	BMW K1300S	10.22	135.04 mph (217.33 km/h)
2012	Yamaha YZF-R1	10.24	140.00 mph (225.31 km/h)
2013	KTM 1190 RC8 R	10.26	137.90 mph (221.93 km/h)
2006	BMW K1200R	10.30	132.76 mph (213.66 km/h)
2008	Ducati 1098	10.31	142.56 mph (229.43 km/h)
2014	Ducati Monster 1200 S	10.31	130.90 mph (210.66 km/h)
2002	Honda CBR954RR	10.32	138.12 mph (222.28 km/h)
2013	Kawasaki ZX-10R ABS	10.32	140.87 mph (226.71 km/h)
2017	KTM 1290 Super Duke R	10.32	137.56 mph (221.38 km/h)
2010	Honda VFR1200F	10.33	134.85 mph (217.02 km/h)
2003	Ducati 999	10.36	132.89 mph (213.87 km/h)
1997	Yamaha YZF1000R	10.38	132.72 mph (213.59 km/h)
2013	MV Agusta F4RR	10.40	140.98 mph (226.89 km/h)
2013	Suzuki GSX-R750	10.41	135.89 mph (218.69 km/h)
1997	Kawasaki ZX-11	10.42	133.02 mph (214.07 km/h)
2005	Honda RC51	10.44	133.50 mph (214.85 km/h)
2005	Honda CBR600RR	10.49	133.33 mph (214.57 km/h)
2003	Aprilia Tuono RSV-R	10.49	132.15 mph (212.67 km/h)
1994	Suzuki RF900	10.50	133.10 mph (214.20 km/h)
2010	MV Agusta Brutale 1090RR	10.50	130.98 mph (210.79 km/h)
2008	Buell 1125R	10.51	134.32 mph (216.17 km/h)
1991	Suzuki GSX-R1100M	10.55	133.70 mph (215.17 km/h)
2014	Triumph Speed Triple R	10.55	129.32 mph (208.12 km/h)
2011	Kawasaki 1400GTR/Concours 14	10.56	127.68 mph (205.48 km/h)
2006	Suzuki GSX-R1000	10.58	144.25 mph (232.15 km/h)
2003	Suzuki SV1000s	10.59	130.81 mph (210.52 km/h)
1994	Honda CBR900RR	10.60	131.10 mph (210.98 km/h)
2001	Yamaha FZ1	10.62	130.02 mph (209.25 km/h)
2010	Ducati Multistrada 1200 S	10.62	127.62 mph (205.38 km/h)
2011	Ducati Diavel	10.63	128 mph (206 km/h)
2013	Yamaha MT-09 (FZ-09)	10.66	125.24 mph (201.55 km/h)
2003	Honda CBR600RR	10.68	130.07 mph (209.33 km/h)
1994	Kawasaki Ninja ZX-9R	10.70	129.70 mph (208.73 km/h)
2003	Kawasaki ZX-6R	10.73	127.95 mph (205.92 km/h)
1997	Ducati 916	10.77	126.30 mph (203.26 km/h)
1991	Kawasaki ZZR-1100	10.78	132 mph (212 km/h)
2006	Kawasaki Ninja ZX-6R	10.78	127.12 mph (204.58 km/h)
1998	Suzuki TL1000R	10.79	129.54 mph (208.47 km/h)
2003	Suzuki GSX-R600	10.79	127.89 mph (205.82 km/h)
2006	Triumph Speed Triple	10.82	125.01 mph (201.18 km/h)
2003	Yamaha YZF-R6	10.84	127.81 mph (205.69 km/h)
2002	MV Agusta F4 Senna	10.85	131.85 mph (212.19 km/h)
1997	Suzuki TL1000S	10.85	127.70 mph (205.51 km/h)
1991	Yamaha FZR1000RU	10.87	130 mph (210 km/h)
2001	Ducati Monster S4	10.89	119.42 mph (192.19 km/h)
2012	Ducati Streetfighter 848	10.94	125.58 mph (202.10 km/h)
1984	Suzuki GS1150ES	10.94	125 mph (201 km/h)
2017	Kawasaki Z900	10.95	125.06 mph (201.25 km/h)
1986	Honda VFR750F	10.95	113.95 mph (183.38 km/h)
2006	Triumph Daytona 675	10.96	127.32 mph (204.90 km/h)
2015	Yamaha MT-09 (FZ-09)	10.97	122.58 mph (197.27 km/h)
2013	Yamaha FJR1300A	10.98	122.29 mph (196.81 km/h)
1986	Suzuki GSX-R1100	11.04	123.13 mph (198.16 km/h)
2001	Aprilia RST1000 Futura	11.04	121.12 mph (194.92 km/h)
2020	Triumph Street Triple RS	11.05	128.80 mph (207.28 km/h)
1983	Honda V65 Magna	11.07	123.62 mph (198.95 km/h)
2016	Yamaha XSR900	11.07	122.33 mph (196.97 km/h)
1997	Yamaha VMAX	11.09	121.49 mph (195.52 km/h)
2003	Honda CBR600F4i	11.11	123.74 mph (199.14 km/h)
1983	Honda CB1100F	11.13	120.48 mph (193.89 km/h)
2003	Ducati 749S	11.15	123.04 mph (198.01 km/h)
1996	Kawasaki Ninja ZX-7R	11.17	122.27 mph (196.77 km/h)
2008	Triumph Street Triple	11.17	120.06 mph (193.22 km/h)
1984	Kawasaki GPZ900R	11.18	121.65 mph (195.78 km/h)
1981	Kawasaki GPZ1100	11.18	119.10 mph (191.67 km/h)
1993	Honda CBR1000F	11.19	121.24 mph (195.12 km/h)
2012	BMW K1600 GTL	11.2	118.7 mph (191 km/h)
2014	BMW R1200RT	11.22	119.24 mph (191.90 km/h)
2016	BMW R nineT	11.30	118.02 mph (189.93 km/h)
1981	Suzuki Katana	11.32	120.00 mph (193.12 km/h)
2012	Triumph Tiger Explorer 1200	11.32	118.07 mph (190.02 km/h)
2004	Yamaha FZ6	11.32	118.01 mph (189.92 km/h)
1979	Honda CBX	11.36	118.11 mph (190.08 km/h)
2001	Harley-Davidson VRSC V-Rod	11.38	119.07 mph (191.62 km/h)
1980	Suzuki GS1100E	11.39	118.42 mph (190.58 km/h)
2011	BMW F800R	11.39	116.83 mph (188.02 km/h)
1994	Triumph Daytona 900	11.40	119.10 mph (191.67 km/h)
1984	Kawasaki GPZ750 Turbo	11.40	118.42 mph (190.58 km/h)
2004	Triumph Rocket III	11.44	118.33 mph (190.43 km/h)
1998	Ducati 748	11.46	119.3 mph (192.0 km/h)
2010	Triumph Rocket III Roadster	11.48	115 mph (185 km/h)
2008	Moto Guzzi Griso 1200 8V	11.51	116.00 mph (186.68 km/h)
1990	Kawasaki ZZ-R600	11.55	119.00 mph (191.51 km/h)
2003	Ducati Multistrada	11.60	113.77 mph (183.10 km/h)
2006	Suzuki Boulevard M109R	11.62	114.91 mph (184.93 km/h)
2003	Suzuki SV650s	11.63	114.41 mph (184.13 km/h)
2009	Ducati Sport1000	11.64	136.50 mph (219.68 km/h)
2002	Triumph Speed Four	11.65	114.90 mph (184.91 km/h)
1985	Yamaha XJ750X Maxim-X	11.66	116.10 mph (186.84 km/h)
1991	Triumph Trophy 1200 (120ps)	11.70	120 mph (190 km/h)
1983	Honda CX650 Turbo	11.75	112.21 mph (180.58 km/h)
1999	BMW R1100S	11.78	114.73 mph (184.64 km/h)
1978	Yamaha XS1100	11.78	114.21 mph (183.80 km/h)
1978	Suzuki GS1000	11.83	107.88 mph (173.62 km/h)
2005	Ducati Multistrada 1000DS	11.88	113.10 mph (182.02 km/h)
2011	Yamaha XT1200Z Super Ténéré	11.89	109.57 mph (176.34 km/h)
1971	Norton Dunstall 810^{[note]}	11.9	107.88 mph (173.62 km/h)
2007	Victory 8-Ball	11.91	113.26 mph (182.27 km/h)
1979	Kawasaki KZ1300	11.93	114.79 mph (184.74 km/h)
1980	Honda CBX	11.93	114.06 mph (183.56 km/h)
2015	Indian Scout	11.93	110.05 mph (177.11 km/h)
1982	Kawasaki GPZ750	11.93	109.62 mph (176.42 km/h)
1987	Honda CBR600F	11.94	111.42 mph (179.31 km/h)
1972	Kawasaki H2 Mach IV^{[note]}	11.95	115.38 mph (185.69 km/h)
1993	Kawasaki Zephyr / ZR1100	11.95	114.50 mph (184.27 km/h)
1993	Triumph Trophy 1200 (110ps)	12.00	117 mph (188 km/h)

== Notes ==
- European manufacturers quote 0–100 km/h (62 mph), whereas U.S. manufacturers quote 0–60 mph (97 km/h). This leads to discrepancies in comparisons.
- The 1971 Norton Dunstall was the first "production motorcycle" to achieve a quarter-mile time under 12 seconds in Cycle World's testing, according to that magazine at that time. Later, in 2012, Cycle World said the 1972 Kawasaki H2 Mach IV was the first such production bike. The Norton Dunstall began as a factory-produced Norton motorcycle and was modified at the shops of Paul Dunstall and built in very limited numbers to satisfy Homologation rules for road racing while the Kawasaki Mach IV was a production motorcycle built in a manufacturing plant and produced in large numbers.
