= Fastest motorcycle =

The fastest motorcycle may refer to:

- the fastest production motorcycles
- the fastest production motorcycles by acceleration
