= K40 =

K40 or K-40 may refer to:

- BMW K 1300 S (K40), a sports motorcycle from BMW Motorrad
- HMS Peony (K40), a corvette of the UK Royal Navy
- INS Eilat (K-40), a destroyer of the Israeli Navy
- INS Veer (K40), a corvette of the Indian Navy
- Piano Concerto No. 3 (Mozart), by Wolfgang Amadeus Mozart
- Potassium-40, a radioactive isotope of potassium
- Redmi K40, a smartphone
- Toyota K40 transmission
