= Ducati Diavel =

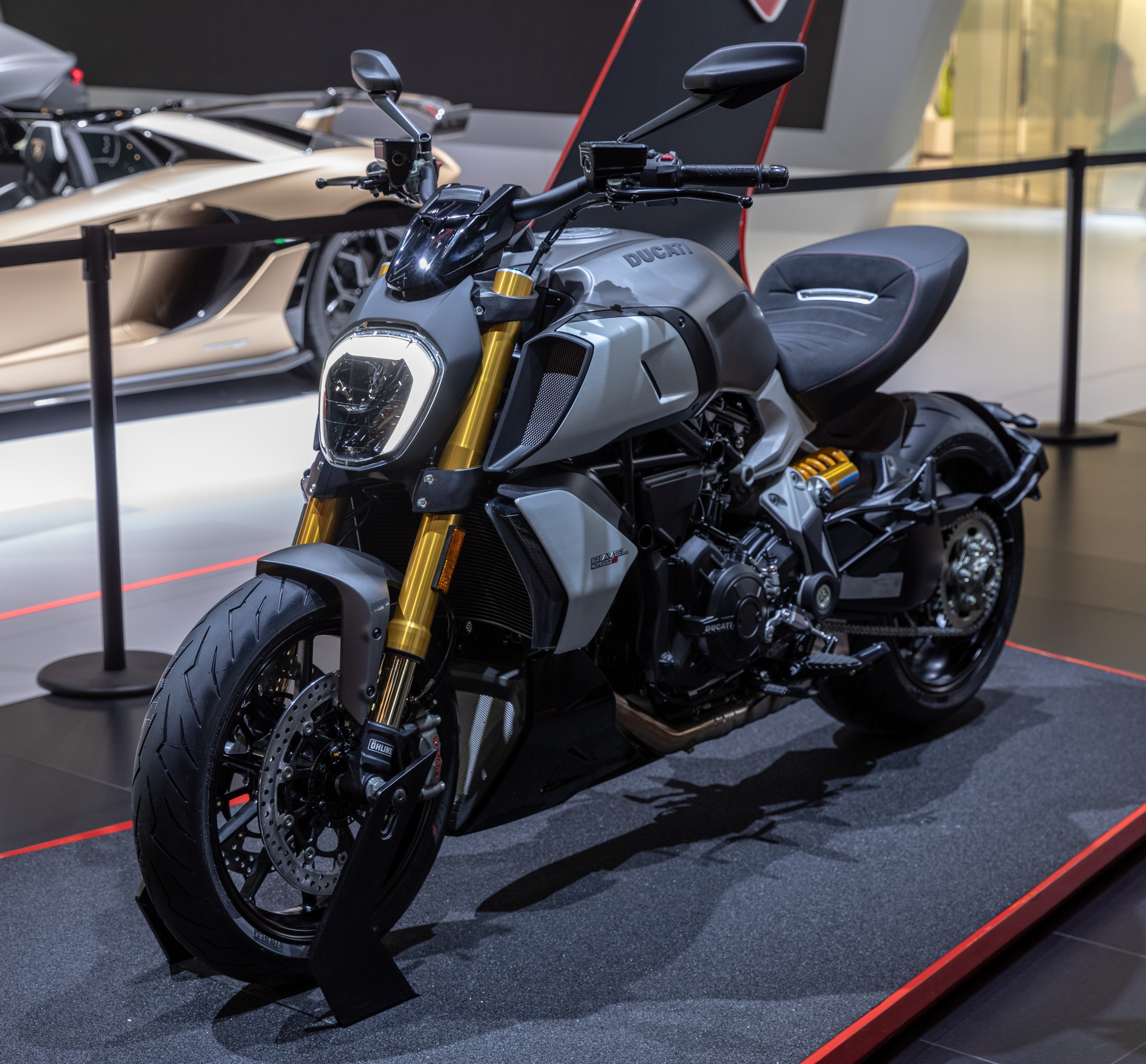
- Manufacturer: Ducati
- Production: 2010–present
- Class: Cruiser/Power cruiser
- Engine: 1,198.4 cc (73.13 cu in) 4-valve desmodromic liquid-cooled 90° L-twin engine 1,262 cc (77.0 cu in) 4-valve Testastretta DVT desmodromic liquid-cooled 90° L-twin engine (Diavel 1260 / XDiavel)
- Bore / stroke: 106.0 mm × 67.9 mm (4.17 in × 2.67 in); 106.0 mm × 71.5 mm (4.17 in × 2.81 in)
- Compression ratio: 11.5:1
- Top speed: 169 mph (272 km/h)
- Power: 162 hp (121 kW) @ 9,250 rpm (claimed)
- Torque: 130.5 N⋅m (96.3 lbf⋅ft) @ 8,800 rpm (claimed)
- Ignition type: Electronic
- Transmission: 6-speed constant-mesh Wet, hydraulic multi-plate slipper clutch
- Frame type: Steel trellis. Cast aluminium rear subframe
- Suspension: Aluminium single-sided swingarm
- Brakes: Front: 2 × 320 mm semi-floating discs, radially mounted 4-piston, Brembo callipers, radial master cylinder Rear: 265 mm disc, 2-piston calliper ABS standard Bosch-Brembo ABS
- Tires: Front: 120/70 ZR 17; Rear: 240/45 ZR17
- Rake, trail: 28°
- Wheelbase: 1,590 mm (63 in)
- Seat height: 770 mm (30 in)
- Weight: 516 lb (234 kg) (wet)
- Fuel capacity: 17 L (3.7 imp gal; 4.5 US gal)

The Ducati Diavel is the second cruiser motorcycle from Ducati after the Indiana of 1986–1990. The 2011 model year Diavel debuted in November 2010 at the EICMA motorcycle show in Milan. The second generation Diavel debuted as a 2015 model on 3 March 2014 during the Volkswagen Group Night in Geneva.

The engine is a retuned version of the 1,198.4 cc (73.13 cu in) Testastretta from the 1198 superbike, now called the Testastretta 11° for its 11° valve overlap (reduced from 41°).

Styling for the Diavel was developed in-house, although the project began under the leadership of Ducati's previous design chief, Pierre Terblanche, who commissioned Glynn Kerr, freelance designer and design columnist for Motorcycle Consumer News, to produce the initial concept sketches. In the US, most Diavel buyers appear to be existing riders age 50 and over, with more women than usual attracted to the bike, and some Harley-Davidson owners, especially V-Rod riders, trading for the new Ducati power cruiser.

For 2017 Ducati released the Ducati Diavel Diesel with a limited production of 666 bikes. The bike is a collaboration of Ducati and Diesel, a premium denim retail and fashion brand. Cycle World commented that it has an appearance of "a Mad Max-inspired retro-futuristic theme...". They also stated that the Diavel is "owner of the quickest 0–60 mph time of any production motorcycle Cycle World has ever tested".

== Revisions ==
=== Gen 1 ===
The gen 1 is the original design, featuring a round headlight with LED DRL down the center in a horizontal line. It came in two main non-limited variants, the dark, which was the standard model, and the carbon, which featured Marchesini wheels, a carbon front mud guard, carbon tank and seat cowling, and coated front suspension.

=== Gen 1.5 ===
The gen 1.5 arrived in 2015 and featured a twin spark engine. It also received a redesigned headlight and radiator vents. The two main variants remained "dark" and "carbon".

=== Special Editions / Rare Variants ===
==== AMG Edition ====
Based on the gen 1 carbon platform and released in 2012 the AMG edition has a striking, individual wheel design and redesigned radiator vents to go with its white striped paint job and ribbed seat. The engine is also tuned with handset cam timing and a new exhaust.

==== Diavel Chromo ====
A 2013 variant based on the Gen 1 dark platform, this bike features a chrome tank with classic Ducati logo, silver lower headlight shroud and gloss black seat cowling.

==== Diavel Strada ====
Introduced in 2013, the 2014 model Gen 1) has titanium tank cover, larger windscreen, revised seat, swept handlebars, nylon covered hard side bags, and passenger backrest. Side bag and backrest support structure removes the led taillights and replaces them with bug eye type tail lights. Produced for one year only.

==== Titanium Edition ====
Introduced in 2015, a limited run of 500 bikes based on the Gen 2 platform. The titanium has unique carbon intake ducts, wheels, fuel tank, headlight cowl, windscreen, seat, and seat cowling.

==== Diesel Edition ====
Limited run of 666 bikes based on the Gen 2 platform and released in 2017. The Diavel Diesel is made unique by details in hand-brushed steel with visible welds and rivets, like the tank cover, the headlight fairing and the passenger seat cover. The visible welds also appear on the anodised black side conveyors with a red methacrylate centre cover bearing an embedded Diesel logo. The red colour is also found on the LCD instrument panel, the front brake callipers and five chain links. The pipes of the exhaust system feature a Zircotec black ceramic coating. The silencers with billet endcaps are also black.

=== Xdiavel ===
In 2016, Ducati launched the Xdiavel (available in regular and S versions). With a feet-forward riding position, it was the first Ducati to use a belt final-drive. At the time of its launch, the Xdiavel was Ducati's fastest accelerating (0–60 mph) motorcycle – due to the low profile, long wheelbase, and max power low in the powerband. The 2019 Ducati XDiavel S was reported to have a 0–60 time of 2.9 seconds. The 1262cc engine produced 93 lb-ft (126 Nm) of torque at 5000 rpm, and 152 hp (112 kW) of power at 9500 rpm.

=== Diavel 1260 (Gen 2) ===
In 2019, Ducati launched the Diavel 1260 available in regular and S versions. Among other updates, the new Diavel 1260 uses the Testastretta DVT 1262 engine, a new exhaust, reduced rake, and a 63-inch wheelbase. Cycle World dyno testing found the Diavel 1260 to have 138 hp and 85 lb-ft of torque. The base Diavel 1260 was offered only in black and the S version offered only in red with white graphics.

==== Diavel 1260 Lamborghini ====
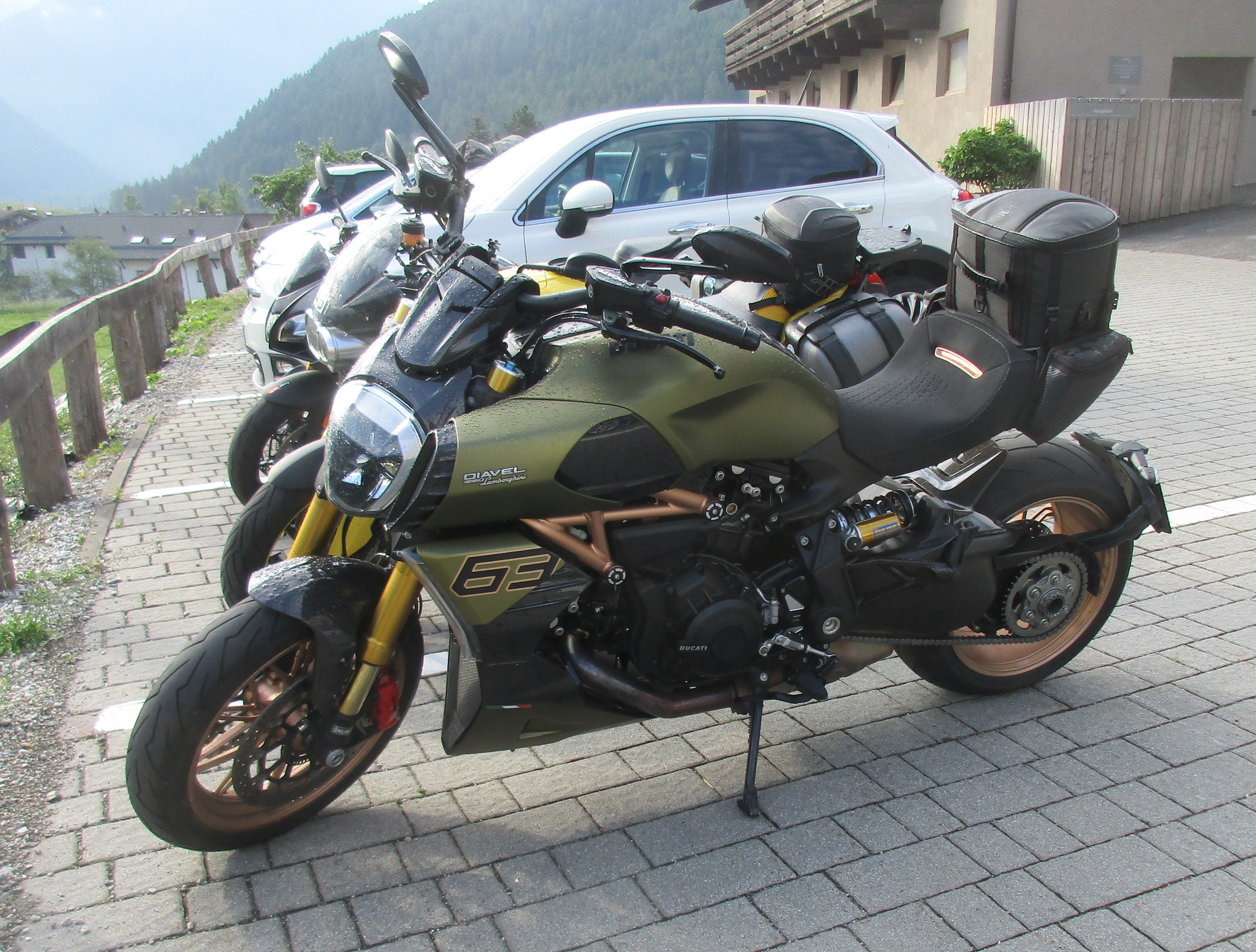
A Diavel 1260 Lamborghini (with a saddlebag on the tail of the seat)

In 2021 Ducati launched a limited run of 630 bikes, result of a partnership with Lamborghini. The new Diavel 1260 Lamborghini is strongly inspired by the Lamborghini Sián FKP 37, from which it adopted the same main color (Green Gea ) and other stylistic features of the supercar, such as the "Y" (present in some decoration of the saddle) and the hexagon (noticeable in the shape of the exhausts). Other elements that have been redesigned compared to the standard version are the air inlets, the radiator cover, the fenders, the seat covers and the rims. The exclusivity of this model is underlined by a numbered plate mounted on the frame, showing the production number of each bike, and by the number 63 on the side of the motorbike, reference both to the year Lamborghini was founded and to the number of motorcycles produced for this limited edition (630).

==== Diavel for Bentley ====
In 2023 Ducati unveiled their Diavel V4 special edition called Diavel for Bentley in partnership with Bentley at Art Basel week at Miami Beach. This special edition Diavel is inspired by Bentley's sports tourer Batur which is based on Continental GT. Keeping the limited run to 500 units, the manufacturer will also have 50 Mulliner editions, which would be more exclusive. The motorcycle borrows design cues from the Batur like side air intakes on the tank, front mudguard, saddle, triangular exhausts, Bentley logos and Metallic Scarab Green paintwork as standard the same color the Batur was unveiled the Mulliner units will be offered with custom color options. The motorcycle will be delivered in a personalized wooden case and the manufacturer will also offer inspired riding gear.

Ducati Diavel V4 RS

The Ducati Diavel V4 RS is a limited-series motorcycle produced by Ducati, introduced in September 2025 at the Misano World Circuit Marco Simoncelli during the San Marino and Rimini Riviera Grand Prix. It represents the high-performance variant of the Diavel family within Ducati’s newly established RS (Racing Sport) line. The Diavel V4 RS is powered by the 1,103 cc Desmosedici Stradale V4 engine, derived from MotoGP technology, delivering 182 horsepower (136 kW). Equipped with a counter-rotating crankshaft and desmodromic valve system, the engine provides linear torque at low revs and aggressive performance at high speeds. Ducati announced an acceleration of 0 to 100 km/h in 2.52 seconds, making it the fastest-accelerating production Ducati motorcycle to date. Technical features include Öhlins suspension, Brembo braking components from the Panigale V4, forged wheels, and a single-sided aluminum swingarm. The Diavel V4 RS also incorporates a dry clutch and an advanced electronics package designed to maximize performance and rider control. Stylistically, the model is characterized by carbon-fiber bodywork, a monoposto tail section, a dedicated RS livery, and weight reduction of approximately 3 kg compared to the standard Diavel V4. Each unit is individually numbered, with the identifier engraved on the cylinder head cover. Deliveries in Europe are scheduled to begin in December 2025.

== See also ==
- List of fastest production motorcycles
- List of fastest production motorcycles by acceleration
