= Ducati Desmosedici RR =

Racebike manufactured by Ducati

- Manufacturer: Ducati Motor Holding S.p.A.
- Production: 2007–2008
- Class: Sport bike
- Engine: 989 cc desmodromic 90° V4
- Bore / stroke: 86 mm × 42.56 mm (3.386 in × 1.676 in)
- Top speed: 303 km/h (188 mph)
- Power: 147.1 kW (197.3 hp) @ 13,800rpm (claimed); 126.6 kW (169.8 hp) (rear wheel) @ 13,250rpm
- Torque: 11.8 kg⋅m (116 N⋅m; 85 lbf⋅ft) @ 10,500rpm (claimed); 98.2 N⋅m (72.4 lb⋅ft) (rear wheel) @ 10,500rpm
- Suspension: Front 43 mm inverted fork gas-pressurized cartridge Öhlins FG353P (4.72 in.) wheel travel fully adjustable Rear Öhlins PRXB single shock (4.72 in.) wheel travel fully adjustable
- Brakes: Front Dual semi-floating 330 mm discs with dual 4-piston radial-mount Brembo monobloc calipers Rear Single 240 mm disc with opposed 2-piston caliper
- Tires: Front: 120/70 ZR17 Bridgestone BT-01F Uno; Rear:200/55ZR-16 Bridgestone BT-01R Uno
- Rake, trail: 23.5/24.5 deg. (adjustable) / 97 mm (3.8 in)
- Wheelbase: 1,430.2 mm (56.31 in)
- Seat height: 830.58 mm (32.700 in)
- Weight: 171 kg (377.0 lb) (dry); 193 kg (425 lb) (wet)
- Fuel capacity: 15 L (4.0 US gal)

The Ducati Desmosedici RR is a limited production road-legal version of the Desmosedici MotoGP racebike.

In 2004, Ducati announced at the Misano circuit at the World Ducati Week that a low volume road replica of the Desmosedici would be available for reservations beginning in June 2006. With Ducati making 1,500 Desmosedici models for public purchase.

Rear view

Ducati first showed a final production version of the bike at a press day for the '06 Italian Grand Prix at Mugello. Termed the Desmosedici RR (Racing Replica), it was claimed to be the first true road replica of a MotoGP racing bike. Priority for ordering was given to Ducati 999R owners, with production projected at one bike per day at a retail cost of US$72,500 and £40,000. The price included a three-year warranty and servicing, cover, and a racing kit including a race-only exhaust system, a slip-on muffler, and complementary fuel and ignition mapping in a "race ECU". It also included enough sponsor stickers to fill both sides of the bike. With forged magnesium wheels the Desmosedici RR was the first Ducati production bike to use them. Aprilia used them in 2002 on their limited edition RSV Mille SP.

The Ducati Desmosedici RR production started beginning in October 2007 till December 2008, and the first customer orders delivered from January 2008.

== See also ==
- List of fastest production motorcycles by acceleration
