= Suzuki RF series =

Sport touring motorcycles

RF900R
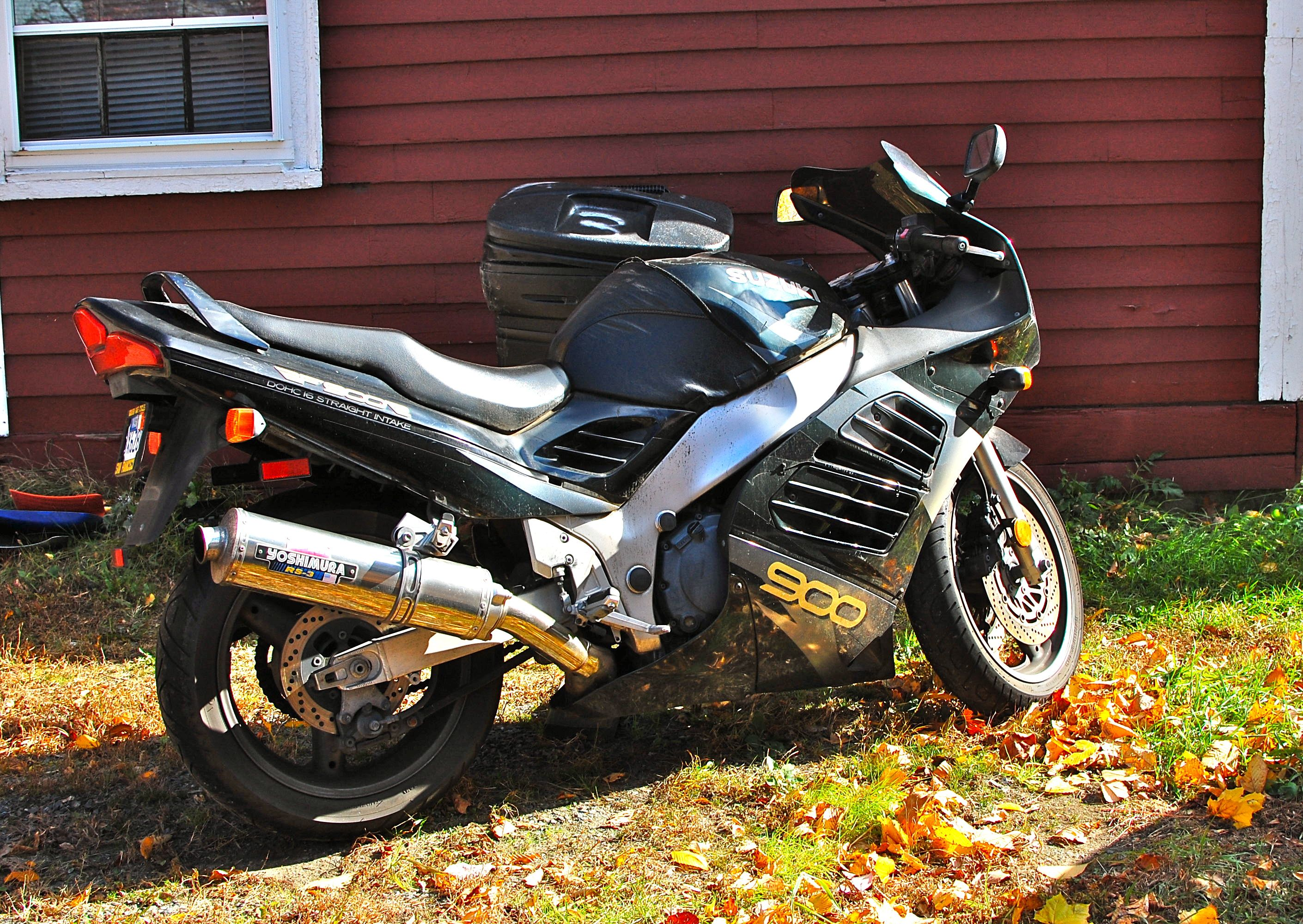
- Suzuki RF 900R
- Manufacturer: Suzuki
- Also called: RF9
- Production: 1994–1999
- Class: Sport touring
- Engine: 937 cc (57.2 cu in) DOHC 4-stroke inline-4
- Bore / stroke: 73.0 mm × 56.0 mm (2.87 in × 2.20 in)
- Compression ratio: 11.3:1
- Top speed: 162 mph (261 km/h)
- Power: 135 hp (101 kW) @ 10,000 rpm (crank)
- Torque: 70 ft⋅lbf (95 N⋅m) @ 9,000 rpm (crank)
- Transmission: 5-speed constant mesh, manual chain drive
- Suspension: Front: telescopic fork, 43 mm cartridge type, coil spring, oil damped, adjustable spring preload (all years) and rebound damping force (only on 96+ models); Rear: link type w/ coil over single shock, 7-way adjustable spring preload, 4-way adjustable rebound damping force, gas charged with oil damping, compression damping fully adjustable.
- Brakes: Front: Dual Nissin 4 piston (Staggered Diameter) brake calipers on 310 mm floating discs Rear: Single hydraulic 240 mm disc brake
- Tires: Front: 120/70-ZR17 on 3-spoke cast aluminum wheels Front recommended pressure: 36 psi Rear: 170/60-ZR17 on 3-spoke cast aluminum wheels Rear recommended pressure: 36 psi
- Wheelbase: 56 in (1,422 mm)
- Dimensions: L: 83.9 in (2,130 mm); W: 28.7 in (730 mm); H: 45.9 in (1,170 mm)
- Seat height: 31.7 in (810 mm)
- Weight: 203 kg (448 lb) (dry)
- Fuel capacity: 5.5 Gallons (21 L)
- Fuel consumption: 18.5 km/L (43.5 mpg_{‑US})
- Related: RF400R; RF600R; RF900R

The Suzuki RF series are sport touring motorcycles. They came with three engine variations: 400 cc (24 cu in), 600 cc (37 cu in) and 900 cc (55 cu in). It was in production from 1994 to 1999.

== Powerplants and fueling ==
The 600 cc and 900 cc version are both based on the GSX1100R bottom end – a 16-valve inline-four, four-stroke, water-cooled unit. The RF has smaller carburetors (Mikuni BDST36 36 mm downdraughts), and smaller valves. This results in a smoother power delivery and a more usable engine. The engine is canted forwards in the frame by 19 degrees to allow for a lower center of gravity, and allows the fuel air mixture to be "dropped" into the cylinders on the intake stroke. This also allows for a 6-litre airbox. The 900 cc engine has a redline of 12,000 rpm (although maximum power is achieved before this at 10,000 rpm), and the 600 cc engine has a slightly higher 13,500 rpm redline.

There is no fuel gauge, however a "fuel low" light is present, which gets brighter as the reserve level is approached. Filling up at the lowest brightness of the light will result in only half the fuel capacity of the motorcycle being used. The bike has a 4 L (0.88 imp gal; 1.1 US gal) reserve, switched to with the usual fuel cock on the left hand seat unit fairing.

The 400 cc version is somewhat different, and uses the engine from the GSF400 fitted with 32 mm Mikuni carburetors.

The 900 uses a stainless 4-2-1 exhaust header while the 600 and 400 bikes use steel 4-1 headers. The later 600, and all the 900 versions use a tri-bolt can fitment. The earlier 600 and all 400 RF bikes use a slip on with link pipe system, with a join below the center of the bike.

== Cooling ==
The RF series uses a U-shaped water-filled radiator, which allows the engine to sit lower, and closer to the front wheel. The oil filter is also water-cooled, and there is a cooling fan fitted to the rear of the radiator. This is effective at cooling the motorcycle to the point where it can be used happily at 9,000 ft without overheating. There is a temperature gauge for monitoring water temperature.

== Transmission ==
The 900 cc model is fitted with a 5-speed constant mesh box (using the exact parts from its elder GSXR1100 brother), while the 400 and 600 use 6-speed versions to make the most of the smaller displacement power units. The lubrication of the gearbox and clutch is shared with the crank and engine lubrication. The 900 uses a RK532GSV2 x 110 links chain, although can be converted to use more readily available specifications. The 600 uses a RK50MF0Z1 x 108 links chain. The usual 1-N-2-3-4-5(-6) gearbox shifting pattern is observed. The 900 uses a hydraulically actuated clutch, while the 600 and 400 use cable actuation.

== Chassis and braking ==
A hollow steel perimeter frame is used to reduce size and cost as well as improve comfort. Achieving the same strength with aluminum would require much larger frame spars making the frame much wider (and less comfortable). The hollow steel frame allows leg reliefs which are blended into the contours of the tank and bodywork.

In 1996, Suzuki upgraded the front forks on the 900 providing rebound adjustment (though compression is still non-adjustable in all years). The external dimensions of the earlier and later forks are identical so they are a direct bolt-on replacement. However, many choose to spend the equivalent money on a Racetech cartridge upgrade which provides better damping than the 96+ forks.

The OEM suspension provides a reasonable amount of comfort yet remains composed while riding across real-world road surfaces even when the pace crests triple digits. Only in a track environment will the RF suspension become a limiting factor. Braking is good from the stock Nissin brakes, which benefit significantly with upgraded steel braided brake lines.

== World record ==
The facts:

- Date: June 4/5, 1993
- Team: Suzuki Germany, Metzeler, German motorcycle magazine Motorrad
- Bikes: 2 RF900R, red and black prepared from the Suzuki mechanics Michael Schellig and Klaus Schimo
- Power: 125 hp at 10900 rpm
- Tyres: Metzeler, serial carcass and tread design but modified tread compound, 120/70 ZR17 ME Z1, 180/55 ZR17 ME Z2, 2.5/2.9 bar
- Fuel: leaded super 98 octane
- Oil: Castrol RS
- Modifications: No main and sidestand, longer windshield, red battery-supplied emergency lamp, fast tankclosing, LCD speedometer, 2 infrared sensors for rear tyre temperature, 100W headlight, positioning lights, carbs adjusted rich due to overheating, 1 mufflerplate removed.
- Riders: 18: Salvatore Pennisi, Waldemar Schwarz, Walter Villa, Rainer Jänisch, Yves Briguet, Andreas Bronnen, Rainer Bäumel, Helmut Faidt, Hartmut Skora, Dorothea Späth, etc.
- Commission: FIM (Federation Internationale Motocycliste)

Worldrecords:

| Time | Distance | Average Speed |
|---|---|---|
| 1hr | 256 km (159m) | 260.491 km/h (161.896mp/h) |
| 6hrs | 1514 km (941m) | 252.341 km/h (156.831mp/h) |
| 12h | 3022 km (1878m) | 251.835 km/h (156.516mp/h) |
| 24h | 5904 km (3669m) | 246.000 km/h (152.890mp/h) |

Fastest lap average: 268,965 km/h (167,163 mph) at 7:05 am, when the air had the highest oxygen concentration
