= Suzuki GSX-R1100 =

GSX-R1100
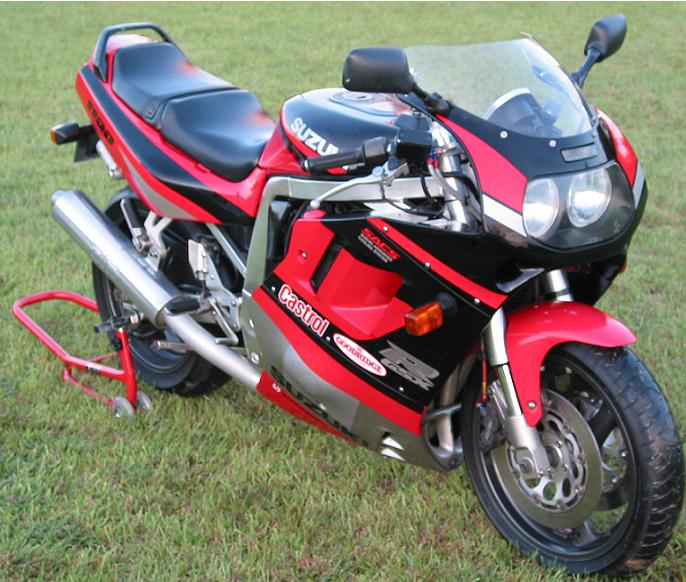
- 1991 GSX-R1100 in Yoshimura team colors.
- Manufacturer: Suzuki
- Production: 1986–1998
- Successor: GSX-R1000
- Class: Sport bike
- Engine: 1,074 cc (65.5 cu in) 4-stroke 16-valve DOHC inline-4
- Bore / stroke: 75.5 mm × 60.0 mm (2.97 in × 2.36 in)
- Top speed: 163 mph (262 km/h)
- Power: 155 hp (114 kW); 122.6 hp (91.4 kW) at 9,250 rpm(rear wheel)
- Torque: 75 lb⋅ft (102 N⋅m) at 7,000 rpm(rear wheel)
- Transmission: 5-speed sequential manual, chain-drive
- Brakes: Front: Dual disc Rear: Disc
- Wheelbase: 1,485 mm (58.5 in)
- Weight: 222 kg (489 lb) (dry); 251.5 kg (554 lb) (wet)
- Fuel capacity: 21 L (5.5 US gal)

The Suzuki GSX-R1100 is a sport bike from Suzuki's GSX-R series of motorcycles produced from 1986 until 1998.

== Background ==
In the mid-1970s, the motorcycle industry was in a period of transition and pollution concerns led to large two-stroke motorcycles being banned from the streets in many countries. There were not many purpose-built four-stroke sport bikes, most of which were derivatives of regular motorcycles. Those built by Japanese manufacturers were built around an in-line four-cylinder, air-cooled engine wrapped in a steel double cradle frame, most of which were similar enough that they became known as the Universal Japanese Motorcycle (UJM).

Seeing an unfulfilled market position, Suzuki, which had made its reputation by building two strokes, built its first large four-stroke bikes- the dual overhead camshaft (DOHC) GS750 and the GS400 for the American market in 1976 (see: Suzuki GS series). The GS550 arrived soon after and by 1978 the formidable GS1000 were impressing customers everywhere. 1980 saw the introduction of the 16-valve DOHC engine. It also witnessed the creation of the then extremely radical and influential Suzuki Katana, a bike stylistically resembling a modern sport bike on the outside but largely built on existing technology of the day, although Suzuki were very quick to adopt the DOHC 16-valve cylinder head with their GSX 1100 range (including the Katana) in 1980.

In 1983 Honda introduced the VF750 Interceptor (see: Honda VF and VFR), a radically innovative bike that set the trend for modern sport bikes. Kawasaki followed suit in 1984 with its Kawasaki GPZ900R Ninja.

Meanwhile, Suzuki soldiered on with their powerful but heavy air-cooled 16-valve DOHC GS1100/GSX1100EZ/GSX1100EF/EG. The GSX750ES was well regarded, especially for its fine handling, but again also was another machine that represented the most refined development of its own current generation. At Suzuki it was felt that something much newer was needed for the future, both in chassis and engine terms.

By the mid-1980s the motorcycle industry was in a period of decline. Honda and Yamaha had engaged in a production war in order to decide who would become the world's largest motorcycle manufacturer, resulting in oversupply. Brand new bikes went unsold, stacked up in warehouses and dealers' floors. For many years after, consumers could buy new old stock bikes, a previous year's model that had lain in its packing crate for years waiting to be sold, for the fraction of the price of a new bike.

== Development ==
In the midst of this market, Etsuo Yokouchi and his team of designers began work on a bike intended to change the market and outperform Honda's Interceptor. They began in 1983 on Suzuki's domestic market Gamma 250 with the goal of producing a lightweight two-stroke for the streets. The RG250 was the world's first production alloy framed motorcycle. Building upon the Gamma's success, Suzuki introduced the four-cylinder, four-stroke, aluminum framed GSX-R400 in 1984 for the Japanese market. A full 18 percent lighter than comparable bikes on the market, the first GSX-R set the tone for those that would follow. "I felt that if we could do a 400 cc bike that was 18 percent lighter, we should be able to do the same with a 750", recalls Mr. Yokouchi.

Using a current model GS/GSX750ES as a starting point, Yokouchi's team went through every part, reducing weight wherever possible. A new aluminum frame was engineered in a distinctive shape with square tubes stretching back over and around the top of the engine, then turning sharply downwards just past the carburettors to beneath the engine where they met the lower tubes. This design, unheard of at the time, would soon become familiar to a generation of motorcyclists and is often referred to as the "humpback" frame. Where welding would have added unnecessary weight aircraft quality rivets were used. Weight was reduced further and further until parts failed to make the bike as light as practicable.

To save more weight, the suspension was engineered differently from most bikes of the day. The top of the shock was mounted solidly to the frame while the bottom was attached to a banana shaped linkage that housed an eccentric cam below the swing arm. The resulting system was lightweight, progressive and lowered the bike's overall centre of gravity.

While the engine used was a DOHC, four valve per cylinder design typical of most contemporary motorcycles, it had unique features that set it apart from other air-cooled designs of the day. The GSX-R used oil to cool parts of the engine otherwise unreachable by air, like the top of the combustion chamber. To provide enough oil for both cooling and lubrication, the team designed a double chamber pump, using the high-pressure side to lubricate the bearings while the low-pressure, high-volume side provided oil to the cooling circuit. The result became known as the Suzuki Advanced Cooling System (SACS). The resulting motorcycle was rigorously tested to its breaking point: weaknesses found and re-engineered until the bugs were worked out.

Many of the bike's non mechanical design features were dictated by concerns other than pure mechanics. The flat front fascia and trade mark dual headlight were incorporated because designers wanted to give the bike the look of an endurance racer and because regulations dictated that the headlight be behind the front axle. The wide plastic panels under the seat were added to hide an unsightly exhaust hanger.

The resulting GSX-R750 was introduced in 1985 but withheld from the United States due to tariff issues which would have imposed a 39.4 percent tax on each bike because it was over 700 CC. By waiting until 1986, Suzuki saved buyers money as the tax dropped to 24.4 percent. In the intervening year, Suzuki responded to European riders' complaints about the bike's stability by lengthening the swing arm by one inch.

With the ground work laid by earlier, smaller bikes, Suzuki introduced the GSX-R1100 in 1986. The technology mirrored that of the GSX-R750 but added big bore power (137 hp (102 kW)), to the mix while keeping the bike as light as possible (434 pounds).

== Model history ==
As motorcycles have evolved, perspectives on the GSX-R1100 have changed. When the bike was new, magazines lauded its power, handling and relative lack of weight. But today's authors who compare it against 1994's introduction of the Supersports bikes, driven by Tadao Baba's development of the Honda Fireblade, can use 20/20 hindsight to be more critical. Recent articles (some in comparison with newer sport bikes) still rave about the powerful 1100 cc engine but otherwise describe the GSX-R1100 as large, heavy, and unstable. Some of these assertions were borne out by Suzuki's year-to-year tinkering with the frame geometry in order to make the bike handle better. The result is that different years have different handling characteristics on the road. Earlier bikes are lighter but the square-section alloy frame is prone to warping under extreme stress while later models are more rigid and offer increased power but suffer from increased weight.

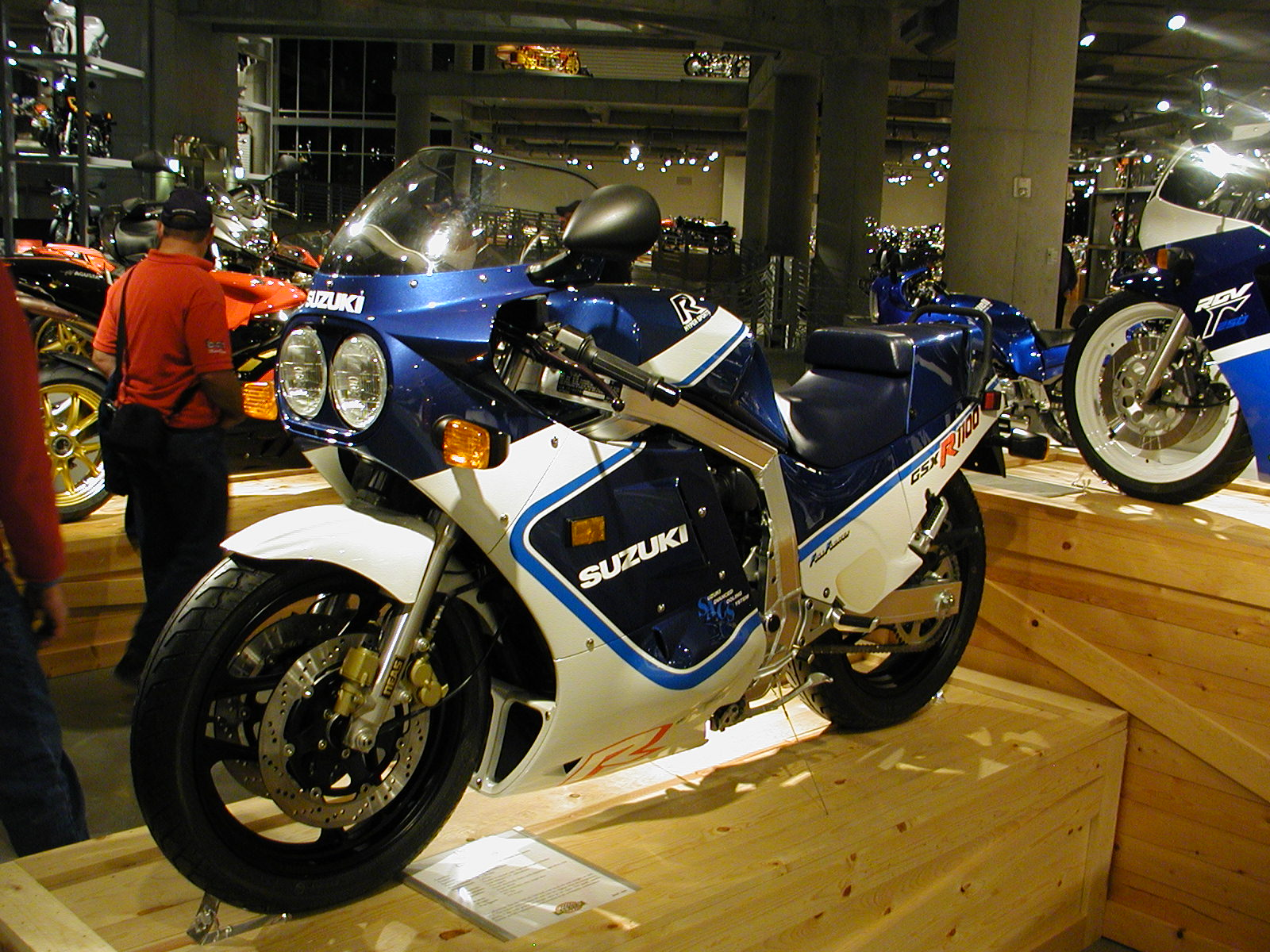
1987 Suzuki GSX-R1100

The original bikes had square-section alloy frames, 18-inch wheels front and rear and a large endurance-style fairing. The early version of the engine was 1052 cc in capacity and with greater similarity to the 750 cc than later versions. The GSX-R1100's frame was somewhat stiffer than the frame on the GSX-R750 - the box section is noticeably thicker when compared side to side. Handling was secure, but not particularly fast. The brakes consisted of two full floating discs at the front gripped by two Sumitomo four-piston calipers and a small fixed disc gripped by a twin-piston caliper at the rear; Suzuki referred to this as the "Deca Piston" setup. Over three years of production there were only minor changes, the largest being the switch to heavier three-spoke wheels on the last J model.

The 1989 "K" model introduced the 1100 cc engine (the first use of the now legendary, highly tunable and strong 1127 cc air/oil cooled design) together with a new heavier, shorter and stiffer frame based on the previous year's updated and extremely well received GSX-R750J. Magazine testers gave it rave reviews but noted that something was changed between then and the bikes going on sale. The Slingshot 1100K sold in shops suffered handling problems: either as a result of changed geometry or that it was the suspension units that were improperly set up.

Whatever it was, the standard bike was considered hard to handle and many modern magazines went as far as to advice buyers to avoid the "K" model (some even calling that year's model a "lemon"). This opinion was reinforced with the death of Suzuki racer Phil Mellor at the Isle of Man TT in 1989 on the GSX-R-1100K race bike. Jamie Whitham also crashed in the same race and it was enough to see the race authorities at the IOM ban the big bikes from racing for several years.

In 1990, the "L" model bike was again tweaked and the wheelbase lengthened to correct the previous year's handling problems. The M-model (1991) saw the addition of larger carburetors and major cosmetic changes when the fairing was reworked to place the headlights under a more aerodynamic curved cover. The "N" model (1992) was mechanically the same but offered more aggressive graphics in line with its time. It was also the last year of the oil-cooled engines as the bike was re-designed for 1993.

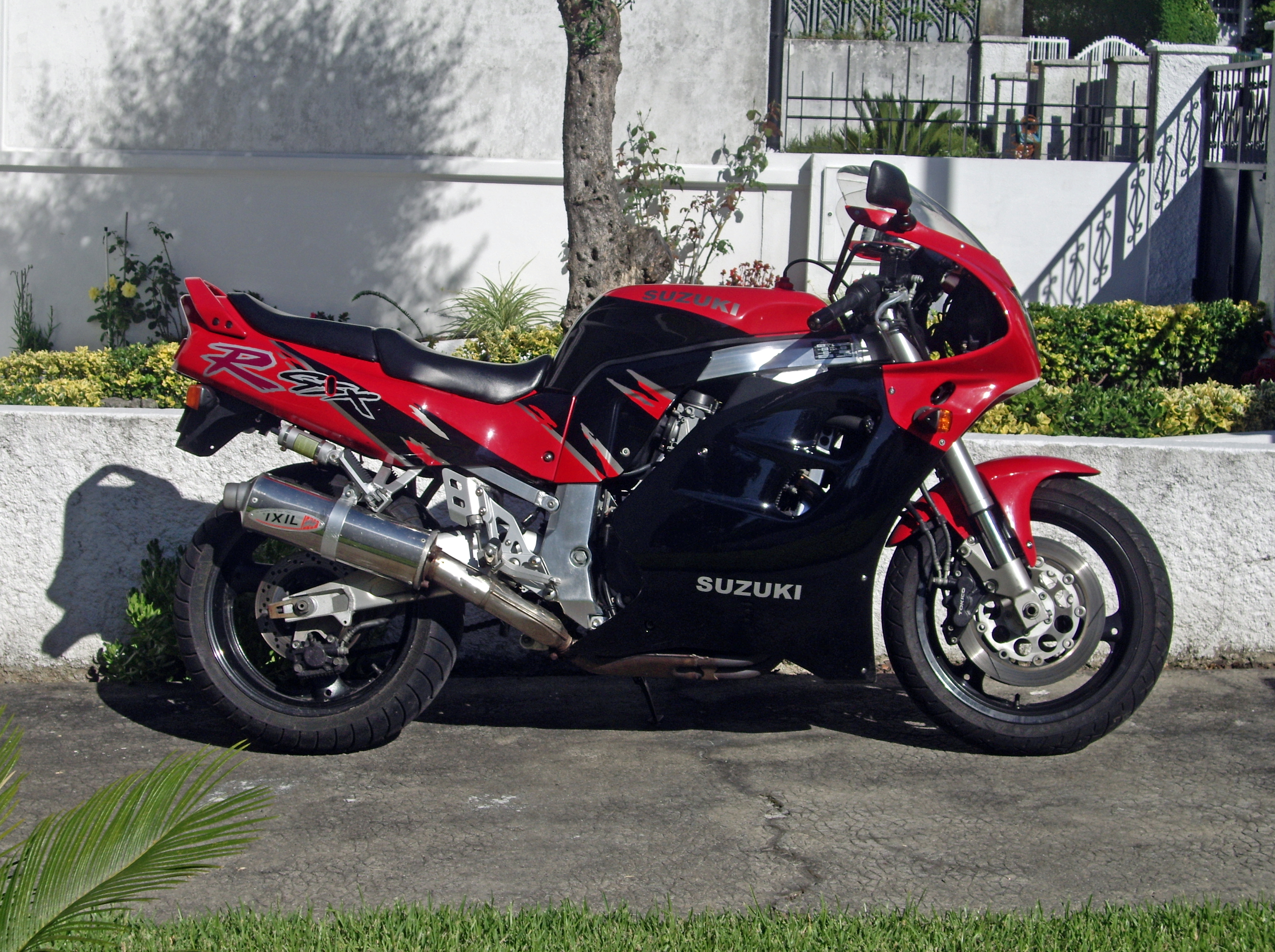
1993 Suzuki GSX-R1100 (WP)

The 1993 "WP" model saw major engine changes with the introduction of water cooling and several significant chassis changes. The move away from oil cooling allowed an increase in power, bringing total output to 155 hp (114 kW) at the crank and introduced another very strong, reliable and extremely tunable Suzuki engine (Performance Bike in the UK reported on one taken to over 190 bhp at the wheel without the use of a turbocharger or nitrous oxide injection).

A new stiffer, largely forged, five-sided pentagonal cross-section frame was introduced along with an asymmetrical "banana" swing-arm. Larger Nissin six-piston brake calipers were fitted. The bike's weight also went up slightly, finally passing the 500-pound mark Suzuki had been flirting with for years, but the overall look of the bike remained essentially the same as previous models. The 1994 "WR" only saw color changes.

Throughout the water-cooled years (1993–1998), the GSX-R's design saw only one major revision with the launch of the 1995 "WS"; everything else on the 1996 "WT", 1997 "WV" and 1998 "WW" models were restricted to color and graphics changes.

In keeping with the usual model development this followed many of the same changes introduced to previous year's GSX-R750WR (also known as the SP). Minor but significant changes were made to the suspension (better quality 43 mm USD forks replaced the 41 mm USD forks used on the WP and WR models), the ignition and the cams (putting back the stack of bottom end and mid range pull many believed had gone AWOL with the WP and WR models).

The 1995 WS and onward models also featured a race-style braced swingarm (in place of the asymmetrical "banana" swingarm found on the WP and WR models). Overall peak power (approximately 133 bhp at the rear wheel - which made the enormous factory claims of 155 bhp at the crank credible) was unchanged but the torque curve on the bike was improved. The 1995 models saw weight reduced to 221 kg (487 lb) in the UK market. Some aerodynamic modifications were also introduced: most obviously narrowing the frontal area and reducing the size of the front fairing, while the separate daytime running lights were removed and incorporated into a new narrower twin headlamp cluster.

These bikes are considered the easiest to live with and the most well rounded. Good fuel economy is possible (over 15.9 km/L at cruising speeds) and slight changes made to the foot peg position on the WS-on models made longer distances less daunting. The bike had become a highly competent and monstrously fast sports-touring machine: Superbike measured the WS model achieving a top speed of 177 mph in 1995 sports-touring machine; a far cry from its race-born origins.

The design had reached its fullest form in the mid-1990s - but in terms of cutting-edge sports bike design, it was outdated and left behind as competition spurred the development of more powerful, lighter sport bikes. This was demonstrated most clearly than Suzuki's own brand-new 1996 GSX-R750WT, a return to the ultra-lightweight with a new "SRAD" beam frame, which offered approx 115 bhp at the rear wheel when coupled with the added boost from the new pressurized airbox design (always particularly efficient on Suzuki's - Fast Bikes in the UK once measured a full 10 bhp increase in power on the Crescent Racing shop's dyno and wind tunnel at 120 mph in 2003 with a GSX-R1000). All at a chassis weight "cost" on the GSX-R750WT of only 179 kg (394 lb).

Clearly Suzuki were returning the GSX-Rs to their race-bred roots. While Suzuki showed a great attachment to the cradle frame however, that the GSX-R250 and GSX-R400 used an alloy beam frame in the 1986-1989 (inclusive) model years.

1998 saw the last GSX-R1100s roll off the assembly line and - despite its popularity in its heyday - there were no complaints as production was quietly stopped. Suzuki would be without a big-bore sport bike for three years before the GSX-R1000 was released.

Despite tens of thousands of GSX-R1100s being produced and sold all over the world, original examples in good condition have become uncommon. Many were ridden hard and often crashed. As a result, they became and remain a popular starting point for street fighter modifications and customs.
