= BMW K1300S =

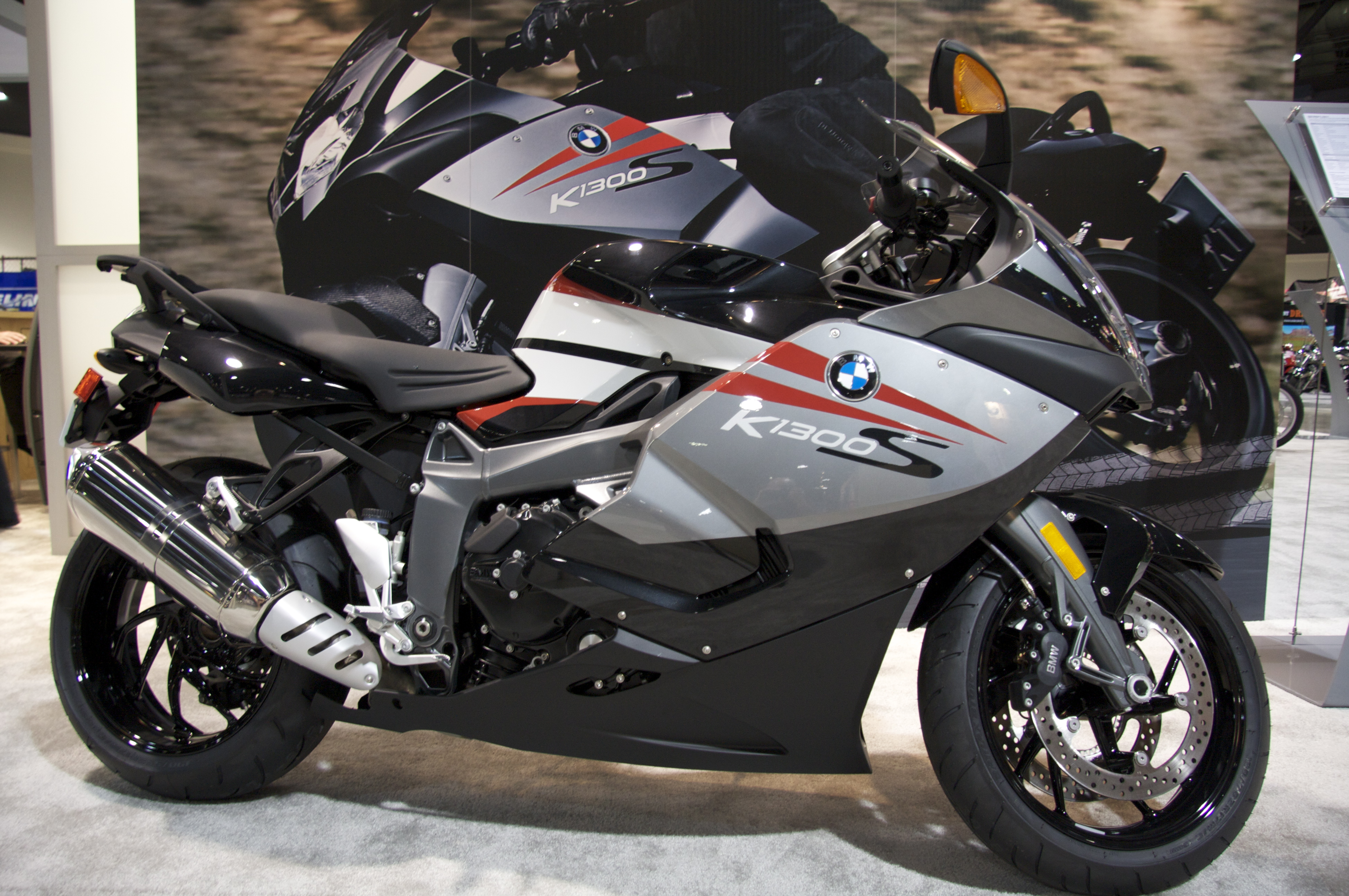
- Manufacturer: BMW Motorrad
- Production: 2008-2016
- Predecessor: BMW K1200S
- Class: Sport bike
- Engine: 1,293 cc (78.9 cu in) inline four
- Bore / stroke: 80.0 mm × 64.3 mm (3.15 in × 2.53 in)
- Compression ratio: 13:1
- Top speed: 174.5 mph (280.8 km/h)
- Power: 175 hp (130 kW) (claimed); 146.9 hp (109.5 kW) (rear wheel); 151.9 hp (113.3 kW) (rear wheel)
- Torque: 103 lb⋅ft (140 N⋅m) (claimed); 89.6 lb⋅ft (121.5 N⋅m) (rear wheel); 91.6 lb⋅ft (124.2 N⋅m) (rear wheel)
- Frame type: Bridge-type frame, cast aluminum, load-bearing engine
- Suspension: Front Duolever Electronically adjustable with ESA II; Rear Paralever Electronically adjustable with ESA II
- Brakes: Front Dual Brembo calipers four-piston Rear Brembo caliper two-piston
- Tires: 120/70ZR-17 Metzeler Sportec M3,190/55ZR-17 Metzeler Sportec M3
- Rake, trail: 29.6°, 4.1 in (100 mm)
- Wheelbase: 62.4 in (1,580 mm)
- Dimensions: L: 2,180 mm (86.0 in); W: 900 mm (35.6 in); H: 1,220 mm (48.0 in)
- Seat height: 820 mm (32.3 in)
- Weight: 503 lb (228 kg) (dry); 569 lb (258 kg) (wet)
- Fuel capacity: 19 L; 4.2 imp gal (5.0 US gal)

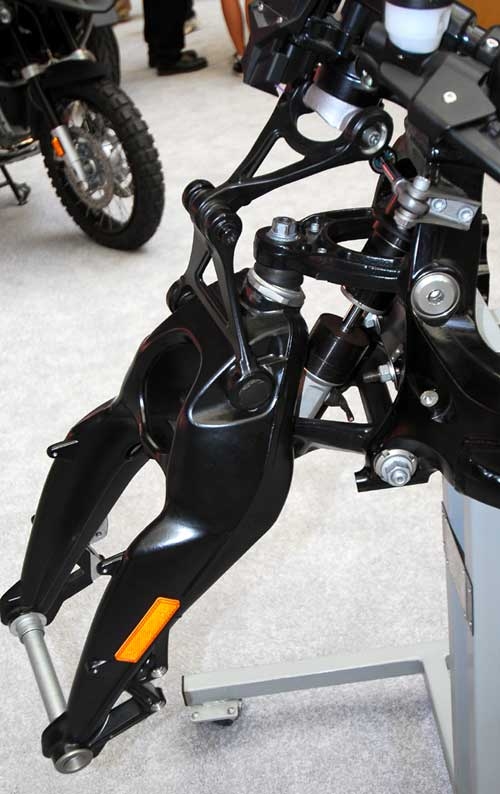
The top of the Duolever suspension

The BMW K1300S is a motorcycle introduced in October 2008. It replaced the outgoing K1200S which had been in production since September 2004. The K1300S features an increase in engine capacity of 136cc over the K1200S, an increase in power to 175 hp (130 kW), newly styled fairings and a new exhaust system. Motorcyclist tested a quarter mile time of 10.62 sec. @ 133.03 mph.

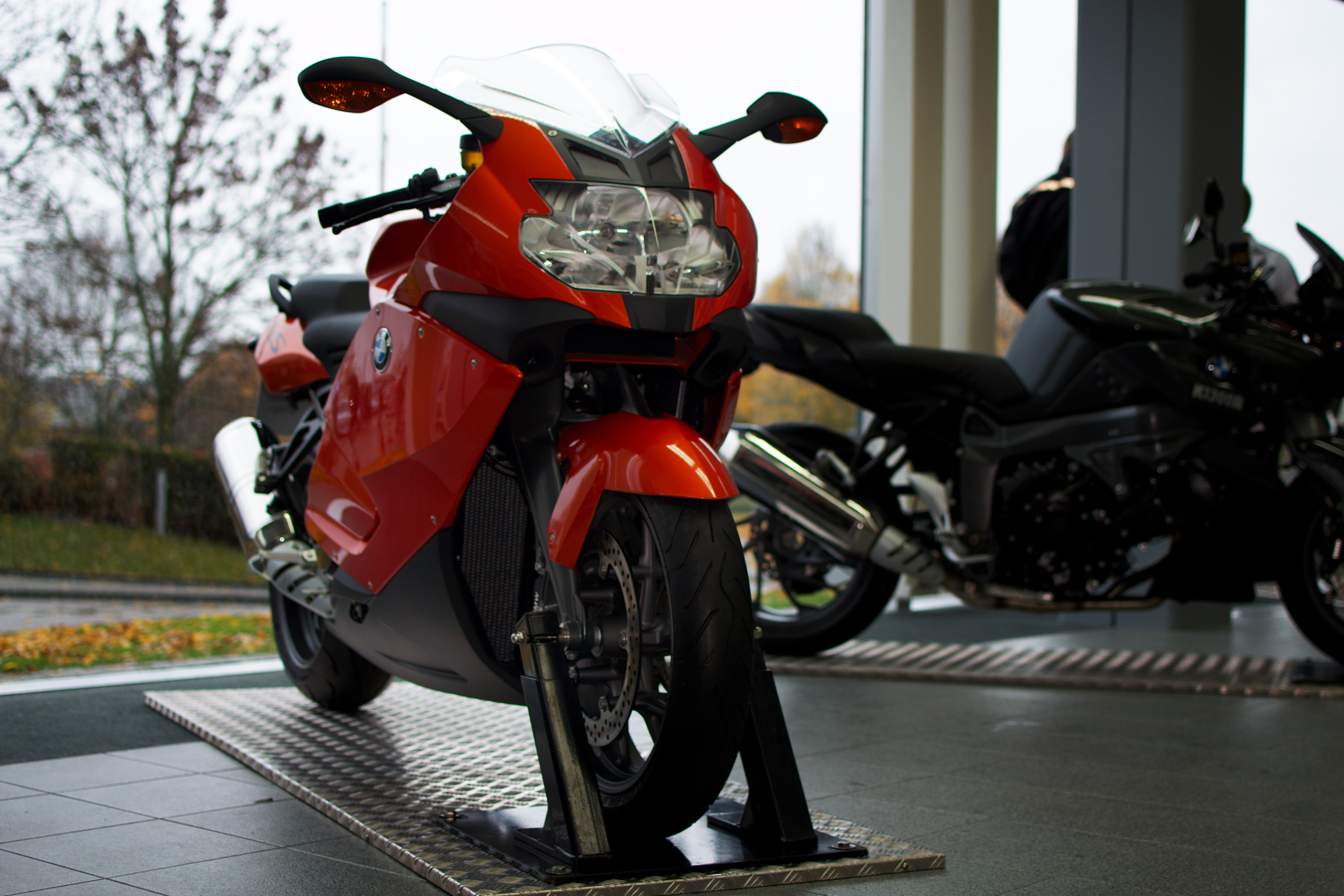
BMW K1300S front view

Production ended in 2016.
