= Superdude =

Superdude or Super Dude may refer to:

- Super Dude, 1973 album by Don Covay
- Hangup, 1974 film also released under the title Super Dude
- A hamster referred to in 1995 The Simpsons television episode Who Shot Mr. Burns?
- Superdude (TV series) an Indian reality show that ran for two seasons ending in 2012
- KTM 1290 Super Duke R, a motorcycle built by manufacturer KTM - sometimes referred to as "Super Dude"
