= BMW S1000XR =

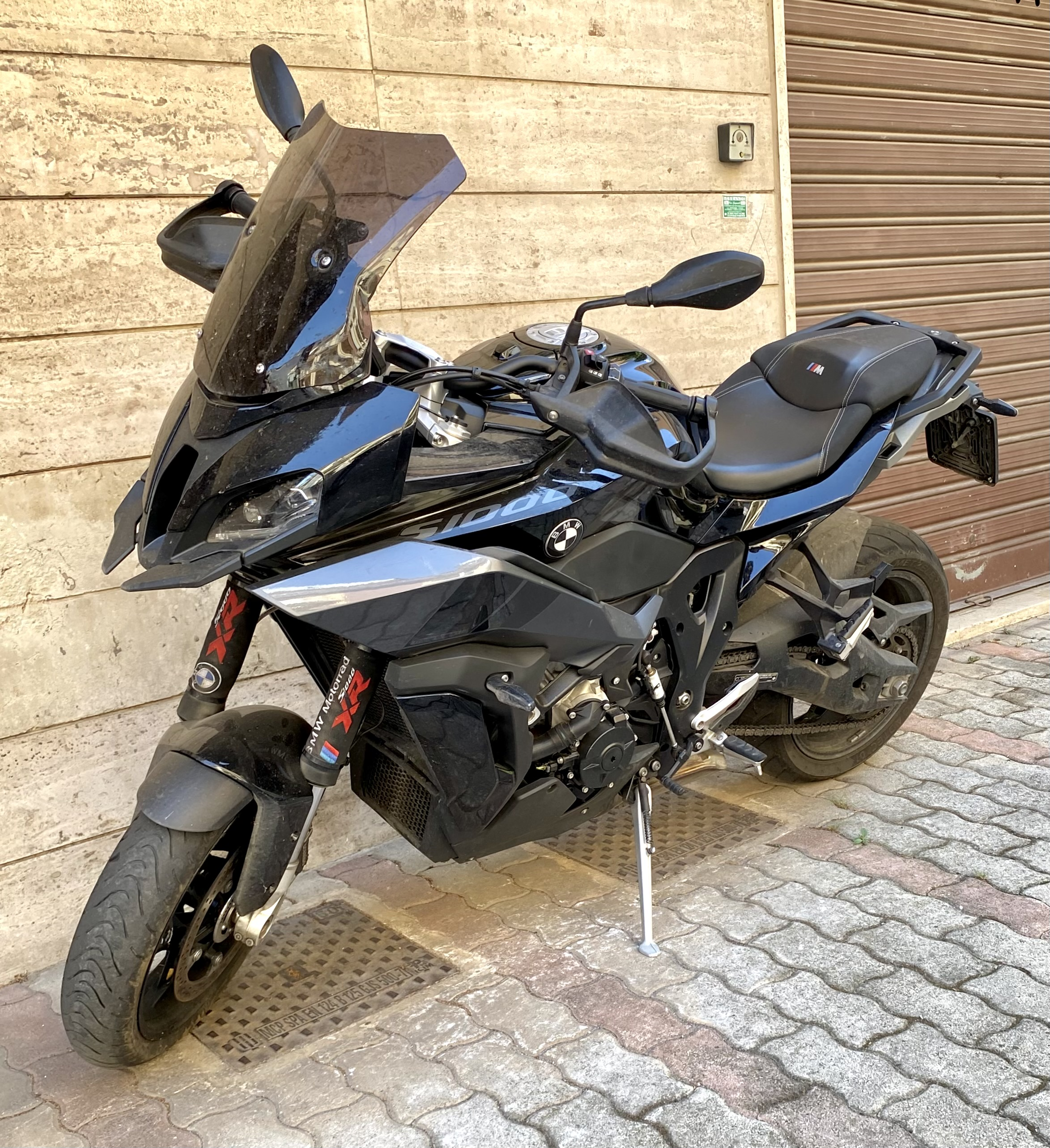
- Manufacturer: BMW Motorrad
- Production: 2015–present
- Class: Sport touring
- Engine: 999 cc (61.0 cu in) liquid-cooled 4-stroke 16-valve DOHC inline-four
- Bore / stroke: 80 mm × 49.7 mm (3.1 in × 2.0 in)
- Compression ratio: 12.0:1
- Top speed: 274 km/h (170 mph) (estimated)
- Transmission: 6-speed constant mesh, chain final drive
- Suspension: Front: Inverted 46 mm (1.8 in) telescopic fork, compression and rebound stage adjustable; Rear: Aluminium swingarm, rebound damping adjustable monoshock
- Brakes: Front: Radially-mounted Brembo 4-piston caliper with dual 320 mm (12.6 in) discs; Rear: Single-piston caliper with single 220 mm (8.7 in) disc
- Tires: Front: 120/70–17; Rear: 190/55–17
- Wheelbase: 1,548 mm (60.9 in)
- Dimensions: L: 2,183 mm (85.9 in); W: 940 mm (37.0 in); H: 1,408 mm (55.4 in)
- Fuel capacity: 20 L (4.4 imp gal; 5.3 US gal) (4 L (0.9 imp gal; 1.1 US gal) reserve)
- Related: BMW S1000R; BMW S1000RR

The BMW S1000XR (officially designated as BMW S 1000 XR) is a sport touring motorcycle produced by BMW Motorrad since 2015. The all-rounder motorcycle was presented on 4 November 2014 at the EICMA, Milan, Italy.

The partially faired motorcycle is technically based on the S1000R naked bike and is marketed by the manufacturer as an "Adventure Sport Bike". After the fully enclosed sport bikes S1000RR and HP4 as well as the roadster S1000R, the XR is the fourth variant with the inline four-cylinder engine and assembled at the BMW plant in Berlin. The production started on 1 April 2015 and went on sale on 13 June.

== Generations ==
=== First Generation (2015–2019) ===
- Introduction: The first generation of the S1000XR was introduced in 2015.
- Engine: Powered by a 999 cc inline-four engine derived from the S1000R and S1000RR models.
- Performance: It featured a power output of 160 hp and a top speed of around 170 mph.
- Technology: Included features like adjustable suspension, multiple riding modes, ABS, traction control, and a partially faired design.
- Design: The design combined elements of sport and adventure bikes, offering a comfortable riding position and good wind protection.

=== Second Generation (2020–present) ===
- Introduction: The second generation was introduced in 2020.
- Engine: Updated 999 cc inline-four engine, now compliant with Euro 5 emissions standards.
- Performance: Improved performance with a slight increase in power output and enhanced torque delivery.
- Technology: Significant technological advancements, including a new 6.5-inch TFT display with connectivity features, updated electronics, refined riding modes, and Dynamic ESA (Electronic Suspension Adjustment).
- Design: A more refined and aggressive design, with improved aerodynamics and lighter weight. The frame and swingarm were updated for better handling and stability.
- Additional Features: New features like Hill Start Control, cruise control, and optional accessories for enhanced touring capabilities.
