= KTM 1290 Super Duke R =

Streetfighter motorcycle

KTM 1290 Super Duke R/GT
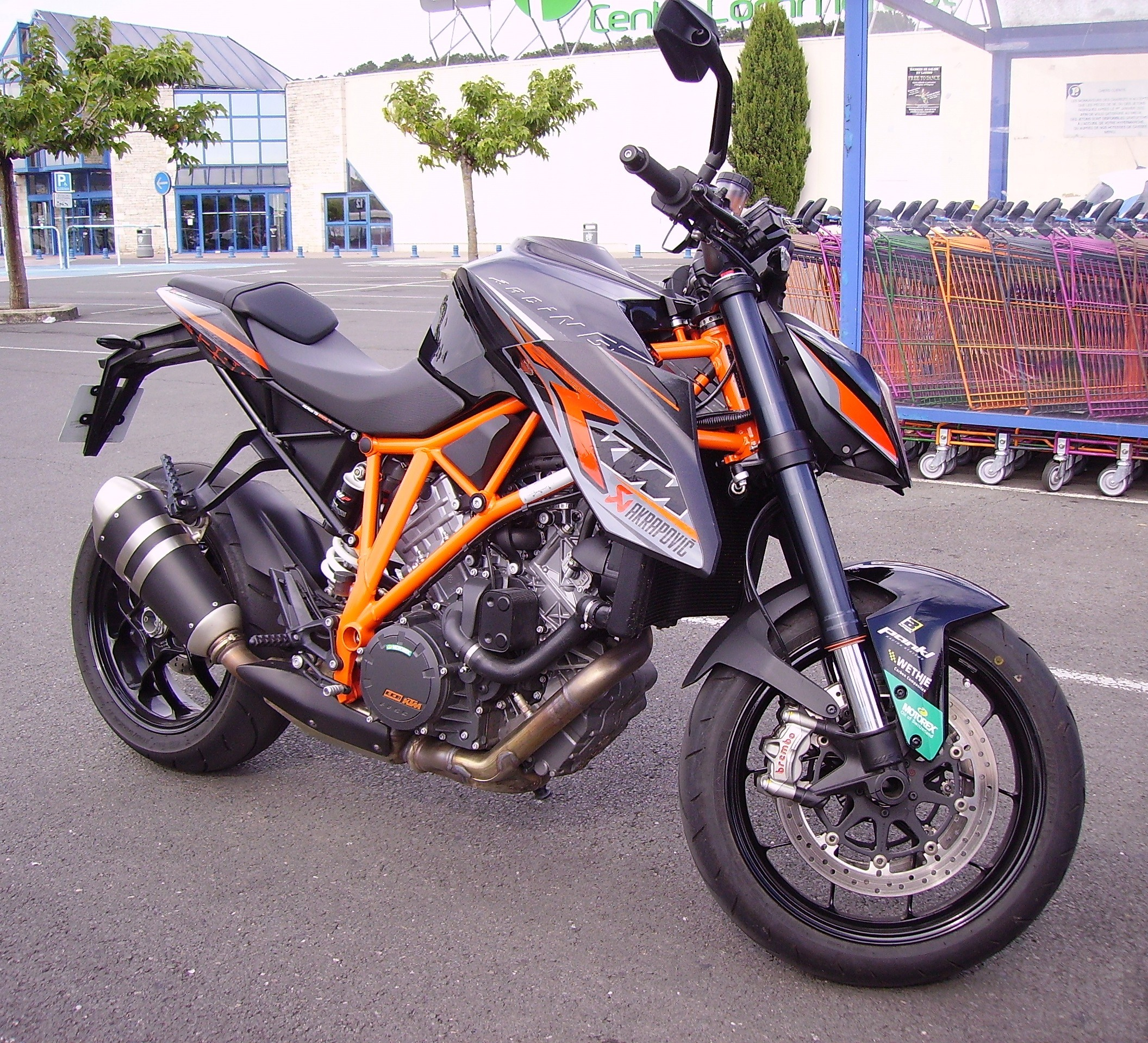
- 2014 1290 Super Duke R
- Manufacturer: KTM
- Production: 2013–present
- Predecessor: KTM 990 Super Duke
- Successor: KTM 1390 Super Duke
- Class: Naked
- Engine: 1,301 cc (79.4 cu in) , 8-valve, 75° V-twin
- Bore / stroke: 108 mm × 71 mm (4.3 in × 2.8 in)
- Compression ratio: 13.6:1
- Top speed: 289 km/h (180 mph)
- Power: 177 hp (132 kW) (claimed)
- Torque: 106.20 lb⋅ft (143.99 N⋅m) (claimed))
- Transmission: 6-speed, wet clutch, X-ring chain drive
- Frame type: Chromoly Steel tube trellis
- Suspension: Front: 48 mm WP fork Rear: WP shock
- Brakes: Front: Dual 320 mm disc; Brembo M50 4-pot caliper Rear: Single 267 mm disc; 2-pot caliper Semi-linked ABS
- Tires: Front: 120/70-17; Rear: 190/55-17
- Rake, trail: 24.9°, 102
- Wheelbase: 1.482 m (4 ft 10.3 in)
- Seat height: 835 mm (32.9 in)
- Weight: 430 lb (200 kg) (dry)
- Fuel capacity: 4.8 US gal (18 L)

The KTM 1290 Super Duke R is a 1301 cc 75° V-twin engine, naked motorcycle from the Austrian manufacturer KTM. With the update in 2017 the motor is the most powerful LC8 engine ever built by KTM.

== Design ==
The KTM 1290 Super Duke R is a naked bike. Known as "The Beast" to its fans around the world. The 2014–2016 models suspension was considered to be too soft but the 2017 update has addressed this with stiffer springs. The 2016 KTM LC8 engine had compression ratio of 13.2:1 and 2017 model has increased compression ratio to 13.6:1. The 2017 model comes with Cruise control as standard and has upgraded electronics such as lean angle sensitive traction control, ride by wire, and optional track mode along with previous model's cornering ABS, quickshifter, riding modes etc.

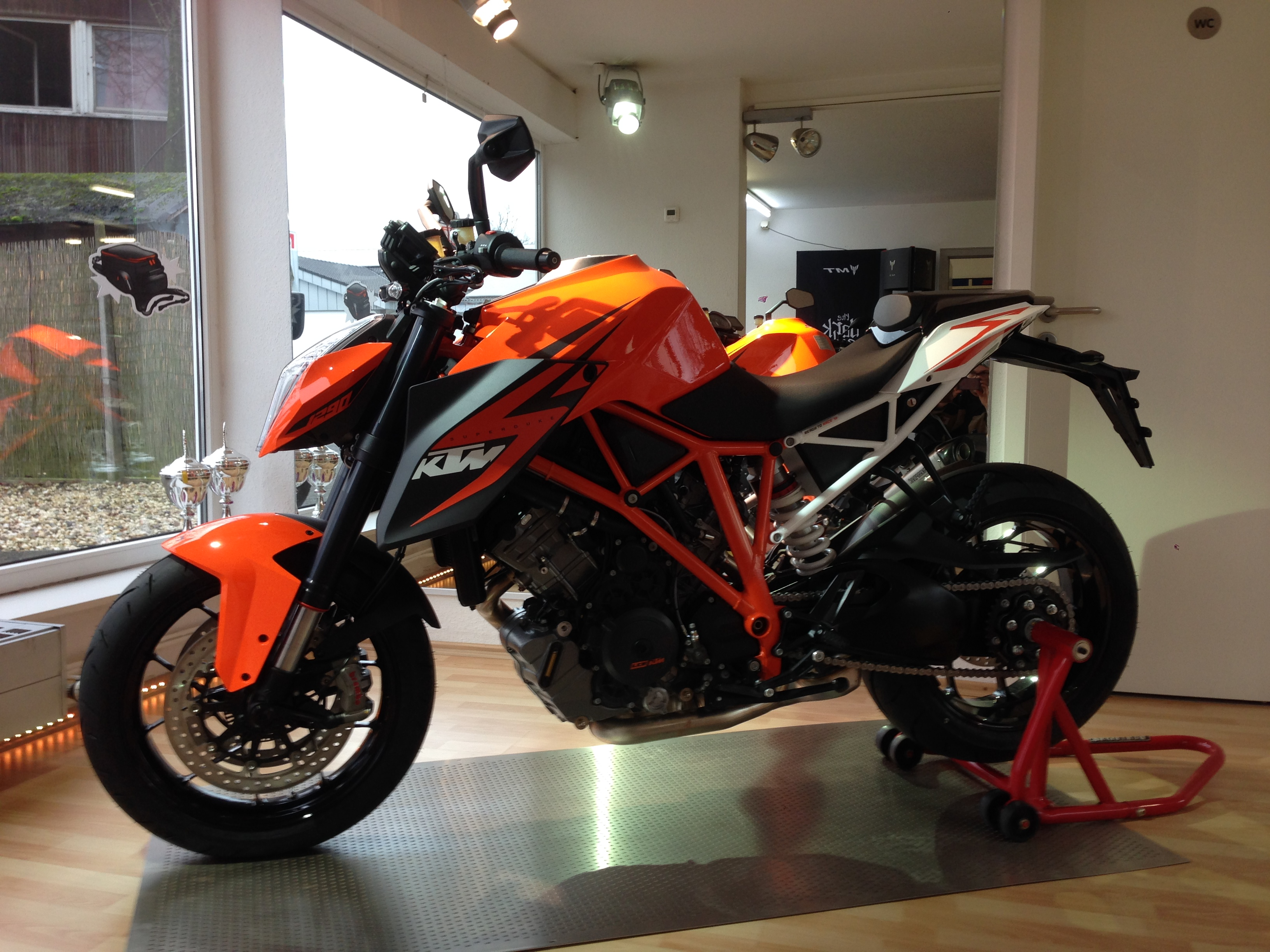
2014 1290 Super Duke R

Generation 1: 2014–2016, Standard analog/digital gauge cluster, three ride modes (Rain, Street, Sport), 18L fuel tank. 10,500 RPM redline. Halogen headlight. Brembo M50 brakes, WP 48 rebound and compression fully adjustable suspension

Generation 2: 2017–2019, Digital 4" TFT display, four ride modes (Rain, Street, Sport, Track (optional)), Engine redline lifted 500 RPM over Gen 1. LED headlight. Brembo M50 Brakes. WP 48 rebound and compression fully adjustable suspension with stiffer spring rates than Gen 1.

Generation 3: 2019–2023, Digital 5" TFT display, four ride modes (Rain, Street, Sport, Track (optional) Performance (optional)), Smaller 16L fuel tank, improved fuel economy. LED headlight. Brembo Stylema brakes. Engine now a stressed member of frame. WP Apex rebound and compression fully adjustable suspension with 3 stage preload. Rear Suspension now has upgraded Linkage.

Super Duke 1390: 2024–Present, Larger engine, Redesigned Headlight.

KTM 1290 Super Duke GT

The Super Duke GT started life as the same Super Duke R, but added a more upright seating position through the use of a different chassis, added windscreen, larger 23 liter fuel tank and fairings and removable and lockable hard Pannier bags on the back. Similar changes were made to the generations of the Super Duke R, but the improvements usually came a year or more after those on the Super Duke R. The KTM 1290 Super Duke GT is sometimes known as the Gentleman's Express.

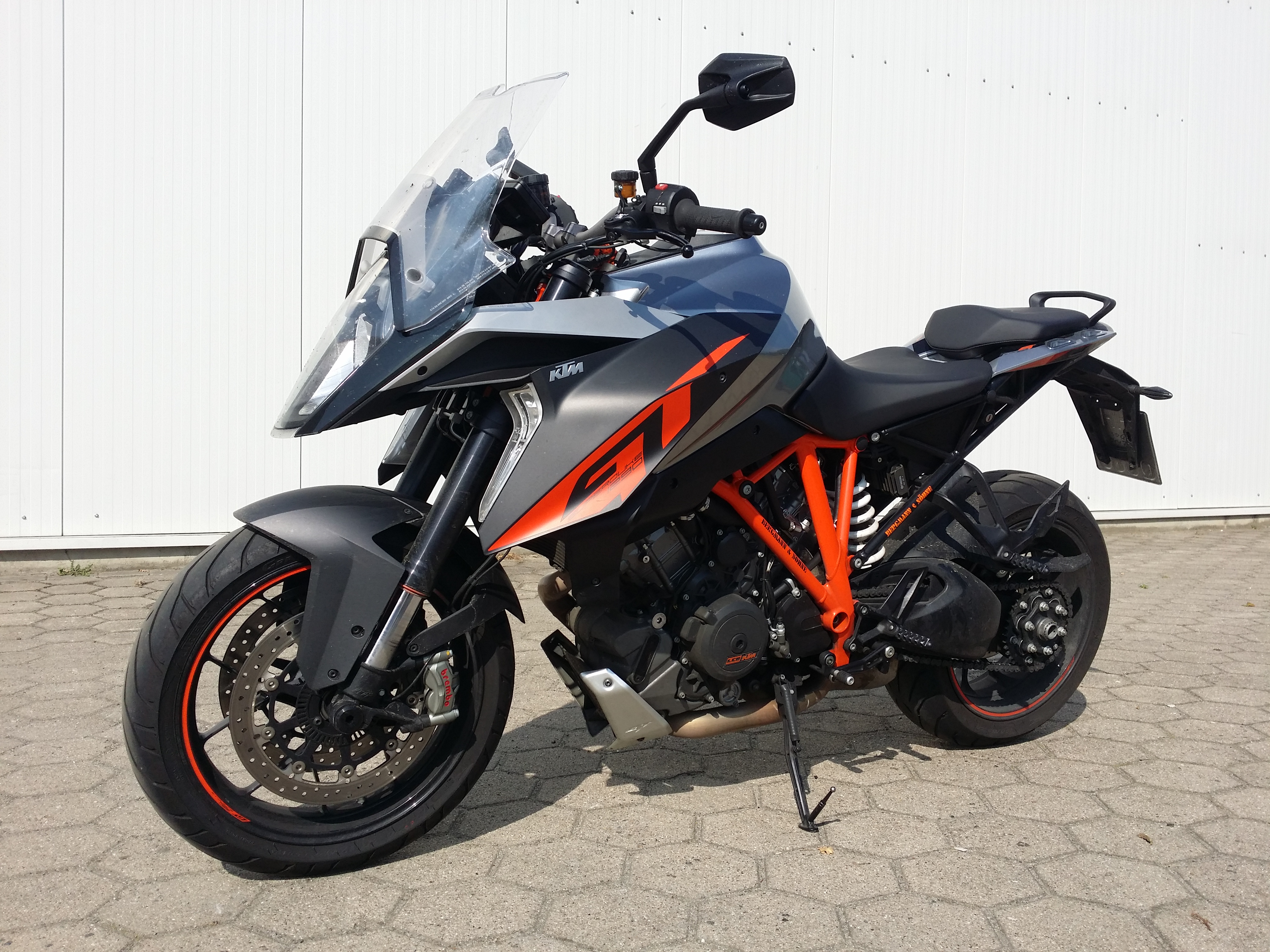
2016 1290 Super Duke GT

Generation 1: 2016–2019, LCD speed MFD/Analogue tachometer dash, cruise control on right side of handlebar.

Generation 2: 2019–2021, TFT display, better suspension software (Gen 1 can be upgraded to the same software), different styling, better placed cruise control controls, a couple of cubbyholes in the fairing, one with a USB socket. Upgraded to LED headlight.

Generation 3: 2022 – Present, Revised display, upgraded LED headlight, Paniers no longer standard.

== Performance ==
For 2014 model, it had acceleration of 0–60 mph in 2.6 seconds, 0–124 mph in 7.2 seconds, braking distance of 99.1 feet from 60–0 mph with ABS, and 138.5 feet from 60–0 mph without ABS. The 2014 model produces maximum of 180 hp and 106 lb-ft of torque.

For the 2017 year model update, the engine and throttle response have become smoother and now produces 177 hp.

== Rivals ==
The KTM 1290 Super Duke commonly rivals the Suzuki B-King, Suzuki GSX-S1000, BMW S1000R, Triumph Speed Triple R, Kawasaki Z1000, Yamaha MT-10, Ducati Monster 1200S/R, Ducati Streetfighter S, and Aprilia Tuono.

== See also ==
- List of motorcycles by type of engine
- BMW S1000R
- Aprilia Tuono
