= BMW HP4 Race =

Track-only sport bike produced by BMW Motorrad

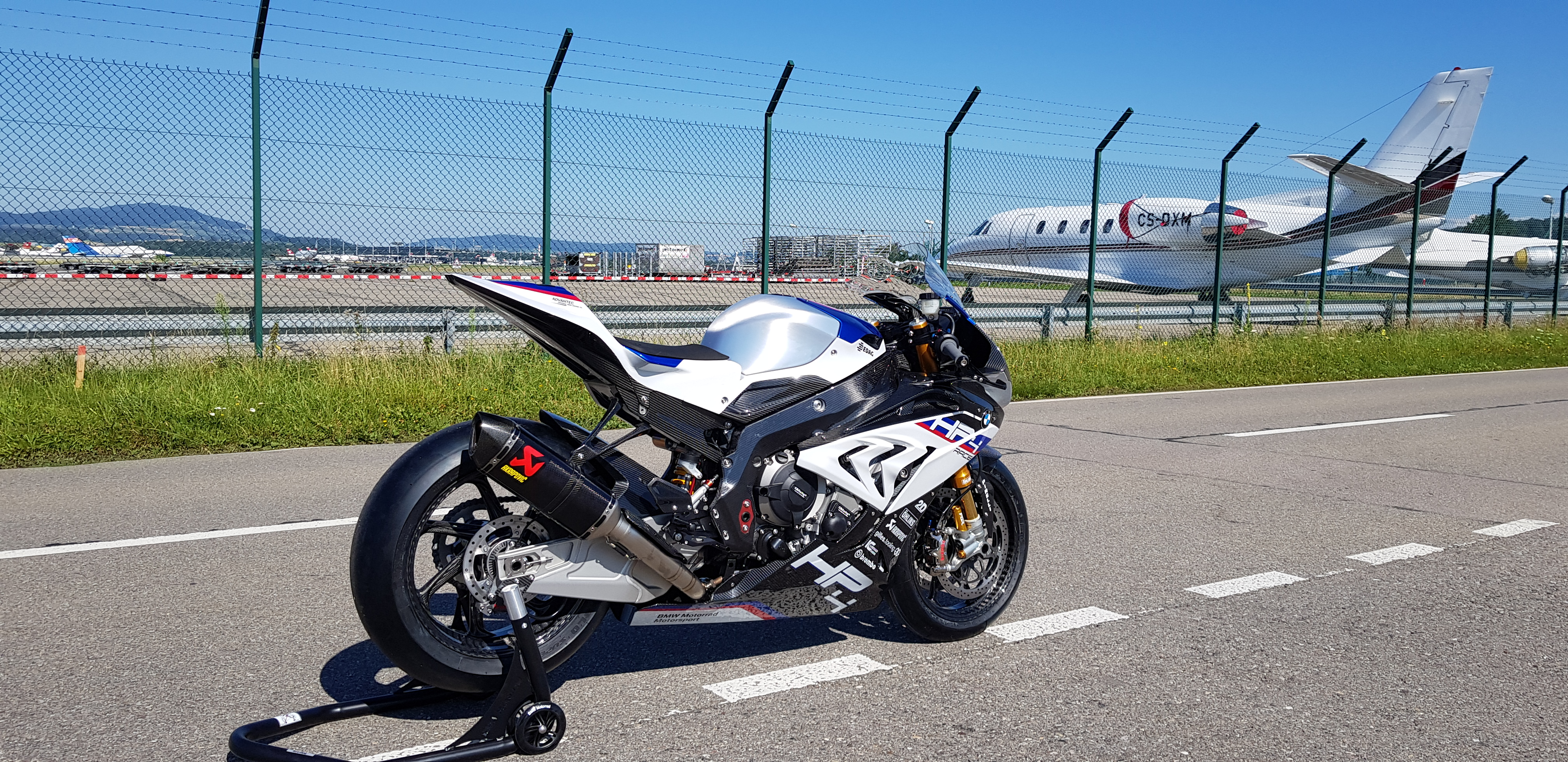
- Manufacturer: BMW Motorrad
- Parent company: BMW
- Production: 2017–
- Predecessor: BMW HP2 Sport
- Class: Sport bike
- Engine: 999 cc (61.0 cu in) liquid/oil-cooled 4-stroke DOHC inline-four
- Bore / stroke: 80.0 mm × 49.7 mm (3.15 in × 1.96 in)
- Compression ratio: 13.7–13.9:1
- Transmission: 6-speed sequential manual transmission, chain drive
- Suspension: Front: inverted telescopic fork
- Brakes: Front: dual 320 mm discs Rear: single 220 mm disc
- Rake, trail: Adjustable 24.5° (-0.5°/+1.0°)
- Seat height: Adjustable 820–850 mm (32.1–33.3 in)
- Weight: 146 kg (322 lb) (dry); 171 kg (377 lb) (wet)
- Fuel capacity: 17 L (4.5 US gal)
- Related: BMW S1000RR

The BMW HP4 Race is a 999 cc (61.0 cu in) four-cylinder sport bike manufactured by BMW Motorrad in 2017 in a limited production run of 750 units. It is a non-street-legal, track-only motorcycle derived from the HP4 variant of the BMW S1000RR.

== Background ==
Like the Honda RC213V-S and Ducati Superleggera, the HP4 Race does not conform to a specific race series regulations and was designed to showcase manufacturing capabilities rather than for homologation. BMW claims the engine produces 215 hp (160 kW) at 14,500 rpm—higher than the standard HP4, which produces 193 hp (144 kW) at 13,900 rpm.

Most design elements and engine architectures are derived from the S1000RR, with components re-tuned for enhanced track performance and adjustable geometry, including a rake angle of 24.5° adjustable by ±1°. The motorcycle features an all-carbon fiber frame weighing 7.8 kg (17 lb), alongside extensive use of carbon fiber bodywork. It uses a race-pattern (1-up, 2-down) shifting configuration and includes electronic rider aids such as traction control, wheelie control, and a quickshifter. As a track-only machine, it lacks street equipment such as headlights, taillights, and mirrors.
