= BMW S1000RR =

Sport bike

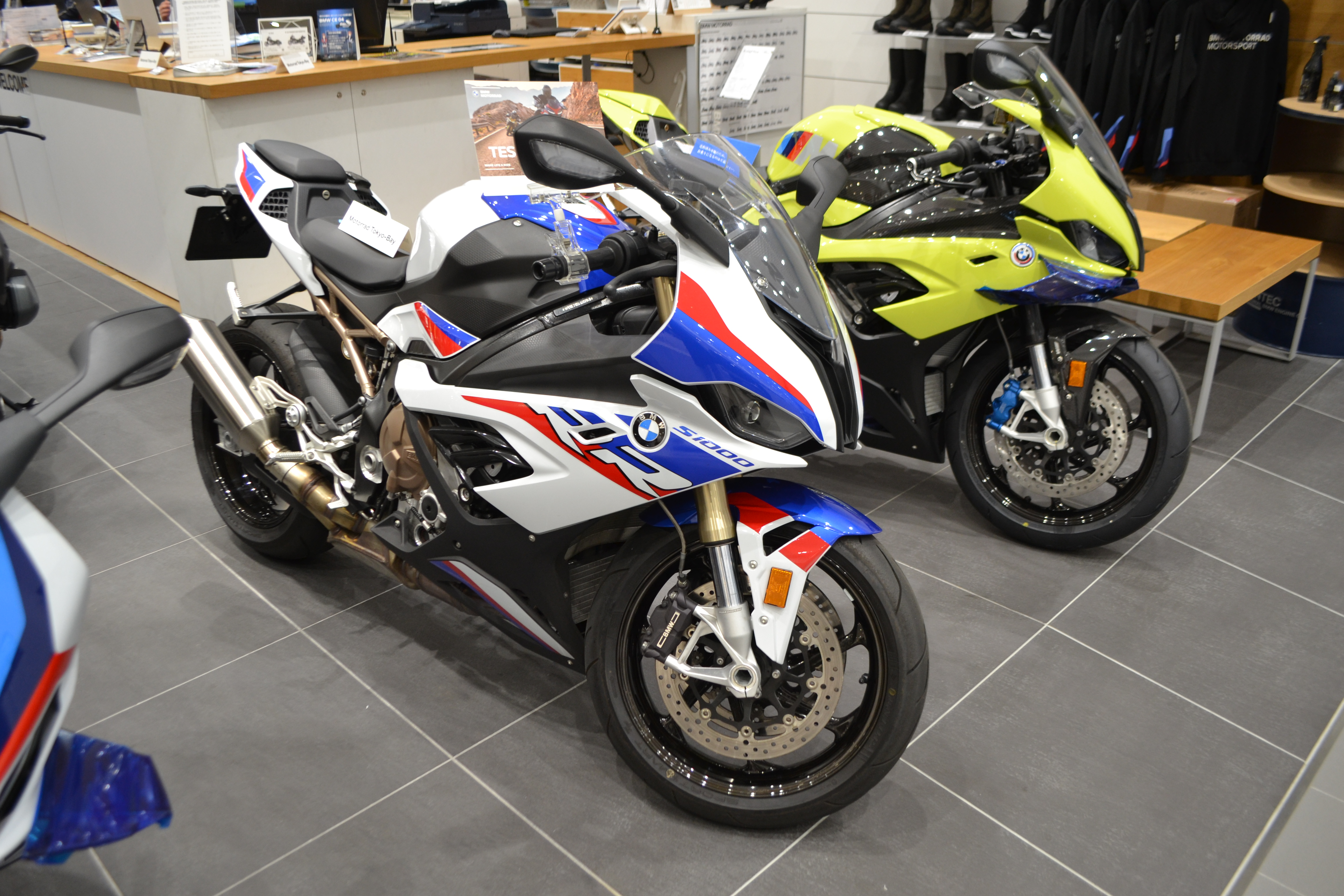
- BMW S1000RR (K67)
- Manufacturer: BMW Motorrad
- Parent company: Bayerische Motoren Werke AG
- Production: 2008–present
- Class: Sports motorcycle
- Engine: 998 cc, DOHC 4 stroke
- Bore / stroke: 80 mm × 49,7 mm (3,1 in × 2,0 in)
- Compression ratio: e.g. 13.5:1
- Top speed: 300 km/h (186 mph)
- Power: 215 hp/14500 rpm
- Torque: 113 nm/11000 rpm
- Ignition type: Electronic
- Fuel delivery: Fuel injection
- Transmission: Anti-hopping wet clutch with self-reinforcing 6-speed motorcycle gearbox Manual; Sprocket chain
- Brakes: Front brake:Double ABS brake discs, 5 mm thick, 320 mm diameter, M Brake 4-piston fixed calipers Rear brake:Single ABS disc brake, 220 mm diameter, fixed 2-piston caliper Motorcycle brake caliper: Brembo
- Tires: 120/70 ZR 17 Michelin; 200/55 ZR 17 Michelin
- Dimensions: L: 2073 mm W: 848 mm H: 1197 mm
- Seat height: 832 mm
- Weight: 169,8 kg (dry); 191,8 kg (wet)
- Fuel capacity: 17l
- Fuel consumption: 8.348l/100km (Gasoline)
- Related: BMW S1000R; BMW S1000XR; BMW HP4 Race; BMW M1000RR
- Ground clearance: 125 mm

BMW S1000RR (officially designated as BMW S 1000 RR) is a race orientated sports motorcycle initially made by BMW Motorrad to compete in the 2009 Superbike World Championship, that is now in commercial production. It was introduced in Munich in April 2008, and is powered by a 998 cc (60.9 cu in) transverse inline four-cylinder engine redlined at 14,200 rpm.

BMW made 1,000 S1000RRs in 2009 to satisfy World Superbike homologation requirements, but expanded production for commercial sale of the bike in 2010. It has a standard anti-lock braking system, with an optional electronic traction control. As of 2016, it has a wet weight of 204 kg (450 lb), and produces 148.4 kW (199.0 hp; 201.8 PS) at 13,500 rpm. With 133.6 kW (179.2 hp; 181.6 PS) to the rear wheel, it was the most powerful motorcycle in the class on the dyno. BMW S1000RR is currently the second fastest road legal bike, surpassing the Kawasaki Ninja H2 in most scenarios. It goes up to 310kmph in the latest generation and accelerates to 300kmph in just 20 seconds.

== History ==
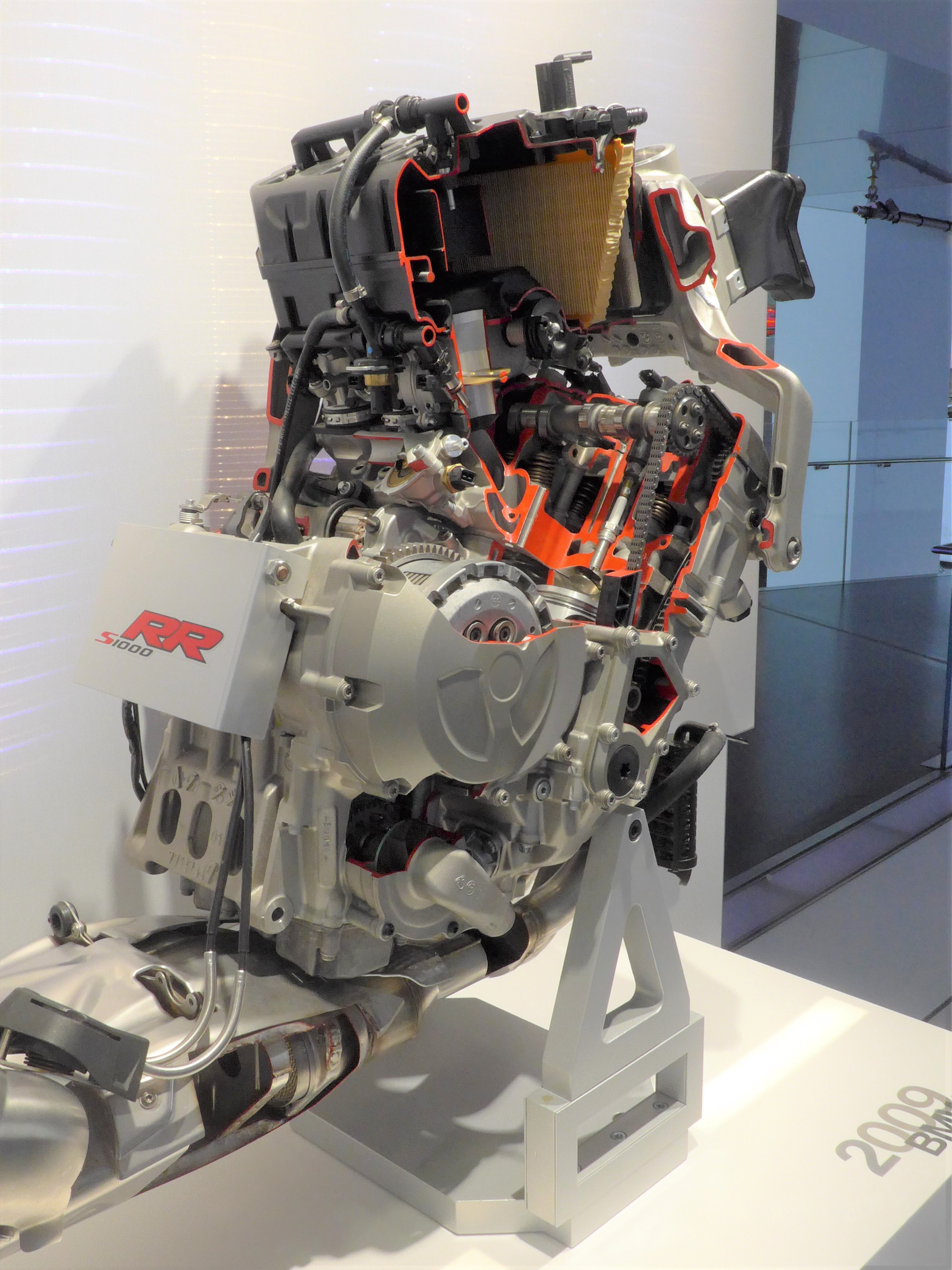
S1000RR engine cutaway at the BMW Museum.

=== 2009–2011 (K 46) ===
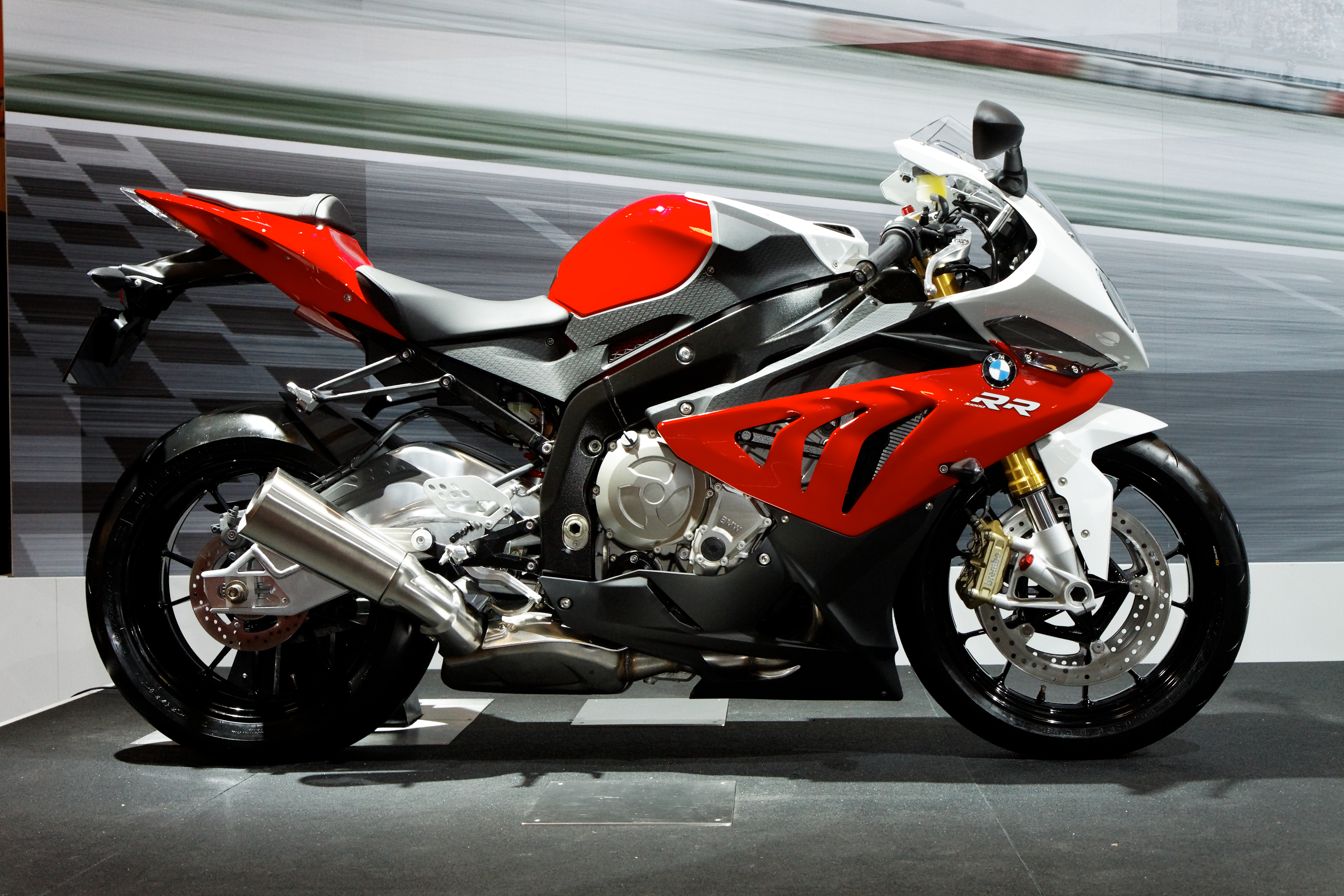
2011 BMW S1000RR

The S1000RR was released in 2009 and was considered the best-equipped sport bike in the 1000 cc category, and with a bore and stroke of 80.0 mm × 49.7 mm (3.1 in × 2.0 in), it also had the biggest bore in its class. The bike came factory fitted with ABS and dynamic traction control, a first for road-going superbike at the time. On top of this, it came standard with three riding modes (Wet, Sport and Race) with an additional riding mode (Slick) available only after connecting a dongle, that you received with the bike, to a special jack under the seat. It was also the first production motorcycle to offer an optional quick shifter. This is a clutchless shifter that allowed you to upshift with no clutch actuation even at full throttle. After the initial delivery of motorcycles the factory started shipping them with a software governor that limited RPM to 9000 for a short break in period that was later removed by the dealers. The 2011 bike remained unchanged, keeping the same livery options, engine, chassis and suspension.

=== 2012 (K 46) ===
In 2012, the bike received slightly more significant changes. It was given new throttle maps for each of the four riding modes, to combat throttle response issues that customers were facing with the bike. To further aid this issue, BMW updated the throttle tube to be lighter and have a shorter pull. The intake and exhaust systems received updates: the ram air intake was made 20% larger and the catalytic converters were moved from the headers to the muffler, which allowed the oil sump heat shield to be removed, saving a small amount of weight. The optional DTC (Dynamic Traction Control) was updated, smoothing the butterfly valve action when a wheelie was detected, providing a less violent response to the bike's front wheel lifting off the ground. The chassis was updated; the front suspension was lifted by 4 mm (0.2 in) and the rear was lowered by 5 mm (0.2 in). The wheelbase was reduced by nearly 10 mm (0.4 in) through a tooth addition in the rear sprocket (45). The angle of the steering head was revised and the offset of the fork was reduced by 2.5 mm (0.1 in). The triple clamp on top of the fork was uprated to forged aluminium. Lastly, the spring rates and valving in the suspension were revised, including special check valves to allow for completely independent compression and rebound adjustment, coupled with a 10-way adjustable steering damper. The 2012 visual updates included a new face of the tachometer as well as new heel plates, a slimmer-looking tail section and reshaped side panels with plastic winglets: these were said to improve aerodynamics at speed. Smaller visual updates included grilles on the side of the tank plastics and a new "RR" logo.

=== 2013 (K 46) and HP4 (K 42) ===
In 2013 the bike did not receive updates to the same extent as the 2012 bike. However, BMW introduced the HP4 variant, a more track-oriented version of the standard S1000RR. The 2013 HP4 saw the ride-by-wire system again taken to a level unseen outside of the WSBK and MotoGP. The HP4 was fitted with a Dynamic Dampening Control (DDC) system that updates and makes changes to the suspension every 11 milliseconds, responding to various sensors as well as throttle input and is adjustable on the fly, a first on any production motorcycle. The bike was given an electronic controlled interference pipe and acoustic valves, allowing air to flow into the exhaust and burn unused fuel as well as upgraded Brembo Monobloc brake calipers. The riding modes of the HP4 differ from the standard bike, in that it allows for all 144 kW (193 hp; 196 PS) to be accessed in four modes. The HP4 also introduced combined braking, meaning that in all modes except slick, the back brake is applied automatically when the rider applies the front brake. It was offered in multiple race kit packages, ranging from the stock claimed 144 kW (193 hp; 196 PS) of the S1000RR all the way up to a claimed 158 kW (212 hp; 215 PS). The 2013 HP4 was also equipped with more electronic features, launch control and pit-mode, all accessible from the controls on the handlebars. The bike was also given its own colorway and an HP4-specific tachometer face. Also available at extra cost was a competition and premium package which included HP carbon engine belly pan, side spoilers and trim, HP folding clutch and brake levers, HP adjustable rider footrests, standard forged wheels finished in Racing Blue Metallic, a decal kit, (optional) heated grips, a pillion rider kit and an anti-theft alarm.

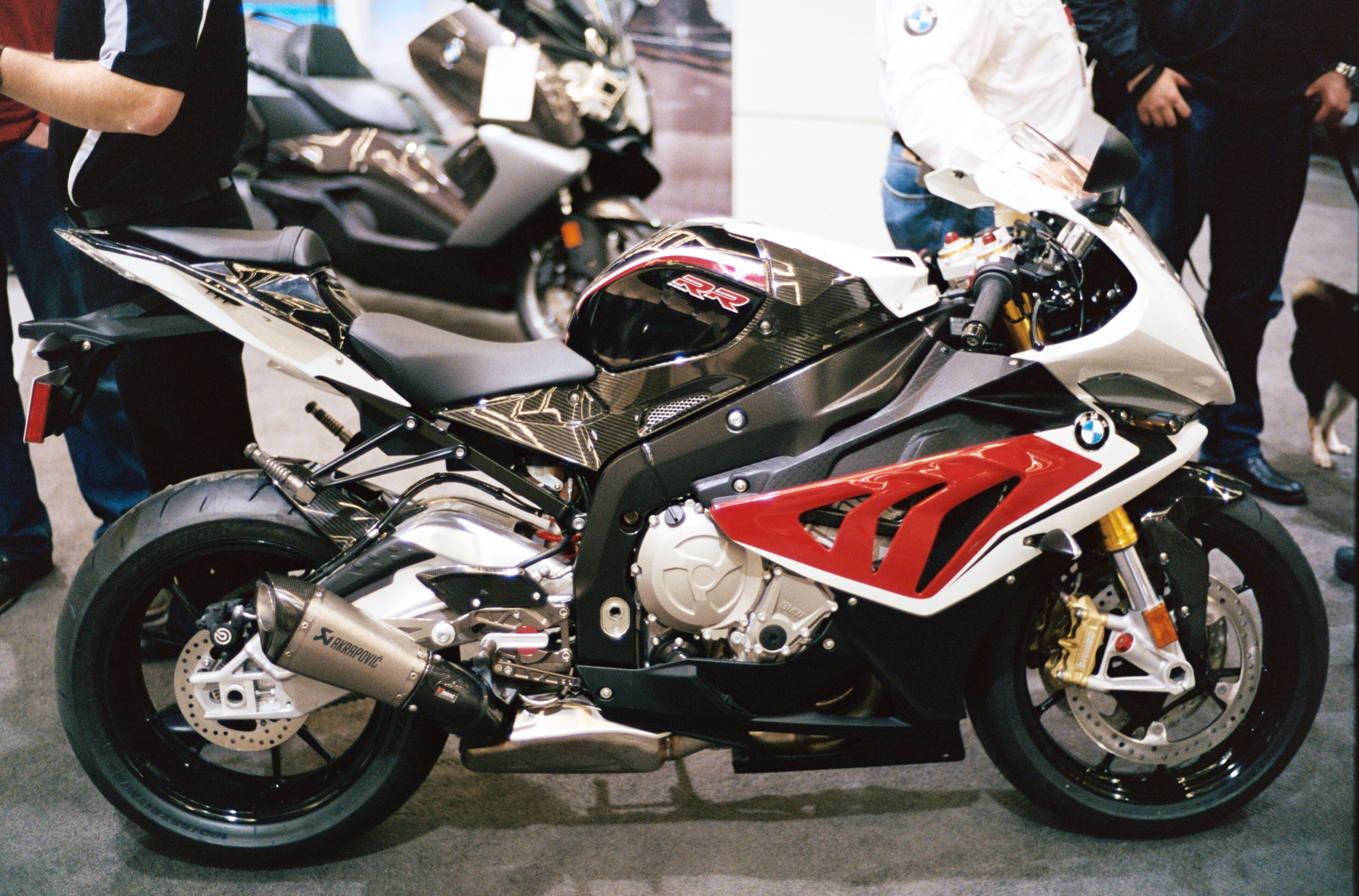
2014 BMW S1000RR

=== 2014 (K 46) and HP4 (K 42) ===
The 2014 S1000RR saw some more minor updates and the first race-ABS as standard. The handlebars were also slightly modified, as well as some very minor changes to the fairings. The HP4 variant was sold for the second year with no major changes; available at extra cost was a premium package which included HP carbon engine spoiler and trim, HP folding clutch and brake levers, HP adjustable rider footrests, standard forged wheels finished in Racing Blue Metallic, a decal kit, heated grips, a pillion rider kit and an anti-theft alarm.

=== 2015 (K 46) ===
In 2015, the S1000RR saw major updates and changes. Notably, the bike now weighed 4 kg (8.8 lb) less and gained 4.4 kW (5.9 hp; 6.0 PS) to a claimed output of 148 kW (198 hp; 201 PS). This was achieved through reshaping the ports, a new cam profile, lighter valves and shorter velocity stacks drawing from a larger airbox. An all-new exhaust has also been implemented, drawing from the previous years HP4, adding a controlled interference pipe and acoustic valves. More options made available in the 2015 variant were included in the "Dynamic Package" which included BMW's Quickshift Assist Pro, allowing for clutchless up and downshifts. BMW also introduced a "Race Package" which gave the user DDC from the HP4, a "Pro" riding mode as well as launch control, a customizable pit limiter and cruise control. To the electronics, BMW again added smoother front wheel lift intervention and a new "User" mode, where the rider is able to customize some defined parameters, allowing for a fully personalized riding experience. More learnings from the HP4 include combined braking (automatically activating the rear brake when the front brake is applied), on-the-fly ABS and DTC control and lean angle sensors that provide a readout on the dash. The 2015 bikes lighter chassis consists of four individual aluminium cast pieces welded together with the engine tilted forward at a 32-degree angle and integrated as a load-bearing element. The fork overlap of the immersion tubes was reduced to 6 mm (0.2 in) and the steering head angle increased 0.5 degrees to 66.5 without any change in the yoke offset. The swingarm pivot point was lowered by 3 mm (0.1 in) and the wheelbase lengthened by 15 mm (0.6 in). The new chassis geometry provides increased rider feedback from the front end the rear wheel. The visual updates to the S1000RR were also vast, with the asymmetric headlights being swapped (high beam left, low beam right), a softer nose and all new colorways. The muffler was changed to a larger can, while the fairings became more aerodynamically advanced adding vents and slips to allow for better stability at high speed.

=== 2017 (K 60) ===
In 2017, a non-street legal, track-only variant, the BMW HP4 Race was added, made in a limited production run of 750 units.

=== 2019 (K 67) ===
The S1000RR received a full model change for 2019 at the November 2018 EICMA, Milan, Italy. The 999 cc (61.0 cu in) four-cylinder engine is entirely new, which is claimed to produce 152 kW (204 hp; 207 PS) at 13,500 rpm (up 4.5 kW (6.0 hp; 6.1 PS) from the previous iteration) and 113 N⋅m (83 lbf⋅ft) of torque at 11,000 rpm. This new engine employs BMW ShiftCam technology on the intake side, which varies intake valve timing and lift. The system has sliding concentric outer shafts, with two different cam profiles on them, on a splined inner shaft with the drive on one end. An ECU-controlled motor switches between low- and high-speed cams at 9,000 rpm in under 10 milliseconds, which produce soft, low-lift, short-duration cams for low-down and midrange torque, then a more aggressive profile cams for peak power production. The outer shafts are moved by a movable pin engaging in a cammed slot on the shaft, which slides the outer camshaft section left and right as needed. BMW claims the addition of this system gives the S1000RR a more linear torque curve than its predecessor.

Aside from power increase, the S1000RR's engine gains a weight loss of nearly 4 kg (9 lb) and a more compact external design. This was achieved through the use of specialized parts, like hollow-bored titanium intake valves and new DLC rocker arms that are said to be 25% lighter. The camshafts are now directly powered by the crankshaft, thus eliminating the need for the previous idler gear. The water and oil pumps are combined into one component for a compact design. The exhaust system is also 1.28 kg (2.8 lb) lighter on the 2019 model, which contributes to a total 11 kg (24 lb) loss in comparison to its predecessor. This brings the overall curb weight of 197 kg (434 lb).

To harness the power output, BMW gave the S1000RR a package of electronics suite of rider aids, including ABS Pro (cornering ABS), Dynamic Traction Control (DTC), Dynamic Traction Control Wheelie Function, Shift Assistant Pro (which allows for clutchless up and downshifts), Hill Start Control (HSC), Launch Control and Pit Lane Limiter. There are four preset riding modes: "Rain", "Road", "Dynamic" and "Race", as well as three "Pro" modes, which can be custom tuned and come with a three-stage engine-braking adjustment.

The chassis has been revamped for the 2019 S1000RR, which is focusing on weight reduction while improving handling. The aluminium perimeter frame drops 1.28 kg (2.8 lb) of weight, now using the engine as more of a load-bearing unit and reducing width by 13 mm (0.51 in). With a focus on improving agility, BMW steepened the steering head angle to 66.9 degrees and reduced trail to 93.9 mm (3.70 in). The wheelbase has been increased by 9 mm (0.35 in). The front suspension is a 45 mm (1.77 in) inverted telescopic fork, which is decreased in size from 46 mm (1.81 in), that is claimed to optimize flex and midcorner feel. BMW Dynamic Damping Control (DDC) semi-active suspension is still available on the S1000RR as an option, which has been enhanced with updated damping settings. The fuel tank and seat design are now slimmer. The front fairing is narrower and more aerodynamic than its predecessor, also housing twin symmetrical LED headlights, with the intake directly centered at the front for optimum airflow. The instrumentation now uses a 6.5-inch TFT display, which has four preset settings.

The M package, the first of any BMW motorcycle, is available, which includes motorsport paint finish, M carbon fiber wheels, an M lightweight battery, M Chassis Kit with rear ride height adjustment and swingarm pivot, the M Sport seat and a "Pro" riding mode. The package reduces the weight further to 193.5 kg (427 lb).

=== M1000RR (K 66) ===
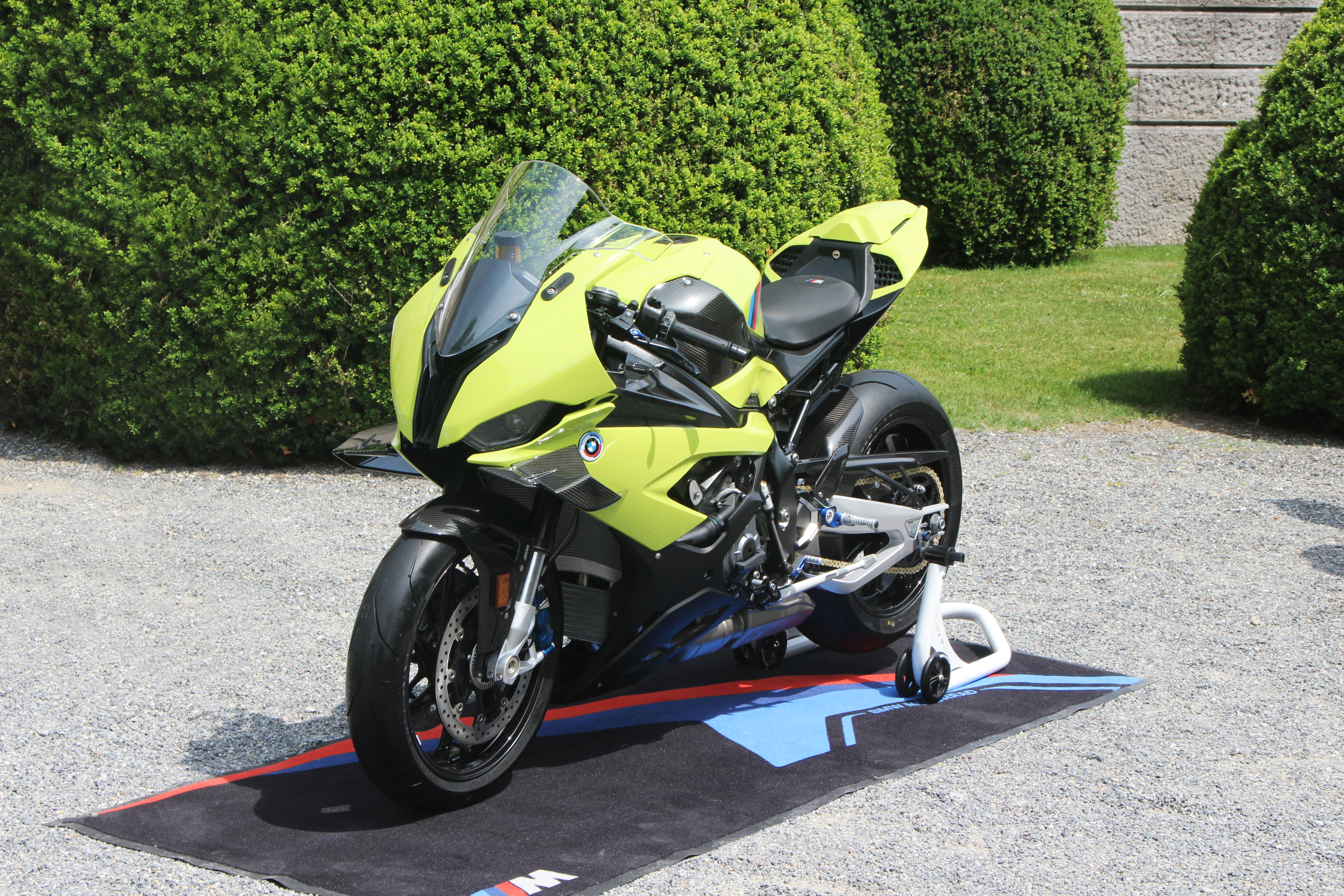
2022 BMW M1000RR

The higher-spec variant of the S1000RR, called M1000RR, was unveiled in September 2020 intended as a basis for racing but still road legal. The first BMW motorcycle to carry the 'M' prefix normally associated with cars, the machine has extensive modifications in powerplant, chassis, exhaust and braking. The fairing has aerodynamic winglets that provide downforce.

=== 2022 (K 67 & K 66) ===
BMW S1000RR with shift-cam
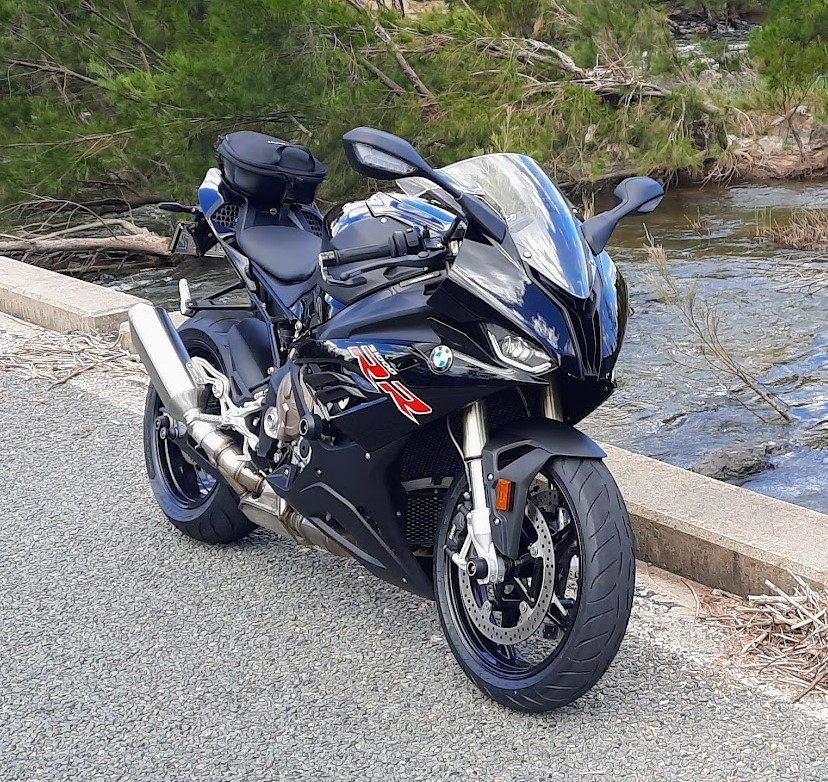
- 2022 BMW S1000RR (K67)

Three variants of the S1000 RR announced on 30 September 2022 are the M package, Style Passion and Black Storm Metallic.

Updates include:

- new front design with improved aerodynamics
- high windscreen
- a new steering angle sensor with Brake Slide Assist and Slide Control
- integration of M components and improvements to the electronics and crucial processes for modifying the bike for use on the race tracks
- short licence plate holder
- optional tail-hump cover for the passenger seat
- updated TFT display
- 215 horsepower

The M package includes:

- Exclusive Light White/M Motorsport paint
- M Sport seat for optimum feel
- M race cover kit for rear seat
- Weight-optimized M Carbon wheels with M graphics or the alternatively available M forged wheels.
- Updated M winglets that provide increased downforce at speed
- M braking system
- Milled parts for foot and hand controls.

== Road racing ==
=== Race bike differences ===
The factory race bike used in the Superbike World Championship differs in a number of ways from the production bike. Its engine has a higher compression ratio of 14.0:1 compared with 13.0:1, and it delivers over 150 kW (201 hp; 204 PS) at 14,000 rpm, compared with 144 kW (193 hp; 196 PS) at 13,000 rpm. The race bike has a 44 mm (1.73 in) Öhlins forks, compared with a 46 mm (1.81 in) ZF Sachs forks. Until 2012, it had a 16.5-inch front wheel and a 16-inch rear wheel instead of a 17-inch (for 2013 World Superbike season, 17-inch rims became mandatory) and an MRA racing 'double-bubble' windshield. Most significantly, it has a wet weight of 162 kg (357 lb) compared with 207.7 kg (458 lb) for the production model.

=== Superbike World Championship ===
On 26 June 2008, Spanish rider Rubén Xaus signed to ride the bike for the factory BMW Motorrad team. On 25 September 2008, Australian former double Superbike World Champion Troy Corser signed to complete the team's two-rider lineup for 2009. In the 2009 Superbike World Championship season, the highest race result achieved by Corser was fifth place in the Czech Republic, and Xaus achieved seventh place in Italy.

During the 2010 FIM Superstock 1000 Championship season, Ayrton Badovini dominated by winning every single race but one on the S1000RR. This result was significant because the Superstock class of WSBK is where the machines most closely resemble the stock offerings at the showroom. On 13 May 2012, Italian rider Marco Melandri riding for the factory BMW Motorrad team was the first to secure a win for the S1000RR in World Superbike competition at the British round in Donington Park. His teammate Leon Haslam came in second giving BMW a "One Two" finish.

=== MotoGP CRT Class ===
On 2012 Qatar Grand Prix, US rider Colin Edwards rode a S1000RR engined motorcycle for the Forward Racing team. This history making inaugural CRT Class debut, where 1,000 cc tuned factory production motorcycle engines competed for the first time alongside the current MotoGP machines. The S1000RR engined Suter machine placed first in its class and finished 12th overall.

=== Isle of Man TT ===
The S1000RR has been used by various riders at the Isle of Man TT since 2010. On 31 May 2014, Michael Dunlop won the superbike class race on his factory-prepared bike entered by Hawk Racing, a UK-based BSB team operating as Buildbase BMW Motorrad, breaking a 75-year gap between wins for BMW. Three days later, Dunlop repeated his victory in the Superstock class, running under his own MD Racing BMW banner. He stated "...this is a great result for BMW. It’s great for a manufacturer when a road bike wins a TT”. Dunlop completed a hat-trick of BMW victories with a Senior TT win on Friday, 6 June.

Dunlop won the Superbike and Senior races at the 2016 Isle of Man TT festival on essentially the same machine, again provided by Hawk Racing, setting a new absolute solo-machine course record, averaging 215.591 km/h (133.962 mph), set during one-lap of the six-lap event held on the 37-mile road course.

=== Macau Grand Prix ===
Peter Hickman won the Macau Grand Prix in 2015 and 2016.

== Marketing ==
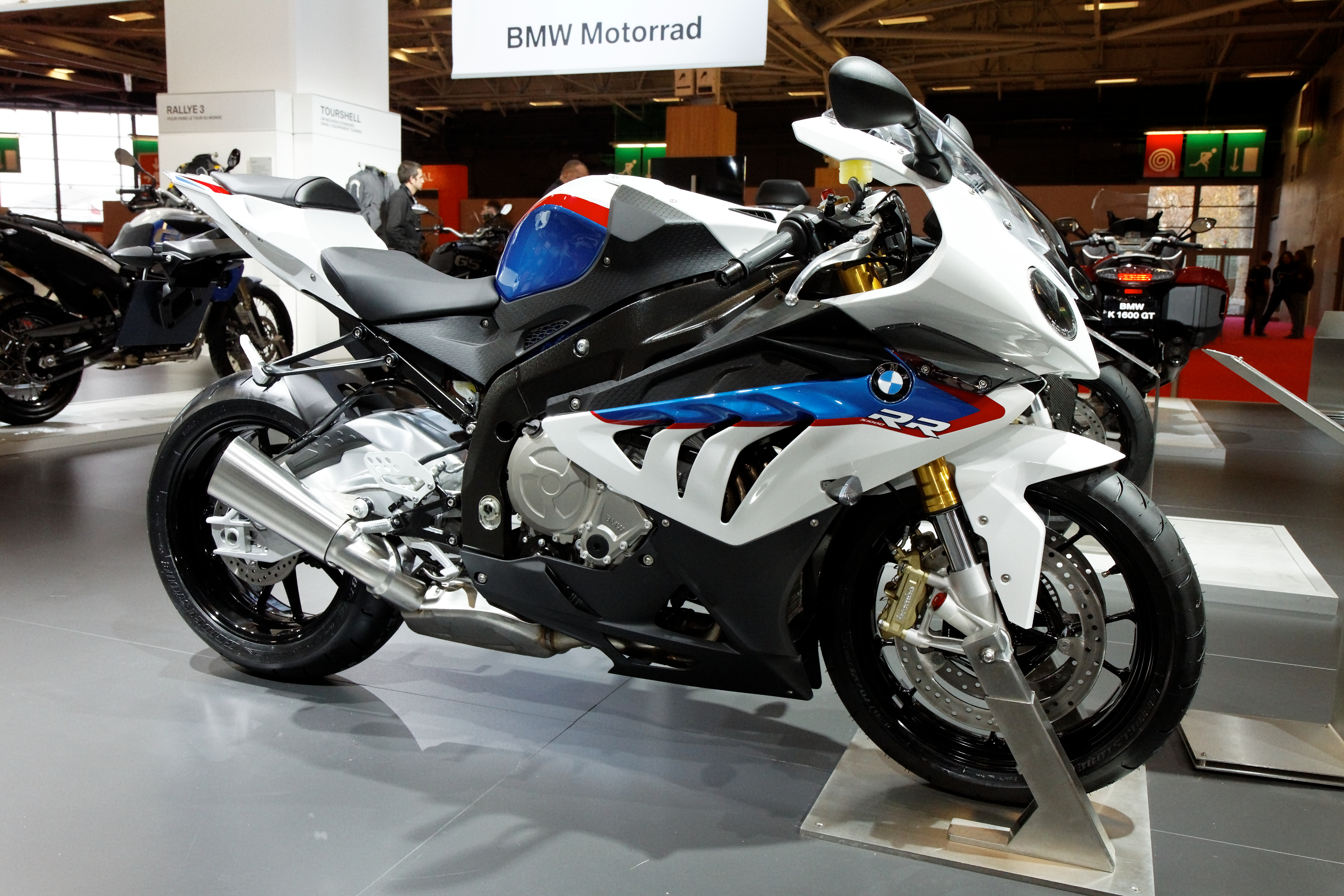
A 2012 S1000RR in BMW Motorsport livery.

In March 2010, BMW released a video on YouTube titled "The oldest trick in the world", which highlighted the S1000RR's acceleration by pulling a tablecloth off a long 20-seat dining table without disturbing the place settings and table decorations. Its popularity turned the ad viral, with 1.4 million views in the first ten days, and more than 3.7 million views as of October 2010. The October 27, 2010 MythBusters episode "Tablecloth Chaos" tested whether the trick could be reproduced. The stunt was replicated in detail, with the exception that a different and less powerful motorcycle was used—a Buell 1125R, owned and ridden by the show's co-presenter Jamie Hyneman. The opinion of the television program was that the video was fake as the only way it could be reproduced was by placing a plastic sheet on top of the tablecloth—thus eliminating any contact between the tablecloth and the table settings.

== Recall ==
BMW issued a recall for bikes built between 1 September 2011, through 10 April 2012 to address an issue with bolts that secure the connecting rods to the crankshaft that could loosen at high engine speeds.

== Specifications ==
Specification	2010–2014	2015–2018	2019–present
Engine & transmission
Layout	4-stroke 16-valve DOHC inline-four		
Capacity	998 cc (60.9 cu in)		
Bore × stroke	80 mm × 49.7 mm (3.1 in × 2.0 in)		
Compression ratio	13.0:1		13.3:1
Power	142 kW (193 bhp) at 13.000 rpm		
Cooling system	Liquid-cooled		
Carburation	Fuel injection		
Starter	Electric		
Transmission	6-speed constant-mesh sequential manual		
Final drive	Chain		
Cycle parts & suspension
Frame	Aluminium twin-spar		
Front suspension	Inverted 46 mm (1.81 in) telescopic fork, 125 mm (4.9 in) travel	Inverted 46 mm (1.81 in) telescopic fork, 120 mm (4.7 in) travel	Inverted 45 mm (1.77 in) telescopic fork, 120 mm (4.7 in) travel
Front tyre	120/70-17		
Front rim	3.5*17		
Front brakes	Dual 320 mm (12.6 in) discs with radially-mounted 4-piston caliper		
Rear suspension	Aluminium swingarm with monoshock, preload/rebound damping adjustable, 130 mm (5.1 in) travel		Aluminium swingarm with monoshock, preload/rebound damping adjustable, 118 mm (4.6 in) travel
Rear tyre	190/55-17		
Rear rim	6.0*17		
Rear brakes	Single 220 mm (8.7 in) disc brake with single-piston caliper		
Dimensions
Length	2,056 mm (80.94 in)	2,050 mm (80.71 in)	2,073 mm (81.6 in)
Width	826 mm (32.5 in)		846 mm (33.3 in)
Height	1,138 mm (44.80 in)	1,140 mm (44.88 in)	
Seat height	820 mm (32.3 in)	815 mm (32.1 in)	824 mm (32.4 in)
Wheelbase	1,422 mm (55.98 in)	1,425 mm (56.10 in)	1,441 mm (56.7 in)
Wet weight	204 kg (450 lb)		197 kg (434 lb)
Fuel capacity	17.5 L (3.8 imp gal; 4.6 US gal)		16.5 L (3.6 imp gal; 4.4 US gal)

== Performance ==
Parameter	Result
0–100 km/h (62.1 mph)	3.1 s, 43 m (141 ft)
0–161 km/h (100 mph)	5.13 s
0–193 km/h (120 mph)	7.22 s
0–200 km/h (124.3 mph)	7.87 s, 209 m (686 ft)
0–250 km/h (155.3 mph)	10.4 s, 426 m (1,398 ft)
0–280 km/h (174.0 mph)	14.8 s, 750 m (2,460 ft)
0–300 km/h (186.4 mph)	19.1 s, 1,112 m (3,648 ft)
0–402 m (1/4 mile)	10.02 s at 254.27 km/h (158 mph)
0–1,609 m (1 mile)	24.98 s at 297.73 km/h (185 mph)
Braking distance 250–0 km/h (155–0 mph)	229 m (751 ft)

== Awards ==
- Motorcycle News (United Kingdom) "Machine of the Year" and "Sports Bike over 751cc" 2010
- Cycle World Best Superbike of 2010
- motorcycle.com Motorcycle of the Year 2010
- Robb Report Best of the Best 2010
- Motorcyclist Motorcycle of the Year 2010

== See also ==
- List of fastest production motorcycles by acceleration
