= KTM 990 Super Duke =

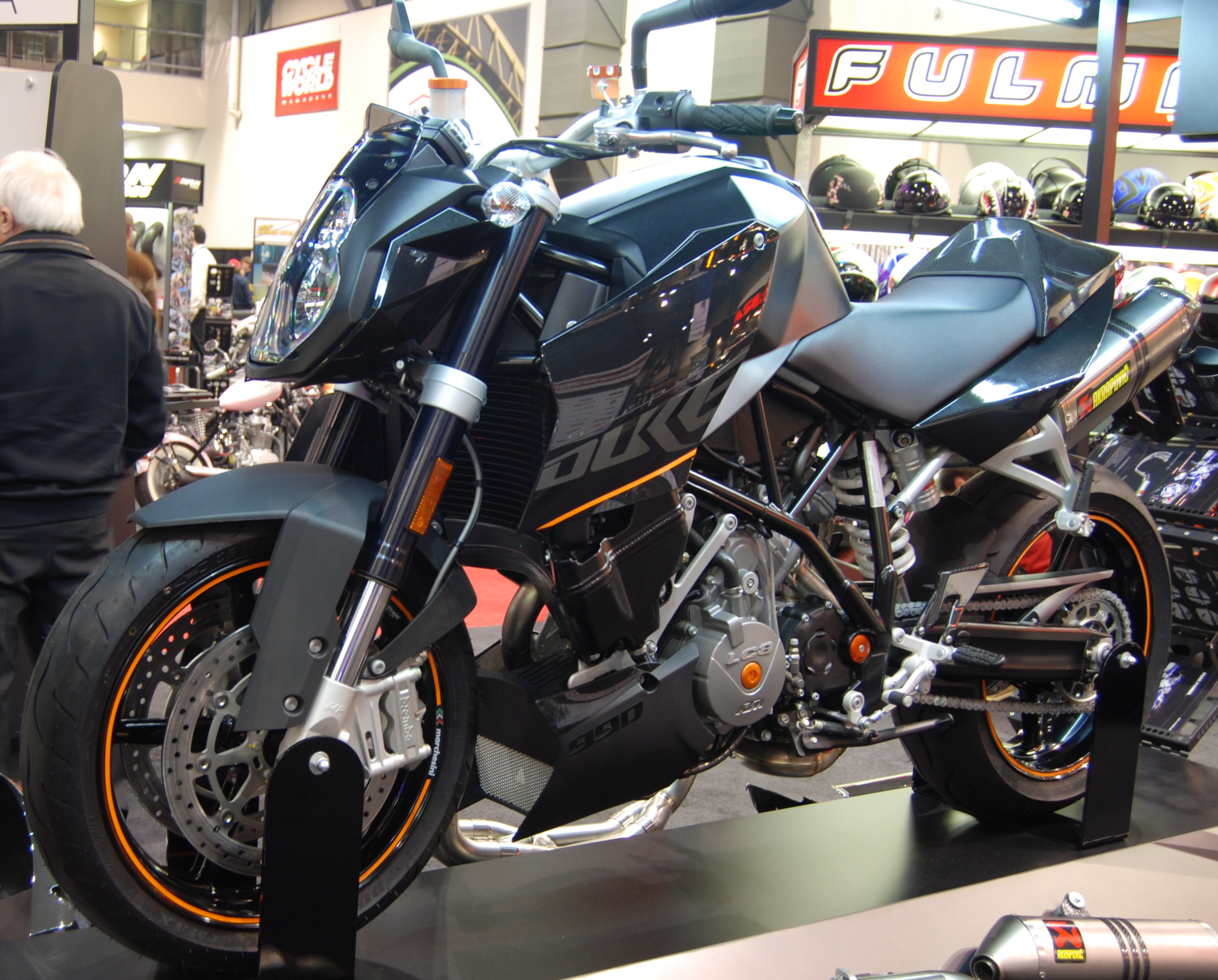
- 2009 990 Super Duke
- Manufacturer: KTM
- Production: 2005–2013
- Successor: KTM 1290 Super Duke R
- Class: Naked
- Engine: 999 cc (61.0 cu in), Four stroke, 75°V-twin cylinder, DOHC, 4 valves per cylinder
- Bore / stroke: 101 mm × 62.4 mm (3.98 in × 2.46 in)
- Compression ratio: 11.5:1
- Transmission: 6-speed, wet clutch, X-ring chain drive
- Frame type: Steel tube trellis
- Suspension: Front: 48 mm adjustable upside-down WP fork Rear: Adjustable WP shock
- Brakes: Front: 2 x 320mm discs 4 piston calipers Rear: Single 240mm disc 1 piston caliper
- Tires: Front: 120/70 ZR17; Rear: 180/55 ZR17
- Wheelbase: 1,438 mm

The KTM 990 Super Duke is a motorcycle from the Austrian manufacturer KTM.

The KTM 990 Super Duke was released in 2005 with updates in 2007 and 2012. In 2008 KTM released an R model which was available until 2011. For 2012 and 2013 KTM combined parts of the regular and R model sold the model as 990 Super Duke R. Production of the KTM 990 Super Duke R ended in 2013 and in 2014 the KTM 1290 Super Duke R was introduced.

== Design ==
The KTM 990 Super Duke has a naked body style and was designed by Gerald Kiska at the KISKA GmbH design studio in September 2003. It is built around a chromium-molybdenum trellis frame with powder-coated aluminum sub-frame and KTM LC8 engine used in several other KTM motorcycles. The engine in the KTM 990 Super Duke is a DOHC 999.8cc 75° V-twin with four valves per cylinder. The liquid cooled engine has an 11.5:1 compression ratio and uses dry sump lubrication with two rotor pumps. It has a six speed gearbox and a wet multi-plate clutch, and chain final drive.

Suspension is made by WP (in 1995, KTM Motorradholding GmbH acquired Swedish motorcycle maker Husaberg AB and took control of the Dutch company, White Power Suspension). It consists of a 48 mm upside down fork with 24° rake at the front and a WP fully adjustable shock absorber with a 4”/103 mm trail at the rear. Brakes are twin 320 mm discs with 4 piston calipers at the front and a single 240 mm disc with a single piston caliper at the rear. They are made by Brembo.

== Facelifts and KTM 990 Super Duke R ==
=== 2007 update ===
In 2007 the KTM 990 Super Duke was updated. The new model received a slight reduction of the steering head angle to 66.1° (previously 66.5°). Changes to the electronic fuel injection system were made to improve throttle response, smooth out the power delivery, and meet emissions standards. Another result of this were improved fuel economy and thus improved range. To further increase range the fuel tank's capacity was increased from 15 liters to 18.5 liters.

The front brakes were updated from axial mounted brake calipers to radial mounted brake calipers.

Along mechanical updates the 2007 model received an updated dashboard, headlight, headlight fairings, tank fairings and tank shape.

=== 2007–2011 KTM 990 Super Duke R ===
In 2007 KTM also introduced the KTM 990 Super Duke R. This model was different from the regular KTM 990 Super Duke because of the following:

- Seat was updated to a monoposto single seat
- Engine redline was increased*
- Engine power was increased from 120 hp (88 kW) at 9,000 rpm to 132 hp (97 kW) at 10,000 rpm*
- Exhaust headers made by Akrapovič*
- Steering head angle changed from 66.1° to 67.3°
- Rear suspension travel was reduced by 10 mm to 150 mm
- Uprated suspension with TiAlN coating
- Linear steering damper was added
- Front and rear axle sliders
- Spools on swing arm for rear stand
- Orange powder coated frame and rear shock absorber spring
- Black brake calipers, front stanchions, engine mounts and swing arm

* Not applicable to 2007 KTM 990 Super Duke R, only on 2008–2011 models

=== 2012 update ===
In 2012 KTM combined parts of the regular KTM 990 Super Duke and the KTM 990 Super Duke R and sold the model as KTM 990 Super Duke R. Differences compared to the original KTM 990 Super Duke were:

- Engine power was increased from 120 hp (88 kW) to 125 hp (92 kW)
- Steering head angle changed from 66.1° to 67.3°
- Rear suspension travel was reduced by 10 mm to 150 mm
- Uprated suspension with TiAlN coating
- Linear steering damper was added
- Front and rear axle sliders
- Spools on swing arm for rear stand
- Orange powder coated frame and rear shock absorber spring
- Black brake calipers, front stanchions, engine mounts and swing arm
- Square buttons instead of round buttons on dashboard

=== All available colours ===
==== 2005–2006 ====
Frame: Black with silver swing arm

Fairings: Titanium, Black and Orange

==== 2007–2011 (KTM 990 Super Duke) ====
Frame: Black or white frame with black swing arm (silver swing arm in 2007)

Fairings: Orange, white, olive and glossy black

==== 2007–2011 (KTM 990 Super Duke R) ====
Frame: Orange with black swing arm

Fairings: Matte black (2007–2008) White (2009–2011)

==== 2012–2013 ====
Frame: Orange with black swing arm

Fairings: White
