= BMW S1000R =

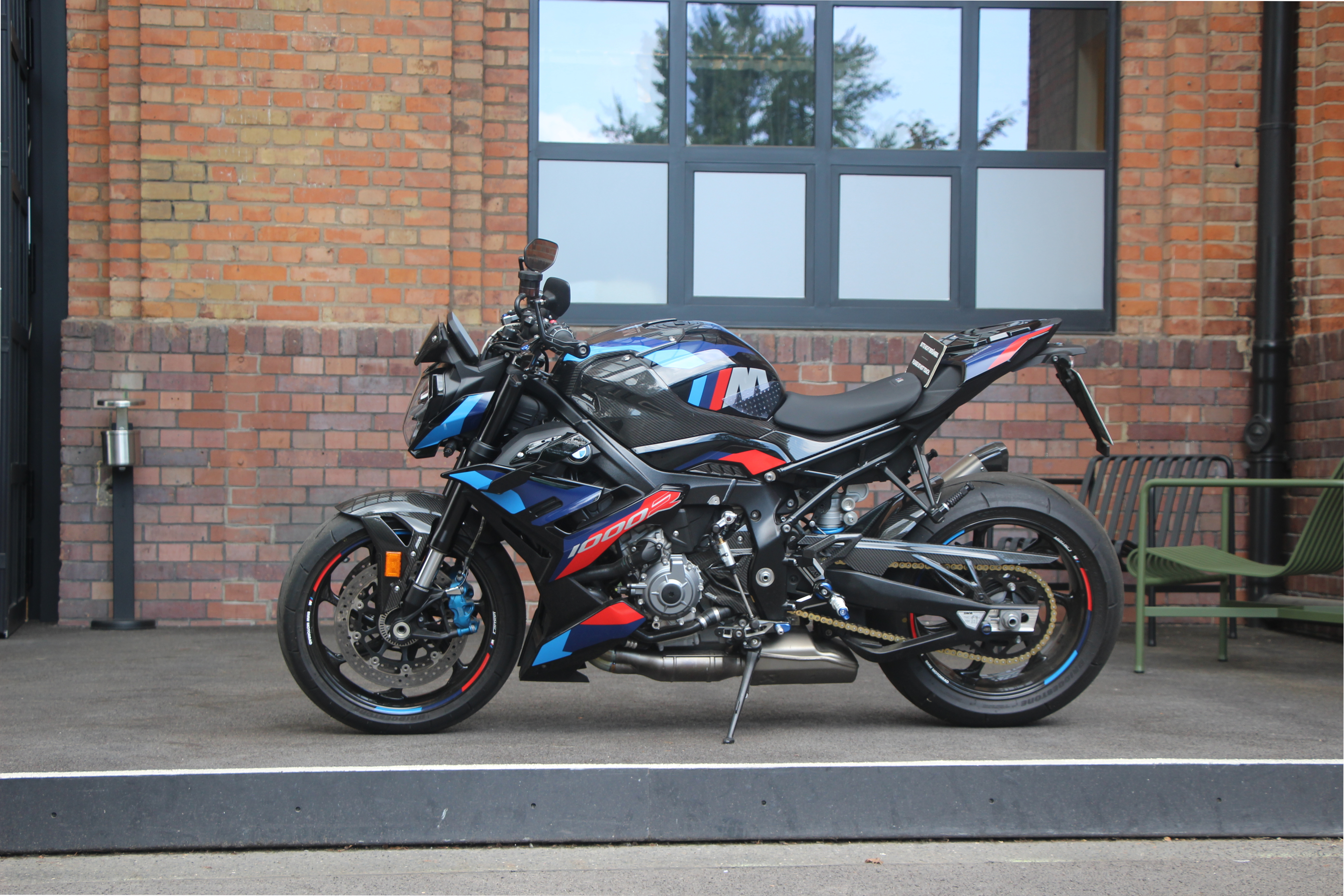
- Manufacturer: BMW Motorrad
- Production: 2014–present
- Class: Standard; Naked bike
- Engine: 999 cc (61.0 cu in) liquid-cooled 4-stroke 16-valve DOHC inline-four
- Bore / stroke: 80 mm × 49.7 mm (3.1 in × 2.0 in)
- Compression ratio: 12.0:1
- Top speed: 257 km/h (160 mph) (estimated)
- Power: 118 kW (158 hp; 160 PS) @ 11,000 rpm (claimed)
- Torque: 112 N⋅m (83 lbf⋅ft) @ 9,250 rpm (claimed)
- Transmission: 6-speed constant mesh, chain final drive
- Suspension: Front: Inverted 46 mm (1.8 in) telescopic fork, compression and rebound stage adjustable; Rear: Aluminium swingarm, rebound damping adjustable monoshock
- Brakes: Front: Radially-mounted Brembo 4-piston caliper with dual 320 mm (12.6 in) discs; Rear: Single-piston caliper with single 220 mm (8.7 in) disc
- Tires: Front: 120/70–17; Rear: 190/55–17
- Rake, trail: 23.9°, 95.9 mm (3.8 in)
- Wheelbase: 1,439 mm (56.7 in)
- Dimensions: L: 2,057 mm (81.0 in); W: 845 mm (33.3 in); H: 1,228 mm (48.3 in)
- Seat height: 814 mm (32.0 in)
- Fuel capacity: 17.5 L (3.8 imp gal; 4.6 US gal)
- Related: BMW S1000RR; BMW S1000XR

The BMW S1000R is a naked motorcycle manufactured by BMW Motorrad since 2014. It is based upon the S1000RR superbike with which it shares its engine, gearbox, frame and suspension.

The detuned inline-four engine from the S1000RR is optimized for low to mid range performance and delivers a maximum output of 118 kW (158 hp; 160 PS) at 11,000 rpm and maximum torque of 112 N⋅m (83 lbf⋅ft) at 9,250 rpm.

== 2017 update ==
The new 2017 model has increased power, maximum of 123 kW (165 hp; 167 PS), which is 5 kW (7 hp; 7 PS) more than the previous model. It is also 3 kg (6.6 lb) lighter than the previous model. It has an upgraded ABS, traction control and a new exhaust. The lighter frame and upgraded electronics are taken from the S1000RR.

Like the S1000RR, it has BMW's "Gearshift Assist Pro" quickshifter as standard, which augments its performance. BMW also added launch control as part of its Dynamic Traction Control (DTC) system.

== 2021 update ==
The new "Gen 3" 2021 model has a completely revised design choice taking cues from the 2019> RR model, also using the engine unit from the 2019 RR albeit without the shift-cam technology making a maximum of 123 kW (165 hp; 167 PS) and revving to 12,750rpm. It is also lighter than the previous model, ranging from 194 kg to 199 kg depending on specification choices. It has upgraded ABS, traction control and a new exhaust along with improved suspension. The lighter frame and upgraded electronics are once again taken from the S1000RR.

To harness the power output, BMW gave the S1000R a package of electronics suite of rider aids, including ABS Pro (cornering ABS), Dynamic Traction Control (DTC), Dynamic Traction Control Wheelie Function, Shift Assistant Pro (which allows for clutch-less up and downshifts), Hill Start Control (HSC), Launch Control and Pit Lane Limiter. There are four pre-set riding modes: "Rain", "Road", "Dynamic" and "Dynamic Pro" the latter of which can be custom tuned and come with a three-stage engine-braking adjustment and wheelie control.

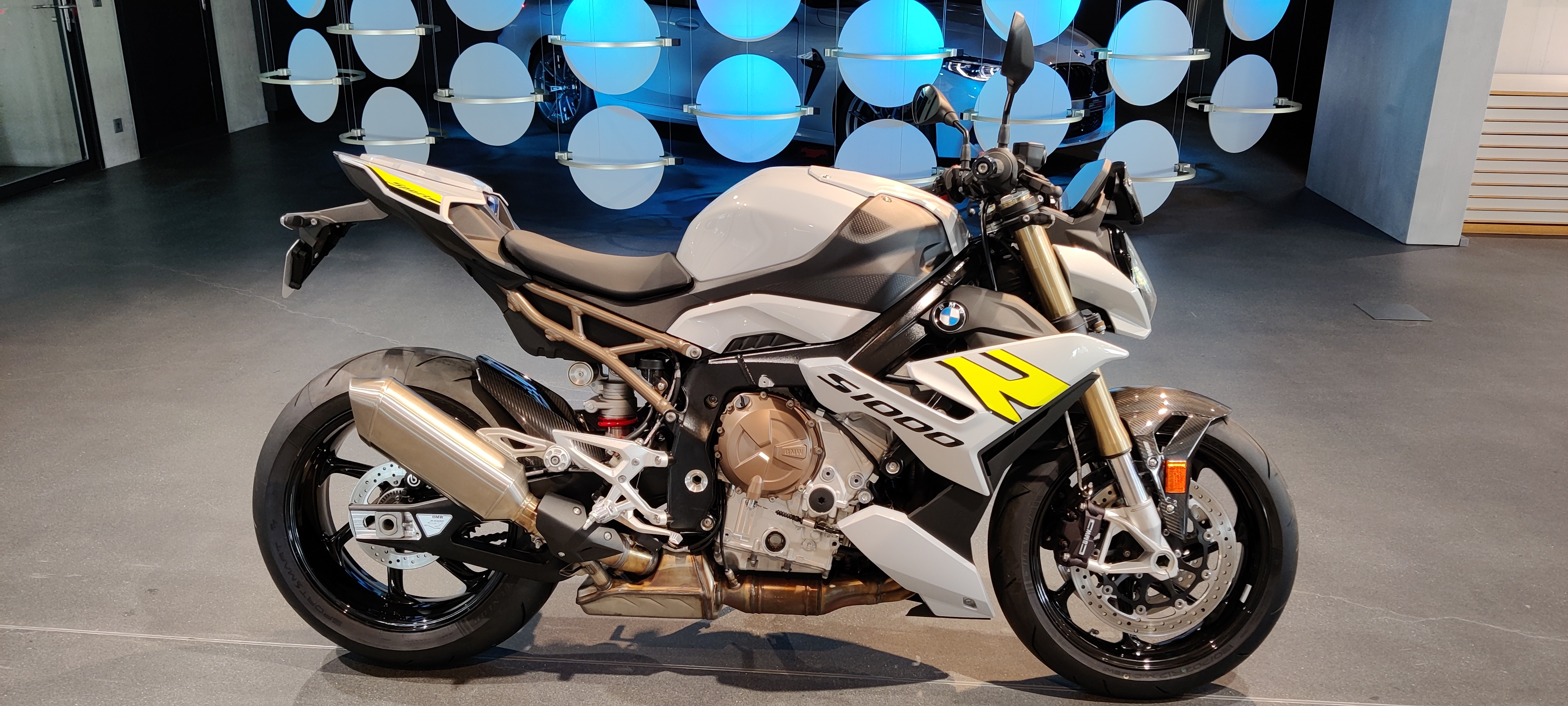
Updated styling of the 2021 model

The chassis has been revamped for the 2021 S1000R using the same as the 2019> S1000RR, which is focusing on weight reduction while improving handling. The aluminium perimeter frame drops 1.28 kg (2.8 lb) of weight, now using the engine as more of a load-bearing unit and reducing width by 13 mm (0.51 in). With a focus on improving agility, BMW steepened the steering head angle to 66.9 degrees and reduced trail to 93.9 mm (3.70 in). The wheelbase has been increased by 9 mm (0.35 in). The front suspension is a 45 mm (1.77 in) inverted telescopic fork, which is decreased in size from 46 mm (1.81 in), that is claimed to optimize flex and mid-corner feel. BMW Dynamic Damping Control (DDC) semi-active suspension is still available on the S1000R as an option, which has been enhanced with updated damping settings. The fuel tank and seat design are now slimmer. The front fairing is narrower and more aerodynamic than its predecessor, and the headlight is now a single LED unit, with the intake directly centred at the front for optimum airflow. The instrumentation now uses a 6.5-inch TFT display, which has a host of different tech and settings.

As with the RR, The M package, is available, which includes motorsport paint finish, M carbon fibre wheels, an M lightweight battery, M Chassis Kit with rear ride height adjustment and swingarm pivot, the M Sport seat and a "Pro" riding mode. The package reduces the weight further to 193.5 kg (427 lb).
