= Quickshifter =

Vehicle component

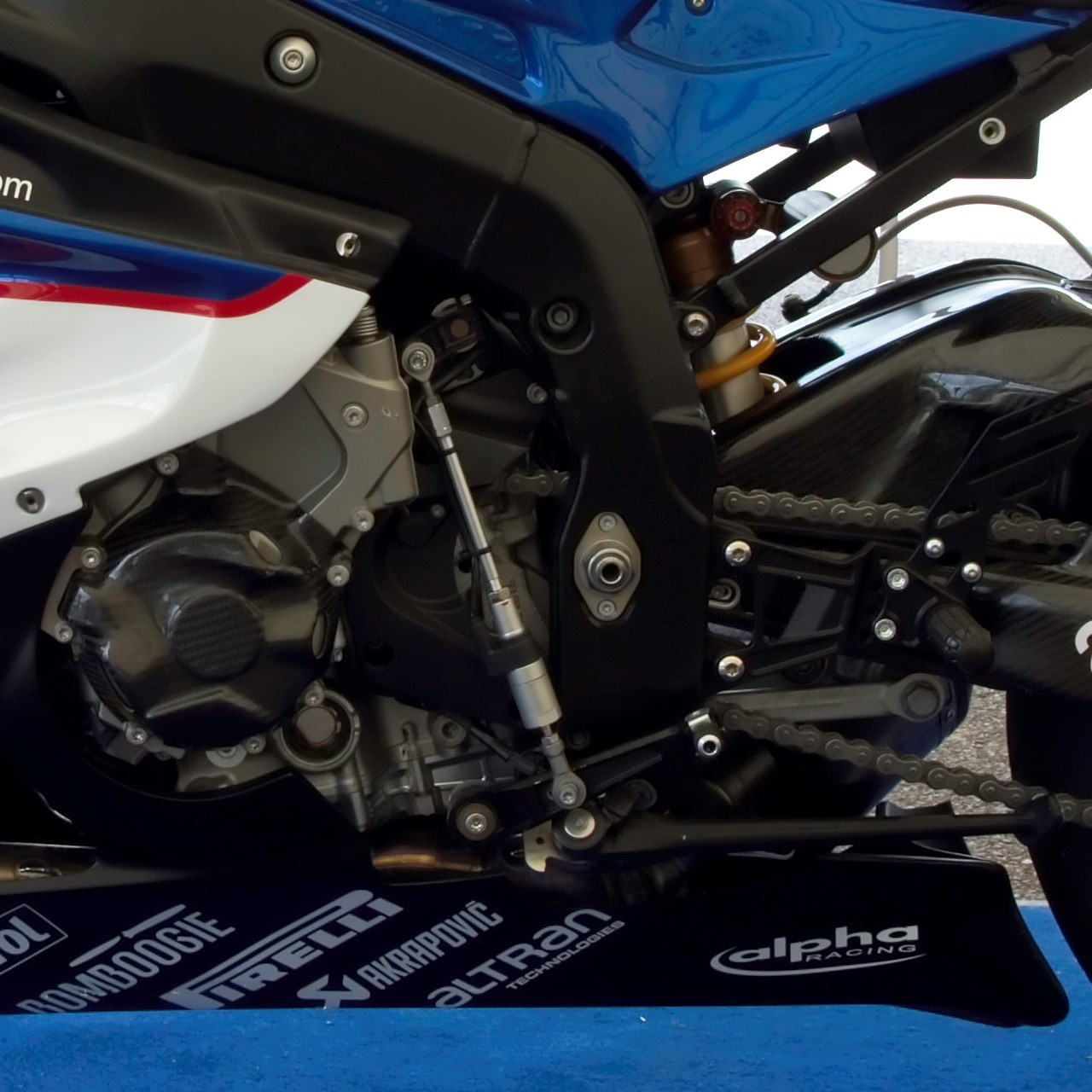
Quickshifter on a BMW S1000RR motorcycle.

A quickshifter or quick shifter is a device that eliminates the need to use the clutch or throttle when shifting gears on a manual transmission. This can increase the safety and comfort of the vehicle and allow for faster gear shifting (usually shifting in less than 50 milliseconds) and is thus a popular performance enhancement for motorcycles.

== Working mechanism ==
Almost all quickshifters for upshifts on motorcycles work on the same basis: a microcontroller detects the gear shift action via a sensor, calculates the shift timing, and momentarily cuts off the ignition, resulting in a reduction of the load at the transmission allowing the engine speed to match the transmission speed of the next gear and permit the gear to slip (and engage) into place. However, the method of sensing and reducing the load can vary.

=== Sensor types ===
Typically, the sensor is mounted in a way that it is a functional part of the gear shift linkage. The shift action by the rider results in an actuation force on the sensor. Depending on the shift linkage design the sensor specifically reacts either on a push or pull action.

Mechanical, linear, sensors typically close a micro switch at a factory preset force level in one particular direction only.

A more versatile sensor design uses a strain gauge to measure the level of the applied force in either direction. The design is typically linear (rod mounted) but can also be rotative (axle mounted). A dedicated micro controller, either purposely part of the sensor system alone or fully integrated in a quick shift module, normally has the flexibility to both set the required upshift direction (push / pull) and force sensitivity to detect the correct shift moment. In comparison with the mechanical type these relevant features ensure a more accurate, error free, shift detection for after-market applications, depending on rider preference, use case and, set correctly, reduce wear on the transmission gear selection system. Electronic sensor designs may be more complex and expensive but other than the above-mentioned advantages, may also be more reliable due to having no moving parts.

=== Quick shift module ===
The control module generally intervenes on the ignition and/or fuel supply to reduce the load on the transmission while shifting. Often an after-market stand-alone module, separate from the engine control unit (ECU), is used on older motorcycles. On modern motorcycles the engine management ECU itself performs the required calculations for the intervention. They can provide a near-perfect gear shift in tens of milliseconds.

=== Transmission load control ===
The load on the transmission is generally reduced (or "unloaded") by cutting off the ignition and/or fuel supply of the engine, or by disengaging the clutch. After the shift is completed, the engine torque i.e., load needs to return to the level prior to the shift to continue accelerating. To avoid a hard shock reaction on the chain drive, stand-alone modules can activate the cut cylinders in a staggered, controlled manner. To achieve this at least two separate control channels are required. Since the engine load is both reduced and reinstated in a precise and controlled manner (if tuned correctly) by the microcontroller, using a quickshifter is less damaging to the transmission than clutchless gear shifting without a quickshifter.

== Bi-directional quickshifter ==
A bi-directional quickshifter is a quickshifter that works on both directions of gearshift - upshifts and downshifts. Many quickshifters are bi-directional (sometimes called auto blippers), the term quickshifter alone is ambiguous since many are "mono-directional" quickshifters that only work in one direction, like the "Kawasaki Quick Shifter" (KQS) on the 2016 Kawasaki Ninja ZX-10R, and the 2015 H2/R or the QSS system used on a wide range of yamaha bikes, which works only for upshifting.

Examples of performance-oriented motorcycles using a bi-directional quickshifter are the BMW S1000RR and S1000R, 2017 ZX-10R and H2/R, Suzuki GSX-R1000/R, Aprilia RSV4, KTM Duke 390 etc.

== See also ==
- Dog clutch
- Motorcycle transmission
- Traction control system (TCS)
- Anti-lock braking system (ABS)
- Launch control
- Electronic stability control (ESC)
- Cruise control
