= Kawasaki Ninja H2 =

Sports motorcycle

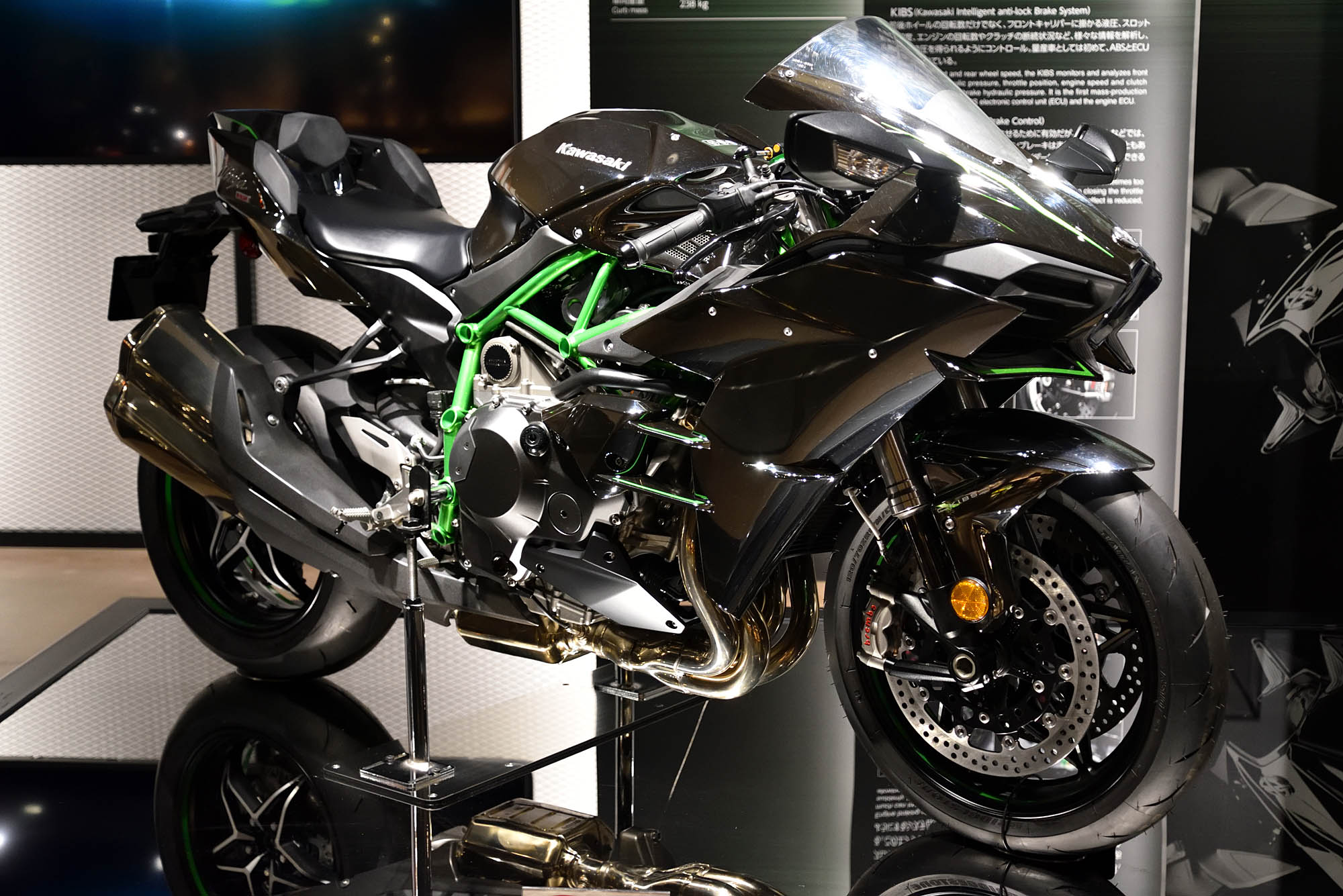
- Street-legal Ninja H2
- Manufacturer: Kawasaki Motors
- Parent company: Kawasaki Heavy Industries
- Production: 2015–Current
- Class: Street-legal sport bike (H2); Track-only sport bike (H2R)
- Engine: Supercharged (two-speed centrifugal) 998 cc DOHC 4-valve inline-4 four-stroke
- Bore / stroke: 76.0 mm × 55.0 mm (2.99 in × 2.17 in)
- Compression ratio: 8.5:1 (H2); 8.3:1 (H2R)
- Top speed: 296 km/h (184 mph) (H2 stock) (Note: H2 used for 400 km/h record was "specially prepped" according to Kawasaki.); 330 km/h (205 mph) (H2R stock)
- Power: H2: (2015–2018) 141.5 kW (189.8 hp) (rear wheel); 150 kW (200 hp) (claimed) @ 11,000 rpm (2019–) 180 kW (240 hp) (claimed); H2R: 326 hp (243 kW) @ 14,000 rpm
- Torque: H2: 123.7 N⋅m (91.2 lb⋅ft) (rear wheel); 133.5 N⋅m (98.5 lb⋅ft) (claimed) @10,500 rpm H2R: 156 N⋅m (115 lb⋅ft) @12,500 rpm
- Transmission: 6-speed
- Frame type: Steel trellis
- Suspension: H2: Front: 43 mm telescopic fork, preload-adjustable Rear: Single shock, preload-adjustable H2R: Front: Fully adjustable KYB telescopic fork with steering damper Rear: single-sided swingarm with monoshock
- Brakes: Front: 2 x 330 mm Brembo disc with radial-mount monoblock calipers Rear: 250 mm Brembo disc with radial-mount caliper
- Tires: H2: Front: 120/70ZR17; Rear: 200/55ZR17; H2R: Front: 120/60 R17 racing slicks Rear: 190/65 R17 racing slicks
- Rake, trail: 24.5°, 100 mm (4 in) (H2); 25.1°, 110 mm (4.3 in) (H2R)
- Wheelbase: 1,450 mm (57.1 in)
- Dimensions: L: 2,090 mm (82.1 in) (H2)
- Seat height: 32.5 in (830 mm) (H2); 830 mm (32.7 in) (H2R)
- Weight: 240.0 kg (529.0 lb) (H2) (wet); 215.9 kg (476.0 lb) (H2R) (wet)
- Fuel capacity: 17.03 L (3.75 imp gal; 4.50 US gal)

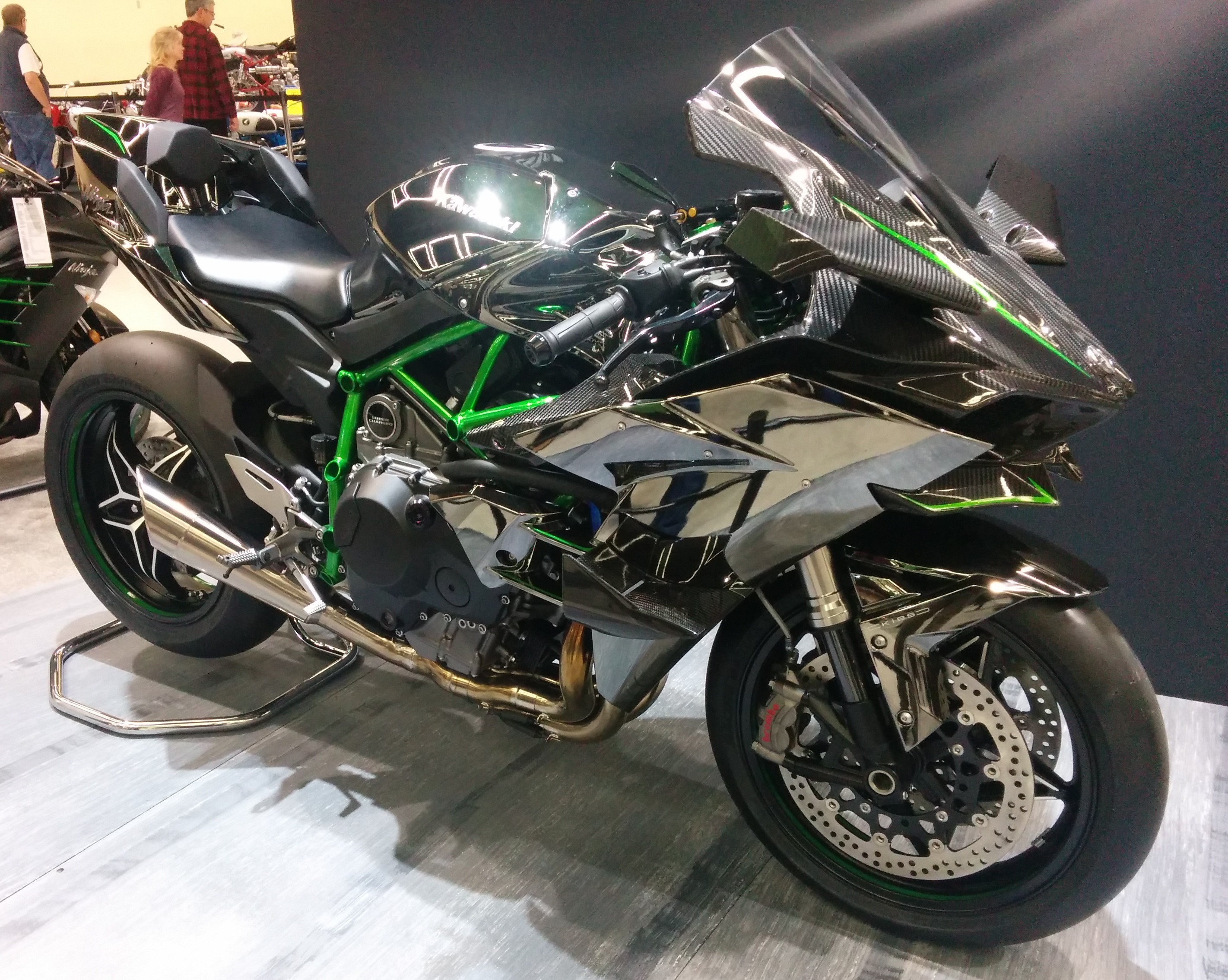
Track-only Ninja H2R

The Kawasaki Ninja H2 is a supercharged four-stroke hypersport-class motorcycle in the Ninja sports bike series manufactured by Kawasaki, featuring a variable-speed centrifugal supercharger.

Its namesake is the 750 cc Kawasaki H2 Mach IV, an inline triple that was introduced by Kawasaki in 1972 to "disrupt what it saw as a sleeping motorcycle market".

Its Ninja H2R track-only variant is the fastest and most powerful production motorcycle on the market, producing a maximum of 310 horsepower (230 kW) and 326 horsepower (243 kW) with ram-air. The H2R has 50% more power than the fastest street-legal motorcycles, while the street-legal Ninja H2 has a lower power output of 200 hp (150 kW)–210 hp (160 kW) with ram-air.

== Design ==
Kawasaki selected the literbike platform for its top-of-the-line Ninja H2 model, rather than continuing with the higher-displacement Ninja ZX-14 hyperbike. Cycle World's Kevin Cameron explained that the literbike class is "the center of the high-performance market", attracting the best development in racing, with the best chassis and suspension design, so it made sense for Kawasaki to create a machine that could leverage this.

The H2 is the first production motorcycle with a supercharger, although turbochargers were available on some models in the early 1980s.

Specifications in the infobox are from Kawasaki unless noted.

=== Production ===
The street-legal Ninja H2 has mirrors in place of the track-only H2R's winglets, and plastic body panels in place of the H2R's carbon-fiber panels but there is the H2 carbon version that has them in carbon. The street-legal H2 is said to make 200 horsepower (150 kW), probably with reduced supercharger boost compared to the H2R. The H2 and H2R share the supercharger (with a lower boost level on the H2) and many other components, with the exception of the head gasket, cam profile and timing with ECU mapping, exhaust system, and clutch (the H2R's clutch has two additional plates).

For 2017, Kawasaki made a limited-edition model with 120 units produced globally: the individually numbered Kawasaki Ninja H2 Carbon with special paint and carbon-fiber upper cowl. For 2017, the standard Ninja H2 was also updated.

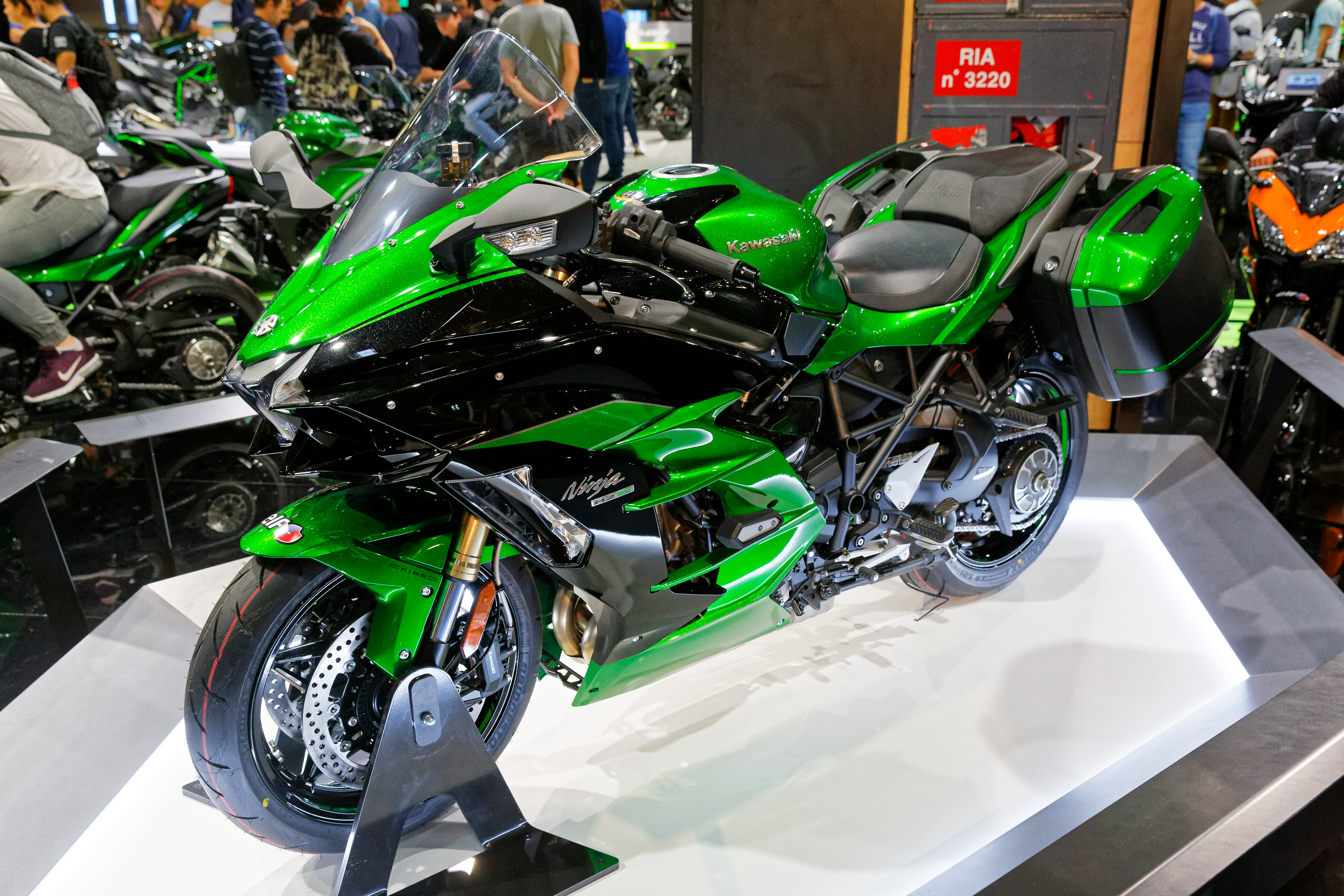
2018 Kawasaki Ninja H2 SX

For 2018, Kawasaki made a new sport touring version of the H2, the Kawasaki H2 SX, with a claimed wet weight of 256.1 kg (564.5 lb). Features that are options on the base model H2 SX come standard on the Kawasaki H2 SX SE, which has a claimed wet weight of 260.0 kg (573.3 lb). It has revised throttle bodies, camshafts, crankshaft, pistons, cylinder and cylinder head as well as a new exhaust system aimed at increasing mid range torque. The intake system and supercharger impeller were also redesigned. A new larger fuel tank, rear trellis subframe and panniers increase the bike's weight by 19 pounds (8.6 kg).

For 2019, the H2 received an update with 15% more power from updates to the intake, spark plugs, ECU, and air filter, among other components. Also added was a new LED lighting scheme and a special top coat of paint that is claimed to be self-healing and able to smooth over small scratches in warmer conditions. Also new were lighter and smaller Brembo Stylema calipers, a new TFT dash, and smartphone connectivity that provides information about the GPS route, speed, RPM, current gear, fuel mileage, fuel level, and odometer. In addition, the 2019 Ninja H2 SX SE+ features electronically controlled suspension.

The H2 SX was named one of the best sport-touring motorcycles by Cycle World in 2025.

=== Engine and supercharger ===
The H2's engine is a 998 cc (60.9 cu in) 4-valve, dual overhead cam inline-4 with a two-speed centrifugal supercharger.

The supercharger is driven by a series of gears and shafts connecting the flywheel to a planetary drive, finally spinning a dog-shifted two-speed shaft attached to the impeller. Throttle control is electronic. A centrifugal supercharger has the advantage of generating less heat than other designs, especially scroll-type or screw-type superchargers. Without an intercooler (which the H2 lacks), excess heat in the intake charge can cause pre-ignition that can damage or destroy the engine.

=== Electronic aids ===
Electronic rider aids include an anti-lock braking system (ABS), Kawasaki Traction Control (KTRC), Kawasaki Engine Brake Control (KEBC), a Kawasaki Quick Shifter (KQS), an electronic steering damper (ESD), and Kawasaki Launch Control Mode (KLCM).

=== Aerodynamics ===
The front fairing of the Ninja H2R incorporates winglets made of carbon fiber, just like the rest of the H2R-exclusive bodywork. They may be aerodynamic devices designed to create a low-pressure zone to help move cooling air through the engine bay, to produce downforce at high speed, or to provide straight-line stability in a short-wheelbase sportsbike chassis.

=== Chassis ===
The H2 and H2R have a tubular, thin-wall steel trellis frame and a single-sided swingarm, with a traditional sportsbike wheelbase of 1,450 mm (57 in).

Explaining the advantages of Kawasaki's approach to exploiting aerodynamics instead of lengthening the wheelbase, Independent Online's Dave Abrahams said, "It's easy to build stability into a hard-accelerating drag machine with a long wheelbase... but Kawasaki wanted a track-day machine, one that would also go round corners." High speed motorcycles often have long wheelbases. Extra length is added by the extended swingarm on a typical drag motorcycle, and a typical land speed record streamliner has a meters-long wheelbase (3.7 meters for the current record holder, Ack Attack).

== Pre-Intermot engine announcements and analysis ==
The H2 was announced by Kawasaki in a late-2014 teaser campaign, and was widely expected to be fully revealed at the Intermot motorcycle trade show the same year. Before full details were released by Kawasaki, the supercharged inline-4 engine was thought by several industry observers to be identical to, or closely related to, a nearly 1,000 cc inline-4 with a centrifugal supercharger displayed by Kawasaki at the 2013 Tokyo Motor Show. (Note: Cameron also recalled Kawasaki's supercharged piston engine experience with the WWII era Kawasaki Ha40 aircraft engine.)

Cameron published an analysis showing that an engine of that displacement, mildly boosted at 5 psi (34 kPa), would generate 203 horsepower (151 kW)—more than that of Kawasaki's current leader, the 191.7-horsepower (143.0 kW) ZX-14 (horsepower figures are expressed at the rear wheel). The same engine would generate 257 horsepower (192 kW) with 10 psi (69 kPa) of pressure. His analysis included a discussion of the benefits of a two-speed supercharger for more linear power delivery (as opposed to the intractable Japanese turbo bikes of the 1980s that suffered from turbo lag). Cameron also said Kawasaki patent documents suggested the engine would rely on evaporative cooling using port fuel injection, instead of a bulky intercooler.

Kawasaki claimed the 2013 model had the first supercharger designed by a motorcycle manufacturer. In 2013, journalists said that the engine could power the "next generation [Ninja] ZX-14R" sportbike. Journalists also noted that Kawasaki already has a production inline-4 supercharged (albeit intercooled) engine powering the Jet Ski Ultra 300X personal watercraft.

== Production announcement ==
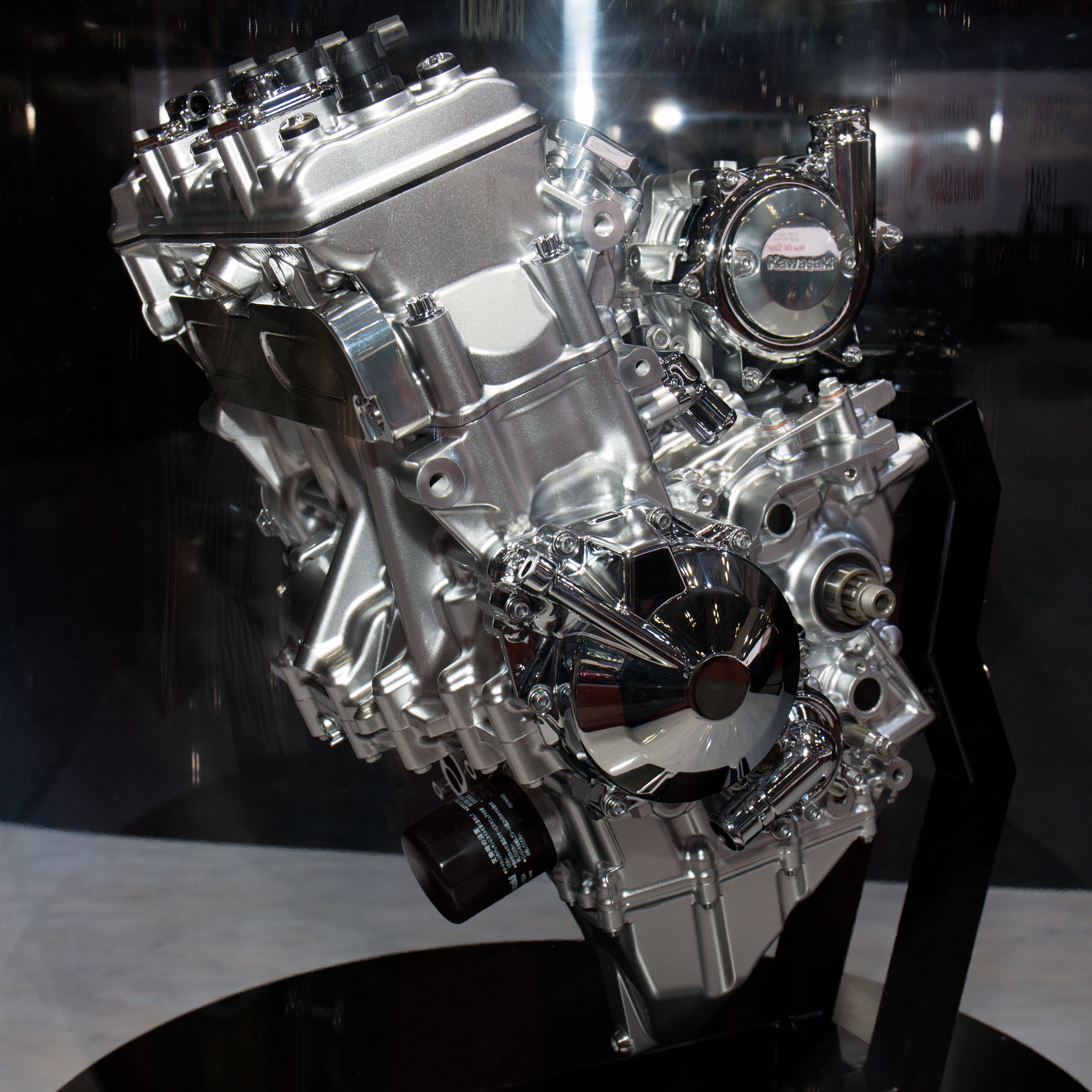
Engine shown at 2013 Tokyo Motor Show; supercharger has cover embossed "Kawasaki" to right of cylinders

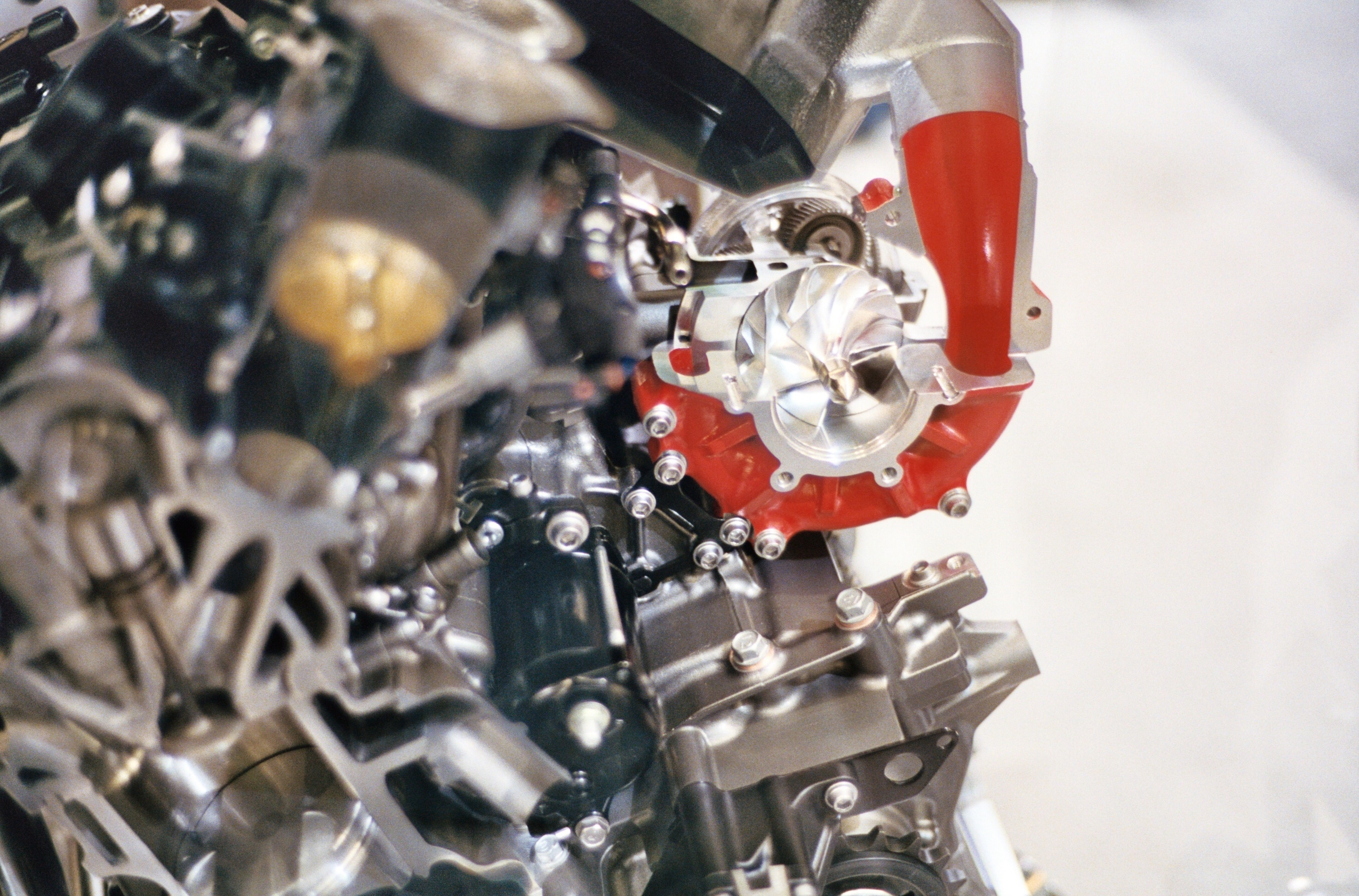
Cutaway H2R engine and supercharger. Orange painted plenum surrounds impeller, behind which is visible part of planetary gear system.

At the 2014 Intermot motorcycle trade show on September 30, 2014, Kawasaki announced that a race-only Ninja H2R model would be produced in addition to the detuned street-legal Ninja H2, which would be fully revealed at the EICMA trade show in November. The bike was shown for the first time in North America at the AIMExpo show at Orlando, Florida in October, 2014.

According to details Kawasaki made public about the H2's engine at Intermot, it was confirmed to be a 998 cc inline-four engine with a supercharger, producing 300 horsepower (220 kW) in the track-only H2R variant, still by far the highest rated engine ever for any factory production motorcycle (50% more than its nearest competitor, the BMW S1000RR).

=== Reception ===
Global press coverage both before and after Intermot was extensive.

Before the full reveal of the H2R, reactions tended to emphasize the reintroduction of forced induction to the motorcycle marketplace, with headlines like "Hail the New Supercharged Era" (Autoevolution), "Supercharged Ninja imminent" (Motor Cycle News), "New Kawasaki sports bike will use a 1000cc supercharged engine" (Visordown (UK)),^{2014} "Kawasaki officially uncovers Ninja H2 supercharger" (Cycle Online (Australia)), "Kawasaki Ninja H2: How the supercharger works" (Motociclismo), and "Kawasaki's H2 superbike: A technical look at Kawasaki’s upcoming supercharged superbike" (Cycle World).

After the introduction, before any test rides had even been permitted, coverage turned to both the bike's unusual styling and its precedent setting power. Both industry and general-readership press said the machine "will beat up the supersport scene with a steam hammer" (Der Tagesspiegel), "smashes the superbike class" (Gizmag), is "a game changer" (Autoevolution), "a quantum leap into the future that redefines the way we see motorcycles" (Independent Newspapers), and "the poster child of 2-wheeled insanity ... so extreme it's hard to comprehend" (Road & Track), or was simply "radical" (Motor Cycle News) and even "ludicrous" (Bloomberg Businessweek).

Cycle World and Motor Cycle News both commented on how Kawasaki had claimed the high end of the market with the H2, moving past a stagnant market (at least from the Japanese Big Four manufacturers) full of cookie-cutter sportsbikes and low-priced entry-level bikes, and had set up the H2 as a halo model for the entire brand. Cameron said, "When we look at the current crop of 1000s, all date from before our present "recession," and what little has come by way of new product has sought to please the mostly imaginary "new buyer" with low-tech delights." Highlighting Kawasaki's ability to create a product leveraging aerodynamic, turbine and engine technology design expertise from across the large Kawasaki Heavy Industries conglomerate (called a "vast industrial complex" by Sport Rider), an unsigned Motor Cycle News piece said "The H2R you see here is the very pinnacle of what Kawasaki can do ... This is the firm's halo product, and every element is Kawasaki at its very best, from the engine and aerodynamic development, through to the mirror-finish black chrome paint specially developed for this model."

Some analysts noted odd features of the supposedly track-only H2R model. Although it is outfitted with racing slicks and lacks many features required on a street-legal vehicle in most jurisdictions, such as headlights, rear view mirrors, and turn signals visible from the front or sides, it also has features that are unusual or absent on pure track bikes, such as an ignition lock and LED tail light.

== Speed record attempts ==
=== H2 ===
Cycle World recorded a 1/4-mile time of 9.62 seconds at 152.01 mph (244.64 km/h), with a 0 to 60 mph (97 km/h) acceleration time of 2.6 seconds and a top speed of 183 mph (295 km/h). Kent Kunitsugu, editor for Sport Rider magazine, competing in a land-speed racing event in Mojave, California at the Mojave Air and Space Port airfield in the Mojave Magnum land-speed racing, took a Ninja H2 with just a few bolt-on performance parts adding over 70 horsepower and achieved a top speed of 226.9 mph (365.2 km/h).

On August 12, 2018, rider Shigeru Yamashita, with an unofficial team of Kawasaki employees (known as Team 38), set a 202.743 mph (326.28 km/h) speed record in the Southern California Timing Association (SCTA) P-PB 1000 class for under-1,000 cc displacement production supercharged motorcycles with limited modifications at the Bonneville Speedway. On August 15, Yamashita broke his own record with a new speed of 209.442 mph (337.06 km/h).

=== H2R ===
==== 2015 ====
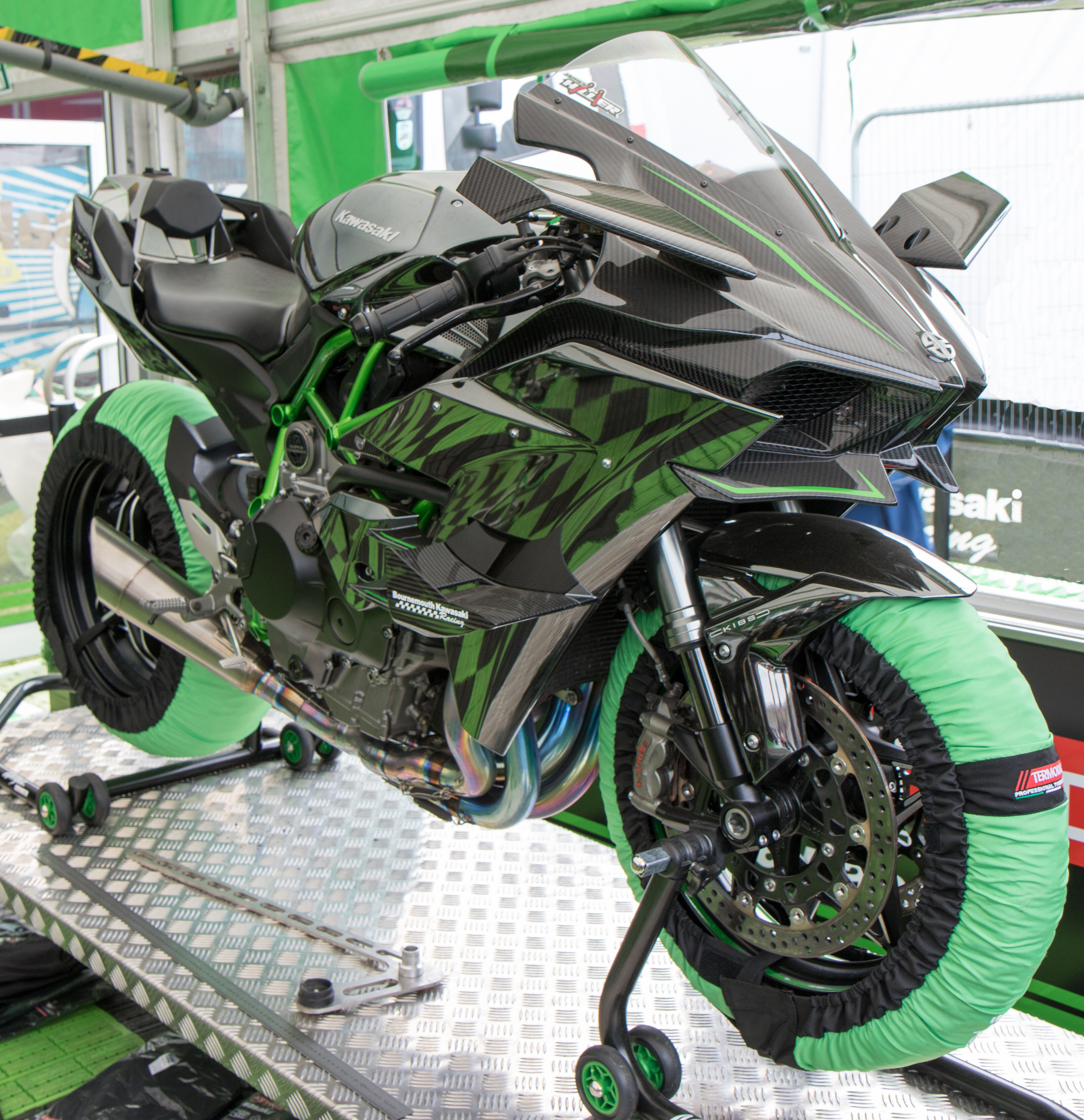
James Hillier's H2R (by Quattro Plant/Bournemouth Kawasaki). Tyre warmers were electrically heated before the demonstration run.

In June 2015, TT race competitor James Hillier rode a Kawasaki H2R around the 37 3/4-mile TT road course as an inter-race demonstration lap at near-race speeds, using normal Superbike slick race tires, leading to a TT record of the highest top speed attained in the Isle of Man by a motorcycle. The top speed of "over 206 mph" (332 km/h) on the Sulby Straight was recorded on Hillier's personal Strava GPS smartphone app for cyclists.

==== 2016 ====
On June 30, 2016, Kenan Sofuoglu, a five-time world champion Supersport circuit-racer, made a top speed attempt. Kawasaki supplied a stock H2R augmented only with special tires developed by Pirelli for the top speed attempt to withstand extreme high speeds, and the bike was supplied with race-grade fuel. Sofuoglu was also supplied with a special one-piece leather suit to enhance aerodynamics for his record attempt.

This attempt, with the Turkish president in attendance, was made across the then-newly completed Osman Gazi Bridge, at the time was the fourth longest in the world at just over a mile and a half. Kawasaki quoted the H2R's maximum speed to be 380 km/h (236 mph). After training and preparing for four months, a speed of 400 km/h (249 mph) in 26 seconds was claimed by a video-recording of the bike's dashboard display.

The speed was not officially confirmed or independently verified. No fixed point optical sensors for distance/speed calculations, chronometers, or hand-held devices were used, and the speed was only given later with a theoretical calculation, using the distance he traveled in 26 seconds on the 8,799-foot-long (2,682 m) bridge. Cameron had calculated two years earlier that with the right gearing, the H2R's engine power could theoretically overcome aerodynamic drag up to 250–280 mph (402–451 km/h).

== See also ==
- Kawasaki Ninja series
- List of fastest production motorcycles by acceleration
- List of fastest production motorcycles

== Footnotes ==
=== Sources ===
- Siler, Wes (November 20, 2013), Supercharged Kawasaki!, RideApart
- Ets-Hokin, Gabe (November 21, 2013), Tokyo Motor Show 2013: Kawasaki, Motorcycle Daily
- Tibu, Florin (September 4, 2014), Hail the New Supercharged Era, Autoevolution
- Newland, Richard (September 1, 2014), "Supercharged Ninja imminent", Motorcycle News
- "Hear Kawasaki's supercharged Ninja H2", Bike Social (blog), Bennetts, September 3, 2014
- Cameron, Kevin (September 9, 2014), "Preview: Kawasaki's H2 superbike: A technical look at Kawasaki's upcoming supercharged superbike (based on what we know so far)", Cycle World
- Is this what the Ninja H2 will look like? New Kawasaki sports bike will use a 1000cc supercharged engine, says French bike mag, Visordown, September 11, 2014
- Shields, Matthew (September 19, 2014), Kawasaki officially uncovers Ninja H2 supercharger, Australia: Cycle Online
- Olgiati, Tarcisio (September 19, 2014), "Kawasaki Ninja H2: come funziona la sovralimentazione" [Kawasaki Ninja H2: How the supercharger works], Motociclismo (in Italian), archived from the original on September 21, 2014
- Lavrinc, Damon (September 29, 2014), Here's The First Shot Of Kawasaki's Supercharged Ninja H2, With Wings, Jalopnik, archived from the original on May 10, 2017
- Kiser, Jesse (September 30, 2014), 300HP Kawasaki Ninja H2 and H2R Specs & Details Revealed, RideApart
- Tibu, Florin (September 30, 2014), Kawasaki Ninja H2R Pics and Video Show a Game Changer, Autoevolution
- Blain, Liz (September 30, 2014), Kawasaki smashes the superbike class with 300-horsepower, supercharged Ninja H2R, Gizmag
- Cameron, Kevin (September 30, 2014), "2015 Kawasaki Ninja H2R Unveiled at INTERMOT: Supercharged track-only machine with 300 horsepower! Yes, 300 horsepower.", Cycle World
- "Cologne Show: Radical Kawasaki Ninja H2", Motor Cycle News, September 29, 2014
- Beeler, Jensen (September 30, 2014), "Kawasaki Ninja H2R – Officially 300hp of Hyperbike", Asphalt & Rubber
- Kunitsugu, Kent (September 30, 2014), "Kawasaki official debuts 2015 Ninja H2R", Sport Rider, Bonnier Corporation, archived from the original on October 3, 2014
- Madson, Bart (September 30, 2014), 2015 Kawasaki Ninja H2R First Look, Motorcycle USA, archived from the original on April 24, 2015
- Walter, Christoph (October 1, 2014), "Premieren auf der Motorradmesse Intermot: Dampfhammer bei Kawasaki, Tradition bei BMW" [Premiering at the Intermot motorcycle show: steam hammer by Kawasaki, tradition by BMW], Der Tagesspiegel (in German), Berlin
- Stock, Kyle (October 1, 2014), "Check out Kawasaki's totally illegal sportbike", Bloomberg Businessweek, archived from the original on October 2, 2014
- Abrahams, Dave (October 1, 2014), "Kawasaki's 220kW track-day special", Independent Online, South Africa: Independent Newspapers (Independent News & Media)
- Kierstein, Alex (September 30, 2014), "The Kawasaki Ninja H2R is the poster child of 2-wheeled insanity", Road & Track
- Bornhop, Andrew (October 15, 2014), "Video:Kawasaki H2R Presentation: Kawasaki reveals the track-only H2R "hyperbike" to the press at AIMExpo 2014", First Looks website, Cycle World
- Cameron, Kevin (November 4, 2014), "Kawasaki Ninja H2 Streetbike", Cycle World.

Records
Preceded by Ducati Panigale R	Fastest production motorcycle 2016–	Succeeded by
