= Forced induction in motorcycles =

Application of forced induction to a motorcycle engine

Forced induction in motorcycles is the application of forced induction (turbochargers or superchargers) to a motorcycle engine. Special automotive engineering and human factor considerations exist for the application of forced induction with motorcycles compared to other forms of motorized transportation.

== Forced induction in production motorcycles ==
Prior to the late 2010s, forced induction was only used on a handful of production motorcycles, all from Japanese Big Four manufacturers in the early 1980s.

- Honda 1982 CX 500 Turbo / 1983 650 Turbo
- Yamaha 1982-1983 XJ 650 Seca Turbo
- Suzuki 1983 XN 85 Turbo
- Kawasaki 1983-1985 GPZ750 Turbo

Honda CX650 Turbo had a 674 CC, 100 BHP V-twin engine. It is contestably the best forced induction production bike of the 1980s from any Japanese manufacturer. The 1983 model Honda CX650 Turbos had solved the lag problems that earlier models like the CX500 Turbo had encountered. To rectify turbo lags capacity and compression ratio was raised from 7.2:1 to 7.8:1.

Additionally, in 1978 Kawasaki offered the Z1R-TC, a semi-production model built by Turbo Cycle Corporation and sold through Kawasaki dealers. This is generally considered to be the first Japanese turbocharged motorcycle.

The Honda, Kawasaki and Suzuki bikes were all listed on a State Farm insurance "blacklist" published by American Motorcyclist in 1989.

=== 21st century ===
A scooter with a supercharger, the Peugeot JetForce Compressor, was available in late 2003.

Kawasaki confirmed it would be re-entering the market with the supercharged Kawasaki Ninja H2, announced in October, 2014. This was followed by the H2 SX SE sports tourer, and for 2020 Kawasaki announced a new naked model, designated Z H2.

=== Engineering and usability challenges ===
Designers have been able to address packaging issues and fit turbochargers even in fully faired motorcycles.

Turbo lag was noted as a problem with all four Japanese turbos of the 1980s by several critics. Motorcycle engineering expert and journalist Kevin Cameron has said that turbo lag is a critical problem with turbocharger applications on motorcycles: "[U]nless you are a pure drag racer, most of your riding will be off-boost. The lower your compression ratio, the less snap your bike will have...don't expect your turbo bike to be much use in sportbike-type canyon racing." Using a variable-geometry turbocharger can mitigate turbo lag, but has not yet been used in series production (the first mass market application was to late 1980s automobiles; see Variable-geometry turbocharger#History).

Writer Mick Walker has listed turbo lag along with other challenges like a higher center of gravity and heat transfer to rider due to turbocharger and associated exhaust plumbing. Bennett noted excessive weight and complexity in addition to weak bottom-end performance.

The German magazine Motorrad said in 2014, that a turbocharger would probably never be practical on mass market motorcycles due to cost of high-tech materials able to withstand the high temperatures of a variable geometry turbocharger, plus weight and space considerations, though they left the door open for a good supercharged solution.

=== Emissions ===
Emissions considerations, driven in particular by carbon dioxide limits in the European emission standards, are leading motorcycle manufacturers in the 2010s to reconsider applications of forced induction.

== In racing ==
In road racing, superchargers were not uncommon in the 1930s, and machines originally built for road racing also set many land speed records (see the list below for examples). Motorcycle racing in Europe went through a hiatus during the 1940s as World War II and its aftermath, and racing only restarted in 1946. That same year, forced induction was banned from road racing by the Fédération Internationale de Motocyclisme (FIM), effectively relegating it to specialized forms of racing and speed record runs, discussed further below. Rules from the FIM and other sanctioning bodies cover aspects of motorcycle design as diverse as motorcycle fairing coverage, gasoline direct injection, and the use of dual-clutch transmissions, and may influence street bike design by setting public expectations.

=== Drag racing ===
Specialized motorcycles used in drag racing, called dragbikes, are an application for forced induction, including nitrous oxide and multistage turbochargers. The first dragbike to run the quarter-mile in under 7 seconds was using a Roots-type supercharger.

== Motorcycle clubs ==
At least one motorcycle club, Turbo Motorcycle International Owners Association, has been formed to support turbo motorcycle enthusiasts.

== Notable prototypes and record setters ==
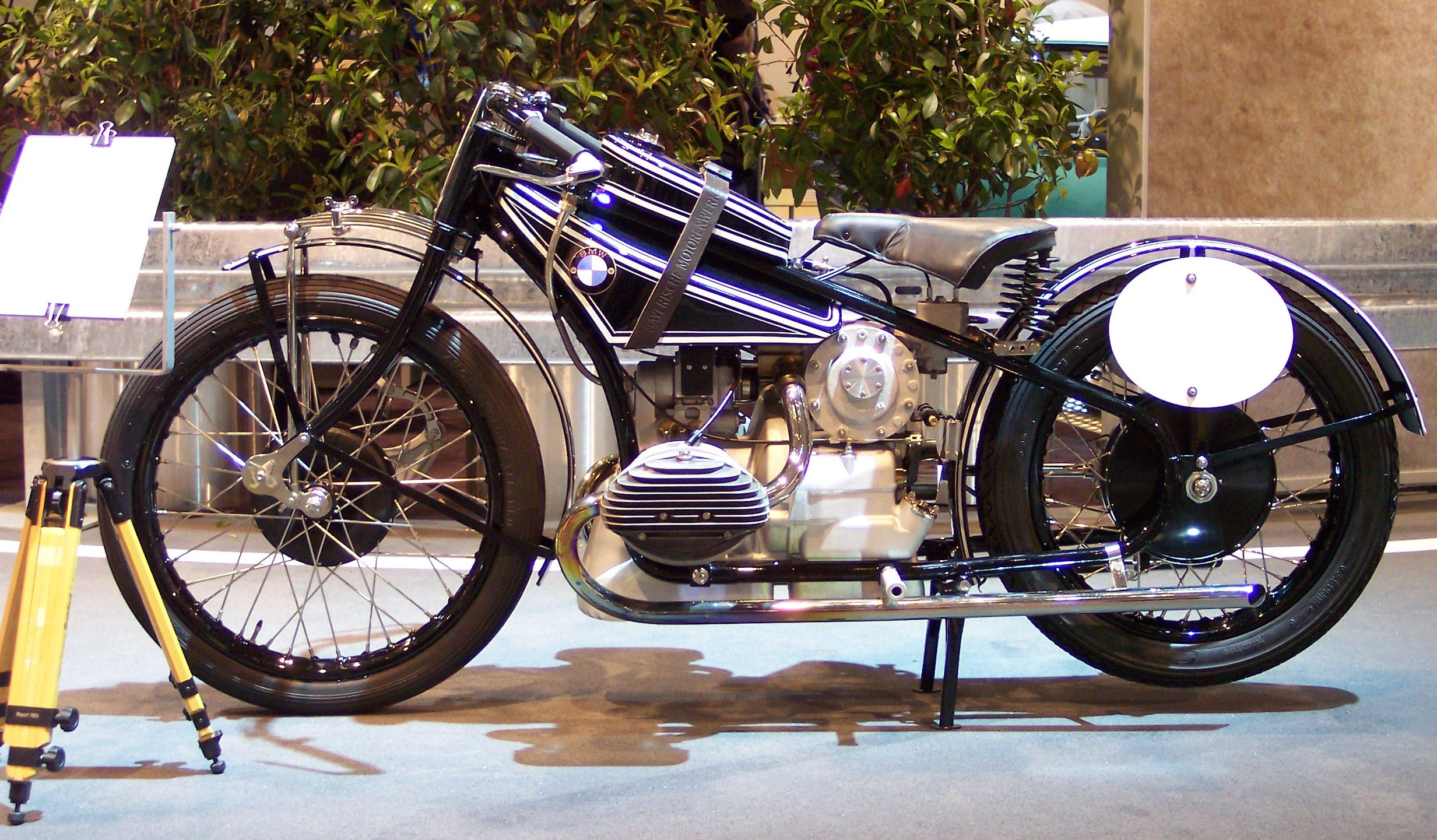
BMW WR 750 from 1930s, note supercharger under rider's saddle

- BMW WR 750, supercharged boxer twin, set several Motorcycle land speed records 1930–1935
- BMW Type 255 RS 500, supercharged boxer twin, ridden by Georg Meier to first Isle of Man TT win by non-Briton in 1939; auctioned in 2014 for the second-highest price ever for a motorcycle
- Gilera Rondine, 4-cylinder DOHC, supercharged, Piero Taruffi set land speed record with it in 1937
- Fritz Egli's turbo Kawasaki, covered in August 1988 Cycle as "world's fastest?"
- Bill Warner's 300+ mph turbo Hayabusa, set speed record for non-enclosed bike in 2011. Warner crashed it in 2013, resulting in his death.
- Cabin motorcycles:
  - Peraves Ecomobile, available with turbocharged BMW K1200 inline-four engine; "the only [fully-]enclosed motorcycle to enter long-term production"
- Motorcycle land speed record streamliners:
  - Ernst Jakob Henne's BMW RS 500-based streamliner "The Egg", set record in 1937 that stood 14 years; integral supercharger
  - NSU Delphin III, set record in 1956; rotary supercharger
  - Lightning Bolt, Don Vesco's streamliner, set record in 1978 that stood 12 years; twin turbo (2×inline-four engines)
  - BUB Seven streamliner, set speed records in 2006 and 2009; 500 hp (370 kW) turbo V-4 engine
  - Ack Attack, has held speed record since 2013; more than 900 hp (670 kW) twin turbo (2×inline-four engines)
  - Castrol Rocket, more than 1,000 hp (750 kW) quad turbo (2×straight-three engines)
- Guy Martin's Pikes Peak Hillclimb GSX-R 1100 turbo, more than 300 hp (220 kW)
- Neander Motors diesel; 94 hp (70 kW)/129 lb⋅ft (175 N⋅m) twin turbo parallel twin turbo-diesel
- Patrik Fürstenhoff's (a.k.a. "Ghost Rider") Guinness World Record turbo Suzuki Hayabusa – first documented wheelie over 200 mph (320 km/h); c. 500 hp (370 kW) inline-four
- Suzuki Recursion concept motorcycle; 100 hp (75 kW) turbo intercooled straight-twin
- Kawasaki's Team 38 racing team using a Ninja H2 at Bonneville Speedway recorded a 211.621 mph speed on the first pass on August 14 2018 and a return speed of 207.263 mph on August 15 to score a combined average of 209.442 mph. This was a record for the Southern California Timing Association (SCTA) P-PB 1000 class for stock under-1,000 cc displacement production supercharged motorcycles.
