= Suzuki Recursion =

Motorcycle model introduced in 2013

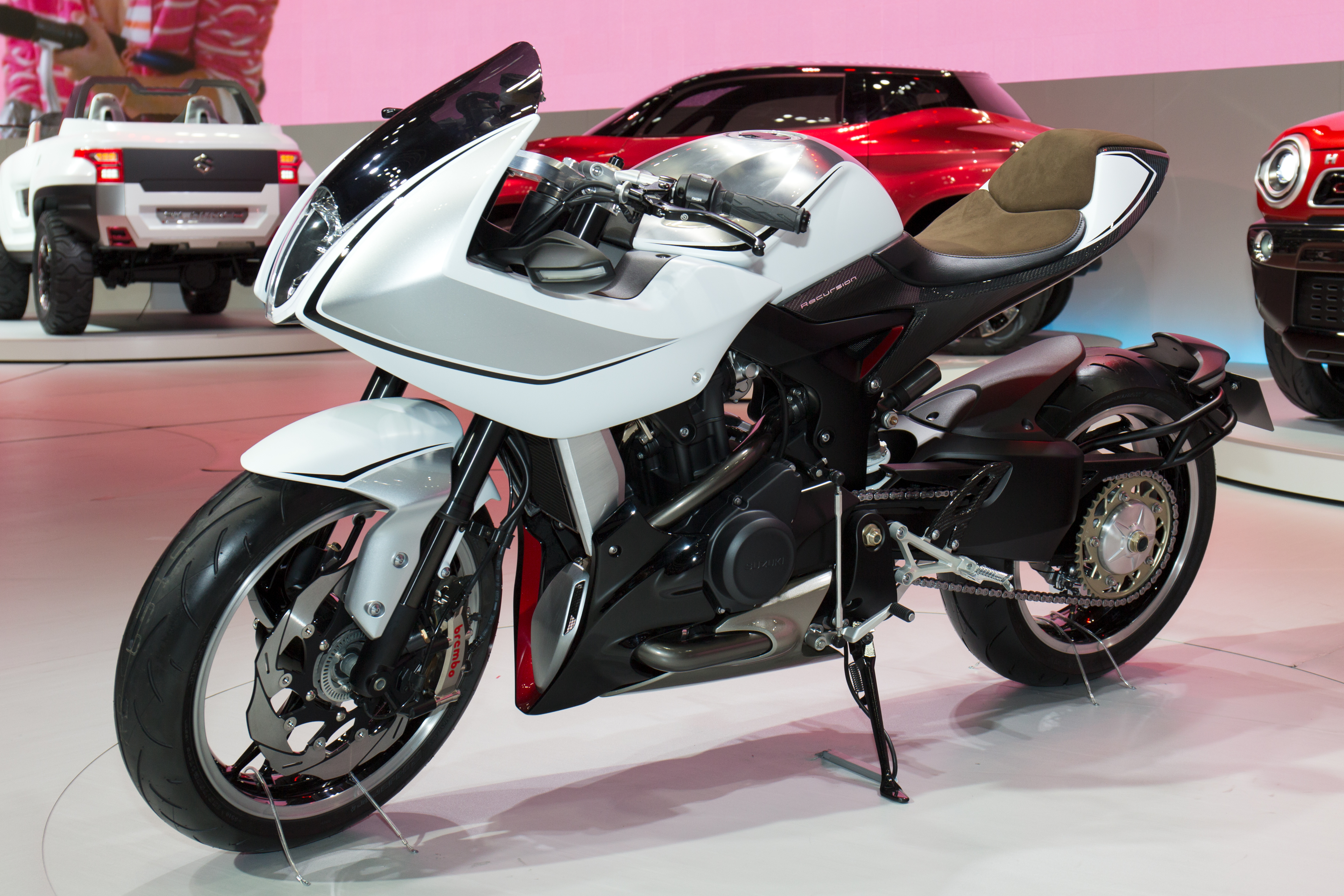
Recursion

The Suzuki Recursion is a turbocharged concept motorcycle shown by Suzuki at the 2013 Tokyo Auto Show. The engine is a 588 cc parallel-twin with intercooled turbo and traction control system. Kevin Cameron described its power delivery in Cycle World as "the torque of a liter-bike, given across a three-times-wider band and packaged into a light middleweight", and Gizmag's Mike Hanlon compared it to a Buell V-twin.

Visordown.com said the intercooler was positioned under the saddle. It is unclear if this would be carried forward in a production motorcycle; other production models with under-tail exhausts and radiators (Benelli Tornado) have been criticized for un-ergonomic heat management. (Note: Burns 2010: "[U]ndertail exhaust and poor heat management meant 'the rider's right shin gets roasted...'") (Note: Ash 2004: "The underseat exhaust might look sexy but my backside was roasting after an hour on board...") (Note: LeSanto 2002: "[R]iding slowly up and down the main street for photos put stacks of heat into the engine, the clutch and because of that under-seat radiator the rider! The water temp hit maximum, the clutch got grabby and I sweated off several pounds. Benelli put the radiator under the seat to allow for a streamlined front end for the machine and to optimise weight distribution, but it had a difficult time keeping the temperatures in check...")

== See also ==
- Suzuki § Concept motorcycles
- Forced induction in motorcycles
