= Sportbike motorcycle drag racing =

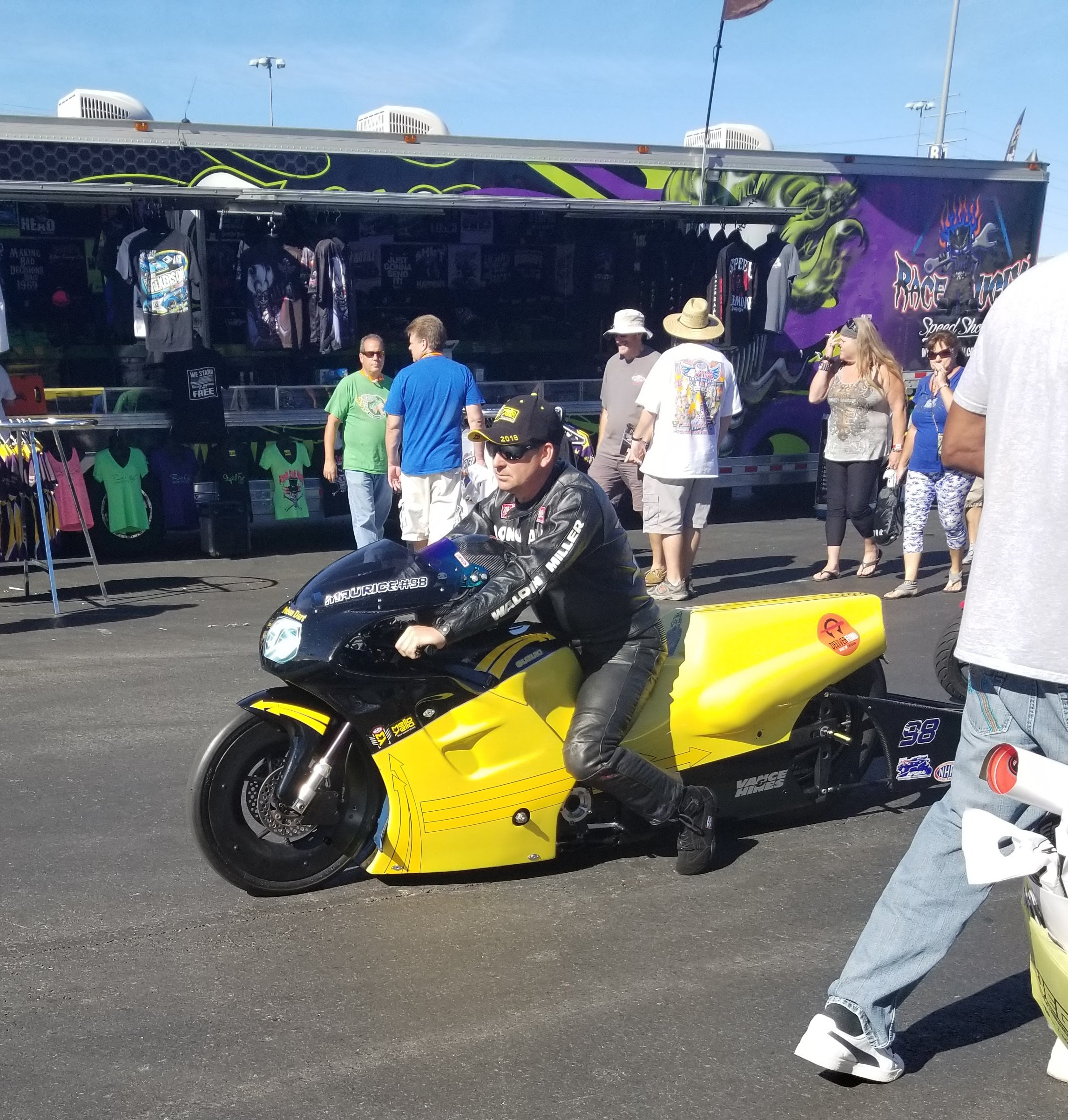
Walden Miller (2018) Z-Max Dragway at Charlotte North Carolina

Sportbike motorcycle drag racing involves racing motorcycles, often imported from Japan. Many sportbikes such as the Suzuki Hayabusa, the Kawasaki ZX-14, or the BMW S1000RR can perform a 1/4-mile drag race in the 9-second range with little to no modifications. 1/8th-mile racing is also popular in some parts of the country.

== Racing organizations ==
The largest drag racing organization is the NHRA, which has over a hundred different tracks where motorcycles can be raced in seven different divisions across the country.

AMA Dragbike is an eight race series that travels all over the county with 3 races in Georgia and a race in each of the following states: Tennessee, New Jersey, Ohio, Michigan, and Indiana. This is the most popular racing series with motorcycles, some of which travel over 250 mph in a quarter mile race. There are five racing classes dedicated to the sportbike drag racing. Some of these classes feature a bracket racing format while others are heads up racing classes where the first racer to the finish line wins. Most fans feel that the most exciting class to watch is the Pro Street class, where sportbikes can reach over 200 mph in the quarter mile.

The MiRock racing series is an all motorcycle drag racing series run at Rockingham Dragway in Rockingham, North Carolina and Maryland International Raceway in Budds Creek, Maryland. This series runs eight races a year between these two tracks. Their main focus is on sportbike motorcycle drag racing and they have eight different racing classes available by racers with the proper equipment.

== Racing classes ==
The most basic racing class is the bracket racing class, Street ET. Each motorcycle in this class must have a street tire and feature no wheelie bars. Some of these bikes have minor modifications such as having been lowered or featuring an air shifter to change gears. Each rider submits a "dial in" time before the race (the predicted time he/she will run), and the racer running the closest to their dial in and getting to the finish line first without running under their dial in wins. Reaction time is important, especially the closer a racer gets to the finals. Bracket racing is a relatively inexpensive and easy way to get into drag racing a sportbike. "This is a great class to come start in and once was the stomping grounds for many racing of the “Pro” riders today" (Series Information).

Another popular classes is "Pro Street", which features some bikes as fast as the upper six-second range, street tire motorcycles with no wheelie-bars traveling down the track at over 200 mph. "The Pro Street class is a professional heads-up class that contests the ultimate in street-legal motorcycles" (Series Information). These bikes appear similar to ordinary streetbike, but have a vast array of performance-enhancing products, turbo or nitrous oxide for example. The Pro Street motorcycles are often just as fast as a pro stock motorcycle but resemble more of a street appearance with working headlights and taillights along with street tires.
