= Kevin Cameron =

Kevin Cameron may refer to:

- Kevin Cameron (baseball) (born 1979), American baseball pitcher
- Kevin Cameron (politician) (born 1958), Oregon county commissioner and former state representative
- Kevin Cameron (journalist), motorcycle journalist and technical editor for Cycle World magazine
- Kevin Cameron, guitarist of Australian metalcore bands I Killed the Prom Queen and In Trenches
