= Turbocharged petrol engine =

Type of petrol engine

Turbochargers have been used on various petrol engines since 1962, in order to obtain greater power or torque output for a given engine displacement.

Most turbocharged petrol engines use a single turbocharger; however, twin-turbo configurations are also often used.

In motor racing, turbochargers were used in various forms of motorsport in the 1970s and 1980s. Since the mid-2010s, turbocharging has returned to several motor racing categories, such as Formula One and the World Rally Championship.

Several motorcycles in the late 1970s and early 1980s were produced with turbocharged engines.

== History ==
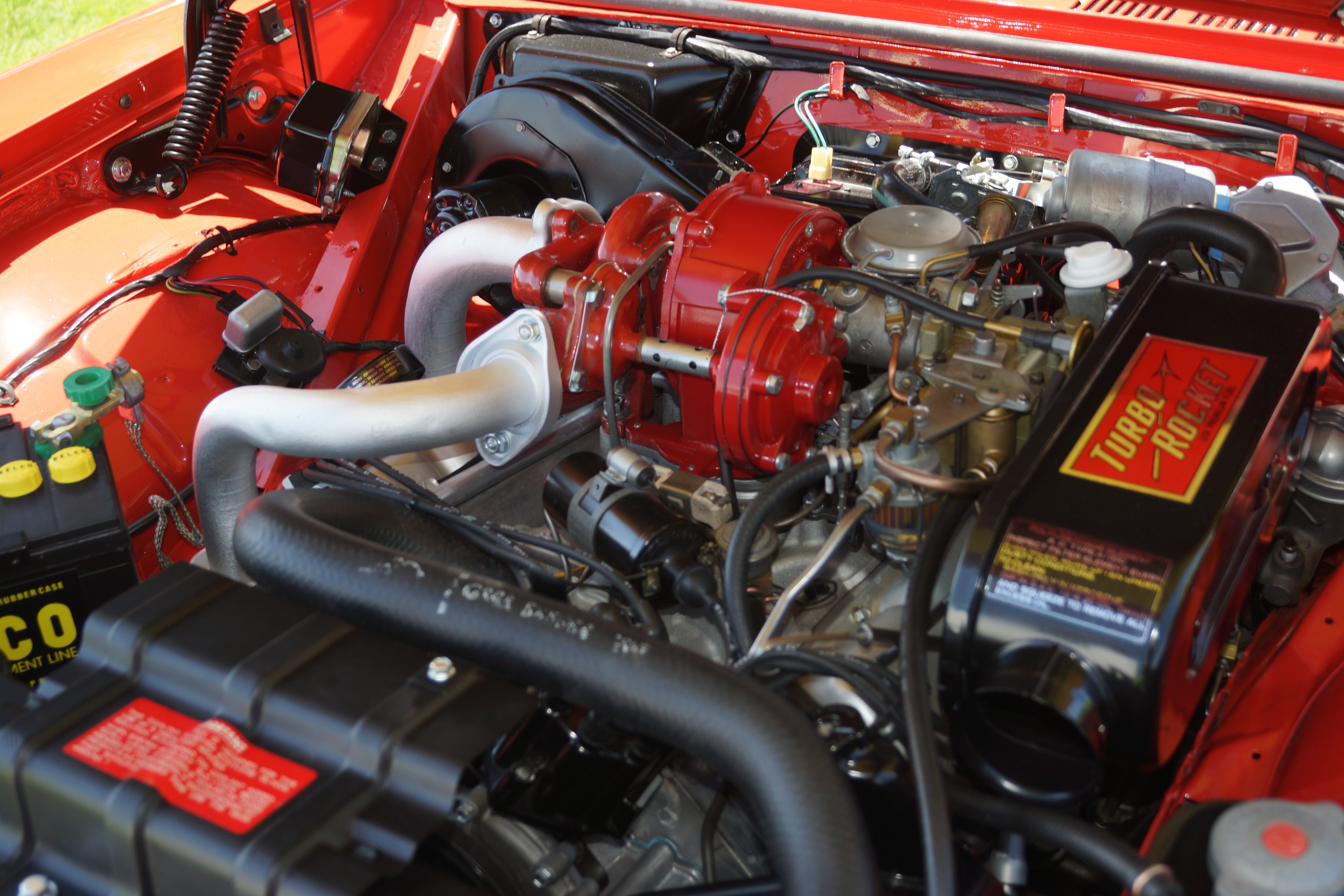
1962 Turbo Jetfire engine

- 1962: The first turbocharged production car engine was the Oldsmobile Turbo Jetfire used in the Oldsmobile Jetfire. A Garrett AiResearch turbocharger with integral wastegate was used. Power was significantly increased over the naturally aspirated engine, but reliability was poor and the production of this engine ceased in 1963. One month after the release of the turbocharged Oldsmobile, a turbocharged version of the Chevrolet Turbo-Air 6 engine was introduced in the Chevrolet Corvair Monza Spyder. This engine did not use a wastegate. Production of the turbocharged Corvair engine ran until 1966.
- 1965: Beginning this year a turbocharged version of the "Comanche" 154 cubic inch, inline slant four cylinder engine was an option in the International Scout. This engine developed 83 kW (111 hp) at 4,000 rpm and 225 N⋅m (166 lb⋅ft) at 3,200 rpm and was available until 1967.
- 1973: The next mass-produced turbocharged car was the BMW 2002 Turbo, introduced at the 1973 Frankfurt motor show and featuring a 2.0 L (120 cu in) four-cylinder engine. Due to excessive turbo lag, safety concerns and the 1973/1974 oil crisis, the 2002 Turbo was discontinued in 1974.
- 1974: At the height of the oil crisis, the Porsche 911 Turbo was introduced, becoming the fastest mass-produced car at the time. The Porsche 911 has been available with a turbocharged engine for the majority of the years since 1974.
- 1977: The Saab 99 model begins Saab's long run of turbocharged passenger cars.
- 1978: The "LD5" version of the Buick V6 engine marks the return of turbocharging to cars produced in the United States.
- 1978-present: Many manufacturers have produced turbocharged cars. Since the early-2010s, many European cars have switched to smaller, turbocharged engines. This trend has since spread to manufacturers from other regions.

== Multiple turbochargers ==
=== Parallel configuration ===
A common arrangement for twin-turbo engines, especially on V engines is a parallel configuration. This arrangement uses two identically sized turbos, each fed by a separate set of exhaust streams from the engine. Having two smaller turbos produce the same aggregate amount of boost as a larger single turbo allows them to reach their optimal rpm more quickly, thus improving boost delivery.

=== Sequential configuration ===
Another twin-turbo arrangement commonly used on car engines is a sequential configuration, where one turbo is active across the entire rev range of the engine and the other activates at higher rpm. Below this rpm, both exhaust and air inlet of the secondary turbo are closed. Being individually smaller they have reduced lag and having the second turbo operating at a higher rpm range allows it to get to full rotational speed before it is required. Such combinations are referred to as a sequential twin-turbo. Sequential twin-turbo systems are usually more complicated than parallel twin-turbo systems because they require additional wastegate pipes and valves to control the direction of the exhaust gases.

=== Other configurations ===
Automobile manufacturers rarely use more than two turbochargers. Some exceptions are the triple-turbocharger system used by the 2012–2017 BMW N57S straight-six diesel engine, the quad-turbocharger system used by the V12 engine in the 1991–1995 Bugatti EB110 and the quad-turbocharger system used by the W16 engine in the 2005–2015 Bugatti Veyron and 2016-2024 Bugatti Chiron.

== Motorsport ==
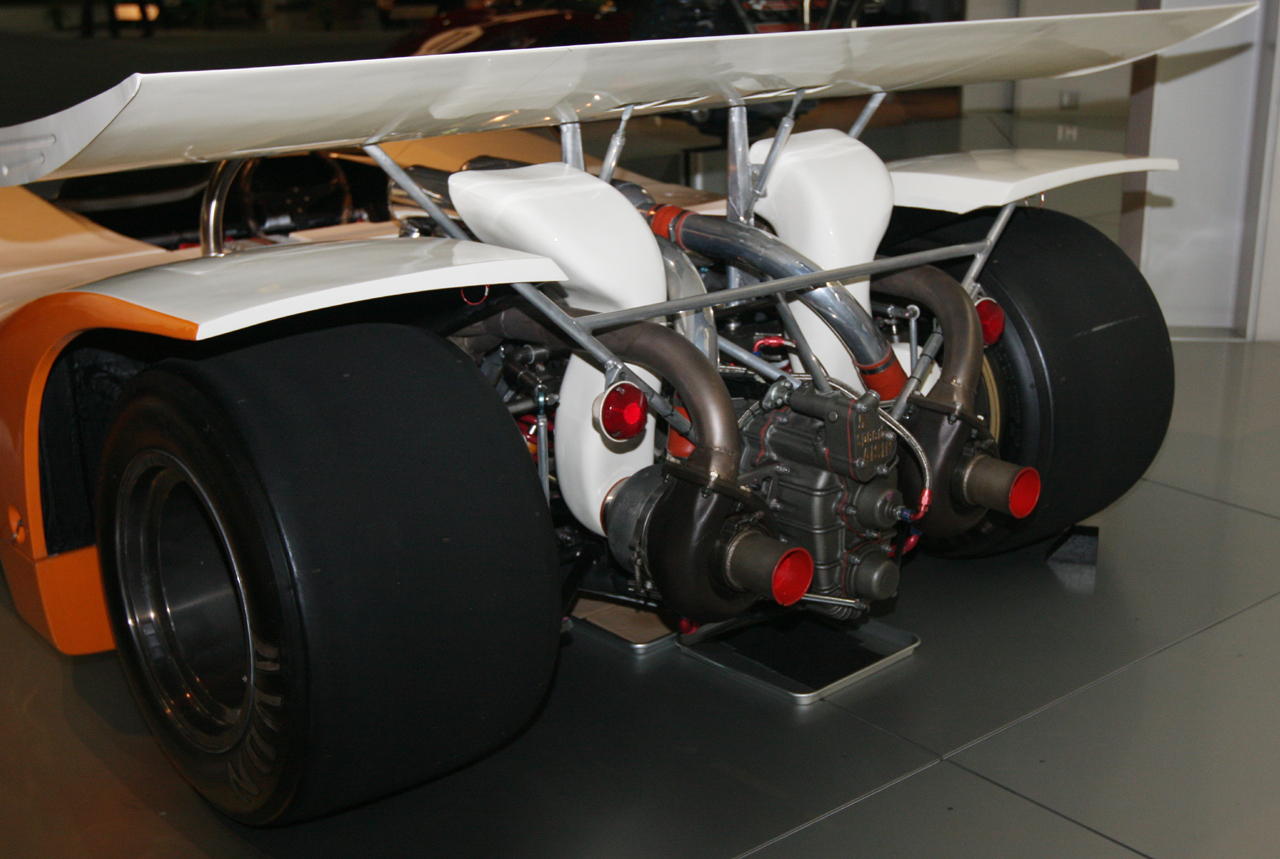
1970 Toyota 7, twin-turbocharged racing car

=== Indy car racing ===
The first turbocharged engine in motorsport was the Kurtis Kraft-Cummins Diesel driven by Fred Agabashian. He competed in the 1952 Indianapolis 500, qualifying on pole. However the turbo failed on lap 71 out of 200.

Another one of the first uses of turbocharging in motorsport was a turbocharged version of the Offenhauser engine, which first competed at the 1966 Indianapolis 500 and used a Garrett AiResearch turbocharger. This engine won the 1968 Indianapolis 500 and power outputs of over 750 kW (1,000 hp) were achieved in 1973.

=== Sports car racing ===
In 1972, the Porsche 917/10K became the first turbocharged car to win the Can-Am series. The 917/10K was powered by a turbocharged flat-twelve engine producing up to 820 kW (1,100 hp).

=== Formula 1 ===
Ferrari 126C4/M2 (1984)
1984 Ferrari 126C4/M2, a 1.5 litre turbocharged V6 engine used in Formula One

In Formula One, the original "Turbo Era" lasted from the 1977 season until the 1988 season. During this era, Renault, Honda, BMW, and Ferrari produced engines with a capacity of 1,500 cc (92 cu in), and were capable of producing from 380 to 1,120 kW (510 to 1,500 hp) over this period. The first turbocharged Formula One car was the Renault RS01, however early engines often suffered from reliability problems. By the mid-1980s, turbocharged engines dominated Formula One, until they were banned after the 1988 season.

Turbochargers returned to Formula One for the 2014 season, with turbocharged 1.6 L (98 cu in) V6 engines replacing the naturally aspirated 2.4 L (146 cu in) V8 engines that were previously used. The turbocharging combined with more powerful energy recovery systems kept the power level similar to the previous V8 engines, despite the smaller capacity and the lower rev limits.

=== Touring car racing ===
In the German Deutsche Tourenwagen Meisterschaft (DTM) racing series, the "Turbo Era" of 1985 until 1989 saw Volvo, Alfa Romeo and Ford becoming the first manufacturers to use turbocharged engines. In 1985, the Volvo 240 Turbo won the European Touring Car Championship, before turbochargers were banned at the start of 1990 season due to cost reasons.

Since the 2019 season, turbocharging has returned to DTM, with turbocharged 2.0 L (122 cu in) inline-four engines (shared with the Japanese Super GT "Class One" regulations) replacing the previous naturally aspirated 4.0 L (244 cu in) V8 engines.

=== Rally ===
During the Group B era of 1982–1986, turbocharged engines producing up to 450 kW (600 hp) dominated the World Rally Championship.

Turbocharging returned for the 2012 season and has been used since. WRC rally cars use a turbocharged 1.6 L (98 cu in) inline-four engine with a 34 mm restrictor in the air intake system.

== Motorcycles ==
Turbocharging is rarely used by manufacturers of motorcycles, with the following being the only examples of factory turbocharged motorcycles:

- 1978 Kawasaki Z1R-TC
- 1982 Honda CX 500 Turbo
- 1982–1983 Yamaha XJ 650 Seca Turbo
- 1983 Honda CX 650 Turbo
- 1983 Suzuki XN85 Turbo
- 1983–1985 Kawasaki GPZ750 Turbo
