= Suzuki Advanced Cooling System =

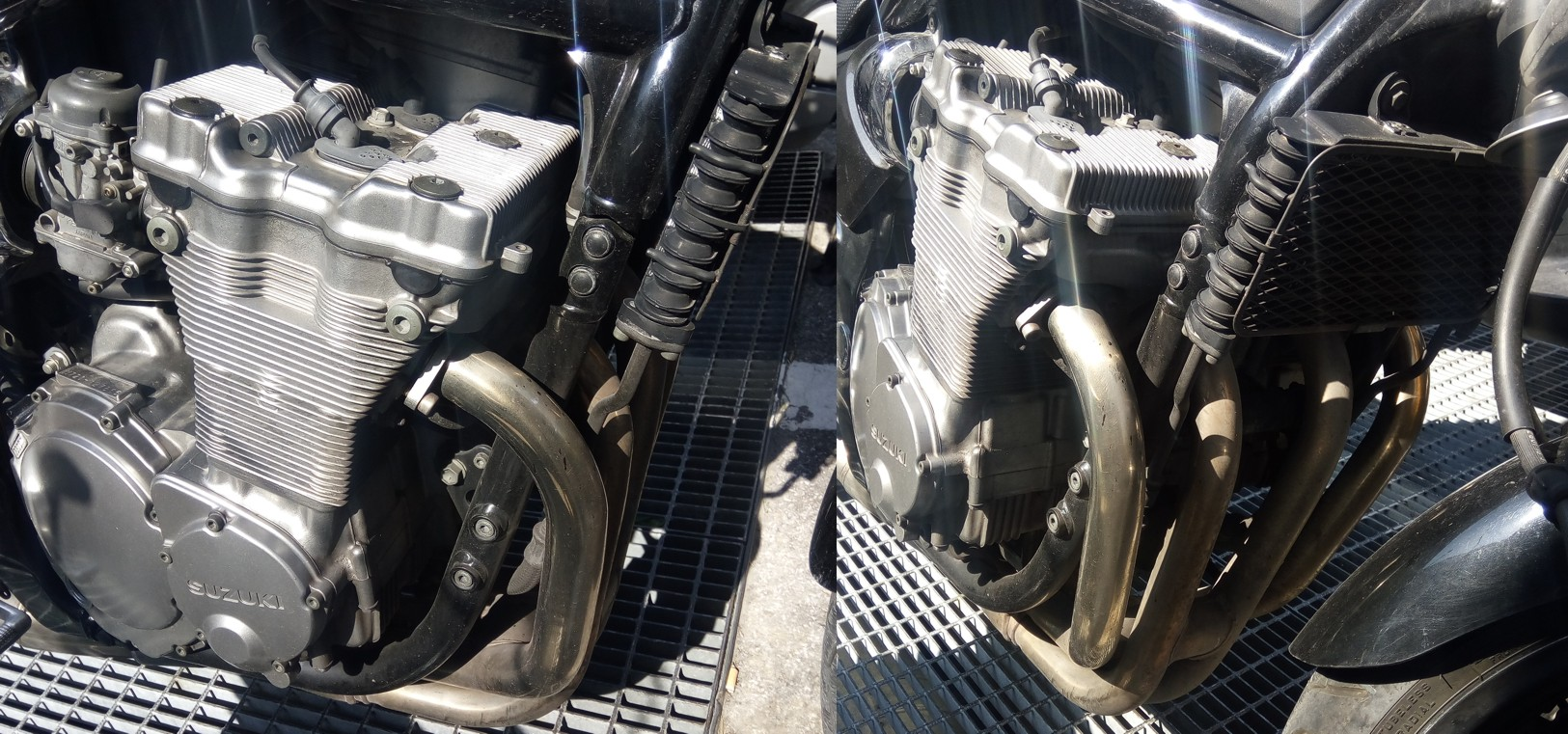

The Suzuki Advanced Cooling System (SACS) was developed by Suzuki engineer Etsuo Yokouchi in the early 1980s. The system was used extensively on GSX-R model bikes from 1985 through 1992. Suzuki continued to use the system in its GSF (Bandit) and GSX (GSX-F, GSX1400, Inazuma) lines until the 2006 model-year and DR650 from 1990 to present. Engines using the SACS system were generally regarded as being very durable.

== Development ==
While addressing reliability issues in Suzuki's only turbo charged bike, the XN85, the SACS system was first conceived by Etsuo Yokouchi, who looked to World War II–era aircraft for inspiration. Like air-cooled motorcycles, radial engines used in many early aircraft suffered from heat and reliability issues. To overcome these problems, aircraft engineers often used oil jets aimed at the bottom of an engine's pistons to carry away excess heat. Following their example, Yokouchi decided to apply the approach to motorcycles.

When the GSX-R entered development, Suzuki set a goal of 100 horsepower (75 kW) for a 750 engine and, due to known heat-related problems in high-power air-cooled engines, determined that air cooling alone would not be sufficient. Therefore, the SACS system was applied to the bike's design and was eventually carried over to all larger GSX-Rs. The final GSX-R SACS engine appeared on the Suzuki GSX-R1100 in 1992, later bikes featured water cooling.

Suzuki Advanced Cooling System Badge from a 1991 GSX-R 1100

== Mechanics ==
The SACS system uses high volumes of engine oil aimed at strategic points of the engine, like the top of the combustion chamber, which are not typically well served by air cooling alone. In order to provide enough oil for both cooling and lubrication, the system uses a double-chamber oil pump, using the high-pressure side for lubrication of the parts (crankshaft, connecting rods, valvetrain), while the low-pressure, high-volume side provides oil to the cooling and filtering circuit. The oil removes heat from hot engine parts through direct contact, is pumped away and subsequently routed through the oil filter, followed by routing through an oil cooler before being returned to the main sump.
