= Suzuki XN85 =

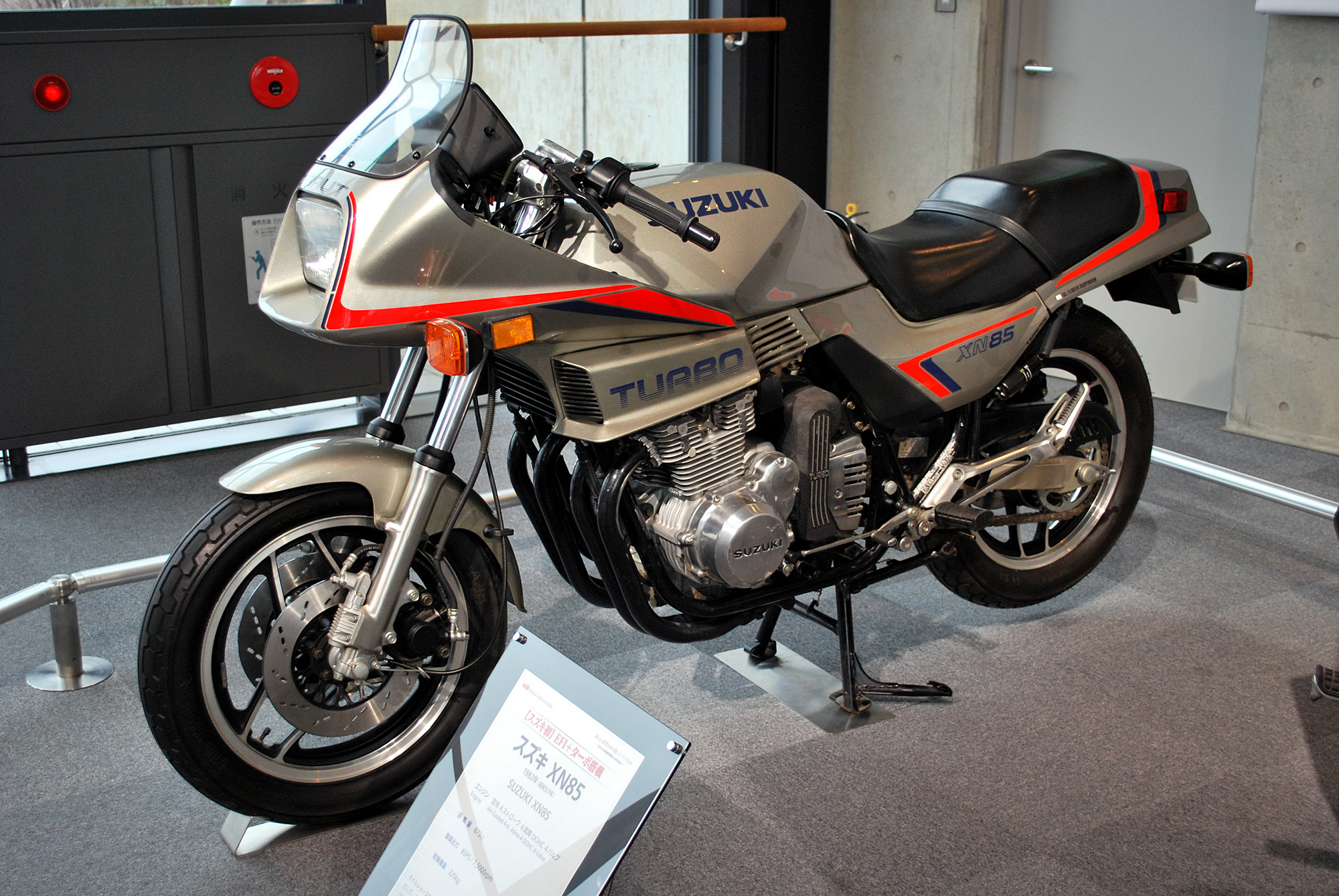
- Manufacturer: Suzuki
- Parent company: Suzuki
- Production: 1983
- Successor: GS750ES
- Class: Sport bike
- Engine: 673 cc (41.1 cu in), 4-stroke, transverse 4-cylinder, air/oil-cooled, DOHC, 2-valve-per-cylinder, IHI turbocharger
- Bore / stroke: 62 mm × 55.8 mm (2.44 in × 2.20 in)
- Power: 85 hp (63 kW) (claimed)
- Torque: 56.4 ft-lb @ 6,500 rpm
- Ignition type: Electronic
- Transmission: 5-speed
- Frame type: steel
- Suspension: Front - 37 mm telescopic forks with antidive units, 150 mm (5.9 in) travel Rear - Suzuki Full Floater with Kayaba Damper steel swingarm (painted silver), 105 mm (4.1 in) travel
- Brakes: 260 mm (10 in) dual disc (front); 275 mm (10.8 in) single disc (rear)
- Tires: tube-type rims 110/90H16 MichelinA48 (front); 130/90H17 MichelinM48 (rear)
- Wheelbase: 1,490 mm (58.7 in)
- Dimensions: L: 2,160 mm (85 in); W: 750 mm (30 in)
- Seat height: 762 mm (30.0 in)
- Weight: 218 kg (481 lb) (dry); 250 kg (550 lb) (wet)
- Fuel capacity: 20 L (4.4 imp gal; 5.3 US gal)

The Suzuki XN85, released in early 1983, was a turbocharged motorcycle designed as a sports bike. The name came from the claim that it produced 85 bhp, although rear wheel measurements were in the low 70s. It featured the first factory 16-inch front wheel (at least in the U.S.), previously seen only on race bikes. It also had low clip-on handlebars, rearset foot pegs, four-into-one exhaust, electronic fuel injection, and a monoshock rear suspension called the Suzuki Full Floater—the first to feature this. Its styling was derived from the Suzuki Katana.

The engine was rather tame, with boost kicking in around 5,000 rpm. The fuel-injected motor pulled strongly from that point but did not match the performance of larger sportbikes. Oil jets directed onto the bottom of the pistons improved engine cooling. Later iterations of this technique were marketed as the Suzuki Advanced Cooling System. While the XN did not have the power of other sportbikes, it had notably better handling than similar powered machines due to frame and suspension geometry. Total XN85 production was 1,153 units from 1983 to 1985. Three hundred of those were exported to the U.S., where the bike was sold only in 1983.

The XN85 was replaced shortly after its release in the U.S. by the lighter and cheaper GS750ES.

== See also ==
- Turbochargers in motorcycles
