= Japanese Big Four =

Motorcycle manufacturing companies

The Japanese Big Four are the large motorcycle manufacturing companies of Japan:

- Honda, which produces motorcycles since 1946
- Suzuki, which produces motorcycles since 1952
- Kawasaki, which produces motorcycles since 1954
- Yamaha, which produces motorcycles since 1955

== Sources ==
- Pashley, Tony (2008), How to Build Motorcycle-engined Racing Cars, Veloce Publishing, ISBN 9781845841232, "Competitive engines are manufactured by the big four Japanese companies: Honda, Kawasaki, Suzuki, and Yamaha."
- "Harley talks to Big Four, Looks to Triumph", Cycle World, 23 (1), January 1984, "The enactment of the import tariff ... hasn't kept the two sides -- Harley-Davidson and Japan's Big Four manufacturers--from talking to each other... [Harley has] met with representatives of Honda, Yamaha, Suzuki and Kawasaki to discuss possible alternatives to the tariff."
- Zuehlke, Jeffrey (2007), Supercross, Motor Mania Series, Lerner Publishing Group, ISBN 978-0-8225-9014-9
