= Motorcycle drag racing =

Type of motor racing for motorcycles

Motorcycle drag racing (also known as "sprints") involves two participants lining up at a dragstrip with a signaled starting line. Upon the starting signal, the riders accelerate down a 1/4 mile (400 m), 1,000 feet (300 m), or 1/8 mile (200 m) long, two lane, straight paved track where their elapsed time and terminal speed are recorded. The rider to reach the finish line first is the winner. The best-known form of motorcycle drag racing is the Pro Stock Bike category, although several other categories exist, including Top Fuel and Pro Street.

Motorcycles in the Top Fuel category are fueled by nitro methane and can make nearly 1,500 horsepower, which like their car counterparts, race to 1,000 feet (in effect since 2024 for NHRA events). From a standing start they can cover the first 60 feet in less than a second and can reach 200 mph in less than eighth-mile or 660 feet.

The current record is held by Top Fuel Veteran Larry "Spiderman" McBride who covered the thousand foot distance in 4.797 seconds with a terminal velocity of 248.71 MPH on September 21, 2025, at zMax Dragway during the Carolina Nationals.

== UK Sprinting ==
The UK National Sprint Association was formed in 1958. The president was Donald Campbell until his death in 1967, succeeded by former Vincent employee and sprint-record holder George Brown, who retired from sport in 1966 on reaching the 55 age-limit for the ACU competition licence. Brown's machines included the V twin Vincent-engined, normally-aspirated Nero, and the supercharged version Super Nero.

Sprinting occurred on disused and re-purposed airstrips, and on a few sea-front promenades, generally with one set of timing equipment, for the 1/4-mile distance, although some used 1/8-mile, as still happens at the Ramsey seafront as the Ramsey Sprint, part of added attractions during the Isle of Man TT and Manx Grand Prix events. Santa Pod Raceway was the first permanent drag-strip established in UK and Europe in 1966. Writing in his 1970 book, Peter Carrick stated:

Though basically similar, sprinting and drag racing have essential differences. Sprinting is a race against the clock, even if other competitors are taking part at the same time. Drag racing is more of a contest, often between a couple of racers.

Where a time was one-way only, any record could be regarded as strip-only, as for official recognition of world and national records two qualifying runs had to be completed in opposite-directions within one-hour, to negate the effect of wind, with an average time resulting.

Writing in 1974, Motorcycle News contributor Jim Reynolds stated: "This is drag racing, a young sport in England, but growing faster than any other".

== Gallery ==
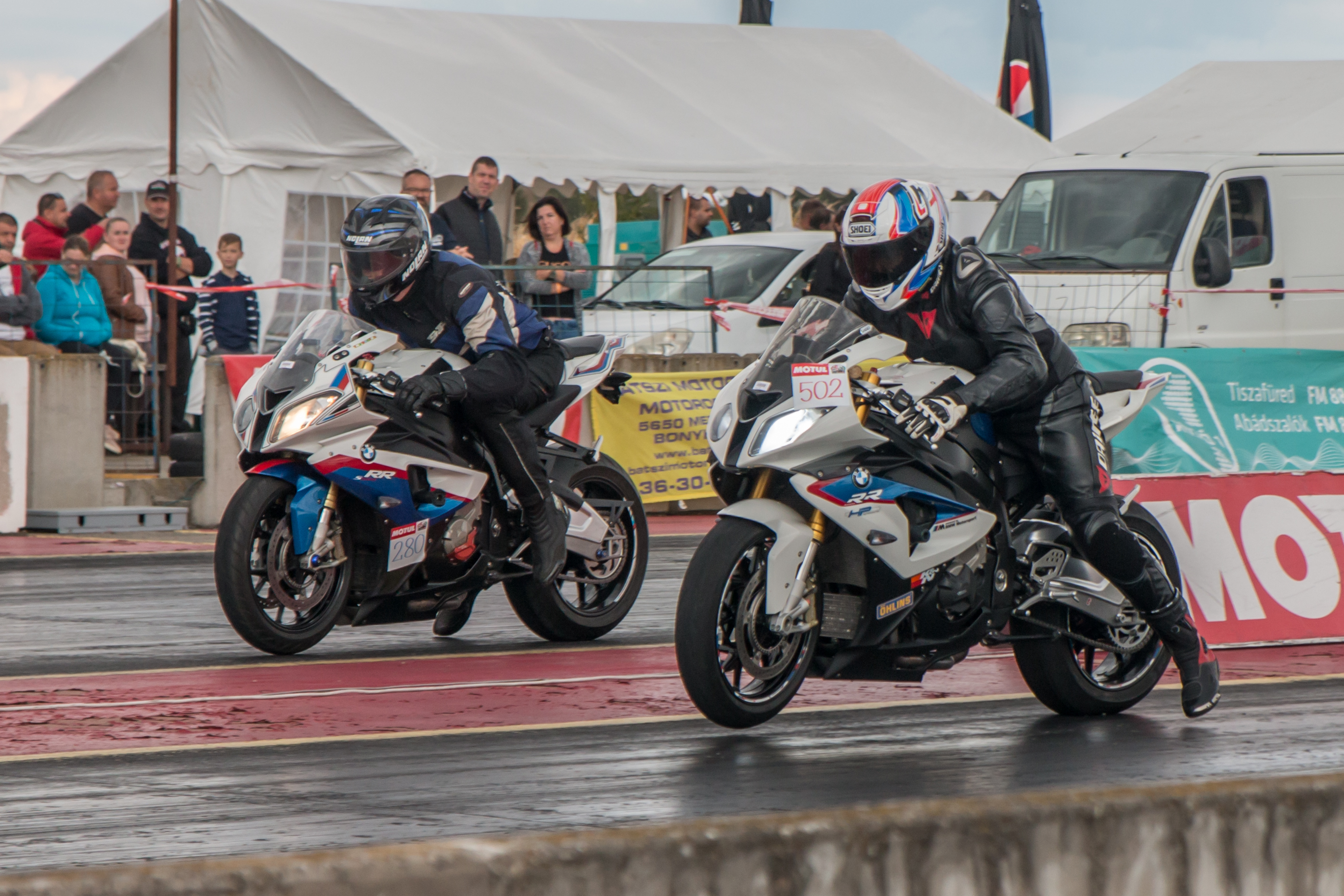
Two BMW S 1000 RR motorbikes at a drag race

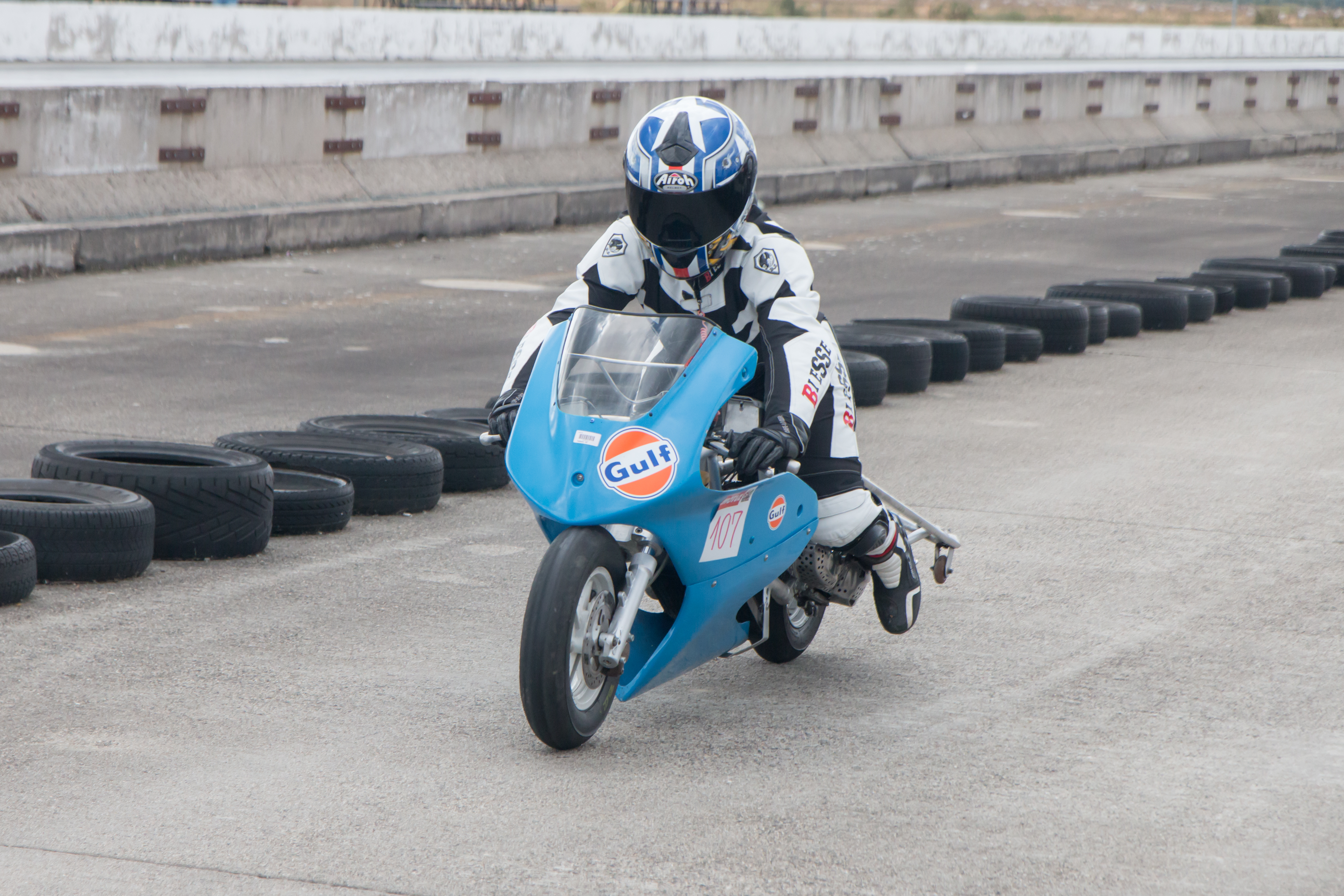
A two-stroke motorcycle designed for drag racing

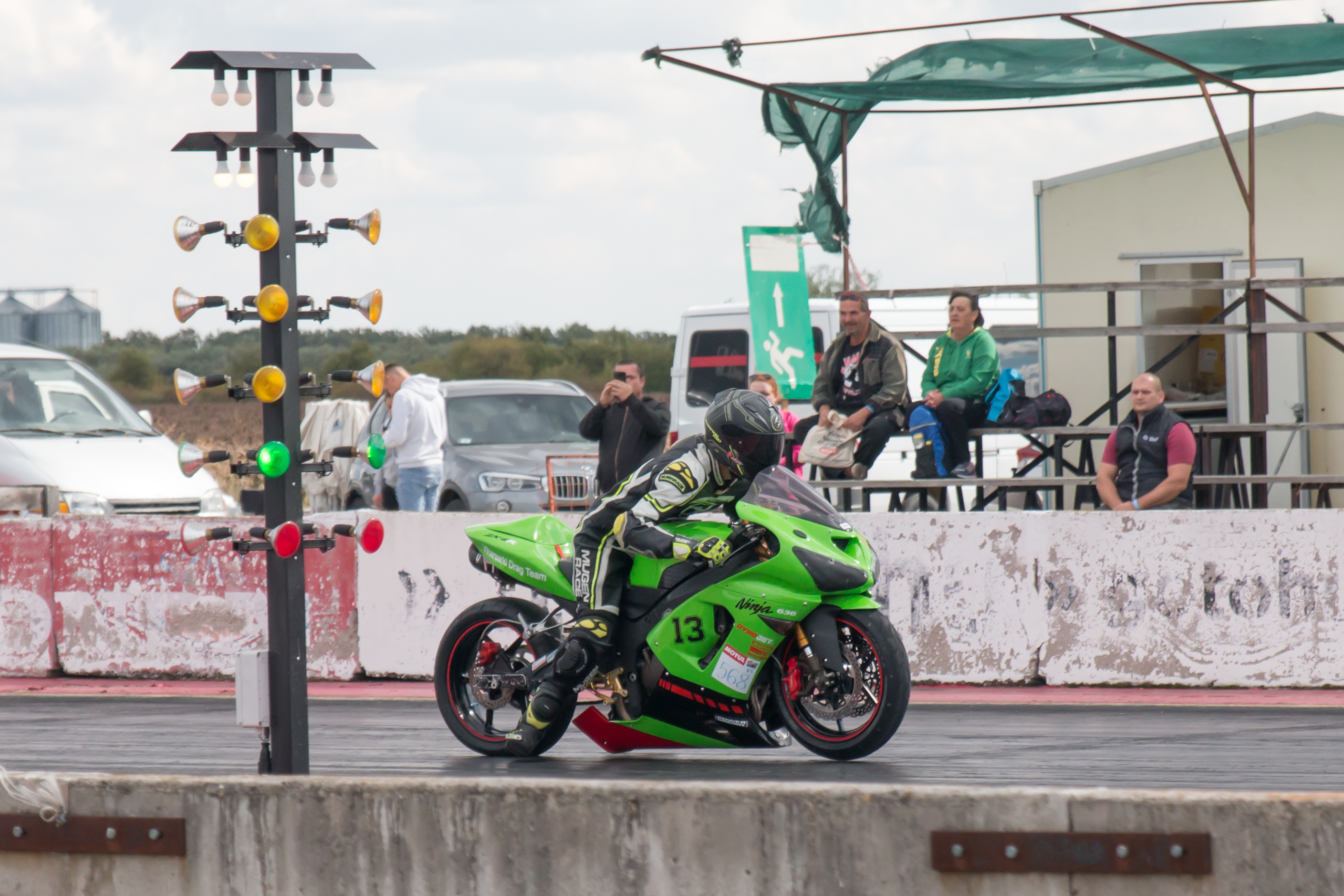
A Kawasaki Ninja ZX-6R at the start

== See also ==
- Motorcycle sport
- Sportbike motorcycle drag racing
- Drag racing
- Top Fuel
