= Kevin Cameron (journalist) =

Kevin Cameron has been an editor at Cycle World magazine since 1991, before which he was an editor at Cycle for almost twenty years, and a race tuner from the early 1970s through the 1980s. He is also an author of many books on motorcycles specializing in performance and engineering. Cameron is a graduate of Harvard University, where he studied physics.

== Bibliography ==
- Kevin Cameron (2013). Classic Motorcycle Race Engines: Expert Technical Analysis of the World's Great Power Units. Haynes Publishing. ISBN 978-1844259946.
- Gorr, Eric; Cameron, Kevin (2011). Four-Stroke Motocross and Off-Road Motorcycle Performance Handbook. Voyageur. ISBN 9780760340004.
- Kevin Cameron (contributor) (2010). The Devil Can Ride: The World's Best Motorcycle Writing. Motorbooks. ISBN 978-0760334775.
- Kevin Cameron (2009). Top Dead Center 2: Racing and Wrenching with Cycle World's Kevin Cameron. Foreword by Erik Buell. Motorbooks. ISBN 978-0760336083.
- Kevin Cameron (2009). The Grand Prix Motorcycle: The Official History. David Bull Publishing. ISBN 978-1935007012.
- Kevin Cameron (2007). Top Dead Center: The Best of Kevin Cameron from Cycle World Magazine. Motorbooks. ISBN 978-0760327272.
- Kevin Cameron (2005). Superbikes: The History of High-Performance Motorcycles. Motorbooks. ISBN 978-0760310922.
- Kevin Cameron (1998). Sportbike Performance Handbook. Motorbooks. ISBN 9780760302293.
