= Suzuki Katana =

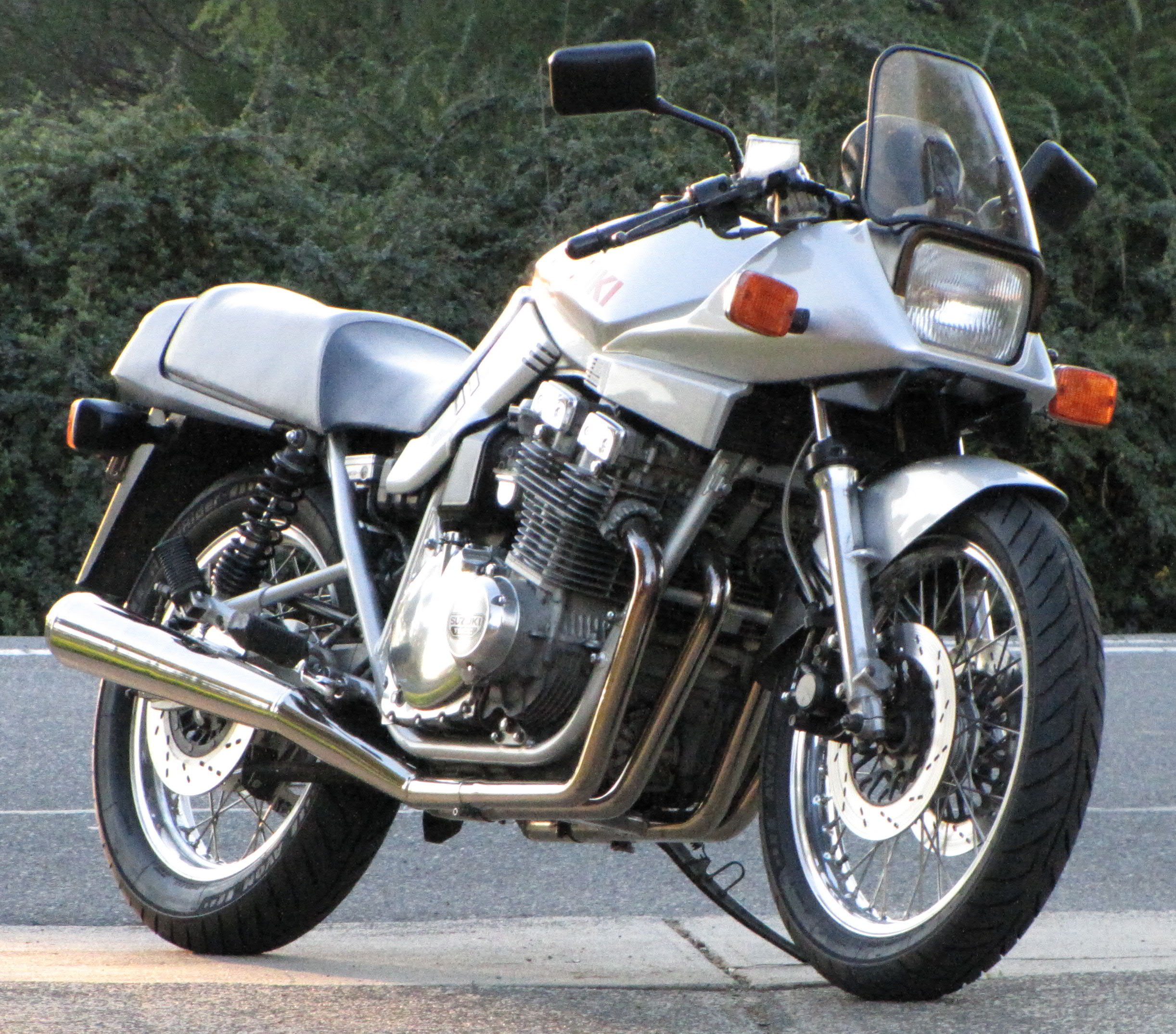
- Suzuki GSX1100S Katana
- Manufacturer: Suzuki
- Production: 1981–2006; 2019–present
- Class: Sports

The Suzuki Katana is a street motorcycle sold between 1981 and 2006 and then since 2019. It was designed in 1979–1980 by Target Design of Germany for Suzuki.

The Katana name was later applied to a range of in-house styled sport touring motorcycles in North America through the 2006 model year and, starting at the turn of the millennium, a line of 50 cc scooters in Europe.

== History ==
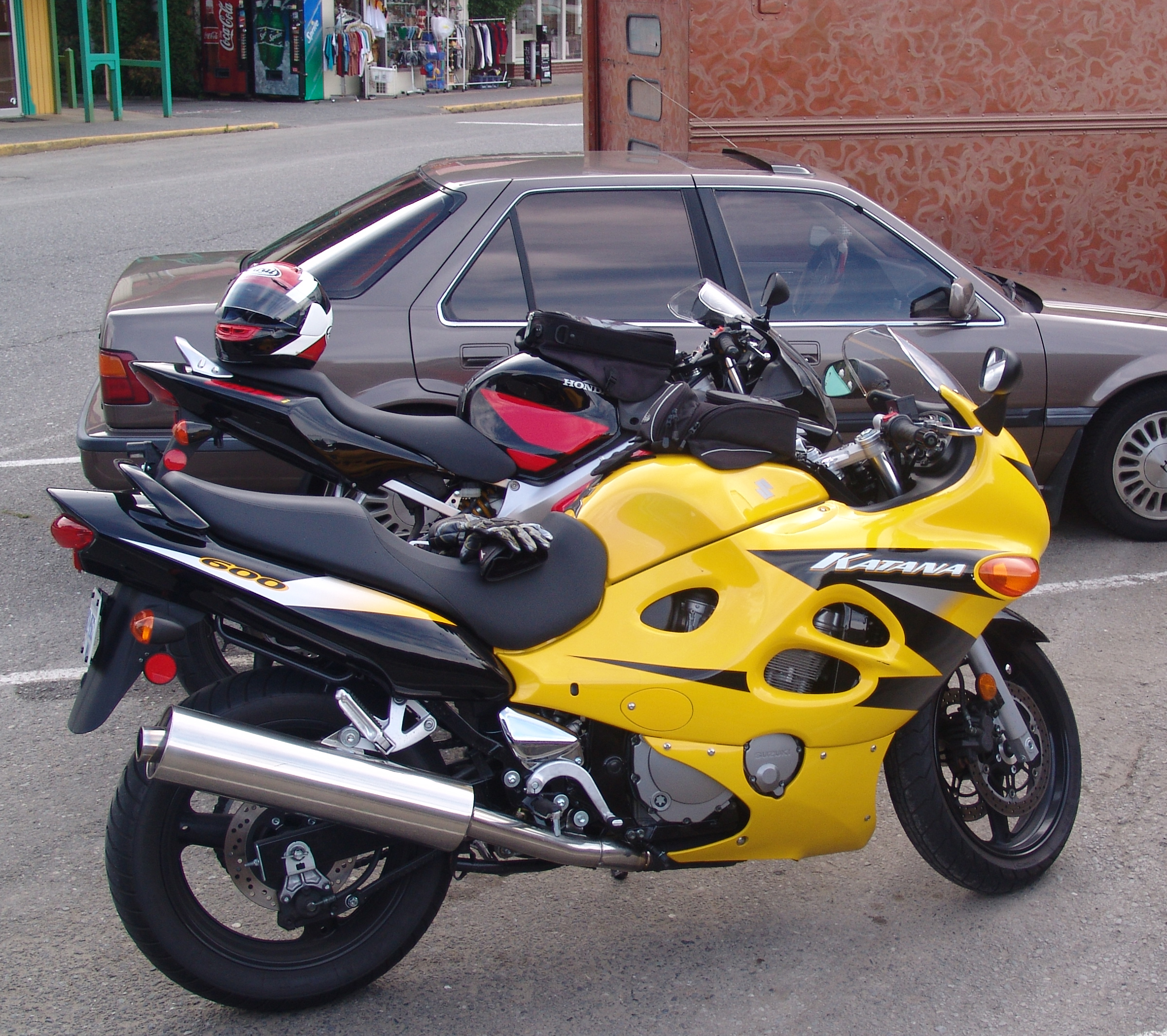
Suzuki GSX 600F

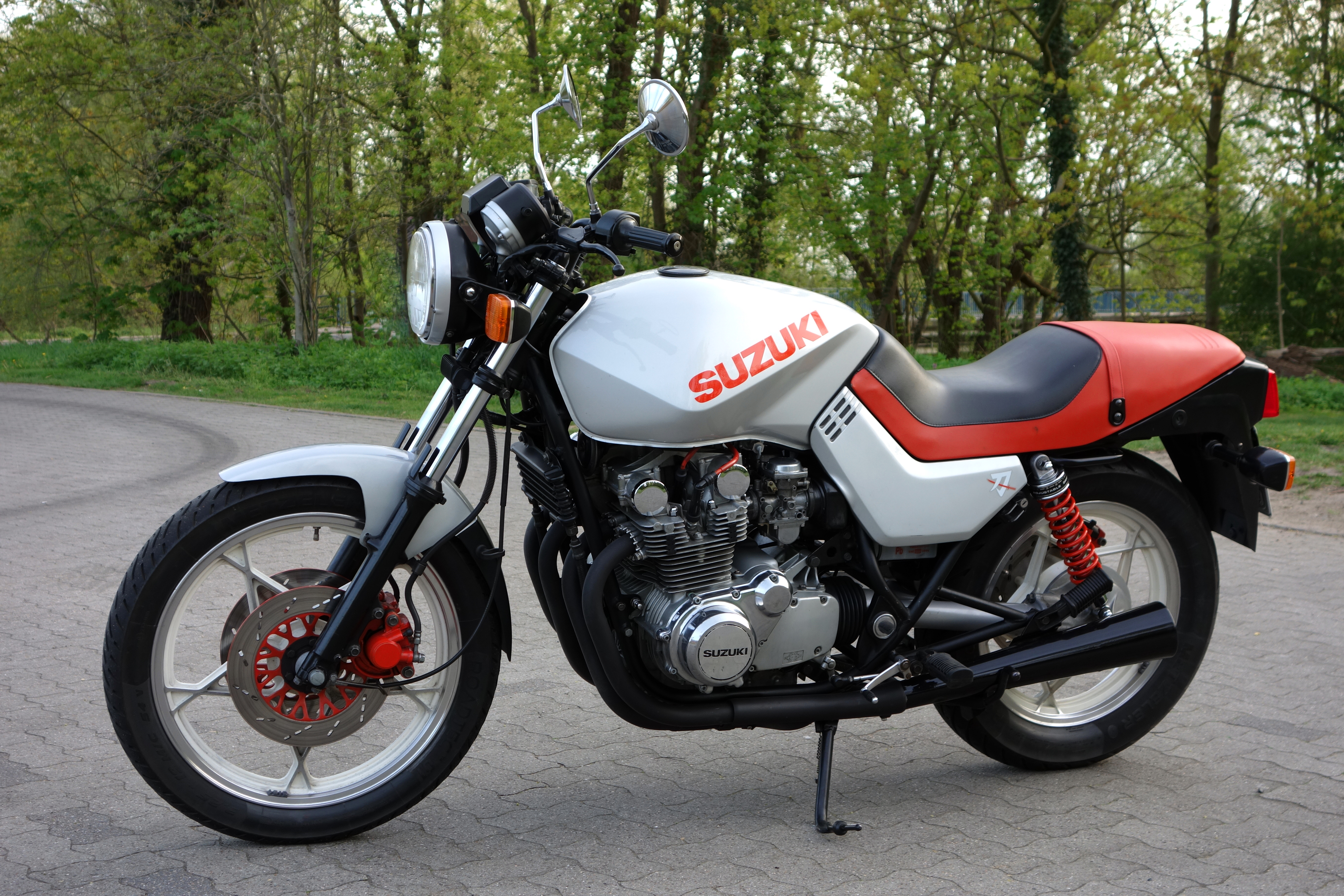
Suzuki GS650G

Under a contract with Suzuki, a three-man team at Target Design worked to update the motorbike's image. The team consisted of Jan Fellstrom, Hans-Georg Kasten, and the leader Hans Muth, ex-chief of styling for BMW, who had done much to modernise the image of the venerable Bavarian Boxer Twin. After several design variants, the ED1 and ED2 versions ("ED" for "European Design") were revealed to the public in 1980. They remained in production until 1985, when all the original model Katanas were discontinued. The new styling set a tone for many in-house designed Suzuki machines for some years to come.

=== ED1 ===
The original design was a 650 cc (40 cu in) model called the ED1. The unfaired ED1 design featured a tall, sculpted fuel tank, with curves and straight edges that merged the tank with a concave seat flanked by angular side panels. This meant that the rider essentially sat more in the motorcycle than on it (as was the norm). The ED1 design would be modified for production as the GS550M Katana, and later the GS650G Katana.

=== ED2 ===
The shark-like faired ED2 was a more radical design which incorporated favorable aerodynamics, with a special emphasis placed on high-speed stability, and was repeatedly wind tunnel tested in Italy. The same generalized design forms had already been used early in 1979 for Target's MV Agusta "Prova" concept. The 1,100 cc (67 cu in) ED2 would form the prototype for the larger 16-valve GSX1100S, GSX1000S, and GSX750S.

== Design Philosophy ==
"Muth characterizes the Suzuki Katana by what he calls its dramatic “flyline,” melding five key components into stylistic and aerodynamic unity: headlight, fuel tank, seat, and front and rear fenders. Central to the Katana's unique identity is its “V-shaped gas tank,” describing the way the tank narrows toward the rider and diverges toward the front of the bike. Muth's design was rendered in silver—like the sword. Originally, it had no windshield—that was Suzuki's requirement. On the side cover Muth added the Japanese character for the katana sword, interleaved with a red image of the same sword. “The sword first serves as a weapon, but a katana also has a mythological meaning in Japan,” Muth said when he presented the design to Osamu Suzuki. “If you don’t treat it right, its sharpness can be lethal. The same is true for a motorcycle.

== Production ==
The production 16-valve Katanas of 1981 differed only slightly from the prototype; changes included a small wind deflector screen, paired mufflers, and black accent paint on the front fender and airbox covers. Target's design philosophy—keeping components compact and close-fitting—was applied to all areas of the bike's design to reduce production costs, weight, and number of components required. Examples include the overlapping dials on the instrument cluster, and the offset fuel cap, which allowed for a clean continuous seam weld on the tank.

Upon the GSX1100S Katana's release in late 1980, Suzuki claimed it to be the fastest mass-production motorcycle in the world, ensuring that its new looks were matched by unprecedented performance levels. In comparative track testing Cycle Canada Magazine recorded a top speed of 237 km/h (147 mph) for the Suzuki 1100 Katana against 227 km/h (141 mph) for the standard GSX1100E. The next fastest tested was the 82 Kawasaki GPZ1100 at 225 km/h (140 mph) followed by the Laverda Mirage 1200 222 km/h (138 mph), Yamaha XJ650 Turbo 207 km/h (129 mph), Ducati 900SS 204 km/h (127 mph) and the Honda CX500 Turbo 203 km/h (126 mph)

So radical was the design departure from previous mass-market cycles that most major motorcycle magazines of the era thought the design would not appeal to the masses. Nevertheless, the Katana was a sales success, and it had a lasting impact on motorcycle design. Portions of the design ethos are still visible in many current sport bikes, including the faired-in seat and tank.

== Factory variants ==
Several variants of the 1982 (Z model year) Katana 1100SZ were produced by Suzuki to support racing.

=== GSX1000SZ ===
The GSX1000SZ (circa 1981) was a 998cc variant of the GSX1100SZ produced in sufficient numbers to homologate the bike as a production machine that was eligible for racing modification under the then-current international superbike racing rules (which included a 1000 cc displacement limit). The GSX1000SZ had frame serial numbers beginning with GS10X-500001~, and were fitted by the factory with a performance inlet camshaft (part 12711–49201) paired with the same exhaust camshaft as the standard GSX1100SZ (part 12700–45820). The 1000SZ also sported round-slide, oval bore Mikuni VM32SS carburetors and was often fitted with optional wire wheels, which were lighter and—with an 18" rear—allowed tire choices more suitable for the track.

=== GSX1100SXZ ===
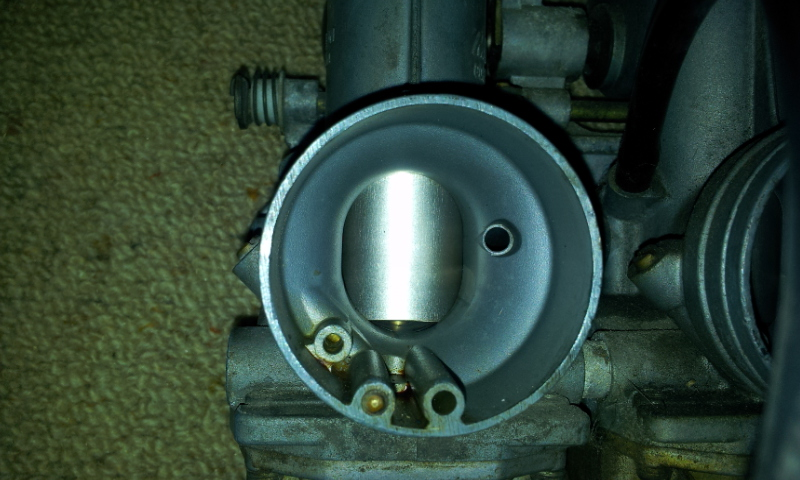
Mikuni VM32SS carburetor in a GSX1000SXZ

The GSX1100SXZ "Wire-Wheeler" was an even rarer and peculiarly southern-hemisphere factory-built variant of the standard Katana 1100SZ. Faced with the single-seat Honda CB1100R, which on paper looked likely to be the dominant machine in the upcoming local production racing series, the New Zealand Suzuki distributor at the time asked Suzuki for a new, upgraded machine to beat the Honda. Suzuki responded by building 20 units of the New Zealand E27-spec GSX1100SXZ. During this period, Suzuki sales were at an all-time high in New Zealand (with around 42% market share) due in large part to Suzuki's racing successes. In 1981, Kiwi Suzuki rider Graeme Crosby had finished fifth in the World 500cc championship and successfully defended his TT Formula One title. The E27 SXZ was fitted with wire wheels, more powerful GS1100GZ front brakes, Mikuni round-slide oval-bore VM32SS carburettors, larger 33mm bore mufflers (same as fitted to the previous Castrol 6 Hour special, the GSX1100T), performance camshafts (thought most likely to be Yoshimura profiles as Pops Yoshimura was building Suzuki superbikes and TT machines for competition during this period), braided brake lines, and an extra set of bronze sintered clutch plates. Twenty units of the E27 were delivered to South Pacific Suzuki distributors, as 20 units was the minimum required to homologate the machines as production motorcycles rather than racing specials under the rules of the New Zealand Autocycle Union (then the governing body for motorcycle sport in New Zealand). The GSX1100SXZ was crowned the overall 1981/1982 NZ National Production Champion (with riders Dave Hiscock, Neville Hiscock and Robert Holden), but failed to win the 1981 Castrol 6 Hour, Suzuki's only Castrol 6 Hour loss for 5 years. 25 more units of the same E27-spec SXZ machines were built by Suzuki and exported to South Africa.

Australia also received the Australian-market E24. This model received a number of modifications, including lightweight wire wheels with high-performance tires, heavier brake disks, 98 link chain and sprockets, a grab strap to the rear of the seat, a unique front fender, and mounting hardware along with alternate mirrors and a lever activated ignition safety and stop switch. The Australian machines were fitted with standard SZ engines, which received improved carburetors and a new inlet manifold. The 1100s were raced with mixed success in Australia in 1981, but rule changes for the 1982 Australian Castrol 6 Hour saw teams scrambling to find 1000cc versions. In New Zealand, the wire-wheeled bike won the 1981 National Production Championship, as well as numerous club and national races. The Katanas were rendered obsolete for racing by the release of the 'race replica' Suzuki GSX-R750. There were plans for a 1983-model year Katana 1100SXD to be produced, but it never went into production.

One pre-production unit was produced for the then-New Zealand distributor Colemans Suzuki (the bike is still owned by Rod and Carl Coleman); it had slightly higher specifications than the E27-spec SXZ. The number of SXZ bikes built by Suzuki for the New Zealand and South Africa markets was a total of 45 units.

== Other models ==
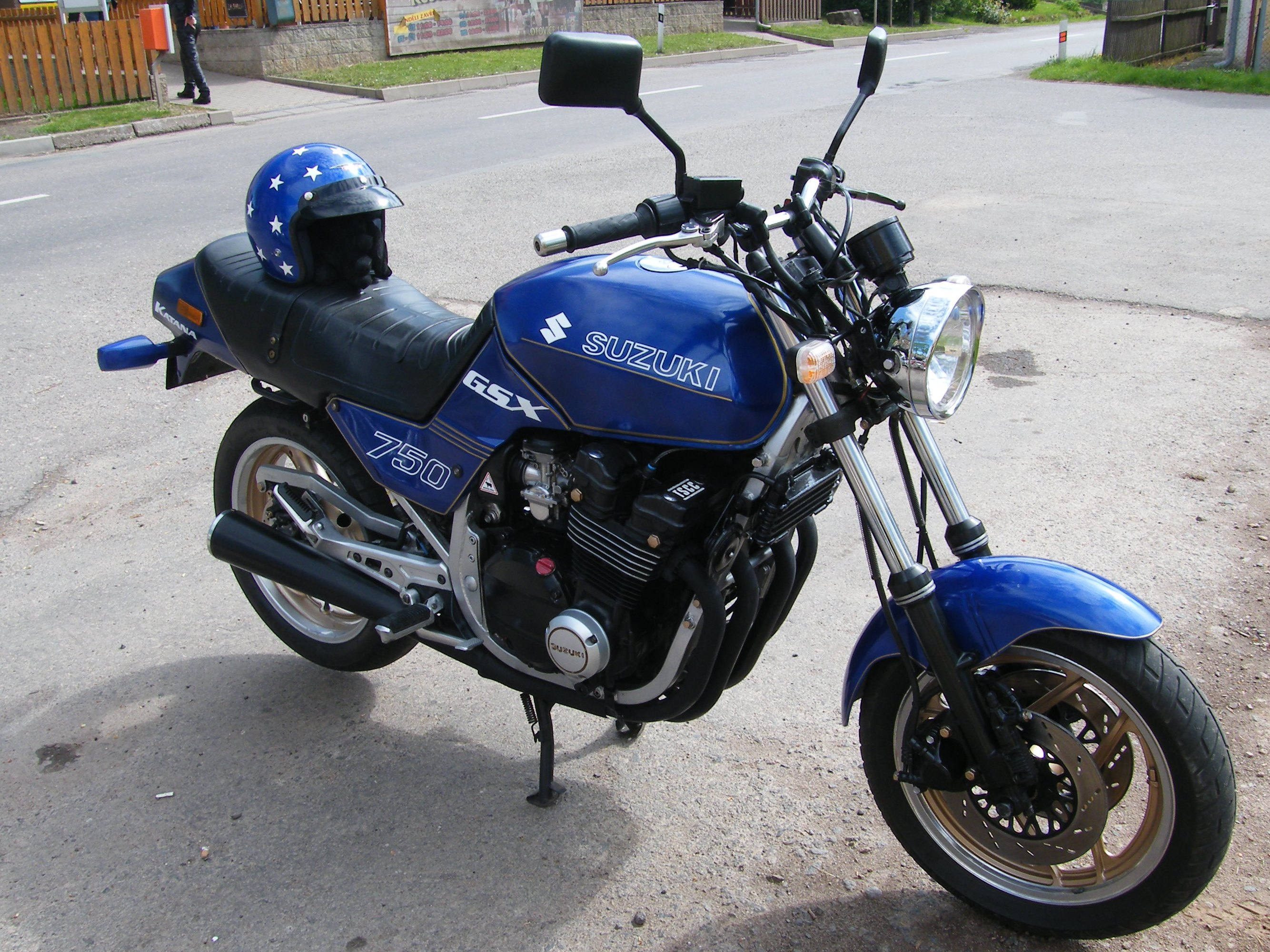
Suzuki GSX 750 Katana

Suzuki also produced 550 cc (34 cu in), 650 and 750 cc (40 and 46 cu in) versions of the Katana. The 650 had a drive shaft, while the 1984-1986 SE/SF/SG750 is distinguished by having a pop-up headlight. Appearing in 1984 was the Katana 750SE with a pop-up headlight, still using an air-oil cooled engine. These were quite popular, even when their performance was easily outdone by other competitors at the time.

The air-cooled GSX Katanas were effectively the last Suzuki sports motorcycles that were 'sporting models' derived from an existing standard model (UJM). The next generation of Suzuki sports bike being the purpose designed oil-cooled GSX-R series in 1985.

The Katana name was reused, primarily in the North American and European market, to market the revised Suzuki GSX-F series from the end of the 1980s through to 2006. However, in most other markets around the globe, the GSX600F, GSX750F and GSX1100F are considered to be the direct replacement for the in-house styled GSX550E, GSX750E and GSX1100E sports tourers, and not as direct developments of the Target designed machines. The GSX-F range comprised five basic models split into two general eras: the 1988–1997 GSX600F and GSX750F and the 1988–1993 GSX1100F, followed by the 1998–2006 GSX600F and GSX750F, both of which were heavily restyled compared to their predecessors. These same models were offered in Europe, but without the Katana name, which was absent in Europe from 1986 until the 1999 arrival of a line of 50 cc scooters.

The original design ethos reappeared at the 2005 Tokyo Motor Show, when Suzuki rolled out a concept bike called the Suzuki Stratosphere with a inline-six engine.

Features used by the design team for the original Katana can be seen in many motorcycles of the 1980s through the present, from Suzuki's own XN85 Turbo bike to subtle markings on the RG250 two-stroke bikes. The fact that modern sport motorcycles generally have a fairing and seat that visually merge into a sloped fuel tank is directly traceable to the original Katana ED1 and ED2 designs.

=== Suzuki Katana 1000 ===
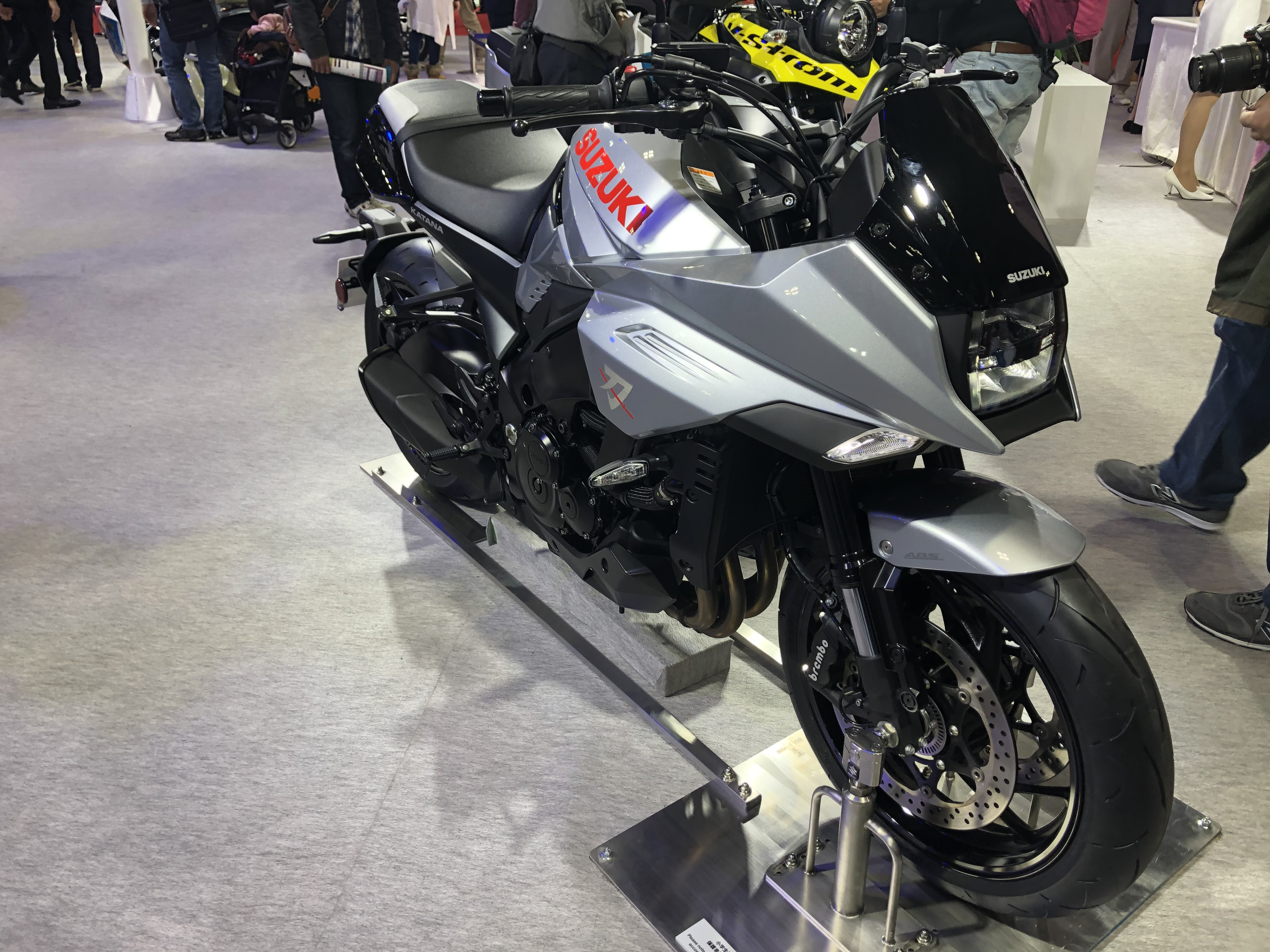
Suzuki Katana 1000

Since 2019, Suzuki has reused the Katana name for its redesigned 2020 model. This new version is based on the GSX-S1000F and is powered by a 2005–2006 GSX-R1000 K5 engine with a claimed power output of 110 kW (150 hp). The new Katana's weight comes in at 215 kg (474 lb) with the GSX-S chassis twin-spar beam alloy frame, inverted forks, GSX-R swingarm, and Brembo front calipers. Its styling pays homage to the original 1981 design.
