= RGV =

RGV may refer to:

- Ram Gopal Varma (born 1962), an Indian film director, screenwriter and producer known as RGV
- Ratnagotravibhāga, a compendium of tathāgatagarbha literature
- Rio Grande Valley, a geographical region of the U.S. state of Texas
- Suzuki motorcycles RGV250 and RGV500
- A high-speed train, see Euroduplex
