= Suzuki RG250 Gamma =

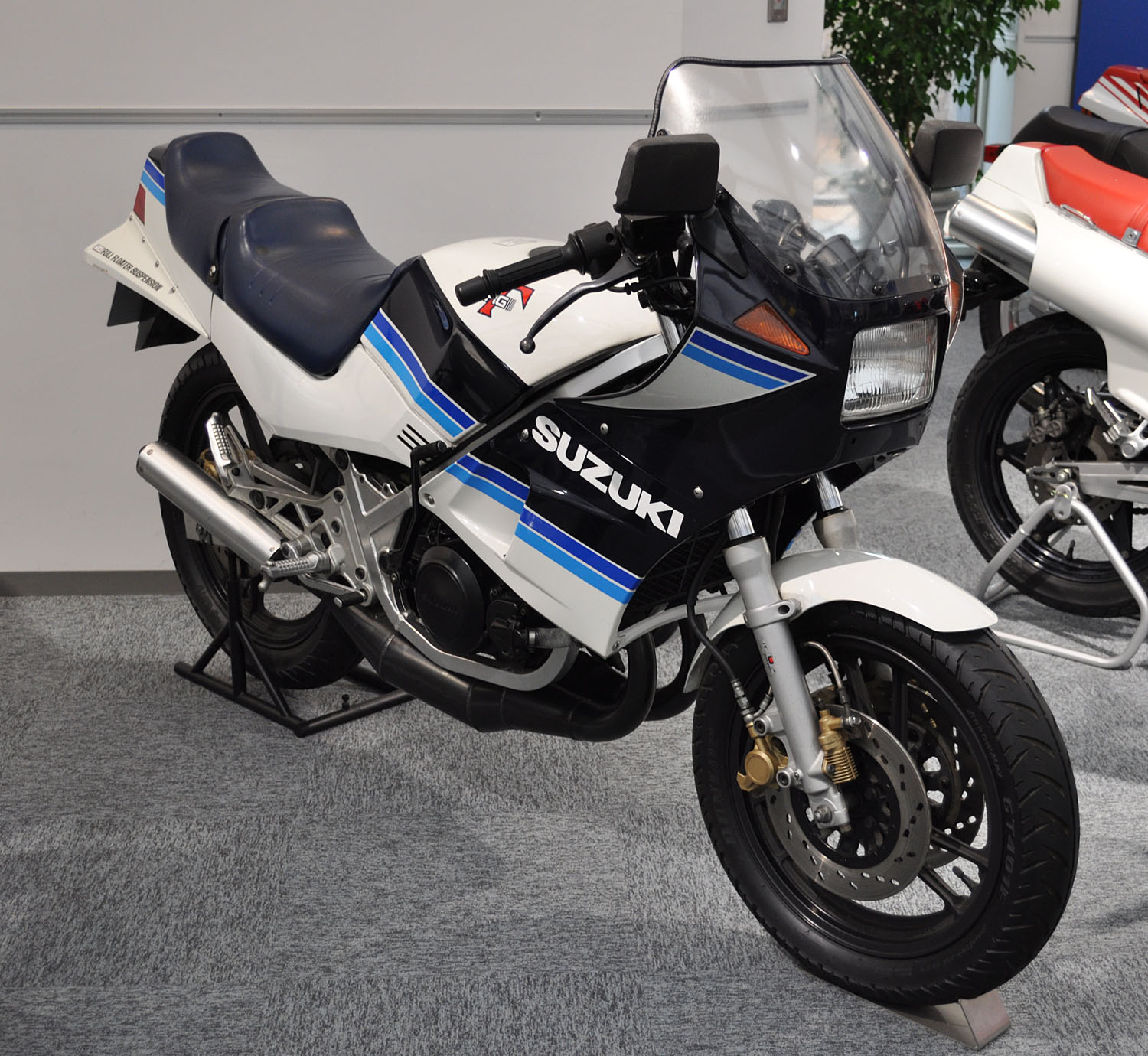
- Manufacturer: Suzuki
- Production: 1983–1987
- Predecessor: RG250
- Successor: RGV250
- Class: Sport motorcycle
- Engine: 247 cc (15.1 cu in) two-stroke, twin cylinder
- Bore / stroke: 54 mm × 54 mm (2.1 in × 2.1 in)
- Top speed: 160 km/h (99 mph)
- Power: 32.8 kW (44.0 hp) @ 8,500 rpm (crank)
- Torque: 37.0 N⋅m (27.3 lbf⋅ft) @ 8,000 rpm
- Transmission: 6-speed constant mesh
- Suspension: Front: Telescopic, coil spring oil damped Rear: Single shock with linkage
- Brakes: Front: Double 260mm discs Rear: Single 210mm disc
- Tires: Front: 110/90-16 54S; Rear: 110/80-18 58S
- Rake, trail: 24.7° / 102 mm
- Wheelbase: 1,385 mm (54.5 in)
- Dimensions: L: 2,050 mm (81 in); W: 685 mm (27.0 in); H: 1,220 mm (48 in)
- Seat height: 785 mm (30.9 in)
- Weight: 131 kg (289 lb) (dry)
- Fuel capacity: 17 L (3.7 imp gal; 4.5 US gal)
- Fuel consumption: 35.7 mpg_{‑US} (6.59 L/100 km; 42.9 mpg_{‑imp})

The Suzuki RG250 Gamma was a two-cylinder parallel, water-cooled 250 cc two-stroke motorcycle produced by Suzuki from 1983 to 1987. One of the major features of the RG250 Gamma was its large power-to-weight ratio. Able to produce up to 45+ BHP at 8,500 RPM and 38.4 Nm torque at 8,000 RPM, weighing in at roughly 130 kg. The RG250 Gamma was the first mass-produced motorcycle to have a lightweight aluminum frame and racing type aerodynamic fairing. The Gamma also had a very advanced 'full floater' suspension system for its time, with the first Mk1s having 'anti-dive' front forks (which locked the forks under hard braking to stop them diving). Due to this, the bike was dubbed the first street legal racer.

In its five years of production the model underwent three major changes:

Mk1 (1983–1984): 45-46 hp and 38 Nm torque. Very first bikes had a single brake disc on the front.

Mk2 (1985): Revised front fairings, mudguard and colour scheme and a slightly shorter wheelbase (from 1385 mm to 1360 mm)

Mk3 (1986–1987): Introduction of Suzuki's AEC system (Automatic Exhaust Control). This gave the bike a higher (around 49-50+hp) power rating.

(AEC system: Same idea as the now standard power valve design, but using a 'butterfly flap' to open and close an addition chamber on the cylinder head (open @ low RPM, closed at higher). This effectively expands the exhaust system at low RPM, to allow the exhaust to be tuned for high RPM. The AEC system opens at around 7500 RPM)

Mk4: (1987): There was also a very short-lived Mk4 version created for the Japanese home market, which had larger front discs, thicker tyres and larger diameter front forks. This model was never exported.

The RG250 Gamma was replaced by the RGV250 Gamma (V-Twin) in 1988.
