= Suzuki RG250 =

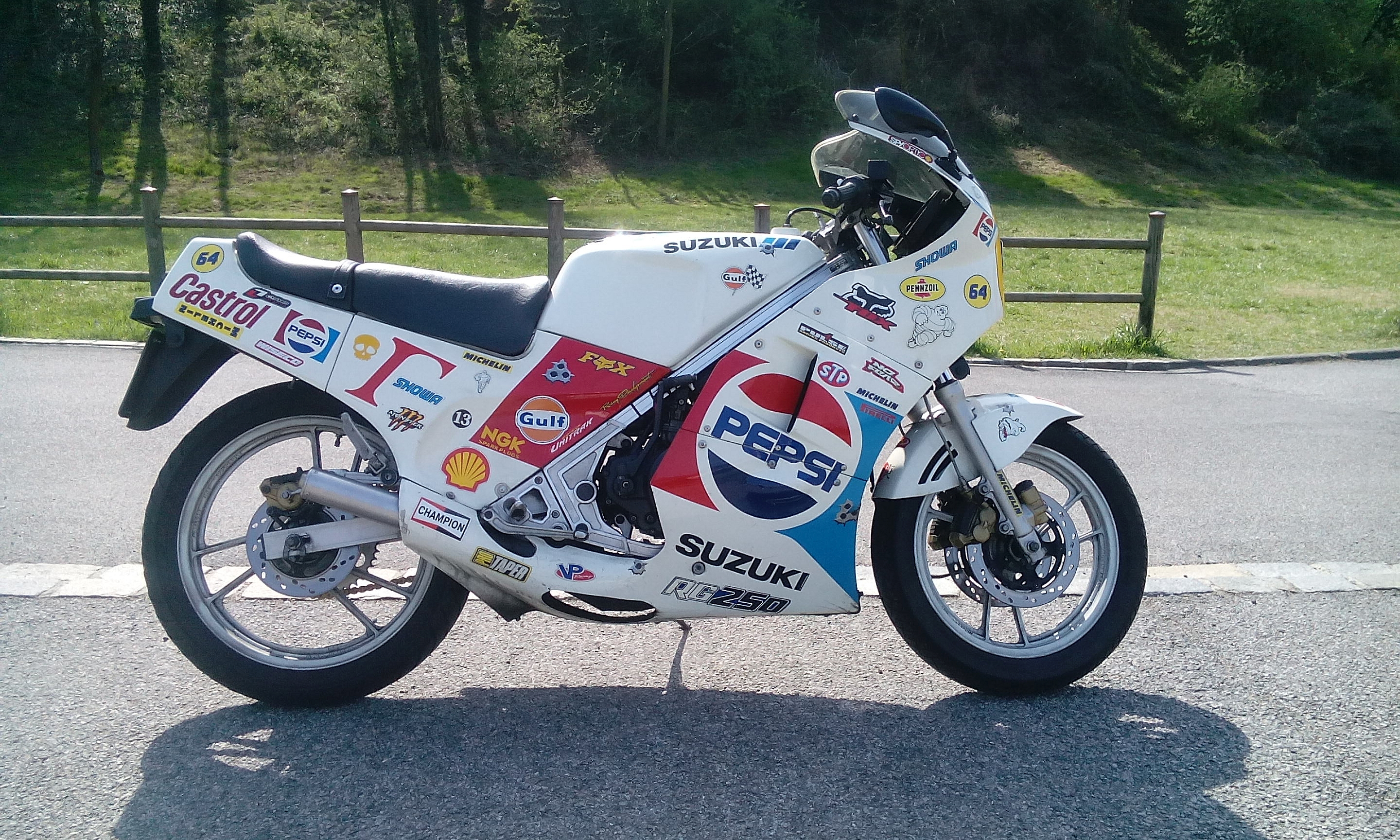
- Manufacturer: Suzuki
- Production: 1978–1982
- Predecessor: GT250 X-7
- Successor: RG250 Gamma
- Class: Sport motorcycle
- Engine: 247 cc (15.1 cu in) two-stroke, twin cylinder
- Bore / stroke: 54 mm × 54 mm (2.1 in × 2.1 in)
- Top speed: 160 km/h (99 mph)
- Power: 22.4 kW (30.0 hp) @ 8,000 rpm (crank)
- Torque: 28.4 N⋅m (20.9 lbf⋅ft) @ 7,000 rpm
- Transmission: 6-speed constant mesh
- Suspension: Front: Telescopic, coil spring oil damped Rear: Twin shock, oil damped
- Brakes: Front: Single disc Rear: Drum brake
- Tires: Front: 3.00-18; Rear: 3.25-18
- Rake, trail: 62.7° / 107 mm
- Wheelbase: 1,320 mm (52 in)
- Dimensions: L: 2,005 mm (78.9 in); W: 760 mm (30 in); H: 1,055 mm (41.5 in)
- Weight: 126 kg (278 lb) (dry)
- Fuel capacity: 15 L (3.3 imp gal; 4.0 US gal)
- Fuel consumption: 47 mpg_{‑US} (5.0 L/100 km; 56 mpg_{‑imp})
- Related: Suzuki RG250E (cast alloy wheel version)

The Suzuki RG250 was a two-cylinder, 250 cc, two-stroke sports motorcycle produced by Suzuki Motor Corporation from 1978 until 1982. First released in 1978 with the RG125 and RG250 to replace the popular GT125 and GT185. The RG250 was a completely new bike when compared to the GT series. Power was improved slightly over the GT250 X7 and weight was reduced by 20 kg leading to a standing 1/4 mile (400m) acceleration of 14.2 seconds.

The success of the RG250 was followed by the release of the RG250 Gamma in 1983.
