= Suzuki Stratosphere =

Concept motorcycle

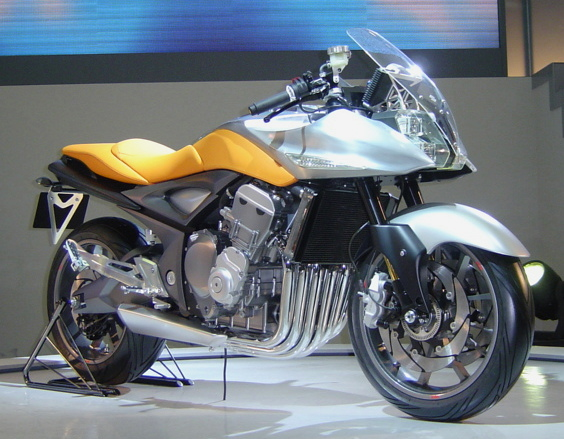
Suzuki Stratosphere at the 39th Tokyo Motor Show

Suzuki Stratosphere is a Suzuki concept motorcycle, powered by an 1100cc transverse narrow-bore 24-valve inline-6 engine, rated at 180 HP. According to Suzuki press materials, the engine produced above 100 lb-ft of torque from just above idle all the way to redline. The engine was reported to be three-quarters of an inch narrower than the Hayabusa 4-cylinder engine due to the narrow-bore spacing. The prototype was first unveiled on October 22, 2005, at the 39th Tokyo Motor Show. Its general design is based on and harks back to the original Suzuki ED1/ED2 Katana created by Target Design.

Specifics to the prototype shown in Tokyo:

- Electrically adjustable windshield
- Four LED headlights
- Adjustable handlebars
- Built-in GPS navigation system with blue-tooth tie-in for audio; matching Bluetooth helmet shown at show
- Attachable saddlebags with hidden (recessed, not visually apparent) attachment points
- Combined selectable manual and automatic transmission modes using a servo operated manual transmission, akin to the Yamaha FJR1300A.
- Integrated Anti-theft electronic wireless keyfob system, akin to the Kawasaki Concours 14 Ki-Pass keyfob system.

== Production approved ==
Suzuki confirmed in August 2007 the Suzuki Stratosphere would enter production, although expected release date, initial model year, initial pricing, and specific list of changes from the original prototype shown in Tokyo were not released, aside from the fact that it would retain the six-cylinder narrow-bore engine. Given Suzuki's experience with the B-King, it was likely that the Stratosphere would appear, at least visually, very similar to the prototype, although the aluminum fairings were apt to be replaced by ABS fairings, and many of the specialty electronics (GPS, HUD, etc.) were unlikely to see production.

According to media sources, the Stratosphere was to enter production as a 2009 model.
