= Suzuki RGV250 =

Suzuki sport motorcycle

Suzuki RGV 250
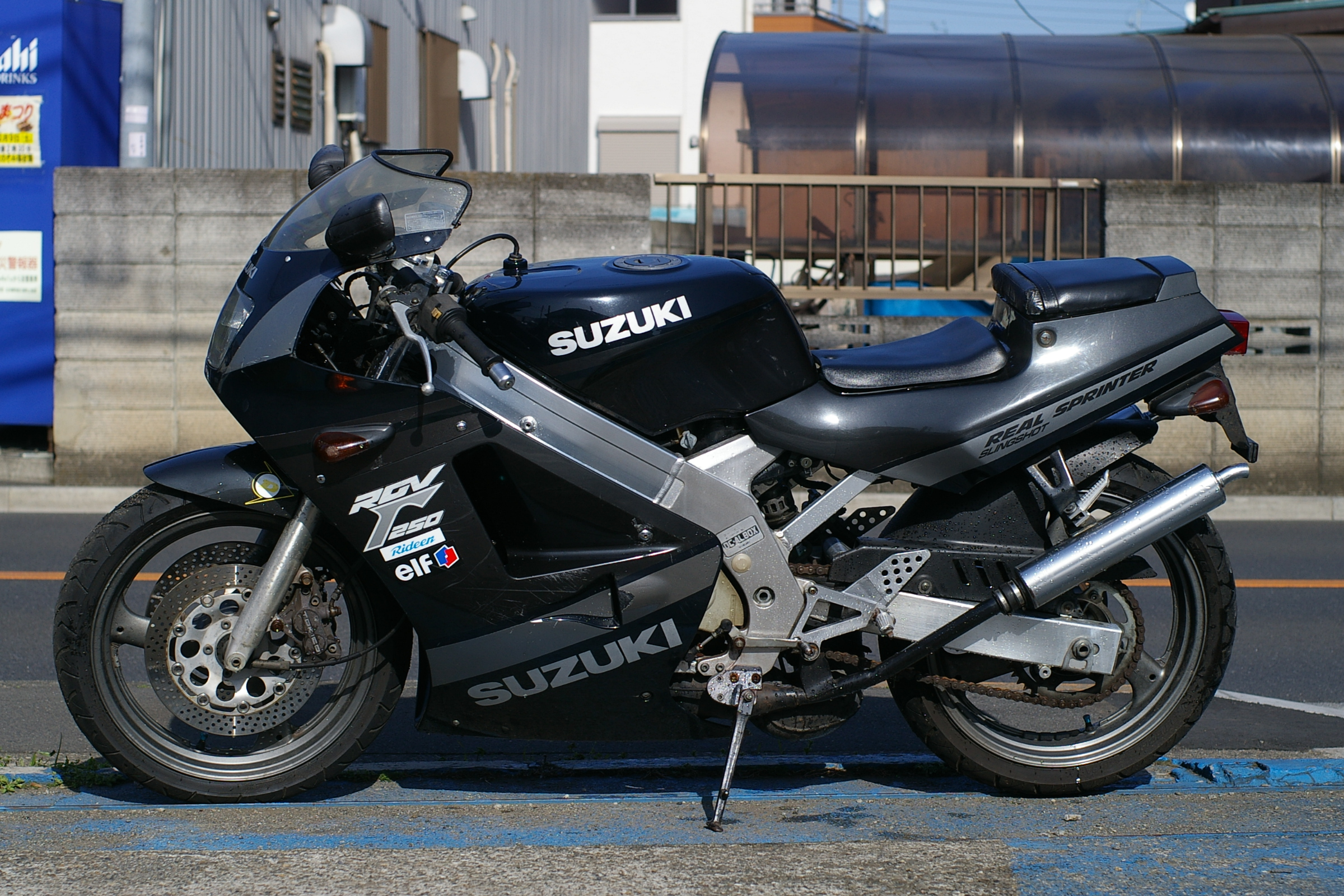
- Suzuki RGV250 VJ21
- Manufacturer: Suzuki
- Production: 1988–1998
- Predecessor: Suzuki RG250 Gamma
- Class: Sport bike
- Engine: 249 cc (15.2 cu in) two-stroke 90° V-Twin
- Bore / stroke: 56 mm × 50.6 mm (2.20 in × 1.99 in)
- Power: 62 hp (46 kW) (unrestricted)
- Transmission: Six-speed manual
- Brakes: Drilled vented discs front and rear
- Wheelbase: 54.3 in (1,380 mm)
- Weight: 305 lb (138 kg) (dry); 345 lb (156 kg) (wet)
- Related: Suzuki RGV500; Aprilia RS250 (as it shares the same engine)

The Suzuki RGV250 was a Suzuki high performance sport bike which had a great number of its features and design cues based on Grand Prix technologies and ideas. It is a race-replica based on Suzuki's 250 cc (15 cu in) GP bikes from 1987 to 1998, the RGV V-2 racer. This motorcycle replaced the RG250 Gamma, which employed an alloy frame with a two-stroke parallel twin engine. The bike produced over 60 bhp in a narrow power band between 8,000 and 11,000 rpm. The dry weight ranged between 128 kg (282 lb) (1989) to 140 kg (309 lb) (later models) dry weight.

The top speed of a standard RGV250 is around 130 mph (209 km/h). It has a 0-60 mph (97 km/h) time of around 3.7 seconds.

This motorcycle's engine performance is not very inspiring at engine speeds under 7,000 rpm, due to the two-stroke engine power delivery of a relatively narrow power band. However, once the engine is revved over 8,000 rpm, the power delivery characteristics effectively doubles, as is expected of a two-stroke racing motorcycle.

Due to its light weight, engine characteristics and cornering capabilities, it is particularly suited to the track, compared to other motorcycles of similar engine capacity.

== Model designation and power ==
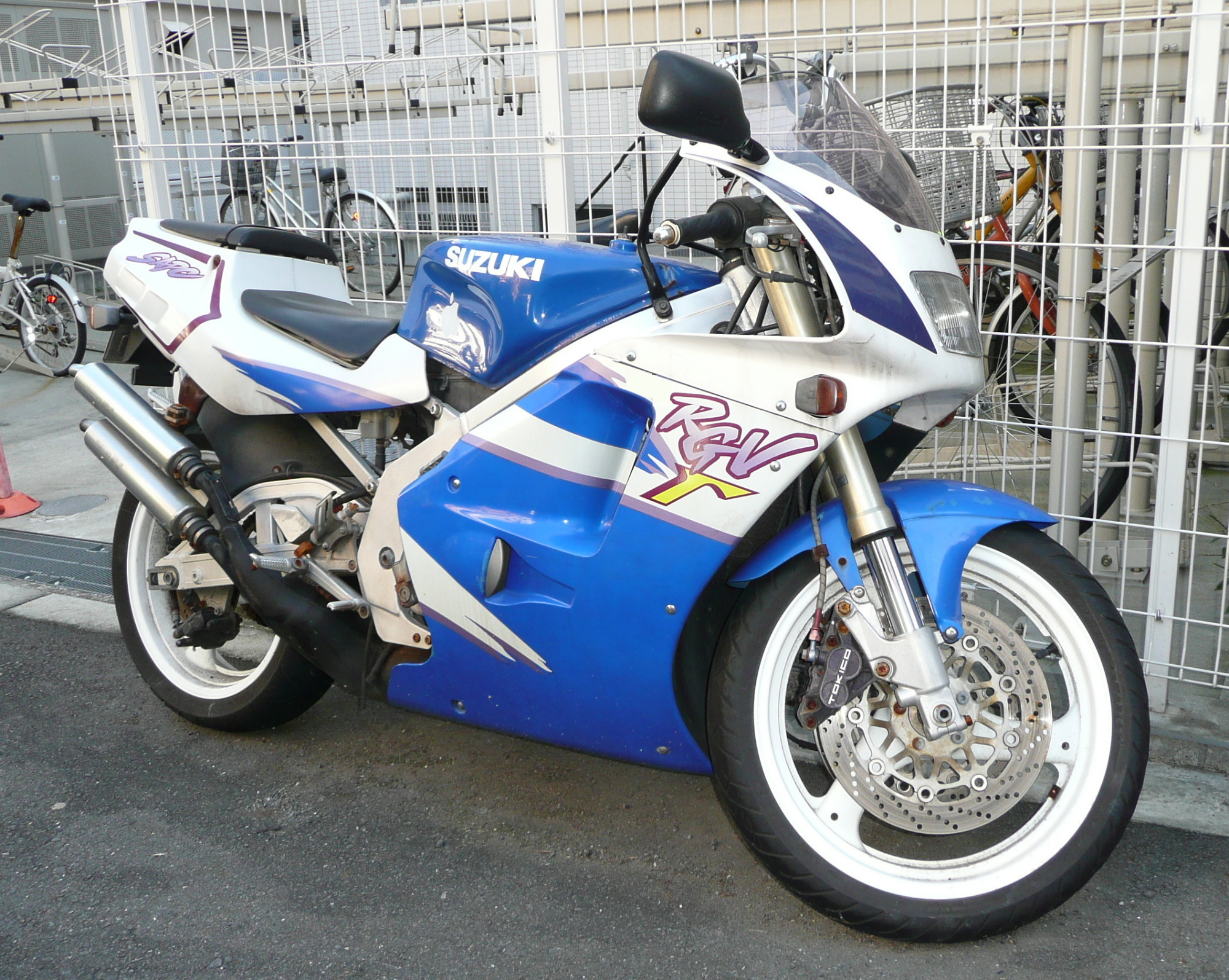
Suzuki RGV250 VJ22

All RGV250 models, with the exception of the Japanese domestic market's version (restricted to 45 hp), make 50+ hp. The model designations are:

- VJ21:1988-1991: quoted power; 1988=58 hp, 1989=59 hp (90° V-Twin)
- VJ22:1991-1996: quoted power; 1990=62 hp (revised engine, still 90° V-Twin)
- VJ23:1997-1998: quoted power; 1997=70 hp ('SP' (sports production) model with new 70° V-Twin engine)

== Technical ==
The VJ21 was the first RGV250 production motorcycle available in Japan in 1988. Technical aspects were:-

- Alloy Beam frame
- 90-degree, water-cooled two-cylinder two-stroke V-Twin style V engine (separate crankcases, single in-line crankshaft)
- 2 piece, blade style, exhaust valves which have two positions - open and closed
- Dual Reed valves, with Suzuki Intake Pulse Control system (SIPC), similar to Yamaha Energy Induction System (YEIS) but avoids patent issues
- 32 mm Mikuni Carburettors on 88/89 models, replaced with 34 mm models with single air bleed on 1990 model
- 17" front, 18" rear three spoke alloy wheels with twin 296 mm front disc brakes and single rear
- Front suspension is conventional 41 mm damper type telescopic motorcycle forks (not cartridge)
- Suzuki Pointless Electronic Ignition (PEI) analogue ignition system on 1988 models, replaced with digital system on 1989/90 models which was a predecessor to the SAPC as fitted on the VJ22
- Dual, side-by-side expansion chambers

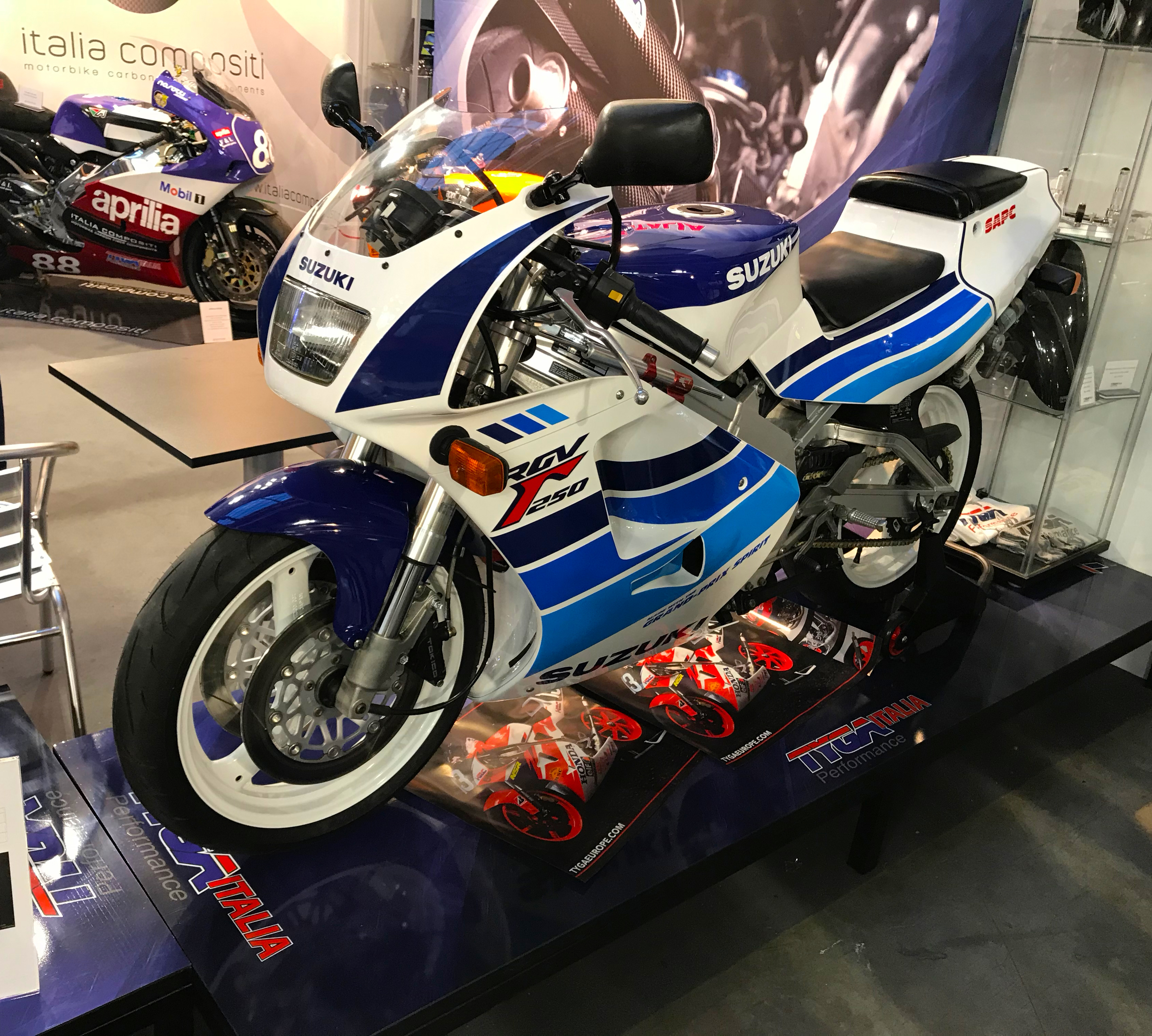
1993 Suzuki RGV250 VJ22

The VJ22 machine relied heavily on the VJ21, but had the following improvements:-

- Suzuki Advanced Power Control (SAPC) Electronic power valve and ignition timing control
- 3 piece, blade style, exhaust valves with three positions - closed, half open and fully open
- 34 mm Mikuni carburettors with dual air bleed system
- 41 mm inverted cartridge type telescopic motorcycle forks
- modified swing arm fitted to permit both expansion chambers to be routed on the right hand side
- 17" rear wheel
- 310 mm front discs

In addition, a restricted VJ22 model was available in Japan as Sports Production (SP) model, which came with dry clutch and close-ratio gearbox as standard. A later SPII model reverted to standard wide-ratio gearbox. The VJ23 uses a totally redesigned engine with few interchangeable parts with the early models.

== Reception ==
In the UK, the motorcycle press responded favourably to the VJ21. However, the initial VJ22 models had a design flaw in the 'improved' 3 piece exhaust valves in which they crack likely due to carbon build up from boiling oil within the mechanism and failed to open from the idle/low power position. This was corrected on later VJ22 models, but still needs to be inspected regularly. The VJ23 is not known to have powervalve issues.

== Riding experience ==
These motorcycles are not particularly suited to carrying pillion passengers on long rides, due to their race-oriented, uncomfortable design. Touring is also not a strong point of this model. In straight-line acceleration, the RGV250 is faster than most other 250 cc two-stroke and four-stroke motorcycles.

The Aprilia RS250 is related and uses a modified RGV250 VJ22 (90° 2-Stroke V-Twin) engine. Aprilia bought engines from Suzuki (which were fitted with Aprilia branded castings on the timing and clutch covers), then fit their own expansion chambers, barrels and ECU. They also redesigned the heads to have larger cooling passages and a slightly different combustion chamber shape.
