= Motorcycle braking systems =

Feature that integrated in motorcycle

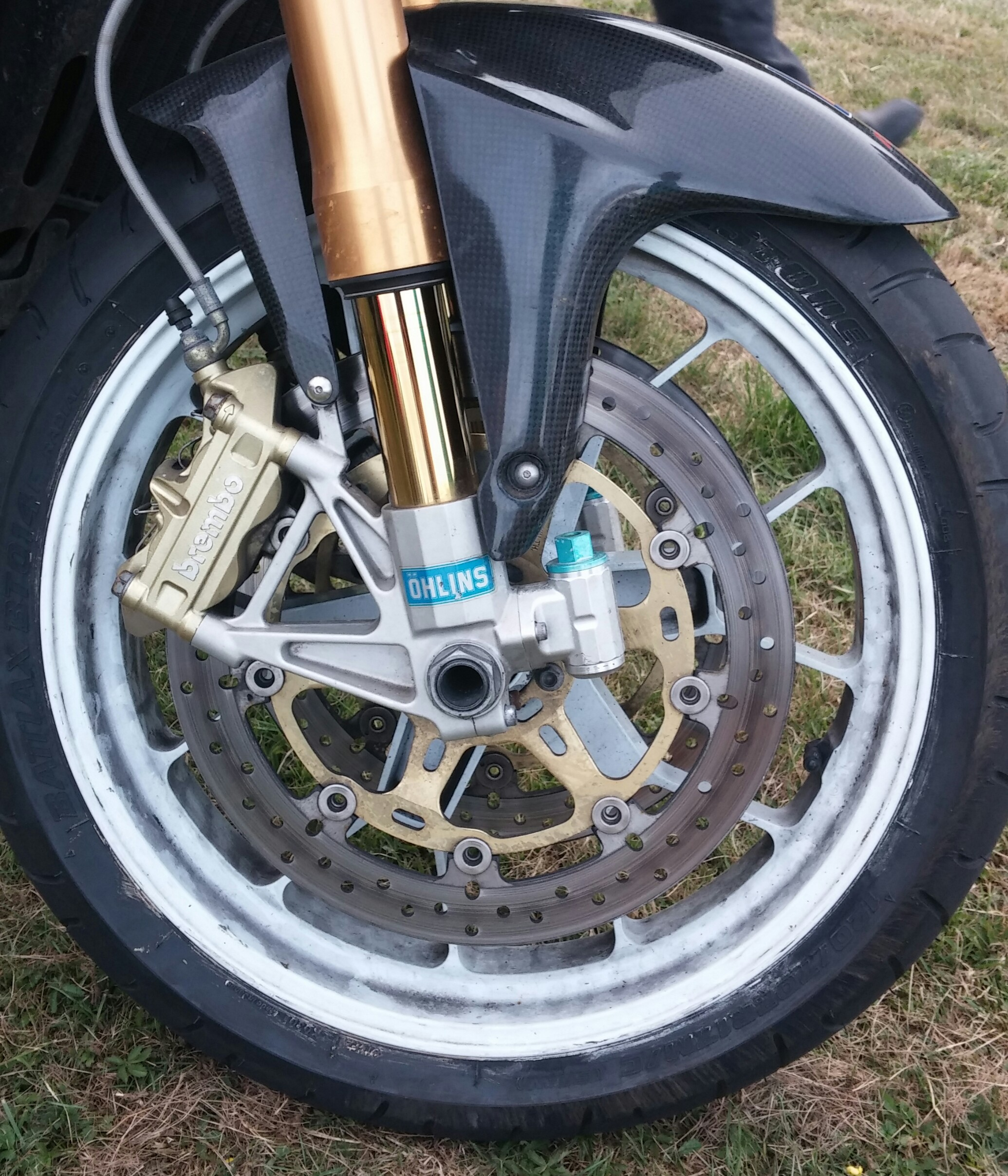
Aprilia Tuono R front brakes have two floating stainless steel discs with sintered pads, and radially mounted, four-piston calipers

Motorcycle braking systems have varied throughout time, as motorcycles evolved from bicycles with an engine attached, to the 220 mph (350 km/h) prototype motorcycles seen racing in MotoGP. Most systems work by converting kinetic energy into thermal energy (heat) by friction. On motorcycles, the front brake can provide at least 70% of the stopping power. This however can vary for individual motorcycles; longer-wheelbase types having more weight biased rearward, such as cruisers and tourers, can have a greater effort applied by the rear brake. In contrast, sports bikes with a shorter wheelbase and more vertical fork geometry can tolerate higher front braking loads. For these reasons, motorcycles tend to have a vastly more powerful front brake compared to the rear.

== History ==
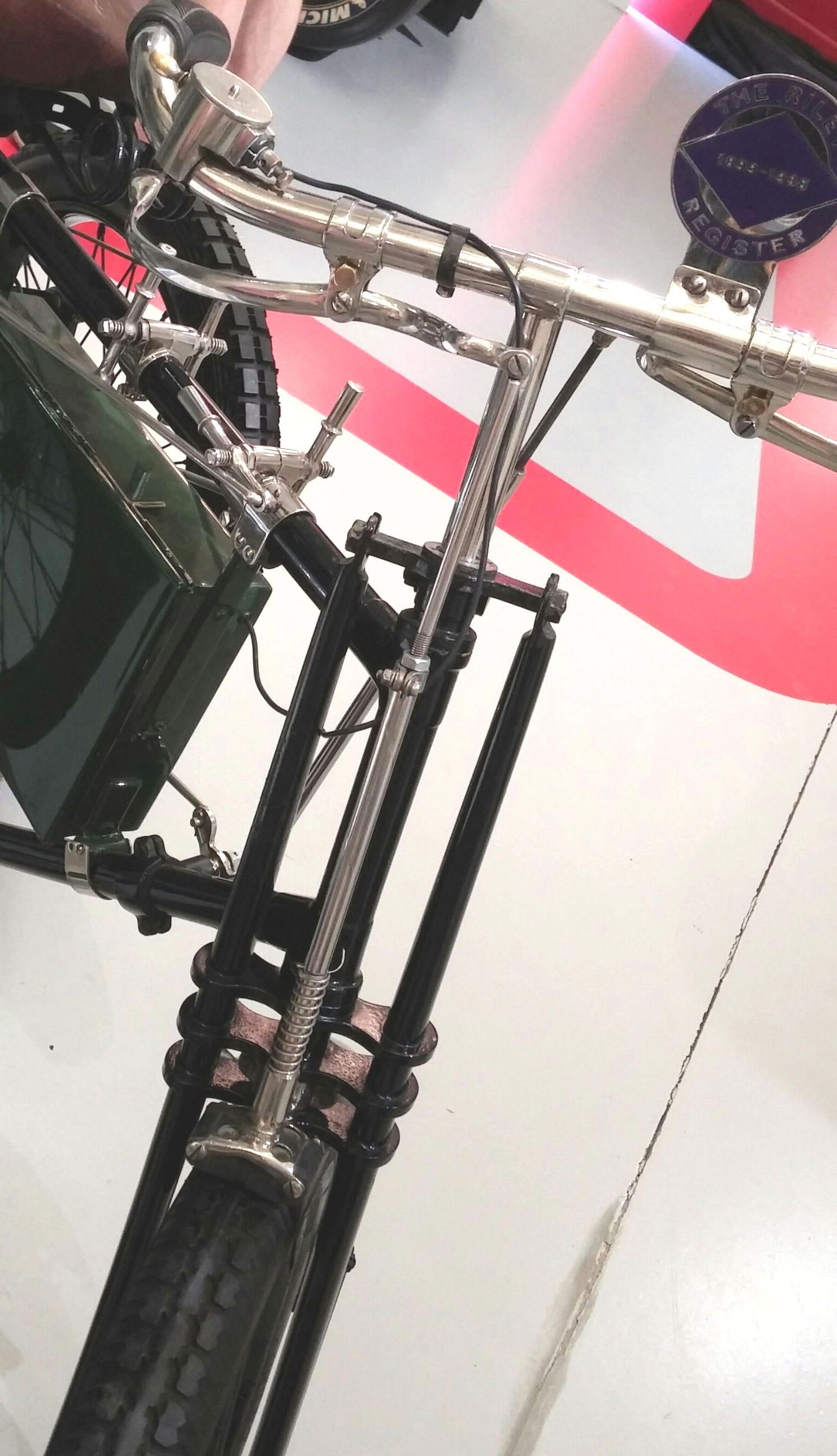
Spoon front brake operated by handlebar lever and connecting rod on an 1899 Royal Riley Tricycle at the Heritage Motor Centre, Gaydon, England

Early motorcycles which were essentially a bicycle with a motor attached and did not have any braking system beyond cutting the power and waiting for the motorcycle to slow down enough to put a foot out. One of the first motorcycles to have any sort of braking mechanism was made by Steffey Motorcycles of Philadelphia in 1902. This used a spoon brake operating on the front wheel only. Around 1909 band brakes were introduced, these used a band contracting round the outside of a drum.

Douglas motorcycles were available with Research Association disc brakes front and rear on their 1923 RA model, sometimes called TT model, with Freddie Dixon's 1923 sidecar TT-winning machine of that type also having a passenger-operated disc brake for the sidecar wheel.

Drum brakes were first used on motorcycles in the 1920s and the basic design has not changed much. Originally used for braking both the front and rear wheels, drum brakes have largely been superseded by disc brakes or are used for rear-braking only.

The Lambretta TV125 Series 3 was the first modern production motorcycle with a disc brake. MV Agusta followed with their limited production 600 cc touring motorcycle announced in 1965 which had a pair of cable-actuated Campagnolo front disc brakes. The 1969 Honda CB750 put motorcycle disc brakes into the mass market, using a hydraulically operated single piston sliding caliper with a solid front disc.

Early cast wheels were not easily compatible with drum brakes. Sintered pads offer improved heat up time and better wet weather performance. Asbestos was used in the brake pads but its use declined when the negative health impact was discovered.

In 1989 BMW released the first motorcycle to be equipped with an assisted braking system (ABS). The system fitted to the BMW K100 LT weighed significantly more than the light weight systems fitted to modern motorcycles.

The front suspension on the Yamaha GTS1000 released in 1993 was a single sided swingarm that among other characteristics aimed to reduce diving under braking. The design only allowed for a single front disc brake so a comparatively large 330 mm disc was mated to a six-piston caliper, a world first on a production bike.

The traditional axial caliper mount began to be unreliable when slick tires were introduced, so motorcycles began adopting radially mounted calipers from Formula One car racing.

== Drum brakes ==
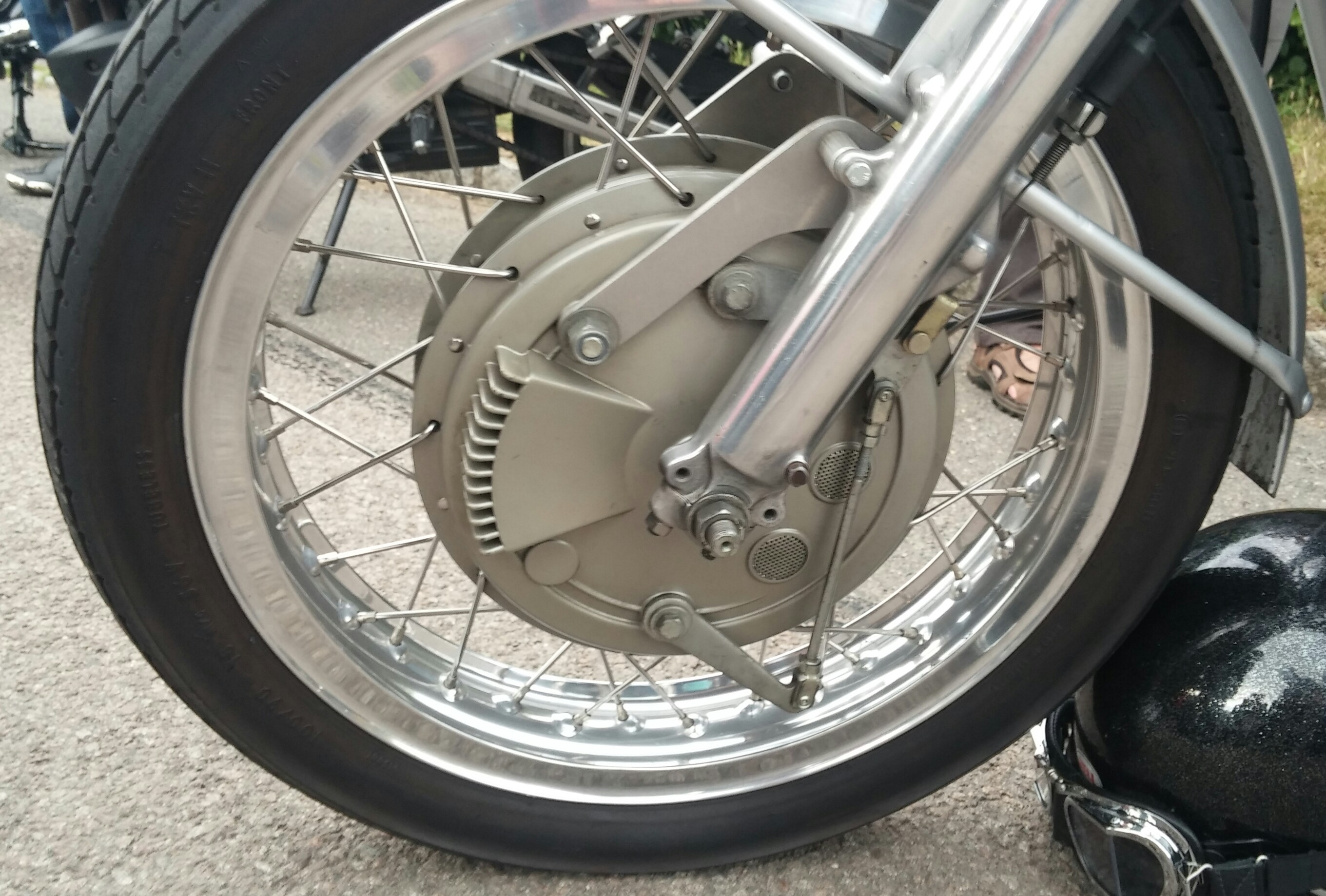
Honda RCB with a front ventilated drum brake from Italian accessories manufacturer Grimeca

Drum brakes have a self servo effect. The most common design is a leading-trailing design. More exotic design had four, eight or sixteen shoes. Some motorcycles used finned and/or vented housings for additional cooling, the first of which was AJS.

== Disc brakes ==
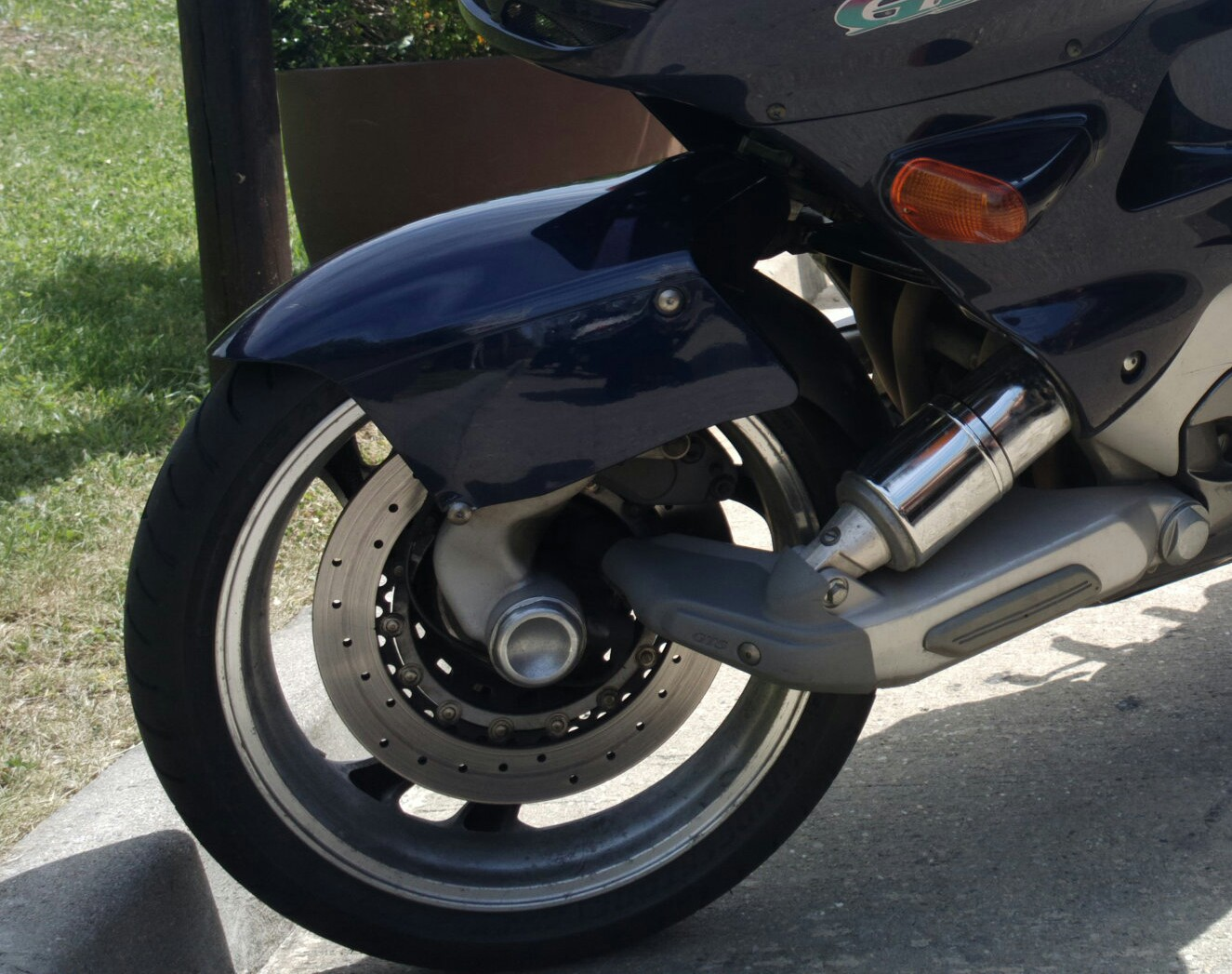
Yamaha GTS1000 front swingarm and brake assembly.

=== Discs ===
Floating discs have better disc centering with a fixed caliper. A floating disc also avoids disc warping and reduces heat transfer to the wheel hub. Lambretta were the first manufacturer to use floating discs on a volume production motorcycle.

Wavy discs place the mass closer to the axle for reduced inertia, better heat dissipation and lower weight. They were originally developed for Motocross bikes however they have since seen use on road going motorcycles as well.

=== Sliding versus fixed ===
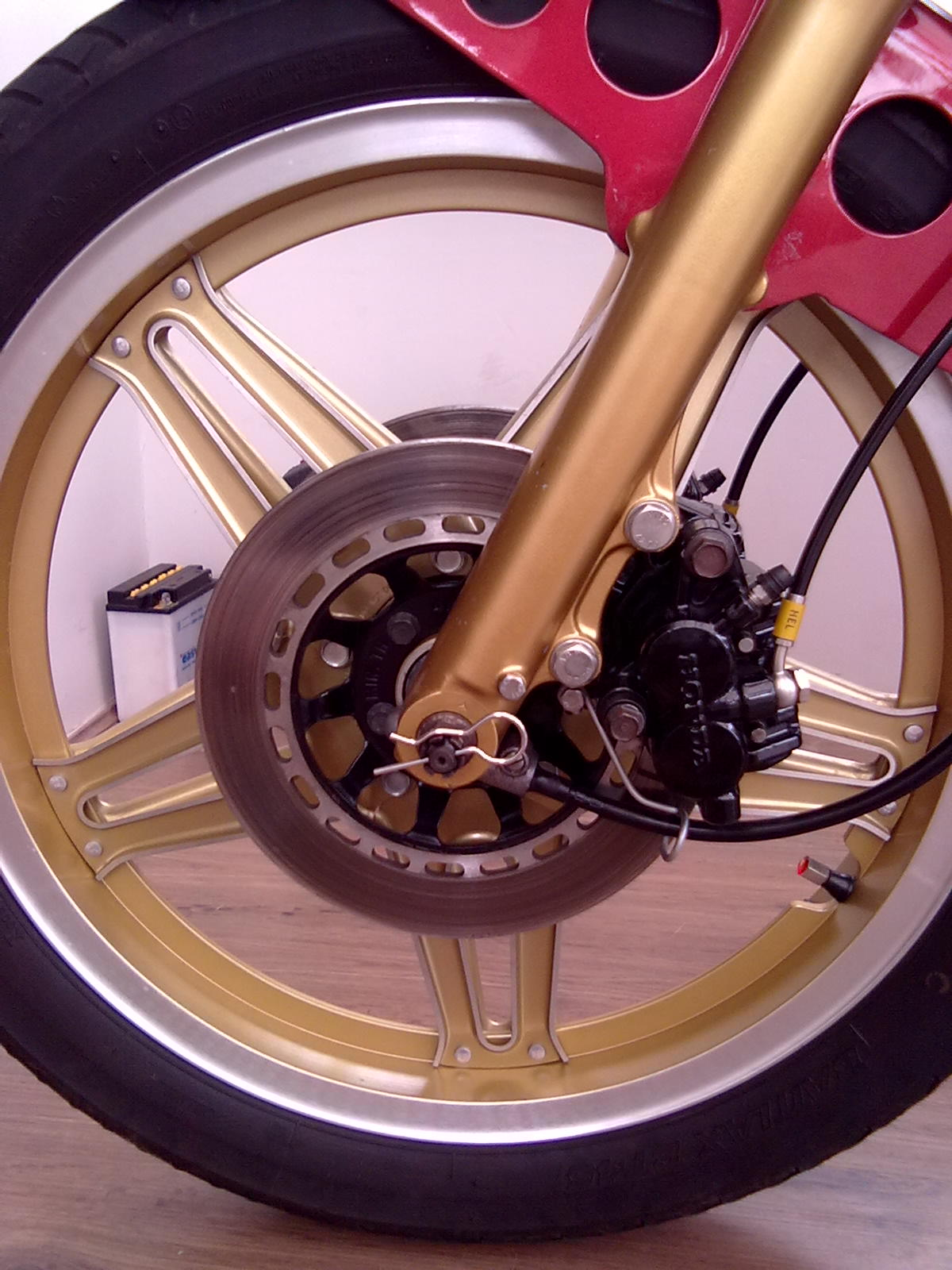
Sliding twin piston caliper on a Honda CB400NC, axial mount

Single action calipers have brake pistons that operate on one side only. This type has a floating pin design which allows the piston side of the caliper to push onto the disc surface and pull the other side into contact as well. Dual action, or opposed calipers, are fixed into position to reduce flex. Dual action have opposed pistons either side of the disc to greatly improve the piston area.

=== Multi piston calipers ===
Larger rotors can be used to increase braking force, but this also increases weight and inertia. To overcome this brake manufacturers developed calipers four, six and even eight pistons. Increasing the number of pistons increases the swept piston area, allowing for longer, narrower brake pads and smaller discs.

=== Caliper mounting ===
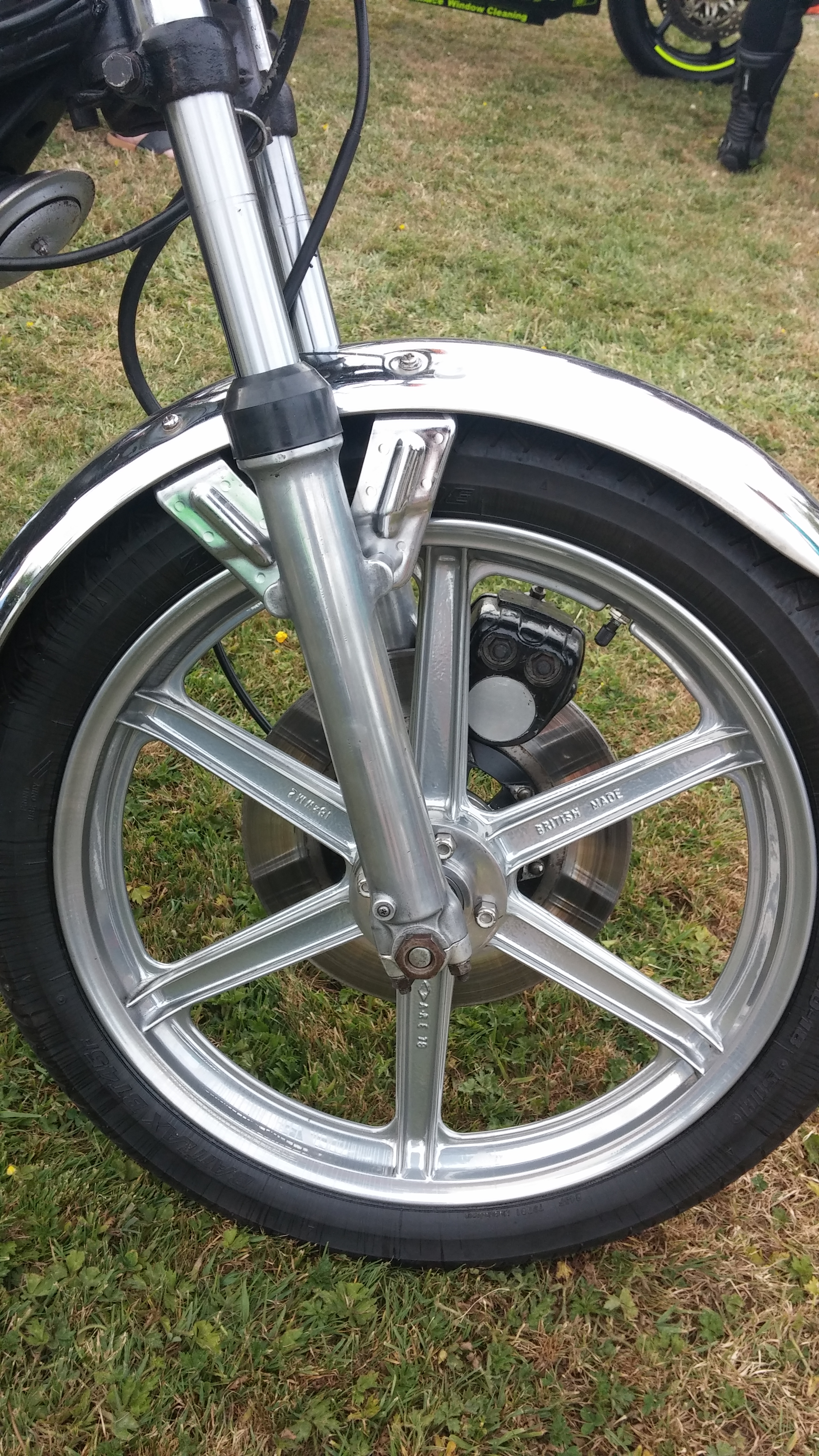
Front fork leg mounted brake caliper, also called axially mounted

Early disc brake calipers were in front of the fork leg on top of the disc. This placed the caliper in an area of high air flow for better heat removal. Calipers on most modern motorcycles are mounted to the rear of the fork leg. This reduces the angular momentum of the fork assembly and improves low speed handling.

==== Radial mounted calipers ====
A radial brake caliper is mounted parallel to the forward direction on the braking system, making them more rigid than the traditional axial mount, and not prone to torsional flexing. The lack of slight lateral movement allows more precise braking and crisper feeling brakes. Radial calipers can make modifying an existing disc brake with larger rotors simpler because the entire mounting bracket does not need to be replaced, needing only a spacer between the bracket and the caliper.

=== Inboard brakes ===
Honda tried an inboard brake design on a few models such as the VF400F and CBX550F, but reverted to the standard layout. The intent was to improve wet weather performance and have a cleaner appearance. The front brake assembly with vented discs was enclosed in a vented aluminium hub and the caliper was mounted onto the hub and gripped the disc from the outside. This kept the brake assembly dry and allowed the use of cast iron ventilated discs because the shrouding covered any unsightly surface rust on the disc. The system would prove to be short lived with all successive models reverting to the standard uncovered layout thereafter.

=== Caliper construction ===
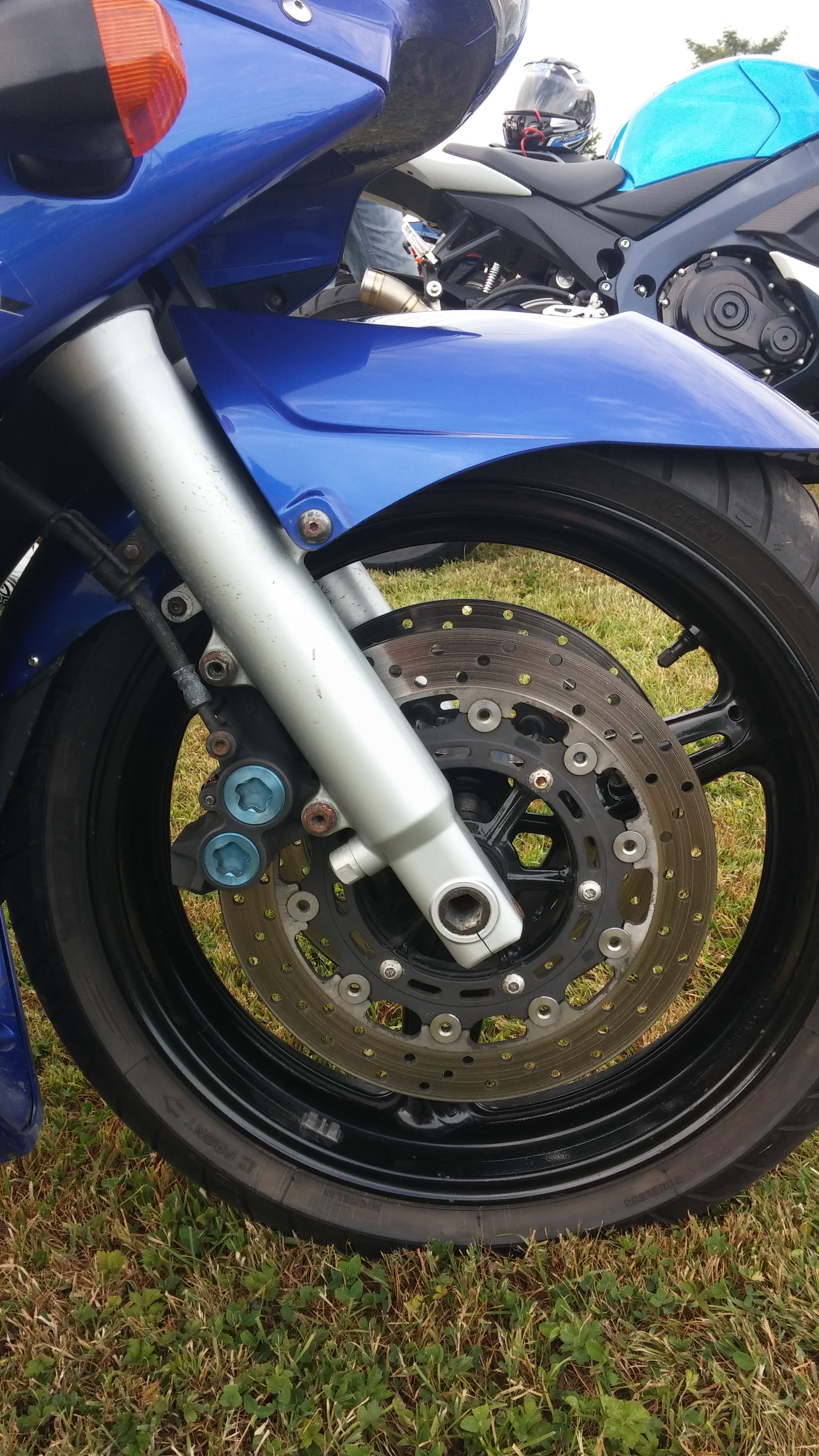
Yamaha FJR1300 "blue dot" axial mount caliper, used on many Yamaha models

Traditionally opposing piston brake calipers are made in two halves which are then bolted together. The advantages of this method are ease and the speed of which the pieces can be made. The disadvantage is that they are less resistant to flex under load. Monobloc calipers machined from a single piece of metal are stronger, but much more expensive to make so some manufacturers such as Sumitomo cast the caliper body as one piece and then machine the piston bores externally with the holes created plugged after assembly. This type of caliper design has been used extensively by Yamaha on a wide range of models from its flagship Yamaha YZF-R1 to the more budget Yamaha FZS600 Fazer. Monobloc Brembo first used on the Ducati 1098.

=== Perimeter brakes ===
Buell Motorcycle Company adopted a rim-mounted disc brake that was said to reduce unsprung weight in the wheel-brake system, allowing lighter wheel spokes. This style is generically termed a "perimeter brake" for its point of attachment to the wheel, and had been used in smaller numbers by other manufacturers before Buell. They can rarely be found on custom motorcycle wire-spoked wheels.

=== Carbon carbon disc brakes ===
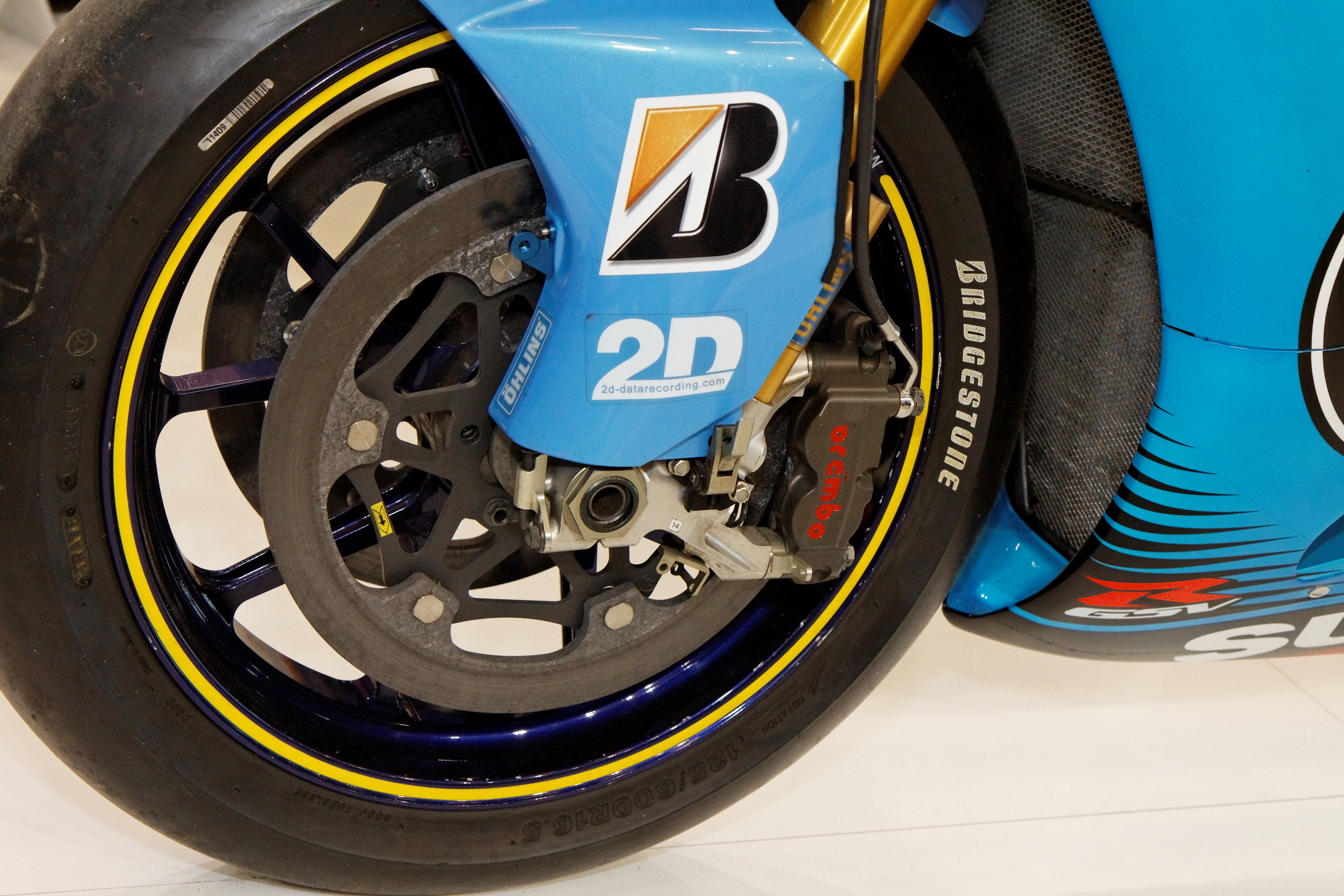
Carbon disc, radial caliper front brakes on the 2011 Suzuki MotoGP racing motorcycle

Carbon brakes are used in Moto GP. The friction between the carbon discs and carbon pads produces vast amounts of braking force; far greater braking force than conventional steel discs. They operate at very high operating temperatures, typically between 400 and 1000 °C. Continuous late braking can overheat carbon carbon brakes as they oxidize and wear out faster. The high temperatures needed for carbon carbon brakes to be effective means that they cannot be used in the wet. For wet races the riders have to switch a conventional steel brake set-up.

== Alternative new systems ==
Drag-racing motorcycles can reach speeds up to 256 mph (412 km/h) over the course of the 1/4 mile (400 m) race and can use disc brakes in conjunction with parachutes to slow them after the timed run. The Streamliner class of motorcycle land speed record machines are mandated to have parachutes fitted if the motorcycle is capable of exceeding 250 miles per hour (400 km/h).

Electric motorcycles can use regenerative braking to both slow the motorcycle down and recharge the batteries at the same.

KTM secretly raced a machine with a KERS style regenerative braking system during the 2008 Valenican 125 cc Grand Prix. Although deemed in contravention of the rules, the use of a KERS system preceded its use in Formula 1.
