= Sport bike =

Motorcycles designed for performance

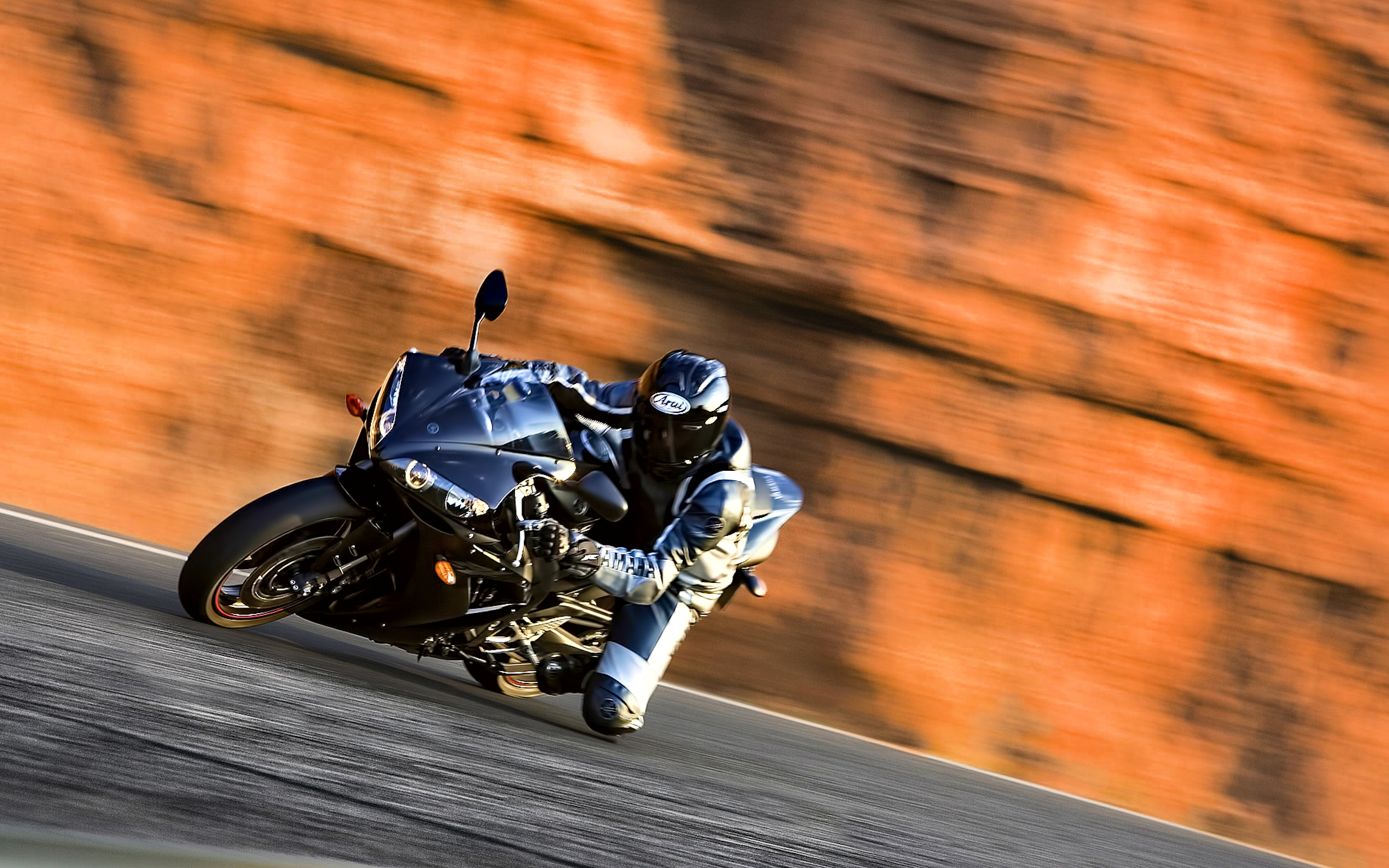
A Yamaha YZF-R1 racing down a hill.

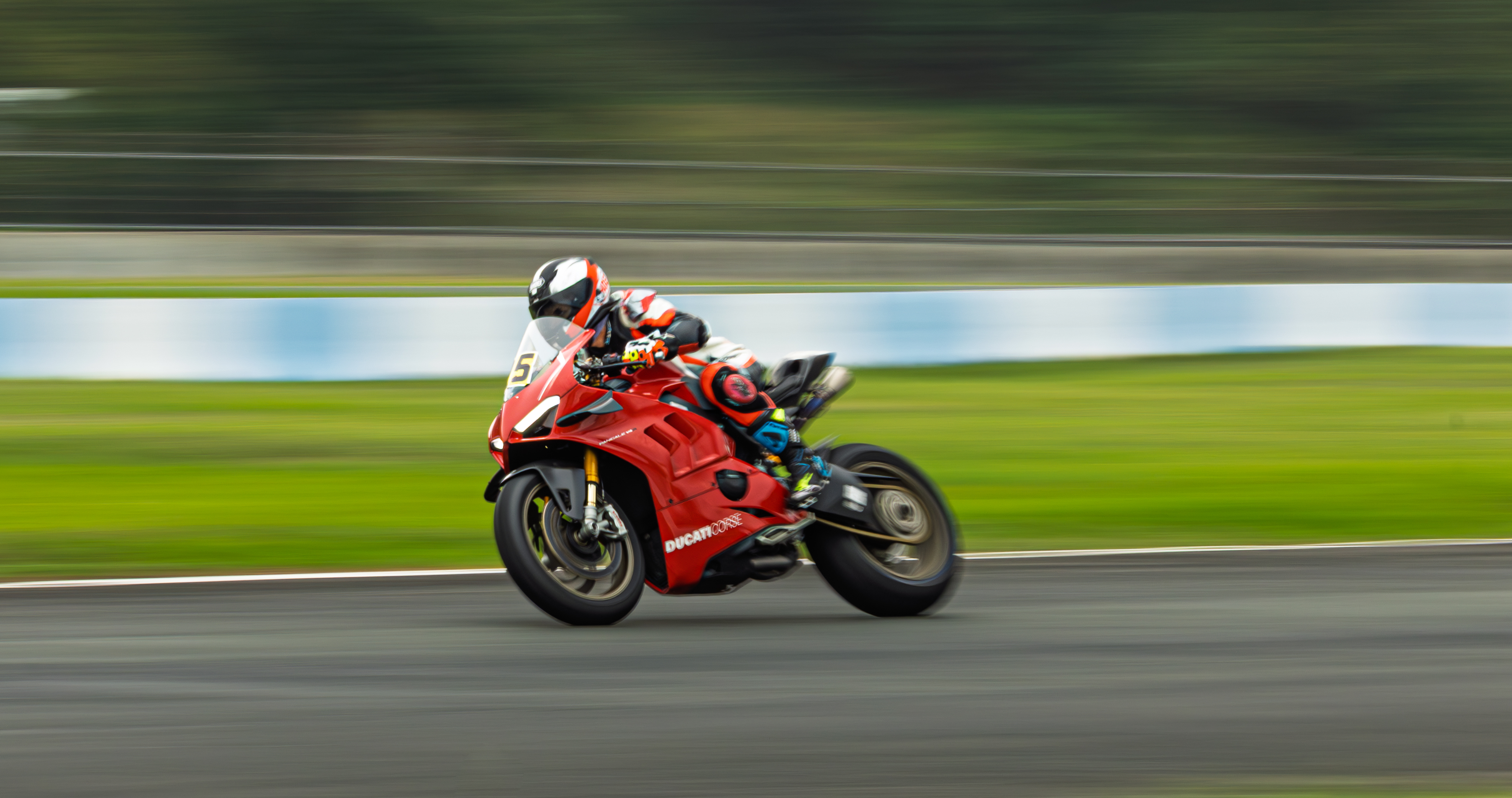
Ducati Panigale V4 at Clark International Speedway during California Superbike School Philippines Track Day held on April 13th 2025

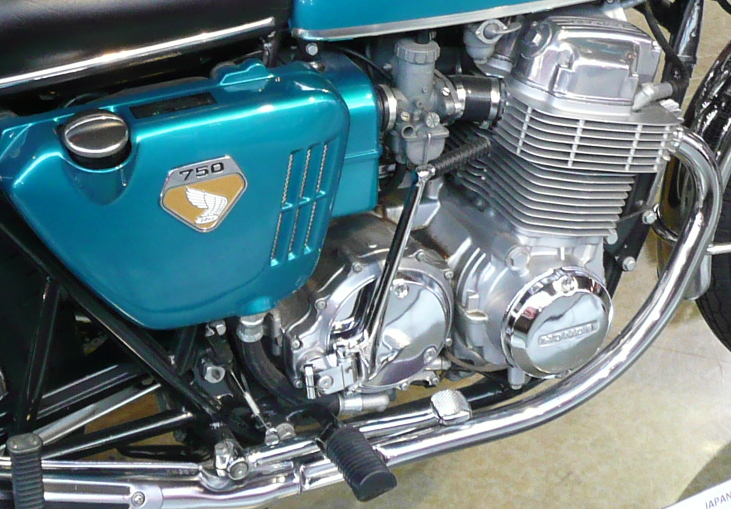
The groundbreaking inline four of the Honda CB750.

A sport bike, sports motorcycle, or sports bike is a motorcycle designed and optimized for speed, acceleration, braking, and cornering on asphalt concrete race tracks and roads. They are mainly designed for performance at the expense of comfort, fuel economy, safety, noise reduction and storage in comparison with other motorcycles.

Sport bikes can be and are typically equipped with fairings and a windscreen to deflect wind from the rider to improve aerodynamics.

== History ==
Soichiro Honda wrote in the owner's manual of the 1959 Honda CB92 Benly Super Sport that, "Primarily, essentials of the motorcycle consists in the speed and the thrill," while Cycle World's Kevin Cameron says that, "A sportbike is a motorcycle whose enjoyment consists mainly from its ability to perform on all types of paved highway – its cornering ability, its handling, its thrilling acceleration and braking power, even (dare I say it?) its speed."

Motorcycles are versatile and may be put to many uses as the rider sees fit. In the past there were few if any specialized types of motorcycles, but the number of types and sub-types has proliferated, particularly in the period since the 1950s. The introduction of the Honda CB750 in 1969 marked a dramatic increase in the power and speed of practical and affordable sport bikes available to the general public.

This was followed in the 1970s by improvements in suspension and braking commensurate with the power of the large inline fours that had begun to dominate the sport bike world. In the 1980s sport bikes again took a leap ahead, becoming almost indistinguishable from racing motorcycles. Since the 1990s sport bikes have become more diverse, adding new variations like the naked bike and streetfighter to the more familiar road racing style of sport bike.

== Design elements ==
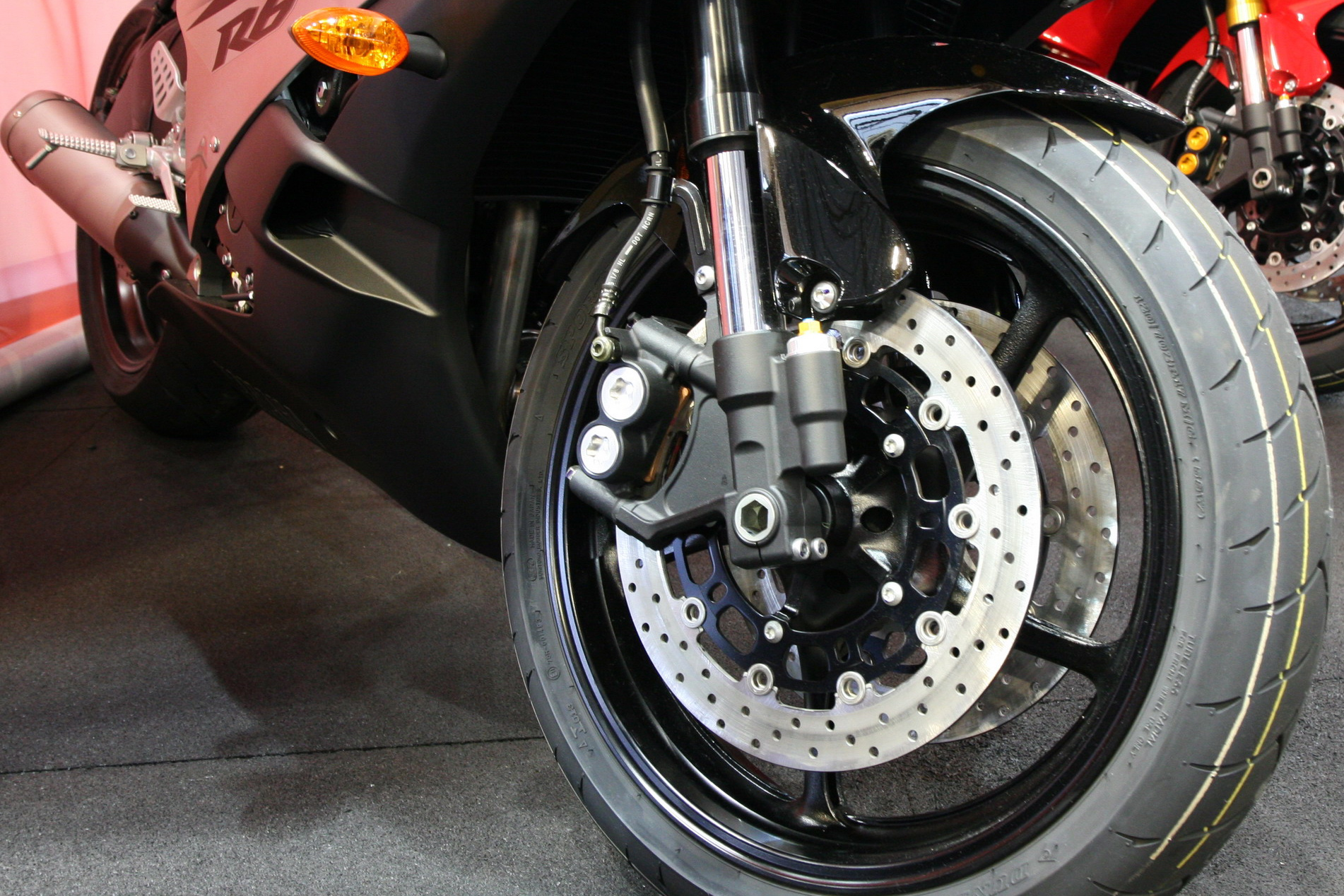
Dual front disc brakes with four piston radial calipers on a Yamaha YZF-R6.

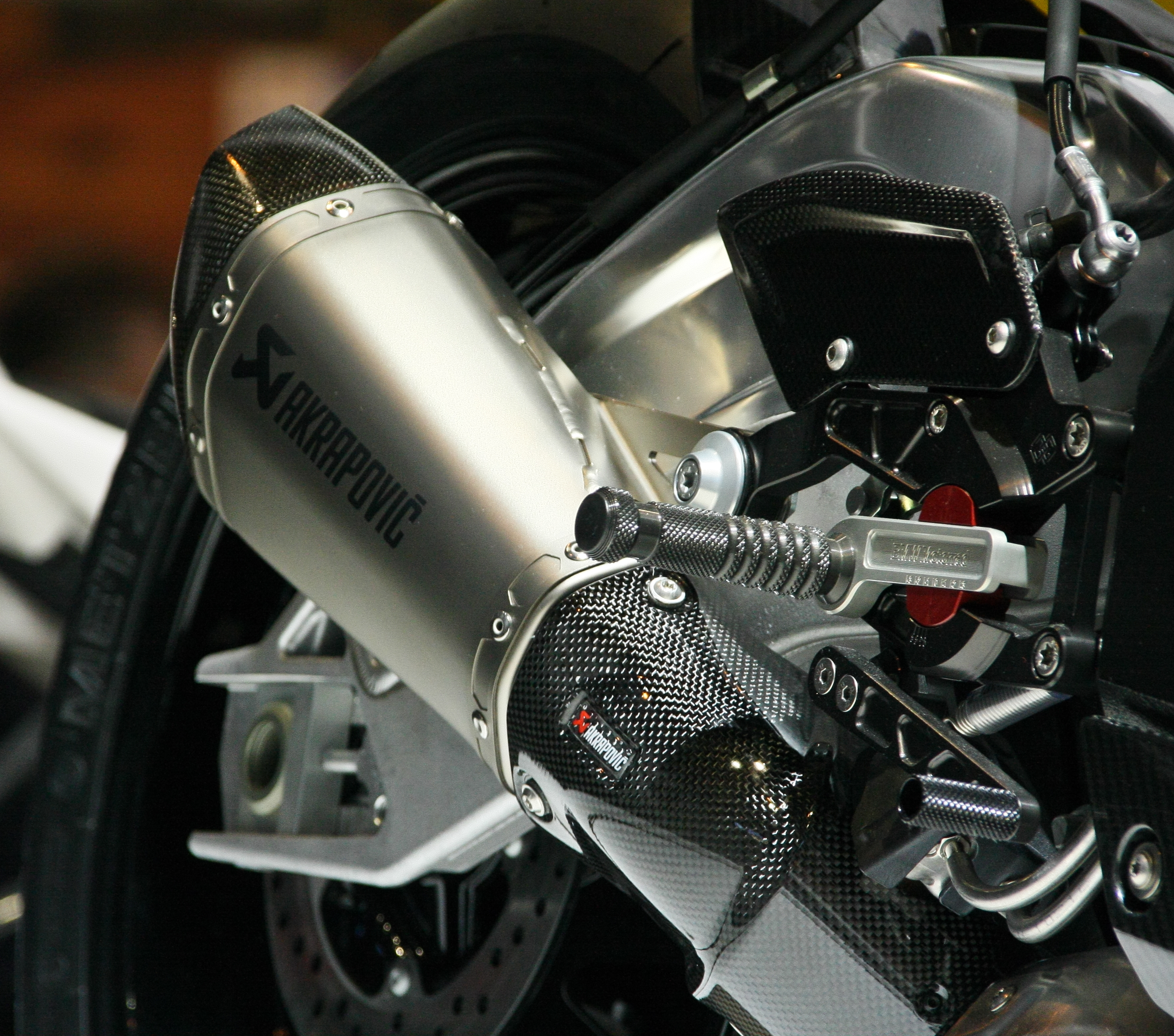
Aftermarket upgrades using carbon fiber or other exotic materials are used on sport bikes to enhance the power-to-weight ratio and handling.

With the emphasis of a sport bike being on speed, acceleration, braking, and maneuverability, there are certain design elements that most motorcycles of this type will share. Rider ergonomics favor function. This generally means higher foot pegs that move the legs closer to the body and more of a reach to a lower set of hand controls, such as clip on handlebars, which positions the body and weight forward and over the tank. Sport bikes have comparatively high-performance engines resting inside a lightweight frame. High tech and expensive materials are often used on sport bikes to reduce weight.

Braking systems combine higher performance brake pads and disc brakes with multi-piston calipers that clamp onto oversized vented rotors. Suspension systems are advanced in terms of adjustments and materials for increased stability and durability. Front and rear tires are larger and wider than tires found on other types of motorcycles to allow higher cornering speeds and greater lean angles. Fairings may or may not be used on a sport bike; when used, fairings are shaped to reduce aerodynamic drag as much as possible and provide wind protection for the rider.

The combination of rider position, location of the engine and other heavy components, and the motorcycle's geometry help maintain structural integrity and chassis rigidity, and determine how it will behave under acceleration, braking, and cornering. Correct front-to-rear weight distribution is of particular importance to the handling of sport bikes, and the changing position of the rider's body dynamically changes the handling of the motorcycle. Because of the complexity of modeling all the possible movements of different sized riders, to approach perfect tuning of a motorcycle's weight distribution and suspension is often only possible by having a bike customized or at least adjusted to fit a specific rider. Generally, road racing style sport bikes have shorter wheelbases than those intended for more comfortable touring, and the current trend in sport bike design is towards shorter wheelbases, giving quicker turning at the expense of a greater tendency for unintentional wheelies and stoppies under hard acceleration and braking, respectively. Some motorcycles have anti-wheelie systems, with various designs including computerized traction and suspension settings controls or mechanical suspension features, which are intended to reduce the lift and loss of traction of the front wheel under acceleration.

== Classes ==
There is no universal authority defining the terminology of sport bikes or any other motorcycle classes. Legal definitions are limited by local jurisdiction, and race sanctioning bodies like the American Motorcyclist Association (AMA) and the Fédération Internationale de Motocyclisme (FIM) set rules that only apply to those who choose to participate in their competitions. Nonetheless, by present day standards in Europe, North America and the rest of the developed world, sport bikes are usually divided into three, four, or five rough categories, reflecting vaguely similar engine displacement, horsepower, price and intended use, with a good measure of subjective opinion and simplification. Marketing messages about a model from the manufacturer can diverge from the consensus of the motorcycling media and the public. Sometimes the classes used in motorcycle racing are approximated in production models, often but not always in connection with homologation.

The sport bike classes in common usage are:

- Lightweight: also called entry level or beginner bikes. Some two strokes in this class have dramatically higher performance than the four strokes, being likened to miniature superbikes. Sport bikes with engine displacements of up to about 600 cc (37 cu in) are usually in this class.
- Middleweight: mid-sized, mid-level, or supersport bike. Some of the models in this range qualify for racing in the classes AMA Supersport Championship, British Supersport Championship and the Supersport World Championship, but many middleweights do not have a significant presence in racing. Displacements of 600–1,000 cc (37–61 cu in) are typical.
- Superbike: liter-class, literbike, or heavyweight i.e. 1,000 cc (61 cu in) or higher. As with supersport, many of the models in this class compete in superbike racing.
  - Open class, hypersport or hyperbike, are terms sometimes used in lieu of superbike as a catch-all for everything larger than middleweight. Alternatively, these terms mark a class above the superbikes for the largest displacement sport bikes with the highest top speeds, with weights somewhat greater than the superbike class. Hyperbike was in use by 1979.
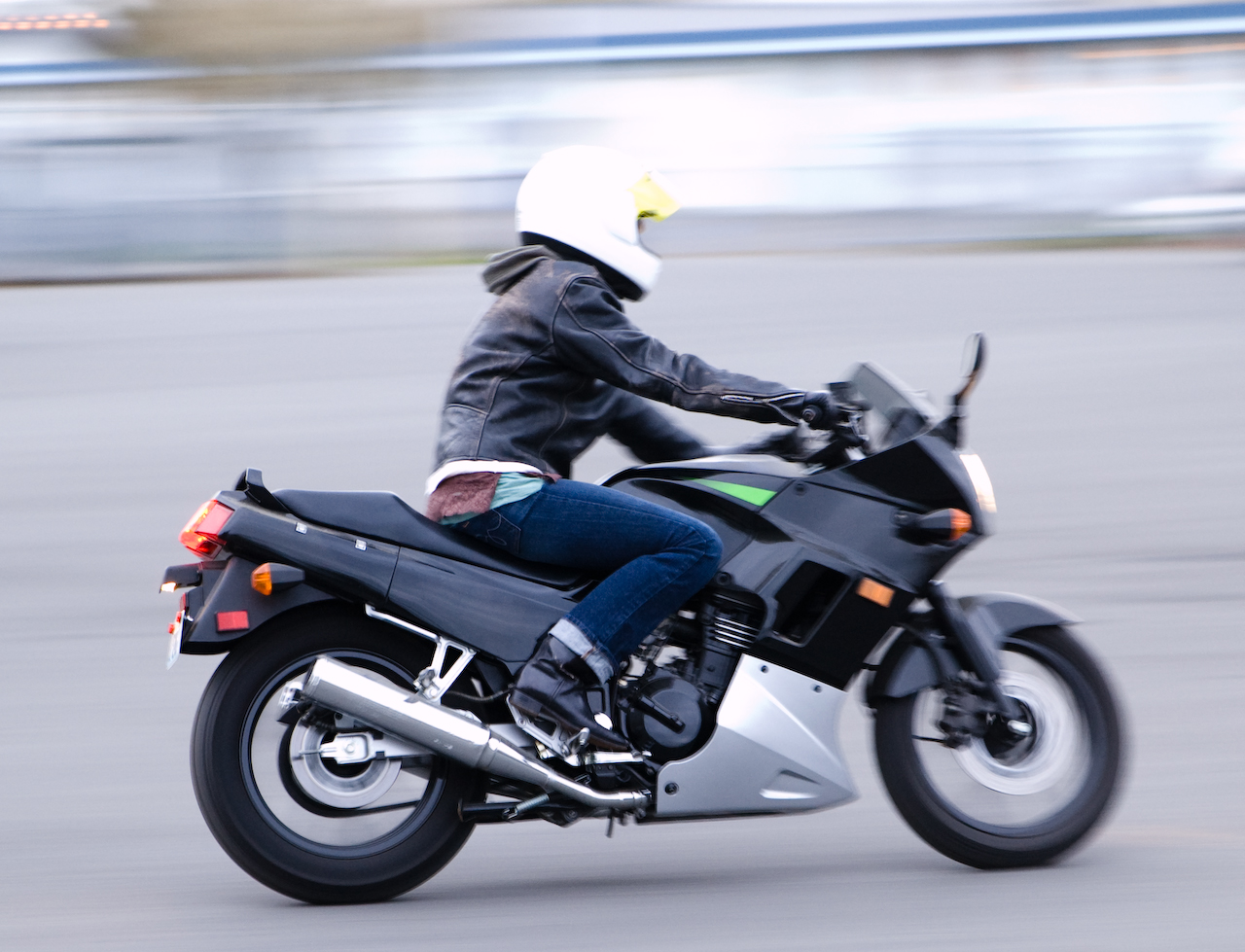
The Kawasaki Ninja 250R lightweight sport bike.

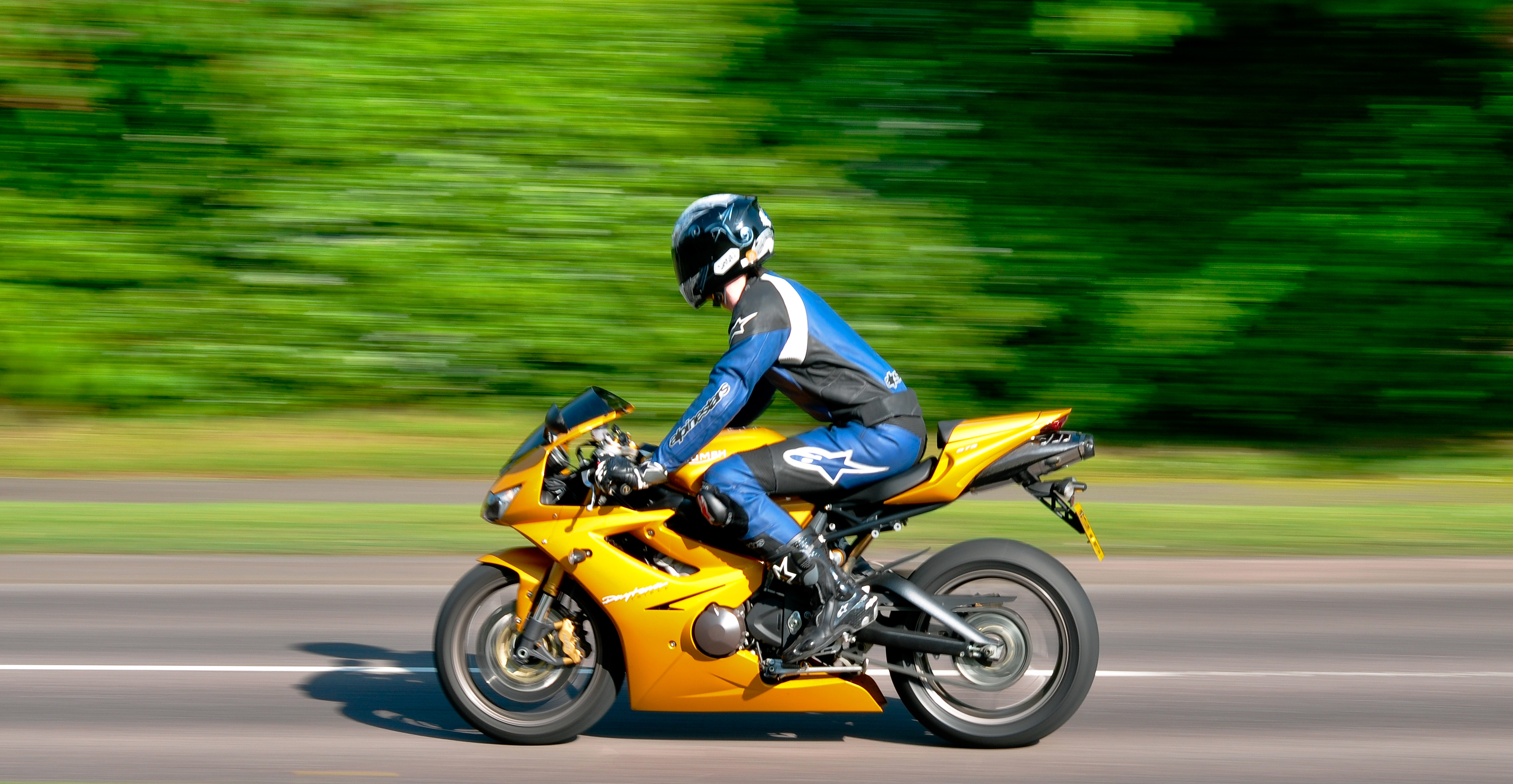
The Triumph Daytona 675 triple is usually classed as a middleweight or supersport.

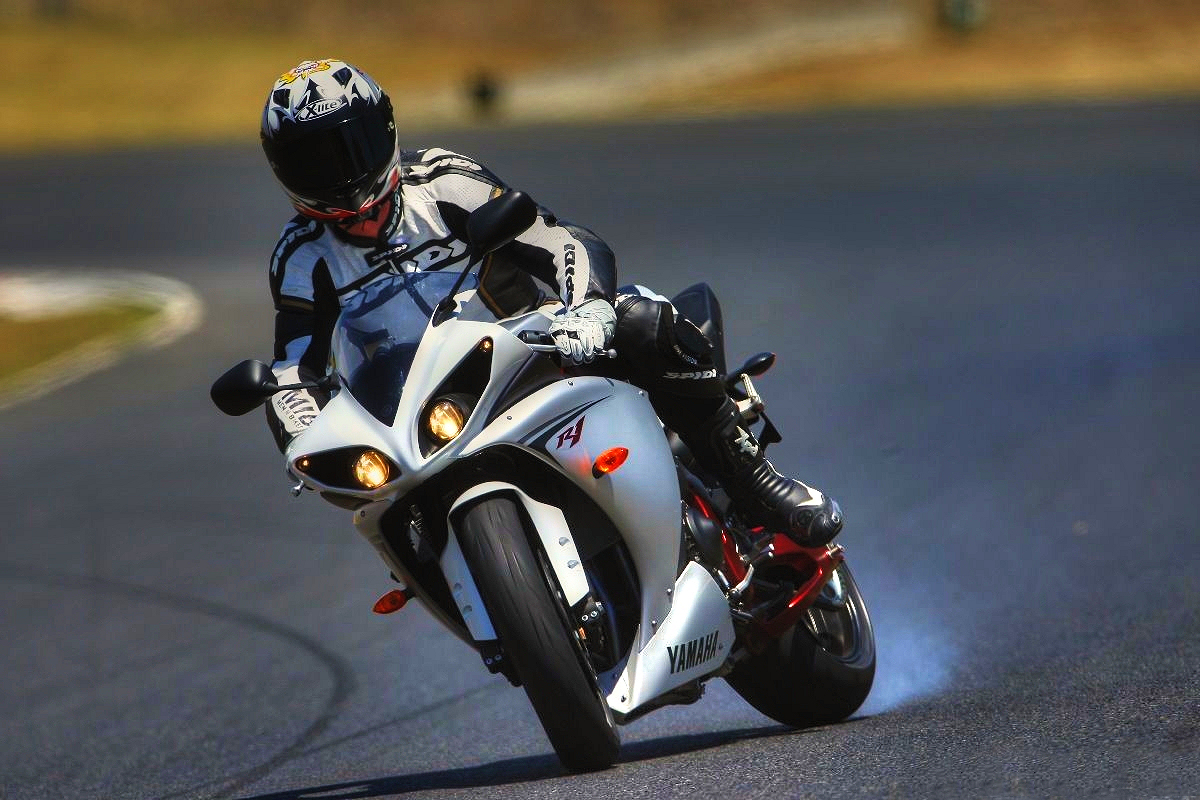
A Yamaha YZF-R1 998 cc (60.9 cu in) superbike.

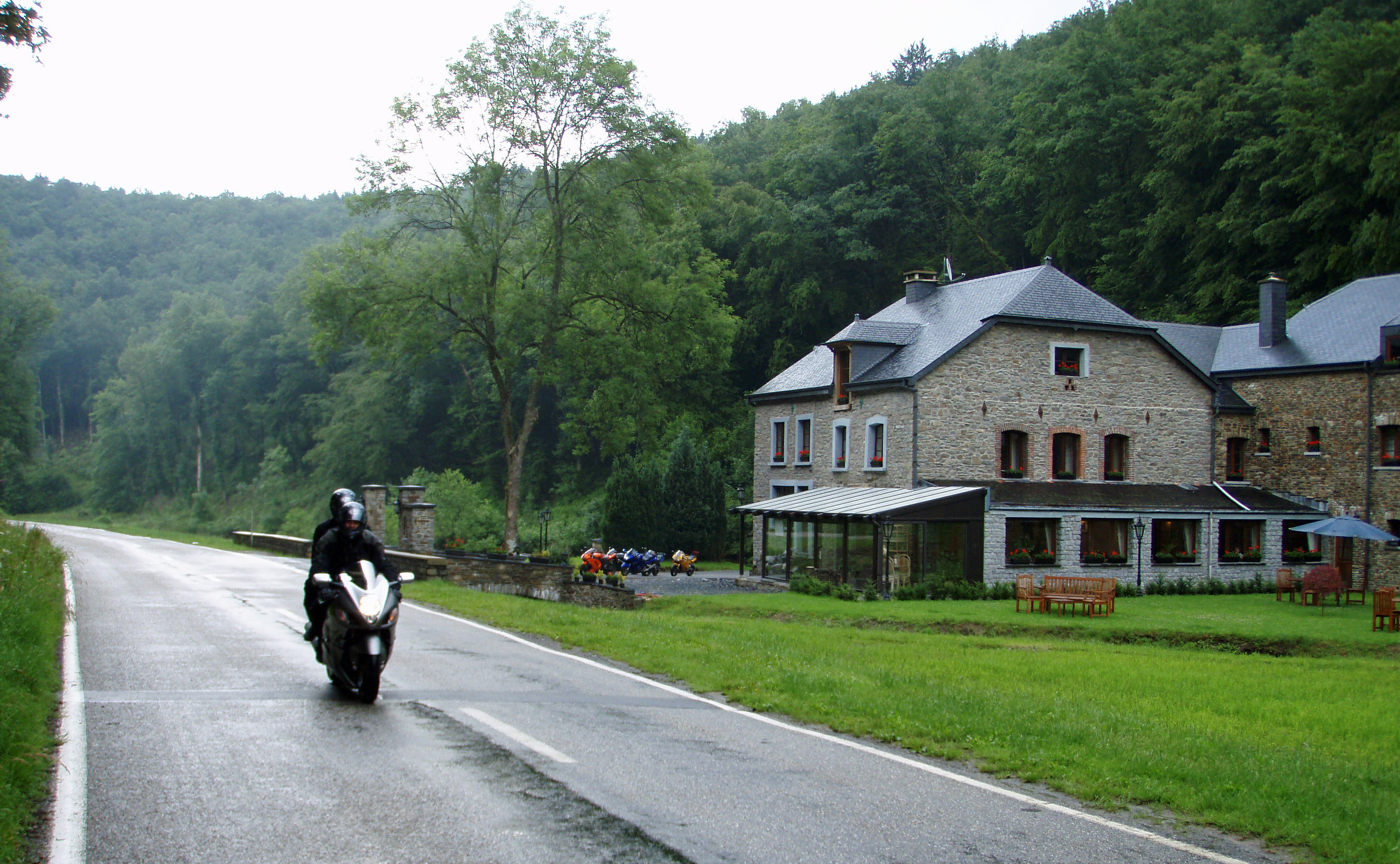
Touring with a passenger on an open class Suzuki Hayabusa.

The terms supersport and superbike are sometimes applied indiscriminately to all high-performance motorcycles. Categorization by engine displacement alone is a crude measure, particularly when comparing engines with different numbers of cylinders like inline or V fours with parallel and V twins, not to mention the greater power for a given displacement of two-stroke engines over four strokes.

In the less developed world, smaller engine sizes are the norm, and relative terms like small, mid-sized and large displacement can have different meanings. For example, in India in 2002 there were about 37 million two-wheelers, but as of 2008, there were only about 3,000 motorcycles, or fewer than one in 12,000, of displacement 1,000 cc (61 cu in) or more. Similarly, the perception of relative sizes has shifted over time in developed countries, from smaller to larger displacements. When the original superbike, the Honda CB750, appeared in 1969, it was called a "big four," while today an inline four of 736.5 cc (44.94 cu in) would be classed in the middle range.

Besides having product lines that span from entry level through high end sport bikes, many manufacturers add depth to that line by having pairs, or several pairs, of similar sport bikes aimed at riders of different levels. These are designed to appeal to riders seeking more or less extreme performance features. The more expensive model will be in the vein of a race replica, offering the latest technology updated with frequent design revisions, while the lower cost model typically relies on older technology, can have a more relaxed riding position, and is generally more practical for non-road racing tasks such as urban commuting and carrying passengers or baggage, and offering lower fuel, insurance and maintenance costs. Examples of these paired models are Buell's Firebolt and Lightning, Ducati's 916/748 through 1198/848 paired series, Honda's CBR600RR and F4i middleweights and RC51 and CBR1000RR liter-class, several different concurrent models in Kawasaki's Ninja line, and Yamaha's R6 and 600R.

=== Variations ===
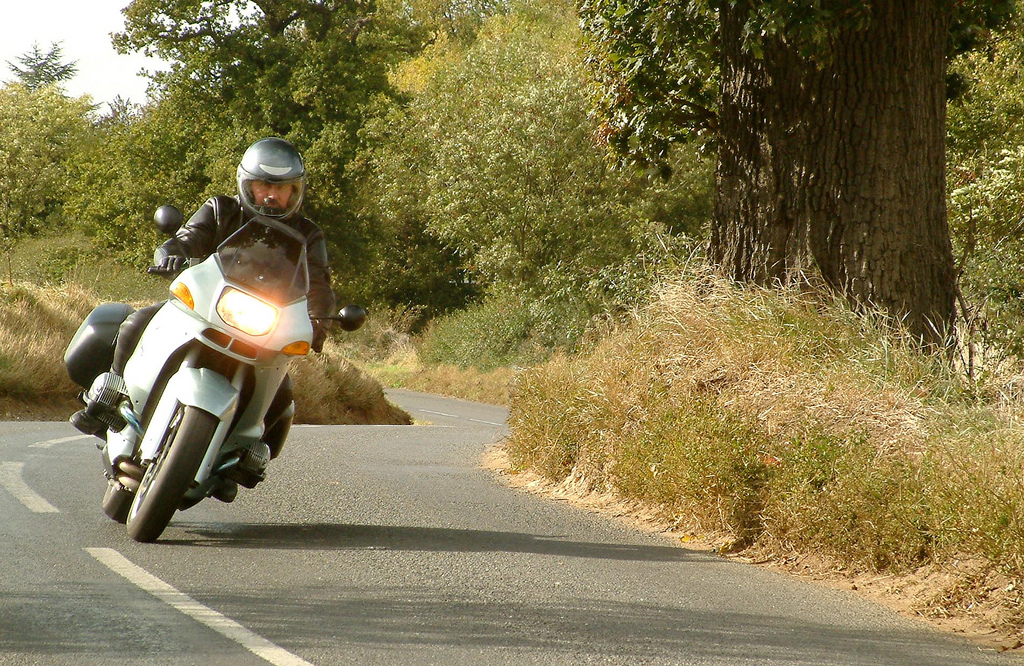
A BMW R1100RS sport-touring motorcycle.

Sport touring motorcycles share many features of sport bikes, but they are generally considered a class all their own. These are mid- to large-sized motorcycles that offer more carrying capacity, more relaxed ergonomics, and more versatility than specialized sport bikes, while being lighter and more agile than touring motorcycles.

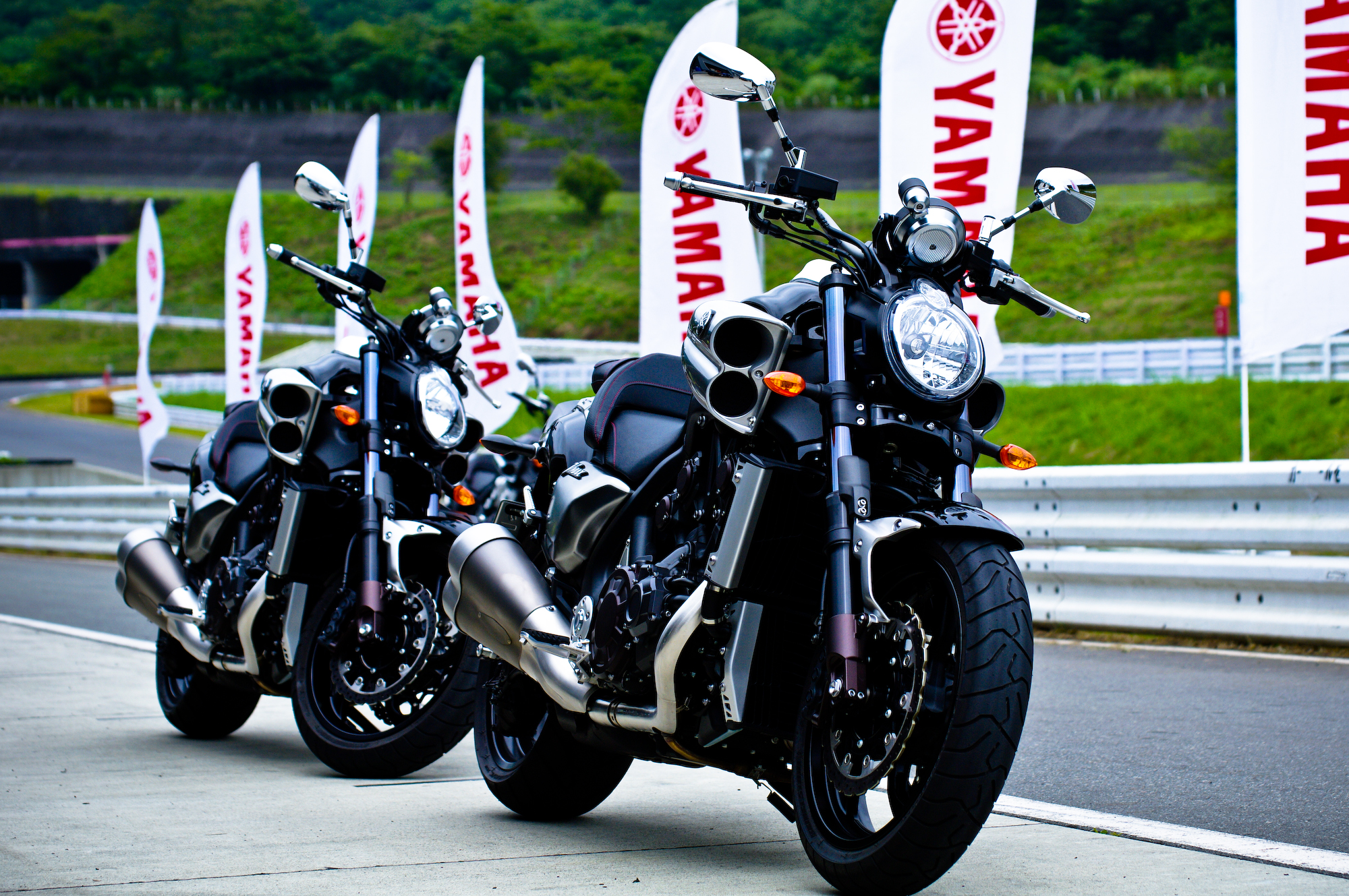
The Yamaha V-Max power cruiser.

Some sport bikes are marketed as race replicas, implying that the model sold to the public is identical to the one used in racing, or at least is closer to the racing version than non-replica models. Suffixes R or RR applied to model codes can be interpreted as standing for replica or race replica. Race Replica was used in the late 1970s UK where 250 cc models customized with full bodykits providing race-styling in factory team colors themed to the top-level of sponsored riders of the time were available marketed towards 'learner' riders who had not passed a driving test enabling their progression to large-capacity machines. In 1982 Yamaha described their 1983 RD350 YPVS launched at the Cologne motorcycle show as "the nearest thing to a road going racer ever produced".

The term race replica was then also used to distinguish the period of sport bike production from Japan and Europe since the mid-1980s having integrated race-styled bodywork, representing an evolution from the superbike period that began in 1969. The sport bike, or race replica, era began with the 1983 Suzuki RG250 Gamma, the 1984 Honda VF750F and the 1985 Suzuki GSX-R750, and had full fairings.

naked bikes or streetfighters are sport bikes with small or no fairings. These variants have proliferated since the mid-1990s. They retain many of the performance features of other sport bikes, but besides abbreviated bodywork, they give the rider a more upright posture by using, for example, higher handlebars instead of clip ons. The streetfighter name, associated with motorcycle stunt riding and perhaps hooliganism on public roads, can imply higher performance than the sometimes more tame naked bike, which in some cases is a synonym for a standard motorcycle. Others define naked bikes as equal in power and performance to sport bikes, merely absent the bodywork.

The same period that saw the naked and streetfighter variants of the sport bike theme also had a resurgence of the versatile standard in response to demand for a return of the Universal Japanese Motorcycle. Supermoto-style street bikes, constructed with a completely different set of priorities than a road racing style sport bike, have also entered the mainstream, offering another option for riders seeking a spirited riding experience.

The nickname muscle bike has been applied to sport bikes that give engine output a disproportionate priority over braking, handling or aerodynamics, harking back to the Japanese superbikes of the 1970s. A similar sensibility drives the so-called power cruiser motorcycles, based on cruiser class machines but with horsepower numbers in league with superbikes.

== See also ==
- Sport moped
- Outline of motorcycles and motorcycling
