= Suzuki GSX series =

Range of motorcycles

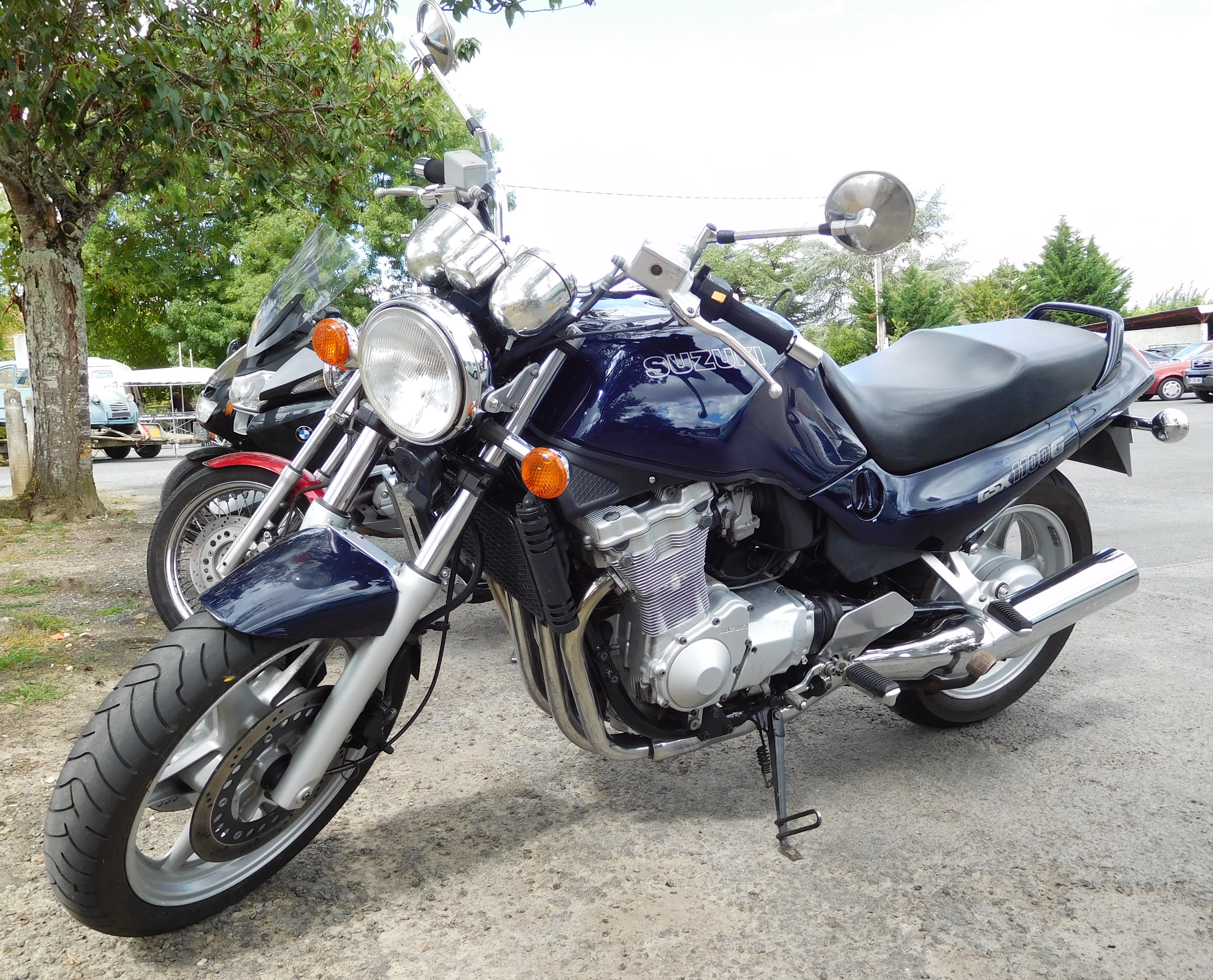
Suzuki GSX 1100

The GSX Series is Suzuki's range of sport touring motorcycles powered by four-valve per cylinder four-stroke engines. The first GSX models were introduced in 1980 and represented the next step in Suzuki's four-stroke road bike range after the two-valve GS Series.

In North America though, the Suzuki four-valve and two-valve four-stroke road bikes were both designated as Suzuki GS motorcycles.
The two-valve engines remained in production in parallel with the four-valve power plants, the larger two-valve four-cylinder engines gaining shaft-drive and being used to power Suzuki's more touring-orientated bikes such as the GS 850G and GS 1100G, while the GSX series represented performance orientation.

== GSX Development ==
The two-valve GS Series was Suzuki's first real foray into four-stroke motorcycles. Although Suzuki produced 90cc and 123cc four-stroke single cylinder road bikes under the brand Colleda in the mid-1950s, up until 1976 Suzuki was primarily a builder of two-stroke motorcycles. Suzuki's range of road going motorcycles was almost entirely two-stroke in the mid-1970s (the oddball being the Wankel Rotary powered RE-5). The sophisticated Suzuki GT series and the flagship 750cc water-cooled, posi-lube lubricated, three-cylinder two-stroke GT750 characterizing the breed. The GS750 introduced in 1976, along with the parallel-twin GS400, was Suzuki's first large multi-cylinder four-stroke motorcycle. The GS was Suzuki's version of what was and is referred to as a Universal Japanese Motorcycle, so common was this 4-cylinder four-stroke configuration amongst the Japanese manufacturers at the time. The 63 bhp air-cooled, twin-cam, in-line four cylinder, GS750 road bike set the pattern for the GS/GSX range until the birth of the first of the race-replicas, the 1985 air/oil-cooled Suzuki GSX-R750. The GS750 two-valve engine showed the influence of Suzuki's long history of two-stroke design and manufacture; the new four-strokes sporting pressed together roller bearing crank-shafts universally used in two-stroke bottom ends.

=== Twin Swirl Combustion Chamber (TSCC) ===
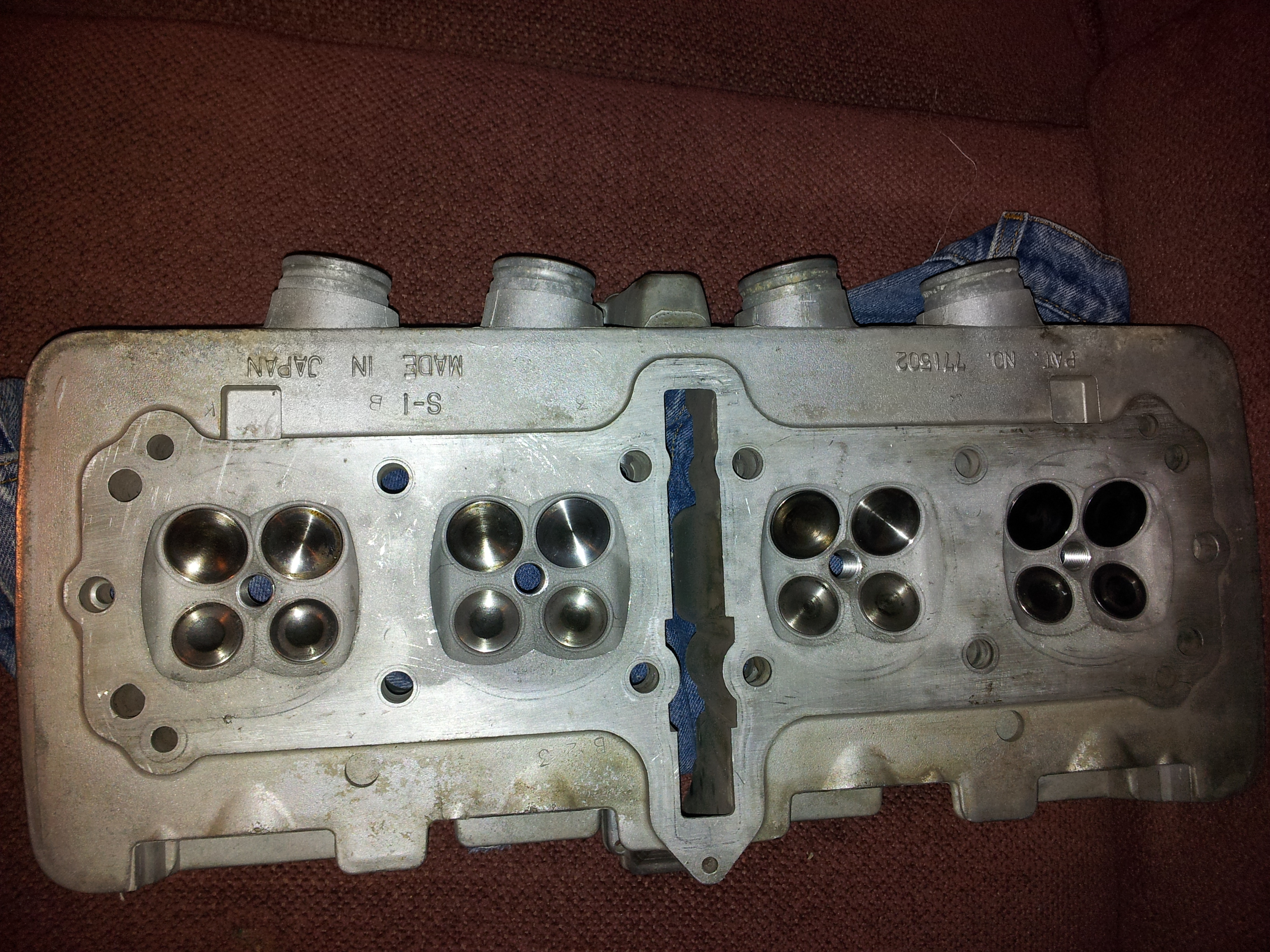
GSX1100 16-Valve head (GS1100)

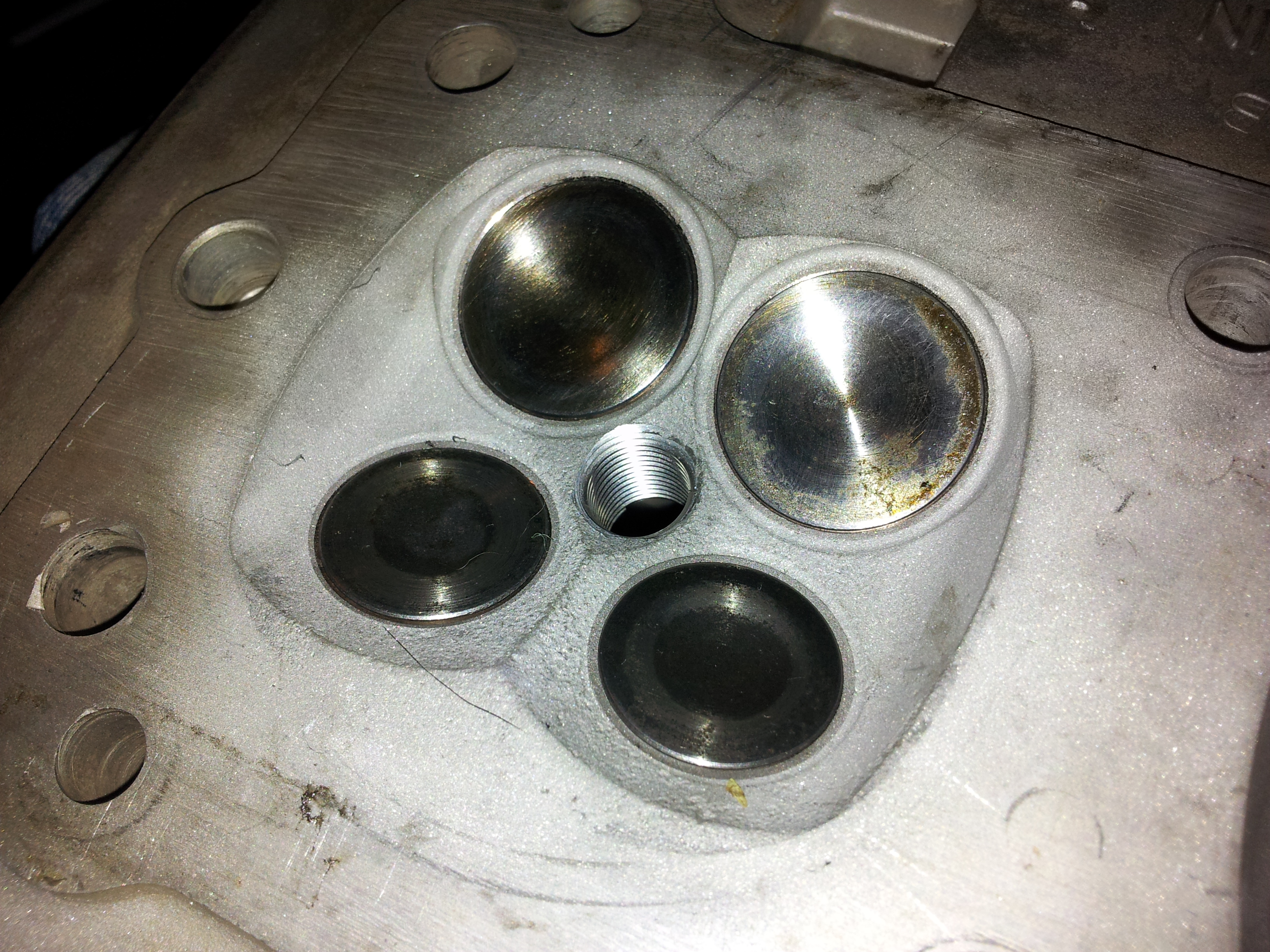
GSX1100 (GS1100) TSCC Detail

The key feature of the GSX engine was the change from the common two-valve per cylinder hemispherical combustion chamber with domed piston design of the GS engine, to a four-valve per cylinder Twin Swirl Combustion Chamber (TSCC) with flat topped piston design. The TSCC design was essentially a modification of the Pent-roof combustion chamber design to which was added a slightly raised ridge running along the combustion chamber roof parallel to the gas flow of the inlet charge. This was to encourage controlled swirl of the incoming fuel-air charge in order to increase the fuel burn speed through better flame front propagation. Squish areas were also provided to the front and rear of the combustion chambers. The higher burn speed, coupled with lowered heat loss from the shallower combustion chambers created by comparatively narrow included valve angles and the flat topped piston meant that the GSX engines produced more power and torque than the same sized GS mills.

The other major difference with the first GSX engines was the move from direct overhead cam actuation of the valve by shim and bucket of the GS engines, to valve actuation via short forked rocker arms in the GSX -the valves stems and springs being located inboard from the camshafts due to the reduced included angle between inlet and exhaust valves. Apart from the heads the GS/GSX engines were of a common design.

The current range of bikes by that name are completely different designs that use derivatives of former super sports engines from the early-to-middle GSX-R series.

== Early GSX ==
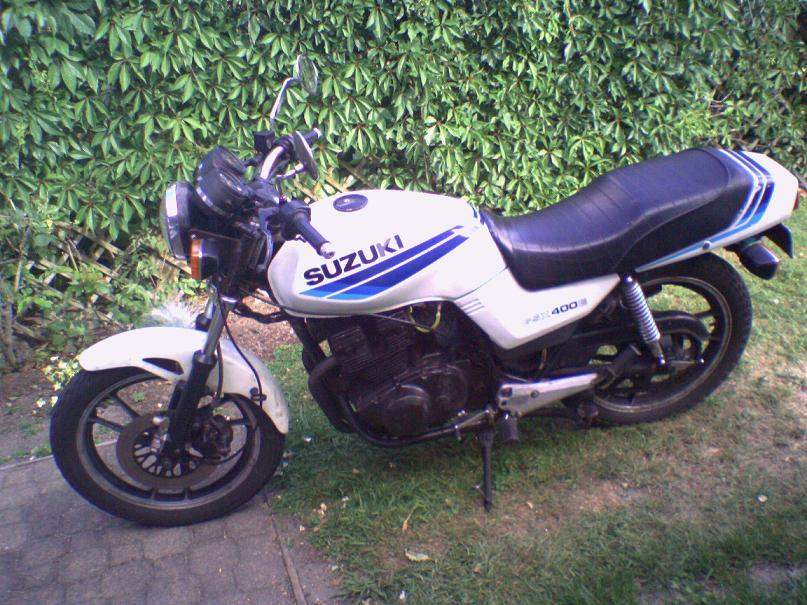
1983 Suzuki GSX 250E

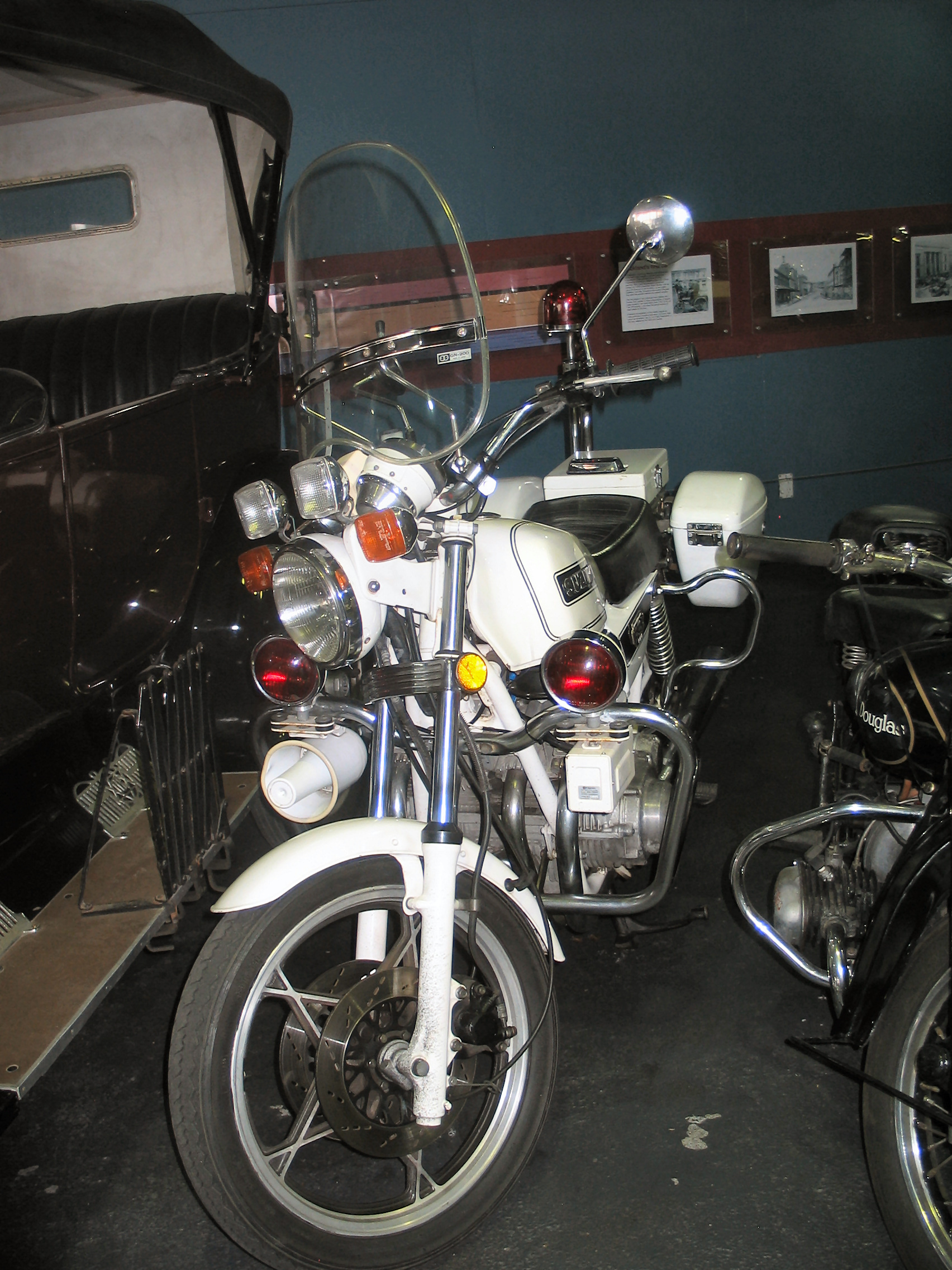
A 1982 GSX 750 used by the New Zealand Ministry of Transport

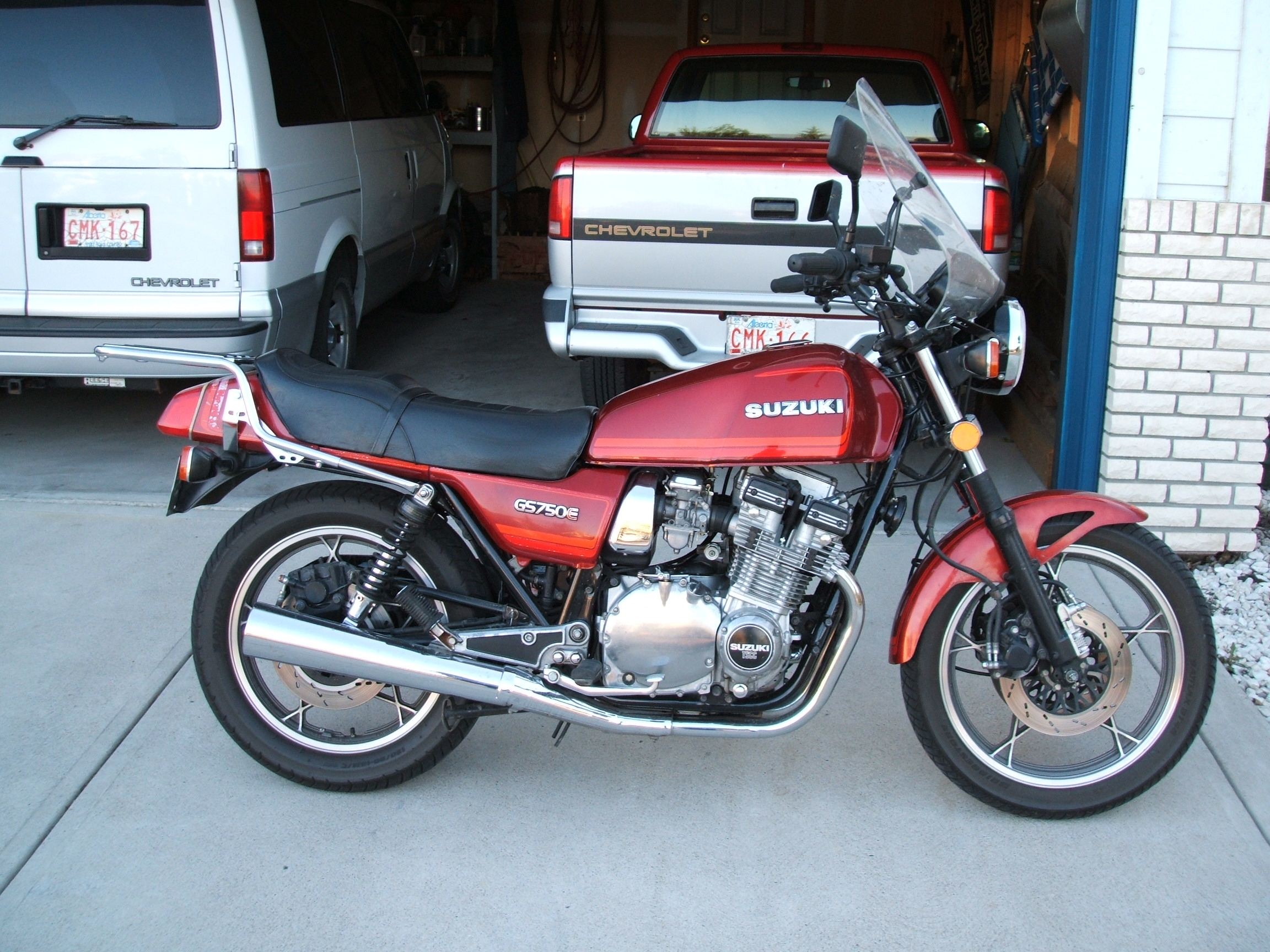
1982 GSX 750E all stock/original except aftermarket screen and parcel rack

Among the earliest GSX models were the two-cylinder GSX 250 and the GSX 400.

These Suzuki GSX models were the evolution of the GS series of two-valve-per-cylinder air and oil-cooled four-stroke motorcycles. The first four-valve engines were produced for the 1980 model year, but retained the "GS" designation for the US and Canadian markets until the release of the GSX-R models in 1986 (1985 outside the US). These GSX engines were based on Suzuki's "TSCC" (Twin-Swirl Combustion Chamber) engine design, and shared little with previous two-valve models. In 1999, only for the Asian market, the sport-touring Thunder GS 250 emerged. Subsequently, to be given the designation GSX in 2001. By 2005, that was then completely discontinued. The Suzuki Katana, which had the same "TSCC" engine design but, with the designation of GSX-S. Although, that had little in common with the more modern GSX-F Katanas which are, like the previously mentioned Thunder, sport-touring bikes.

The TSCC engine was once again redesigned in 1983 with the introduction of a completely new GSX 750, Suzuki's first modern mono-shocked sportbike in both a naked (GSX 750E) and half-faired (GSX 750ES) version. Although this bike received solid reviews from testing magazines (and came to be the testers' preferred 750 sport machine for the year), its release was an ill-timed duel against Honda's all-new V4 engine in the form of the VF750 Interceptor.

The 1983 GSX 750ES had air-adjustable anti-dive forks, preload and compression-adjustable rear mono-shock ("Full-Floater"), disc brakes at both ends, a fuel gauge and digital gear indicator. More significantly, the 83 GSX750 was Suzuki's first mass appeal motorcycle to sport a 16" front wheel in place of the previous models 19" wheel. The 16" wheel making its production debut on a Suzuki with the GS650 Turbo. The 16" front wheel was a development used in early to mid 1980s 500cc GP motorcycles at the time to quicken steering at high speeds by reducing the gyroscopic effect and shortening/widening the front tyre contact patch. On the road the 16" wheel proved unpopular and quickly fell out of favour due to its instability on bumpy road surfaces.

In 1984 the U.S. market received the GS 700 - a bike with a de-stroked engine and minor cosmetic differences due to the imposition by the U.S. Government of a 50% tariff on all imported motorcycles displacing more than 700cc (repealed in 1988). All other markets continued to receive 750cc models. Modifications in 700cc guise included taller pistons and slightly differing cam lift and timing. This plus a change in factory gear ratios enabled Suzuki to produce a US-only motorcycle with near-identical performance specifications to the GSX 750ES, even though engine displacement was 15 per cent smaller. The 50 per cent tariff was the reason behind the glut of de-stroked 650 cc and 700 cc Japanese motorcycles sold in the US in the mid-1980s - unique to the U.S. - and is also the reason the GSX-R debuted in the U.S. a full year later than the rest of the world. It was available as the naked GS 700E and as the GS 700ES with bikini fairing.

Outside the US market the GSX 750S Katana was completely restyled in 1984 sharing the same engine and 16" front wheel chassis of the ES. 1984 also saw the release of completely new GSX-R 750 signaled a new direction of race-replica sport bikes. The GSX range being relegated from the role of flag-ship models in the Suzuki range. 1984 also saw an update in color schemes for the GSX 750ES in the rest of the world, with the naked "E" being dropped in favor of the half-faired "ES" and a new "EF" model with full upper and lower sport fairings (never available as a factory option in the US).

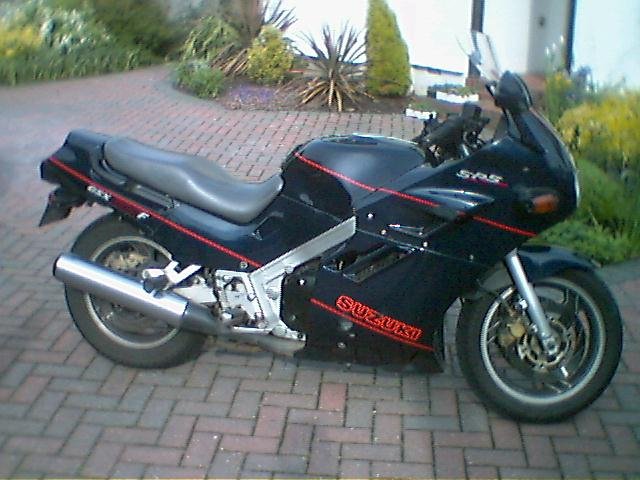
The Suzuki GSX 1100F

The GSX 750E lived on for a few more years, but was eventually superseded by the sport-touring orientated GSX-F series, marketed in the US as Katanas. The original Hans Muth designed GSX-S Katanas were also dropped from Suzuki's global lineup by the mid-1980s, with sporting/racing duties better served by the lighter SACs (Suzuki Advanced Cooling System) air/oil-cooled GSX-Rs. The GSX 1100 lived on with significant styling changes for the 1984 model year with the addition of a 16" front end, including a full-faired 124 bhp monster of a musclebike, the GSX 1100EFE (US: GS1150EF). The larger bikes, although still sought after as classic superbikes, were also replaced by the GSX-F (Katana in North America only) lineups, based on detuned GSX-R engines with significant body styling changes such as an electrically operated screen in the 1100F, upgraded suspension and braking components, and frame revisions.

== Current GSX ==
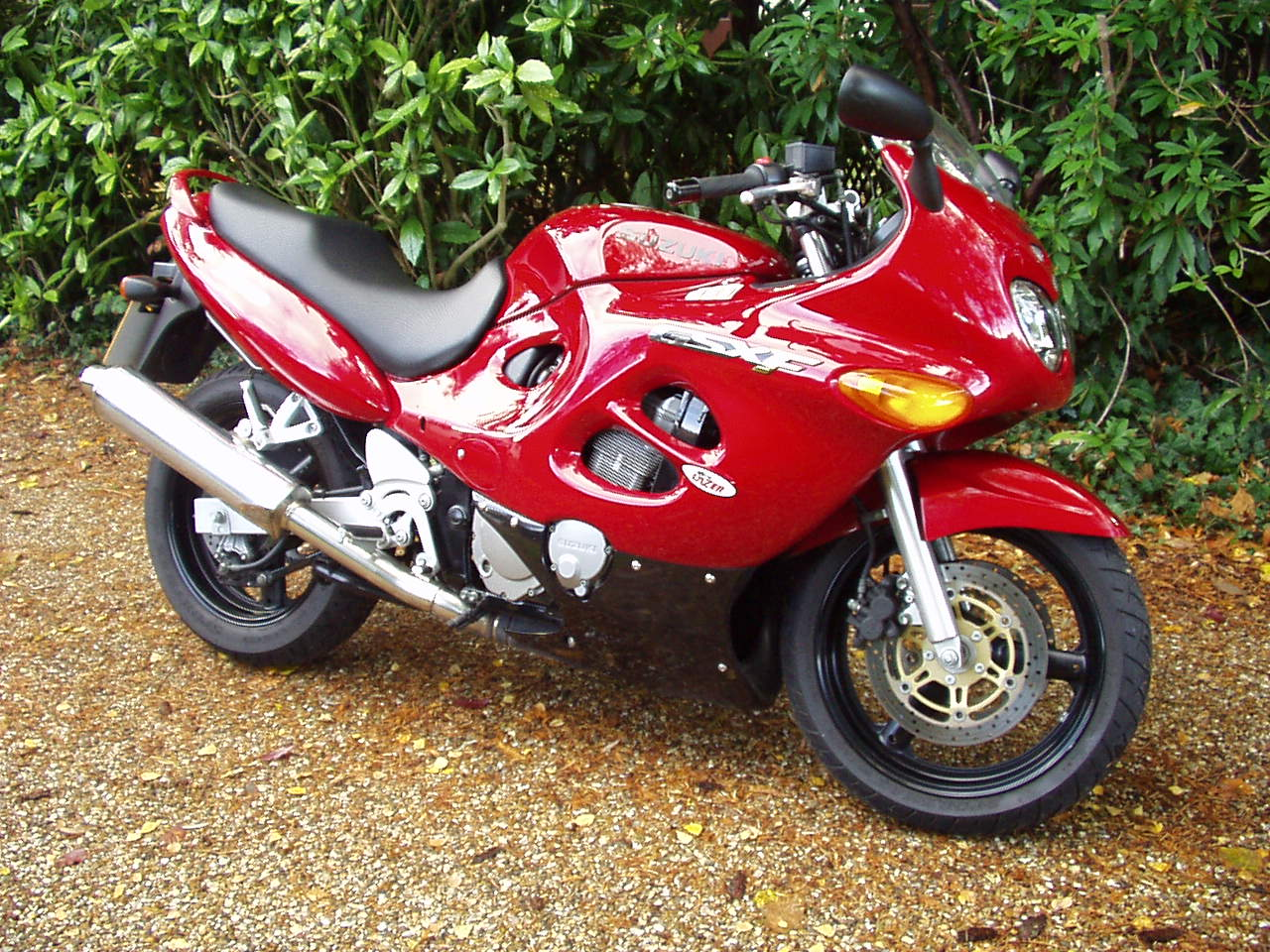
Suzuki GSX 750F

The GSX 750S received an updated engine for 1984, along with Suzuki's other big-bore four-valver models. This is the engine that the first Suzuki GSX-R Series bikes were based on.

The current GSX models are powered by derivatives of this in-line, four-cylinder engine with four valves per cylinder, which is also used in the Suzuki Bandit Series up to the end of the 2006 model year. They feature a combined air/oil cooling system called SACS (for 'Suzuki Advanced Cooling System').

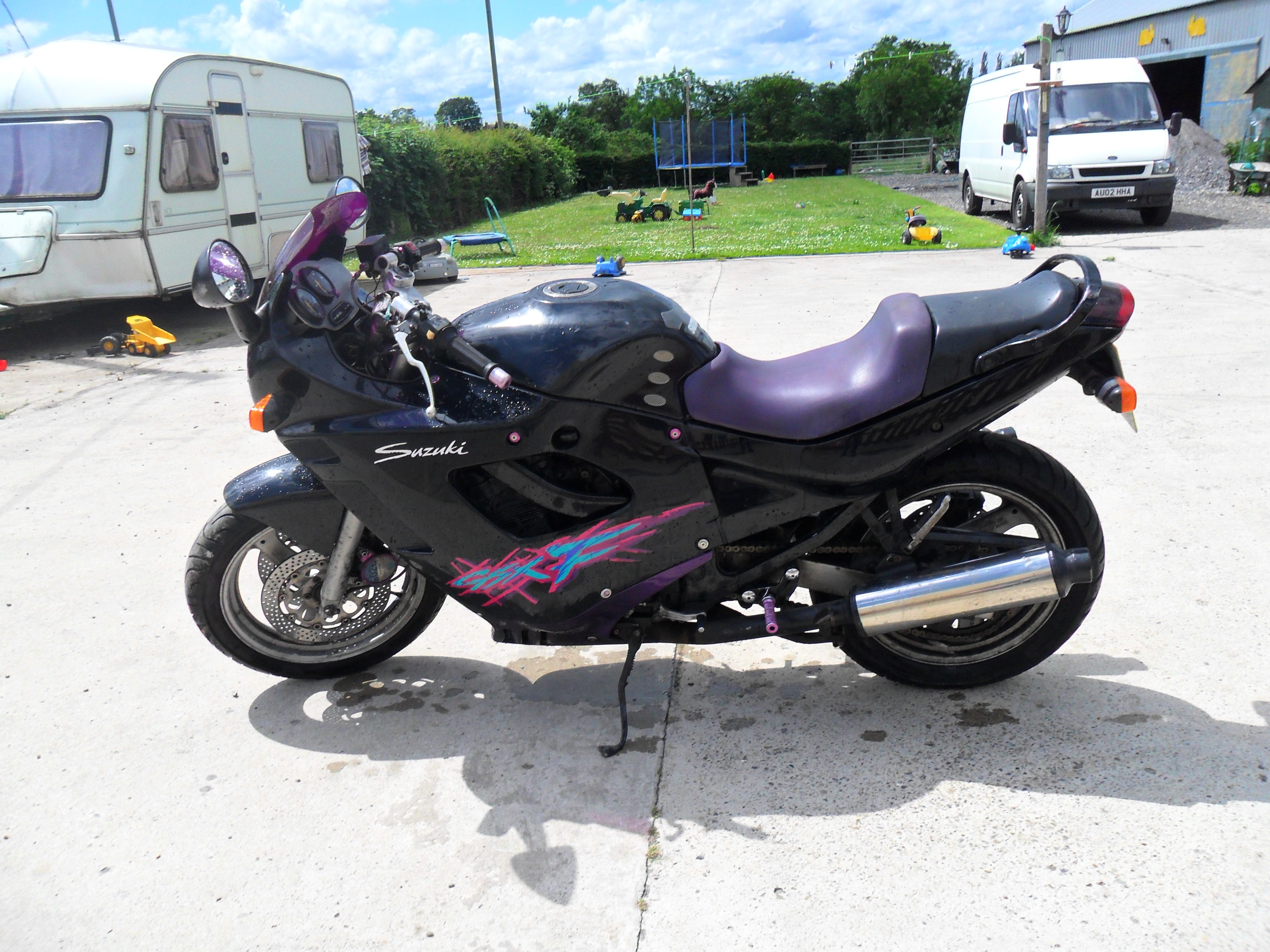
Suzuki GSX 600F

The current GSX series is produced as the GSX600F and GSX750F faired sport touring models, now in their second generations, and the unfaired, twin-shock GSX 750 and GSX 1400 models.

The bike was used to win the 2007 Endurance FIM World Championship.

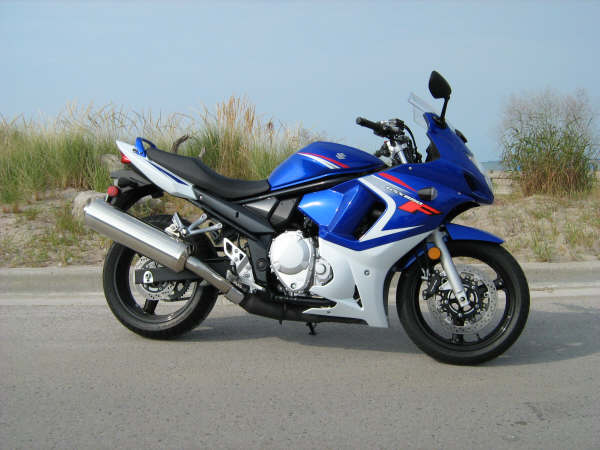
Suzuki GSX 650F

The GSX650F, produced from 2008, is essentially a variation on the Bandit 650, with much the same specification and components. The additional lower fairing, however, gives it a sportier look similar to that of the Suzuki GSX-R Series (though the Bandit chassis means that it carries 110 lb extra weight compared with a GSX-R), the engine has had a small amount of remapping to encourage revs, and the suspension is tweaked. It also has a one-piece seat, unlike the Bandit.

The earlier GSX750 and GSX1200 Inazuma (GSX750W and GSX1200W) were offered in Japan and Europe for a short time besides the GSF1200 Bandit to cater for a clientele that went for a more traditional styling and a somewhat higher build quality. When they proved sufficiently popular for overseas export, they were quickly developed into the current GSX 1400.

These modern non-US GSX-models carry little in common with their early to mid-eighties cousins other than a distant ancestor in their powerplant. The GSX 1100S Katana has been reissued as an anniversary model several times for the Japanese domestic market (where the GSX 400S Katana remains a very popular model with styling straight from the early-1980s), and Yoshimura has recently released a small handful of fully re-worked factory GSX 1100S Katana models for sale, requiring potential buyers to win an essay contest before being granted the opportunity to purchase one of these bikes.

The GSX 250F is known as the Suzuki Across and is notable as it has a rear petrol tank and a helmet storage area where the petrol tank usually is.

== List of models ==
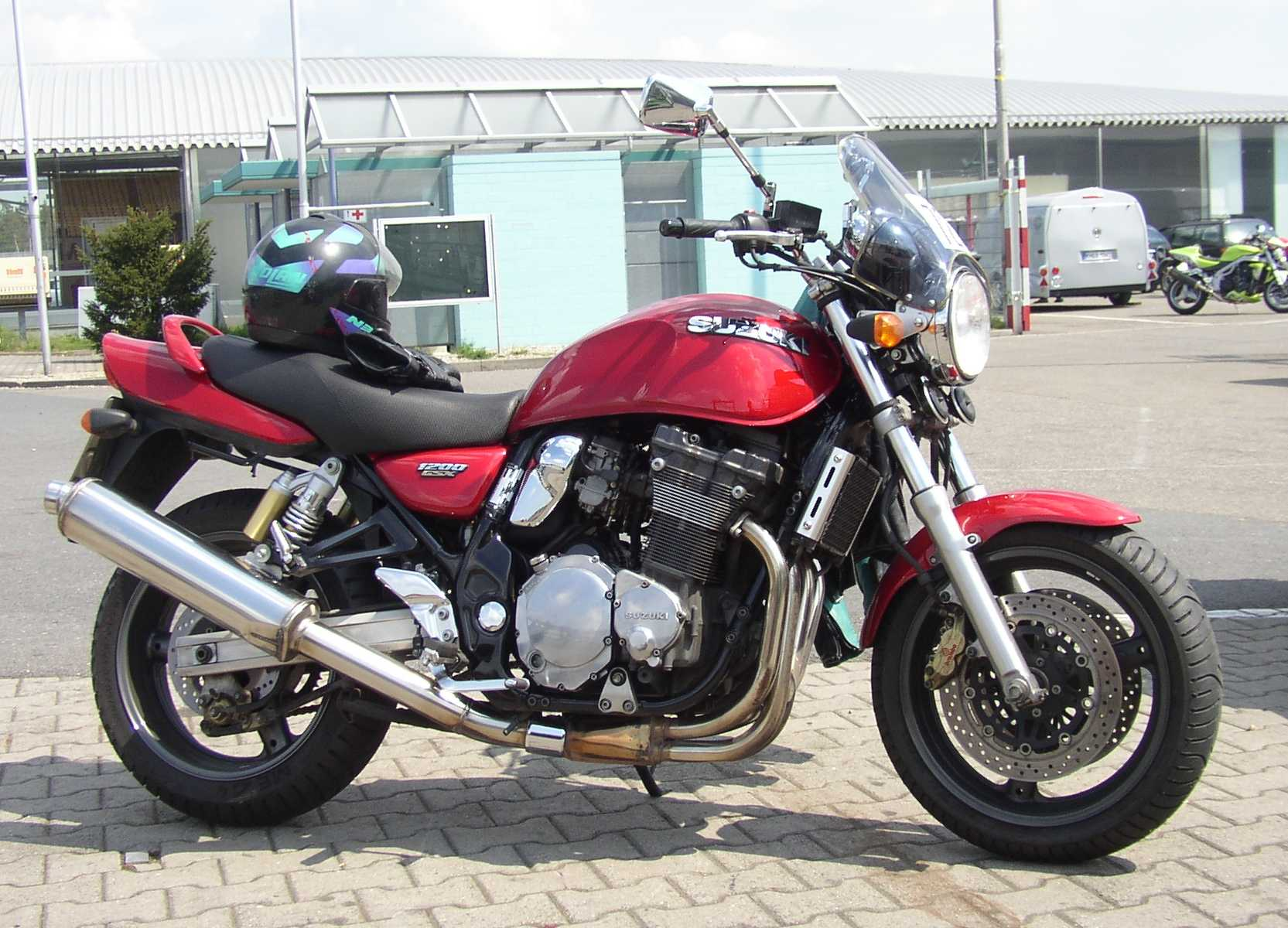
Suzuki GSX 1200

- GSX 125
- GSX 250
- GSX 250F Across
- GSX 400
- GSX 550
- GSX 600F
- GSX 650F
- GSX 700
- GSX 750
- GSX 750F
- GSX 1000
- GSX 1100
- GSX 1100F
- GSX 1200 Inazuma
- GSX 1400

== See also ==
- Suzuki GSX250R
