= Crossflow cylinder head =

Internal combustion engine design

A crossflow cylinder head is a cylinder head that features the intake and exhaust ports on opposite sides. The gases can be thought to flow across the head. This is in contrast to reverse-flow cylinder head designs that have the ports on the same side.

Crossflow heads use overhead valves, but these can be actuated either by overhead camshafts, or by a valve-train, which has the camshafts in the cylinder block, and actuates the valves with push rods and rockers.

== Advantages ==
A crossflow head gives better performance than a Reverse-flow cylinder head (though not as good as a uniflow), but the popular explanation put forward for this — that the gases do not have to change direction and hence are moved into and out of the cylinder more efficiently — is a simplification since there is no continuous flow because of valve opening and closing. But since there is overlap between the intake and exhaust profiles there is a point in which both valves are open. At that point the inertia of the exhaust gases leaving the cylinder helps to aspirate the intake gases into the cylinder. The other main reason for the better performance of crossflow is that the ports and valves can be larger and its physical separation of the hot exhaust manifold keeps the air in the intake manifold cooler. Most modern engines are of a crossflow design. The engineering terminology for these benefits is greater volumetric efficiency.

Crossflow cylinder head, with twin overhead cams

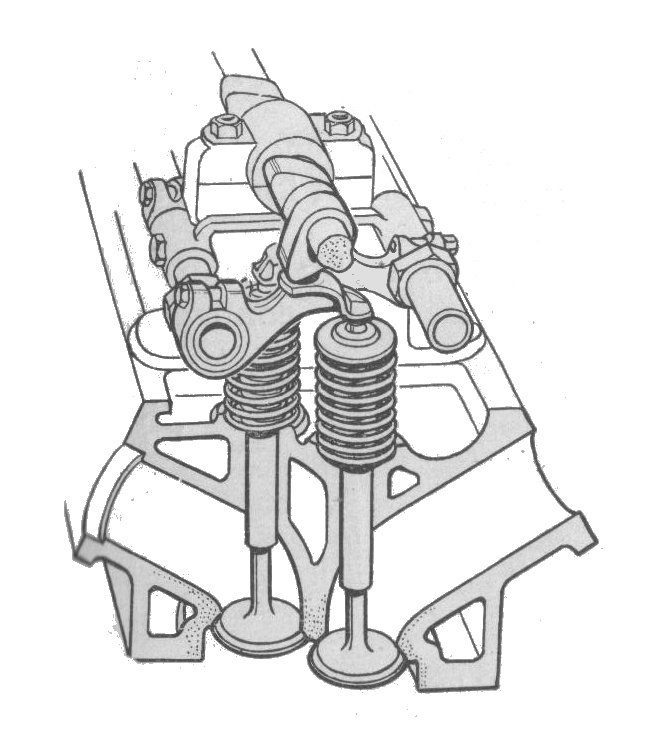
Cutaway view of the overhead camshaft, rockers and valves of a crossflow cylinder head

Cross-section of a four-stroke engine showing the flow of gases across the cylinder head from the inlet port on the right to the exhaust port on the left, via the combustion chamber

== Examples ==
In the UK, "Crossflow" is also used to refer specifically to Ford Motor Company's Kent Crossflow four-cylinder overhead valve engine, and its short-block "Valencia" derivative which has been used in cars from the 1960s up to the present day, albeit with the addition of fuel injection and a modern engine management system. The term was also briefly used in the early 1980s in Australia for the revised 4.1 litre inline six-cylinder engine in Ford's Australian large family car, the Falcon. This was in response to the post-1979 fuel crisis where the Falcon was a comparatively fuel-inefficient car compared to its contemporary rivals.

== Four valve heads ==
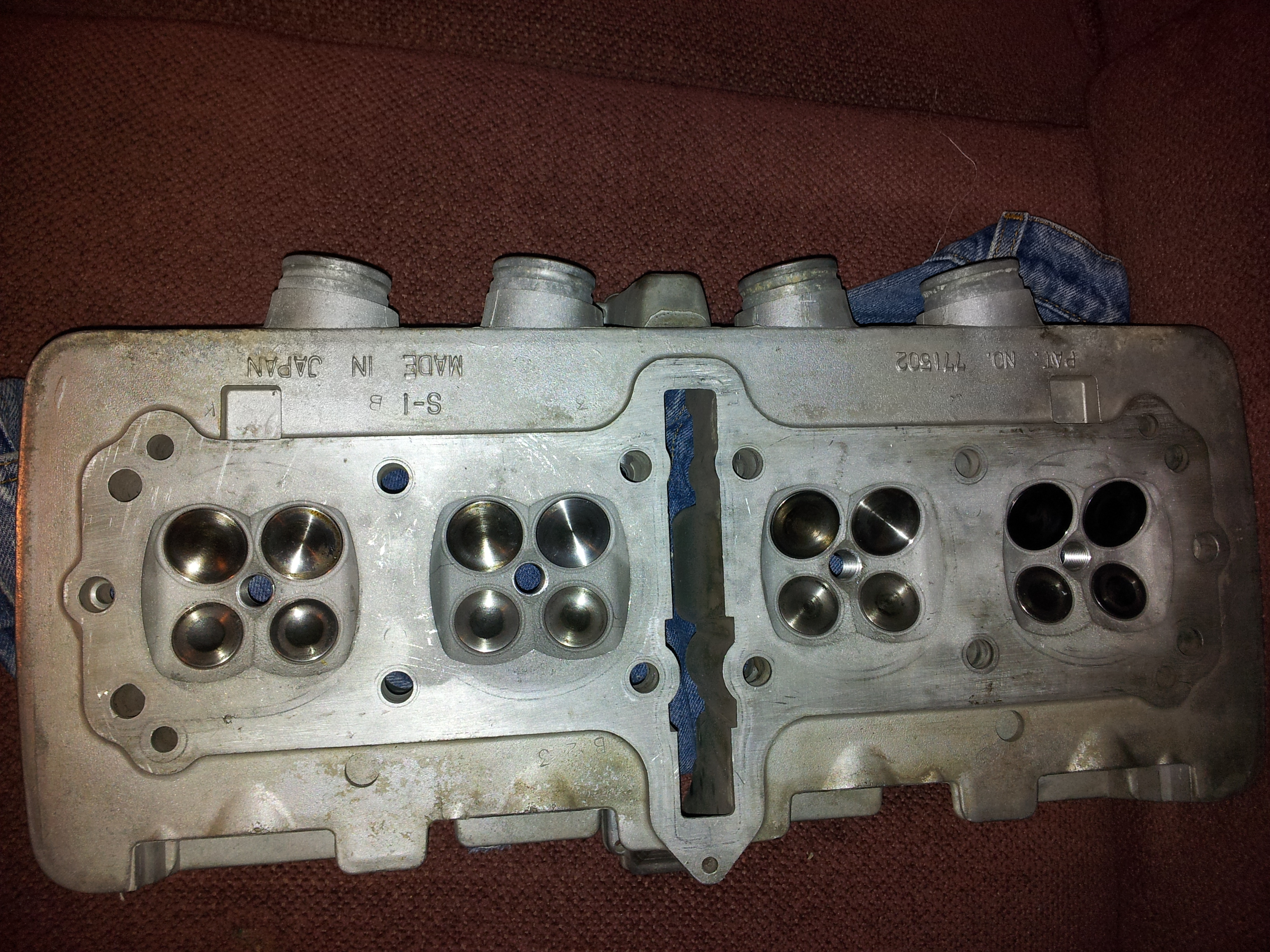
Four-valve head, from a Suzuki GSX1100, showing the exhaust valves (bottom row) and inlet valves (upper row) with the port stubs from the carburettors just visible above the head

This term is used for engines which have two intake and two exhaust valves per cylinder; four (or five) valves per cylinder result in engines having superior high RPM performance sourced from total port circumference, rather than the relative location of the ports.

== See also ==
- T-head engine, a crossflow side-valve engine.
- Lancia ECV had the Triflux engine, a unique crossed-valve engine, in which each side of the inline-four cylinder engine had both an intake valve and an exhaust valve, allowing intake and exhaust glasses to enter and exit from both sides of the engine at the same time.
