= Suzuki GSX1400 =

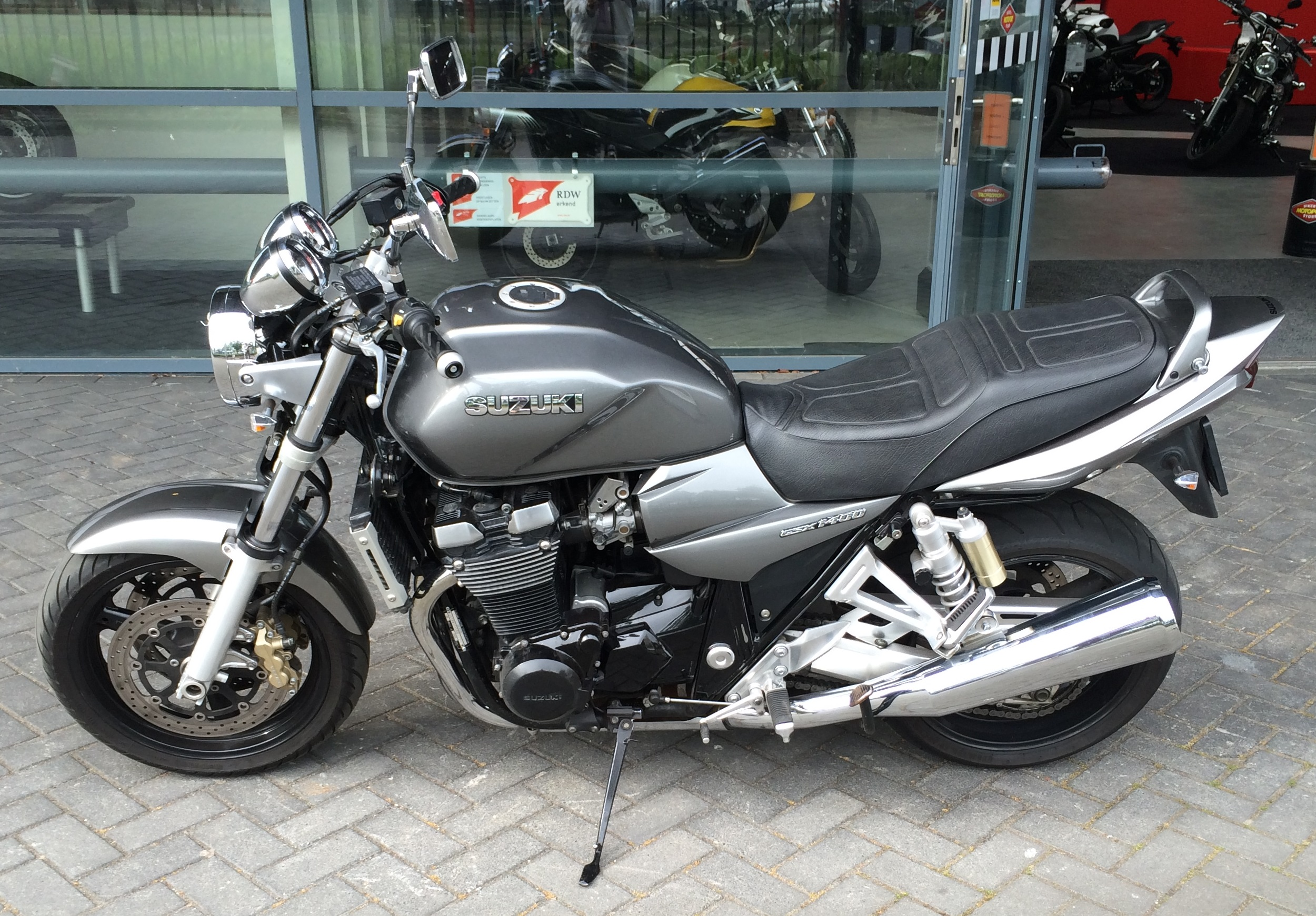
- Manufacturer: Suzuki
- Production: 2001–2008
- Class: Standard
- Engine: Air/oil cooled 1,402 cc (85.6 cu in) DOHC 16 valve inline four
- Bore / stroke: 81 x 68 mm
- Top speed: 150 mph (240 km/h)
- Power: 106 bhp (79 kW)
- Transmission: Six speed, chain drive
- Frame type: Steel tube, double cradle.
- Suspension: Front: fully adjustable 46 mm fork Rear: aluminum swingarm.
- Brakes: Front: 2 X 320 mm (13 in) discs w/6 piston Tokico calipers
- Tires: Front: 120/70-17; Rear: 190/50-17
- Weight: 228 kg (503 lb) (dry)

The Suzuki GSX1400 is a muscle bike manufactured between 2001–2008 by Suzuki. Intended to be a faster and more torque-laden version than Suzuki's similar Bandit 1200, with more up to date technology, the GSX1400 was still characterized as a "disco-era".

Initially the bike was only produced for Japan and Europe, opening to the Australian market in 2001; although there was a movement to try to make the GSX1400 available in the US and Canada.

The GSX1400 is redlined at 9,000 rpm; however in practice there is little point in taking it past 7,000 because the bike has strong low and mid-range performance. The fuel injection throttle bodies are also fairly small bore and ultimately limit the breathing (and therefore power) of the engine at high revs, this does again however enhance low-end torque and response. Conversions including turbocharging and supercharging can be implemented to get around these breathing limitations and deliver significant increases in power and torque.

UK market models changed in detail over the years, on later models including a wheel colour change from white to black, to swap from a 4 into 2 exhaust system to a 4 into 1 system, and Yoshimura branded exhaust silencers - although this was available as a dealer fit option.

The last model, virtually unchanged except for colour schemes, was sold in 2008.
