= Reverse-flow cylinder head =

Type of cylinder head

In engine technology, a reverse-flow or non-crossflow cylinder head is one that locates the intake and exhaust ports on the same side of the engine. The gases can be thought to enter the cylinder head and then change direction to exit the head. This is in contrast to the crossflow cylinder head design.

== Advantages ==
The main advantage of the reverse-flow cylinder head is that both the entering inlet charge and the exiting exhaust gas cause a tendency to swirl in the same direction in the combustion chamber. In a crossflow head the inlet and exhaust gases promote swirl in opposite directions so that during overlap the swirl changes directions. The constant swirl during overlap which results in a reverse-flow cylinder head promotes better mixing, hence better scavenging of the end gas. The fact that the inlet charge must change direction before exiting the exhaust makes it less likely that fresh mixture will exit the exhaust before mixing during overlap. Overall this improves volumetric efficiency and reduces emissions.

In carbureted engines, poorly atomized fuel reduces efficiency and power at lower rpm (at higher rpm the higher air speed keeps the mixture in suspension). The inlet manifold of a reverse-flow cylinder head may be connected to the exhaust by a heat riser to transfer further heat, improving low rpm response and emissions as a result.

Costs can be reduced in production engines by casting the inlet and exhaust manifolds as one unit. This also transfers further heat to the inlet eliminating the need for manifold heating and other related devices. Such an engine is overall simpler, and has improved cold starting.

== Disadvantages ==
The reverse flow design is generally considered to be inferior to a crossflow design in terms of ultimate engineering potential for two reasons. Firstly, there is limited space when inlet and exhaust ports are arranged in a line on one side of the head meaning a reduction in port area compared to a crossflow head. This mainly affects power delivery at high rpm by limiting airflow. Secondly, since inlet and exhaust manifolds are both on the same side of the engine and in close proximity, the inlet manifold and carburetor (if applicable) are heated by the exhaust. This heating reduces the density of the inlet charge and hence the volumetric efficiency of the engine. In a spark-ignition petrol engine the heat also increases the likelihood of pre-ignition or detonation which limits the allowable compression ratio reducing both power and efficiency.

== Solutions ==
Engineering has found a number of solutions to the first problem such as staggering the ports by placing the inlet ports on a higher level than the exhausts. This way larger ports can be used while still leaving enough room for flanges and fasteners. This brings with it the problem that the exhaust ports have a tighter turn radius. This problem is somewhat offset by the larger port. Another popular solution, as used in the BMC A-Series and Holden 6-cylinder engines is the siamesed port. In this configuration one large port feeds 2 adjacent cylinders. The gain in area comes from effectively removing the material between 2 adjacent ports. This solution encourages charge robbing, where one cylinder "robs" the charge from the port leaving the next one with less mixture. This happens because the 2 cylinders which share the port are not equally spaced in terms of firing order. For example, the Leyland Mini with its 1-3-4-2 firing order has the 1 and 2 inlets siamesed and the 3 and 4 inlets siamesed. First the number 3 sucks the mixture out of the port, then there is less left for number 4. While number 1 and 2 are sucking the port again fills with mixture and the process repeats leaving the number 1 and 4 cylinders always lacking mixture. Also the siamese port can make both acoustic and inertial ram air tuning less effective due to the irregular pulse. One should keep in mind that larger ports are only necessary at higher rpm and that small ports are desirable at low rpm to improve air speed. Due to charge robbing and lower air speeds, large siamesed ports are more suited to high rpm race motors.

The heat problem can be minimized by staggering the ports in terms of height and using heat proof wraps and coatings on the exhaust header to the point that it poses a negligible problem. The heat can also be used as an advantage.

== Forced induction ==
When forced induction is used, large port flow is not as important as it is when an engine is naturally aspirated. This means that the generally inferior flow of a reverse-flow head is less of a disadvantage. In the early days of turbo charging a reverse-flow head allowed the compressor outlet of a turbocharger to blow directly into the inlet manifold with either a blow-through or draw-through carburettor and no intercooler. This allowed the use of shorter inlet plumbing which decreased turbo lag and lowered flow restriction. Modern turbocharged configurations utilizing intercoolers and fuel injection are more difficult to plumb up to a reverse-flow head and are ideally suited to a cross flow head where the turbo is on the exhaust side of the engine, the charge crosses through an intercooler in front of the engine and into the inlet manifold on the other side.

== Summary of uses ==
The reverse flow head was ideally suited to a production carbureted engine due to its low rpm performance and ease of manufacture. The design could be modified for high performance by porting (in particular siamese) and isolating the inlet manifold from the exhaust header. The configuration is also perfect for carbureted non-intercooled turbo-charging. However, the advent of fuel injection and electronic ignition has made most of the reverse-flow head's advantages redundant in a modern engine and as a result the design has lost its popularity. The reverse-flow head still enjoys some popularity among enthusiasts including Leyland Mini, Chrysler Slant-6, Holden and Ford Inline 6 fans. In fact some Australian Ford enthusiasts consider the 250 2V reverse-flow head to be superior to the Honda designed cross-flow head that replaced it.
