= Suzuki GSX1100F =

Suzuki GSX-1100F
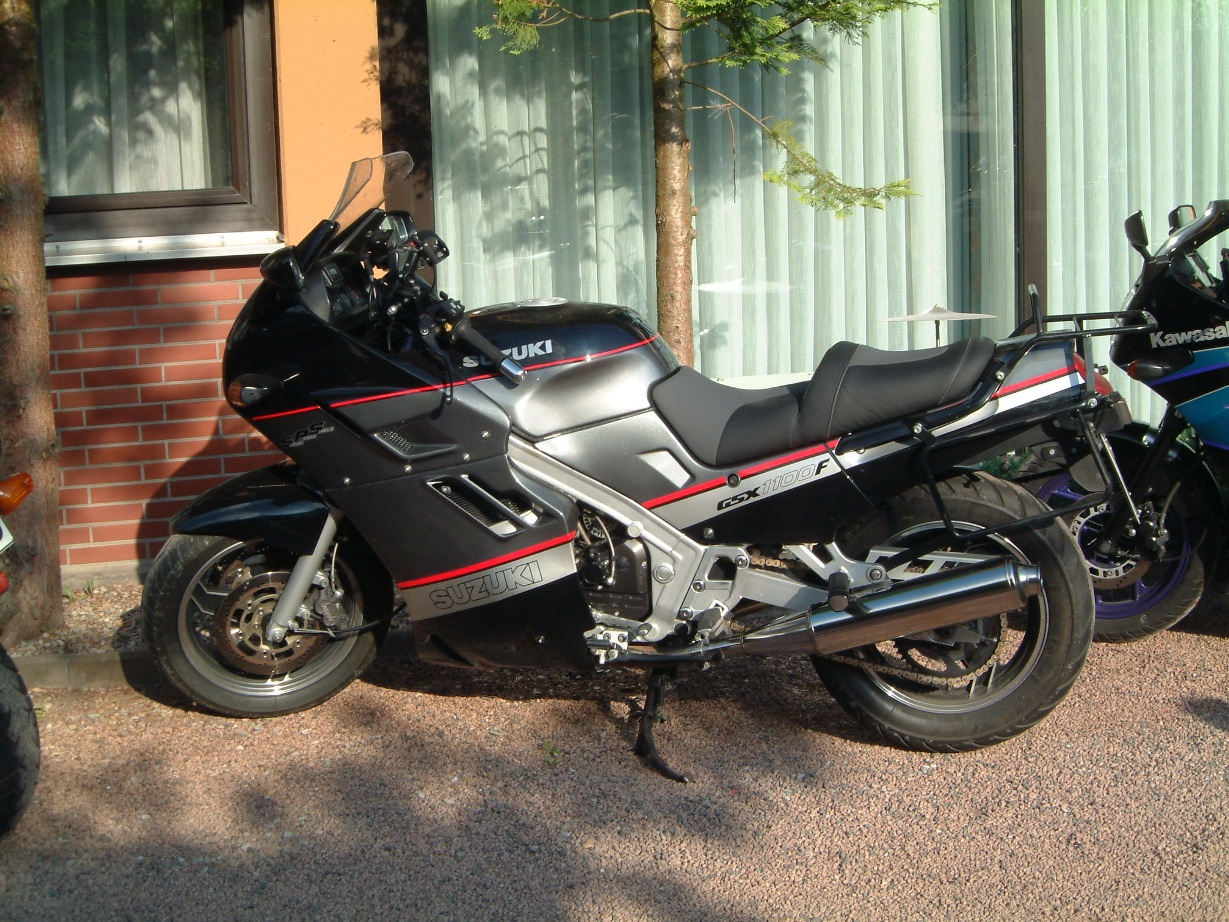
- Manufacturer: Suzuki
- Class: Sport tourer
- Engine: Air/oil cooled, four stroke, transverse four cylinder, DOHC, 4 valves/cyl.
- Transmission: 5 speed, chain
- Brakes: Front-2x 275mm discs 2 piston calipers. Rear- Single 275mm disc 2 piston caliper
- Fuel capacity: 21 L (4.6 imp gal; 5.5 US gal)
- Related: Suzuki GSX-R1100

The Suzuki GSX1100F is a sport touring motorcycle introduced by Suzuki in October 1987 as part of the GSX series. It had a 16-valve engine and a 5-speed gearbox.

It had a full touring fairing and was particularly noted for its electrically powered height-adjustable wind screen that was prone to failures. The engine came originally from the GSX-R1100, but was re-tuned to provide more low-end and mid-range power.

Panniers by the German company Krauser were fitted as an option from new to some bikes. The panniers had the Suzuki logo on them and were the K2 version at the time.

The digital clock on the dashboard was powered separately by a clock battery and not the bike's main battery.

After market exhaust systems available could be fitted to replace the factory fitted versions. The factory version was a twin system where 2 cylinders exhausted to one side and 2 cylinders to the other side of the bike with two silencers, one on one side and one on the other. Some after market exhaust systems required removal of the factory center stand.

The dash consists of the fuel gauge, rev counter and speedometer. Warning lights are signal left, signal right, neutral, oil pressure and main beam.

Seat height of 795mm and the shape of the seat means a rider who is 166 cm tall can comfortably sit on the bike and feel stable in slow traffic.

Depending on target market the bike carried the name "Katana".
