= Suzuki GSX650F =

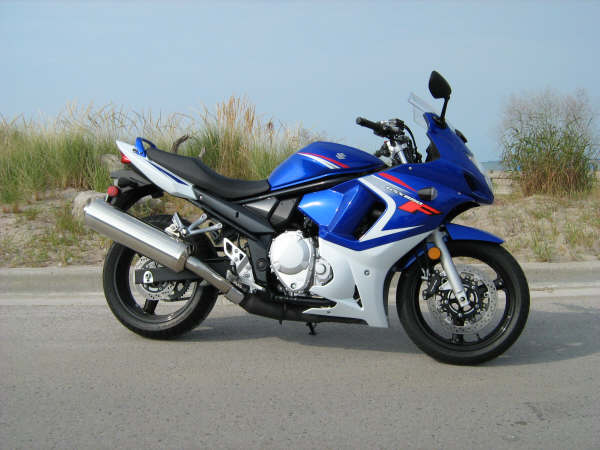
- Manufacturer: Suzuki
- Production: 2007-2015
- Predecessor: Suzuki Katana
- Class: Sport touring
- Engine: 656 cc (40.0 cu in) liquid-cooled, 4-stroke, inline-four, 16-valve, DOHC
- Bore / stroke: 65.5 mm × 48.7 mm (2.58 in × 1.92 in)
- Compression ratio: 11.5:1
- Power: 85 bhp (63 kW)
- Torque: 45.6 lb⋅ft (61.8 N⋅m)
- Ignition type: Electronic
- Transmission: 6 speed constant mesh
- Frame type: Duplex steel tube cradle
- Suspension: Front: Telescopic, coil spring, oil damped Rear: Link type, coil spring, oil damped
- Brakes: Front: Twin Ø 310 mm (12 in) discs Rear: Single Ø 240 mm (9.4 in) disc
- Tires: Front: 120/70 ZR17 M/C; Rear: 160/60 ZR17 M/C
- Rake, trail: 26°, 108 mm (4.3 in)
- Wheelbase: 1,470 mm (58 in)
- Dimensions: L: 2,130 mm (84 in); W: 760 mm (30 in); H: 1,225 mm (48.2 in)
- Seat height: 770 mm (30 in)
- Fuel capacity: 19 L (4.2 imp gal; 5.0 US gal)
- Oil capacity: 3,000 mL (3.2 US qt)
- Turning radius: 3 m (9.8 ft)
- Related: Suzuki GSF650 Bandit

The Suzuki GSX650F is a sport touring motorcycle made by Suzuki. It is essentially an updated Bandit, filling the void of the retired Katana. The 656 cc liquid-cooled engine has 85 bhp (63 kW) and a 12,500 rpm redline. The transmission is 6-speed with a chain drive. Anti-lock brakes were added as standard equipment in 2009 for Canada.

Since its introduction there have been two recalls for the US 2008 model for electrical issues that cause stalling while riding and improper battery charging .

== Australasian LAMS variant ==
In Australia and New Zealand, the Suzuki GSX650 is available in an "FU" and "F" silver engine models to comply with the LAMS (Learner Approved Motorcycle Scheme) requirements. This is achieved by shipping a modified ECM (Engine Control Module) that has most of the upper band of available engine revs mapped to lower power output.

The model typically is identifiable by the graphic on the fairings blending less abruptly than the F counterpart, i.e.; the blue and white default colour scheme are feathered together to give seamlessness whereas the F model fairings are deliberately sharp lines achieving a sportier look.
