= Suzuki Bandit series =

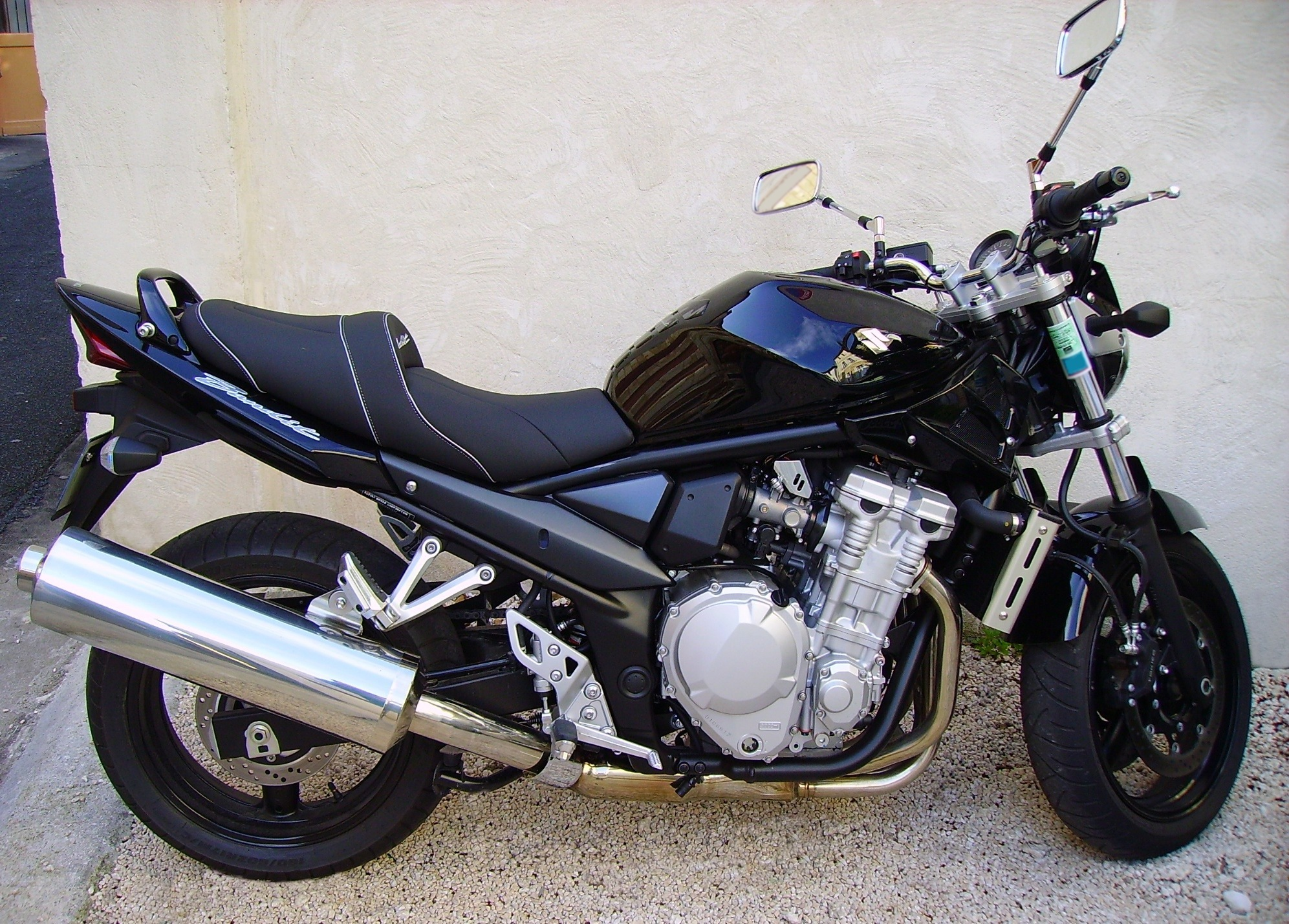
- 2009 Suzuki Bandit GSF650N
- Manufacturer: Suzuki
- Production: 1989–present
- Predecessor: Suzuki GS series
- Class: Standard
- Engine: 248–1,255 cc (15.1–76.6 cu in) SACS/liquid-cooled 4-stroke 16-valve DOHC inline-four; 147.3 cc (8.99 cu in) liquid-cooled 4-stroke 4-valve DOHC single cylinder (GSX150)

The Suzuki Bandit is a series of standard motorcycles produced by Suzuki since 1989.

With the exception of GSX150, which is powered by a DOHC single cylinder engine, all Bandit models have DOHC inline-four engines with 4 valves per cylinder. The GSF600 engine is based on the GSX600F engine, retuned for more mid-range torque. The GSF1200 engine is a bored out version of the GSX-R1100 engine, also retuned for more mid-range torque. The GSF650 and GSF1250 models use fuel-injected, liquid-cooled engines, the GSF1250 having an auxiliary balance shaft to reduce vibrations.

'S' versions have a half-fairing, and starting from model year 2000, they also have dual headlights. 'N' versions are unfaired naked bikes with a single headlight. The availability of the 'S' and 'N' versions varies with country and model year.

The Bandit series earned a reputation as "hooligan bikes". With more recent revisions, however, the bike has taken on a more streamlined and modern feel, taking it more towards sports tourer territory. The GSF1200 remains popular with stunt riders, and is used by a wheelie school in the UK.

== Bandit models ==
- GSX150, 147 cc liquid-cooled (2018–present)
- GSF250, 248 cc liquid-cooled (1989–2000)
- GSF400, 398 cc liquid-cooled (1989–1997)
- GSF600, 599 cc SACS (1995–2004)
- GSF650, 656 cc SACS (2005–2006), liquid-cooled (2007–2016)
- GSF750, 748 cc SACS (1996–1999)
- GSF1200, 1,157 cc SACS (1996–2007)
- GSF1250, 1,255 cc liquid-cooled (2007–2016)

== GSF250 and GSF400 ==
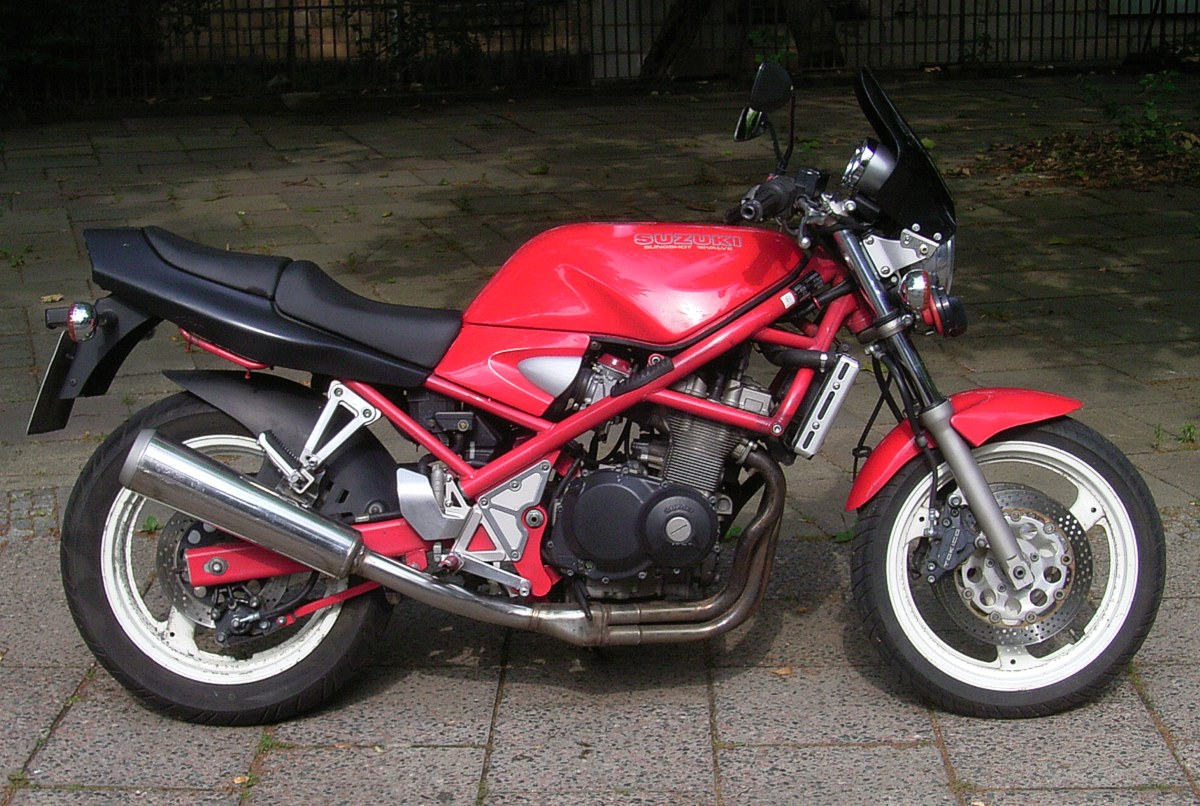
1991 Suzuki GSF400

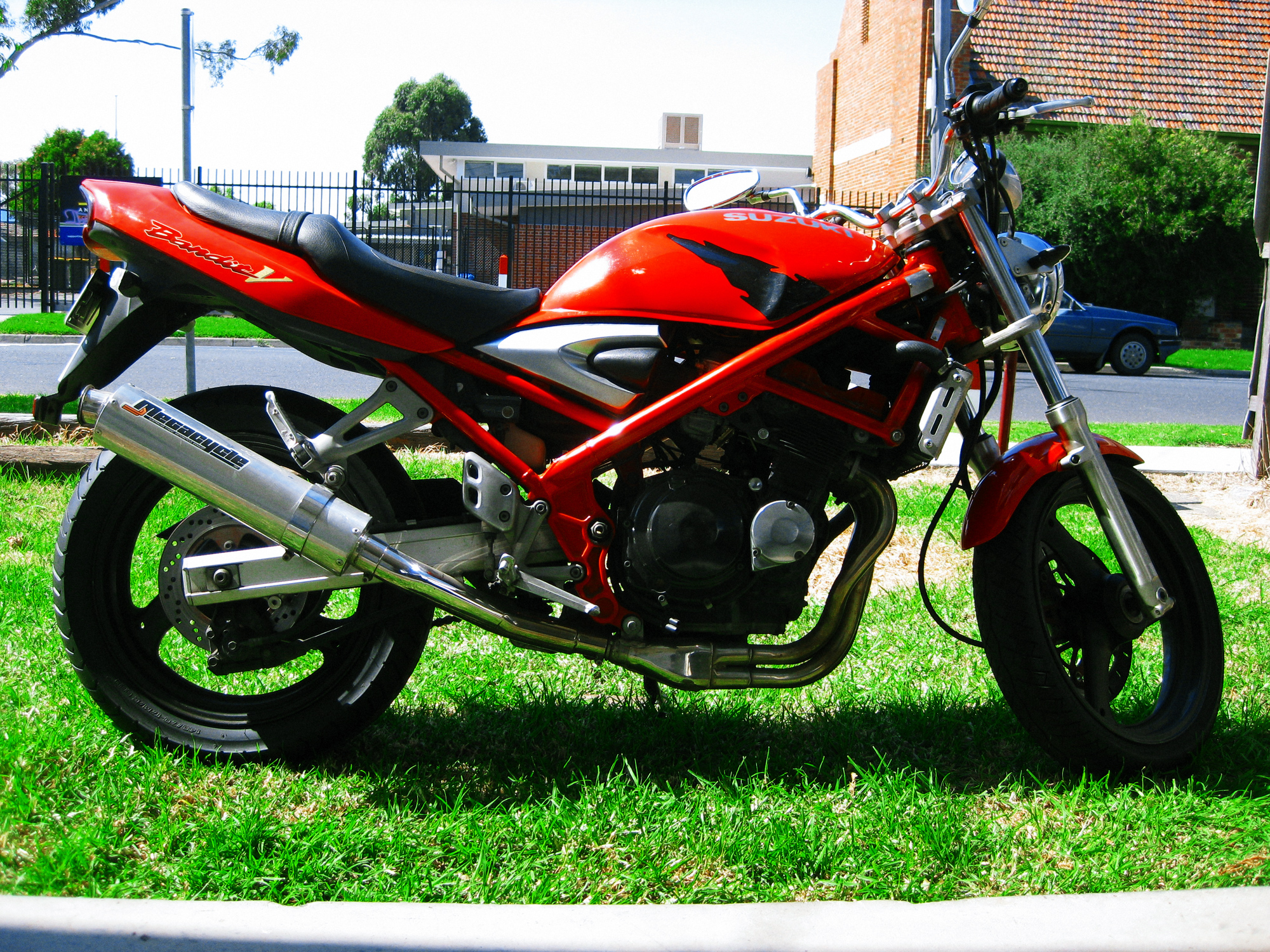
1995 Suzuki GSF250V with modified exhaust

Launched in 1989, the GSF250 and GSF400 are naked street motorcycles, with liquid-cooled, inline four cylinder engines derived from the GSX-R250 and GSX-R400 motorcycles, mounted as a stressed member in a steel trellis frame with single rear shock absorber. Apart from the engines and transmission, the "baby Bandits" share many of their parts. Limited editions have a retro-styled top fairing. 'N' designated models have clip-on handlebars. "GSF" and "Bandit" nomenclature are both used across the series' chronology and market geography.

The first generation GSF250 (GJ74A) produces 45 bhp (34 kW), while the GSF400 (GK75A) produces 59 bhp (44 kW). The GSF400 manages the extra power with a 525 chain and double disk front brakes (single disk in North America), compared to a 520 chain and single front disk on the GSF250.

From 1991, the GSF400V received variable inlet timing via solenoid-controlled rocker arm engaging with supplementary cams. Although these models are commonly referred to as "GSF400V-V", the '-V' actually denotes the 1997 Suzuki model year motorcycles. VVT models are usually recognised by a red engine cover and some instances of a light grey engine cover. The GSF250V arrived later, in 1995.

In 1992, engine adjustments improved low-mid range torque trading off peak power reduced to 53 bhp (40 kW) for the GSF400 and 40 bhp (30 kW) for the GSF250.

In 1995, the second generation GSF250V (GJ77A) and GSF400(V) (GK7AA) introduced significant updates, including new styling, fuel tank, swingarm, air filter assembly, exhaust, seat, controls, console, etc.

GSF250 models

- GSF250 - model years 'K' (1989), 'L' (1990), 'M' (1991), 'N' (1992), 'P' (1993), 'R' (1994).
- GSF250V - model years 'S' (1995), 'Y' (2000).
- GSF250Z - limited, model years 'M' (1991), 'N' (1992), 'P' (1993).
- GSF250VZ - limited, model year 'S' (1995).

GSF400 models

- GSF400 - model years 'K' (1989), 'L' (1990), 'M' (1991), 'N' (1992), 'P' (1993), 'R' (1994), 'S' (1995).
- GSF400V - VC engine, model years 'M' (1991), 'N' (1992), 'P' (1993), 'R' (1994), 'S' (1995), 'V' (1997).
- GSF400Z - limited, model years 'L' (1990, SUZUKI 70th Anniversary "LIMITED" edition), 'M' (1991).
- GSF400VZ - VC engine, limited, model years 'M' (1991), 'N' (1992), 'P' (1993), 'V' (1997).

=== Specifications ===
Model	GSF250 (GJ74A)	GSF250V (GJ77A)	GSF400(V) (GK75A)	GSF400(V) (GK7AA)
Engine	Four-stroke inline-4, DOHC, 16 valves, liquid-cooled			
Displacement	248 cc (15.1 cu in)		398 cc (24.3 cu in)	
Bore × stroke	49.0 mm × 33.0 mm (1.93 in × 1.30 in)		56.0 mm × 40.4 mm (2.20 in × 1.59 in)	
Maximum power	45 PS (33 kW) @ 14,500 rpm (Dec 1989 – Aug 1992); 40 PS (29 kW) @ 13,500 rpm (Sep 1992 – 1994)	40 PS (29 kW) (1995 – 2000)	59 PS (43 kW) (–1991); 53 PS (39 kW) (1992–)	
Maximum torque	25.5 N⋅m (18.8 lbf⋅ft) @ 10,500 rpm (Dec 1989 – Aug 1992); 26.5 N⋅m (19.5 lbf⋅ft) @ 10,000 rpm (Sep 1992 – 1994)			
Compression ratio	12.5:1		11.8:1	
Fuel delivery	Mikuni BDST30 x4	Mikuni BST29 ×4	Mikuni BST32SS/BST33SS ×4	
Ignition	TCI; 1–2–4–3			
Transmission	6-speed, sequential, constant mesh			
Clutch	Wet, multi-plate			
Final drive	520 Pitch 116 Link O-ring chain		525 o-ring chain	
Frame	Tubular steel trellis; engine as stressed member.			
Rake	26°	26.5°		
Trail	101 mm (4.0 in)	103 mm (4.1 in)	100 mm (3.9 in)	103 mm (4.1 in)
Turning radius	3.2 m (10 ft)	2.7 m (8 ft 10 in)	3.2 m (10 ft)	2.7 m (8 ft 10 in)
Front suspension	41 mm telescopic, coil spring, oil damped.			
Rear suspension	Link type single coil spring, gas/oil damped, 7-step adjustable pre-load.			
Front suspension stroke	120 mm (4.7 in)	130 mm (5.1 in)	120 mm (4.7 in)	130 mm (5.1 in)
Rear suspension stroke	131 mm (5.2 in)	128 mm (5.0 in)	120 mm (4.7 in)	128 mm (5.0 in)
Front wheel	17M/C × MT3.00			
Rear wheel	17M/C × MT4.00			
Front tire	110/70–17M/C 54H	110/70R–17M/C 54H	110/70–17M/C 54H	110/70R–17M/C 54H
Rear tire	140/70–17M/C 66H	150/60R–17M/C 66H	150/70–17M/C 69H	150/60R–17M/C 66H
Front brake	Single 310 mm floating disc, Tokico 2-piston caliper	Single floating disc, Tokico 2-piston caliper	Double floating disc, Tokico 4-piston calipers; Single disc (N. America, Italy)	Double floating disc, Tokico 4-piston calipers
Rear brake	Single 250 mm disc, Tokico 2-piston caliper	Single disc, Tokico 2-piston caliper		
Wheelbase	1,435 mm (56.5 in)	1,415 mm (55.7 in)	1,430 mm (56 in)	1,410 mm (56 in)
Overall length	2,050 mm (81 in)	2,050 mm (81 in)	2,130 mm (84 in); 2,090 mm (82 in)	2,050 mm (81 in)
Overall width	700–745 mm (27.6–29.3 in)	730 mm (29 in)	700–745 mm (27.6–29.3 in)	730 mm (29 in)
Overall height	1,060–1,155 mm (41.7–45.5 in)	1,055 mm (41.5 in)	1,060–1,155 mm (41.7–45.5 in)	1,055 mm (41.5 in)
Seat height	750 mm (30 in)		790 mm (31 in)	
Ground clearance	155 mm (6.1 in)	140 mm (5.5 in)	155 mm (6.1 in)	140 mm (5.5 in)
Fuel tank capacity	Total 14 L (3.1 imp gal; 3.7 US gal) / Reserve 3.5 L (0.77 imp gal; 0.92 US gal)	15 L (3.3 imp gal; 4.0 US gal)	14.5 L (3.2 imp gal; 3.8 US gal); 16 L (3.5 imp gal; 4.2 US gal)	15 L (3.3 imp gal; 4.0 US gal)
Engine oil / with filter change	2.7 L (0.59 imp gal; 0.71 US gal) / 3.0 L (0.66 imp gal; 0.79 US gal)		2.3 L (0.51 imp gal; 0.61 US gal) / 2.8 L (0.62 imp gal; 0.74 US gal)	
Coolant	Engine 1.7 L (0.37 imp gal; 0.45 US gal) / Tank 200 mL (7.0 imp fl oz; 6.8 US fl oz)	1.9 L (0.42 imp gal; 0.50 US gal)	1.9 L (0.42 imp gal; 0.50 US gal)	2.17 L (0.48 imp gal; 0.57 US gal)
Dry weight	156 kg (344 lb)	146 kg (322 lb)	168 kg (370 lb)	167 kg (368 lb)
Wet weight	176 kg (388 lb)	169 kg (373 lb)	189 kg (417 lb)	188 kg (414 lb)

== GSF600 ==
1995

The naked GSF600 N Bandit was released in February. It was based on the styling of the pre-existing GSF400 Bandit, with a retuned engine from the GSX600. The 600 Bandits came with a 15 tooth front sprocket and 48 tooth rear sprocket connected by a 530V 110 link chain.

1996

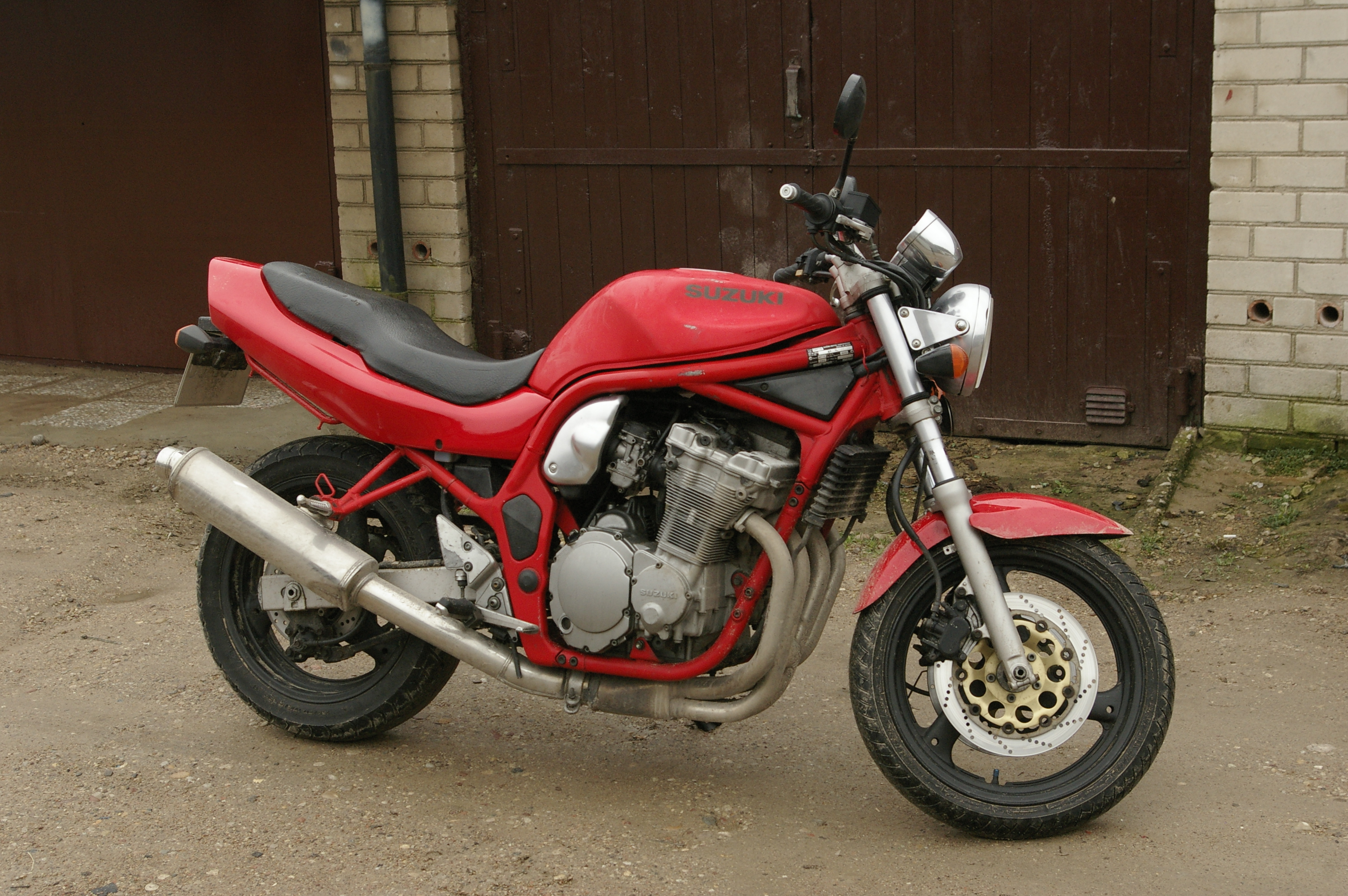
1996 Suzuki Bandit GSF600

The faired Bandit S model was introduced, where the bikini half-fairing had its debut.

1997

Minor changes: A clutch switch (requiring the clutch to be pulled in when starting the motorcycle, for safety reasons) and carburettor heaters.

1998

The N model had passenger grab rails added. However, the S model had no changes.

1999

Debut of a new rear shock absorber, providing rebound as well as preload adjustment.

2000

The first major changes were made this year.

- New rear bodywork.
- Fully electronic instrumentation.
- New carburettors with throttle position sensor.
- Additional fuel filter.
- Nissin brake callipers.
- 20 litres (4.4 imp gal; 5.3 US gal) fuel tank (up from 19).
- Improvements to frame and steering geometry.
- Seat height lowered.
- S model: New modern styled half fairing, with twin headlights.

2002

Fuel gauge now as standard.

== GSF650 ==
2005

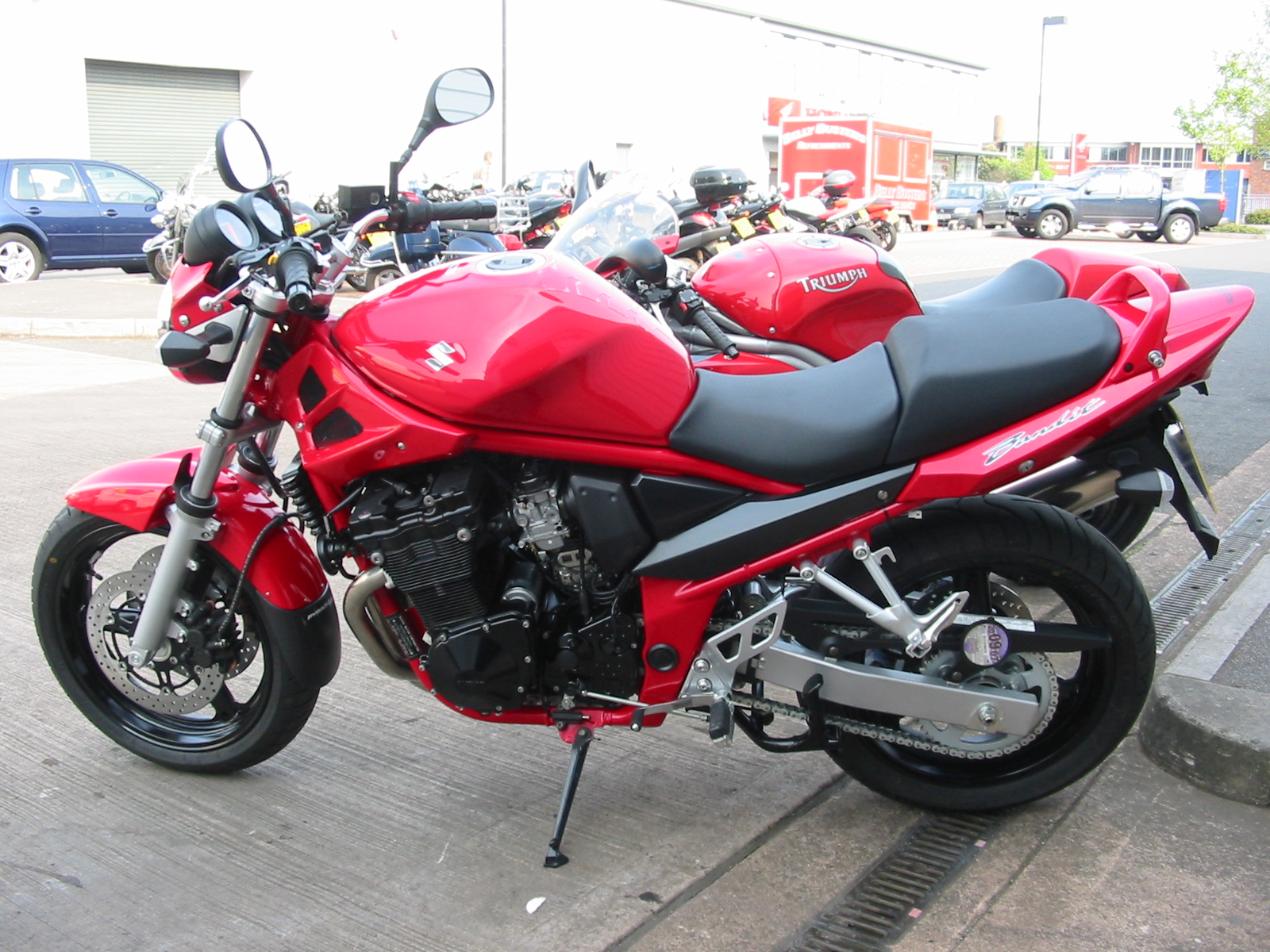
The last of the air/oil-cooled Suzuki Bandit 650

The Bandit 650 and half-faired Bandit 650S launch took place at Tarragona, Spain.

- Engine displacement increased by 56 cc to improve low- and mid-range performance
- Seat and handlebars adjustable for height (seat: 770 mm/30.3 in or 790 mm/31.1 in)
- New engine internals provide for reduced friction, together with smoother performance and increased power
- Revised four-into-two exhaust system
- Reshaped fuel tank
- New halogen headlight
- New LCD digital display combining speedometer, odometer, tripmeter, fuel gauge and clock
- Increased rigidity within chassis and upgraded suspension
- Overall weight reduced
- ABS available as an option
- Speedometer/odometer switchable between Metric and Imperial
- Suzuki PAIR (Pulsed AIR) exhaust air injection system

2007

Current generation Bandit 650S

Suzuki designed a new, water-cooled engine specifically for the 2007 Bandit 650, unlike earlier models where they used re-worked engines from other models. Most of the chassis and bodywork remained unchanged from the 2005 model, though.

- Meets Euro3 emission standards
- 656 cc displacement, inline-four all-aluminium liquid-cooled engine
- Electronic Fuel Injection with dual throttle valve system (similar to Suzuki's GSX-R and V-Strom)
- 10% stiffer frame and longer swingarm
- Stiffer rear shock but softer front fork
- Claimed 85 hp (63 kW) at 10,500 rpm (up 7 hp)
- 12,500 rpm redline
- Same 20 litres (4.4 imp gal; 5.3 US gal) fuel tank as previous model, but the fuel pump takes about 1 L
- Hydraulic clutch
- 14 kg heavier

The 2007 Bandit 650 was reviewed by Bike magazine as being "de-criminalised" compared to its early brethren, but a good bike for beginners.

No longer available in the US.

2008

No longer available in Canada. Replaced by new Bandit-derived fully faired GSX650F in North America.

2009

In November 2008, Suzuki announced the following changes for the 2009 GSF650N and GSX650S.

- Sleeker headlights
- Slightly different frame covers
- Slimmer tail lights
- Re-shaped exhaust ends
- Single instrument housing with analogue tachometer, digital LCD speedo, fuel gauge, clock, and gear indicator

Suzuki also announced the following changes.

- GSF650N only: more angular headlights.
- GSF650S only: re-styled cowling with stacked high and low beam multi-reflector headlights, storage in fairing, and new mirrors and indicators.

=== GSX650F ===
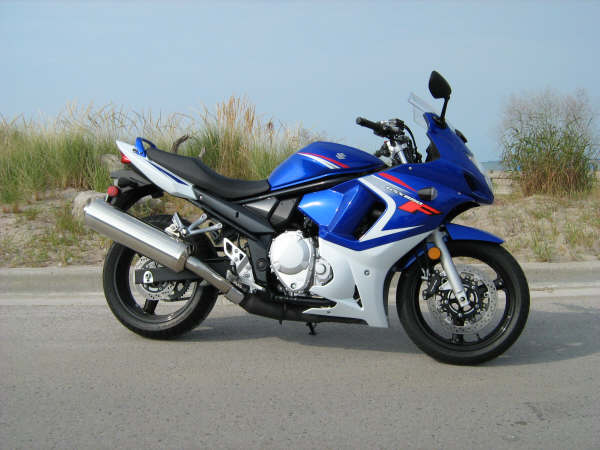
The Suzuki GSX650F, in many respects a tweaked Bandit

The GSX650F, produced from 2008, is essentially a variation on the Bandit 650, with much the same specification and components. Although built on a Bandit chassis, the additional lower fairing gives it a sportier look similar to that of the GSX-R series. The engine has also had a small amount of remapping to encourage revs, and the suspension is tweaked. It also has a different, one-piece seat.

== GSF750 ==
The Bandit 750 was a Japan only model that used parts from both the 600 and 1200 models; the front frame cradle was identical to the 600, the rear subframe was identical to the 1200 with bolt on pillion footpeg hangers, the clocks were 1200 items with a higher red-line on the rev counter of 12,000rpm (vs 10,000 for the 1200), including a fuel gauge which was absent from the 600 models of the time. The running gear and suspension were also the same as the 600. The engine, although visually identical to the 600, had a capacity of 748 cc, The carburettors were similar to the 600 apart from jetting, whereas the exhaust was identical to the 1200. The 750 came with a 6 speed gearbox like the 600 - as opposed to the 5 speed on the 1200. Power was a claimed 85 bhp (63 kW). All machines were restricted to 180 km/h (110 mph) to comply with Japanese regulations, but are easily de-restricted to a true maximum speed of 220 km/h (140 mph).

== GSF1200 ==
GSF1200
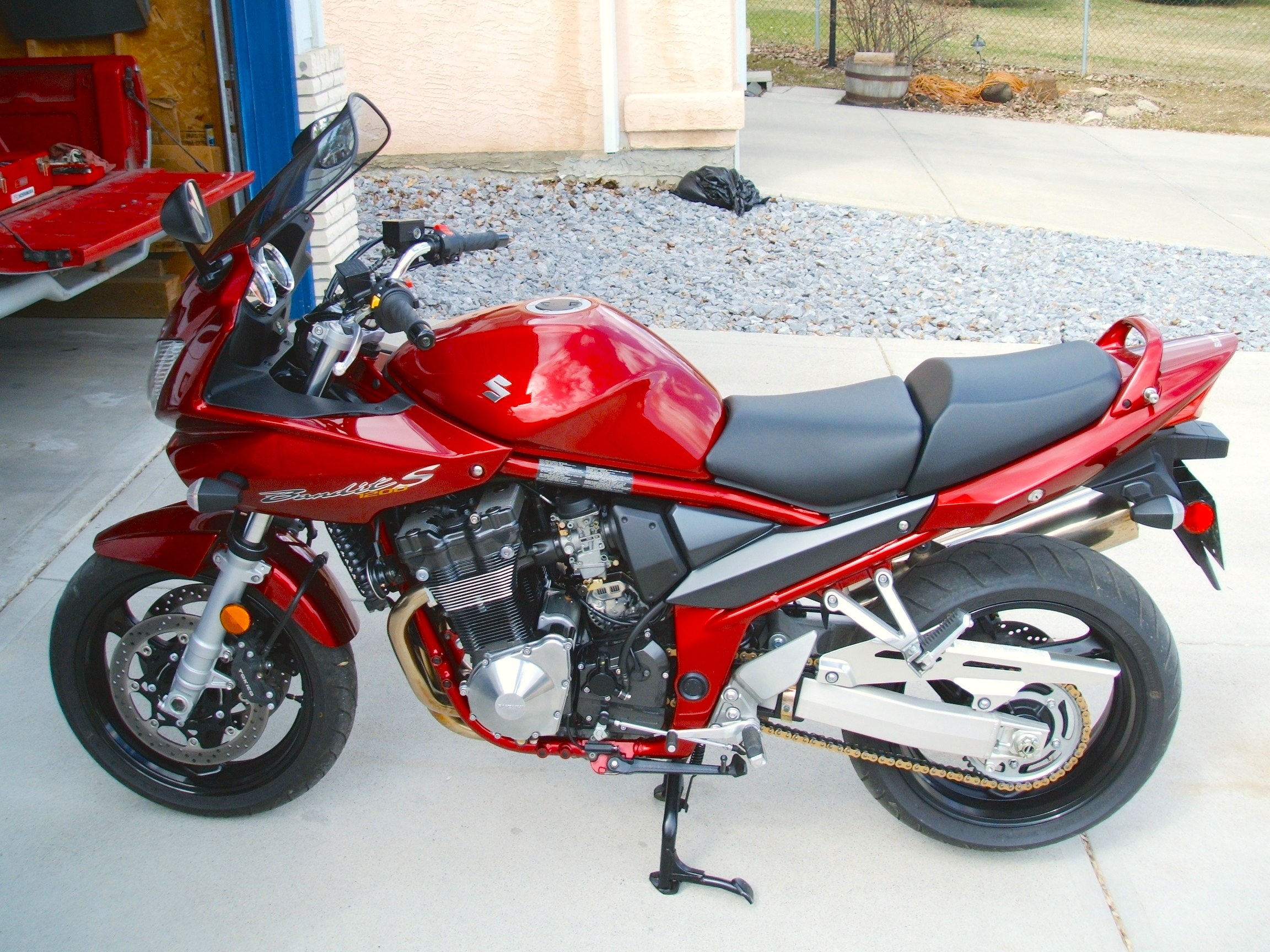
- 2006 non-ABS GSF1200S with aftermarket screen
- Production: 1996–2007
- Successor: GSF1250
- Engine: 1,157 cc (70.6 cu in) SACS 4-stroke 16-valve DOHC inline-four
- Transmission: 5-speed constant mesh
- Frame type: Steel tubular
- Suspension: Front: 43 mm (1.7 in) telescopic fork, adjustable spring preload; Rear: Aluminum-alloy swingarm, link type, adjustable rebound/preload
- Brakes: Front: 4-piston caliper with double 310 mm (12.2 in) discs; Rear: Single-piston caliper with single disc
- Wheelbase: 1,480 mm (58.3 in)
- Dimensions: L: 2,130 mm (83.9 in); W: 790 mm (31.1 in); H: 1,235 mm (48.6 in)
- Seat height: 785–805 mm (30.9–31.7 in) (adjustable)
- Weight: 215 kg (474 lb) (dry)
- Fuel capacity: 20 L (4.4 imp gal; 5.3 US gal)

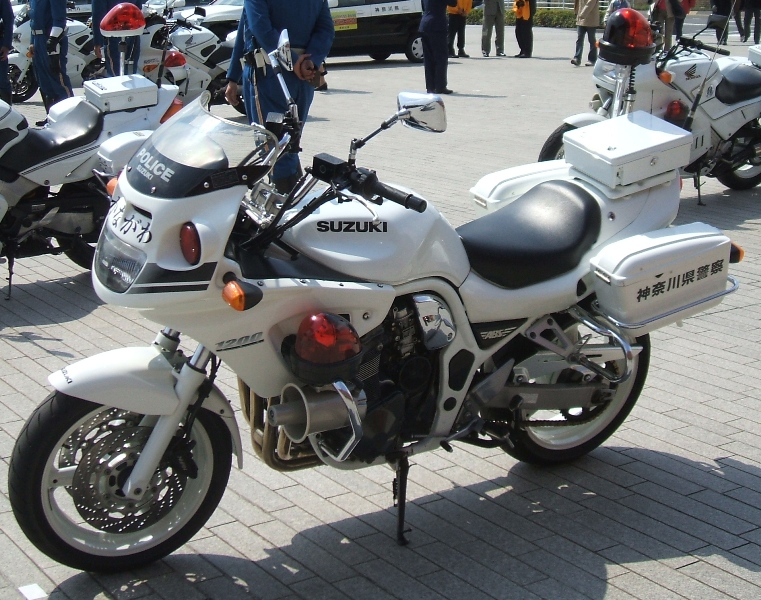
Suzuki GSF1200P (police version)

1996

The Bandit 1200 was generally released in January 1996, but a few were registered in 1995. It is powered by a re-tuned and higher capacity version of the GSX-R1100 engine. Other differences from the 600 cc models include fuel gauge, higher specification suspension, hydraulically operated clutch, larger diameter front brake discs, and 5-speed gearbox as opposed to the 6-speed gearbox of the 600 Bandit.

Many Suzuki motorcycles have the engine size cast into side of the cylinder block; 1200 Bandits (1,157 cc) do not have this but, apparently, some early production 1995 models do have 1,156 cc cast into the block. The 1200 Bandits have 15 tooth front sprockets and 45 tooth rear sprockets connected by 530V, 110 link rear chains.

1997

No changes. A version of the S Bandit with anti-lock braking was introduced for certain world markets. The 1997 ABS (anti-lock braking system) 1200 Bandit used a 114 link chain as opposed to the standard 110 link chain.

2001

The 1200 Bandits received a similar revamp to the one the 600 Bandits received the previous year:

- New rear bodywork.
- Fully electronic instrumentation.
- New carburettors.
- Suzuki PAIR (Pulsed Air Injection), feeding clean air into the exhaust outlet to help eliminate unburnt fuel from emissions.
- Additional fuel filter.
- Tokico brake callipers (six pistons at the front).
- 20 litre fuel tank (up from 19).
- Improvements to frame and steering geometry.
- Seat lowered.
- S model: New modern styled fairing, with twin headlights.

2004

2004 models added a 2-way catalytic converter (for some markets) to the exhaust system, and minor modifications to the exhaust metalwork.

2005

2005 models (K5 and SK5) were the last of the 2nd Generation 1200 Bandits.

2006

2006 (K6 and SK6) models received a revamp with a new shape tank, side panels, a height adjustable seat and a longer hexagonal-section swinging arm. The faired "S" versions also have a new shape fairing and mirrors along with a totally redesigned headlight system with over and under beams rather than the previous side by side system. These new models were offered with ABS brakes as an option. ABS brakes were fitted as standard on the UK specification SA model. Some markets also received height-adjustable handlebars. There were minor revisions to the transmission internal ratios as well. The 2006 Bandit 1200s were not sold in the US but continued to be sold elsewhere around the world. The SK6 version is in generation 3 of the Bandit 1200S line and thus is the sole generation 3 model of the 1200 Bandit. This was the last of the SACS-engined Bandits with a motor design and technology that first saw the light of day in 1985 in the GSX-R750.

== GSF1250 ==
GSF1250
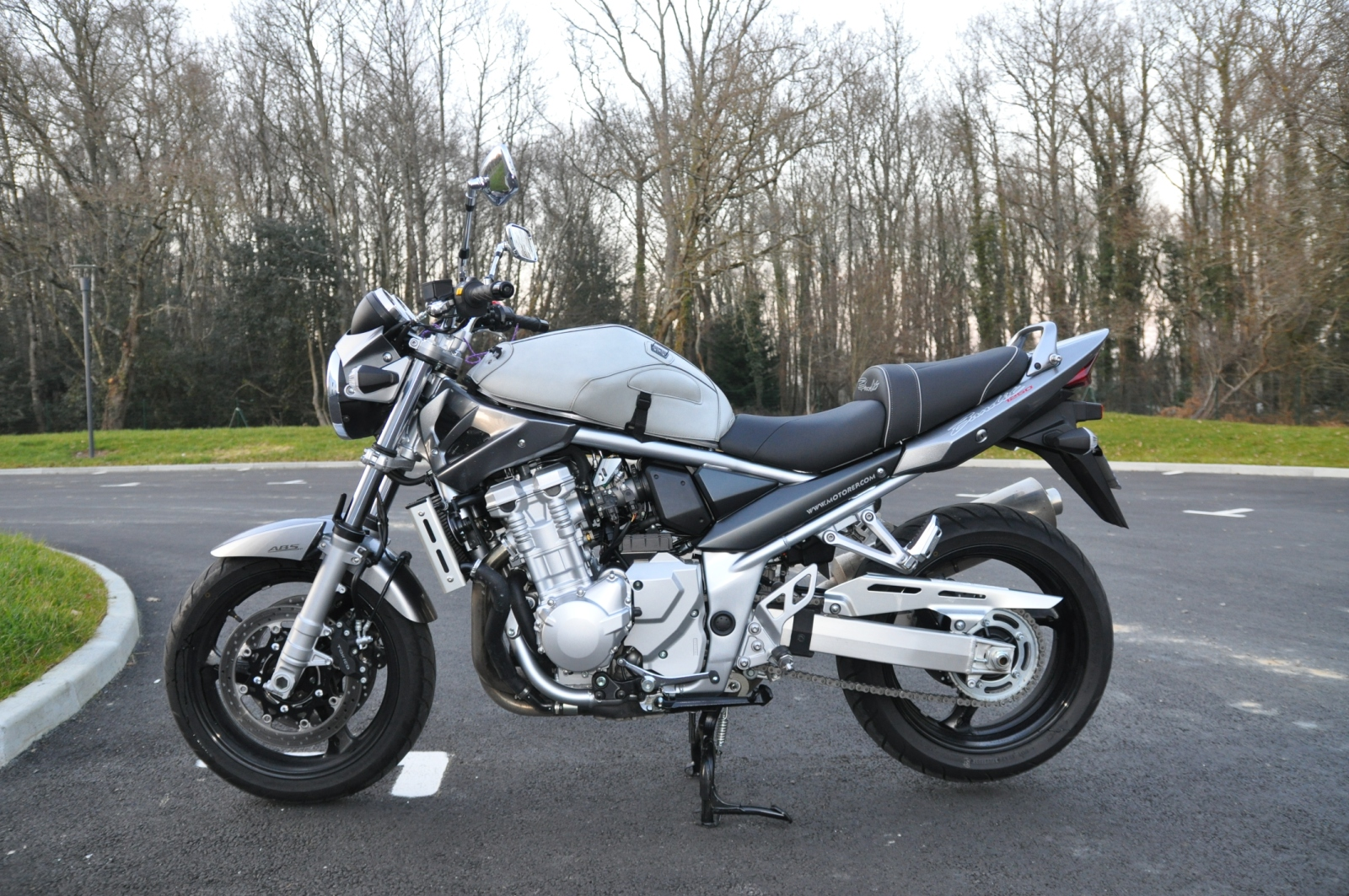
- 2010 Bandit GSF1250N
- Production: 2007–2016
- Predecessor: GSF1200
- Engine: 1,255 cc (76.6 cu in) liquid-cooled 4-stroke 16-valve DOHC inline-four
- Top speed: 225 km/h (140 mph)
- Power: 74.35 kW (99.7 hp; 101.1 PS) @ 8,780 rpm
- Torque: 106.6 N⋅m (78.6 lbf⋅ft) @ 3,540 rpm
- Transmission: 6-speed constant mesh
- Frame type: Steel tubular
- Suspension: Front: 43 mm (1.7 in) telescopic fork, adjustable spring preload; Rear: Aluminum-alloy swingarm, link type, adjustable rebound/preload
- Brakes: Front: 4-piston caliper with double 310 mm (12.2 in) discs; Rear: Single-piston caliper with single disc
- Wheelbase: 1,485 mm (58.5 in)
- Dimensions: L: 2,130 mm (83.9 in); W: 790 mm (31.1 in); H: 1,480 mm (58.3 in)
- Seat height: 790–810 mm (31.1–31.9 in) (adjustable)
- Weight: 225 kg (496 lb) (dry)
- Fuel capacity: 19 L (4.2 imp gal; 5.0 US gal)
- Fuel consumption: 39.7 mpg_{‑US} (5.92 L/100 km; 47.7 mpg_{‑imp})

2007

The GSF1250 Bandit range is launched. It has a new petrol injection, water-cooled engine which is compliant with Euro 3 emission regulations. The new engine generates similar power and torque to the earlier 1,200cc engine but the torque of 108 N⋅m (80 lbf⋅ft) is available at the lower engine speed of 3,750 RPM. An auxiliary balance shaft reduces engine vibrations. The GSF1250 also has a new six-speed constant mesh gearbox with the input shaft mounted below the crankshaft to reduce the length of the engine. This allows a longer swingarm.

The GSF1250SA version has ABS and Autumn 2007 saw the introduction of the limited edition Street Fighter, featuring a single seat with matching rear cowling, Renthal handlebars, and Yoshimura silencer.

2008

The 2007 GSF1250 and GSX1250SA are unchanged.

The 1250GT Grand Touring version is introduced with a three-box hard luggage system, fairing lowers and sat-nav.

2009

2009 models carry over the same engines. The cylinders were once again plated with Suzuki's "Composite Electrochemical Material", and carried over the secondary balancer shaft.

In May 2009, it was announced that there will be a limited edition Bandit 1250SA 'Z'. It has a pearl mirage white paint scheme, with revised graphics and metallic silver wheels. Only 100 examples came to the UK.

2010

In September 2009 it was announced that 2010 will see the release of the GSX1250FA in Europe. It has the same engine and chassis as before, but a full fairing will make it similar in style to the smaller GSX650F.

The standard 1250A and 1250SA models for 2010 will feature a black engine.

2011

GSX1250FA remains unchanged from 2010 but comes to the US as a 2011 model.

2015

Suzuki reintroduced the GSF1250SA Bandit with a new half-fairing designed to wrap around the radiator shrouds, and added a front vent below the headlight to smooth out airflow behind the fairing.

=== GSX1250F ===
In some markets, including both the UK and US, Suzuki has dropped the 'Bandit' name for the GSX1250 models. Produced from 2010 and last appearing as a 2012 model, it is essentially a fully faired version of the Bandit 1250 with top and side cases, windshield and more in its accessories list. Together with its partially faired model sibling it got a CARB certification and should return to the US market as a 2016 model.

== GSX150 ==
GSX150
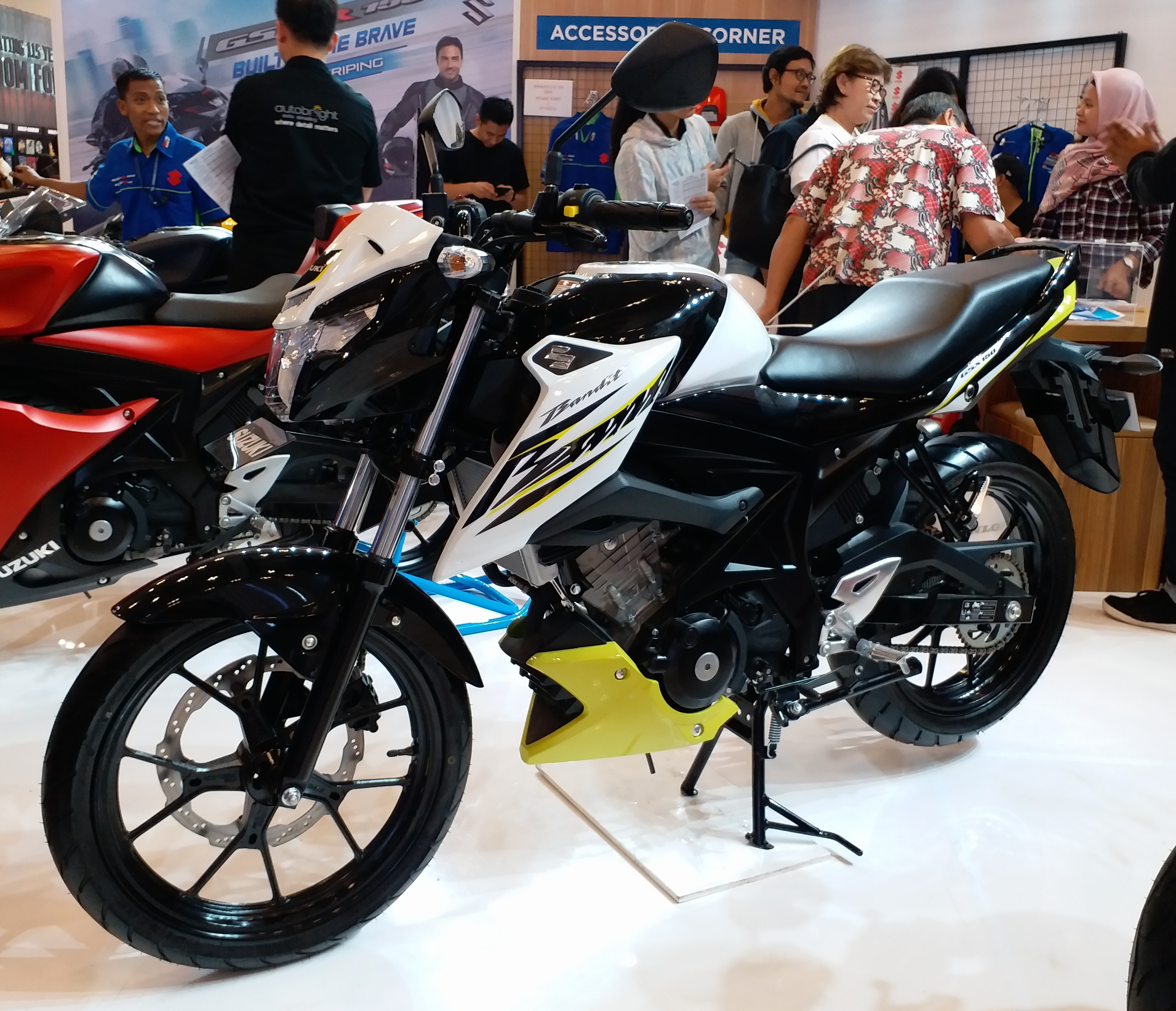
- Production: 2018–present
- Engine: 147.3 cc (8.99 cu in) liquid-cooled 4-stroke 4-valve DOHC single cylinder
- Bore / stroke: 62.0 mm × 48.8 mm (2.4 in × 1.9 in)
- Transmission: 6-speed constant mesh
- Frame type: Steel backbone
- Suspension: Front: Telescopic fork, adjustable spring preload; Rear: Steel swingarm with monoshock
- Brakes: Front: Dual-piston caliper with single 290 mm (11.4 in) disc; Rear: Single-piston caliper with single disc
- Tires: Front: 90/80–17 (tubeless); Rear: 130/70–17 (tubeless)
- Wheelbase: 1,300 mm (51.2 in)
- Dimensions: L: 2,000 mm (78.7 in); W: 745 mm (29.3 in); H: 1,035 mm (40.7 in)
- Seat height: 790 mm (31.1 in)
- Weight: 135 kg (298 lb) (dry)
- Fuel capacity: 11 L (2.4 imp gal; 2.9 US gal)
- Oil capacity: 1.3 L (0.3 imp gal; 0.3 US gal) (on exchange)
- Related: Suzuki GSX-R125/150; Suzuki GSX-S125/150

The first single-cylinder Bandit motorcycle, the GSX150 was introduced at the August 2018 Gaikindo Indonesia International Auto Show in South Tangerang. The GSX150 was built to accommodate Indonesian market demand for more comfortable commuter bike. It is based on the GSX-S150 standard motorcycle (itself based on the GSX-R150 sport bike) with changes on the headlight, taillight and chassis to support a lower tandem seat.

In March 2019, the GSX150 was launched in Thailand and is imported from Indonesia.
