= Suzuki LT-R450 =

Suzuki LT-R450 Quadracer

Overview
- Manufacturer: Suzuki
- Also called: QuadRacer R450
- Production: 2006–?

Body and chassis
- Class: Mid-size ATV
- Body style: ATV

Powertrain
- Engine: 450 cc (27.46 cu in) Single Cylinder
- Transmission: 5-speed manual

Dimensions
- Wheelbase: 1,285 mm (50.6 in)
- Length: 1,845 mm (72.6 in)
- Width: 1,245 mm (49.0 in)
- Height: 1,085 mm (42.7 in) (minus driver)
- Kerb weight: 167 kg (368 lb)

The Suzuki LT-R450 Quadracer was an all-terrain vehicle produced by Suzuki between 2006 and 2012. Intended as a race-ready ATV, the LT-R450 was developed with the help of WPSA ATV champion Doug Gust, and featured a fuel-injected 450 cc (27.46 cu in) 4-stroke DOHC single cylinder engine, based on the powerplant found in the RM-Z450 racer. The 2008 model was a significant update over the 2007 model, with a claimed power increase of 3 hp (2 kW) as well as over 100 upgrades. In 2009, Suzuki stopped importing the LT-R450 into the United States, after 25,396 units had been sold. As a result of emissions control breaches on both the LT-R450 and the RMX450Z, the EPA fined Suzuki US$885,000.

== See also ==
- Motocross
- All-terrain vehicle
