= List of Suzuki motorcycles =

List of Suzuki motorcycles.

Name	Engine (cc)	Type	Image
Boulevard series		Cruiser	
Boulevard C50 (VL800 Volusia)	805	Cruiser	
Boulevard C90 (Intruder VL1500)	1460	Cruiser	
Boulevard C109R (Intruder C1800R)	1783	Cruiser	
Boulevard M50 (Intruder M800)	805	Cruiser	
Boulevard M90R (Intruder M1500R)	1462	Cruiser	
Boulevard M109R (Intruder M1800R)	1783	Cruiser	
Boulevard S40 (LS650 Savage)	652	Cruiser	
Boulevard S50 (Intruder)	805	Cruiser	
Boulevard S83 (Intruder VS1400)	1360	Cruiser	
Intruder series		Cruiser	
VS400	400	Cruiser	
VS600	600	Cruiser	
VS700	700	Cruiser	
VS750	750	Cruiser	
VS800	805	Cruiser	
VS1400	1400	Cruiser	
Madura series (85,86 only)	700, 1200	Cruiser	
Marauder VZ800 (VZ800 Marauder)	805	Cruiser	
DL/V-Strom series		Dual-sport	
DL/V-Strom 250	248	Dual-sport	2020 Suzuki DL250
DL/V-Strom 650	645	Dual-sport	2005 Suzuki DL650
V-Strom 800DE/RE	776	Dual-sport	
DL/V-Strom 1000	1037	Dual-sport	2003 Suzuki DL1000 and 2006 Suzuki DL1000
DL/V-Strom 1050	1037	Dual-sport	2020 Suzuki DL1050 XT
RV/VanVan series		Dual-sport/off-road	
RV 50 VanVan	50	Dual-sport/off-road	
RV 75	75	Dual-sport/off-road	
RV 90 Rover	90	Dual-sport/off-road	
RV 125 VanVan	125	Dual-sport/off-road	
RV 200 VanVan	200	Dual-sport/off-road	
SMX50	50	Dual-sport/off-road	
SP series		Dual-sport/off-road	
SP100	100	Dual-sport/off-road	
SP125	125	Dual-sport/off-road	
SP200	200	Dual-sport/off-road	
SP250	250	Dual-sport/off-road	
SP370	370	Dual-sport/off-road	
SP400	400	Dual-sport/off-road	
SP500	500	Dual-sport/off-road	
SP600	600	Dual-sport/off-road	
TS series - Two Stroke Dual Purpose		Dual-sport/off-road	
TS50 Gaucho	50	Dual-sport/off-road	
TS75 Colt	75	Dual-sport/off-road	
TS80 Colt	80	Dual-sport/off-road	
TS90 Honcho	90	Dual-sport/off-road	
TS100 Honcho	100	Dual-sport/off-road	
TS125 Duster	125	Dual-sport/off-road	
TS185 Sierra	185	Dual-sport/off-road	
TS200	200	Dual-sport/off-road	
TS250 Savage	250	Dual-sport/off-road	
TS400 Apache	400	Dual-sport/off-road	
PE series - [Pure Enduro] - Two stroke		Enduro	1980 SUZUKI PE 400 T le canari
PE175	175	Enduro	
PE250	250	Enduro	
PE400	400	Enduro	
Burgman/Skywave series		Maxi-scooter	
Burgman 125	125	Maxi-scooter	
Burgman Street 125	125	Maxi-scooter	
Burgman/Skywave 200	200	Maxi-scooter	
Burgman/Skywave 400	400	Maxi-scooter	
Burgman/Skywave 650	650	Maxi-scooter	
Skywave 125	125	Scooter	
JR50	50	Minibike	JR50C
MT50 Trailhopper	50	Minibike	
PV50	50	Minibike	
RB50 GAG	50	Minibike	
GSV-R		MotoGP	
GSX-RR	1000	MotoGP	
RH72		Motocross	
TM series		Motocross	
TM75	75	Motocross	
TM100	100	Motocross	
TM125	125	Motocross	
TM250 (also known as RH67)	250	Motocross	
TM400	400	Motocross	
DR series - Four stroke		Motocross/Off-road/Dual-sport	
DR125	125	Motocross/Off-road/Dual-sport	
DR200SE	200	Motocross/Off-road/Dual-sport	
DR250	249	Motocross/Off-road/Dual-sport	
DR350	349	Motocross/Off-road/Dual-sport	
DR600	600	Motocross/Off-road/Dual-sport	
DR650	650	Motocross/Off-road/Dual-sport	
DR800	800	Off-road	
DR-Z series - Four stroke		Motocross/Off-road/Dual-sport	
DR-Z70	70	Motocross/Off-road/Dual-sport	
DR-Z110	110	Motocross/Off-road/Dual-sport	
DR-Z125	125	Motocross/Off-road/Dual-sport	
DR-Z250	250	Motocross/Off-road/Dual-sport	
DR-Z400	400	Motocross/Off-road/Dual-sport	Suzuki DR-Z400
DR-Z4S	400	Dual-sport/off-road	Suzuki DR-Z4S
RM/RMX series - Two stroke		Motocross/off-road	
RM50	50	Motocross/off-road	
RM60	60	Motocross/off-road	
RM65	65	Motocross/off-road	
RM80	80	Motocross/off-road	
RM80X	80	Motocross/off-road	
RM85	85	Motocross/off-road	
RM100	100	Motocross/off-road	
RM125	125	Motocross/off-road	
RM250	250	Motocross/off-road	Suzuki RM250
RMX250	250	Motocross/off-road	
RM370	370	Motocross/off-road	
RM400	400	Motocross/off-road	1979 Suzuki RM400
RMX450Z	450	Motocross/off-road	
RM465	465	Motocross/off-road	
RM500	500	Motocross/off-road	
RM-Z Series - Four stroke		Motocross/off-road	
RM-Z250	250	Motocross/off-road	Suzuki RM-Z250
RM-Z450	450	Motocross/off-road	Suzuki RM-Z450
RF series		Sport-touring	
DS50	50	Off-road	
DS80	80	Off-road	
DS100	100	Off-road	
DS125	125	Off-road	
DS185	185	Off-road	
RS175	175	Off-road	
RS250	250	Off-road	
TC series - Two Stroke Dual Purpose w/dual range transmission		Off-road	
TC90 Blazer	90	Off-road	
TC100	100	Off-road	
TC125 Prospector	125	Off-road	
TC185 Ranger	185	Off-road	
TC200 Stingray	200	Off-road	
TC250 Hustler	250	Off-road	
TC305 Laredo	305	Off-road	
Access 125	125	Scooter/Moped	
Address series		Scooter/Moped	
Address 50	49	Scooter/Moped	
Address R50	49	Scooter/Moped	
Address V50	49	Scooter/Moped	
Address V100	100	Scooter/Moped	
Address 110	110	Scooter/Moped	
Address V125 Police Scooter	125	Scooter/Moped	
AE50 style	49	Scooter/Moped	
AY50 Katana	50	Scooter/Moped	
CS	49; 75; 125	Scooter/Moped	
CP50/80	49/79	Scooter/Moped	
Sepia ZZ	49	Scooter/Moped	
SJ50	49	Scooter/Moped	Suzuki SJ50QT made for Suzuki by the Chinese Jincheng Group
RC50	49	Scooter/Moped	
Choinori	49	Scooter/Moped	
Choinori SS	49	Scooter/Moped	
FA50	49	Scooter/Moped	
FM50 (Suzuki Landie)	50	Scooter/Moped	
FS50 snip	50	Scooter/Moped	
FZ50	50	Scooter/Moped	
FY50 youdy	50	Scooter/Moped	
M30 Mokick (Suzy 50)	50	Scooter/Moped	
M31 (Suzy 55)	55	Scooter/Moped	
Suzuki Let's	112.8	Scooter/Moped	
SJK Mini Free MF1 (1954)		Scooter/Moped	
Suzuki Suzumoped		Scooter/Moped	
FX110		Scooter/Moped	
Sixteens		Scooter/Moped	
Gemma	250	Scooter/Moped	
FXR150	150	Sport	Suzuki FXR150
GSX-R series		Sport	
GSX-R50	50	Sport	
GSX-R125	125	Sport	
GSX-R150	150	Sport	
GSX-R250	250	Sport	
GSX-R400	400	Sport	
GSX-R600	600	Sport	
GSX-R750	750	Sport	
GSX-R1000	1000	Sport	
GSX-R1100	1100	Sport	
GSX-1300R Hayabusa	1300	Sport	
GSX-8R	775	Sport	
GSX-8S	775	Sport	
GSX-8T/8TT	775	Sport	
GSX-10R	1000	Sport	
Satria R		Sport	
Suzuki SFV650 Gladius	650	Sport	
SV650	645	Sport	
SV1000	1000	Sport	
SV-7GX	650	Sport touring	
SV-7S	650	Sport	
TL1000R	1000	Sport	
TL1000S	1000	Sport	
XN85	675	Sport	
A series		Street	
A50	49	Street	
A70	69	Street	
A80	72	Street	
A100	98	Street	
AX100	100	Street	
TS125R	125	Street	
GF 250	250	Street	
GN series		Street	
GN125	125	Street	
GN250	250	Street	
GN400	400	Street	
GR650	650	Street	
Gixxer SF 150	150	Street	
Gixxer SF 250	250	Sport/Street	
GS series		Street	
GS125	125	Street	
GS150	150	Street	
GS150R	150	Street	
GS250	250	Street	
GS300	300	Street	
GS400	400	Street	
GS425	425	Street	
GS450	450	Street	
GS500	500	Street	
GS550L	550	Street	
GS650	650	Street	
GS700	700	Street	
GS750	750	Street	
GS850	850	Street	
GS1000	1000	Street	
GS1100	1100	Street	
Bandit series		Street	
GSF600	600	Street	
GSF1200	1200	Street	
GSF1250	1250	Street	
GW250	250	Street	
GSR400	400	Street	
GSR600	600	Street	
GSR750	750	Street	
GSR1000/Virus 1000	1000	Street	
GSX series		Street	
GSX 150/GSX 150F SF	150	Street	
GSX 250	250	Street	
GSX 250F (also known as Across)	250	Street	
GSX 250S Katana	250	Street	
GSX 400	400	Street	
GSX 400S	400	Street	
GSX 400S Katana	400	Street	
GSX 550EF	550	Street	
GSX 600F	600	Street	
GSX 650F	650	Street	
GSX 700	700	Street	
GSX 750	750	Street	
GSX 750F	750	Street	
GSX 750S Katana	750	Street	
GSX-8S	776	Street	
GSX 1000	1000	Street	
GSX 1000S Katana	1000	Street	
GSX-F / Katana series		Street	
GSX-S125	124	Street	
GSX-S150	147	Street	
GSX-S1000	1000	Street	
GSX-S1000F	1000	Street	
GSX 1100F	1100	Street	
GSX 1100S Katana	1100	Street	
GSX 1100 E/EF	1100	Street	
GSX 1200 Inazuma	1200	Street	
GSX 1400	1400	Street	
GT series		Street	
GT50	50	Street	
GT100	100	Street	
GT125	125	Street	
GT185 Adventurer	185	Street	
GT200 Invader/X5	200	Street	
GT250 Hustler/X7	250	Street	
GT380 Sebring	380	Street	
GT500 Titan	500	Street	
GT550	550	Street	
GT750	750	Street	
GX series		Street	
GX125	125	Street	
GZ125 Marauder	125	Cruiser	
GZ150	150	Cruiser	
GZ250 Marauder	250	Cruiser	
OR50	50	Street	
LS 650 savage	650	custom	
RE5	500	Street	
RC 80	80	Motorcycle Automatic	
RC 100 JetCooled	100	Motorcycle Automatic	
RC 110 Crystal	110	Motorcycle Automatic	
RC 100 GS Tornado	100	Motorcycle Automatic	
RC 110 GX Tornado	110	Motorcycle Automatic	
RG series		2-stroke Sport/Underbone	
RG50	50	Sport	
RG110	110	Underbone	
RG120	120	Underbone	
RG125	125	Sport	
RG150/RGR150	150	Sport	
RG200 Gamma	200	Sport	
RG250 Gamma	250	Sport	
RG400	400	Sport	
RG500	500	Sport	
RGV250	250	Sport	
RGV500	500	Sport	
SB200	200	Street	
SW-1	250	Street	
T series		Street	
T90 Wolf	90	Street	
T125 Stinger	125	Street	
T200 Invader (also known as X5)	200	Street	
T10	250	Street	
T20 "Hustler" (also known as X6)	250	Street	
T250 Hustler	250	Street	
T305 Raider	305	Street	
T350 Rebel	350	Street	
T500 Titan	500	Street	
TU250/ST250	250	Street	
VX 800	805	Street	
X7		Street	
EN 125	125	Street	
B-King	1340	Streetfighter	
GV1400 Cavalcade	1360	Touring	
FR50	50	Underbone	
FR70	70	Underbone	
FR80	80	Underbone	
Stinger 120	120	Underbone	
FX125	125	Underbone	
Raider 150	150	Underbone	
Satria	120; 150	Underbone	
Shogun 110	110	Underbone	
Shogun 125	125	Underbone	
Smash	110	Underbone	
Crosscage - Fuel Cell		Concept/Prototype	
Stratosphere		Concept/Prototype	
Skywave Type-S		Concept/Prototype	
Address V50G		Concept/Prototype	
Biplane		Concept/Prototype	
Nuda		Concept/Prototype	
G-Strider		Concept/Prototype	
Recursion		Concept/Prototype	
