= Suzuki Boulevard =

The Suzuki Boulevard range of motorcycles includes:

- Suzuki Boulevard C109R
- Suzuki Boulevard C90
- Suzuki Boulevard C50
- Suzuki Boulevard M109R
- Suzuki Boulevard M90
- Suzuki Boulevard M50
- Suzuki Boulevard S40
- Suzuki Boulevard S50
- Suzuki Boulevard S83
