= Suzuki RG series =

The Suzuki RG Series is a series of two-stroke sport motorcycles and underbones made by Suzuki.

It includes the following models:

- Suzuki RG50
- Suzuki RG110
- Suzuki RG120
- Suzuki RG125
- Suzuki RG150
- Suzuki RG200
- Suzuki RG250
- Suzuki RG250 Gamma
- Suzuki RG500
- Suzuki RG 500
- Suzuki RG 500 Gamma
