= S83 =

S83 may refer to:

- Daihatsu Hijet (S83), a kei truck and microvan
- S83 Lankao–Nanyang Expressway, China
- Savoia-Marchetti S.83 an Italian airliner
- Suzuki Boulevard S83, a motorcycle
