= Suzuki GF250 =

Road motorbike

- Manufacturer: Suzuki
- Production: 1985-1990
- Predecessor: Suzuki GS250FW
- Successor: Suzuki Across
- Class: Sport bike
- Engine: 249 cc (15.2 cu in) liquid-cooled 4-stroke DOHC inline-four
- Top speed: 180 km/h (110 mph)
- Power: 41–45 PS (30–33 kW) @ 12,500 rpm (crank)
- Torque: 2.4 kg⋅m (24 N⋅m; 17 lbf⋅ft) @ 10,500 rpm
- Transmission: 6-speed constant mesh
- Brakes: Front: Dual piston single disc Rear: Single piston disc
- Weight: 139 kg (306 lb) (dry)

The Suzuki GF 250 was a water-cooled four-cylinder four-stroke road motorbike. The engine block and transmission were the same as the GSX-R250. It did not rev as high (13000 redline) as the GSX-R series, but had several finer points like adjustable dampening on the suspension. It has 2pot brakes on the front and single on the rear. It was produced in the late 1980s and early 1990s. Top speed was about 180 km/h. There were one- and two-seat versions.

The GF250 was introduced in 1985 and was a redesign of the GS250FW, and the frame and bodywork were completely redesigned. The new frame was lighter and lowered the seat height to 750mm. The GF250 also had a disc rear brake.

Early models had no fairing, but later models (from 1988) had a small frame-mounted half-fairing, twin front brake discs and more power. A sticker on one of the fork legs advertised "Deca Piston", there now being four pistons per disc up front and two at the back. Other important changes were made to the engine - larger inlet valves, altered timing, an increase in compression ratio, lighter internal engine components, and a new four-into-one exhaust system.

Early models were available in white and blue. Later models were available in white and blue, red and black, and gray, red and black.

The GF250 was succeeded by the Suzuki Across (motorcycle).
