= Suzuki DR series =

The Suzuki DR Series is a series of off-road motorcycles made by Suzuki:

- Suzuki DR125
- Suzuki DR200
- Suzuki DR250
- Suzuki DR350
- Suzuki DR-Z400
- Suzuki DR600
- Suzuki DR650
- Suzuki DR800
