= Suzuki Across =

The Suzuki Across may refer to:

- Suzuki Across (motorcycle), a sport bike produced by Suzuki from 1990 until 1998
- Suzuki Across (crossover), a compact crossover SUV based on the Toyota RAV4 produced since 2020
- Suzuki Victoris, also sold as the Across since 2025
