= Suzuki GS150R =

Indian motorbike

- Manufacturer: Suzuki Motorcycle India Limited
- Also called: Lanza
- Parent company: Suzuki
- Production: 2008 - 2015
- Successor: Suzuki Gixxer
- Class: 150 cc
- Engine: 149.5 cc, Type Four-stroke, Air-cooled, SOHC, Compression ratio= 9.35/1, Carburetor= BS26 with TPS, Ignition= CDI, Starting methods= Electric & kick
- Transmission: 6-speed manual (1-down, 5-up)
- Suspension: Front: Telescopic, Coil Spring, Oil Damped, Rear: Swingarm Type Coil Spring, Oil and Damped
- Brakes: Front: Hydraulic single disc, Rear: Drum
- Tires: Front: 2.75-18 42P, Rear: 100/90-18 M/C 56P
- Wheelbase: 1,340 mm
- Dimensions: L: 2,095 mm W: 775 mm H: 1,120 mm
- Seat height: 790 mm
- Weight: 134 kg, Curb Mass = 149 kg (dry)
- Fuel capacity: 15.5 litres

The Suzuki GS150R is a 150cc motorcycle from Suzuki Motorcycle India. The bike was launched in November 2008. With the GS150R, Suzuki Motorcycle India entered the highly competitive 150cc segment of the Indian motorcycle market. Suzuki Motorcycle India states that the bike falls "in-between" the two classes of Indian 150 cc motorcycles, namely commuter class and premium class. The GS150R has a sixth gear for cruising on highways.

== Suzuki GS150 ==
A relatively traditional variant; the Suzuki GS150 motorcycle is manufactured by Pak Suzuki and sold in Pakistan under the GS150 brand name. A similar version is sold in the Philippines as Suzuki Mola 150. It is equipped with a Single cylinder four-stroke motor which produces a maximum peak output power of 13.8 hp and has a dry weight of 114 kg. Suzuki GS150 has a Steel frame with front suspension being Telescopic fork, coil spring, oil damped and at the rear, it is equipped with Swing-arm, coil spring, oil damped. Stock tire sizes are 2.75-18 on the front and 3.00-18 on the rear. As for stopping power, the Suzuki GS150 braking system includes Disk Brake at the front wheel and Expanding brake (drum brake) at the rear wheel. Overall, the styling of this bike and a relatively flat seat, are more suited to the traditional sitting posture of women in Pakistan who sit behind the rider with both legs on one side.

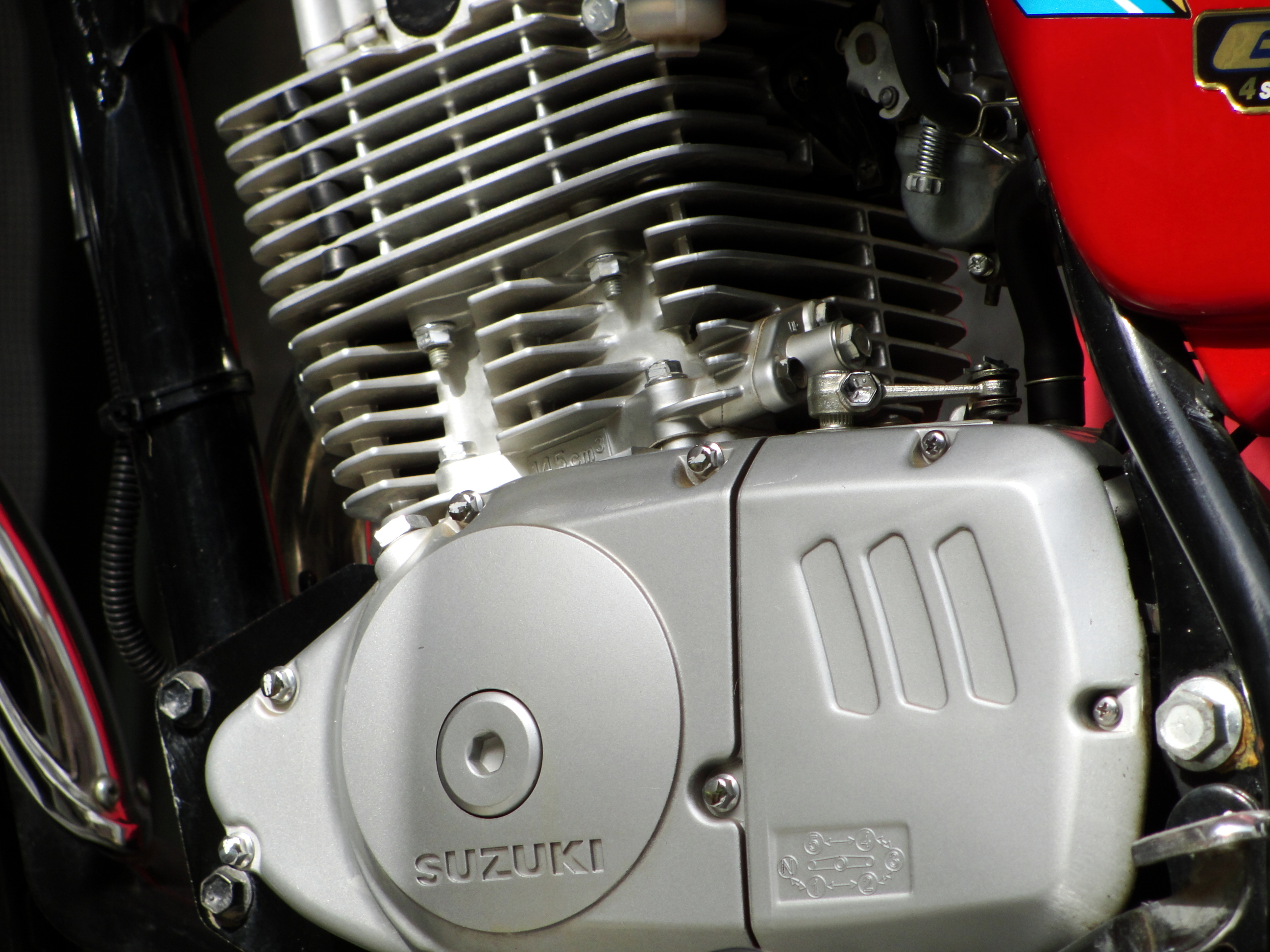
Suzuki GS150 Engine Closeup

Suzuki GS150
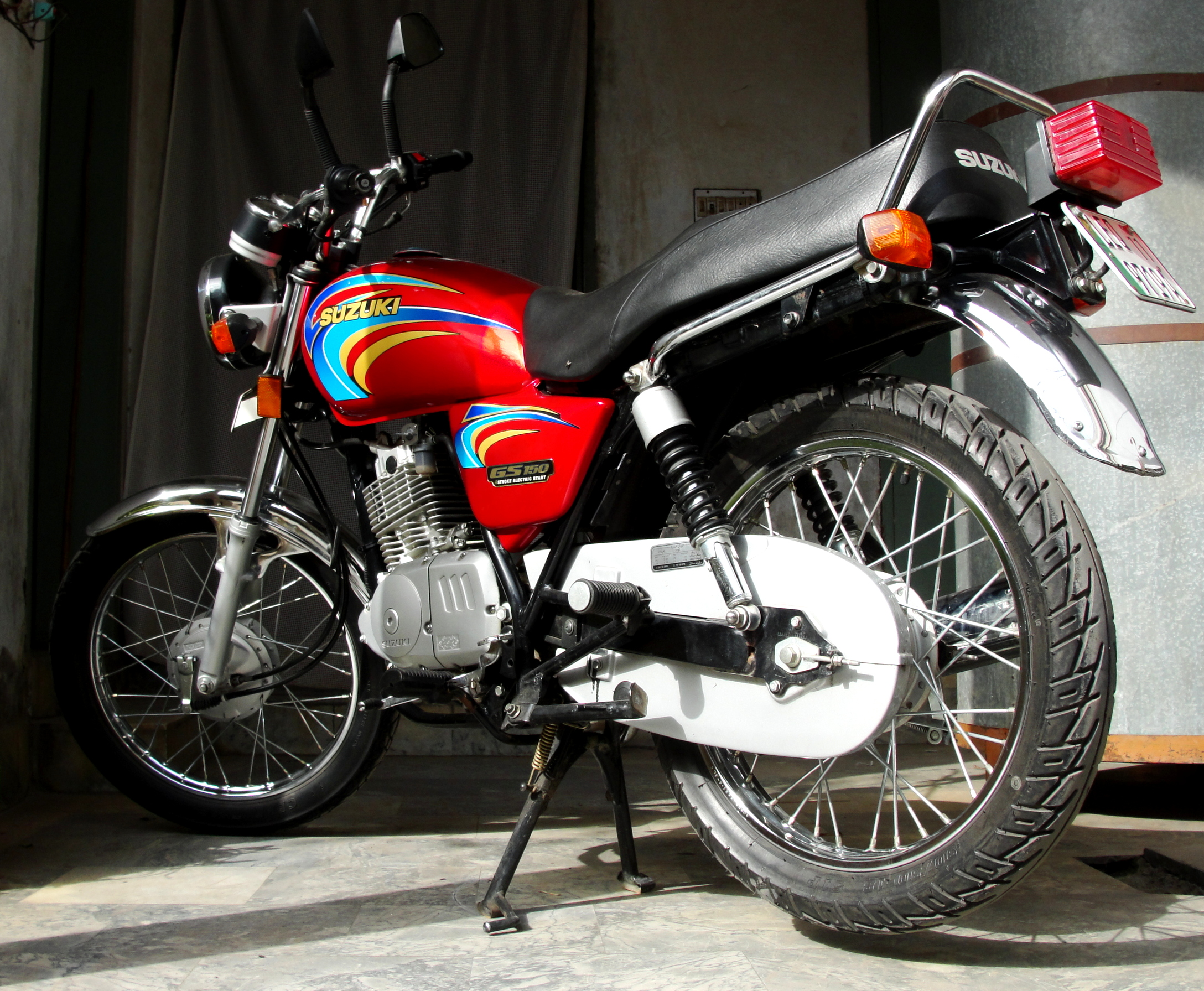
- Suzuki GS150 2011 Model
- Manufacturer: Pak Suzuki Motor Company Limited (PSMCL)
- Also called: GS150SE
- Parent company: Suzuki
- Assembly: Karachi
- Predecessor: Suzuki GS125
- Successor: Suzuki GS150R
- Class: Naked Bike
- Engine: 150cc 4-Stroke Single Cylinder OHC Air Cooled
- Bore / stroke: 57.0mm x 56.8mm
- Compression ratio: 9.2:1
- Top speed: 110Km/h
- Power: 13.8hp
- Ignition type: CDI
- Transmission: 5-Speed constant mesh
- Frame type: Steel
- Suspension: Front: Telescopic, Coil Spring, Oil Damped, Rear: Swing-Arm, Coil Spring, Oil Damped
- Brakes: Front Disk, Rear Drum
- Tires: Front 2.75-18 Rear 90/90-18
- Wheelbase: 1,280mm
- Dimensions: L: 2,005mm W: 785mm H: 1,065mm
- Weight: 114Kg (dry)
- Fuel capacity: 12.0L

== Awards ==
The GS150R has been named the ‘Motorcycle of the Year 2010 up to 160cc' by NDTV Profit's Car Bike Awards 2010.
