= Suzuki GSR600 =

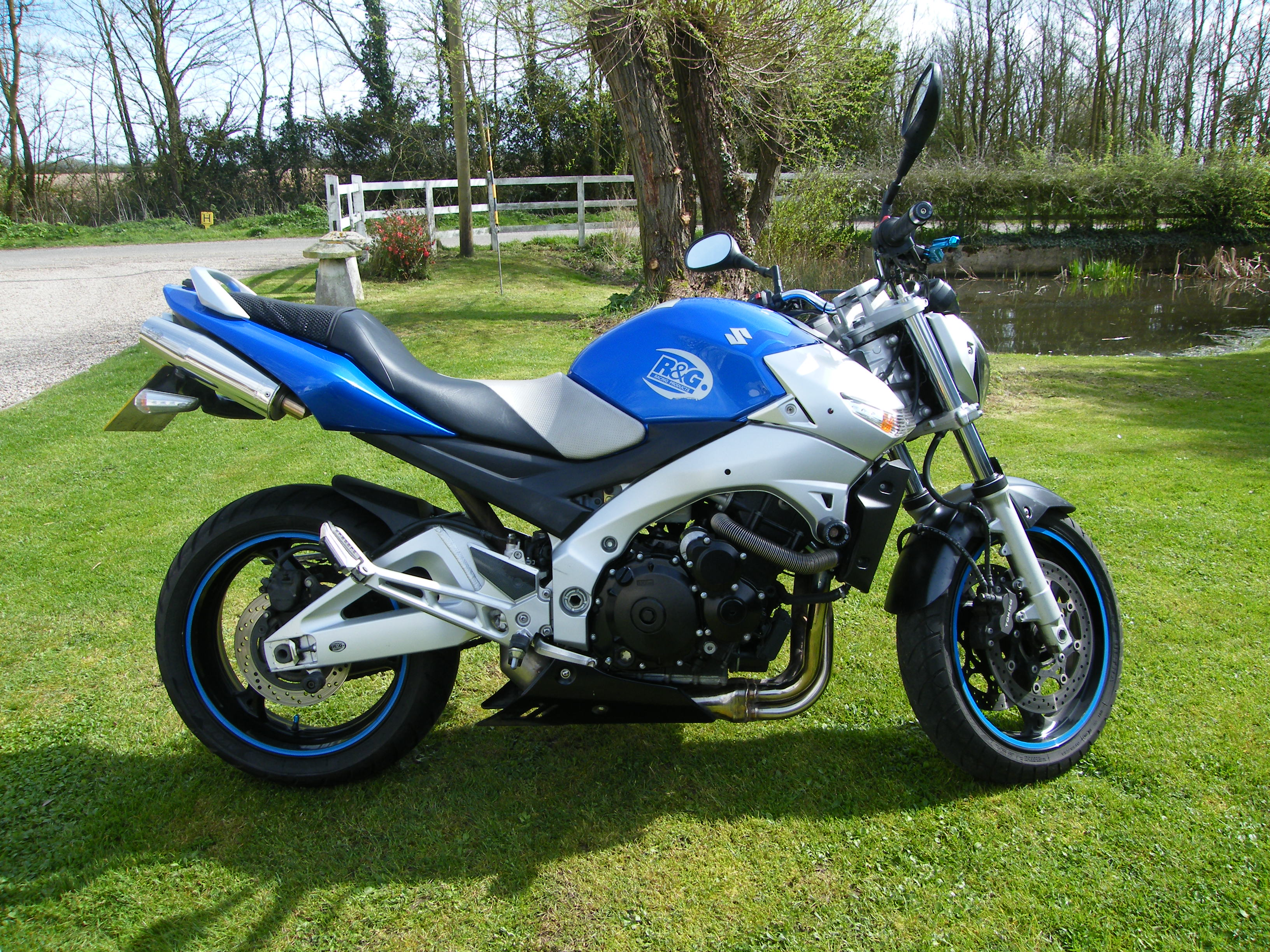
- 2006 GSR600
- Manufacturer: Suzuki
- Also called: Baby B-King
- Production: 2006–2011
- Successor: Suzuki GSR750
- Class: Standard
- Engine: Liquid-cooled DOHC 16V 599 cc (36.6 cu in) inline-four
- Transmission: 6-speed with multi-plate clutch
- Rake, trail: 25.5°, 104 mm (4.1 in)
- Wheelbase: 1,440 mm (57 in)
- Dimensions: L: 2,090 mm (82 in); W: 795 mm (31.3 in)
- Seat height: 785 mm (30.9 in)
- Fuel capacity: 16.5 L (3.6 imp gal; 4.4 US gal)
- Related: Suzuki Bandit Series; Suzuki B-King

The Suzuki GSR600 is a 599 cc (36.6 cu in) motorcycle made by Suzuki since in 2006, introduced as a streetfighter-styled middleweight street-bike using the 2004 GSXR-600 engine. The engine is re-tuned for more usable midrange power as well as higher torque. The rear shock's rebound and compression is adjustable.

== History ==
In 2001, Suzuki unveiled B-King concept bike, with a tuned GSX-1300R Hayabusa engine, as well as a radical design for a street bike. It left a major impression to motorcycle enthusiasts everywhere.

The B-King however did not hit production until 2007. Instead, the GSR600 was unveiled in December 2005. With a very similar design styling, it was initially nicknamed the "Baby B-King" or "Baby King" by the motorcycle community.

It had various parts normally reserved for higher-end flagship models, such as the four-piston Toxico brake system used also on the GSX-R600 series.

== 2006 model ==
The first model arrived at dealerships in January 2006.

== 2006 S-model ==
A variant of the model, called the GSR600S or 'S'-model, was released middle of 2006. It differs from the standard model with a stock windshield, a radiator protector grill as well as carbon-fibre lamination for selected parts.

== 2007 to latest model ==
ABS was introduced to the range in 2007 across different markets. This variation was sold as the GSR600A.

== GSR400 ==
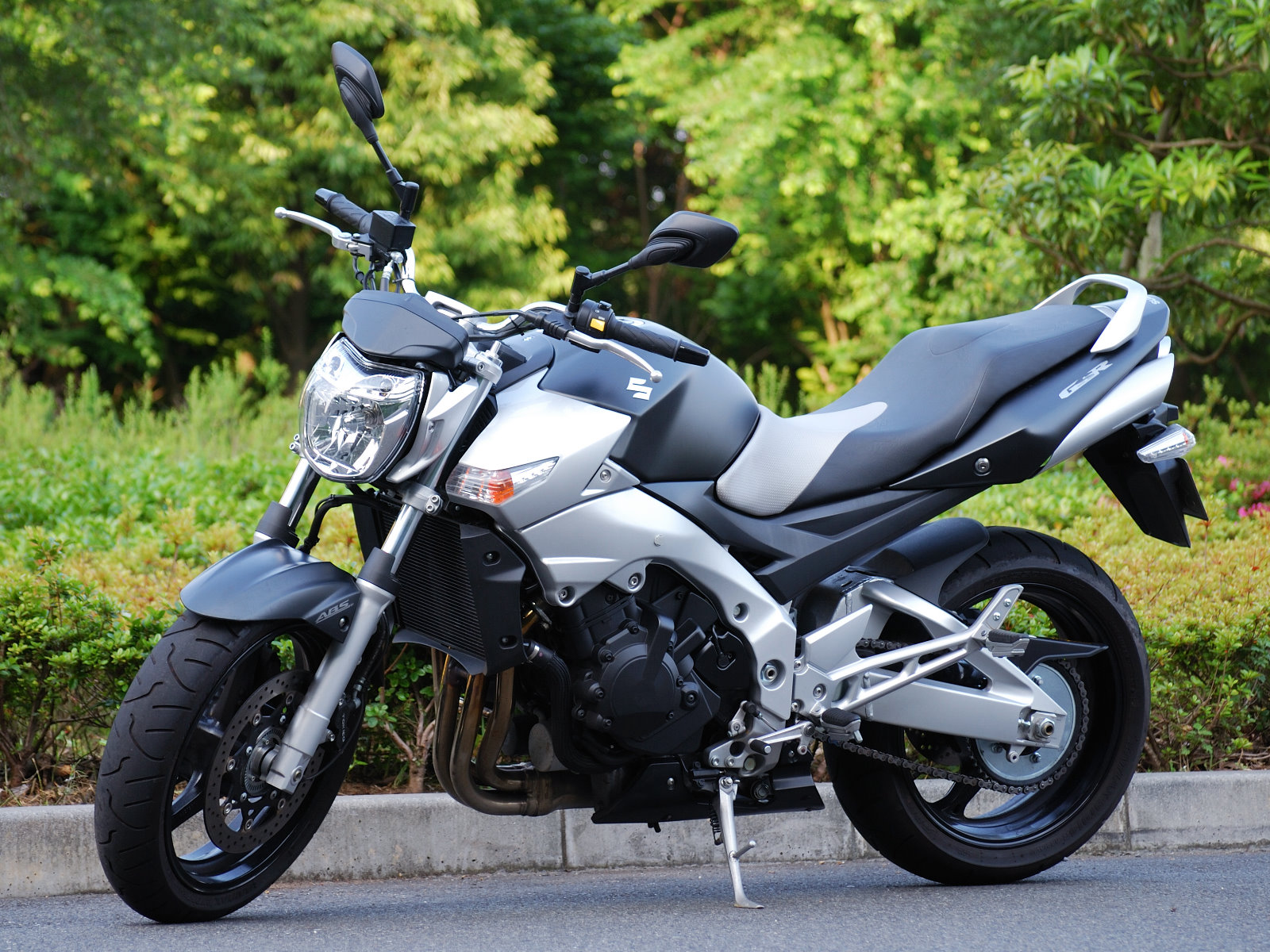
Suzuki GSR400

A Japanese domestic market model, the GSR400, become available to selected countries in the middle of 2006. With the same dimensions as the GSR600, the only difference was the engine capacity (399 cc as opposed to 599 cc), a smaller exhaust outlet, smaller RPM range and a useful plastic protective cover on the left side of the engine.

== Specifications and Performance ==
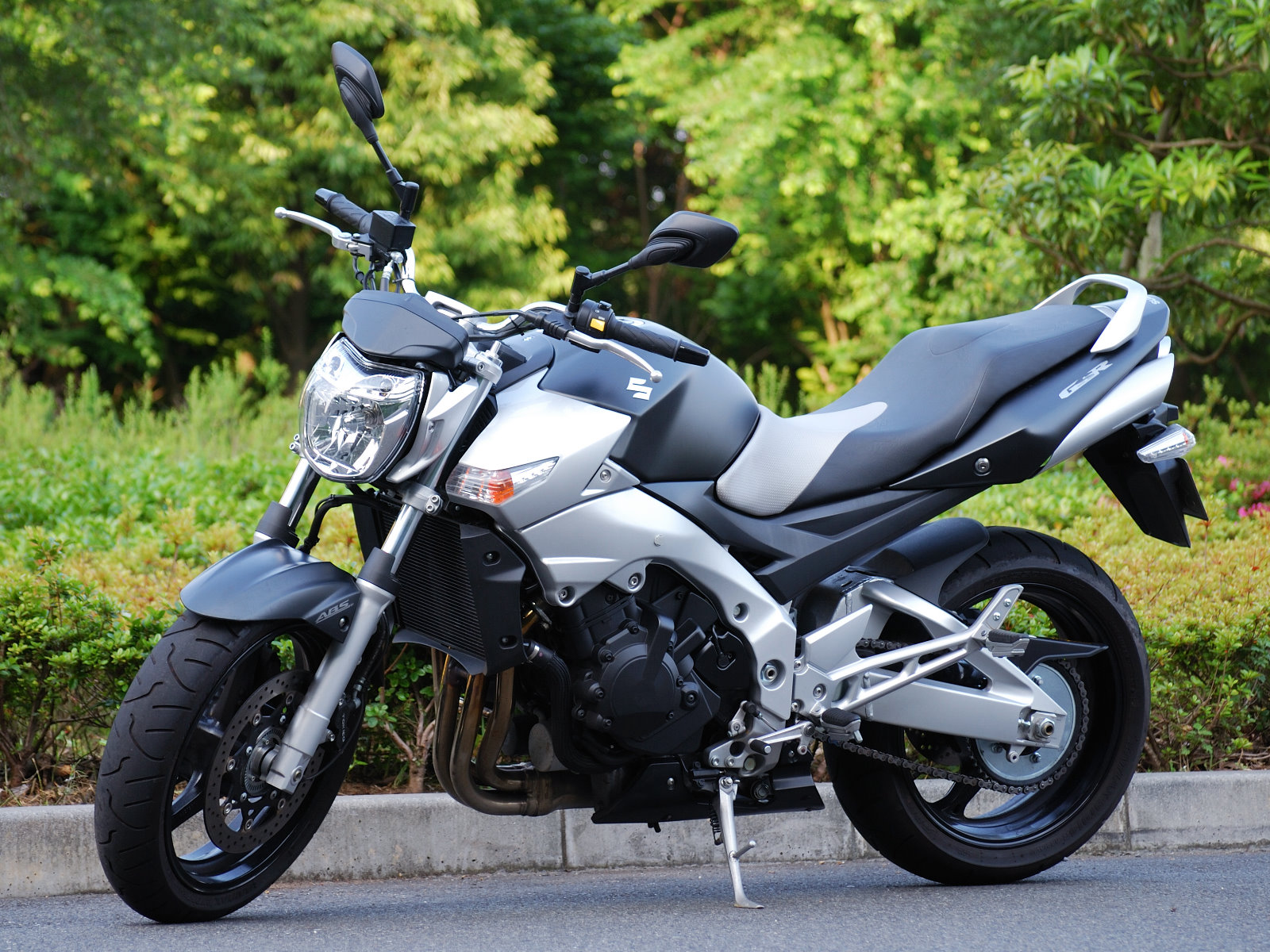
Suzuki GSR400

Engine	Transverse four cylinder, DOHC, 16-valve
Cooling	Water cooled with radiator fan
Fuel system	Electronic fuel injection
Gearbox	Six speed, manual
Drive	Chain
Clutch	Wet multi-disc
Fuel Capacity	16.5 L (3.6 imp gal; 4.4 US gal)
Dry Weight	183 kg (403 lb)
Tyres	Front: 120/70-17ZR Rear: 180/55-17ZR
Maximum Power	98 hp (73 kW) @ 12,000 rpm
Maximum Torque	65 N⋅m (48 lbf⋅ft) @ 9,600 rpm
Top Speed	250 km/h (160 mph)
Engine speed limit	14,000 rpm
