= Suzuki Gemma =

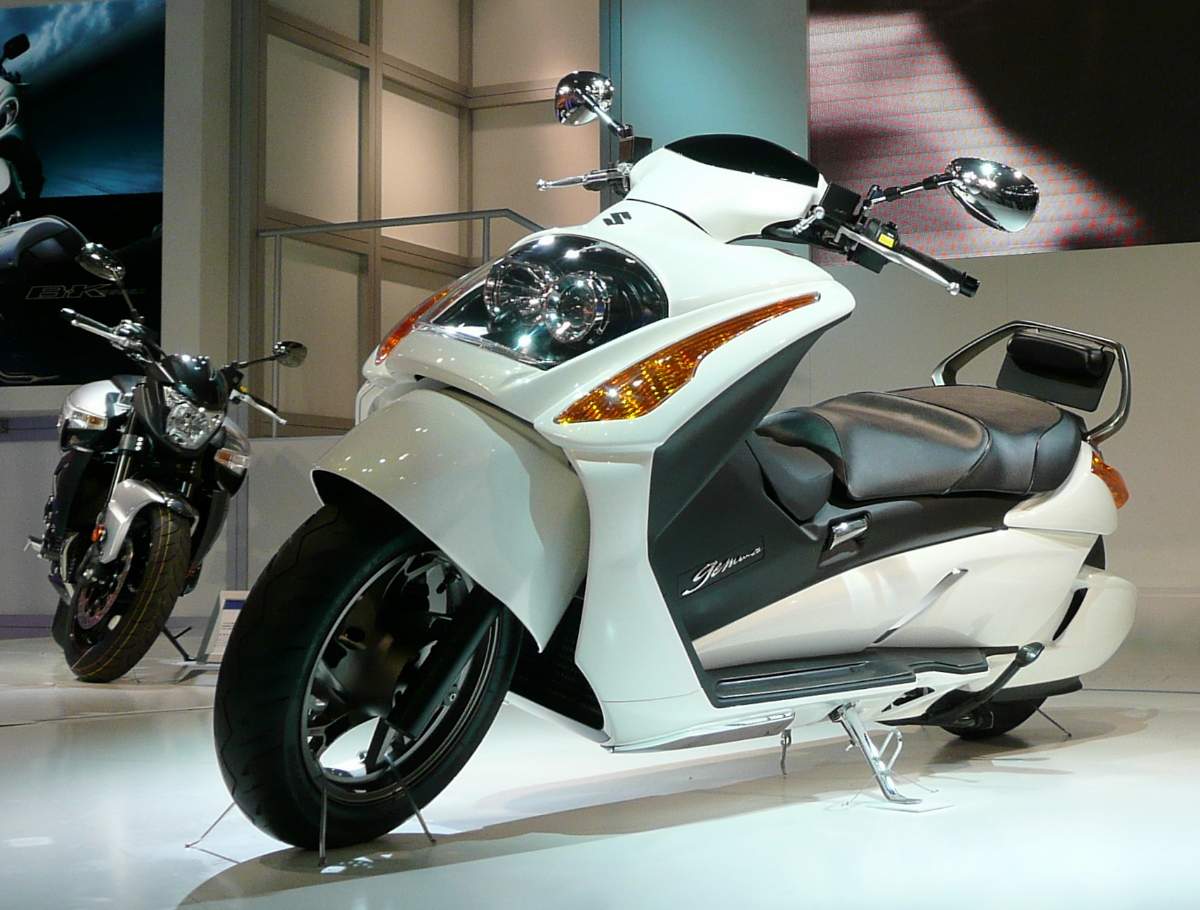
- Gemma prototype at 2007 Tokyo Motor Show
- Manufacturer: Suzuki Motor
- Production: 2008–2012
- Class: Scooter
- Engine: 249 cc DOHC single
- Tires: Front: 14 inch wheel Rear: 13 inch
- Dimensions: L: 2350 mm W: 760 mm H: 1050 mm
- Weight: c. 166 kg (366 lb) (dry)
- Related: Suzuki Burgman 250

The Suzuki Gemma is a motor scooter introduced as a concept motorcycle at the Tokyo Motor Show in October 2007, and commercially available in Japan beginning in 2008. It is not a step-through frame design like most scooters; instead, there is a cargo compartment ahead of the operator and between the operator's legs.

The 250 cc single-cylinder gasoline engine is shared with the Suzuki Burgman 250 scooter.
