= Suzuki Boulevard C50 =

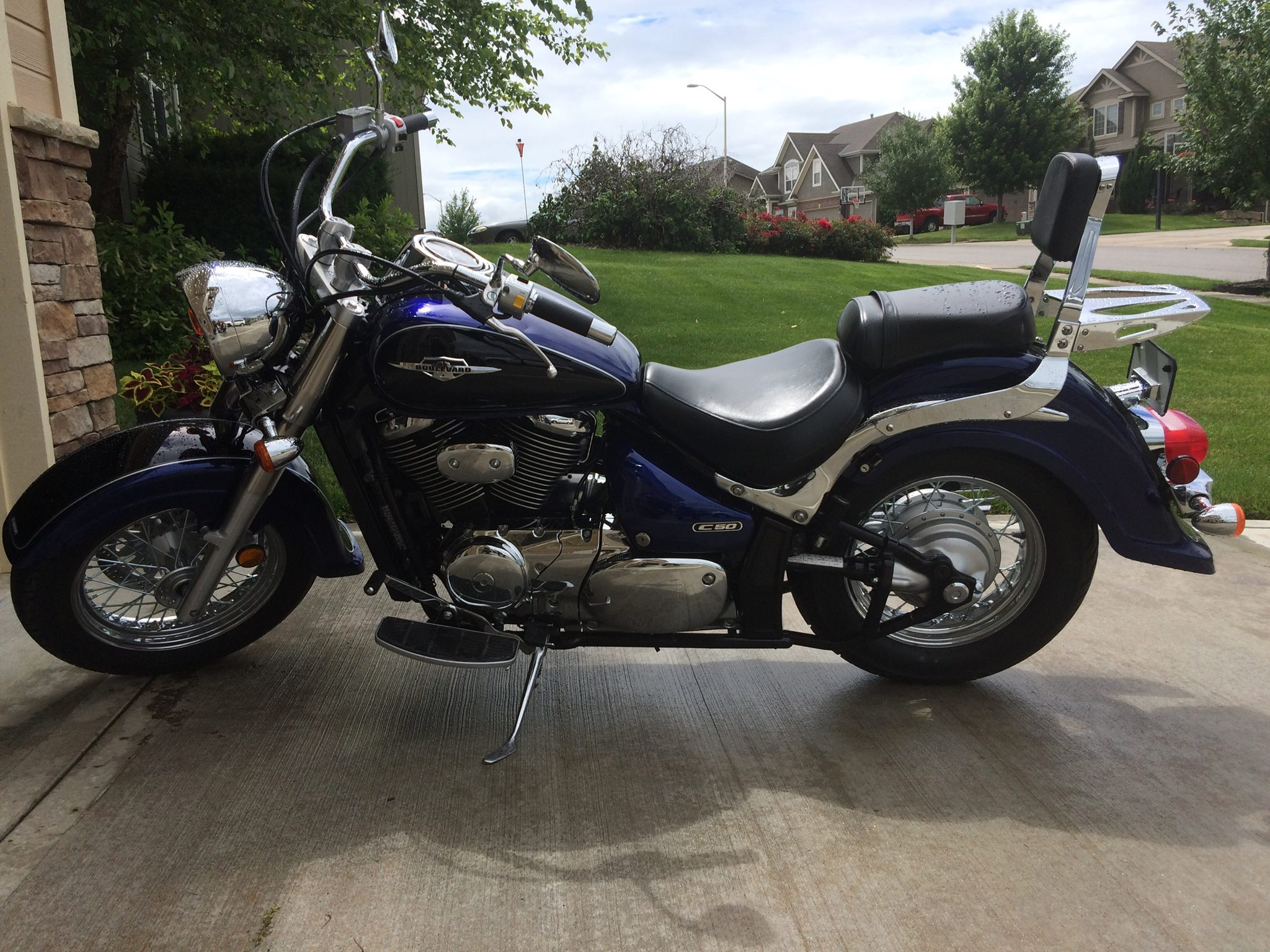
- 2005 model
- Manufacturer: Suzuki
- Production: 2001–
- Class: Cruiser
- Engine: 805 cc (49.1 cu in) 45° 4-stroke V-twin, liquid-cooled
- Bore / stroke: 83.0 mm × 74.4 mm (3.27 in × 2.93 in)
- Compression ratio: 9.4:1
- Power: 52 hp (39 kW)
- Torque: 51 lb⋅ft (69 N⋅m)
- Ignition type: Electronic (transistorized)
- Transmission: 5-speed, shaft drive
- Suspension: Front: telescopic fork Rear: link-type single shock
- Brakes: Front: 300 mm disc Rear: 180 mm drum
- Tires: Front: 130/90-16; Rear: 170/80-15
- Rake, trail: 33°
- Wheelbase: 1,655 mm (65.2 in)
- Dimensions: L: 2,500 mm (98 in); W: 955 mm (37.6 in)
- Seat height: 700 mm (28 in)
- Weight: 611 lbs/277 kilo (dry)
- Fuel capacity: 16 L; 3.4 imp gal (4.1 US gal)
- Related: Boulevard C90, Boulevard C109

The Suzuki Boulevard C50 (VL800) is a cruiser motorcycle made by Suzuki Motor Corporation since 2001. Prior to 2005, the model was named the Volusia for Volusia County, Florida, where it was unveiled at the 2001 Daytona Bike Week. In 2005, Suzuki re-branded it as the Suzuki Boulevard C50. It follows the formula of a smaller yet capable engine fitted into a frame sized for a slightly larger engine, a popular combination also in use by Honda, Kawasaki, and Yamaha in their respective cruiser lines.

== Overview ==
Most Boulevard C50 components were carried over from the Volusia line, and in 2005 the Boulevard series began using fuel injection instead of a carburetor. The engine is a liquid cooled 805 cc (49.1 cu in) in a 45° V-twin. It has 5-speed manual gearbox and a shaft drive. Overall, the C50 is 2,500 mm (98 in) long, with a 700 mm (28 in) seat height. It has a 16 L; 3.4 imp gal (4.1 US gal) fuel tank, front disc and rear drum brakes, and rider floorboards.

== Sub-models ==
There are four sub-models of the C50, starting with the base C50, which has wire wheels. The C50T adds a touring package consisting of a windshield, white wall tires, studded seats, studded passenger backrest, and studded saddlebags. The C50SE Special Edition has cast wheels and studded seats and a flowing or tribal flame paint job, depending on the model year. For 2014, Suzuki added the C50 B.O.S.S. (Blacked-Out Suzuki Special) edition, substituting black for nearly all of the standard chrome parts, and black cast wheels.
