= Suzuki TM =

Suzuki TM is a range of Motocross motorcycles manufactured by Suzuki. The TM ran from 1971 to 1975 and was replaced by the RM A Model in 1976. The RM model then went to an RM B in 1977, RM C in 1978 and RM N in 1979. The RM T came in 1980.

== History ==
Suzuki's first Motocross World Champion was Joel Robert in 1970, in the 250cc class. After this, Suzuki began producing a production motocrosser. The TM400R was manufactured for the 1971 season and they signed Roger DeCoster in October 1970 to race it. The TM series included the TM 75, TM 100, TM 125, TM 250, and TM 400. These early Suzuki mx bikes are now collectable vintage machines, as well as very competitive in the pre-1974 classic scramble races. DeCoster went on to win the 1971 500cc title and the World Championship four more times in 1972, 1973, 1975, 1976. Brad Lackey became America's first rider to win the 500cc World Motocross Championship on his works Suzuki in 1982.
