= Suzuki GR650 =

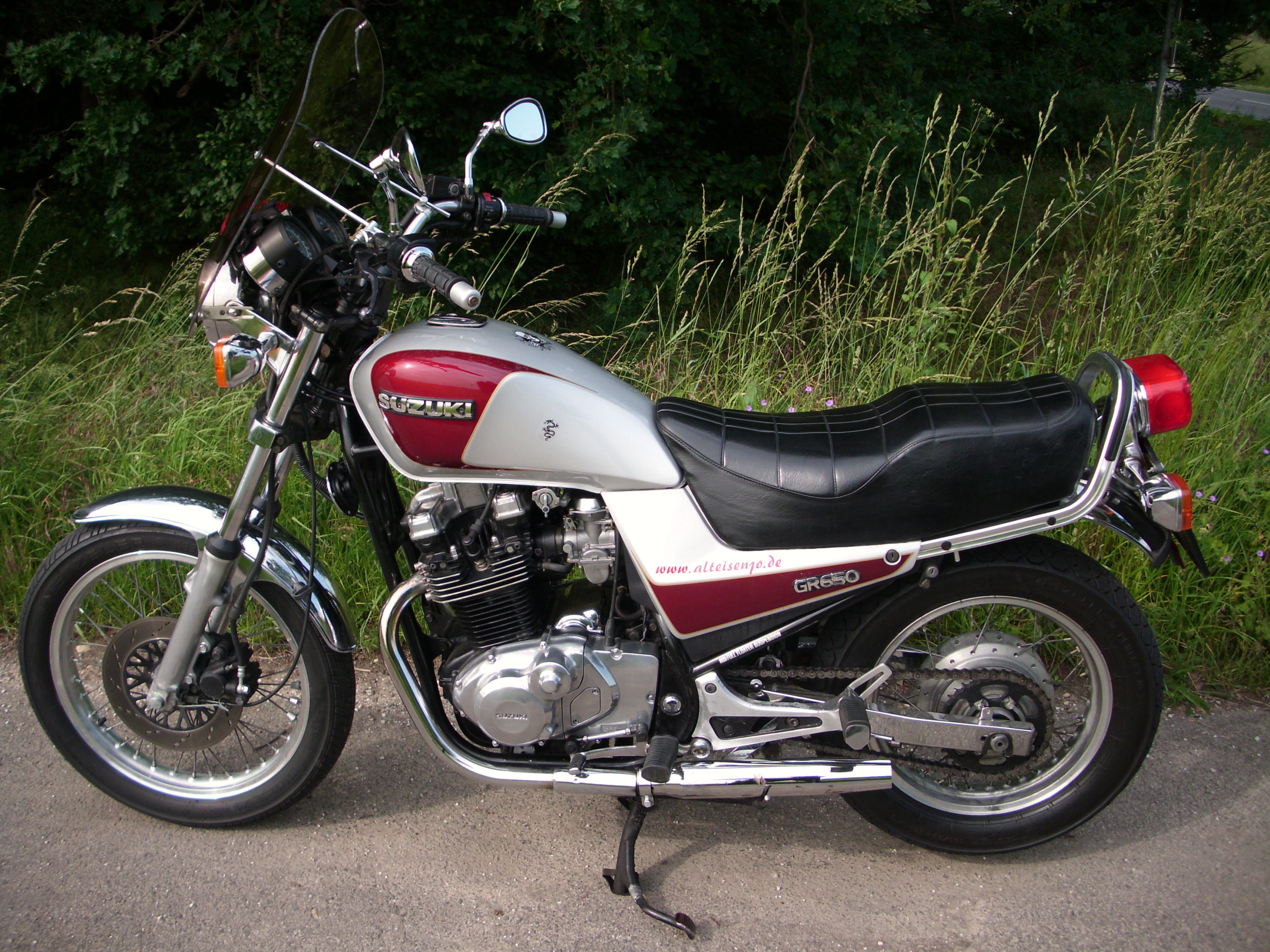
- Manufacturer: Suzuki
- Also called: Suzuki Tempter
- Production: 1983 - 1989
- Class: standard
- Engine: 651 cc (39.7 cu in) DOHC parallel twin
- Bore / stroke: 77 mm × 70 mm (3.0 in × 2.8 in)
- Compression ratio: 8.7:1
- Top speed: 177 km/h (110 mph)
- Power: 36.4 kW (48.8 hp) @ 7200 rpm
- Torque: 61 N⋅m (45 lbf⋅ft) @ 7200 rpm
- Ignition type: Battery-powered, inductive, magnetically triggered
- Fuel delivery: 2 x Mikuni CV BS36SS carburetors
- Transmission: 5-speed sequential manual transmission, chain drive
- Frame type: Double-downtube full cradle frame with a box-section steel swing arm
- Suspension: Front: 35 mm (1.4 in) air assisted forks Rear: Single shock, adjustable spring pre-load
- Brakes: Front: Single 260 mm (10 in) disc, 1 piston Rear: Drum
- Tires: Front: 100/90-19 57H IRC GS-16; Rear: 130/90-16 67H IRC GS-16
- Rake, trail: 27.5°, 110 mm (4.4 in)
- Wheelbase: 1,430 mm (56 in)
- Dimensions: L: 2,145 mm (84.4 in); W: 850 mm (33 in); H: 1,190 mm (47 in)
- Seat height: 775 mm (30.5 in)
- Weight: 181 kg (399 lb) (dry)
- Fuel capacity: 12 L (2.6 imp gal; 3.2 US gal)
- Fuel consumption: 4.9 L/100 km (58 mpg_{‑imp}; 48 mpg_{‑US})

The Suzuki GR650 is a two-cylinder standard motorcycle built by Suzuki from 1983 to 1989. In the United States it was called the GR650 Tempter, and was only sold there for the 1983 and 1984 model years. Suzuki would later use the `Tempter' name on a version of the ST400 sold in Japan and Europe.

== Features ==
The GR650 was powered by a four-stroke air-cooled DOHC parallel twin with two valves per cylinder (four valves total). This engine had a 180° crankshaft with a gear-driven counter-balancer and a wet sump. The carburetors were two Mikuni CV BS36SS. To induce swirl in the air-fuel mixture Suzuki added a sub-intake port connecting the carburetor throat to the intake port just above the valve head. Suzuki claimed that this allowed the GR650 to run with a leaner mixture than usual, which improved fuel economy. Two oil jets cooled the pistons at higher engine speeds.

The bike featured a two-stage flywheel which used a centrifugal clutch to disengage a secondary flywheel above 3,000 rpm, effectively lowering the mass of the flywheel. This was intended to dampen vibration and provide easier take-off at low RPM, and improve responsiveness at higher RPM.

The transmission was a five-speed fully meshed unit that drove the rear wheel through a 15/38 sprocket set and a #630 chain. Rear suspension was Suzuki's Full-Floater progressive mono-shock system.

At 178.5 kg (394 lb) dry and roughly 200 kg (440 lb) wet, the bike was lighter than most competitors with similar displacement, and it had a load capacity of 178 kg (393 lb).

== Models ==
The GR650 was sold in two levels of trim; the GR650D and the GR650X.

The GR650X came with wire spoke wheels, a monochromatic paint scheme, and non-adjustable front forks.

The GR650D had a two-tone paint scheme, cast alloy spoke wheels, an auxiliary running lamp under the headlamp and adjustable front air forks.

=== Military ===
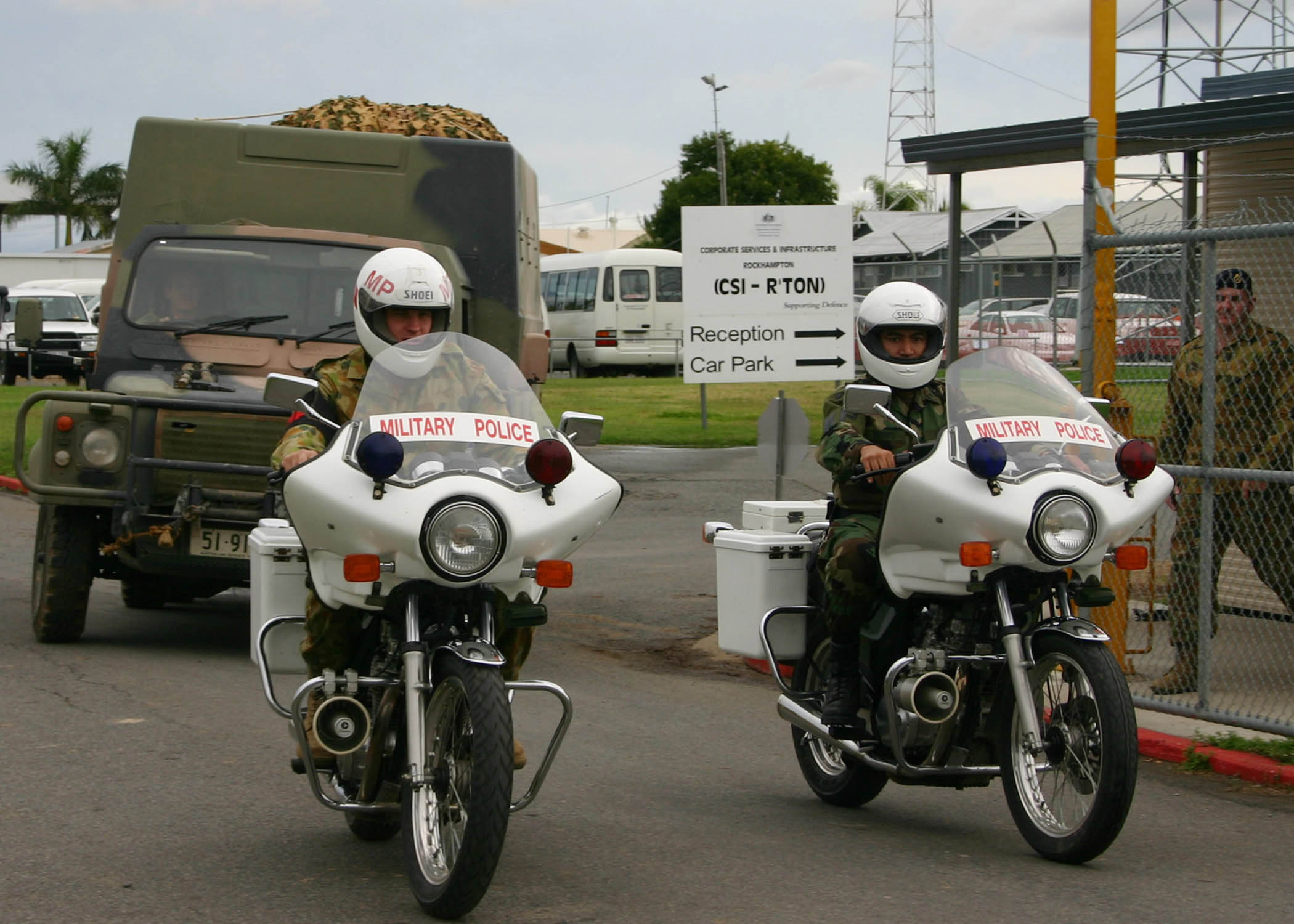
Suzuki GR650 Military Police in service

A modified version of the 1985 GR650D was used by the Australian Army. A modified version of the 1988 GR650X was used by the Australian Army military police.

== Reviews and riding impressions ==
Early reviews drew comparisons between the GR650 and classic British Twins, although some also saw a Cruiser influence. Suzuki's decision to release the bike into a shrinking market for parallel twins was also noted.

Reviewers commented on the bike's light weight (Suzuki called it 450 class) and compact engine package. These qualities, combined with a low center of gravity, produced handling described as "supple" and "easy" and the bike was called "tossable".

The engine's low-end torque was praised, although it was felt that peak power had been sacrificed. Cycle magazine recorded a 0-60 mph time of 5.7 seconds. Reviewers also wrote that at higher RPMs vibration from the engine became more pronounced. The 5-speed transmission was described as smooth and easy-shifting.

In Cycle World's long-term test they remarked on the bike's reliability. The only problems experienced after 14,000 miles was a leaking front shock oil reservoir and front pads that were worn down to metal at 7,400 miles..
