= Suzuki RG200 =

The Suzuki RG200 Gamma was produced in 1992 for the Japanese domestic market with a recommended retail price of 485,000 yen. It was available in only one colour variation; rouge red No.2. The notable points are its race replica styling and single-cylinder engine with an electric starter. It is similar to the better-known RG125 Gamma, though the larger engine capacity means it is able to be ridden on the tolled highways and freeways in Japan.

== Specifications ==
- Power: 34 PS (34 hp)
- Weight: 126 kg (278 lb)
- Fuel capacity: 14 L (3.7 US gal)

== See also ==
- List of Suzuki motorcycles
