= Suzuki Choinori =

Light motorcycle

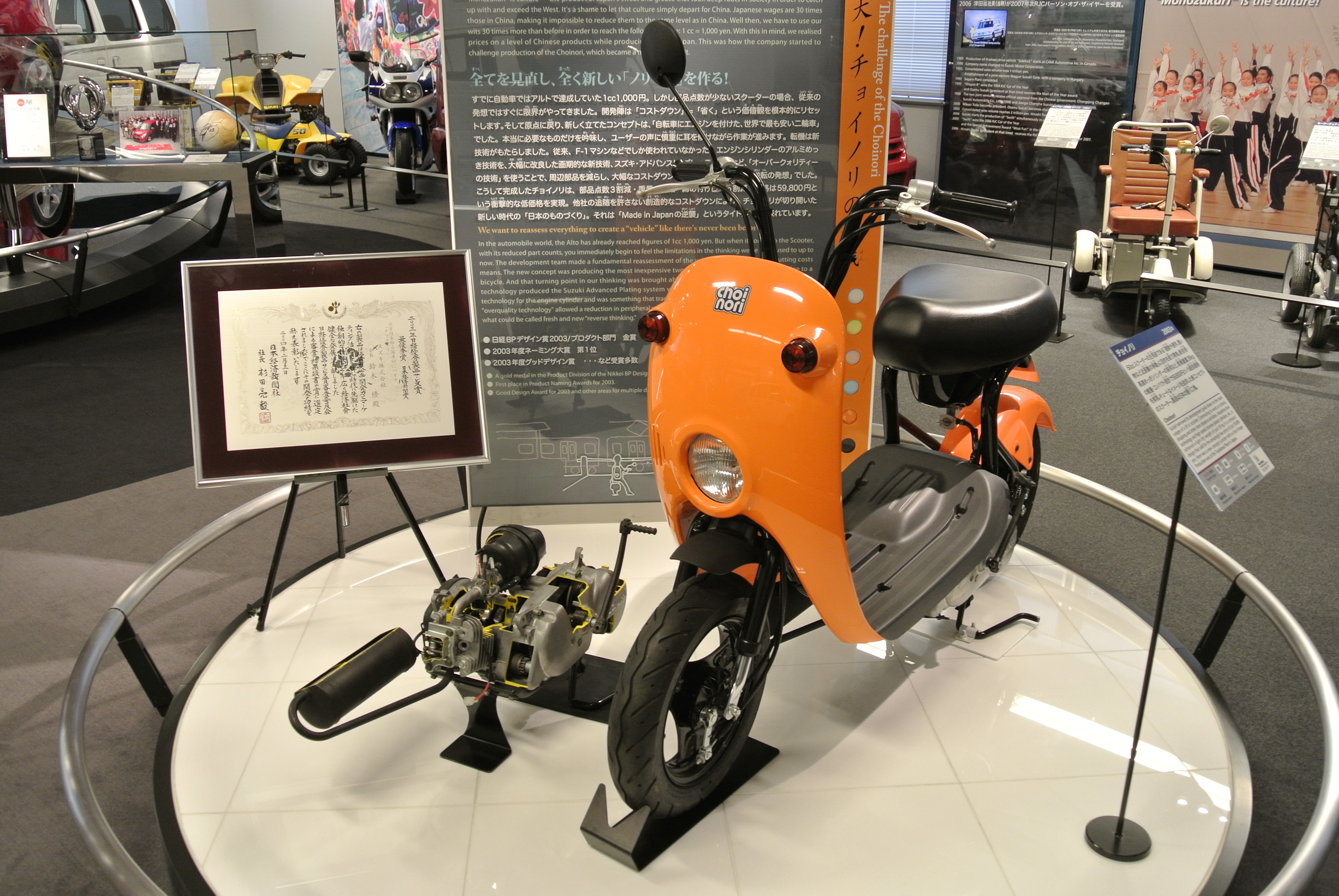
- Manufacturer: Suzuki
- Production: February 2003 – August 2007
- Assembly: Japan; Taiwan
- Class: Scooter/moped
- Engine: 49 cc (3.0 cu in) OHV single-cylinder
- Bore / stroke: 36.0 mm × 48.6 mm (1.42 in × 1.91 in)
- Power: 1.5 kW (2.0 hp) @ 5500 rpm
- Torque: 2.9 N⋅m (2.1 ft⋅lbf) @ 3500 rpm
- Ignition type: CDI
- Transmission: CVT
- Frame type: Tubular steel step-through
- Suspension: Front: Telescopic fork Rear: N/A
- Brakes: Front: Drum; Rear: Drum
- Tires: Front: 80/90–10 34J; Rear: 80/90–10 34J
- Rake, trail: 25°, 71 mm (2.8 in)
- Wheelbase: 1,055 mm (41.5 in)
- Dimensions: L: 1,500 mm (59 in); W: 620 mm (24 in); H: 975 mm (38.4 in)
- Weight: 39 kg (86 lb) (dry); 43 kg (95 lb) (wet)
- Fuel capacity: 3 L (0.79 U.S. gal; 0.66 imp gal)
- Fuel consumption: 76 km/L (179 mpg_{‑US}; 215 mpg_{‑imp})

The Suzuki Choinori was a scooter built by Suzuki from 2003 to 2007. It was designed to minimize the use of materials in general and plastics and threaded fasteners in particular in order to minimize cost. The Society of Automotive Engineers of Japan (in Japanese) named the Choinori as one of the 240 Landmarks of Japanese Automotive Technology.

== Concept and design ==
The Choinori was designed to be a short distance scooter for commuting and running errands. The name "choinori" is derived from "tohnori" the Japanese term for a long-distance touring motorcycle. "Toh nori" means "long ride", "choi nori" is the opposite, meaning "short ride", or "short hop".

The Choinori was designed to minimize the use of materials, especially plastic parts and nuts and bolts. A new 49 cc pushrod OHV engine was designed for the Choinori. The aluminium engine had a linerless bore that was plated by a newly developed high-speed plating process, reducing both cost and weight. Another feature to reduce cost and weight was the lack of a rear suspension, with the rear axle being bolted directly to the frame. The minimalist design allowed the Choinori to be sold at an extremely low price, with the basic version advertised at a lower price than Suzuki's contemporary electric bicycle.

== Developments and end of production ==
The Choinori engine was found to have a design problem with the cam followers, this was solved by redesigning the cam followers.^{[a]}

In 2004, the Choinori SS was introduced. Mechanically the same as the regular Choinori, the SS had the leg shield replaced by a headstock cover, a different style of handlebar was used, and the turn signals were moved to the handlebars.

Production of the Choinori was moved from Japan to Taiwan in 2005, and was discontinued in 2007 when the engine could not meet new emission standards.
