= Suzuki RG150 =

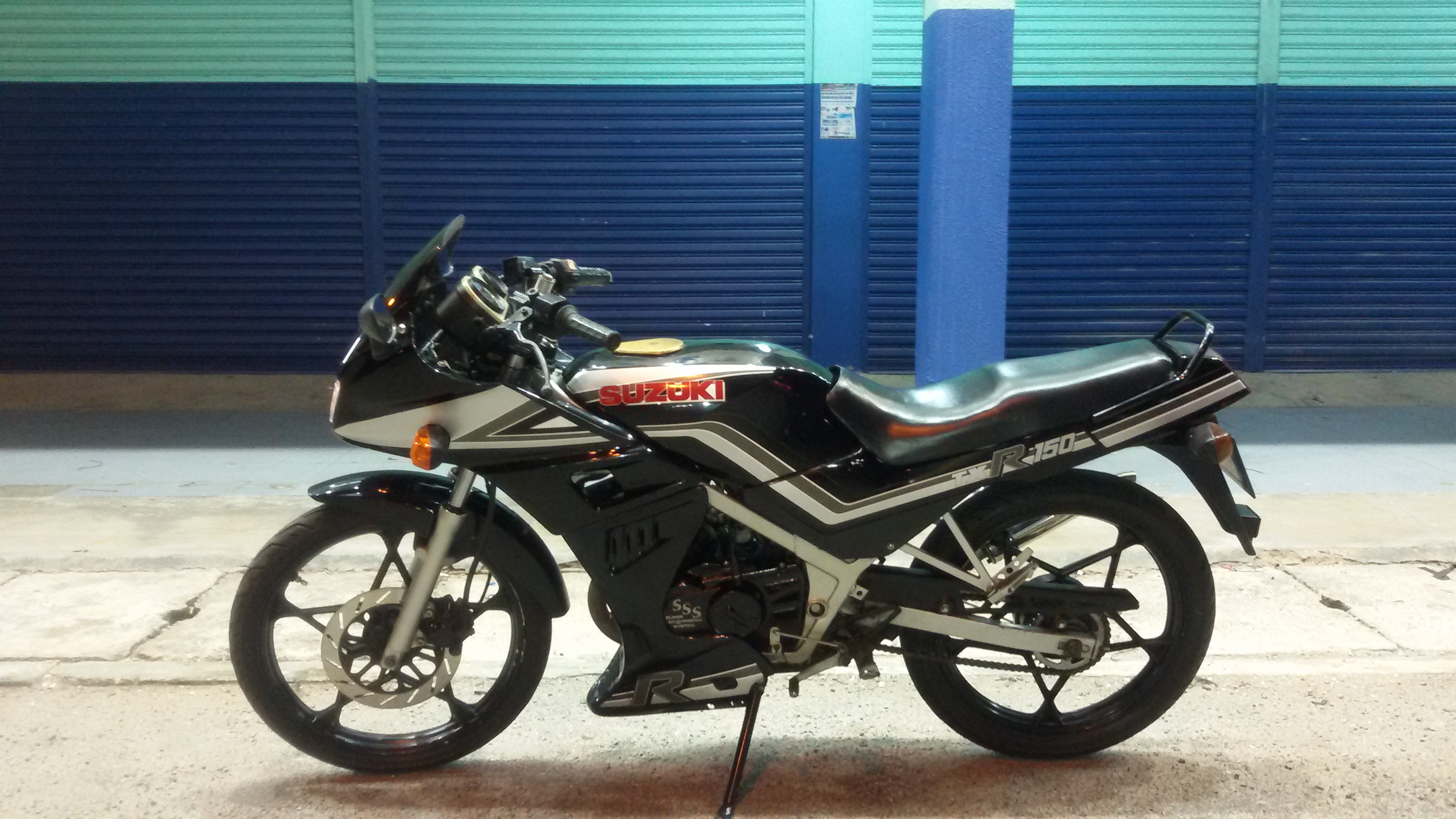
1992 RG150

The Suzuki RG 150 Gamma was a 148 cc two-stroke racing motorcycle produced by Suzuki mainly in Thailand from 1992 to 2000. In 1998, it was selected as the second-best new motorcycle of 1998 by Motor Trend magazine.

== Overview ==
The frame of the RG 150 Gamma was made of box-cut steel and had a banana-shaped rear swingarm. It had a single mono shock on the rear with a single disc brake. The front suspension was a traditional telescopic fork (that could be preloaded) also with a single disc brake and the wheels were tri-spoke Enkei mag-type wheels. The engine was a single-cylinder water-cooled two-stroke engine paired to a six-speed close ratio gearbox with a kick-start. The engine featured AETC (Automatic Exhaust Timing Control), basically a valve in the exhaust port of the engine. At low rpm it restricted the exhaust gases so the engine produced more torque; at high rpm (approx 7,800 rpm), it opened up to increase top end power. The exhaust also had an expansion chamber to give better top-end power. Maximum power was 37 HP/10,800 rpm at the engine crank, and top speed was limited 180 km/h (110 mph), (but able to be bypassed) due to the gearing allowing the motor to hit the rev limiter in top gear. These modified motorcycles have been known to exceed 200 km/h. At such point the gears hit their physical limitations. The bike featured a full fairing which was unusual for such a small bike.

== Specifications ==
Model	RG 150 Gamma
Capacity	148 cm^{3}
Bore x stroke (mm)	61 mm x 50.6 mm
Cylinders	Single-cylinder
Engine	Liquid-cooled, two-stroke, AETC (Automatic Exhaust Timing Control)
Power	37 HP (27.5 kW)/10,800 rpm
Weight	128 kg dry
Drive	Chain
Front tyre	90/90×17
Rear tyre	110/90×17

== Variations ==
Also available at the time the RG 150 Gamma was produced was the RGV 150, which was a cheaper version with an air-cooled engine, spoke wheels which only had a disc brake on the front and without powervalve AETC (Automatic Exhaust Timing Control). Suzuki FXR150 replaced the RG 150 Gamma and RGV 150. The design of the seat was modified slightly between the two RG150 models (RG150E and RG150ES), 'S' meaning the sport version. The picture above is an 'E' version of the bike.

The European market received the RG 125 which is almost identical to the RG 150 Gamma, but with a 123 cc engine of the same design as the RG 150 Gamma. The UK RG 125 also had indicators mounted on stalks and the front forks were upside down telescopic. RG 125 fun have a GSXR reversed front fork. as RGV 250 with only one brake disc (second brake disc can be mounted)

Interesting the RG 150 Gamma cylinder could also be fitted to a RGV 250 VJ22. This would give a displacement of 300cc.The fairing are almost the same as RGV 250.
