= Suzuki JR50 =

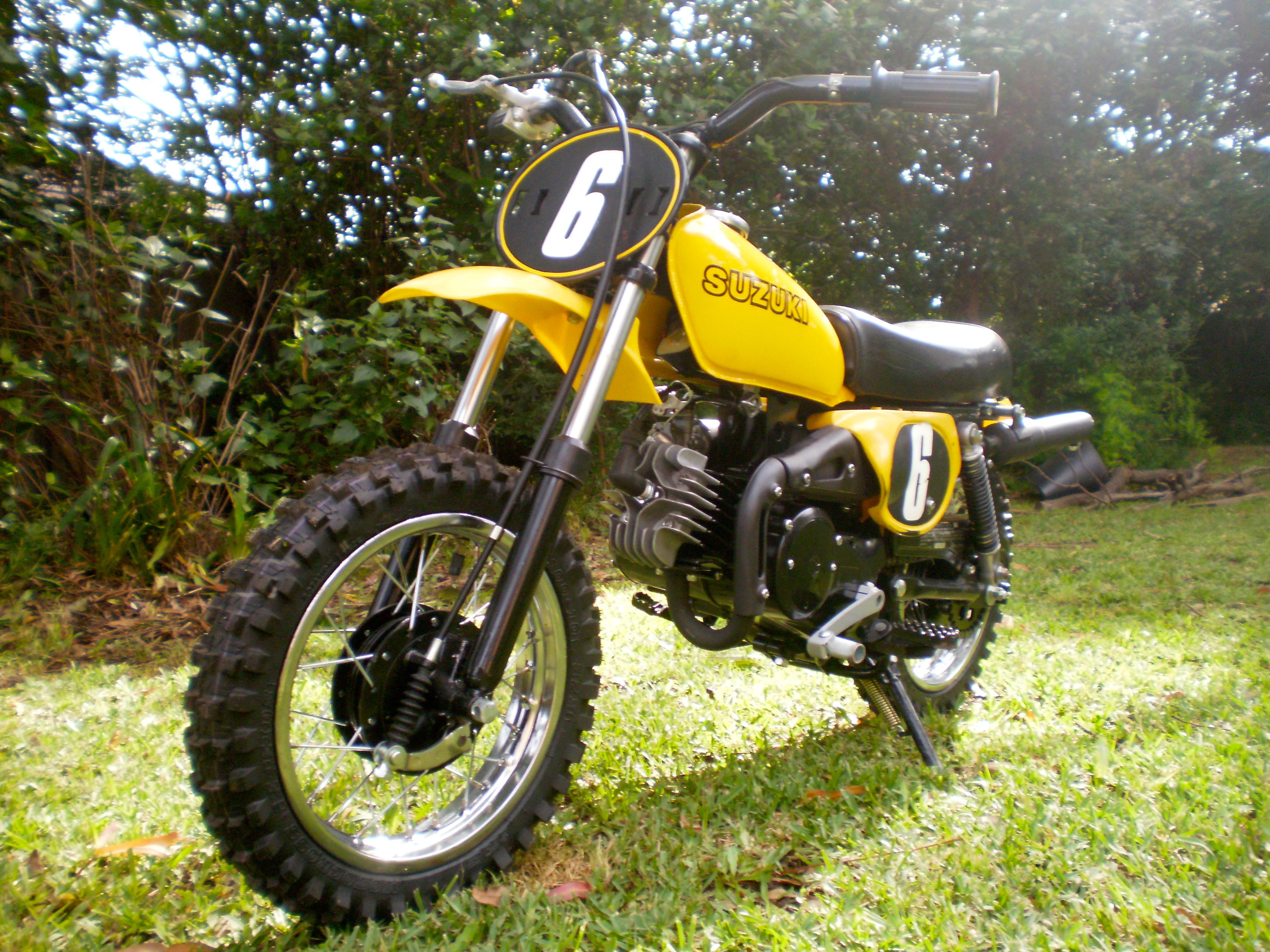
JR50C 1978

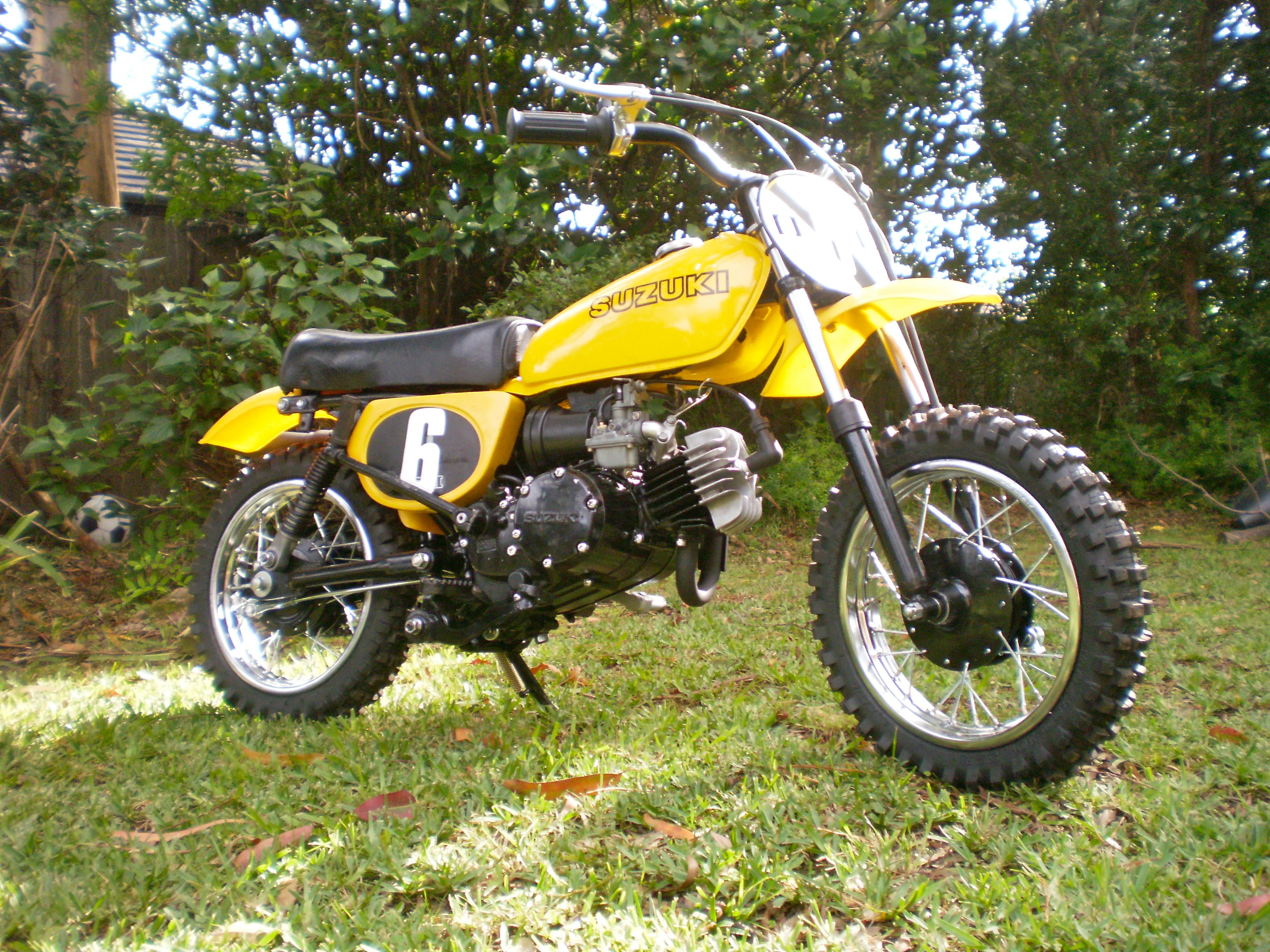
JR50C 1978

The Suzuki JR50 is a miniature motorcycle with a 49 cc (3.0 cu in) displacement and a single-speed automatic transmission, using a centrifugal clutch and height adjustable suspension. An oil injected two-stroke engine provides optimum lubrication and an oil level window makes it easy to see when a refill is needed. It is designed for children ages 5 to 12, and has been used for both racing and recreational riding. The JR50's engine was later used in the ALT50 and LT50 ATV's.
