= Suzuki TC90 =

Motorcycle

The Suzuki TC90 is a 90cc, 2-Stroke, oil injected motorcycle. The TC, as opposed to the TS, has a dual range transmission, 4 speeds low (dirt) and 4 speeds high (pavement).

The TC Suzuki series is closely related to the TS series.
