= Suzuki TC250 =

Suzuki TC250 may refer to:

- A scrambler version of the Suzuki T20 produced in 1967-68
- A scrambler version of the Suzuki T250 produced in 1970
