= Suzuki FM50 =

Entry-level scooter

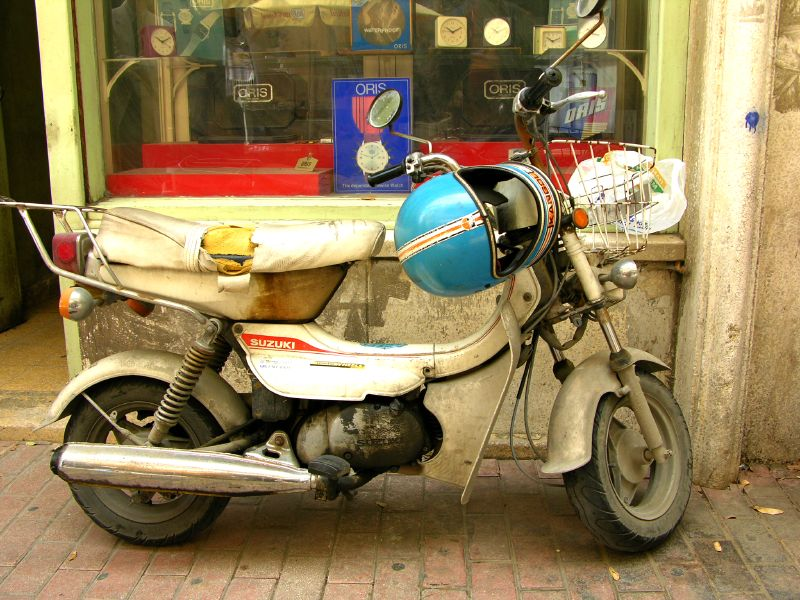
Suzuki FM50

The Suzuki FM50, also known as the Suzuki Landie (and sometimes spelt Landy) was an entry level scooter manufactured in the 1970s and 1980s by the Suzuki Motor Company. The powerplant was a two-stroke engine with a displacement of 49 cc (3.0 cu in) and regarded as a moped in many countries.
