= Suzuki RV125 =

Motorcycle series

The Suzuki RV125 is a motorcycle series manufactured by Suzuki from 1972 until 1982 and reintroduced as the RV125 VanVan in 2003.

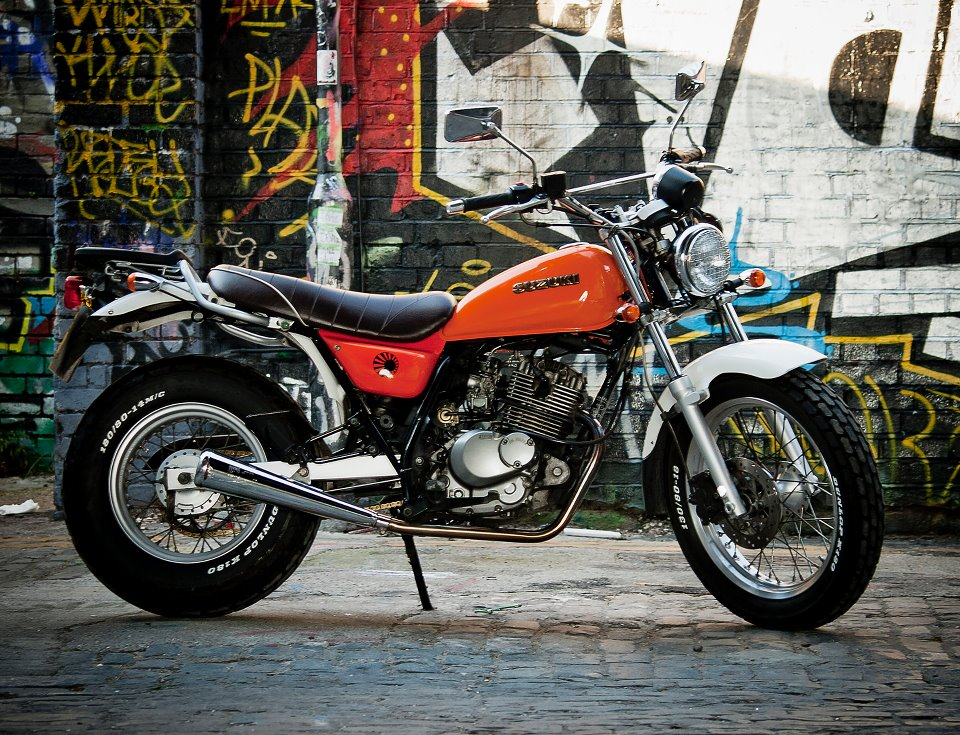
A custom VanVan

== 1972–1982 ==
The original Suzuki RV125 5-speed gearbox an air-cooled, 123 cc (7.5 cu in) single-cylinder 2-stroke engine. The RV range also includes 90 cc (5.5 cu in) and 50 cc (3.1 cu in) machines.

== 2003 onwards ==
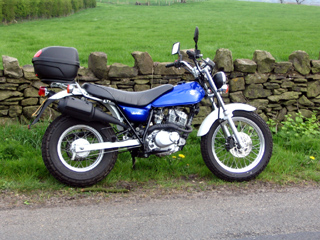
2005 Suzuki RV125 VanVan

The all-new RV125 VanVan has a four-stroke, air-cooled, single-cylinder, SOHC engine with 125 cc (7.6 cu in) displacement.

It has a six-speed gearbox and chain drive, balloon tyres, a dry mass of 117 kilograms (258 lb) and a seat height of 770 millimetres (30 in). The 'retro' styled VanVan is classed as a dual purpose bike, capable of cruising urban and suburban streets at 60 mph (97 km/h) or riding on sandy or rough trails. It is not designed for heavy mud trails.

From 2007 the VanVan comes with fuel injection instead of the carburetor featured on earlier models. It is often referred to as a 'sandbike', as its low-pressure wide-section tires helps grip and propel the bike across loose surfaces.

=== Dimensions and weights ===
- Overall length: 2,140 millimetres (84 in)
- Overall width: 860 millimetres (34 in)
- Overall height: 1,120 millimetres (44 in)
- Wheelbase: 1,385 millimetres (54.5 in)
- Seat height: 770 millimetres (30 in)
- Dry mass: 118 kilograms (260 lb)
- Fuel capacity: 6.5 litres (1.4 imp gal; 1.7 US gal)

=== Engine specifications ===
- Engine capacity: 125 cc
- Engine: Four-stroke, air-cooled, OHV
- Bore: 57 mm x 48.8 mm
- Compression ratio: 9.2 : 1
- Lubrication: Wet sump
- Ignition: Electronic ignition (transistorised)
- Starter: Electric
- Transmission: 6-speed constant mesh
- Drive: Chain

=== Chassis specification ===
- Front suspension: Telescopic, coil spring, oil damped
- Rear suspension: Swingarm type, coil spring, oil damped
- Front brakes: Disc brake
- Rear brakes: Drum brake
- Front tyres: 130/80-18 M/C 66P tube type
- Rear tyres: 180/80-14 M/C 78P tube type
