= Suzuki Sixteen =

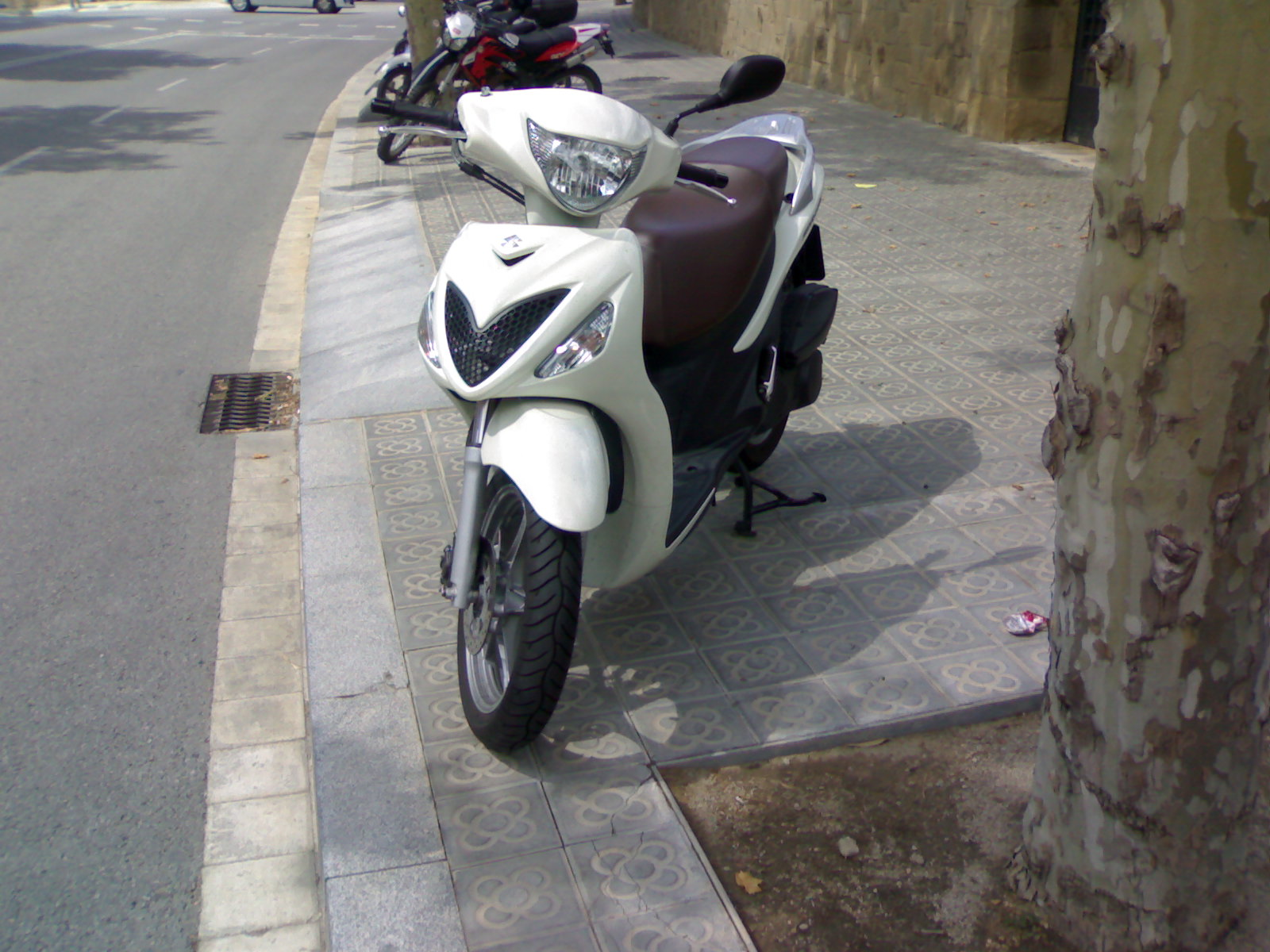
- Suzuki Sixteen scooter
- Manufacturer: Suzuki
- Production: 2008 - 2013
- Assembly: Gijón, Spain
- Class: Scooter
- Engine: 125 cc (7.6 cu in) - 150 cc (9.2 cu in), single
- Brakes: Both hydraulic disc brake
- Wheelbase: 1,385 mm (54.5 in)
- Dimensions: L: 2,060 mm (81 in); W: 740 mm (29 in)
- Seat height: 800 mm (31 in)
- Weight: 135 kg (298 lb) (dry)
- Fuel capacity: 8.5 L (1.9 imp gal; 2.2 US gal)

The Sixteen series of scooters are produced by Suzuki with 125 cc (7.6 cu in) up to 150 cc (9.2 cu in) versions. They were introduced in late 2007 and started shipping in 2008. Suzuki created this new series in order to compete with the well-known Honda SH series in the high-wheel scooter market. Suzuki introduced both models 125cc and 150 at the same time.
