= Suzuki Gixxer =

Suzuki Gixxer FI150
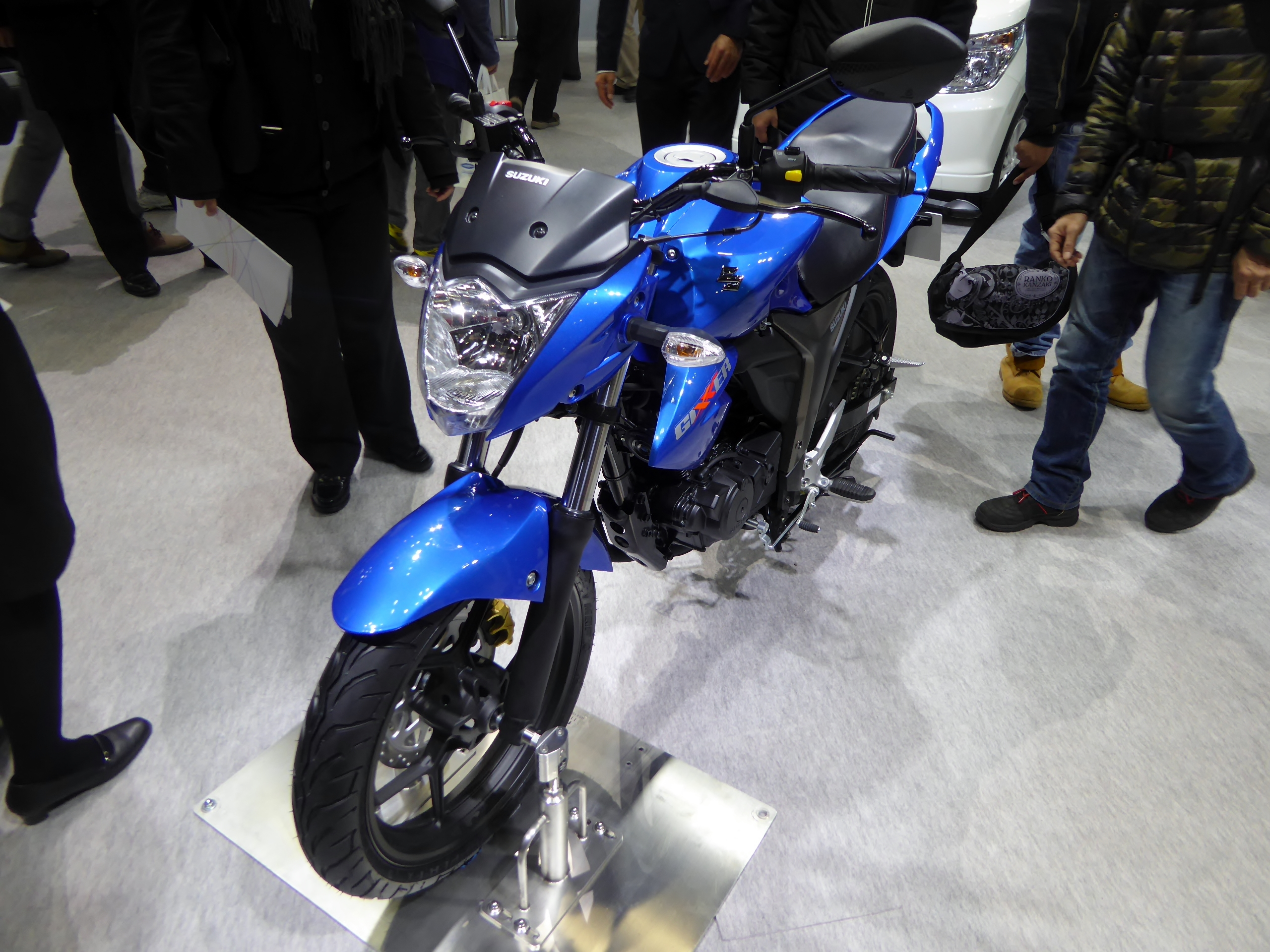
- Manufacturer: Suzuki
- Also called: Suzuki Gixxer FI150; Suzuki Gixxer SF150
- Parent company: Suzuki
- Production: 9 September 2014–present
- Predecessor: Suzuki Gixxer-150
- Class: Standard, Sports Bike
- Engine: 154.9 cc (9.45 cu in), four-stroke, air-cooled, SOHC single
- Bore / stroke: 56.0 mm × 62.9 mm (2.20 in × 2.48 in)
- Compression ratio: 9.8:1
- Top speed: 120 km/h (75 mph); 132 km/h (82 mph) (SF)
- Power: 13.6 PS (10.0 kW) at 8000 rpm
- Torque: 13.8 N⋅m (10.2 lbf⋅ft) at 6000 rpm
- Ignition type: CDI
- Transmission: 5-speed constant-mesh, manual, chain-drive
- Frame type: Diamond
- Suspension: Front: 41MM Telescopic Suspension, Rear: Swing arm, 7-step adjustable Mono suspension
- Brakes: Front: Hydraulic 266 mm single disc, Rear: Drum & 240 mm Disk
- Tires: Front: 100/80-17; Rear: 140/60R-17
- Wheelbase: 1,330 mm (52 in)
- Dimensions: L: 2,050 mm (81 in); W: 785 mm (30.9 in); H: 1,030 mm (41 in)
- Seat height: 780 mm (31 in)
- Weight: 135 kg (298 lb); SF: 139 kg (306 lb); (wet)
- Fuel capacity: 12 L (2.6 imp gal; 3.2 US gal) including reserve 2.4 L
- Oil capacity: 850 mL (950 mL if oil filter is replaced)
- Related: Suzuki Gixxer 250 Suzuki Gixxer SF250

The Suzuki Gixxer FI 150 is a 154.9 cc (9.45 cu in) naked motorcycle from Suzuki. The bike was launched in September 2014. The name derives from a nickname used in Britain and elsewhere for the GSX-R.

== Faired version ==
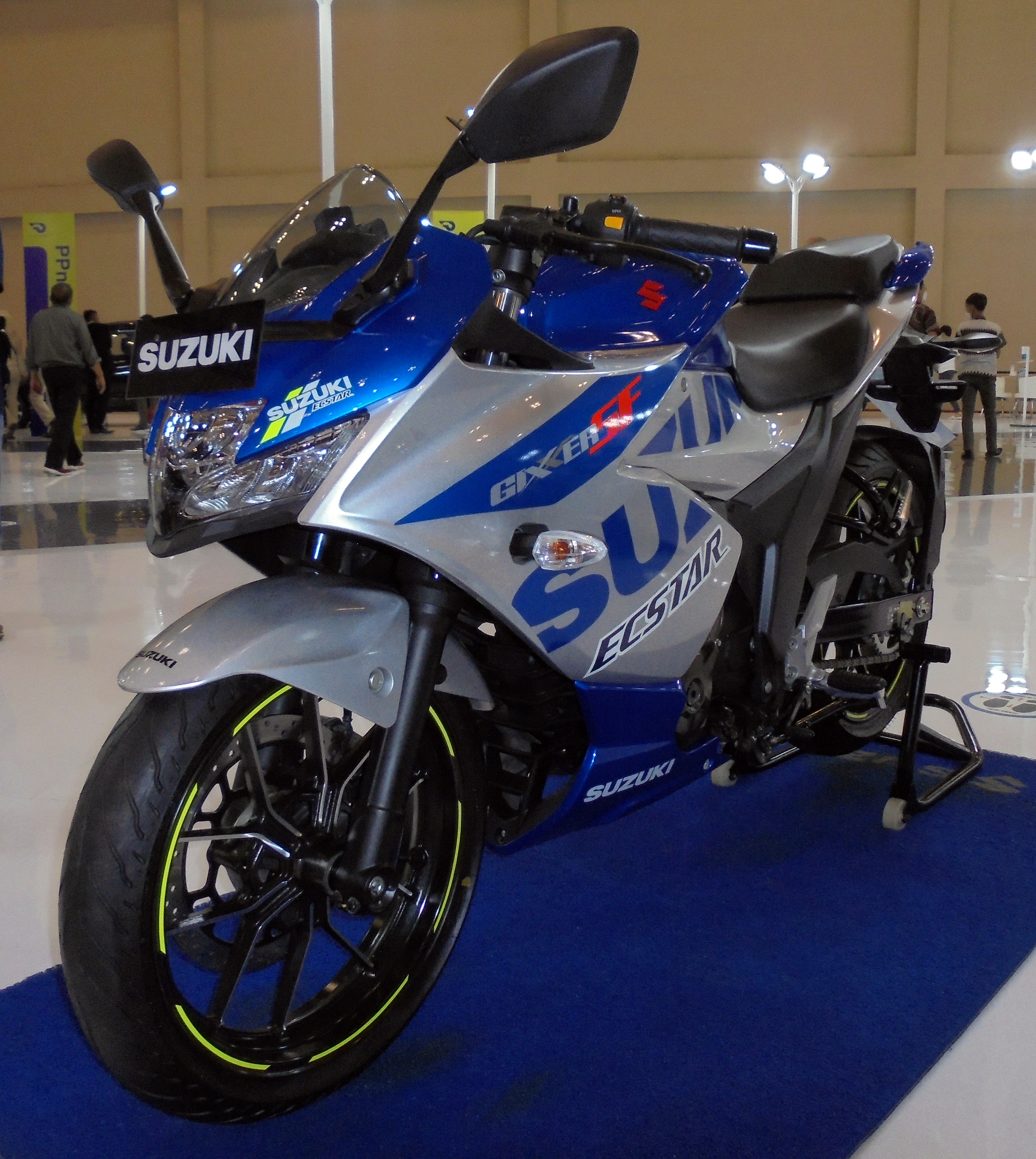
Suzuki Gixxer SF

The Suzuki Gixxer SF, a faired version of the Gixxer was launched on 7 April 2015. SF stands for Sport Fairing. The fully faired version is 4 kg heavier than the naked version; the other specifications remain the same. With its aerodynamic fairing, the faired version is faster by about 10 km/h and reaches a top speed of about 130 km/h. The Gixxer SF's design is inspired by the Suzuki GSX-R series, and the Suzuki Hayabusa. The MotoGP edition also comes with fuel injection.

== Special edition ==
Suzuki has launched special editions of both the naked and faired versions with cosmetic changes; including a version in Matte gray and Black body colour combination with a racing flag theme inspired by MotoGP. Suzuki launched another Special Edition colour scheme in 2017 with combination of Orange, White and Black colours.

== Updates ==
- 8 September 2016 - Fuel Injection variant launched.
- 17 February 2017 - Updated with AHO as standard.
- 11 August 2017 - ABS is added.

== 2020 facelift ==
Suzuki upgraded the Gixxer and SF models in 2020. The facelift model has a brand new fairing, a new digital instrument cluster and a BS6 compliant engine. It also gets new LED headlamps and taillamps. New graphics and color schemes distinguish the new edition from the older model. The chassis has also been revised, and it is now 3 mm thicker. The SF version also gets new clip-on handlebars which make the riding stance more aggressive than before. The Fuel tank capacity though remains the same. The new bike makes 13.4BHP (13.6PS) and 13.8Nm as opposed to 13.9BHP and 14Nm on older version.
