= Suzuki RG50 =

The Suzuki RG50 motorcycle was produced in different versions from the late '70s, one of them - the RG50 Gamma - being a sport variant. Both were powered by a two-stroke, single-cylinder engine of 49 cubic centimeters swept volume; the Gamma model, in production from at least 1986 through 1990, differed in many respects, notably with better suspension, being water-cooled, having a racing exhaust, and rated over seven horsepower. Equipped with a small fairing and with power typically ~7.2ps, this model became popular in certain racing formats. RG50 types had a six-speed transmission. The non-Gamma variant had maximum speed on level pavement with no headwind of 60 km/hour in 4th gear at 6000 rpm in countries where the horsepower was restricted by law. In contrast, the Gamma variant would reliably reach motorway speeds, up to 120kph. Fuel usage at full speed is average, at around 40mpg +/- 30%. The non-Gamma engine redlines at 5500 rpm, and engine torque below 5000 rpm is quite feeble. Similarly the Gamma tach redline begins at 11,000 rpm and little torque is present below 7,000 rpm. A first gear with higher-than-average speed ratio, combined with weak low-speed torque, makes it a fairly difficult bike to start from standstill. This was less true of the Gamma variant which even at low engine speeds produced sufficient starting torque.

The motorcycle's dry weight varied between model years; typically around 62 kg, but cf. the 1995 Gamma variant at 73kg (a stronger chassis and water cooling being partly responsible) versus the 1982 Gamma at 69kg.

In some countries, such as New Zealand, the RG50 was a popular bike choice for bucket racing, being light and easy to tune. The Gamma variant needed less preparation being already essentially in racing tune.
