= Suzuki DR350 =

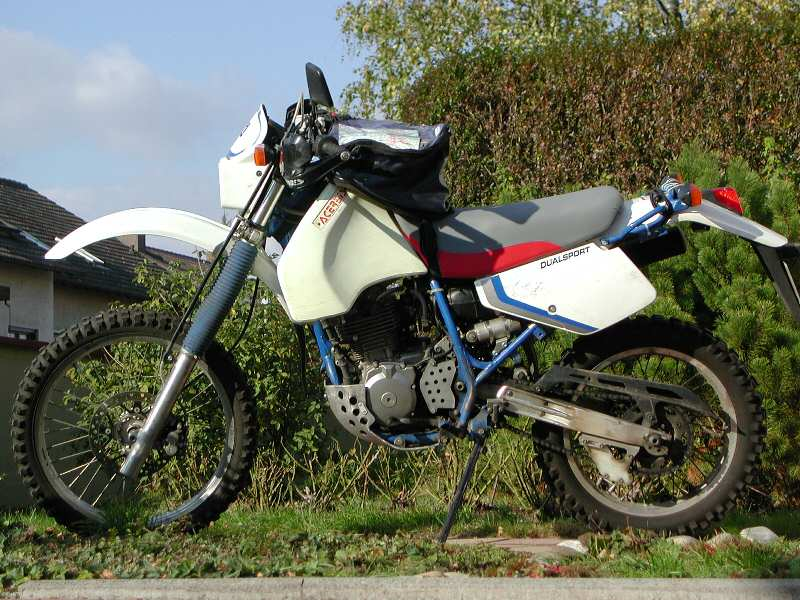
- Manufacturer: Suzuki
- Production: 1990–2001
- Successor: DR-Z400
- Class: Dual-sport
- Engine: 349 cc (21.3 cu in) 4-stroke, air/oil cooled, single
- Bore / stroke: 79.0 mm × 71.2 mm (3.11 in × 2.80 in)
- Top speed: 87 mph (140 km/h)
- Power: 33.4 hp (24.9 kW)
- Torque: 25.6 lb⋅ft (34.7 N⋅m)
- Ignition type: CDI ignition
- Transmission: 6-speed constant mesh, manual, chain-drive
- Frame type: Diamond steel
- Brakes: Disc
- Rake, trail: 118mm
- Wheelbase: 1,440 mm (57 in)
- Dimensions: W: 885 mm (34.8 in); H: 1,250 mm (49 in)
- Seat height: 920 mm (36 in)
- Weight: 130 kg (290 lb) (wet)
- Fuel capacity: 9 L (2.0 imp gal; 2.4 US gal)
- Oil capacity: 2.1 L (0.46 imp gal; 0.55 US gal)
- Fuel consumption: 17 km/L (48 mpg_{‑imp}; 40 mpg_{‑US})
- Range: 145 kilometres (90 mi)

The Suzuki DR350 was a 350 cc single cylinder 4-stroke motorcycle produced in both off-road only and dual-sport versions. They were introduced in 1990 and produced until 2001. The DR350S and DR350 were kick start motorcycles until 1994 when the DR350SE was introduced adding an electric start. The engine is an air-cooled 349 cc (21.3 cu in) single cylinder overhead cam (OHC) 4V (four valves per cylinder), with the Suzuki Advanced Cooling System (SACS), dry sump lubrication, 6-speed manual transmission, 21-inch front wheel and 18-inch rear wheel. The brake disc at the front wheel is a single 220 mm disc and at the rear wheel is a 200 mm brake disc.

The motorcycle has an acceleration speed of 1/4 mile (400 m) in 15.1 seconds and a top speed of 140 km/h (87 mph).
