= Suzuki B-King =

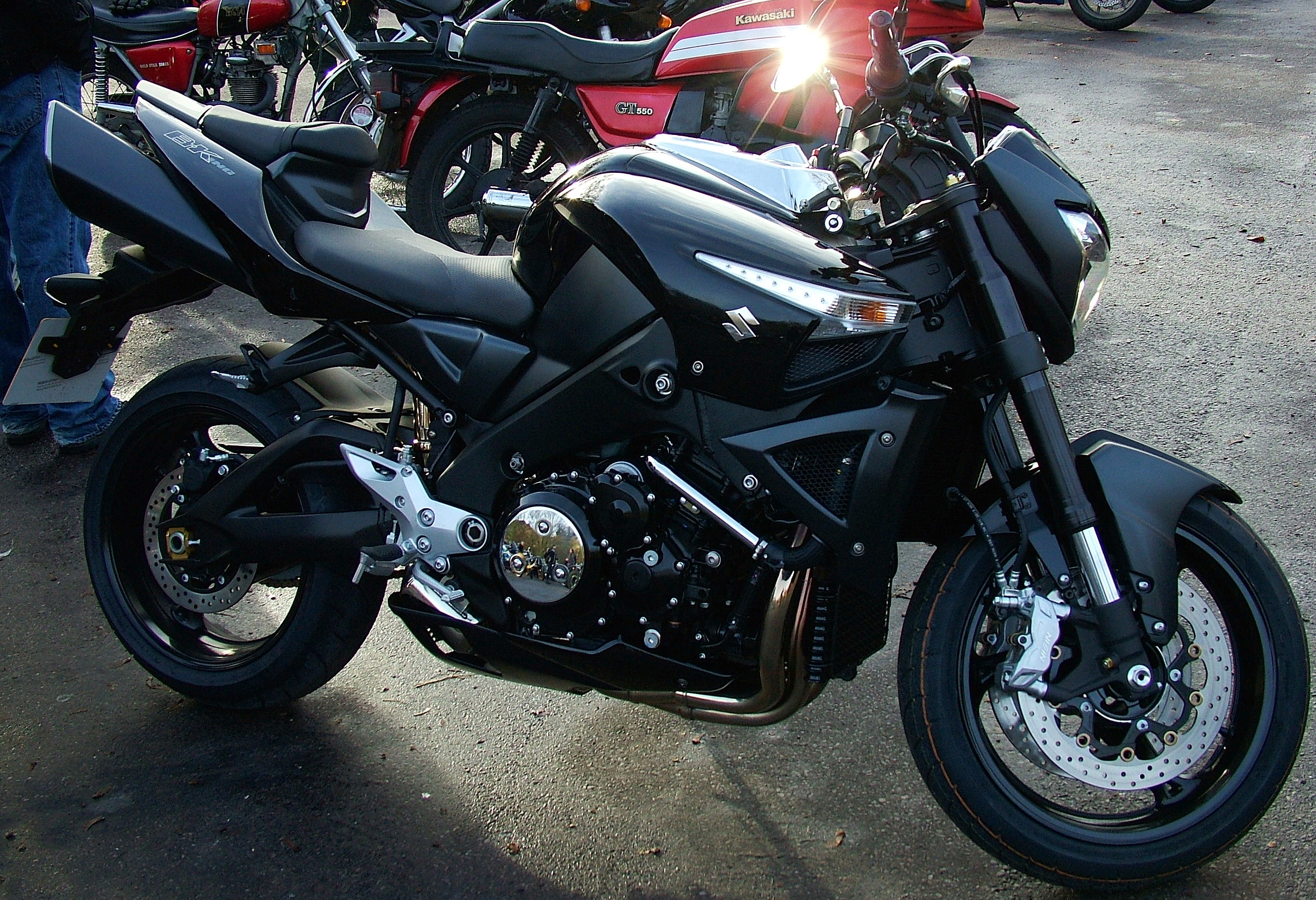
- Manufacturer: Suzuki
- Production: 2007–2012
- Class: Streetfighter
- Engine: 1,340 cc (82 cu in)
- Bore / stroke: 81.0 mm × 65.0 mm (3.19 in × 2.56 in)
- Top speed: 158 mph (254 km/h)
- Power: 181 hp (135 kW) at 9500 rpm 163.9 hp (122 kW) (rear wheel)
- Torque: 108 lbf⋅ft (146 N⋅m) at 7200 rpm 97.2 lbf⋅ft (131.8 N⋅m) (rear wheel)
- Transmission: 6-speed, chain-drive
- Brakes: front 310 mm, 4-piston radial mount caliper rear 260 mm, 1-piston caliper
- Tires: front 120/70ZR17 rear 200/50ZR17
- Wheelbase: 1,525 mm (60.0 in)
- Dimensions: L: 2,220 mm (87 in); W: 800 mm (31 in); H: 1,085 mm (42.7 in)
- Seat height: 805 mm (31.7 in)
- Weight: 518 lb (235 kg) (dry); 578 lb (262 kg) (wet)
- Fuel capacity: 16.5 litres (3.6 imp gal; 4.4 US gal)
- Oil capacity: 4 litres (4.2 US qt)
- Related: Suzuki Hayabusa

The Suzuki B-King is a streetfighter style motorcycle manufactured by Suzuki, that was unveiled in 2007. It uses the same 1,340 cc (82 cu in) engine that is fitted to the second generation 2008–2020 Hayabusa, but with different exhaust and intake systems.

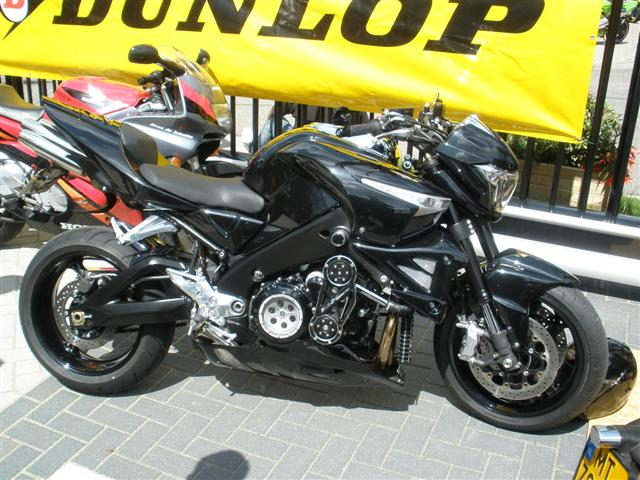
Suzuki B-King

The B-King was originally revealed in 2000 as a concept show bike powered by a supercharged Hayabusa engine.
