= Suzuki Boulevard S50 =

- Manufacturer: Suzuki Motor Corporation
- Class: Cruiser
- Engine: 50 cubic inch, four-stroke, liquid cooled, 45 degree V-twin, SOHC, 8-valves, TSCC
- Bore / stroke: 83.0 x 74.4 mm
- Compression ratio: 10.0:1
- Ignition type: Digital/transistorized
- Transmission: 5-speed, shaft drive
- Suspension: Front: Telescopic, coil spring, oil damped Rear: Swingarm, oil damped, 5-way adjustable spring preload
- Brakes: Front: Single hydraulic disc Rear: Single drum
- Tires: Front: 100/90-19 57H; Rear: 140/90-15 M/C-70H
- Wheelbase: 1560 mm (61.4 in.)
- Dimensions: L: 2250 mm (88.6 in.); W: 765 mm (30.1 in.); H: 1125 mm (44.3 in.)
- Seat height: 700 mm (27.6 in.)
- Weight: 201 kg (443 lb.); CA model: 202 kg (445 lb) (dry)
- Fuel capacity: 12 L (2.6 imp gal; 3.2 US gal); CA model: 11 L (2.4 imp gal; 2.9 US gal)

The Suzuki Boulevard S50 is a motorcycle manufactured by Suzuki and released in 2005 and production stopped in 2009. It features an 805 cc v-twin engine with four valves per cylinder. It was formerly named the Intruder 1985 - 1991 VS 700 (USA), 1985 VS 750 (worldwide) and VS 800 (1992 - 2004).

== Specification ==
The Boulevard S50's engine is carbureted by a Mikuni BDS36 in the front, and a Mikuni BS36 in the rear, and features wet sump lubrication. It has a ground clearance of 125 mm (4.9 in), and comes in many colours depending upon the model year & country of sale.

ENGINE & DRIVETRAIN

liquid-cooled 45-degree tandem V-twin

SOHC; 2 intake, 2 exhaust valves; operated by rockers, threaded adjusters

Displacement, bore x stroke: 805cc, 83 x 74.4mm

Compression ratio: 10.0:1

Carburetion: 2, 36mm Mikuni CV

Lubrication: wet sump, 3.5 qt., spin-on filter

Minimum fuel grade: 87 octane

Transmission: wet multiplate clutch; 5 speeds

Final drive: shaft, 3.2:1

CHASSIS

Wet weight: 477 lb., 52% rear wheel

GVWR: 950 lb.

Wheelbase: 61.4 in.

Overall length: 88.8 in.

Rake/trail: 33.25 degrees / 5.71 in.

Seat height: 27.6 in.

** wire-spoke; 21 x 2.15 front, 15 x 3.00 rear** 1989 -1999

**Front tire: 80/90-21 tube-type** 1989 -1999

Front tire: 100/90/19 tube-type 1985 - 1988 & 2000 - 2009

Rear tire: 140/90-15 tube-type

Front brake: double-action caliper, 11.6-in. disc

Rear brake: drum, rod-operated

Front suspension: 39mm stanchions, 5.1 in, travel

Rear suspension: dual dampers, 3.5 in. travel, adjustment for preload

Fuel capacity: 3.2 gal., Calif. 2.9 gal. (.8 gal reserve)

Inseam equivalent: 31.5 in.

ELECTRICAL & INSTRUMENTATION

Charging output: 252 watts

Battery: 12v, 16AH

Lighting: 55/60-watt 5.7-in. headlight, position lights

Taillight: 1 bulb

Speedometer, odometer, tripmeter;

Warning lights: neutral, high beam, coolant temperature, oil pressure

PERFORMANCE

Fuel mileage: 37 to 50 mpg, 44.6 mpg average

Average range: 143 miles

RPM at 60 mph, top gear: 4080

200 yard, top-gear acceleration from 50 mph, terminal speed: 84.8 mph

Quarter-mile acceleration: 13.31 sec., 97.3 mph
