= Suzuki DR200SE =

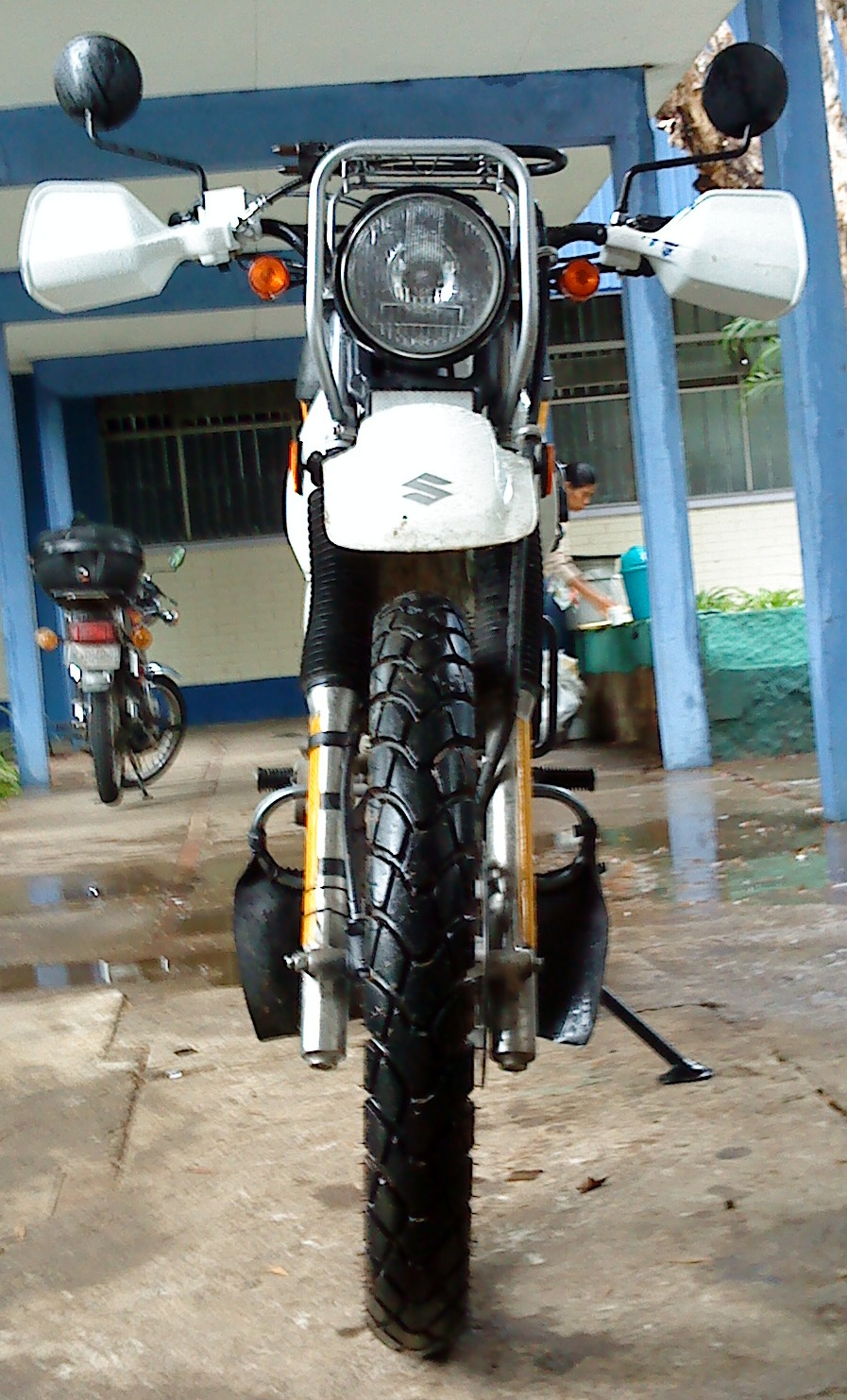
- Manufacturer: Suzuki
- Also called: Suzuki Trojan
- Engine: 199 cc (12.1 cu in), four-stroke, SOHC, single, Mikuni BST31 carburetor, Squish Dome Combustion Chamber (SDCC).
- Bore / stroke: 66.0 mm × 58.2 mm (2.60 in × 2.29 in)
- Compression ratio: 9.4:1
- Power: 20 hp (15 kW) @ 8500 rpm
- Torque: 13.3 lb⋅ft (18.0 N⋅m) @ 7000 rpm
- Transmission: 5-speed, #520 chain
- Suspension: Front: telescopic fork, oil damped (205 mm or 8.1 in); Rear: oil damped, adjustable preload (205 mm or 8.1 in)
- Brakes: Front: hydraulic disc (230 mm or 9.1 in); Rear: mechanical drum (130 mm or 5.1 in)
- Tires: Front: 70/100-21 44P; rear: 100/90-18 56P
- Wheelbase: 1,405 mm (55.3 in)
- Dimensions: L: 2,150 mm (85 in); W: 805 mm (31.7 in); H: 1,185 mm (46.7 in)
- Seat height: 810 mm (32 in)
- Weight: 249 lb (113 kg) (dry); 276 lb (125 kg) (wet)
- Fuel capacity: 13.0 L (2.9 imp gal; 3.4 US gal), 12.5 L (2.7 imp gal; 3.3 US gal), California-specific model.
- Ground clearance: 260 mm (10 in)

The Suzuki DR200SE is an entry-level dual-sport motorcycle built by Suzuki.

Introduced in 1996 the DR200SE was a derivative of the DR200 and has remained mostly unchanged until production stopped in 2013 with the introduction of the DR200S which is essentially the same bike mechanically with a few minor upgrades to the seat and the plastics. This lightweight, low-cost motorcycle is often used by the Motorcycle Safety Foundation to teach beginners how to ride. It has a four-stroke, 199 cc (12.1 cu in) single-cylinder engine and can be ridden offroad or licensed for street use in the United States. It has a five-speed transmission and push-button start with electronic-ignition. Some models outside the United States have a kickstart, handguard, left and right side stand, oil radiator, front luggage carrier-headlight guard and rear luggage carrier.

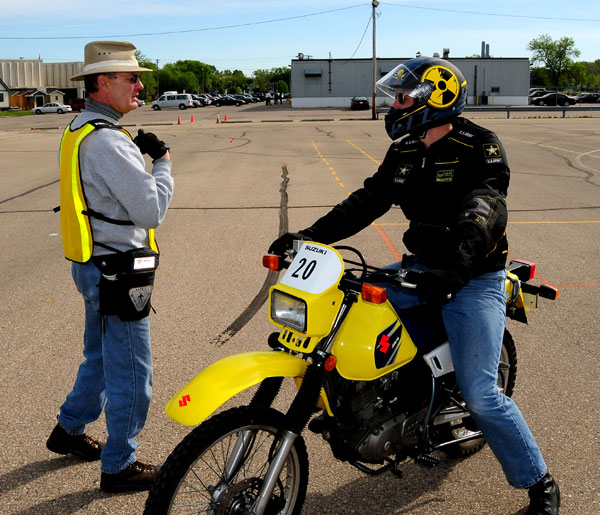
A motorcyclist receives coaching from an instructor in a Motorcycle Safety Foundation basic rider's course (BRC).
