= Suzuki Boulevard S83 =

2005 motorcycle

The Suzuki Boulevard S83 is a motorcycle manufactured by Suzuki and renamed in 2005 from Intruder 1400 to S83 to indicate the 83 cubic inches of the engine. It features a 1360 cc v-twin engine. It was formerly named the Intruder VS1400 and was introduced in 1987. In 1998, the Intruder 1400 went from a 4-speed transmission to a 5-speed transmission, and that carried over through the S83 years (2005 - 2009) Like the Intruder, the S83 retained the model designation VS1400. The 1360cc V-twin engine produced 72 horsepower at 4,800 rpm and 85 lb-ft (115 Nm) of torque at 5,000 rpm. Both of those numbers are quite impressive in comparison to similar sized bikes of the time. Like the Intruder before it, the S83 had dual carbs that were connected by a sync rod. in 2005, the two colors available were black or gray. in 2006, the two colors available were black or gray. in 2007, the two colors available were black or Dark Blue. in 2008, the two colors available were black or gold. in 2009, the two colors available were black or gray. The final year of production for the S83 was in 2009.

== Specification ==
	Suzuki Boulevard S83, 2005–2009
Engine	83 cubic inches (1360 cc), four-stroke, air/oil cooled, 45 degree V-twin, SOHC, 6-valves, 72HP
Bore Stroke	94.0 x 98.0 mm
Compression Ratio	9.3:1
Fuel System	Front: Mikuni BDS36 Rear: Mikuni BS36
Lubrication	Wet Sump
Ignition	Digital/transistorized
Transmission	5-speed
Final Drive	Shaft Drive
Overall Length	2335 mm (91.9 in.)
Overall Width	765 mm (30.1 in.)
Overall Height	1145 mm (45.1 in.)
Seat Height	740 mm (29.1 in.)
Ground Clearance	150 mm (5.9 in.)
Wheelbase	1620 mm (63.5 in.)
Dry Weight	243 kg (535 lb.) 244 kg (537 lb.) CA model
Suspension Front	Telescopic, coil spring, oil damped
Suspension Rear	Swingarm, oil damped, 5-way adjustable spring preload
Brakes Front	Single hydraulic disc
Brakes Rear	Single hydraulic disc
Tires Front	110/90-19 62H
Tires Rear	170/80-15 M/C 77H
Fuel Tank Capacity	13 liter (3.5 gal.)
