= Suzuki GSX250F Across =

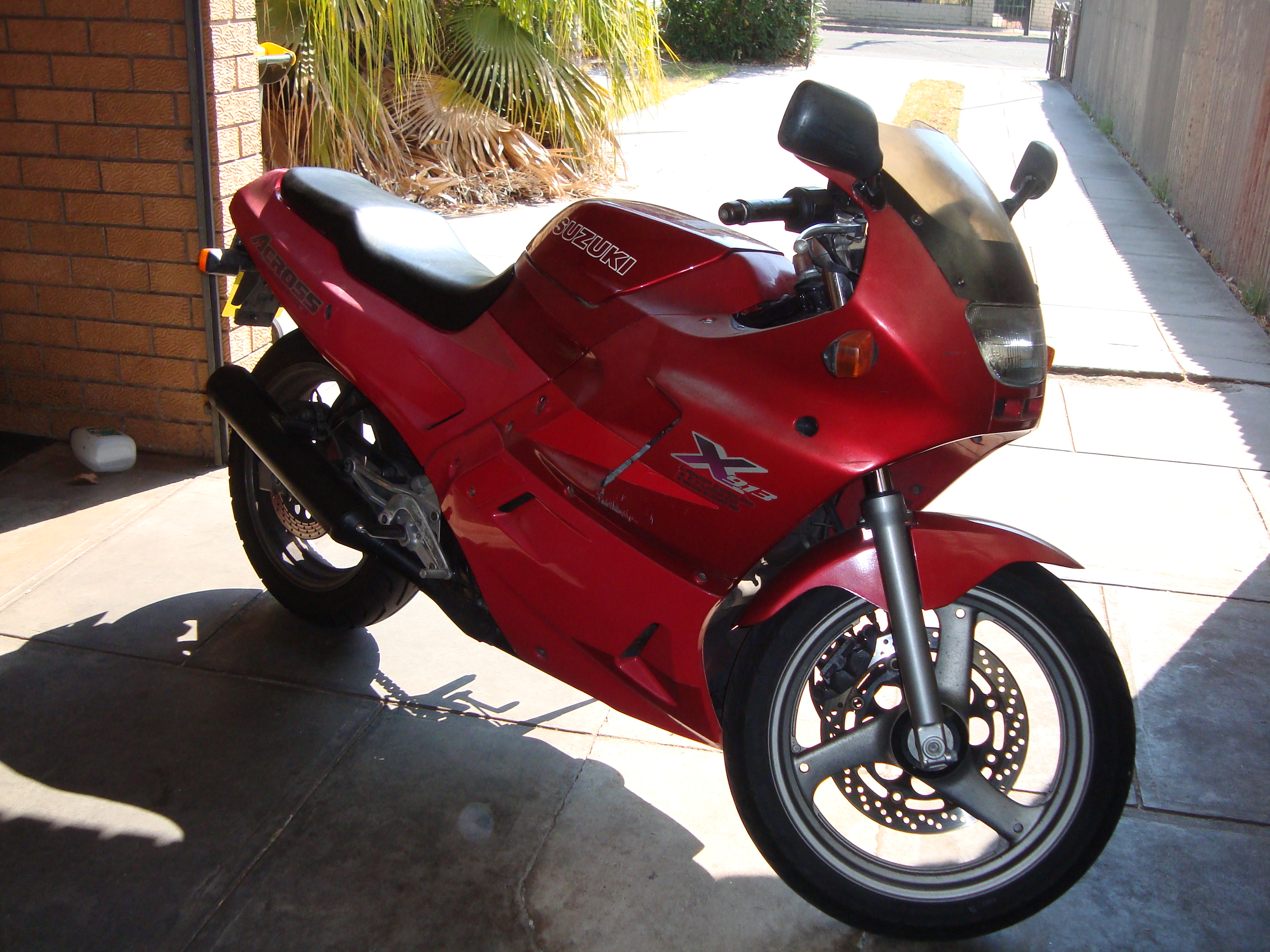
- Manufacturer: Suzuki
- Production: 1990–1998
- Predecessor: Suzuki GS250FW
- Class: Sport bike
- Engine: 249 cc (15.2 cu in) liquid-cooled 4-stroke 16-valve DOHC inline-four
- Bore / stroke: 49.0 mm × 33.0 mm (1.93 in × 1.30 in)
- Top speed: 180 km/h (110 mph)
- Power: 40–45 PS (29–33 kW) @ 14,500 rpm (crank)
- Torque: 25.5 N⋅m (18.8 lbf⋅ft) @ 10,500 rpm
- Transmission: 6-speed constant mesh
- Suspension: Front: Telescopic, coil spring oil damped Rear: Link type, coil spring, oil damped, spring preload
- Brakes: Front: Dual piston single disc Rear: Single piston disc
- Tires: Front: 110/70 17 54H; Rear: 140/70 17 66H
- Wheelbase: 1,380 mm (54.3 in)
- Dimensions: L: 2,020 mm (79.5 in); W: 695 mm (27.4 in); H: 1,120 mm (44.1 in)
- Seat height: 770 mm (30.3 in)
- Weight: 163 kg (359 lb) (dry); 172 kg (373 lb) (wet)
- Fuel capacity: 12 L (2.6 imp gal; 3.2 US gal) including 2 L reserve
- Fuel consumption: 45 mpg_{‑US} (5.2 L/100 km; 54 mpg_{‑imp})

The Suzuki GSX250F Across is a 249 cc (15.2 cu in) sport motorcycle that was produced by Suzuki Motor Corporation from 1990 until 1998.

It is mostly known as a practical sports/touring bike, due to its rear petrol tank and a fully enclosed helmet storage area where the petrol tank usually is. The Suzuki Across featured X913 decals, which caused a lot of speculation as to its origin, it has been confirmed that the X913 was in reference the project name of the motorcycle during its development cycle, early test bikes featured the decals and they eventually made it onto production bikes. The Across is known to have reasonably light handling, good fuel economy, sufficient power (45BHP), and a comfortable riding posture, making it a desirable first motorcycle for new riders or people who want to enter the sport bike scene. It is, however, approximately 20 kg heavier than most aluminum 250 cc competitors due to its steel frame.

The Across is sometimes criticized for its small fuel tank (12 L or 2.6 imp gal or 3.2 US gal), but it did feature a two-stage low-fuel warning light.

The Across is a remarkably powered motorcycle for its engine size. It features a 4-stroke 248 cc DOHC 16-valve 4-cylinder engine featuring a CDI unit and two twin carburettors. The engine revs up to 16,500 rpm and makes either 40 or 45 PS (29 or 33 kW), depending on year. Model years 1990-1993 made 45 PS, but later models were restricted to 40 PS, in line with changes in Japanese law. Earlier models featured the front brake disk on the right hand side of the wheel as well as a wider more rounded edge shaped tail light, later revisions moved the brake disk to the left-hand side and the tail light was changed to a rectangular shape.

Like the CBR250RR, the Across was officially available in Japan and Australia. The Across was not widely grey-imported elsewhere.
