= Suzuki VL 1500 Intruder LC / Boulevard C90 =

Suzuki VL 1500 Intruder LC
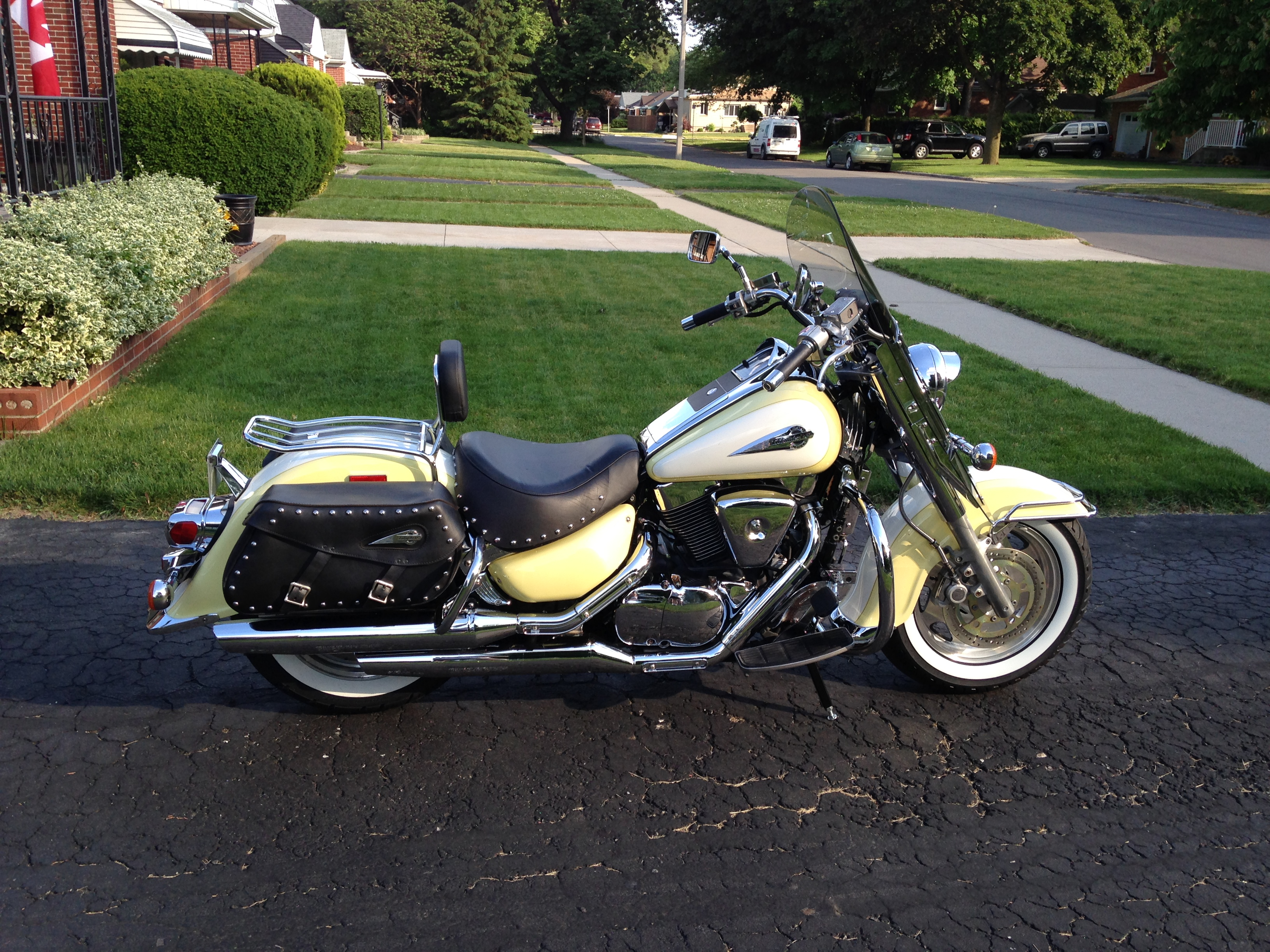
- Manufacturer: Suzuki
- Production: 1998-2004
- Class: Cruiser
- Engine: 1,462 cc (89.2 cu in) air/oil-cooled, 45° tandem V-twin
- Bore / stroke: 96 mm × 101 mm (3.8 in × 4.0 in)
- Power: 50 kW (67 hp) @ 4,800 rpm
- Torque: 114 N⋅m (84 lbf⋅ft) @ 2,300 rpm
- Transmission: Wet multiplate clutch, 5 speeds
- Tires: Cast, 3.50 x 16 in (f), 5.00 x 15 in (r)
- Wheelbase: 1,700 mm (66.9 in)
- Dimensions: L: 2,520 mm (99.4 in); W: 850 mm (33.3 in)
- Seat height: 680 mm (26.7 in)
- Related: Suzuki VL 1400

The Suzuki VL 1500 Intruder LC and Boulevard C90 are cruiser motorcycles with a feet-forward riding posture and shaft drive made by Suzuki from 1998 to 2004 as the Intruder, and since 2005 as the Boulevard.

After VL production ended with model year 2004, Suzuki updated the motorcycle with fuel-injection, renamed it to Boulevard C90 in North America (Intruder C1500 in Europe) and it remained in production until 2009.

In 2013 the C90/C1500 model was resurrected with a completely new engine and frame.

== VL 1500 Intruder LC ==
The original Suzuki VL 1500 Intruder LC had a 680 mm (26.7 in) seat height and an underseat 15.4 L; 3.40 imp gal (4.08 US gal) fuel tank. The engine is a slightly revised version of the air and oil cooled Suzuki Intruder 1400 motor: a 45° V-twin with offset crank pins to reduce vibrations. It also features shaft final drive and hydraulic clutch with a back-torque limiter.

The 3-valve single overhead camshaft valvetrain utilizes hydraulic valve lash adjusters to minimise maintenance. It produces a claimed 50 kW (67 hp) @ 4,800 rpm, and 114 N⋅m (84 lbf⋅ft) @ 2,300 rpm of torque. Models made between 1998 and 2004 were equipped with two Mikuni BDSR36 carburetors. 1998-2001 models had single brake discs on the front wheels and single disc on the rear, both fitted with simple twin piston, dual action calipers. 2002-on models were updated with a dual rotor front brake with floating, twin piston calipers, the rear brakes were upgraded with 4 piston brake calipers.

In 2004, Suzuki added a four-way emergency flasher/high beam passing switch and multi-reflector turn signals.

The VL name refers to the V-twin engine and "long" frame, 1500 is the approximate metric displacement of the engine, and the LC means Legendary Classic.

Production resumed for the C90 in the 2013 model year with a redesigned, liquid cooled 54° V-twin engine.

== Boulevard C90 ==
Suzuki Boulevard C90
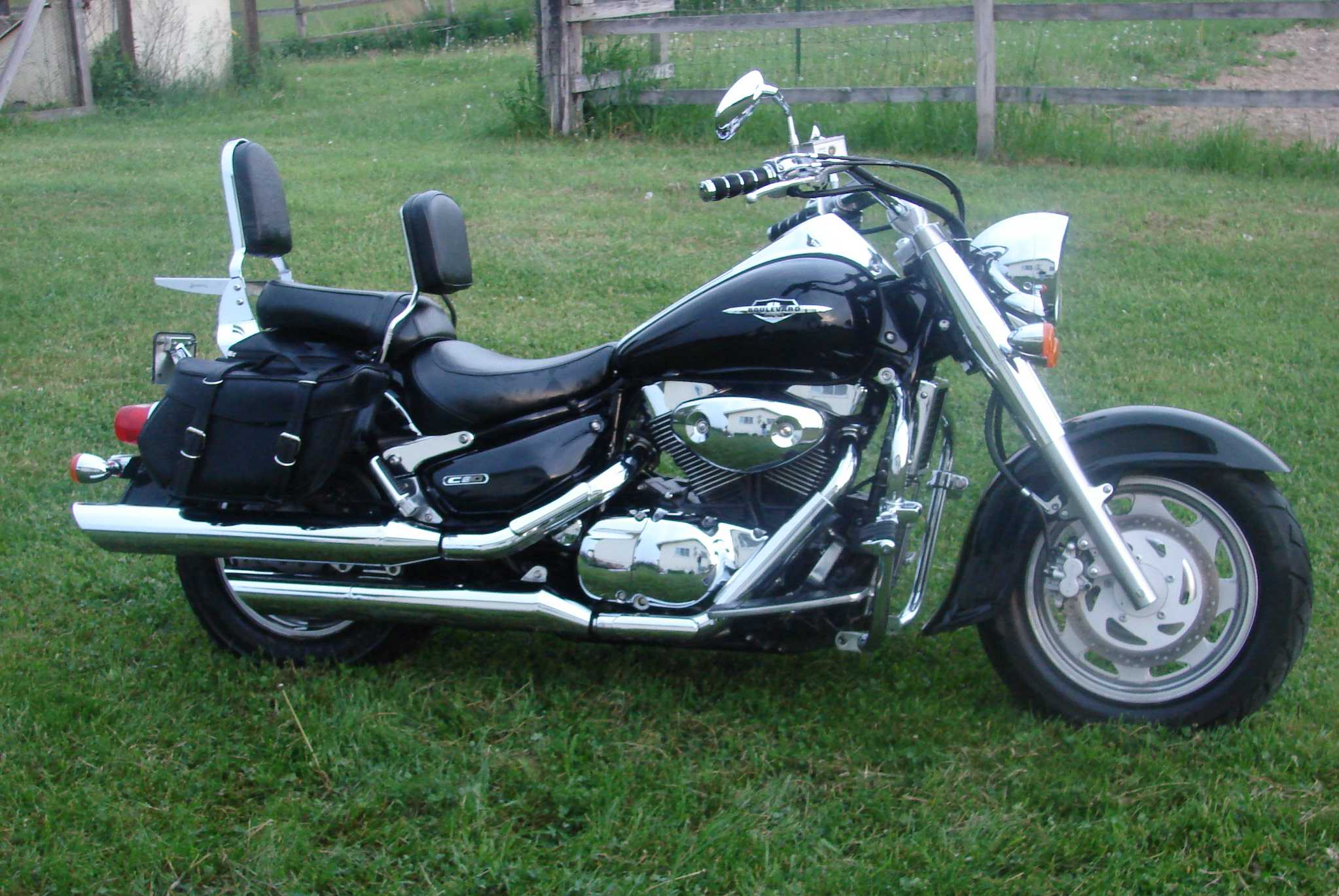
- Manufacturer: Suzuki
- Production: 2005-2010, 2013-
- Predecessor: Suzuki VL 1500 Intruder LC
- Class: Cruiser
- Engine: 1,462 cc (89.2 cu in) air/oil-cooled, 45° tandem V-twin
- Bore / stroke: 96 mm × 101 mm (3.8 in × 4.0 in)
- Power: 50 kW (67 hp) @ 4,800 rpm (claimed)
- Torque: 114 N⋅m (84 lbf⋅ft) @ 2,300 rpm (claimed)
- Transmission: Wet multiplate clutch, 5 speeds
- Tires: Machined aluminum, 16 in.front, 15 in. rear
- Wheelbase: 1,700 mm (66.9 in)
- Dimensions: L: 2,520 mm (99.4 in); W: 850 mm (33.5 in)
- Seat height: 680 mm (26.7 in)

In 2005, Suzuki re-branded its line-up of cruisers as its Boulevard series, renaming the VL1500 the Boulevard C90. Aside from a name change and cosmetic differences, Suzuki replaced the carburetors with a new multi-port fuel-injection system that was borrowed from Suzuki's Suzuki GSX-R line of racing bikes. They also added a 32-bit ECU processing chip and a marginally revised 3.7 gallon fuel tank.

The engine's torque and acceleration were increased by the introduction of the new fuel-injected system, with dual throttle valve and auto fast-idle systems. The engine uses SCEM cylinder plating. Suzuki said the engine developed 50 kW (67 hp) @ 4,800 rpm and 114 N⋅m (84 lbf⋅ft) @ 2,300 rpm.
