= Suzuki T series =

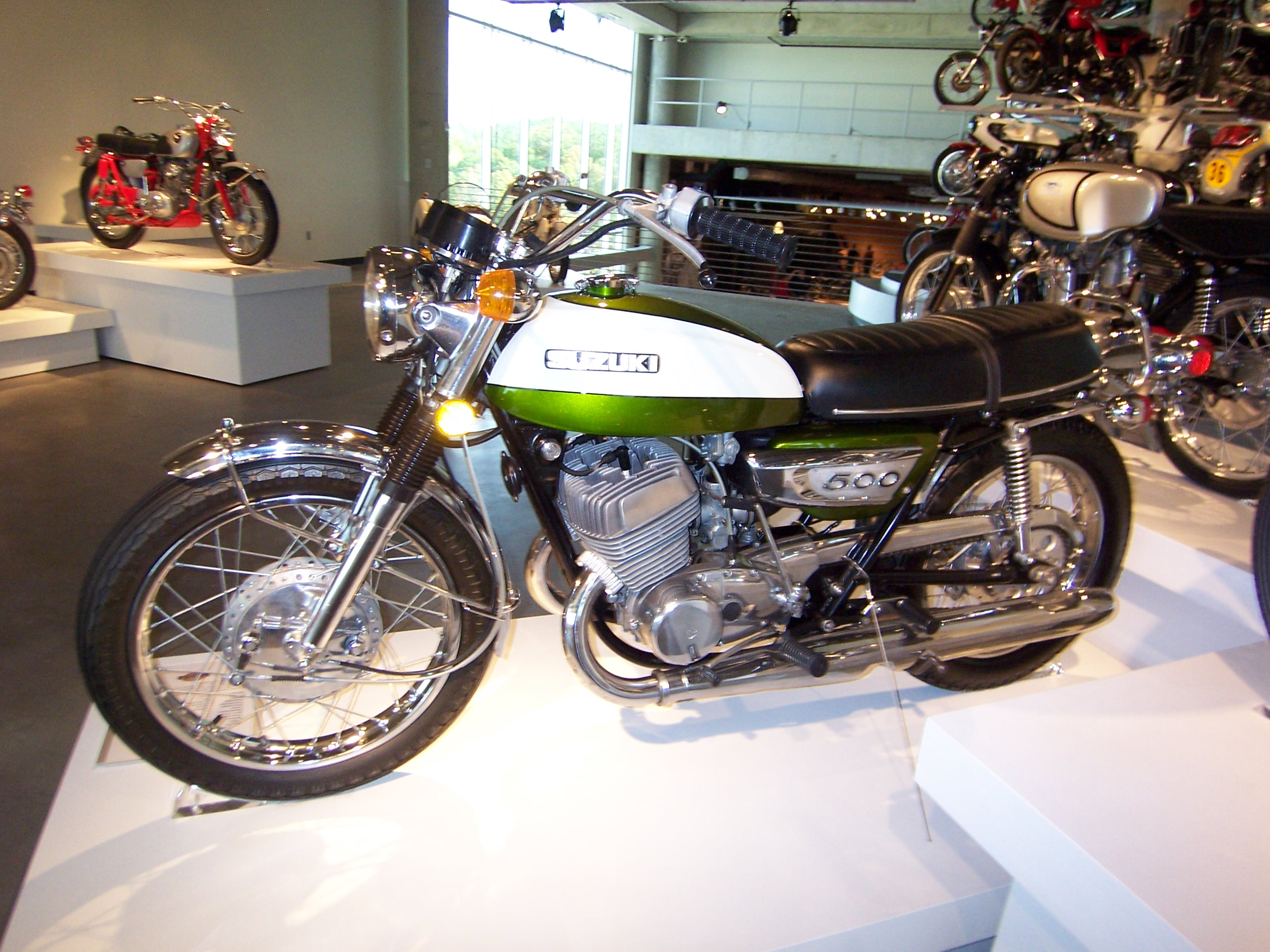
- Manufacturer: Suzuki
- Production: ca. 1963–1977
- Engine: 90–500 cc two-stroke, two-cylinder, air-cooled
- Related: GT series

The Suzuki T series was a series of motorcycle manufactured by Suzuki that ran from approximately 1963 through 1977 in various engine displacements between 90 and 500 cc.

== Construction ==
All T-series engines used piston-ported, air-cooled, two-stroke, two-cylinder engines. Lubrication was provided via premix or automatic oil injection depending on the year and model. All models through the 1965 model year were of the premix type while all models from 1966 onwards used automatic oil injection. Models 250 cc and above were fitted with large twin leading shoe drum brakes until 1975 when disc front brakes were introduced. Models under 250 cc had single leading shoe brakes. Most models had six-speed gearboxes, enabling the factory tuner to raise engine speed with the consequent narrowing of the power band.

== History ==
During the 1960s, Suzuki showed that it was serious about staying at the forefront of the motorcycle business. In the fall of 1965, they introduced the T20 Hustler twin (aka X6 or Super Six) as a 1966 model with 250 cc displacement, automatic oil injection and the world's first six-speed transmission in a production motorcycle.

In late 1967, building on their success with the T20, Suzuki introduced the T500/5 (Cobra in the US/Canada markets and Titan elsewhere) as a 1968 model. This was a 500 cc twin-cylinder air-cooled bike with a five-speed transmission. It was able to do over 100 mph, durable, handled reasonably well, especially on motorways and sweeping bends and went on to be produced in the tens of thousands until the end of the 1977 model year. The "Cobra" model name was dropped at the end of the first year of production, apparently after Suzuki received a letter from the Ford Motor Company's legal department. Ford at that time had an agreement to market the Shelby Mustang "Cobra" automobile so they took offense at Suzuki's use of the name. From that time on, the T500 was known as the "Titan" in all markets until the 1976 model year.

In 1976, the Titan was given a facelift and gained a single disc front brake. The "Titan" name was dropped and the designation became, simply, GT500 for both the 1976 and 1977 model years. At the end of the 1977 model year, the 500 was dropped from Suzuki's model line after a production run of ten model years and well over 100,000 examples produced. In Australia the T350 Rebel developed legendary status after the triumph of racer Joe Eastmure over much larger super bikes in both the 1972 and 1973 6 hour race at Amaroo, Australia. Although only 315 cc and having drum brakes, the bike was able to out race bikes with twice the engine capacity using the quick but stable handling of the bike, especially the ground clearance. The T125 was a popular, cheap and robust commuter in New Zealand. During the 1971 oil shock and recession, large numbers of Japanese home market Wolf models were imported into New Zealand and underpriced the normal export model. The key differences were a less well finished petrol tank which had a narrow raised seam running along the centre top and black painted exhaust instead of all chrome. Most of those imported were the high pipe street scrambler style. A T90 model was also imported. It did not have a tachometer. Unlike the 250, 350 and 500 models the 125 and 90 had cast iron barrels with aluminium heads angled well forward into the slip stream to lower engine temperature.

== Models ==
All engines had two parallel cylinders with air cooling.

- T90 Wolf
- T125 Stinger (or Flying Leopard/Wolf in the Japanese home market)
- T200 Invader (also known as the X5 in the North American market)
- T10 (no marketing name known; 250 cc engine with premix oiling system)
- T20 "Super Six" Hustler (also known as the X6 in the North American market; successor to the T10)
- T21 An updated version of the T20 with increased power
- T250 Hustler (successor to the T20 starting with the 1969 model year)
- T305 Raider (only actually produced for about one year ca. 1968)
- T350 Rebel (outgrowth of the T250; actual engine displacement was 315 cc)
- T500 Titan

== TC series ==
Suzuki also produced some of these models in a "high pipe" or "street scrambler" version. These models were sometimes prefixed as "TC". Specific TC models included:

- TC200 (marketed as "Stingray" in North America)
- TC250 (two versions available; one based on the T20 and one based on the T250)
- TC305 (marketed as "Laredo" in North America)

The TC models listed above had nothing in common with the later off-road models that Suzuki built under the same (TC) model designation. Those later bikes were all single-cylinder machines with dual range transmissions and proper knobby-type off-road tires. The T125 was produced in both high and low pipes -both using the same model number T125.
