= Suzuki Hustler (disambiguation) =

The Suzuki Hustler is a crossover SUV-styled kei car produced by the Japanese automaker Suzuki.

Suzuki Hustler may also refer to:

- Suzuki T20, a motorcycle known in the US as the X6 Hustler
- Suzuki T250 Hustler, a motorcycle produced from 1969 to 1972
- Suzuki GT250, a motorcycle known in the US as the Hustler
