= Suzuki GT250 =

Two-stroke, twin-cylinder motorcycle

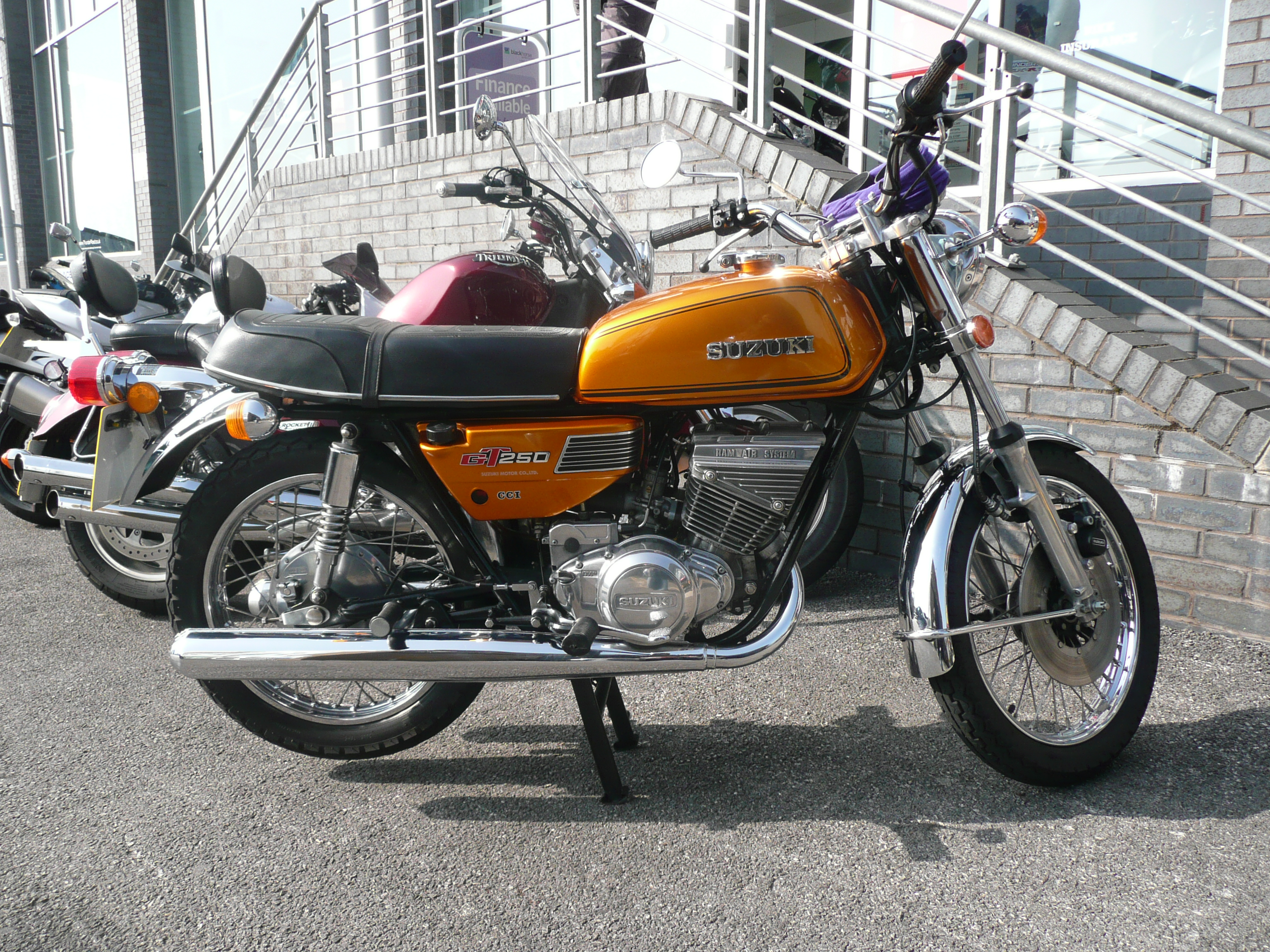
- Suzuki GT250 Ram Air model
- Manufacturer: Suzuki
- Also called: Suzuki Hustler
- Production: 1971-1981
- Predecessor: Suzuki T250
- Class: Standard
- Engine: 247 cc (15.1 cu in) air-cooled two-stroke parallel twin
- Bore / stroke: 54 mm × 54 mm (2.1 in × 2.1 in)
- Compression ratio: 7.5:1
- Top speed: 90 mph (140 km/h); 100 mph (160 km/h) (X7)
- Power: 26–32 bhp (19–24 kW)
- Transmission: Multiplate wet clutch, 6 speed
- Frame type: Duplex cradle
- Suspension: Front: telescopic forks Rear: swinging arm
- Wheelbase: 1,310 mm (52 in)
- Seat height: 785 mm (30.9 in)
- Weight: 146 kg (322 lb); 128 kg (282 lb) (X7) (dry)

The Suzuki GT250, also known as the Suzuki Hustler in the US, is a 247 cc (15.1 cu in), two-stroke, twin-cylinder motorcycle produced by the Japanese Suzuki company between 1971 and 1981. The model was developed from the earlier T250, and was one of the best selling motorcycles in its class. For 1978 the bike was redesigned and marketed as the GT250 X7. The X7 was capable of reaching 100 mph (160 km/h) in favourable conditions. The model range was discontinued in 1981 in favour of Suzuki's four stroke models, and the X7 was developed into the RG250 Gamma.

== Technical details ==
=== Engine and transmission ===
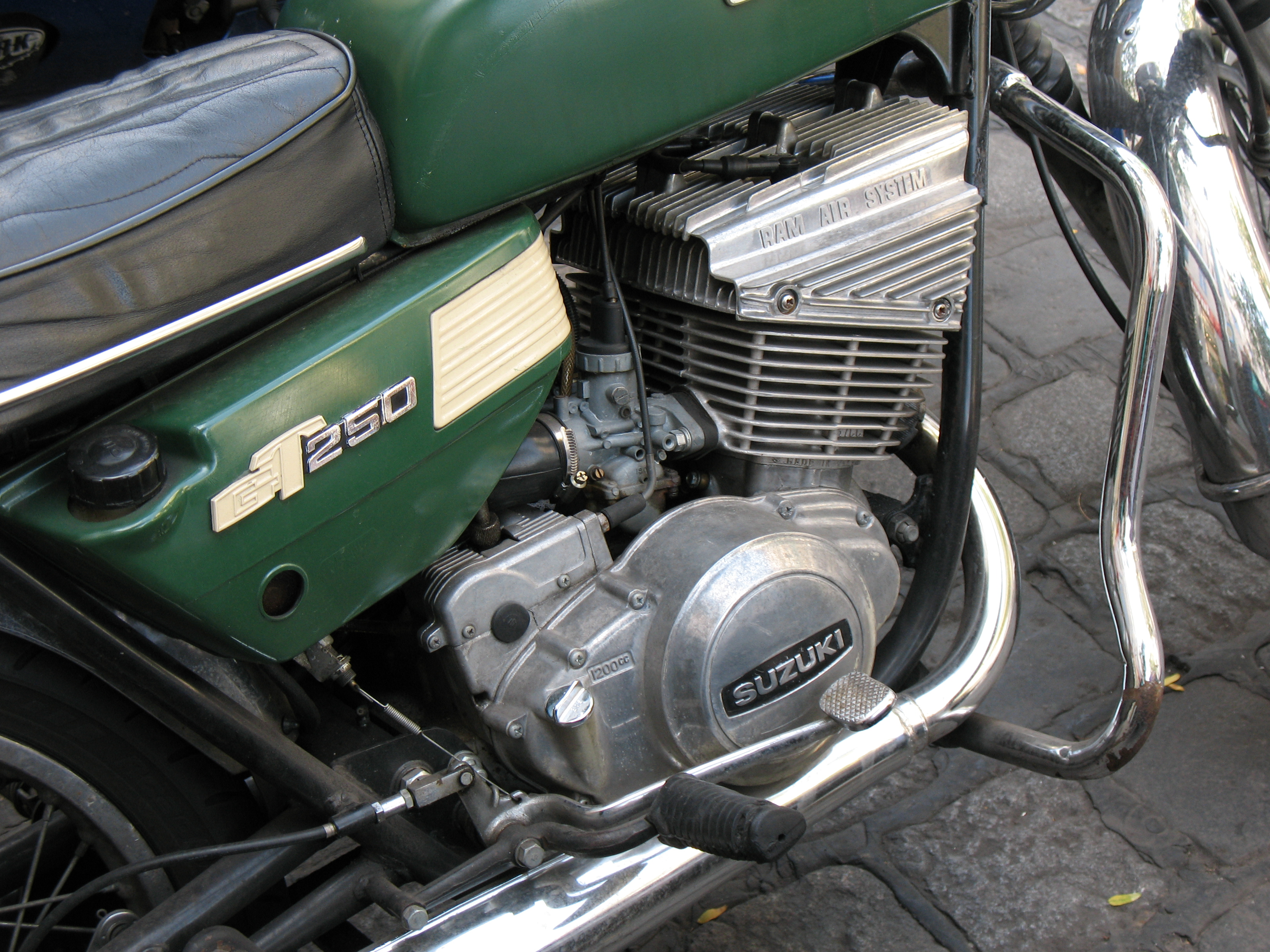
Ram Air engine

The T250's engine was a development of the earlier T20, which had been introduced in 1966. The 180° piston ported two stroke twin was of unit construction and had alloy head and alloy barrels with cast iron liners. Bore and stroke were 54 mm × 54 mm (2.1 in × 2.1 in) and the claimed power output was 31 bhp (23 kW) at 7,000 rpm. In 1971 the Ram Air System cooling duct, as used on the GT380 and GT550, was added to the cylinder head. It is debated whether the Ram Air System improved cooling significantly or was a cosmetic addition.

In 1976 the engine was revised; the main bearings were increased in number from three to four and two extra transfer port added, increasing power to 32 bhp (24 kW) at 7,500 rpm. The ram air was removed and the fins on the head enlarged to compensate.

A new engine was designed for the 1978 X7 model. Whilst retaining the 54 mm bore and stroke, the engine was more compact and weighed 7.8 kg (17 lb) less than the GT250C engine. The new engine used Suzuki's dual induction system, first used on its off-road bikes. The system used both piston porting and reed valves, which gave better response through the rev range.

Ignition was by twin coils with points mounted on the end of the crankshaft. Fuel was delivered by twin 26 mm Mikuni carburettors, which had restrictive slides to reduce intake noise. The carbs were increased to 28 mm in 1975 and were rubber mounted. The carbs were reduced to 26 mm on the X7 to increase mid-range power. The engine was lubricated by Suzuki's CCI system.

Primary drive was by helical gears to a multi-plate wet clutch. The six speed gearbox received revised second and third gear ratios in 1976. Chain drive took power to the rear wheel.

=== Cycle parts ===
The duplex cradle frame of the T20 was modified for the T250 with larger gusset plates around the headstock. The T250 frame was modified for the T250J and GT250 with a longer steerer tube. Rear suspension was by swinging arm with twin shock absorbers. At the front telescopic forks were used.

A new single downtube frame was designed for the X7, which saved 1.5 kg (3.3 lb) over the previous frame.

Initially brakes were drums front and rear, the front being an effective 2ls item. The front brake was replaced in 1972 with a single disc, which suffered poor wet weather performance.

== Model variants ==
The first of the GT250 models was introduced to the Japanese home market in 1971 and apart from some cosmetic changes was identical to the T250. The Ram Air System and disc frame brake were added in 1972. In 1973 the model was introduced to export markets.

=== GT250 ===
Introduced to the Japanese domestic market only in 1971, the model was based on the T250 and had styling similar to the T350.

=== GT250 II ===
Still only for the Japanese market, the 1972 GT250 II gained a disc front brake, gaiter on the front forks and Suzuki's Ram Air system.

=== GT250K/L/M ===
In 1973 the bike was restyled and released in Europe and America in 1973 as the GT250K. The exhausts were modified to comply with noise and emission regulations which reduced power. It was available in red, candy blue, candy pink or green with a white or silver stripe, outlined in black. The 1974 L and 1975 M models had minor cosmetic changes only.

=== GT250A/B/C ===
An updated engine was introduced in 1976 with a 4 bearing crankshaft, 2 extra transfer ports and larger carbs which increased power. The Ram Air System was removed. Although the GT250A faster than the previous model, it suffered from lack of power below 4,000 rpm. In the UK the model was heavily advertised with the then 500cc world champion Barry Sheene heading the campaign. The GT250 became the top selling 250 cc bike, the learner class at the time. The 1977 B and 1978 C models only differed by minor cosmetic changes.

=== GT250 X7 ===
The bike was redesigned for the 1978 X7 (known as the X7E in Germany and RG250 in Japan). The bike was 18 kg (40 lb) lighter than the GT250C and more compact. Although producing no more power than previous models, the new engine was more tractable. The lighter and more compact X7 was capable of 100 mph (160 km/h) under favourable conditions. The X7 continued in production until 1981 and formed the basis of the RG250 Gamma.
