= Suzuki T500 =

Two-stroke, twin-cylinder motorcycle

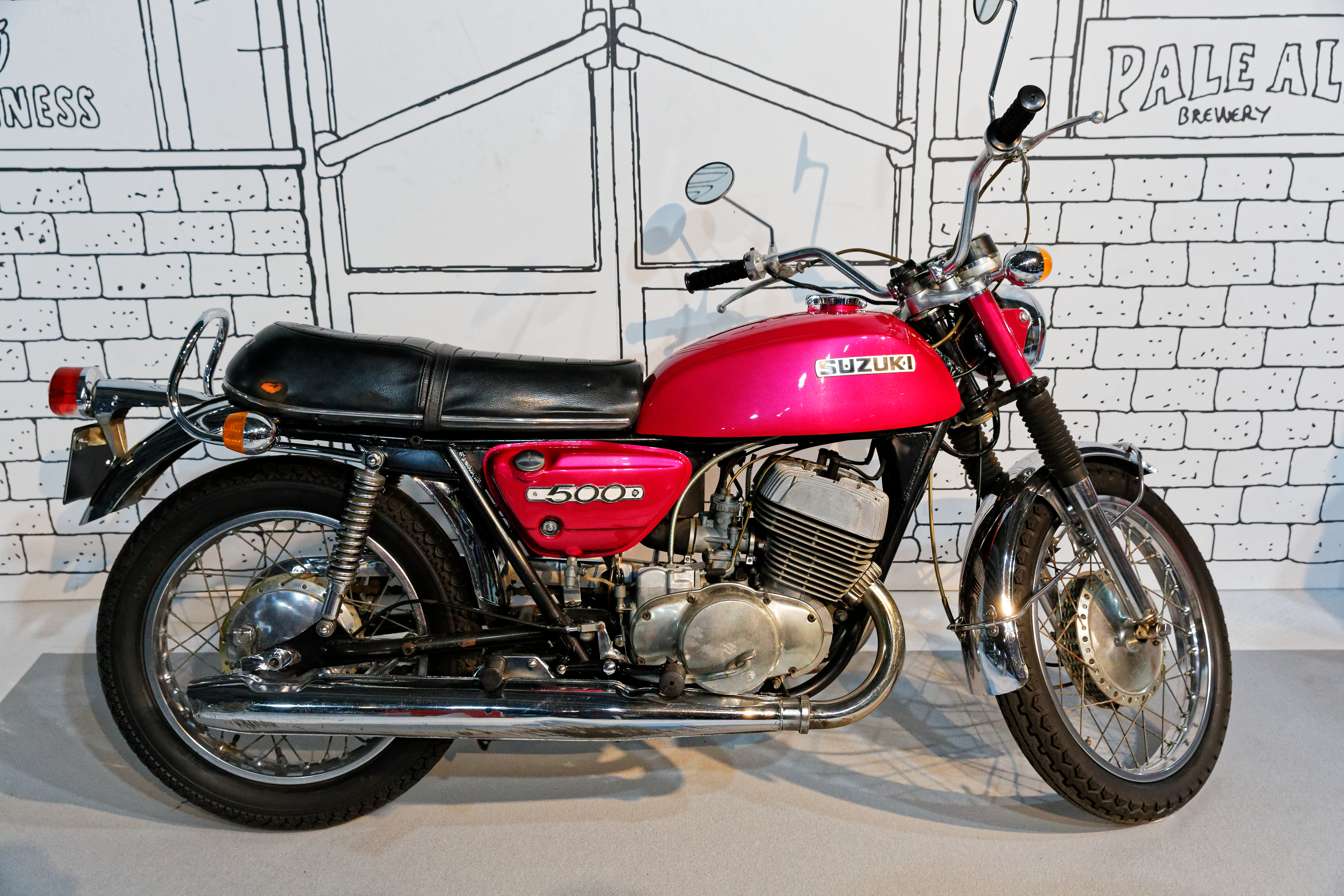
- 1972 Suzuki T500
- Manufacturer: Suzuki
- Also called: Suzuki T500/Five; Suzuki Charger; Suzuki Cobra; Suzuki Titan
- Production: 1968-1975
- Class: Standard
- Engine: 492 cc (30.0 cu in) air-cooled two-stroke parallel twin
- Bore / stroke: 70 mm × 64 mm (2.8 in × 2.5 in)
- Compression ratio: 6.6:1
- Top speed: 105 mph (169 km/h)
- Power: 47 bhp (35 kW) @ 7,000 rpm
- Transmission: Multiplate wet clutch, 5 speed
- Frame type: Duplex cradle
- Suspension: Front: telescopic forks Rear: swinging arm
- Brakes: Front: 2ls drum Rear: drum
- Tyres: Front: 325x19 Rear: 400x18
- Weight: 187 kg (412 lb) (dry)

The Suzuki T500, variously known as the Suzuki T500/Five, Suzuki Charger, Suzuki Cobra and the Suzuki Titan during its model life, is a 492 cc (30.0 cu in), two-stroke, twin-cylinder motorcycle produced by the Japanese Suzuki company between 1968 and 1975. The model was developed as a larger version of the Suzuki T20 which was intended to compete with the large-capacity British twins in the American market. When introduced it was Suzuki's largest displacement machine. Overengineering of the engine led to the bike gaining a reputation for reliability, and being virtually bulletproof. A total of over 100,000 units were sold during the model's production.

== History ==
Model designations
1968	T500
1969	T500 II
1970	T500 III
1971	T500R
1972	T500J
1973	T500K
1974	T500L
1975	T500M

There was a generally held view in the 1960s that an air cooled two stroke larger than 350cc was impractical to build as it would overheat, would be unmanageable to ride due to its narrow power band and use too much fuel. Building on the success of the T20, Suzuki built a 500 that dispelled this theory. The original model, the T500/Five, was advertised as the sports cycle that couldn't be made.

The T500/Five, which was introduced in 1968, suffered handling problems. An updated Mk II version was soon launched, which had the swingarm extended to improve handling. To differentiate the revised version from the original, the model was renamed the Cobra which was objected to by Ford/Shelby who manufactured the Shelby Cobra. A name change to Charger was objected to by Dodge, who were making a car called the Charger. The name was again changed to Titan. In the UK motorcycle dealer and accessory manufacturers, Reads of Leytonstone, had the trademark Titan for their cafe racer body kits, so the Suzuki was known in the UK simply as the T500.

In 1969 the bike was restyled and the carbs reduced to 32mm from 34mm which gave better fuel economy. The barrels had revised porting and now had 11 fins instead of the previous 10 and new pistons were fitted. After some machines suffered piston failures, stronger pistons as used on the GT 750 were fitted.

A MK III was introduced in 1971 which had a revised tank with a luggage rack mounted on it. There were also gearbox updates and the swinging arm was again lengthened bringing the wheelbase up to 59 in (1,500 mm).

Some failures of fourth and fifth gears had occurred. To overcome this gearbox oil capacity was increased in 1973 on the T500K model. The engine's bottom end was also strengthened in 1973.

=== GT500 ===
In 1976 the bike was restyled and designated as the GT500 to bring it in line with the rest of the Suzuki range. The sporty GT 380 and GT550 were by now well established and the 500 was now seen as a tourer. The porting was revised and the inlet tract lengthened to produce more torque, although this reduced peak power to 44 bhp (33 kW) @ 6,000 rpm. The larger tank from the GT 750 was fitted along with the front forks and front disc brake from the 380/550. The crankshaft was modified to take the pick-up for the electronic PEI (Pointless Energy Ignition system).

Emission regulations, especially in the US, made it difficult for two strokes to comply with the requirements and Suzuki changed its focus to four strokes, dropping the GT500 in 1978.

== Racing ==
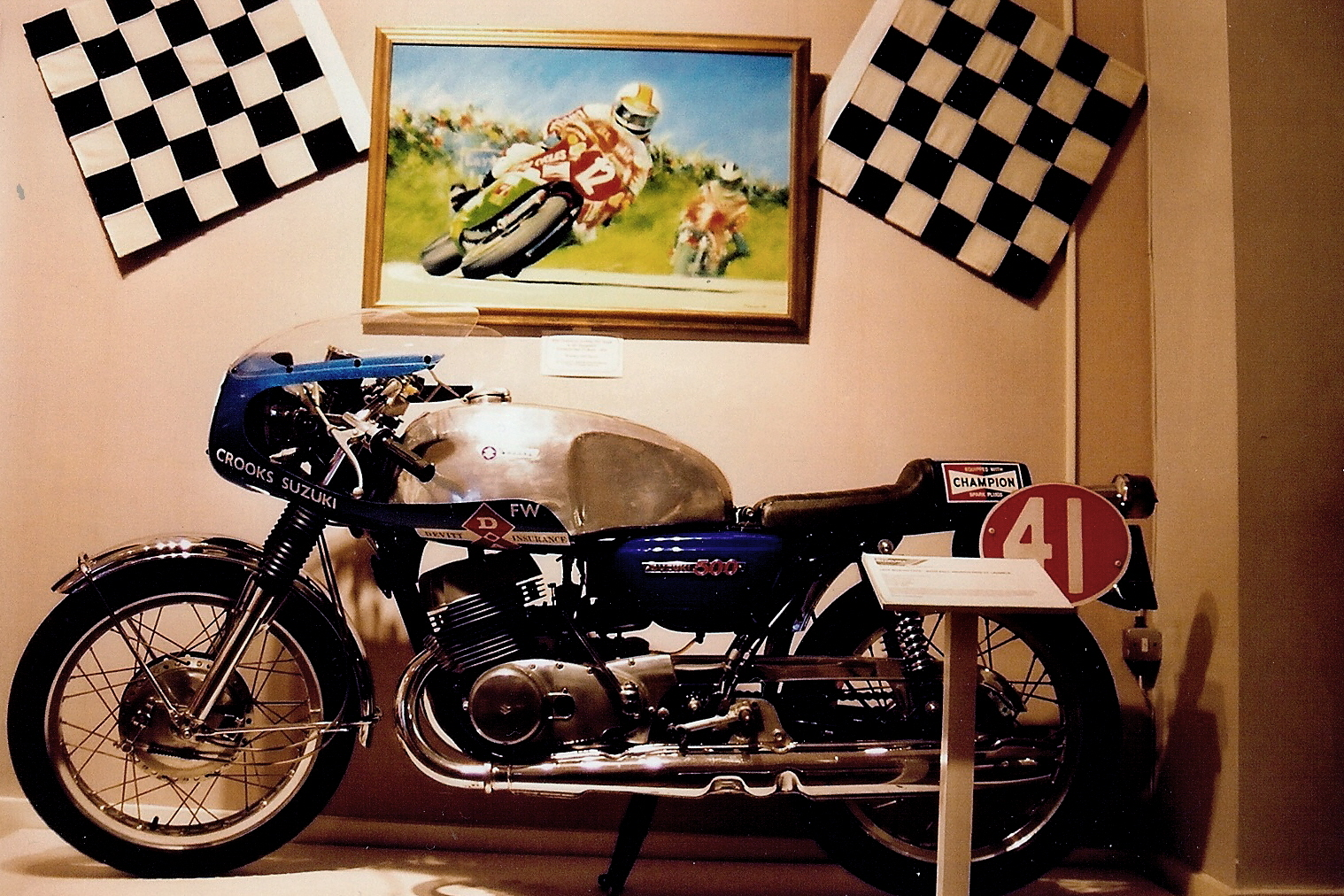
1970 Suzuki T500 race-prepared by Eddie Crooks, winning machine in the 1970 500 cc Production Class TT race ridden by Frank Whiteway, on display at the Manx Museum

The T500 became popular in production racing, with Frank Whiteway winning the 500 cc Production IOM TT in 1970 and Stan Woods winning in the 1972 race.

A Grand Prix racing version of the bike was developed, the TR500. In 1968 the racer was capable of 135 mph (217 km/h) and development raised the top speed to 147 mph (237 km/h) the following year. Suzuki gained its first 500 GP at the 1971 Ulster Grand Prix in the hands of Jack Findlay, who also won the 1973 Senior TT. In 1973 the racer gained water cooling and had a top speed of 160 mph (260 km/h).

== Technical details ==
=== Engine and transmission ===
The T500's engine was developed from the T20's unit. The 180° piston ported two stroke twin was of unit construction and had alloy head and alloy barrels with cast iron liners. The engine was over-square with a bore and stroke of 70 mm × 64 mm (2.8 in × 2.5 in) giving a displacement of 492 cc (30.0 cu in). A built-up crankshaft sat in horizontally split crankcases. To keep width down, the cylinders were rotated outward so the exhausts exited outside the frame's twin downtubes. The engine had a compression of 6.6:1. Claimed power output was 47 bhp (35 kW) @ 7,000 rpm, giving the machine a top speed of 105 mph (169 km/h).

Fuel was delivered by twin 34 mm Mikuni carburettors on the first models, but smaller 32 mm carbs were fitted from 1969 to improve fuel consumption. The engine was lubricated by Suzuki Posi Force system which injected oil to the main bearings, conrod journals and cylinder bores. Ignition was by coil and two sets of points.

Primary drive was by helical gears to a multi-plate wet clutch and five speed gearbox. The gearbox has a 'safety feature' that prevented downshifting from second to first unless the machine was stationary, although this was dropped in 1971. Chain drive took power to the rear wheel.

=== Cycle parts ===
The duplex cradle frame was stiffer than some of its competitors, leading to a reputation for good handling. Rear suspension was by swinging arm with twin shock absorbers. At the front telescopic forks were used. Brakes were drums front and rear, the front being an effective 2ls item.
