= Suzuki T250 =

Two-stroke, twin-cylinder motorcycle

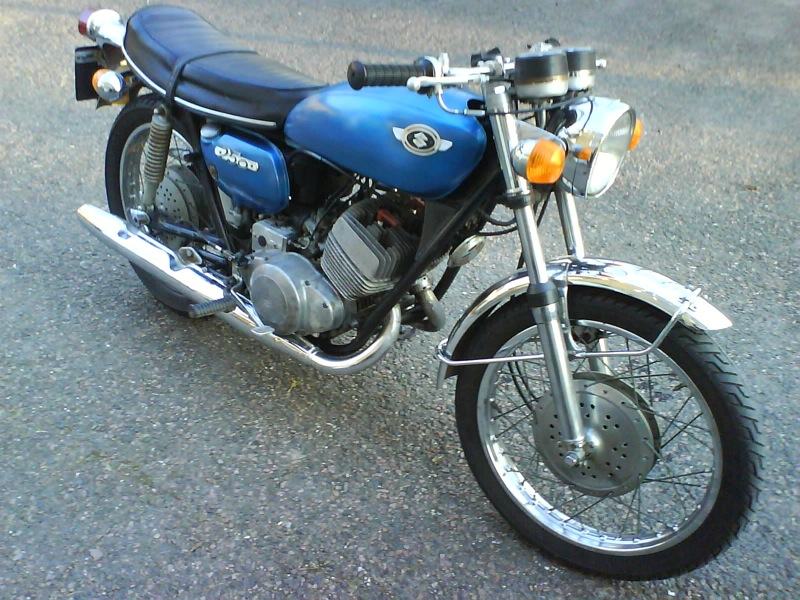
- 1970 Suzuki T250
- Manufacturer: Suzuki
- Also called: Suzuki Hustler
- Production: 1969-1972
- Predecessor: Suzuki T20
- Successor: Suzuki GT250
- Class: Standard
- Engine: 247 cc (15.1 cu in) air-cooled two-stroke parallel twin
- Bore / stroke: 54 mm × 54 mm (2.1 in × 2.1 in)
- Compression ratio: 7.5:1
- Top speed: 105 mph (169 km/h) (claimed)
- Power: 32 bhp (24 kW) @ 8,000 rpm
- Transmission: Multiplate wet clutch, 6 speed
- Frame type: Duplex cradle
- Suspension: Front: telescopic forks Rear: swinging arm
- Brakes: Front: 200 mm (7.9 in) 2ls drum Rear : 180 mm (7.1 in) sls drum
- Tyres: Front: 300x18 Rear: 325x18
- Wheelbase: 1,290 mm (51 in)
- Dimensions: L: 1,990 mm (78 in); W: 870 mm (34 in); H: 1,070 mm (42 in)
- Seat height: 785 mm (30.9 in)
- Weight: 145 kg (320 lb) (dry)
- Fuel capacity: 12 L (2.6 imp gal; 3.2 US gal)

The Suzuki T250, also known as the Suzuki Hustler, is a 247 cc (15.1 cu in), two-stroke, twin-cylinder motorcycle produced by the Japanese Suzuki company between 1969 and 1972. The model was developed from the earlier T20 and was one of the models that contributed to Suzuki's success in the early 1970s.

== Technical details ==
=== Engine and transmission ===
The T250's engine was a development of the earlier T20, which had been introduced in 1966. The 180° piston ported two stroke twin was of unit construction and had alloy head and alloy barrels with cast iron liners. Bore and stroke were 54 mm × 54 mm (2.1 in × 2.1 in) and the claimed power output was 32 bhp (24 kW) @ 8,000 rpm, giving the machine a claimed top speed of 105 mph (169 km/h.

Fuel was delivered by twin 24 mm Mikuni carburettors on the earlier models. They were enlarged to 26 mm in 1971. The engine was lubricated by the proven Suzuki Posi Force system, which injected oil onto the conrods, big ends and cylinder walls. This was updated to CCI in 1970, which reduced exhaust emissions at low revs by recycling excess oil.

Primary drive was by helical gears to a multi-plate wet clutch. The six speed gearbox had larger gears than the T20 to improve reliability and to improve the gearchange. Chain drive took power to the rear wheel.

=== Cycle parts ===
The frame of the T250 was a strengthened version of the T20's frame that increased torsional stiffness which led to better handling. Rear suspension was by swinging arm with twin shock absorbers. At the front 34 mm diameter telescopic forks were used.

Brakes were drums front and rear, the front being an effective 2ls item. The spoked wheels were fitted with 300 x 18 front and 325 x 18 rear tyres.

== Model variants ==
An updated version of the T20, known as the T21, which developed 30.5 bhp (22.7 kW) had been introduced in 1967. This was known in Japan as the T250, inline with the newly introduced T125 and the T200 models. Models sold in the US had higher handlebars than those sold in Europe.

=== 1969 T250 Hustler ===
Initial model which was known as the MK 2 in Japan, the T-250 X-6R Hustler in the US and retrospectively as the T250-I. The model used the front forks, 24 mm carb engine, tail lamp bracket, seat and clocks of the T21.

=== 1970 T250 II Hustler ===
The T250-II (Mk 3 in Japan) had a new teardrop tank, seat, front forks and individual instruments. The rear light was mounted higher up to meet new US laws. A cranked kickstart was fitted, which was necessary on the scrambler model to clear the exhaust. The Posi force lubrication system was upgraded to the new CCI system.

==== 1970 T250 II Scrambler ====
A scrambler version was available with high level black exhausts. This variant was also known as the TC 250.

=== 1971 T250R Hustler ===
Larger 26 mm carbs were fitted to the '71 model along with wider tyres and there were cosmetic changes to the paintwork along with new switchgear. The T250R was available in orange or turquoise, both having a candy finish.

=== 1972 T250J Hustler ===
The final year of the model saw new instruments and switchgear and cosmetic changes. It was to be replaced with the Suzuki GT250, which had been introduced in Japan in '71.

==== 1972 TT250 ====
Only available in the UK, the TT250 shared the same tank and side panels plus cylinder heads as the T350 Rebel. The machine was not fitted with a grab rail.
