= Suzuki GT750 =

Suzuki motorcycle

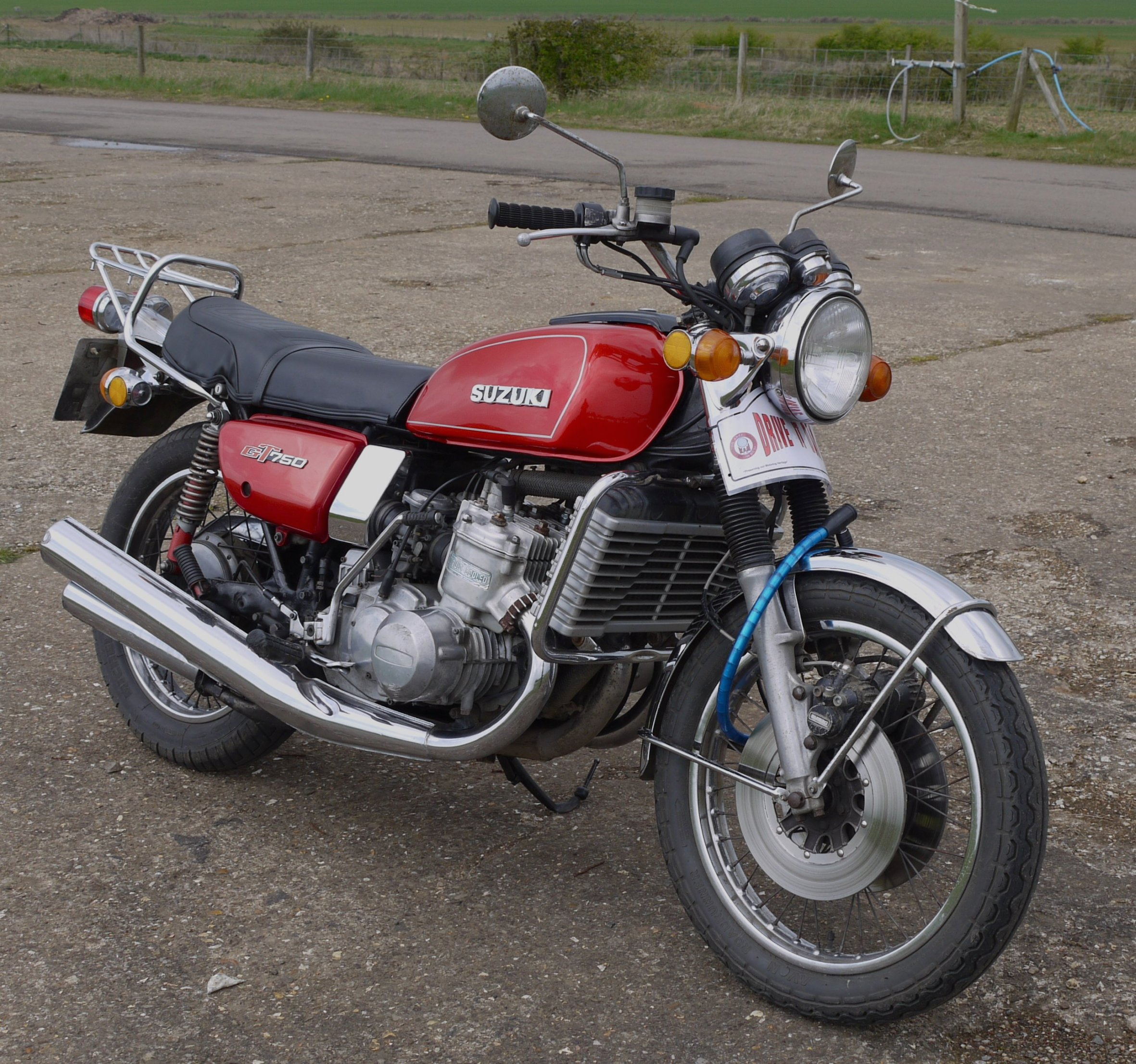
- Manufacturer: Suzuki
- Also called: Le Mans (in the US & Canada)
- Production: 1971–1977
- Predecessor: T500
- Engine: 739 cc (45.1 cu in) two-stroke water-cooled three-cylinder
- Bore / stroke: 70.0 mm × 64.0 mm (2.76 in × 2.52 in)
- Top speed: 180 km/h (110 mph) (claimed)
- Power: 67 bhp (50 kW) @ 6,500 rpm
- Transmission: 5-speed manual w/chain final drive
- Brakes: Front: twin disc Rear: 180 mm w/single panel 1 leading shoe
- Tires: Front: 3.25 x 19; Rear: 4.00 x 18
- Wheelbase: 1,460 mm (57.5 in)
- Dimensions: L: 2,210 mm (87.2 in); W: 860 mm (34 in); H: 1,130 mm (44.3 in)
- Weight: 219 kg (482 lb) (dry)
- Fuel capacity: 17 L (3.7 imp gal; 4.5 US gal)
- Oil capacity: Transmission: 2.2 litres; Oil injection tank: 1.8 litres
- Turning radius: 2.6 metres

The Suzuki GT750 is a water-cooled three-cylinder two-stroke motorcycle made by Suzuki from 1971 to 1977. It is the first Japanese motorcycle with a liquid-cooled engine. The Society of Automotive Engineers of Japan (in Japanese) includes the 1971 Suzuki GT750 as one of their 240 Landmarks of Japanese Automotive Technology.

== Introduction ==
The prototype Suzuki GT750 was shown at the 17th Tokyo Motor Show in October 1970 and launched in Japan in September 1971 as a sports tourer (GT standing for Grand Tourismo) and was developed from the Suzuki T500 with an extra cylinder and liquid cooling. Marketed as the Le Mans in the US and Canada, it was nicknamed the "Kettle" in Britain, the "Water Bottle" in Australia, and the "Water Buffalo" in the United States. The GT750 was heavy at 249 kg wet (549 lb), with a 739 cc two-stroke three-cylinder engine with 70 mm bore and 64 mm stroke. It had a five-speed gearbox and three-into-four exhaust.

== 1972 model ==
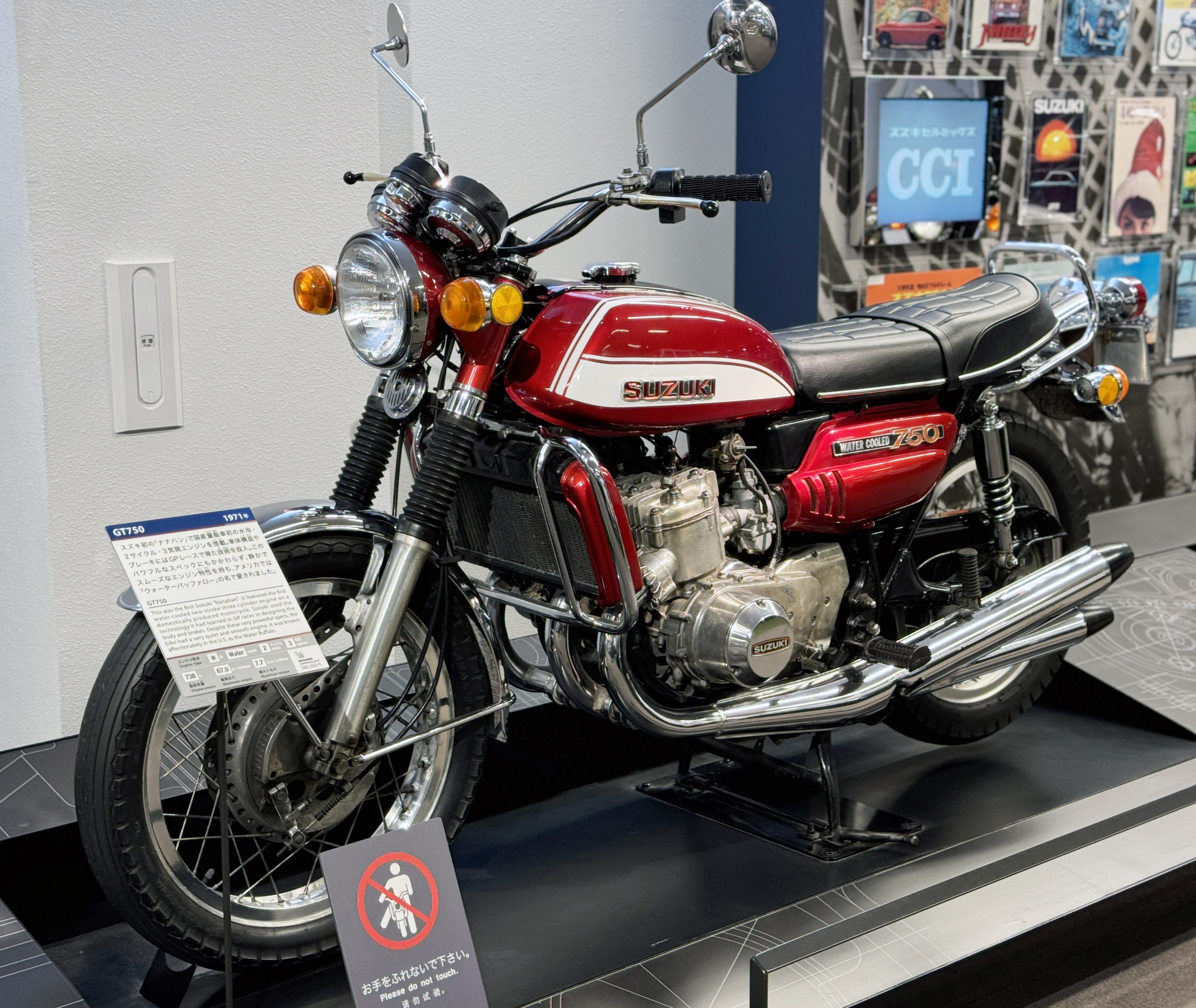
Very early GT750 with front drum brake

The first model year (1972), the GT750J, had a double-sided, twin-leading shoe, 200 mm drum front brake with 180 mm drum rear. The Exhaust Coupler Tube System (ECTS) that connected the left- and right-side exhausts together was designed to boost low-end torque. Carburetors were 32 mm Mikuni slide type and power output was 67 bhp at 6,500 rpm. Also included was Suzuki's SRIS (Suzuki Recycle Injection System) which was a method for lowering the visible exhaust smoke by collecting and burning residual oil/gas lying in the bottom of the crank chambers. This was a first for any two-stroke from any manufacturer.

== 1973-1975 models - improved brakes, retuned engine, higher gearing ==
In 1973 the Suzuki GT750K was announced with extra chrome plating and two 295 mm discs replacing the drum front brake. No other manufacturer was offering dual front disc brakes at this time, so this was quite a marketing coup for Suzuki. The following year the GT750L gained unitized/rack mounted 40 mm Mikuni CV type carburetors, a gear position indicator added to the instrumentation and redesigned side covers along with other detail changes. The connecting pipe between the exhausts was removed and the exhausts redesigned to improve road clearance. The engine was also re-tuned with an increase in power to 70 bhp for the Japanese domestic market starting in January, 1974. The rest of the world received these changes with the introduction of the 1975 Suzuki GT750M with the new silencers without connecting pipes, raised gearing and power output increased by 3 bhp, now giving a top speed of 120 mph. Handling and performance were thus improved.

== 1976- models - minor changes and discontinuation ==
The 1976 GT750A model pretty much stayed the course with only minor changes to trim items and the obligatory paint colour change. The final 1977 model GT750B had black side panels regardless of tank colour, black headlamp holders, brown faced instruments instead of blue, updated turn signal indicators/lights and taillight assembly.

As with all big two strokes of the late 1970s, the GT750 was a victim of stricter emission regulations and competition from technical developments of four-stroke motorcycles.

== See also ==
- Suzuki GT series
- Suzuki GT550
