= Suzuki Raider =

Suzuki Raider may refer to:

- Suzuki Raider 150, motorcycle manufactured by Suzuki from 2003
- Suzuki T305 Raider, 305 cc motorcycle manufactured by Suzuki in 1968-69
