= Suzuki T200 =

Two-stroke, twin-cylinder motorcycle

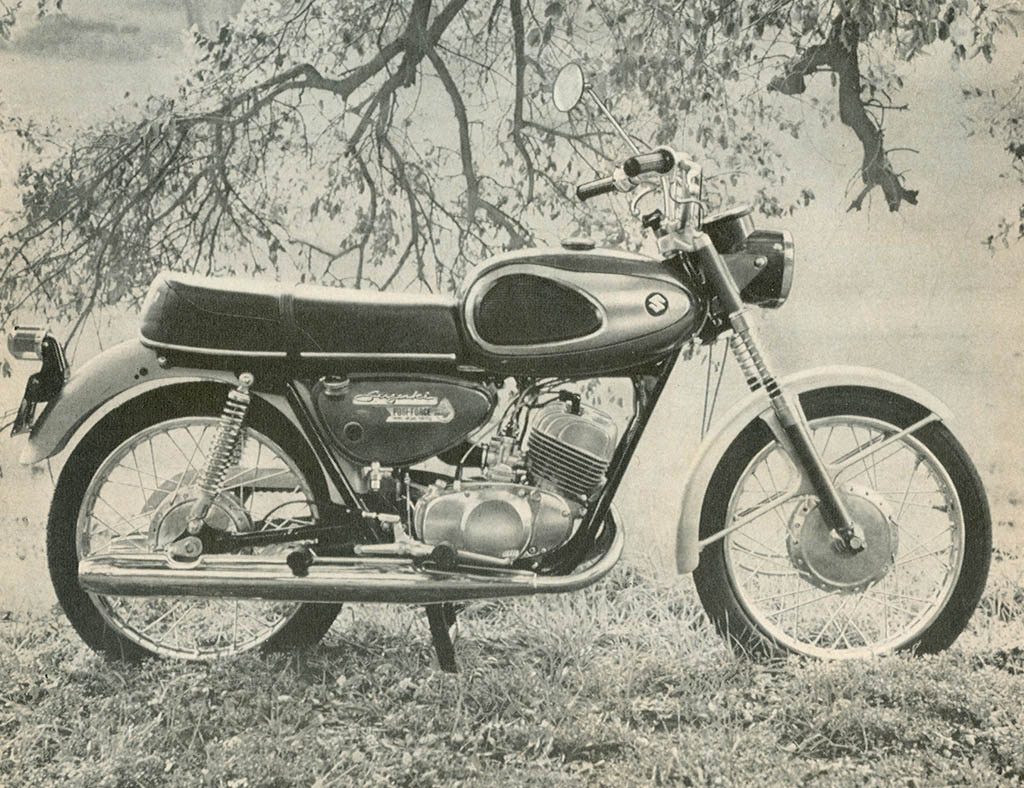
- 1967 Suzuki T200
- Manufacturer: Suzuki
- Also called: Suzuki Invader; Suzuki X5
- Production: 1967-1971
- Class: Standard
- Engine: 196 cc (12.0 cu in) air-cooled two-stroke parallel twin
- Bore / stroke: 50 mm × 50 mm (2.0 in × 2.0 in)
- Compression ratio: 7:1
- Top speed: 85 mph (137 km/h)
- Power: 23 bhp (17 kW) @ 7,500 rpm
- Transmission: Multiplate wet clutch, 5 speed
- Frame type: Duplex cradle
- Suspension: Front: telescopic forks Rear: swinging arm
- Brakes: Front: 160 mm (6.3 in) 2ls drum Rear: 150 mm (5.9 in) drum
- Tyres: Front: 275x18 Rear: 275x18
- Wheelbase: 1,270 mm (50 in)
- Weight: 120 kg (260 lb) (dry)
- Fuel capacity: 12 L (2.6 imp gal; 3.2 US gal)

The Suzuki T200, also known as the Suzuki Invader and the X5 in the US, is a 196 cc (12.0 cu in), two-stroke, twin-cylinder motorcycle produced by the Japanese Suzuki company between 1967 and 1971. The model was a scaled down version of the Suzuki T20.

== Technical details ==
=== Engine and transmission ===
The T200's engine was a scaled down version of the T20's unit. The 180° piston ported two stroke twin was of unit construction and had alloy head and alloy barrels with cast iron liners. The T200's bore and stroke were 50 mm × 50 mm (2.0 in × 2.0 in) giving a displacement of 196 cc (12.0 cu in). The engine had a compression of 7:1. Claimed power output was 23 bhp (17 kW) @ 7,500 rpm, giving the machine a top speed of 85 mph (137 km/h).

Fuel was delivered by twin 22 mm Mikuni carburettors. The engine was lubricated by an improved version of the Suzuki Posi Force system which injected oil to the main bearings, conrod journals and cylinder bores.

Primary drive was by helical gears to a multi-plate wet clutch and five speed gearbox. Chain drive took power to the rear wheel.

=== Cycle parts ===
The duplex cradle frame was based on that of the T20 but was stiffer, leading to better handling. Rear suspension was by swinging arm with twin shock absorbers. At the front telescopic forks were used. Brakes were drums front and rear, the front being an effective 2ls item.

== TC200 ==
Suzuki also produced a 'Street Scramber' version of the bike, the TC200 Stingray. The machine had high level exhausts, one each side of the bike.
