= Suzuki T10 =

Two-stroke, twin-cylinder motorcycle

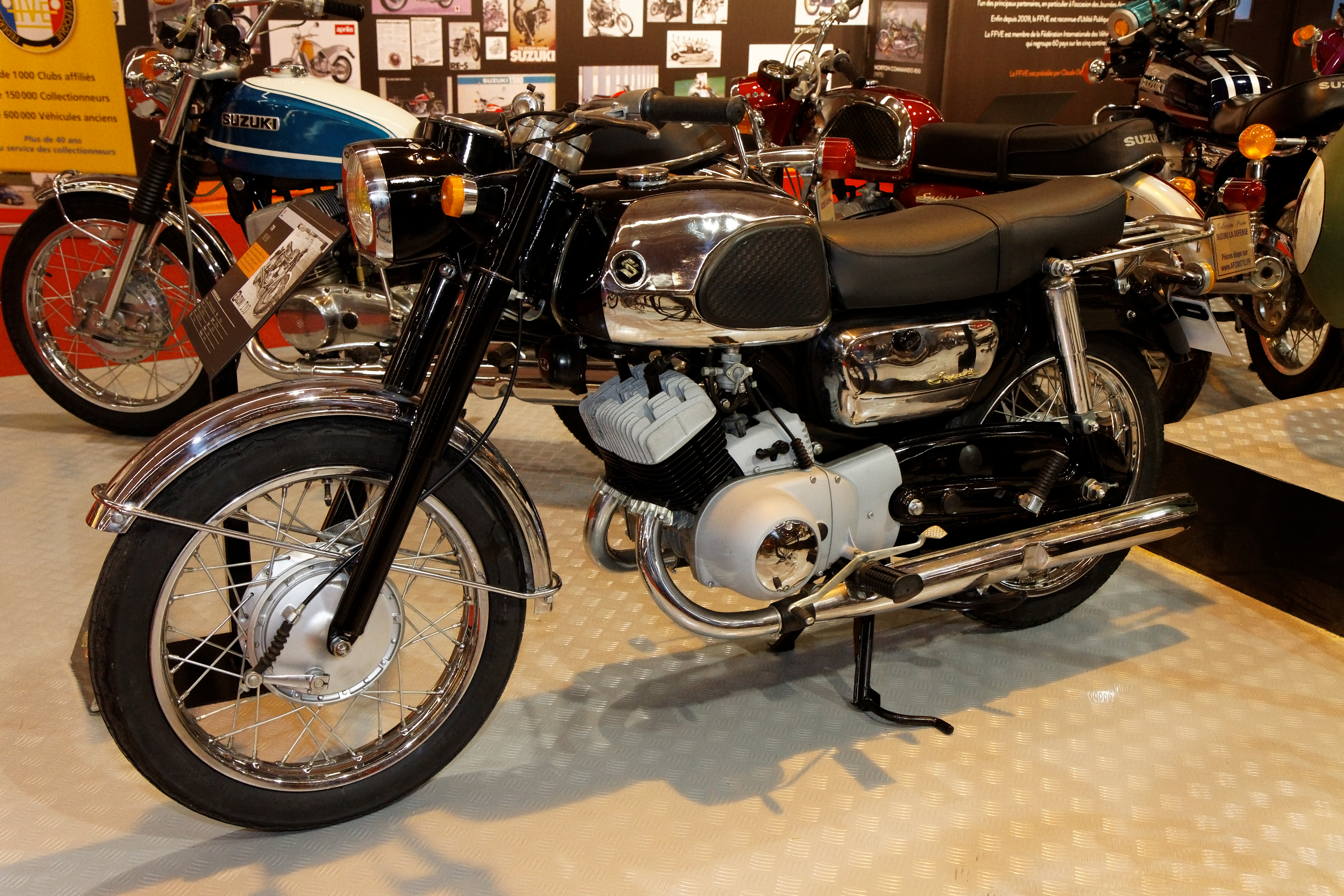
- A Suzuki T10 exhibited at the 2011 Paris Salon de la moto
- Manufacturer: Suzuki
- Also called: El Camino (US)
- Production: 1962-1967
- Predecessor: Suzuki Colleda TT
- Successor: Suzuki T20
- Class: Standard
- Engine: 246 cc (15.0 cu in) air-cooled two-stroke parallel twin
- Bore / stroke: 52 mm × 58 mm (2.0 in × 2.3 in)
- Compression ratio: 6.3:1
- Top speed: 140 km/h (87 mph) (Claimed)
- Power: 21 bhp (16 kW) @ 7,000 rpm
- Transmission: Multiplate wet clutch, 4 speed
- Frame type: Pressed steel
- Suspension: Front: telescopic forks Rear: swinging arm
- Brakes: Drum brakes
- Tyres: 300x17 front & rear
- Wheelbase: 1,350 mm (53 in)
- Dimensions: L: 2,065 mm (81.3 in); W: 800 mm (31 in); H: 1,050 mm (41 in)
- Weight: 140 kg (310 lb) (dry)
- Fuel capacity: 10 L (2.2 imp gal; 2.6 US gal)

The Suzuki T10 is a 246 cc (15.0 cu in), two-stroke, twin-cylinder motorcycle produced by the Japanese Suzuki company between 1962 and 1967. The model was based on the earlier Colleda TT and had an improved frame. It was marketed as the El Camino in the US and was Suzuki's first twin to be sold in America.

== Technical details ==
=== Engine and transmission ===
The engine of the T10 was a development of the earlier Colleda TT, which had been introduced in 1956. The 180° piston ported two stroke twin was of unit construction and had cast iron barrels and an alloy head. Bore and stroke were 52 mm × 58 mm (2.0 in × 2.3 in) and the claimed power output was 21 bhp (16 kW) @ 7,000 rpm.

Ignition was by twin coils with points mounted on the end of the crankshaft. Power to the 12v battery was supplied by a flywheel generator and the machine was fitted with an electric start. Fuel was delivered by twin 20 mm Mikuni Carburettors.

Primary drive was by helical gears to a multi-plate wet clutch. The four speed sequential gearbox used a 'rotating shift' mechanism; 'changing up' from top (4th) gear took the gearbox back to neutral. This was intended to reduce footwork when riding in traffic. Chain drive took power to the rear wheel and the chain was fully enclosed to protect it from road dirt.

=== Cycle parts ===
A new frame was designed for the T10 which was of a pressed steel beam design. The engine hung from the beam with no frame parts coming down in front of the engine. Rear suspension was by swinging arm with twin shock absorbers. At the front telescopic forks were used.

Brakes were drums front and rear, the front being operated by cable and the rear by hydraulics. The spoked wheels were both fitted with 300 x 17 tyres.

A 10 L (2.2 imp gal; 2.6 US gal) petrol tank was fitted, which had a clear plastic pipe running up the front to show the fuel level, and a dual seat.
