= Classic Racing =

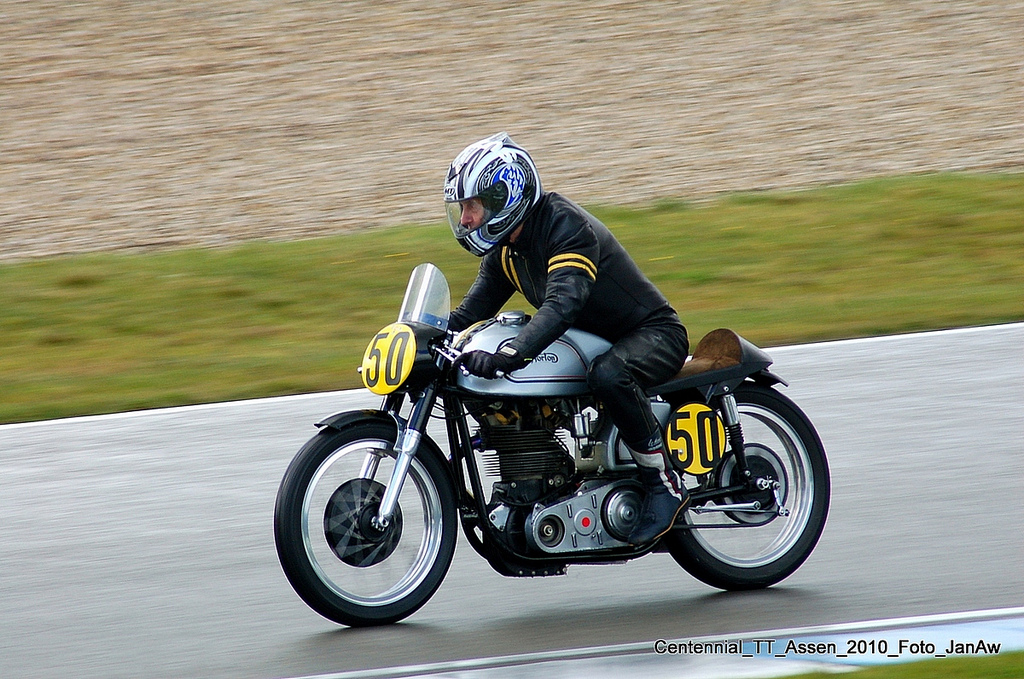
Theo Louwes on Norton Manx

The term Classic Racing in the United Kingdom is generally accepted as motorcycle racing as defined under the rules and or auspices of the Classic Racing Motorcycle Club (CRMC). This was established in 1981 and mostly caters for solos and sidecars manufactured in the period 1945–1972.

NG Road Racing hosts the official ACU National Post Classic 250 / 350 Championship catering for two-stroke Grand Prix machines of the 1970s to early ’80s. NG Road Racing took over the class from GP Originals in 2025.

Motorcycles from an earlier era, including a Pre-1935 class, are raced by the Vintage Motor Cycle Club (VMCC). The VMCC race classes are mostly for Pre-1963 bikes.

== The Mountain Circuit-'Manx Grand Prix' ==
The Manx Grand Prix, held on the Isle of Man, is considered by Classic racers worldwide as the ultimate classic racing event. This involves three or more laps around the famous 37 ¾ mile long 'Mountain' circuit. The Manx GP is traditionally held at the end of August.

== Classic Racing around the world ==
The Lansdowne Classic Series hosts the official British Championship for pre-1964 Grand Prix 500cc machines, their other classes serve 350 and 500 machines of the period with various modification regulations. The Lansdowne enjoys a unique link to the Goodwood Revival and the Barry Sheene Memorial Trophy race.

GP Originals began in 2017 and was inspired by the Hailwood Trophy race at the Goodwood Members Meeting. Typical machines are Yamaha TZ250 and TZ350 but other marques including the Harley Davidson RR250 and Rotax feature. This class has now moved across to NG Road Racing who are established as the central home of two-stroke Grand Prix motorcycle racing in the UK, the Club now hosts all three ACU National Championship titles.

The International Historic Racing Organisation has been running for over 20 years and organises high level competition for classic racing motorcycles around Europe

In the United States Classic Racing is organised by the American Historic Racing Motorcycle Association (AHRMA) who organise Classic Racing events for all types of Classic bikes.

Classic Racing Australia is a non-profit organisation, formed in August 2000, which was designed to keep Classic Motorcycle Racing alive and well in Australia.
