= Suzuki T90 =

Two-stroke, twin-cylinder motorcycle

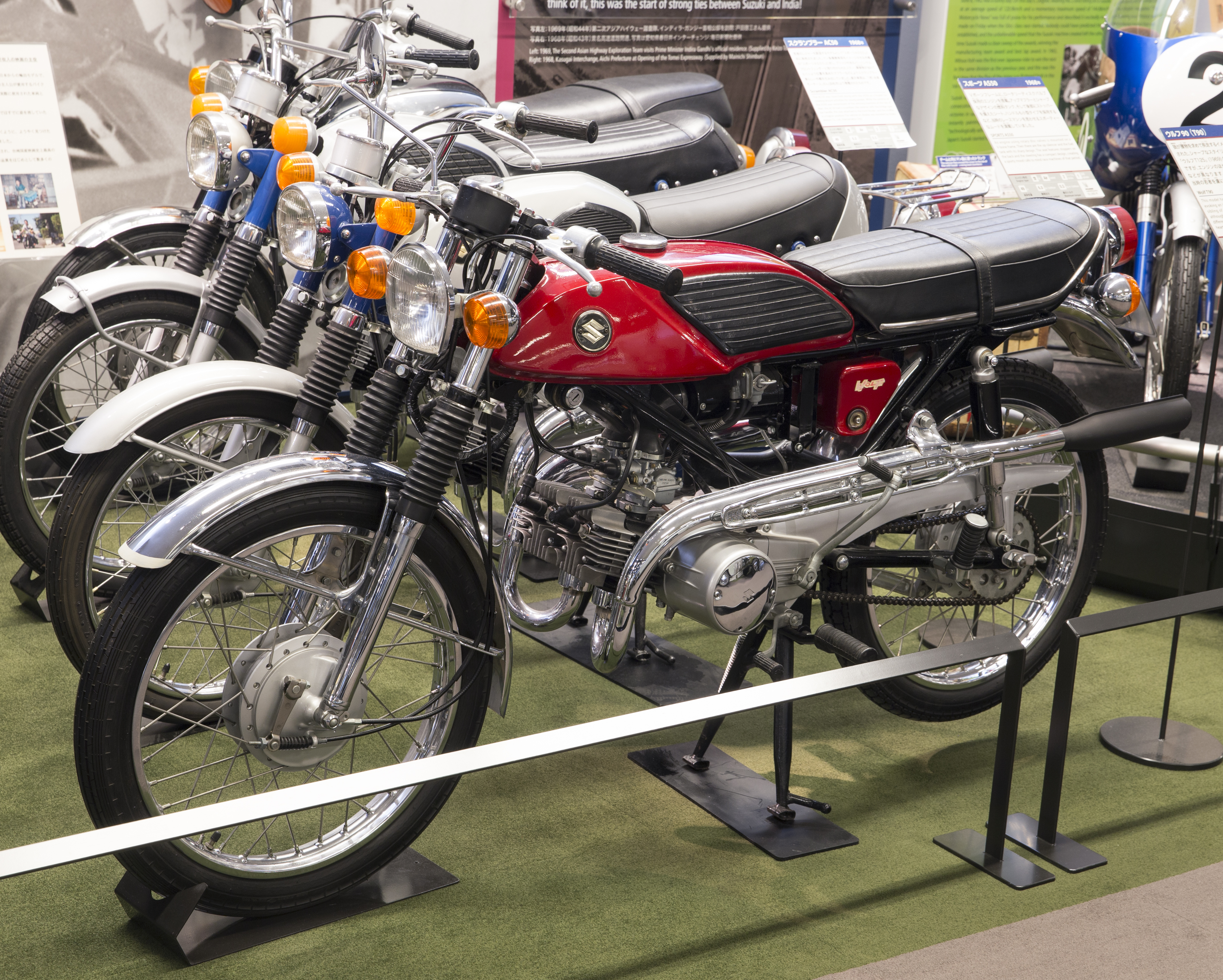
- 1969 Suzuki Wolf T90
- Manufacturer: Suzuki
- Also called: Suzuki Wolf
- Production: 1969-1972
- Class: Standard
- Engine: 89 cc (5.4 cu in) air-cooled two-stroke parallel twin
- Bore / stroke: 38 mm × 39.6 mm (1.50 in × 1.56 in)
- Compression ratio: 7:1
- Top speed: 68 mph (109 km/h)
- Power: 10.5 bhp (7.8 kW) @ 9,000 rpm
- Transmission: Multiplate wet clutch, 5 speed
- Frame type: Triform spine
- Suspension: Front: telescopic forks Rear: swinging arm
- Brakes: Drum brakes front & rear
- Tyres: Front: 250x18 Rear: 300x18
- Wheelbase: 1,200 mm (47 in)
- Weight: 90 kg (200 lb) (dry)

The Suzuki T90, also known as the Suzuki Wolf, is a 89 cc (5.4 cu in), two-stroke, twin-cylinder motorcycle produced by the Japanese Suzuki company between 1969 and 1972.The T90 was radically styled and except for the engine size, the model was the same as the Suzuki T125.

== Technical details ==
=== Engine and transmission ===
The T90's engine was a 180° piston ported two stroke twin of unit construction and had alloy head and cast iron barrels with the cylinders sloped forward almost to the horizontal. The engine had a bore and stroke of 38 mm × 39.6 mm (1.50 in × 1.56 in) and a compression ratio of 7:1. Claimed power output was 10.5 bhp (7.8 kW) @ 9,000 rpm, giving the machine a top speed of 68 mph (109 km/h). Fuel was delivered by twin carburetors.

Primary drive was by helical gears to a multi-plate wet clutch and five speed gearbox. Chain drive took power to the rear wheel.

=== Cycle parts ===
The spine frame of the T90 was shared with the T125 and TC120 and called the Triform by Suzuki. Rear suspension was by swinging arm with twin shock absorbers. At the front telescopic forks were used. Brakes were drums front and rear. Spoked wheels were fitted with 250x18 front and 275x18 tyres rear.

A high level exhaust was fitted on both sides of the bike.
