= Suzuki T125 =

Two-stroke, twin-cylinder motorcycle

Suzuki T125 (1967-68)
- Manufacturer: Suzuki
- Production: 1967-1968
- Class: Standard
- Engine: 124 cc (7.6 cu in) air-cooled two-stroke parallel twin
- Transmission: Multiplate wet clutch, 6 speed
- Frame type: Duplex cradle
- Suspension: Front: telescopic forks Rear: swinging arm
- Brakes: Drum brakes
- Wheelbase: 1,285 mm (50.6 in)
- Weight: 127 kg (280 lb) (dry)

Suzuki T125 was the designation given to two different models of 124 cc (7.6 cu in), two-stroke, twin-cylinder motorcycles produced by the Japanese Suzuki company between 1967 and 1971. The first shared the layout and styling of the 250 cc T20 and was produced in 1967 and '68. The second was more a more radical design that shared many parts with the smaller T90 and was produced from 1969 - '71.

== T125 (1967-68) ==
The original T125 followed the lines of the T20 and the rest of the Suzuki T range. The model was primarily sold in Japan.

The 180° piston ported two stroke twin engine was of unit construction and had alloy head and barrels. Transmission was by multi-plate wet clutch to a five speed gearbox. Chain drive took power to the rear wheel.

A duplex cradle frame was used. Rear suspension was by swinging arm with twin shock absorbers. At the front telescopic forks were used.

== T125 (1969-71) ==
Suzuki T125 (1969-1971)
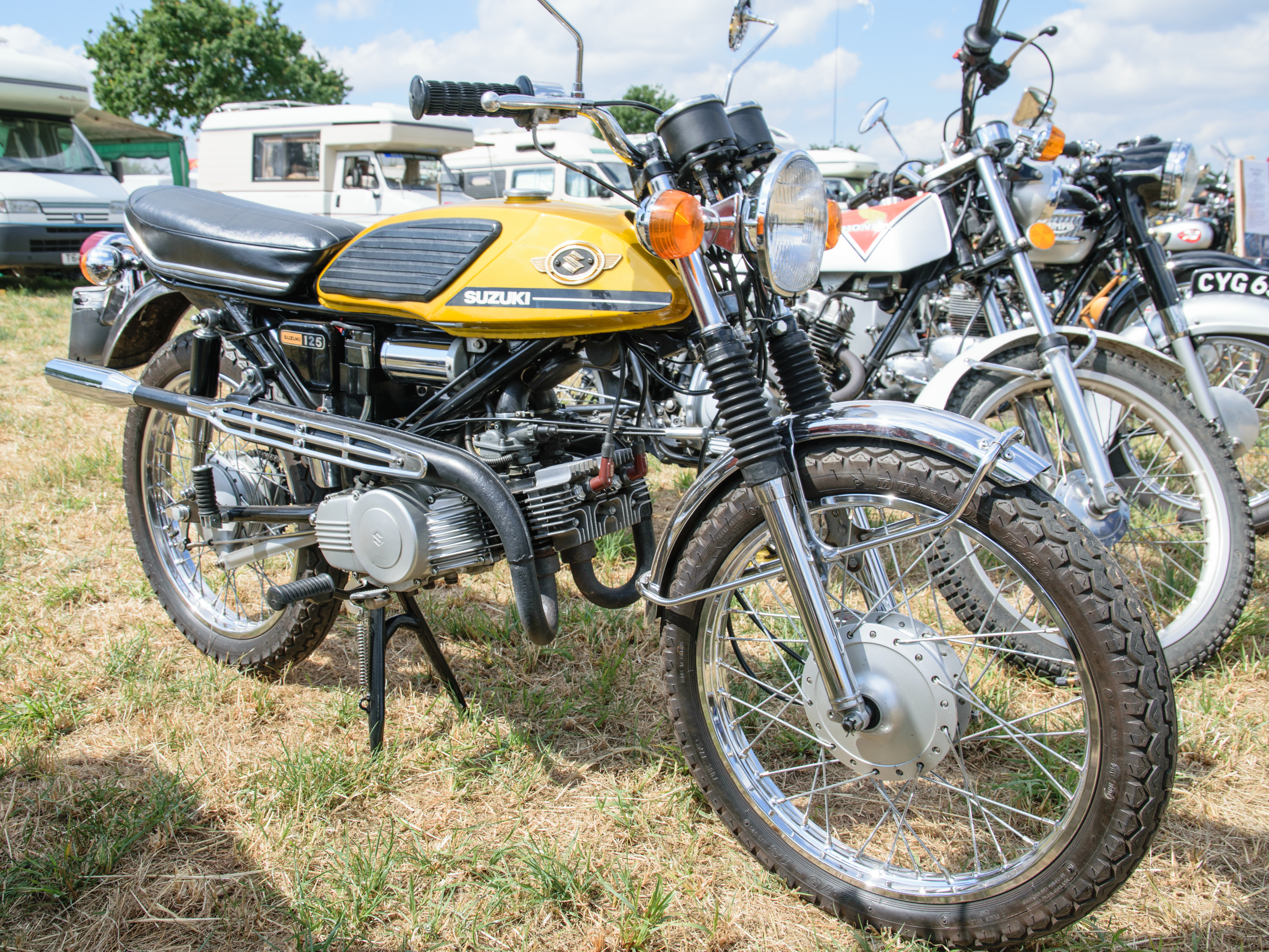
- Suzuki T125 Stinger
- Manufacturer: Suzuki
- Also called: Suzuki Stinger; Suzuki Wolf; Suzuki Flying Leopard
- Production: 1969-1972
- Engine: 124 cc (7.6 cu in) air-cooled two-stroke parallel twin
- Bore / stroke: 43.2 mm × 43.2 mm (1.70 in × 1.70 in)
- Compression ratio: 7.3:1
- Top speed: 81 mph (130 km/h)
- Power: 15 bhp (11 kW) @ 8,500 rpm
- Transmission: Multiplate wet clutch, 5 speed
- Frame type: Trellis
- Suspension: Front: telescopic forks Rear: swinging arm
- Brakes: Drum brakes front & rear
- Tyres: Front: 300x18 Rear: 325x18
- Wheelbase: 1,191 mm (46.9 in)
- Dimensions: L: 1,834 mm (72.2 in); W: 790 mm (31 in)
- Seat height: 785 mm (30.9 in)
- Weight: 96 kg (212 lb) (dry)

The second version of the T125 was known as the Stinger in most markets, it was also marketed as the Wolf in Japan, New Zealand and parts of Australia. In the rest of Australia and France it was called the Flying Leopard. It was Suzuki's interpretation of the American 'canyon racer'. The bike was based around the space frame of the TC120 Tail Cat. The frame was called the Triform by Suzuki. As the frame had been designed for the Trail Cat's single cylinder engine, the wider twin engine would have been too wide to fit between the frame tubes. To overcome this, Suzuki slated the cylinders forward, almost horizontally, so they sat in front of the frame tubes. The model was also available with a 90 cc engine, the T90.

=== Technical details ===
==== Engine and transmission ====
The T125's engine was a 180° piston ported two stroke twin of unit construction and had alloy head and cast iron barrels with the cylinders sloped forward almost to the horizontal. The engine had a bore and stroke of 43.2 mm × 43.2 mm (1.70 in × 1.70 in) and a compression ratio of 7.3:1. Claimed power output was 15 bhp (11 kW) @ 8,500 rpm, giving the machine a top speed of 81 mph (130 km/h). Fuel was delivered by twin down-draught carburettors.

Primary drive was by helical gears to a multi-plate wet clutch and five speed gearbox. Chain drive took power to the rear wheel.

==== Cycle parts ====
The spine frame of the T125 was shared with the T90 and TC120 and called the Triform by Suzuki. Rear suspension was by swinging arm with twin shock absorbers. At the front telescopic forks were used. Brakes were drums front and rear. Spoked wheels were fitted with 300x18 front and 325x18 tyres rear.

A high level exhaust, effectively an expansion chamber, was fitted on both sides of the bike, although in some markets low level exhausts were fitted.

=== History ===
Launched in 1969, the Stinger was available in candy corporate blue or candy Roman red. It had chrome exhausts with black tail pieces. The Japanese home market model used a different tank to the export models.

The bike was updated to Mark II in 1970 and was finished in candy Aztec gold or solid pop green. In America it was also available in pholina yellow. Exhausts were black with chrome tails. In some markets, mostly southeast Asia, the Mk II was fitted with low level exhausts.

A T125R version was available in some markets in 1971, although the Mk II continued in production. The R variant was finished in candy morrow green. It used the petrol tank previously used on the Japanese domestic models and had a longer, diamond patterned seat.
