= Suzuki T305 =

Two-stroke, twin-cylinder motorcycle

- Manufacturer: Suzuki
- Also called: Suzuki Raider
- Production: 1968-1969
- Successor: Suzuki T350
- Class: Standard
- Engine: 305 cc (18.6 cu in) air-cooled two-stroke parallel twin
- Bore / stroke: 60 mm × 54 mm (2.4 in × 2.1 in)
- Compression ratio: 6.7:1
- Top speed: 95 mph (153 km/h)
- Power: 37 bhp (28 kW) @ 7,500 rpm
- Transmission: Multiplate wet clutch, 6 speed
- Frame type: Duplex cradle
- Suspension: Front: telescopic forks Rear: swinging arm
- Brakes: Front: 180 mm (7.1 in) 2ls drum Rear: 180 mm (7.1 in) drum
- Tyres: Front: 300x18 Rear: 325x18

The Suzuki T305, also known as the Suzuki Raider, is a 305 cc (18.6 cu in), two-stroke, twin-cylinder motorcycle produced by the Japanese Suzuki company between 1968 and 1969. The model was based T20 and used an enlarged version of the T20 engine. The model was superseded by the 315 cc T350 in 1970.

== Technical details ==
=== Engine and transmission ===
The T305's engine was a development of the T20, which had been introduced in 1966. The 180° piston ported two stroke twin was of unit construction and had alloy head and alloy barrels with cast iron liners. The T20's bore was increased 6mm to 60 mm (2.4 in) whilst the stroke remained at 54 mm (2.1 in) giving a displacement of 305 cc (18.6 cu in). The engine had the compression ratio reduced to 6.7:1 and heavier flywheels than the T20 to aid low speed tractability. Claimed power output was 37 bhp (28 kW) @ 7,500 rpm, giving the machine a top speed of 95 mph (153 km/h).

Fuel was delivered by twin 32 mm Mikuni carburettors. The engine was lubricated by the Suzuki Posi Force system which injected oil to the main bearings and conrod journals.

Primary drive was by helical gears to a multi-plate wet clutch, which had larger plates than the T20 to improve longevity. The six speed gearbox had larger gears than the T20 to improve reliability. Chain drive took power to the rear wheel.

=== Cycle parts ===
The duplex cradle frame of the T20 was retained. Rear suspension was by swinging arm with twin shock absorbers. At the front telescopic forks were used. Brakes were drums front and rear, the front being an effective 2ls item.

== TC305 ==
An off-road version of the bike was released in the US as the TC305 Laredo. This model had high level exhausts.
