= Suzuki GT550 =

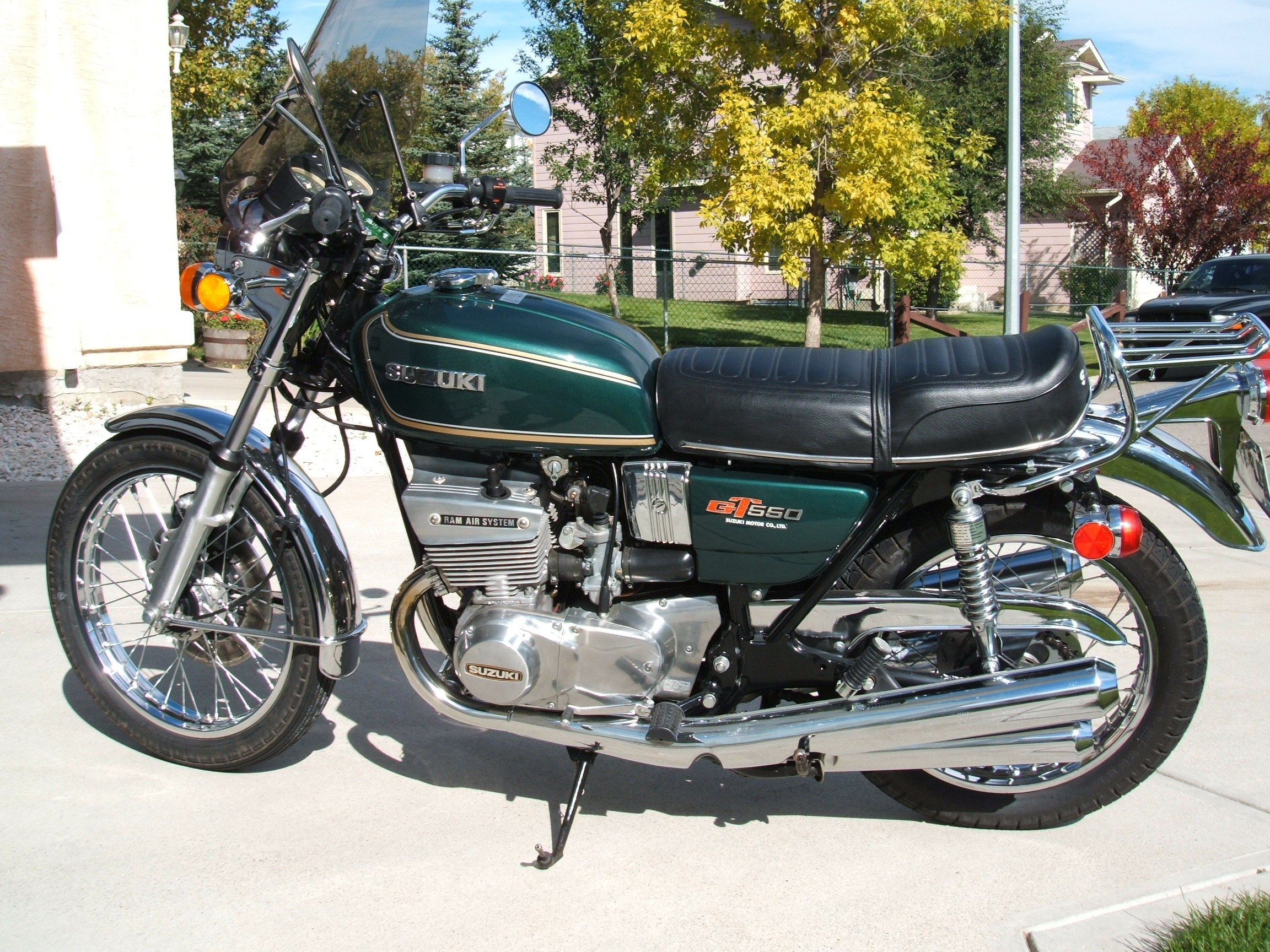
- Manufacturer: Suzuki
- Also called: Indy
- Class: Standard
- Engine: 543 cc (33.1 cu in) two-stroke triple
- Bore / stroke: 61 mm × 62 mm (2.4 in × 2.4 in)
- Compression ratio: 6.7:1
- Top speed: 177–185 km/h (110–115 mph) claimed
- Power: 37 kW (50 bhp) (claimed)
- Ignition type: Battery and coil
- Transmission: Multi-disc wet clutch, 5-speed, chain drive
- Frame type: Steel double cradle
- Suspension: Front: telescopic fork, rear: swingarm
- Brakes: Drum. Front: 300 mm × 51 mm (11.8 in × 2.0 in), rear: 182 mm × 28 mm (7.18 in × 1.12 in) Starting with 1973 K model, front brake was a hydraulically operated single disk type with 290mm (11.4") diameter rotor
- Tyres: Front: 3.25-19, rear: 4.00-18 both bias ply tube type
- Wheelbase: 1,460 mm (57.5 in)
- Dimensions: W: 740 mm (29.0 in)
- Seat height: 800 mm (31.5 in)
- Weight: 211 kg (465.146 lb) (wet)
- Fuel capacity: 15 L; 3.3 imp gal (4.0 US gal)
- Fuel consumption: 6.5–5.3 L/100 km; 43–53 mpg_{‑imp} (36–44 mpg_{‑US})

The Suzuki GT550 is a three cylinder, two-stroke, air-cooled 1970s-era motorcycle in Suzuki's "Grand Touring" GT series. Three Grand Touring models including the GT380 and GT750 and were originally offered for sale with the beginning of the 1972 model year (MY) with the 550 called "Indy" for the North American market. In Suzuki's numbering scheme, automobile race tracks identify each of its 3-cylinder GT bikes for the North America market: Sebring for the 380, Indy for the 550 and Le Mans for the 750.

== Ram air system ==
The 550 (and the 380) have a ram-air cooling system for the one-piece cylinder head. Two-stroke engines lose power after the engine reaches its critical temperature, so Suzuki used a system from its 500 cc two stroke twin cylinder racer, the T500. This system consisted of a two-piece aluminum shroud bolted to the cylinder head to duct ambient air over the cylinder head finning. The centre part of the head had an increased fin area and a larger shroud entry area in an effort to keep the centre cylinder running at the same temperature as the naturally more exposed outboard cylinders.

== Visible emissions control ==
Suzuki Recycle Injection System (SRIS) was an attempt by the manufacturer to reduce visible emissions from a two stroke motorcycle. The SRIS consisted of a small check valve in the bottom of each crank chamber along with various lengths of elastomeric tubing to the transfer ports of adjacent cylinders. See the attached diagram for a graphic depiction of the system. Two stroke engines have a tendency to collect unburnt oil and fuel in the bottom of the crank chamber at idle. Upon acceleration, after a period of idling, the unburned oil and fuel gets sucked up the transfer ports and contributes to an overrich mixture for the first 5 to 10 seconds resulting in a smokescreen from the exhaust. The SRIS plumbing routed the unburned fuel and oil to the next cylinder in the firing order thus allowing it to mix more thoroughly with the incoming charge of that cylinder and lowering the production of visible smoke. Overall fuel and oil consumption was unchanged but visible smoke was greatly reduced on sudden acceleration from rest.

== Exhaust system ==
The exhaust itself was unusual for the time in that the centre exhaust header was split in two and exited into two mufflers much smaller than the single mufflers supplied for the two outboard cylinders. This gave a bike a balanced look with two mufflers per side. The header pipes were all joined via balance tubes, known as Exhaust Coupler Tube System (ECTS), to increase low end torque. This exhaust was continued through to the end of production for the North American market but was dropped from the M model onwards in some other markets.

== Automatic oil/fuel mixing ==
Suzuki began using automatic lubrication in 1966 to eliminate premixing of oil and fuel as had been the norm for all two strokes up until then. This system was launched to eliminate mixtures with far too much oil due to the operator's unnecessary effort to preclude engine seizures. The 550 had the latest version of this multipoint oil injection called Crankcase Cylinder Injection (CCI).

== Undersquare engine ==
The 550 was designed to be suited as a touring motorcycle with its long wheelbase and unstressed torquey engine. The engine will pull quite easily from ~3,500 RPM. The smaller bore/longer stroke dimensions allow quick burning of the air fuel mixture, allowing the use of regular grade fuel. This type of undersquare engine configuration has long since been discarded for use in four stroke street bikes by most Japanese motorcycle engine designers due to its inherent limitations on power increases and the recent advances in combustion chamber design allowing the use of large bore cylinders and high compression without detonation issues. However, this was a very common design feature for two stroke motorcycles of the era.

== Model year changes ==
=== 1972 J model ===
The GT550 introductory model was Suzuki's counter to the Kawasaki H1 Mach III. The GT550 had a massive four leading shoe double panel drum front brake shared with the GT750. The conventional telescopic front forks had rubber gaiters covering the fork stanchions. Both fenders were chromed steel. Chrome and polished aluminum were used on the rest of the bike. The fuel cap was, unusually for the times, lockable and this was carried on through to the end of production. The rear turn signal lenses were red. Engine cooling was by the Ram Air system. First year sales were 11,000+ units.

=== 1973 K model ===
A single hydraulically operated front disc brake was added in 1973. Otherwise the bike was the same as the previous model, excepting the annual paint scheme change.

Both the wheel and the other fork leg were capable of accepting another disc and caliper and a switch to a twin-disc front brake (like the GT750) was not an uncommon modification some owners made (although the larger master cylinder from the 750 was required). The single disc arrangement continued throughout the rest of the GT550's production.

The brake light operated only by the rear brake in the UK market. A switch was available as a spare part to fit onto the front brake master cylinder casting which would also operate the brake light. The necessary wiring was already included on the main wiring harness in the headlamp shell. Sales were 14,000+ in 1973.

=== 1974 L model ===
The rubber-gaiters were replaced by a cleaned up "Ceriani-style" set of forks. A touted benefit was better engine cooling but, with ram air, this was a non-issue for the most part. The three separate carburetors were replaced by three unitized rack mounted carburetors with a push-pull cable arrangement. The benefits of this were less costly carburetor balancing and more accurate fuel metering. The handlebar mounted cable operated choke was gone, replaced by a lever mounted directly on the left hand side of the carb rack. Curiously, only 2 enricheners were used leaving the right hand cylinder without one. The cylinder head and the ram air shroud were redesigned to cater for this new carb setup.

A new airbox and filter assembly had bright chrome end caps and filter servicing was easier. The frame side covers were all new as well to blend in with the lines of the airbox end caps. The chain guard was chromed steel instead of black plastic.

The instrument cluster still contained the speedometer and tachometer but a single digit LED gear indicator was added. It was in the centre of the instrument panel showing gear numbers 1 through 5 in a bright red colour. The neutral light indicator was retained as a separate item. Sales were 10,000+.

=== 1975 M model ===
In 1975, various external and internal parts of the fork were changed, the engine was re-tuned to 53 hp now with chrome bores plated directly onto the alloy barrels and the bike was heavily restyled. This type of styling ran through to the model end in 1977 with only minor changes. Problems with the starter clutch engaging while riding and thus locking up the engine were solved with the substitution of a Borg-Warner style starter clutch installed under warranty. This style of starter clutch was standard equipment on all later models. The Exhaust Coupler Tube System (ECTS) link between the exhaust pipes disappeared in some markets outside of North America. The North American area kept the exhaust coupler tubes and older engine tune of 50HP with cast iron cylinder liners through to the end of production. Available in Green in UK. This MY sales were 14,000+.

=== 1976 A model ===
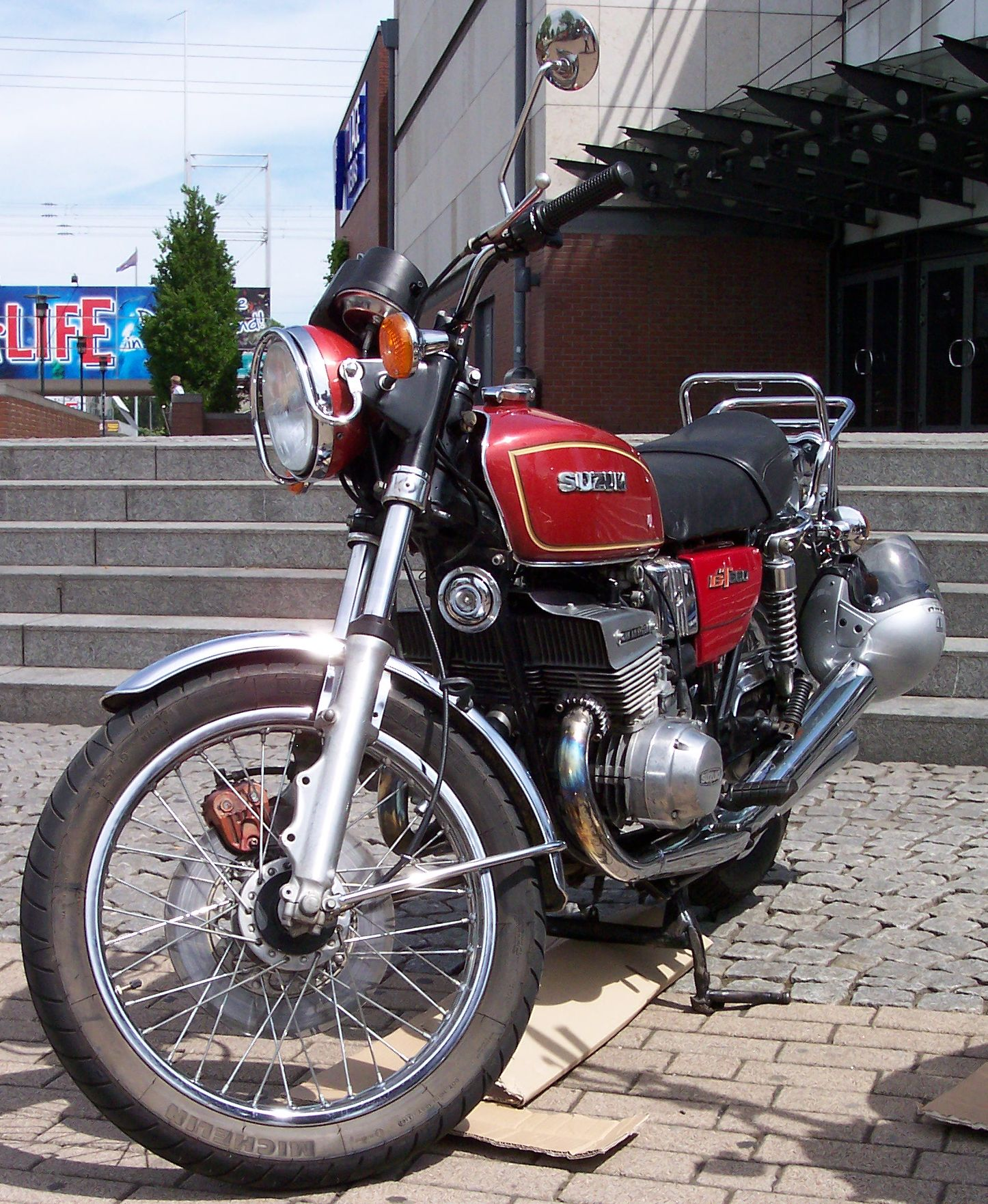
Ram air cooling shroud on top of the cylinder head

In 1976 the front mudguard stay was removed. Petrol Tank Graphics swooped up at the front. Available in Red and Black. The rear shocks were stiffened. The gear indicator changed to LED segments rather than the previous dot matrix. Clock surround rubber changed from light to dark with a darker background to the clock faces This MY sales were 9,000+.

=== 1977 B model ===
The faces of the speedometer and tachometer were changed from a blue background to brown to match the appearance of the instruments on the GS models. There was also a change in the plastic used as lens because it no longer developed serious opacity and cracks after long exposure to sunlight. The instruments did not get the then-unique rose-colored backlighting that the GS models had. The front brake caliper was changed to a pivoting unit made by Asco rather than the fixed Tokico caliper that had been supplied from the introduction of the disc brake system. Rear light changed to GS style, Satin black side panels and GS style indicators.

The GT and GS series were sold side by side during this one year overlap. This was the last MY for GT550 production. This MY sales were ~6,000+ making this the rarest of all the 550 models.

== Reception ==
A January 1973 Cycle World road test said the GT-550K Indy was a good compromise between the GT750 Watercooled and the GT380, with substantial enough weight and size for to long-distance touring with a passenger, and being only just light enough and narrow enough, with a 150 mm (5.8 in) ground clearance for "deft canyon road maneuvering or hustling through traffic". They tested the bike's top speed at 158 km/h (98 mph) and acceleration at 0 to 60 mph (0 to 97 km/h) in 5.8 seconds or 0 to 1/4 mile (0.00 to 0.40 km) in 14.59 seconds at 87.8 mph (141.3 km/h). Braking from 60 to 0 mph (97 to 0 km/h) was tested at 112.5 ft (34.3 m).
