= Suzuki GT series =

Range of 1970s Japanese motorcycles

1973 GT750K in Pearl Red and Tan showing the water-jacketed engine, coolant radiator and dual-sided disc front brake

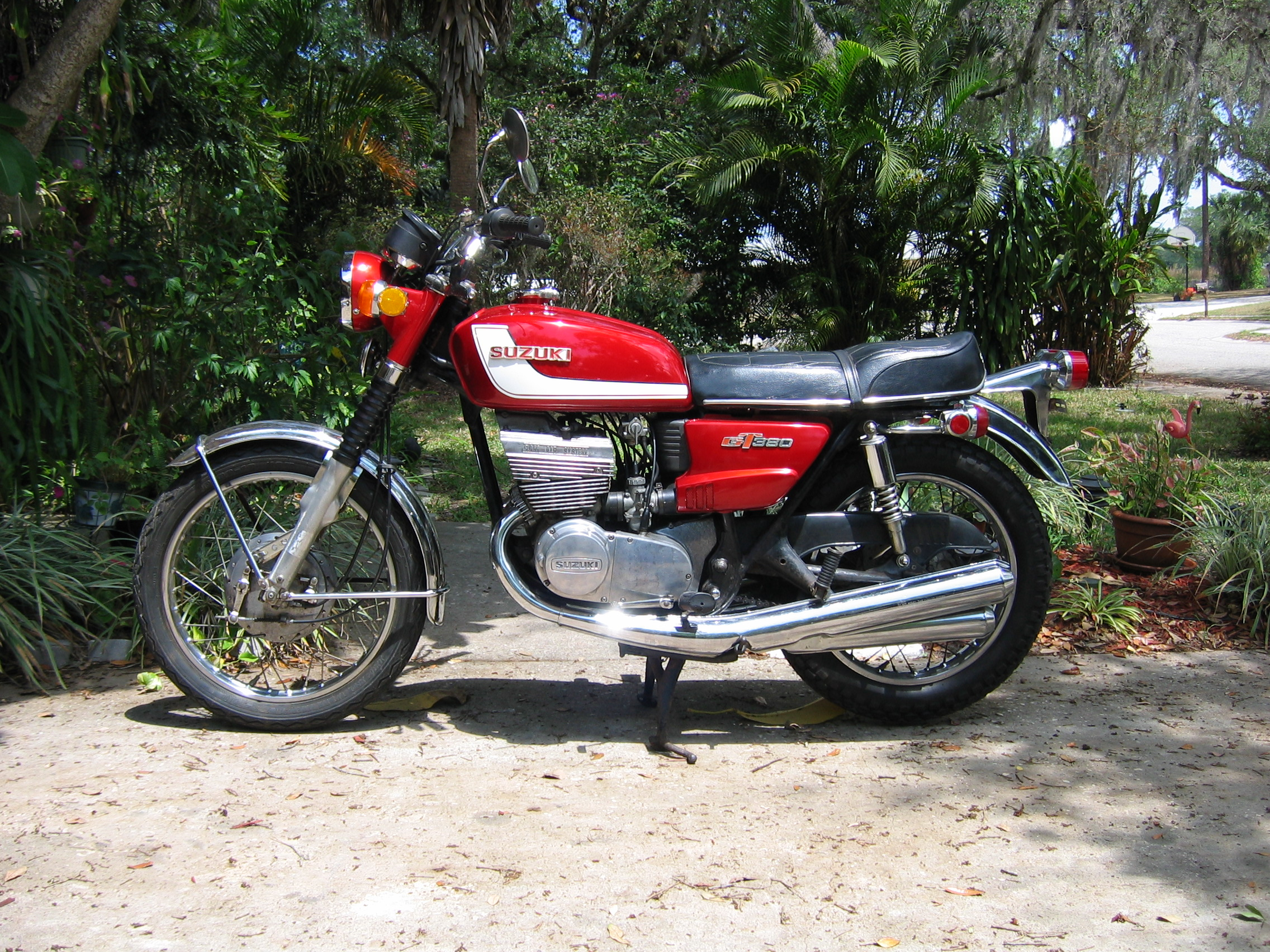
1972 GT380J in Roman Red and Egret White with front drum brake

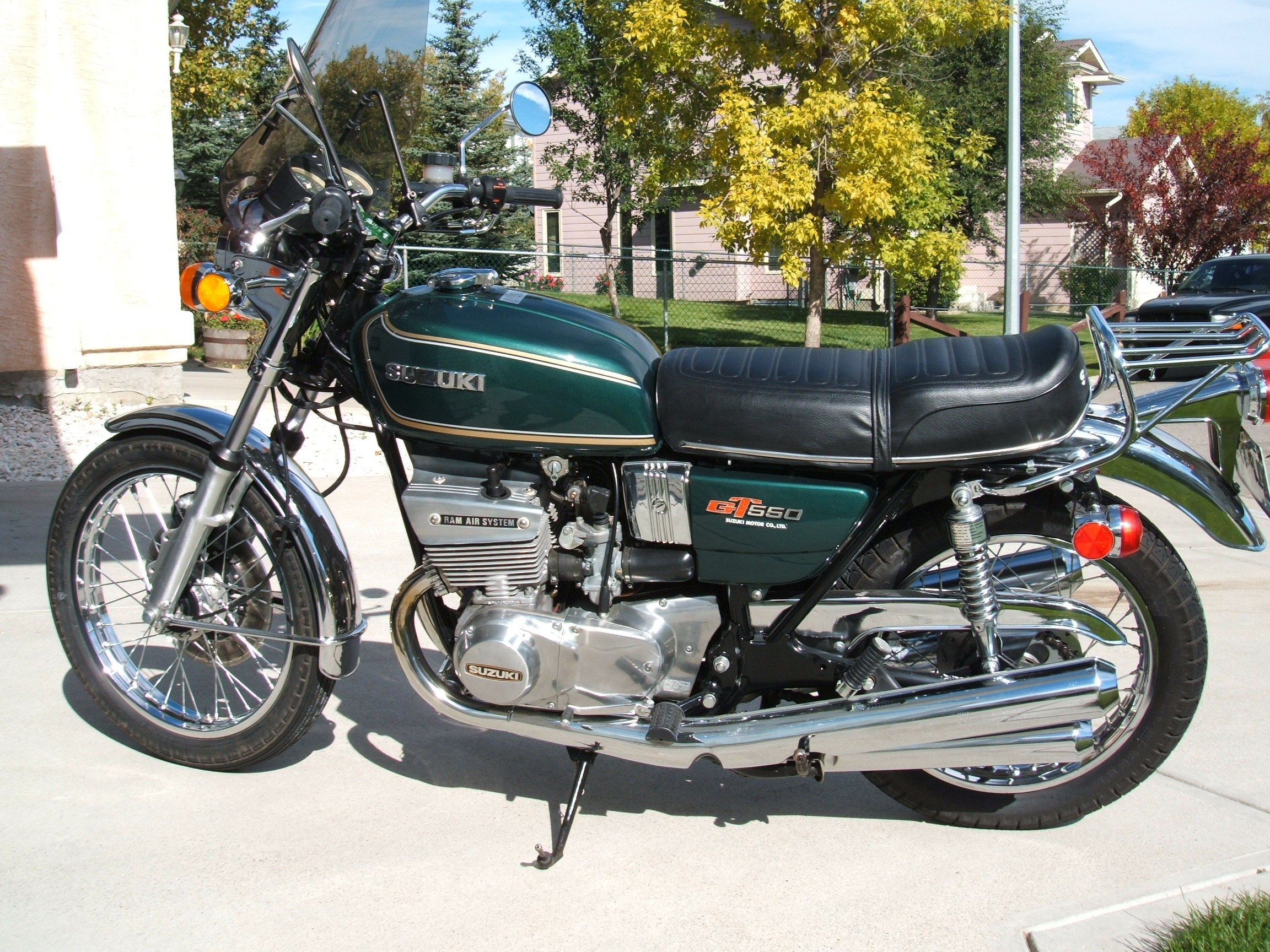
1976 GT550A in Forest Green metallic with optional factory parcel rack, showing 'Ram Air' cooling shroud on top of the cylinder head

The GT series is a series of two-stroke chain drive motorcycles manufactured and marketed by Suzuki for model years 1972–1977, with a range of engine capacities and cylinder counts. Certain markets received the GT380 until model year 1980.

== GT380, GT550, GT750 ==
The initial lineup consisted of the GT380 three cylinder (marketed in North America as "Sebring"); GT550 three cylinder (marketed in North America as "Indy") and GT750 three cylinder (marketed in North America as "LeMans")

=== Engines ===
Engines were piston-ported two-stroke with Suzuki's multi-point oil injection system, marketed as Crankcase Cylinder Injection (CCI) (previously marketed as PosiForce), conventional battery/points ignition system and chain-type final drive. The motorcycles featured engines with Schnuerle porting. Alternators featured a three-phase excited field type using brushes and slip rings with a wound rotor. A solid-state rectifier and a mechanical three-step regulator completed the system. Previously Suzuki had primarily used a permanent-magnet single-phase alternator setup on its bikes so the new equipment was quite a step up for the GT series.

The 380 and 550 engines were air-cooled with a system marketed by Suzuki as Ram Air. This system consisted of a cast aluminum shroud covering a modified cylinder head to direct the cooling air.

The GT750 was liquid-cooled. Suzuki thus led the motorcycle world by being the first company to mass-produce a liquid-cooled, large-bore two-stroke engine. The GT750 was nicknamed the "Water Buffalo" in North America and the "Kettle" in the UK.

Other names were the "Wasserbüffel" in Germany, "la bouillotte" in France and the "Water Bottle" in Australia. "Water Gat" in Finland.

The 550 initially featured chrome-plated piston rings and cast iron cylinder bores. For the 1976 model year, the 550 received a system of cast-iron rings running in chrome-plated cylinder bores. This change was largely thanks to the RE5, which also used a proprietary cylinder wall plating similar to a Nikasil coating. The coating, marketed as Suzuki Composite Electro-chemical Material or SCEM, is nickel-phosphorus-silicon-carbide based, reducing weight (by eliminating a steel liner) and improving heat transfer, allowing for tighter and more efficient piston-to-cylinder clearance.

For model years 1972 and 1973 the carburetors had been three separate items with the complex cabling. 1974 models featured the unitized carburetors mounted to a single bracket with a less complex single push-pull cable arrangement for easier and more durable synchronization. The unitized carburetors continued through to the end of production of the three-cylinder models, when the GT750 received the Mikuni BS40 type diaphragm style carburetors. All smaller models featured Mikuni VM type round slide carburetors.

The three-cylinder GT models featured bifurcation of the center cylinder exhaust header. This allowed Suzuki to use four mufflers rather than an unbalanced "2 and 1" or a "three into two" exhaust arrangement.

The GT550 and GT750 featured electric starting while other models, with the exception of the GT185, were kick start only.

All models were equipped with five-speed transmissions with the exception of the GT250 and GT380 which had a six-speed, and all models were equipped with drum brakes front and rear. 1973 three-cylinder models were equipped with hydraulically operated single disc brakes on the front with drum brakes on the rear. The GT750 featured dual discs up front, another big "first" for Suzuki. Frames were all-welded mild steel tubing with long wheelbases to give stability at high speed.

=== GT380 for Italy ===
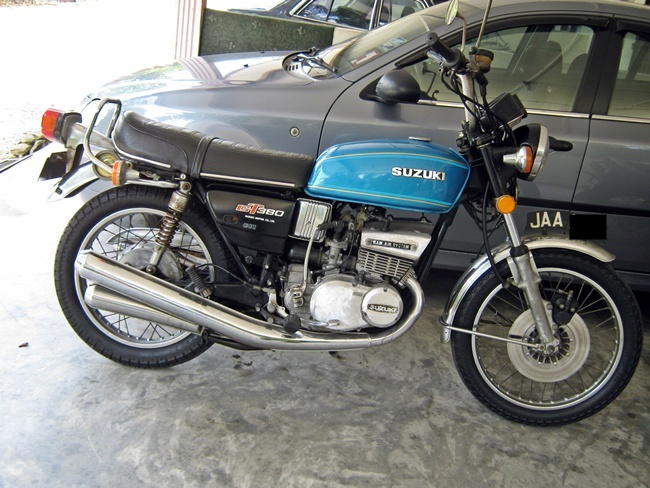
GT380 version produced for the Italian market

A marketing anomaly concerned the GT380. The actual engine displacement as introduced in the 1972 model year was 371cc and the 380 stayed this way until the end of production for most market areas. For the Italian market only, the GT380 received a displacement increase to 384cc starting with the 1975 model year. This engine size was continued through to the end of production for Italy alone. This was a counter to an Italian government import ban on bikes less than 380cc and less than 170 kg. Suzuki simply increased the bore of the GT380 to 55 mm, thus making the engine capacity now 384cc. Suzuki also made sure that the data plate riveted to the frame showed a weight of 171 kg.

== GT250 ==
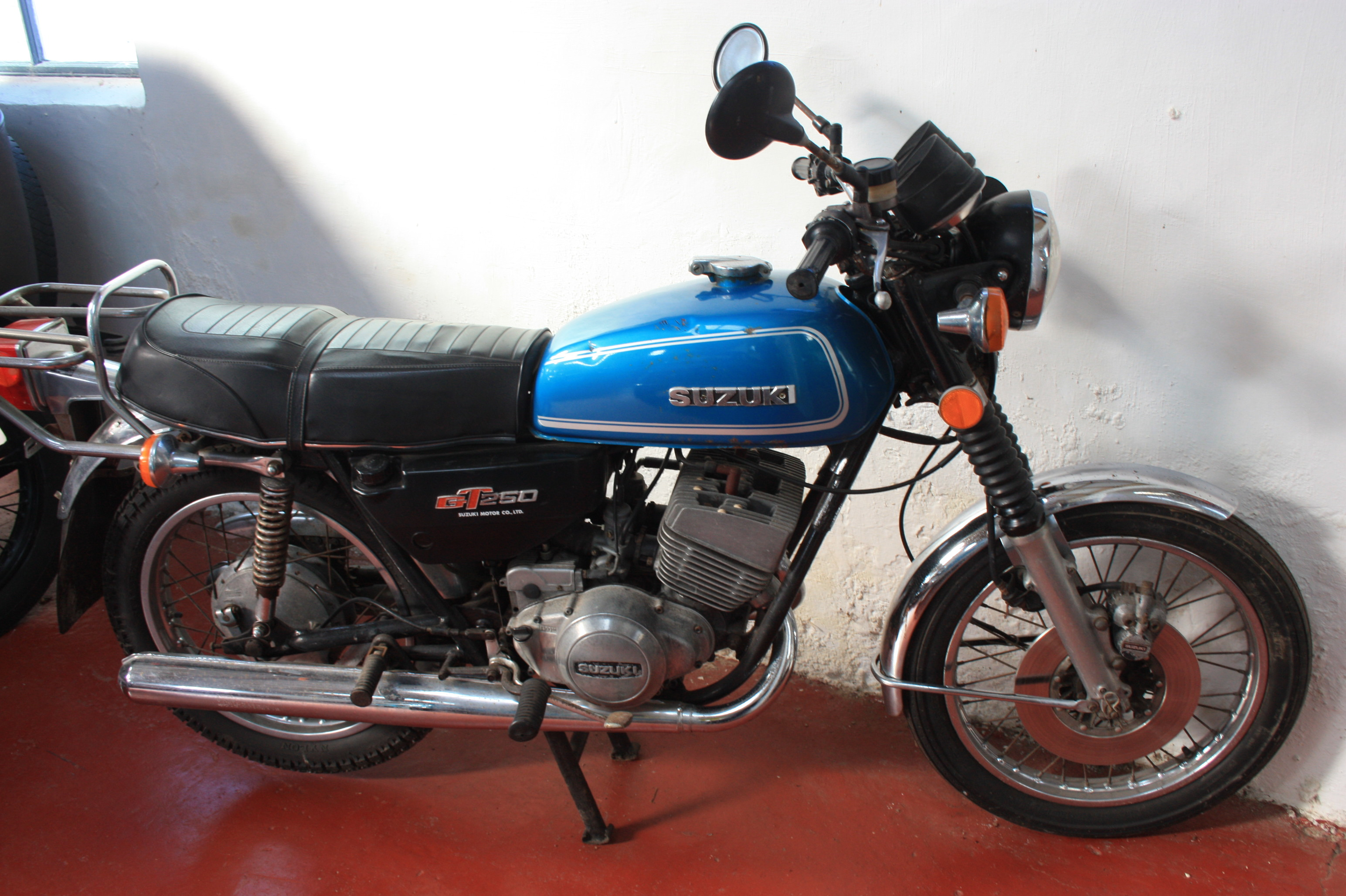
Suzuki GT250

For the 1973 model year, the T250 twin was updated with new bodywork, Ram Air cooling, a single disc brake in front and was now designated GT250. The GT250 retained its original engine and six-speed transmission, both remaining basically unchanged from the T20 X6 Hustler of 1966 through the T250 model to the 1972 model year. The marketing name of "Hustler" was retained for the North American market. The GT250 continued on with minor changes until the 1976 model year when the engine was changed substantially, both internally and externally. Porting changes now saw the cylinders with four larger transfer ports instead of the previous two small as well as changes to the CCI system in the crankshaft main bearing area. The carburetors became 28 mm in size instead of 26 mm, the mufflers were modified to cater for the increased airflow through the engine and the transmission ratios were revised to more evenly match the new powerband. The Ram Air cover for the head was deleted and the stock finning on the heads was increased in height to gain the same effect as the Ram Air used to give.

== GT185 ==
For model year 1973, Suzuki introduced the GT185 twin-cylinder model equipped with Ram Air cooling, drum brakes front and rear and a combination electric starter/generator setup – marketed in North America as the "Adventurer". For model year 1974, the GT185 gained a single-disc front brake to rationalize it with the other GT models. It then remained basically unchanged, except for colour and trim items (which included a tail fairing in the 1977 'B' model and cast wheels in the final year 1978 'EC' model), through to the end of production with the 1978 model year.

In some markets the GT185 became the RG185 and was sold with different trim.

The 1974 model had a fatal engine flaw that caused steel powder and eventually half of the transmission oil dipstick to drop into the transmission. The rubber stopper for the transmission oil fill hole allowed the dip stick to vibrate enough to contact the primary drive gear. If not caught within ~300 miles from new, the bearings in the transmission would be ruined.

== GT125 ==
The 1974 model year also saw Suzuki introduce the GT125 to the motorcycling world. This model was similar in layout to the GT185 but with a shorter wheelbase and smaller engine displacement so shared only a few common parts. The rest of this model's equipment followed that of the GT185. The electric starter was deleted, probably in the interests of economy, which allowed a more attractive selling price in the very competitive "beginner" market that this model competed in. This model continued basically unchanged, excepting colours and trim items (the 'B' model in 1977 got a tail fairing), until the end of production with the 1977 model year. Some markets received 1978 model year (the 'EC' which had tail fairing & cast wheels) & there were model year 1979 and model year 1980 versions of this model with the name changing to RG125 X4. The final GT125s were updated and sold with cast wheels and a tail fairing. Suzuki listed the RG125 X4 in their sales literature until 1980 in continental Europe.

== GT500 ==
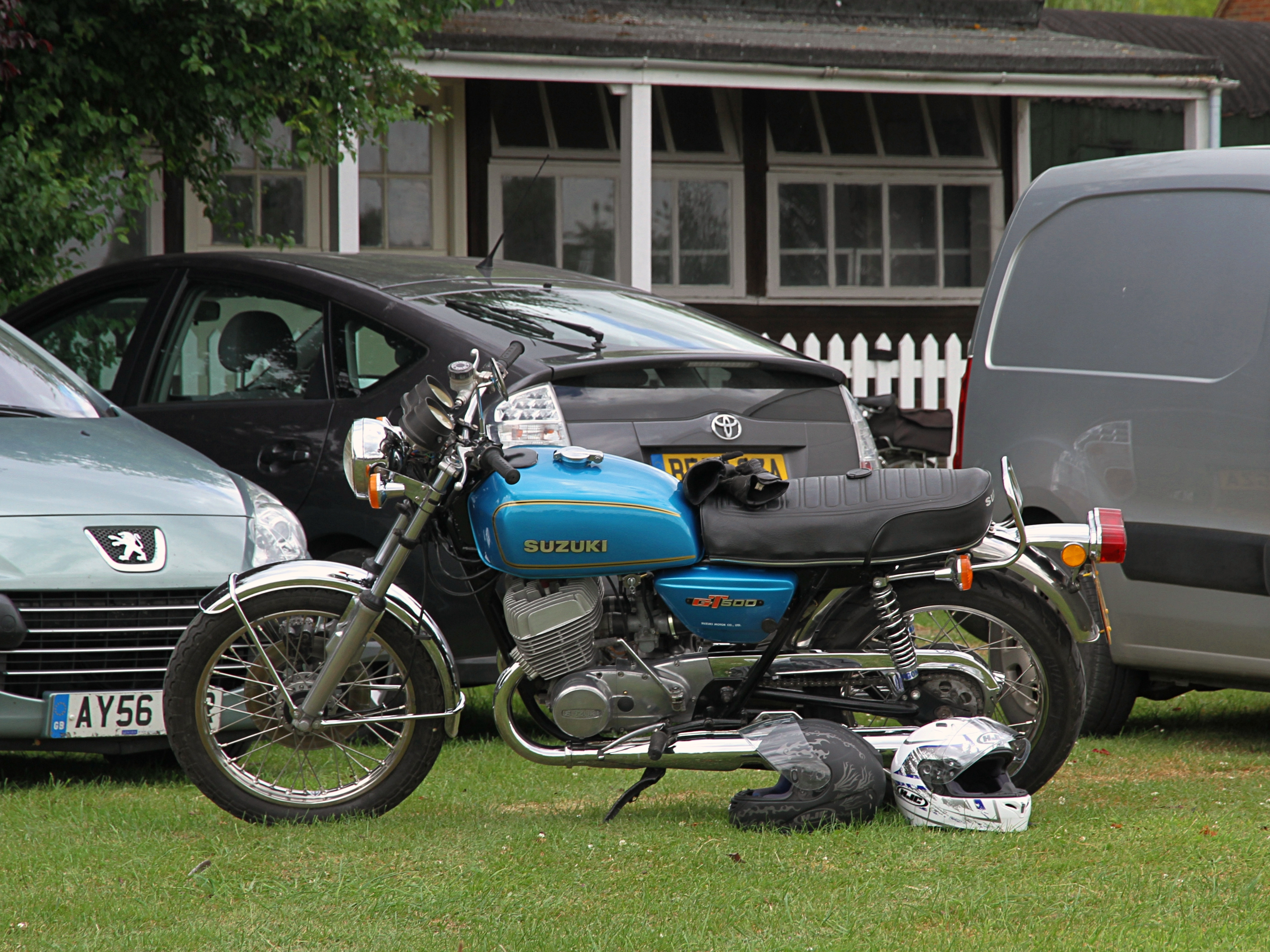
Suzuki GT500

For the 1976 model year, the aging two-cylinder T500 Titan was given a new front end with a single-disc brake as well as freshened up bodywork. It was henceforth known as the GT500. The GT500 was discontinued at the end of the 1977 model year, so had a very short production life. The GT500 did not have Ram Air cooling, probably because Suzuki already knew that their large-capacity two-stroke road bikes were reaching the end of their production lives. It was probably a way to get a few more sales dollars from what had now become a very dated design reaching back to the 1968 model year.

== GT350 ==
The T350 was marketed in the Japanese domestic market as the GT350 in 1971. To meet Japanese legislation, the power was reduced to 33.5 bhp (25.0 kW).

== Competition machines ==
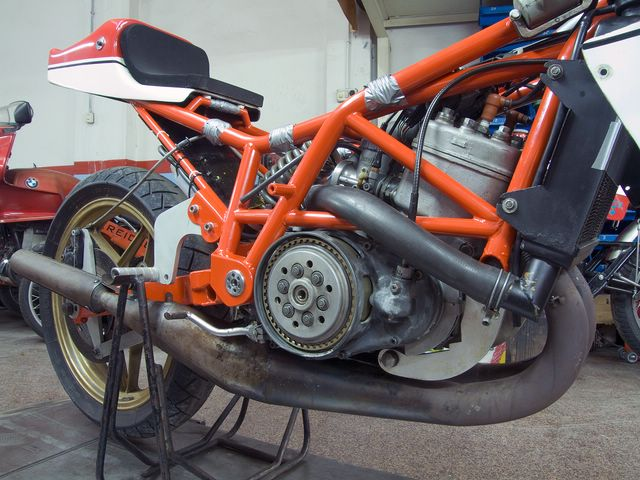
Suzuki TR500 water jacketed engine in a Bimota chassis

Suzuki went racing at various levels with modified GT750s and T500s. The factory Suzuki TR750 ultimately produced 115 bhp and was Suzuki's basis for the then-new F750 category including Daytona 200 participation, with contracted riders like Barry Sheene and Ron Grant.

Both the TR750 and TR500 models were famously campaigned by Barry Sheene who became inaugural F750 champion in 1973 and in 500 cc Grand Prix racing with factory-supported development-rider Jack Findlay. The TR500 was initially air-cooled becoming a water-cooled derivative producing 83 bhp.

== See also ==
- Suzuki GT750
- Suzuki GT550
