= Suzuki T350 =

Two-stroke, twin-cylinder motorcycle

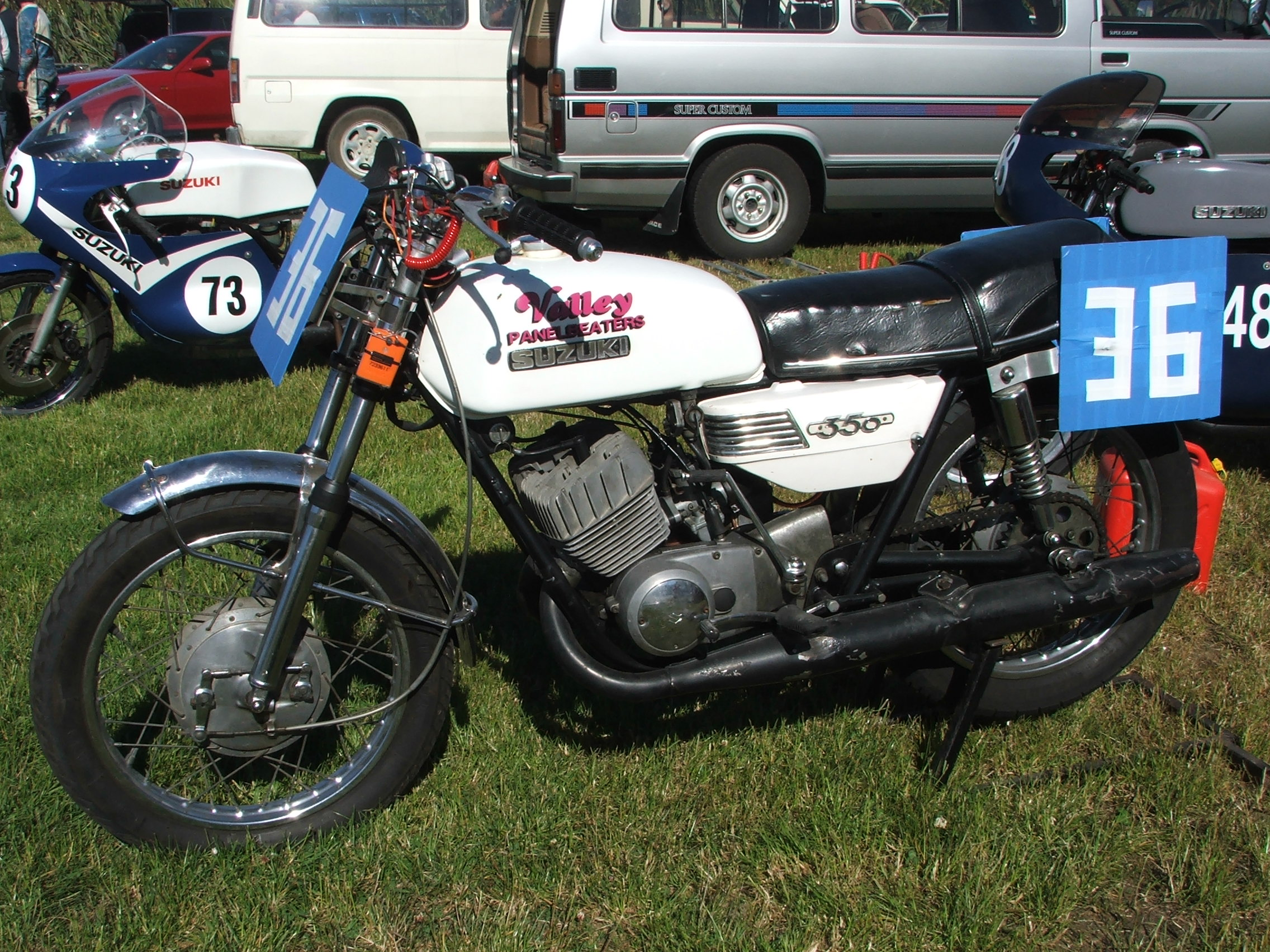
- Suzuki T350 in racing trim
- Manufacturer: Suzuki
- Also called: Suzuki Rebel
- Production: 1969-1972
- Predecessor: Suzuki T305
- Successor: Suzuki GT380
- Class: Standard
- Engine: 315 cc (19.2 cu in) air-cooled two-stroke parallel twin
- Bore / stroke: 61 mm × 54 mm (2.4 in × 2.1 in)
- Compression ratio: 6.7:1
- Top speed: 95 mph (153 km/h)
- Power: 39 bhp (29 kW) @ 7,500 rpm
- Transmission: Multiplate wet clutch, 6 speed
- Frame type: Duplex cradle
- Suspension: Front: telescopic forks Rear: swinging arm
- Brakes: Front: 180 mm (7.1 in) 2ls drum Rear: 180 mm (7.1 in) drum
- Tyres: Front: 300x18 Rear: 325x18
- Wheelbase: 1,295 mm (51.0 in)
- Weight: 147 kg (324 lb) (dry)

The Suzuki T350, also known as the Suzuki Rebel, is a 315 cc (19.2 cu in), two-stroke, twin-cylinder motorcycle produced by the Japanese Suzuki company between 1969 and 1972. The model was based T305 and used an enlarged version of the T305 engine, which itself was an enlargement of the T20 unit. It was the fastest production 350 at the time. In 1972 a T350 was overall winner of the Australian Castrol Six Hour Production race at Amaroo Park but was subsequently disqualified but the same bike won the 500cc class in 1973. The model was dropped when the T380 triple was introduced in 1972.

== Technical details ==
=== Engine and transmission ===
The T350's engine was an enlargement of the unit used in the T305, which had been introduced in 1968. The 180° piston ported two stroke twin was of unit construction and had alloy head and alloy barrels with cast iron liners. The T305's bore was increased 2mm to 62 mm (2.4 in) whilst the stroke remained at 54 mm (2.1 in) giving a displacement of 315 cc (19.2 cu in). The engine had a compression ratio of 6.9:1. From the 1971 model year T350R, finning on the cylinder head was diagonal to direct air over the combustion chambers. Claimed power output was 39 bhp (29 kW) @ 7,500 rpm, giving the machine a top speed of 95 mph (153 km/h).

Fuel was delivered by twin 32 mm Mikuni carburettors and engine was lubricated by the Suzuki Posi Force system which injected oil to the inlet ports and outer main and conrod journals. The centre main bearings were lubricated by the gearbox oil. Primary drive was by helical gears to a multi-plate wet clutch and six speed gearbox. Chain drive took power to the rear wheel.

=== Cycle parts ===
The duplex cradle frame of the T305 was retained. Rear suspension was by swinging arm with twin shock absorbers. At the front telescopic forks were used. Brakes were drums front and rear, the front being a 2ls item.

== GT350 ==
The model was marketed in the Japanese domestic market as the GT350 in 1971. To meet Japanese legislation, the power was reduced to 33.5 bhp (25.0 kW).
