= Suzuki T20 =

Two-stroke, twin-cylinder motorcycle

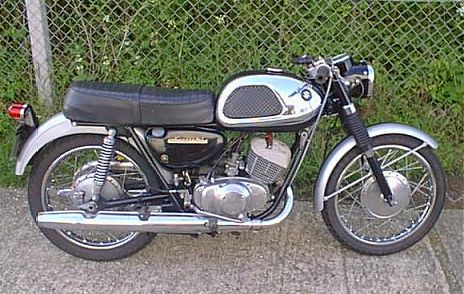
- Manufacturer: Suzuki
- Also called: Suzuki X6 (US); Suzuki Super Six (UK)
- Production: 1966-1968
- Predecessor: Suzuki T10
- Successor: Suzuki T250-1
- Engine: 247 cc (15.1 cu in) air-cooled two-stroke parallel twin
- Bore / stroke: 54 mm × 54 mm (2.1 in × 2.1 in)
- Top speed: 152 km/h (94 mph)
- Power: 29 hp @ 7500 rpm
- Transmission: 6-speed manual
- Weight: 138 kg (304 lb) (dry)
- Fuel capacity: 3.7 US gal.

The Suzuki T20 is a motorcycle with a 247 cc (15.1 cu in), two-stroke, twin-cylinder engine, and six speed gearbox. It was first manufactured in 1965 (but introduced as a 1966 model) and was produced until the end of the 1968 model year. Production peaked at more than 5000 units per month. It was superseded by an updated version which was designated the T250-1. In the United States, the bike was sold as the Hustler, a name also used by Suzuki for the Suzuki Hustler kei car since 2014.

== Marketing ==
In the UK the T20 was called the 'Super Six' which refers to its - at the time - very unusual six speed transmission. In that era most motorcycles had only four speeds or, rarely, five speeds. In the USA the bike was designated the X6 with the advertising department tacking on the "Hustler" name.

Advertising brochures produced by Suzuki listed the following features to be found on the new model:

- Claimed power of 29 hp
- Claimed weight of 135 kg (298 lb)
- Racing type double leading shoe 8 inch front brake
- Aluminium alloy twin cylinder engine
- Close ratio 6-speed transmission
- Twin 24 mm carburettors
- POSI-FORCE lubrication
- Air pump
- Scientifically designed quiet efficient mufflers
- Safe powerful 8 inch rear brake
- Wide type tail lamp
- Safe bright turn signal lamps
- 3 position adjustable shock absorbers
- Wide, comfortable dual seat
- 14-litre (3.7 US gal) gasoline tank
- Racing type throttle
- Easy-to-read tachometer and speedometer
- Sturdy oil damped telescopic front fork
- 12 volt fully approved lighting system

In the US, Suzuki first opened a showroom featuring the X6 Hustler in Santa Monica, CA (in late 1964 or early 1965) and shortly after (in June 1965) opened a second showroom (the first on the US east coast), named Cycle City, located in Newport News, Virginia.

== Posi-Force system ==
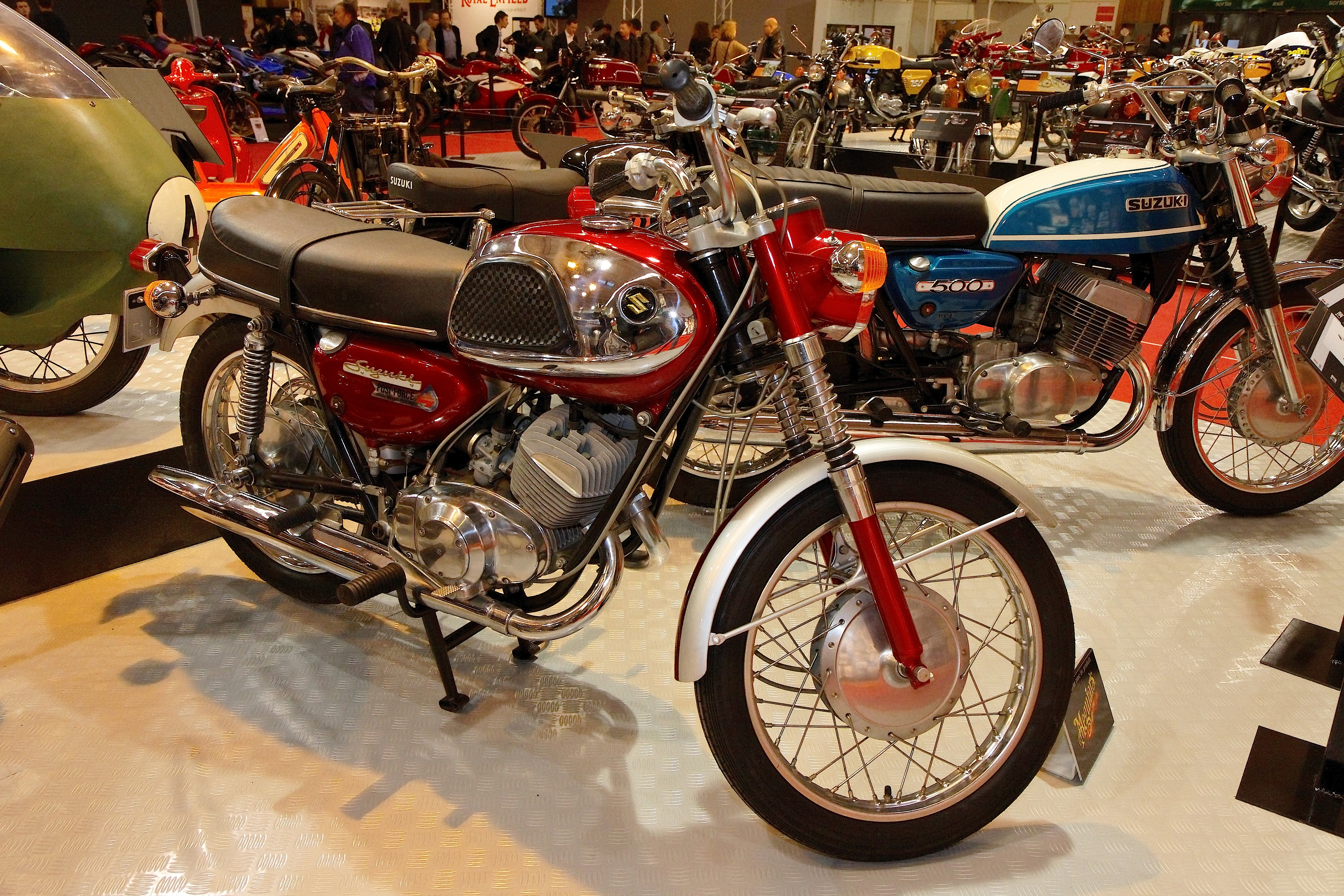
Suzuki T20 at Le Salon de la Moto 2011 in Paris

The T20 was equipped with a 247 cc two-stroke engine, which meant that oil needed to be mixed with gasoline prior to injection into the cylinder. Simple two-stroke designs simply achieved this by requiring the user to combine oil and gas together (a solution known as pre-mix) before filling the fuel tank. However, in an advanced system like the T20, which was expected to operate for longer periods at higher RPMs, this would have been unsuitable. An excess amount of oil would be burned using pre-mix under these conditions, resulting in reduced performance and dirtier emissions, which in turn would cause the exhaust system to become laden with deposits, further reducing performance.

The T20 solves this problem by incorporating a once-through oil injection system known as Posi-Force, which consists of an engine-driven oil pump coupled to the throttle, which is designed to provide the proper amount of oil needed at the current RPM and throttle opening. The pump draws clean oil from a separate oil tank, and pumps it through hoses into the crankcase, where it is injected into the engine outside main bearing(s) and big end rod bearings of the crankshaft. Suzuki improved upon the system by adding oil injection directly to the cylinders on newly introduced models starting in 1968 such as the T250, T305 and the T500. Suzuki would continue to use this system on many of their two-stroke motorcycle designs. Posi Force was renamed CCI (Crankcase-Cylinder-Injection) in the early 1970s and was used until the end of two stroke street bike production in the late 1990s.

== Racing ==
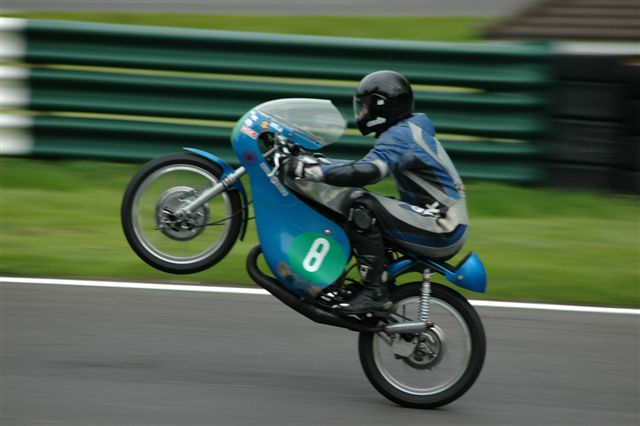
A T20 Suzuki racing in 2005

The T20 immediately had real success on the race course in the 1960s, and many are still used to this day in Classic Racing meetings around the world. The T20 has had notable success in the Manx Grand Prix and some riders have managed to lap the famous Isle of Man course at over 100 mph on heavily modified T20s.

== T21 ==
An updated version of the T20, the T21, was introduced in 1967, with 30.5 bhp (22.7 kW). It was known as the Super T21 in the US and the T250 in Japan.

== TC250 ==
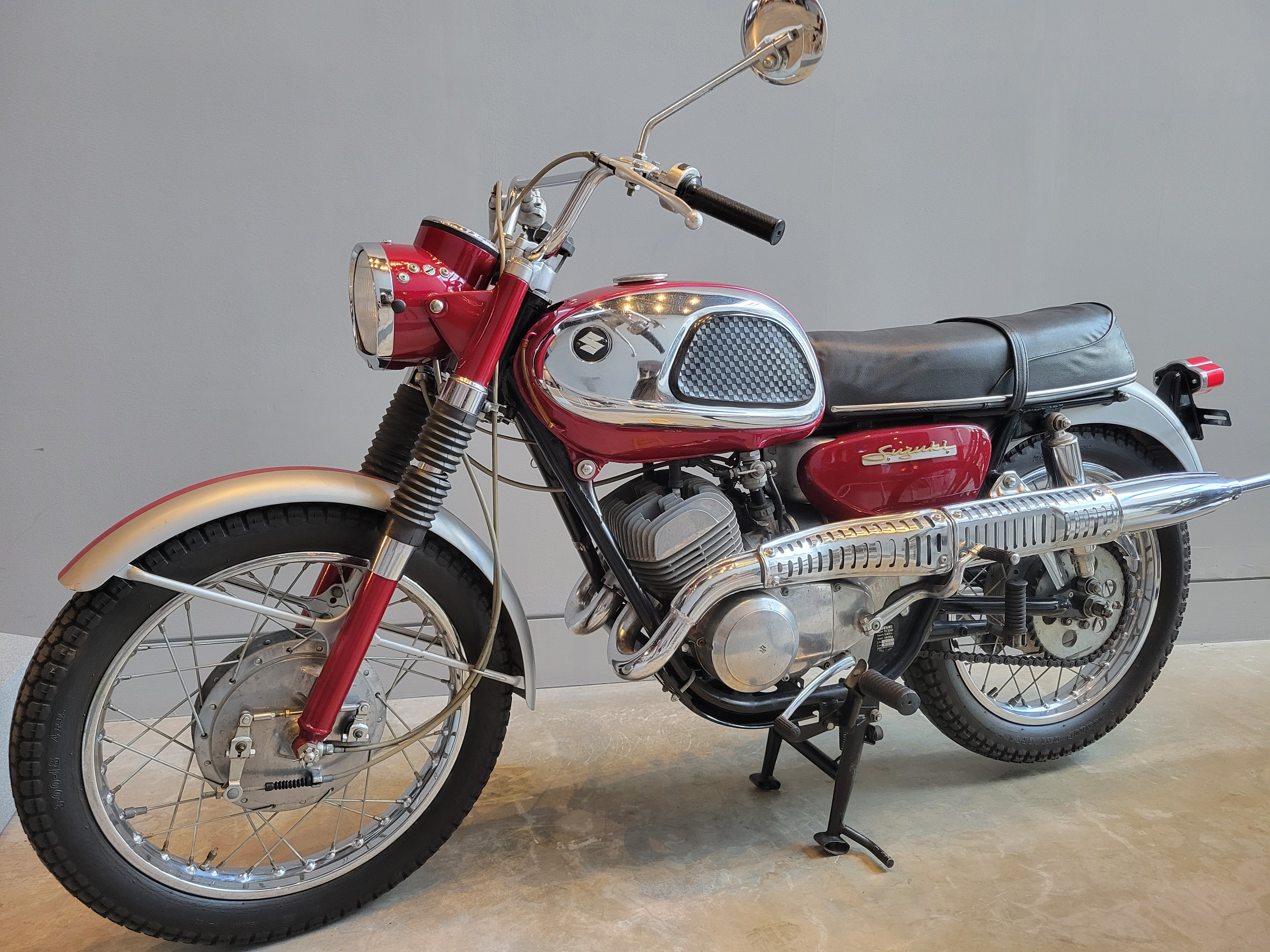
1967 Suzuki TC250 Scrambler (America on Wheels, Allentown, PA).

An off-road variant of the T20 was available from 1967 to 1968. It was equipped with high level exhausts. The version for the American market had a smaller tank and different seat.

== Revival ==
In 2013, Suzuki renewed the Hustler motorcycle trademark for Europe, leading to rumors of a retro style 250 twin in the works, or possibly a new sportbike.
