= Motorcycle racing =

Racing sport using motorcycles

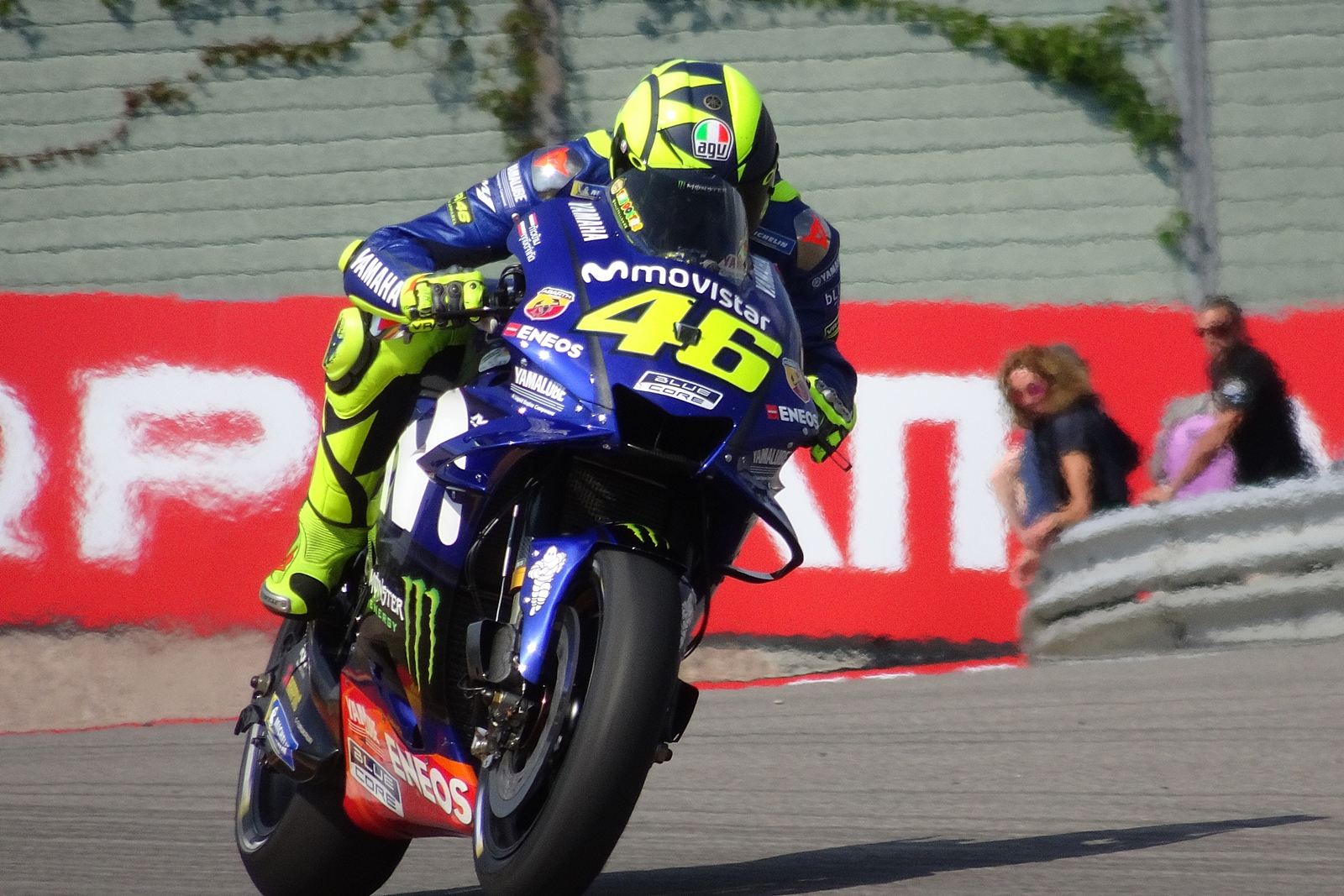
- 2018 German motorcycle Grand Prix; MotoGP class
- Highest governing body: FIM
- First played: November 29, 1895; 130 years ago

Characteristics
- Mixed-sex: Yes
- Type: Outdoor

Presence
- Olympic: No
- World Games: Motocross: 1985; Speedway: 1985 and 2017; Indoor trials 2005 (All invitational sports)

The motorcycle sport of racing (also called moto racing and motorbike racing) includes motorcycle road racing and off-road racing, both either on circuits or open courses, and track racing. Other categories include hill climbs, drag racing and land speed record trials.

== Overview of motorcycle racing by surface type ==
Motorcycle sports can generally be categorized according to the nature of the track surface. Today, circuit racing and drag racing are held on paved surfaces (asphalt, concrete), while track racing, motocross, enduro, cross country, trial, and hill climbing take place on unpaved surfaces (grass, sand, loose rock, ice, snow). Hill climbs and rallies often represent mixed formats. Within the individual sports, there is a wide variety of competition formats and class divisions.

Differentiation of motorcycle sports by track surface

Bound surface (Asphalt, concrete)	Unbound surface (Grass, sand, gravel, loose rock, ice, snow etc.)
Road racing	Track racing
Drag racing	Motocross
Enduro
Rally raid
Trial

== Categories ==
The FIM classifies motorcycle racing in the following four main categories. Each category has several subcategories.

=== Road racing ===
Road racing is a form of motorcycle racing held on paved road surfaces. The races can be held either on a purpose-built closed circuit or on a street circuit utilizing temporarily closed public roads.

==== Traditional road racing ====
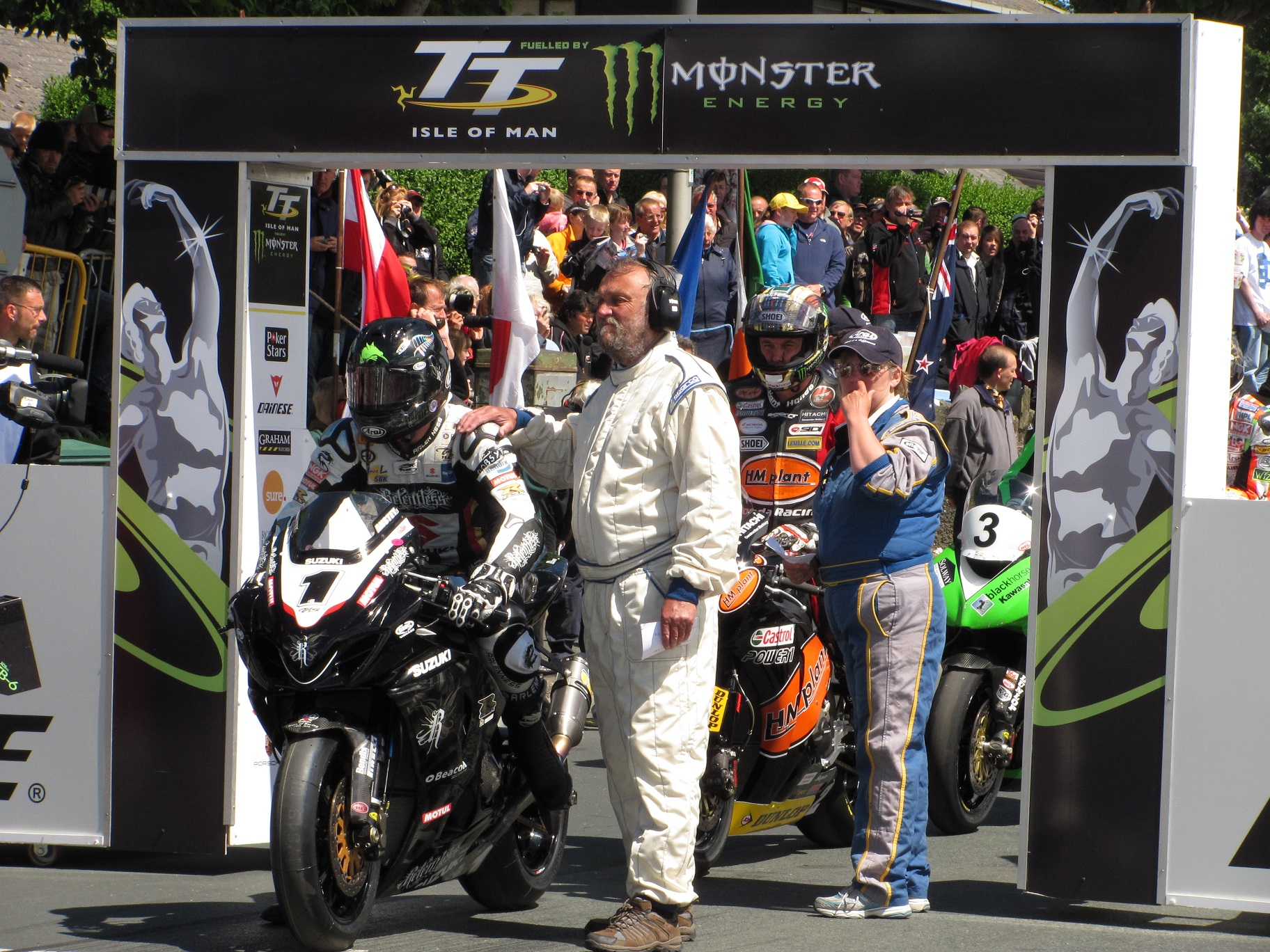
Competitors line up at the start of the 2010 Senior TT race. This form of road racing differs from others as it takes the form of an individual Time Trial, but other historic TT events have differed, using mass-grid starts and Le Mans starts

Historically, "road racing" meant a course on closed public roads. This was once commonplace but currently only a few such circuits have survived, mostly in Europe. Races take place on public roads which have been temporarily closed to the public by legal orders from the local legislature. Two championships exist, the first is the International Road Racing Championship, the other is the Duke Road Racing Rankings. The latter accounts for the majority of road races that take place each season, with an award for the highest placed rider. Prominent road races include the Isle of Man TT, North West 200, and Ulster Grand Prix on long circuits. Ireland has many road racing circuits still in use. Other countries with road races are the Netherlands, Finland, Spain, Belgium, Germany, Great Britain (Oliver's Mount), the Czech Republic, Ukraine, New Zealand, Thailand and Macau.

==== Motorcycle Grand Prix ====
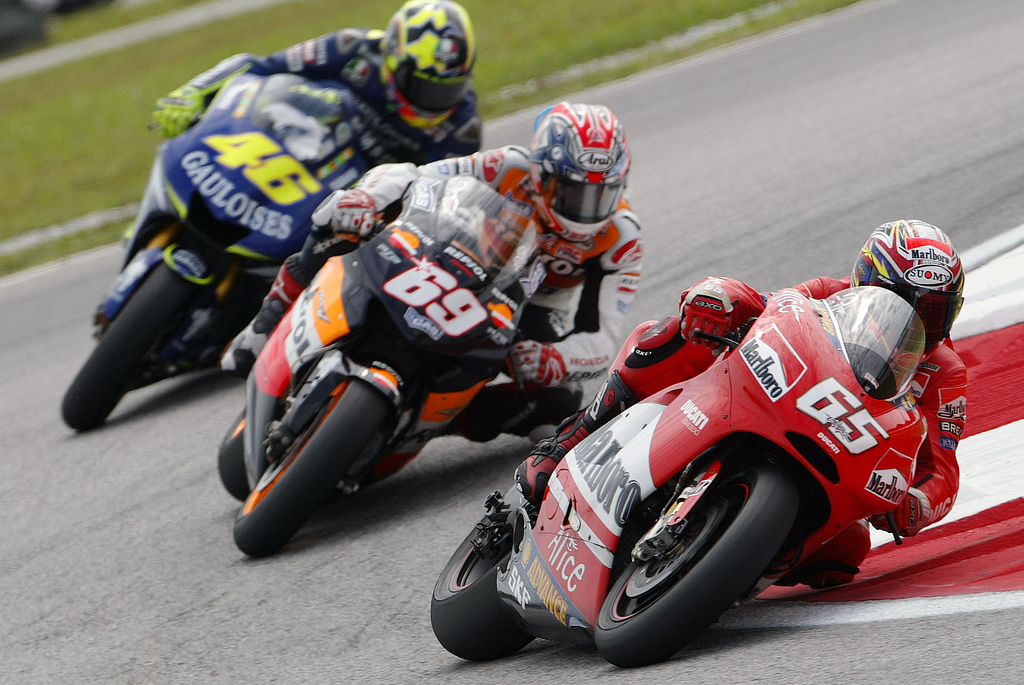
MotoGP racing

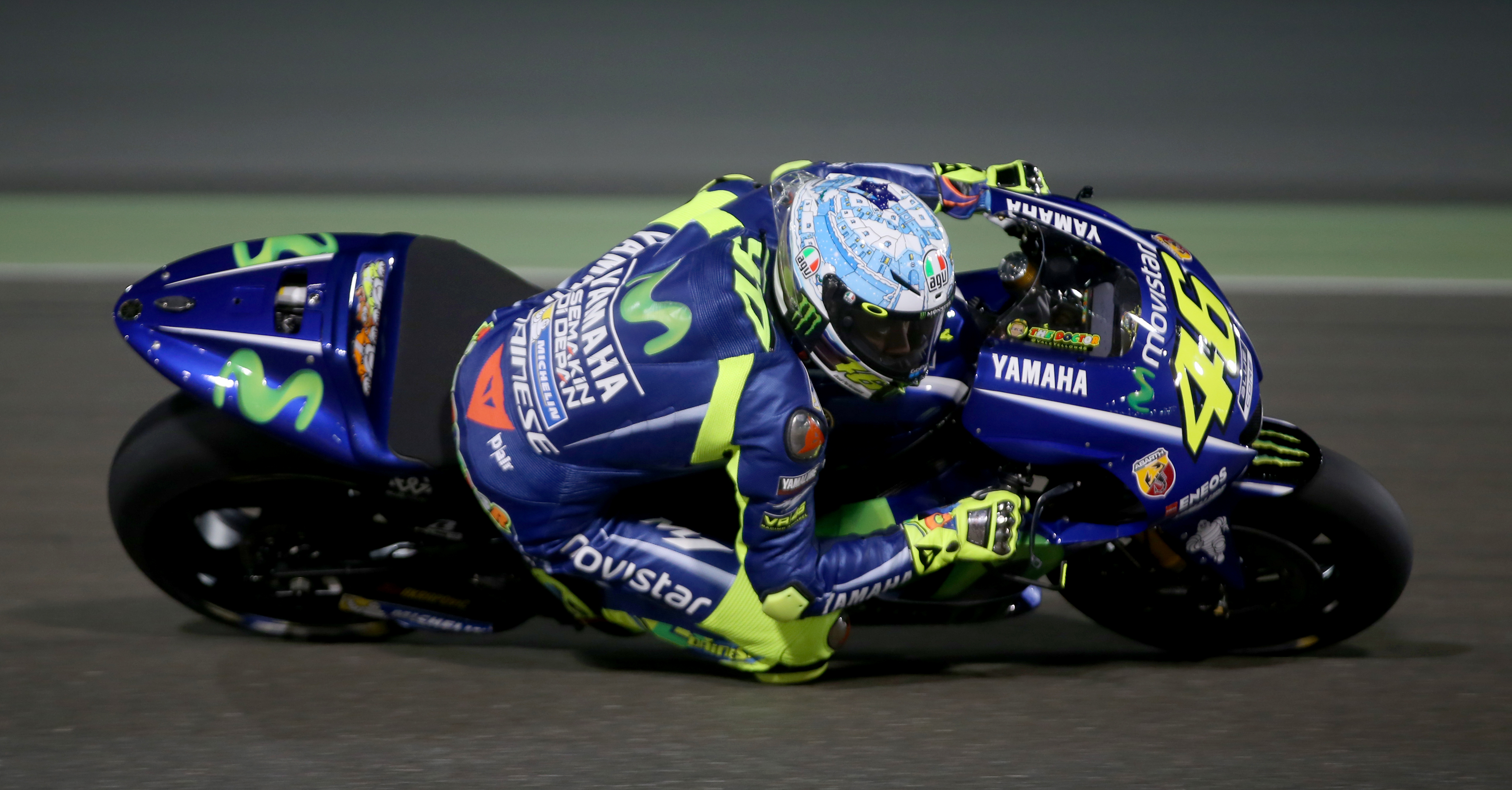
MotoGP racing

Grand Prix motorcycle racing refers to the premier category of motorcycle road racing. It is divided into three distinct classes:

- MotoGP: It is the current term for the highest class of GP racing. The class was contested with prototype machines with varying displacement and engine type over the years. Originally contested by large displacement four stroke machines in the early years it eventually switched to 500 cc two strokes. In 2002 990 cc four-stroke bikes were allowed to compete alongside the 500 cc two strokes and then completely replaced them in 2003. In 2007, there was a reduction to 800 cc four stroke engines due to high speeds and the 2008 financial crisis before they were finalized on 1000 cc four strokes in 2012.
- Moto2: Introduced by Dorna Sports, the commercial rights holder of the competition, in 2010 as a 600 cc four-stroke class. Prior to that season, the intermediate class was 250 cc with two-stroke engines. Moto2 races in the 2010 season allowed both engine types; from 2011 on, only Honda controlled-engine four-stroke Moto2 machines were allowed. Beginning in 2019, Triumph Motorcycles replaced Honda as the controlled-engine supplier for Moto2. The new engines are based on the 2017 Triumph Street Triple RS 765.
- Moto3: Introduced in 2012, motorcycles in this class are 250cc with single-cylinder four-stroke engines Previously it featured 125 cc two-stroke motorcycles. This class is also restricted by rider age, with an upper limit of 25 for newly signed riders and wild card entries and an absolute upper limit of 28 for all riders.

Grand Prix motorcycles are prototype machines not based on any production motorcycle.

==== Superbike racing ====
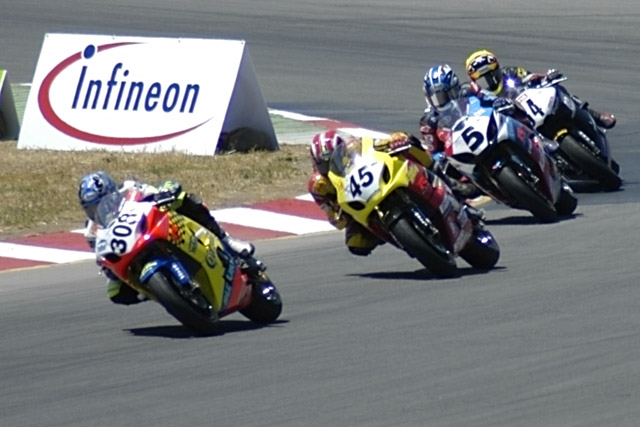
Superbike racing

Superbike racing is the category of motorcycle road racing that employs modified production motorcycles, as with touring cars. Superbike racing motorcycles must have four stroke engines of between 800 cc and 1200 cc for twins, and between 750 cc and 1000 cc for four cylinder machines. The motorcycles must maintain the same profile as their roadgoing counterparts. The overall appearance, seen from the front, rear and sides, must correspond to that of the bike homologated for use on public roads even though the mechanical elements of the machine have been modified.

==== Supersport racing ====
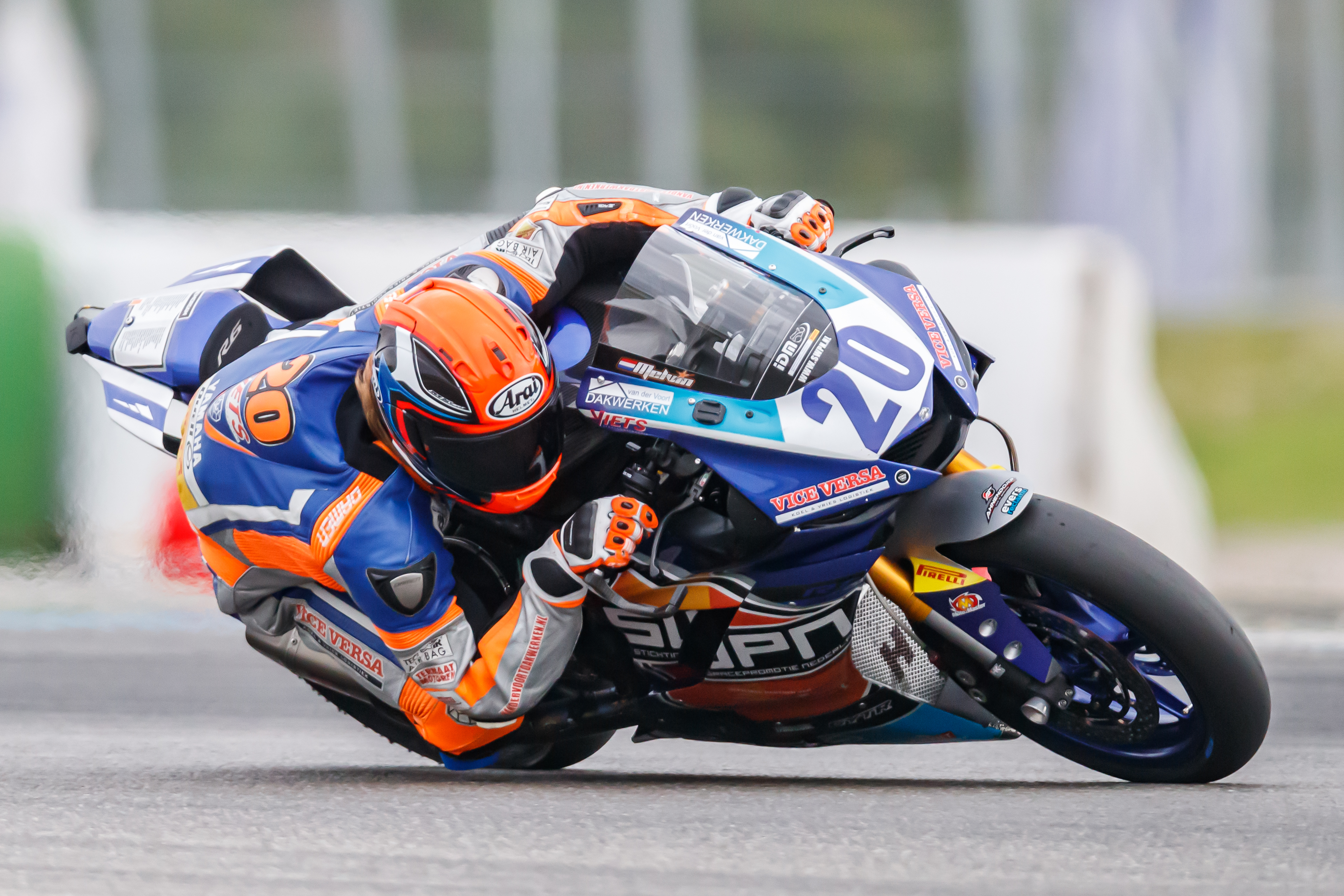
Supersport racing

Supersport racing is another category of motorcycle road racing that employs modified production motorcycles. To be eligible for Supersport racing, a motorcycle must have a four-stroke engine of between 250 and 600 cc for four-cylinder machines, and between 600 and 750 cc for twins, and must satisfy the FIM homologation requirements. Supersport regulations are much tighter than Superbikes. Supersport machines must remain largely as standard, while engine tuning is possible but tightly regulated.

==== Endurance racing ====
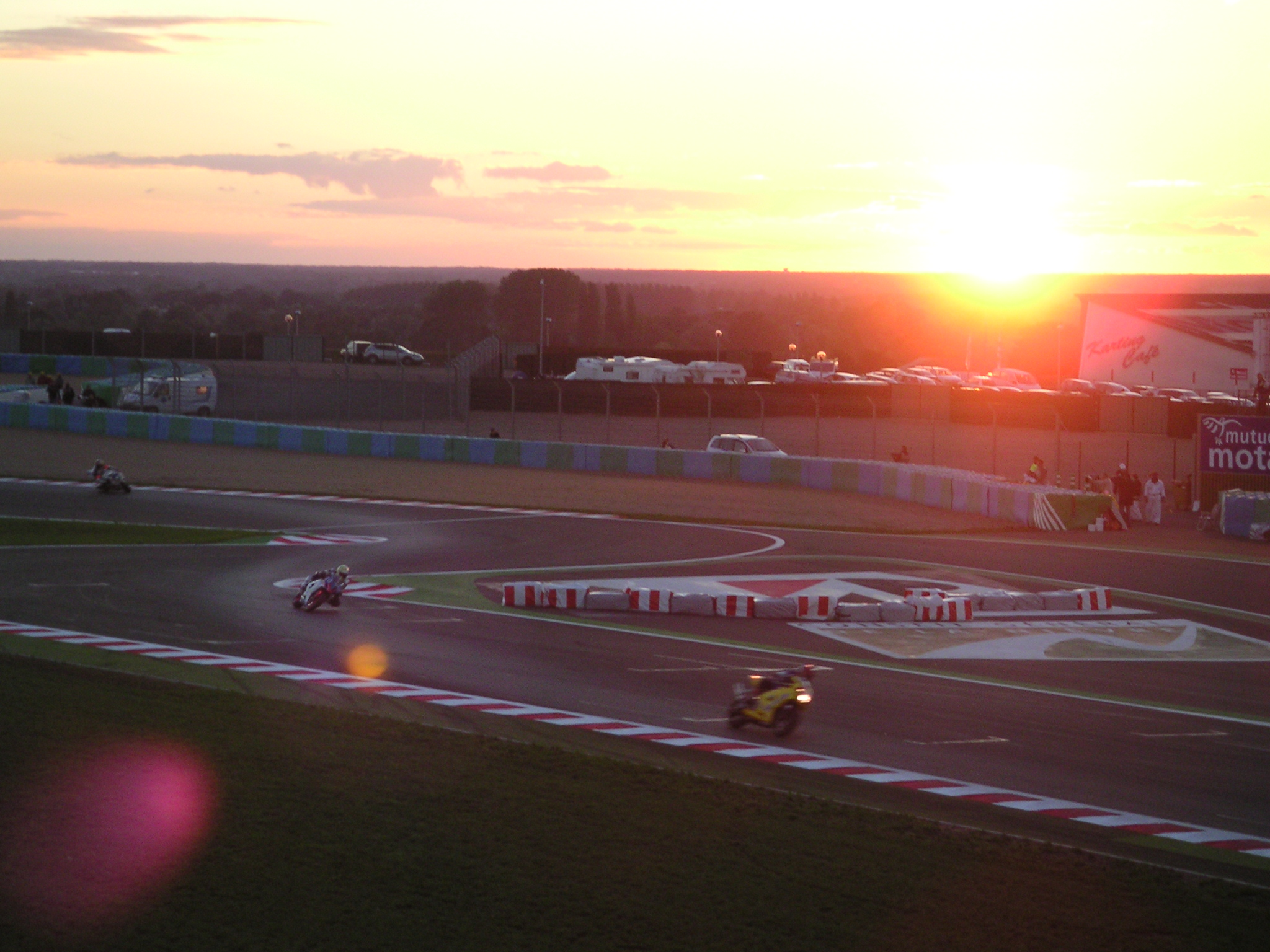
Endurance racing

Endurance racing is a category of motorcycle road racing which is meant to test the durability of equipment and endurance of the riders. Teams of multiple riders attempt to cover a large distance in a single event. Teams are given the ability to change riders during the race. Endurance races can be run either to cover a set distance in laps as quickly as possible, or to cover as much distance as possible over a preset amount of time. Reliability of the motorcycles used for endurance racing is paramount.

==== Road hill climb ====
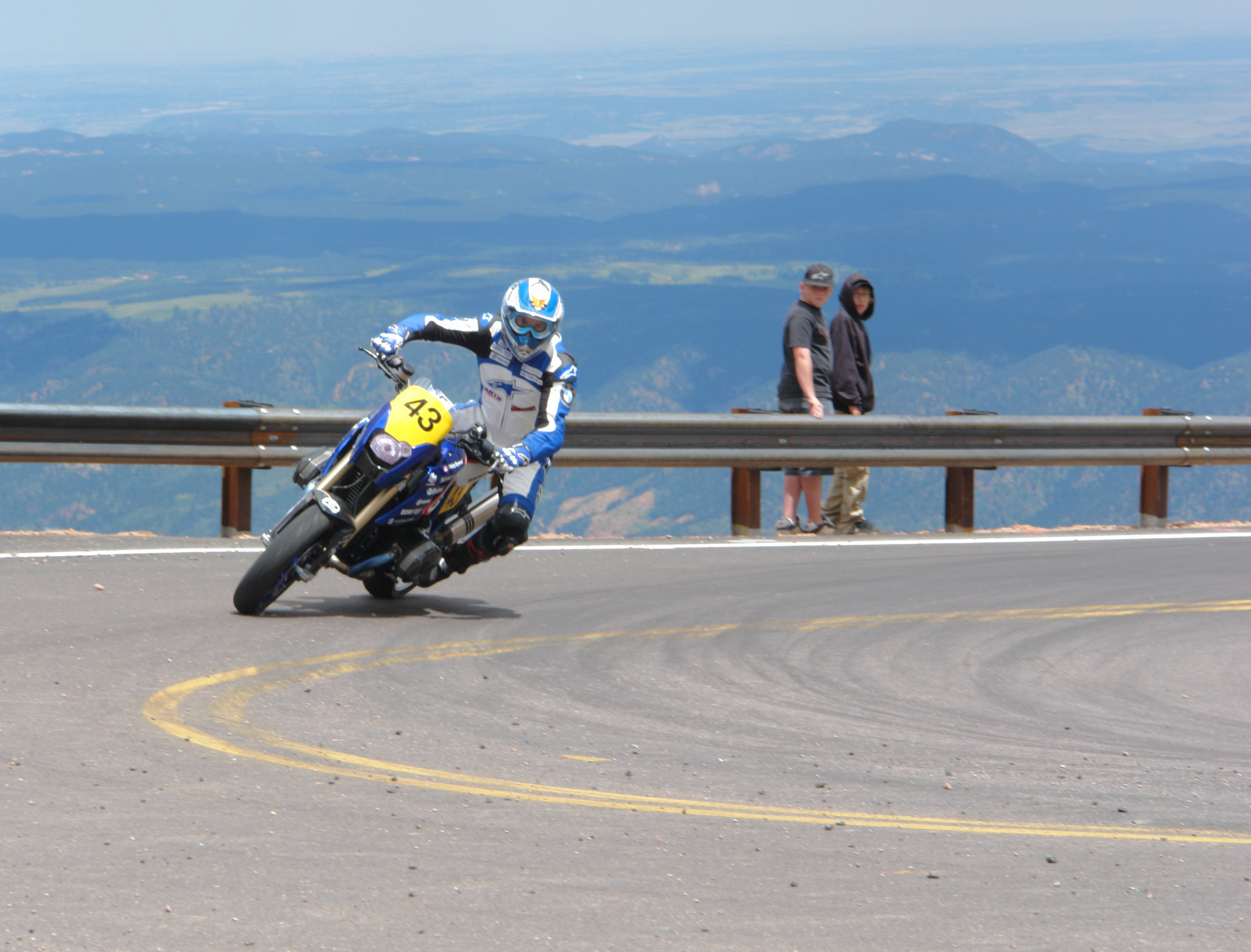
Motorcyle hill climb at Pikes Peak

Road hill climb takes place on tarmac courses and occasionally closed public roads, with the machines used for competition being similar to those used for other road disciplines. The most notable competitions are the NHCA in the United Kingdom and the FIM Europe Hill Climb Road Race Championship held in Italy, Austria, and Germany.

==== Sidecar racing ====
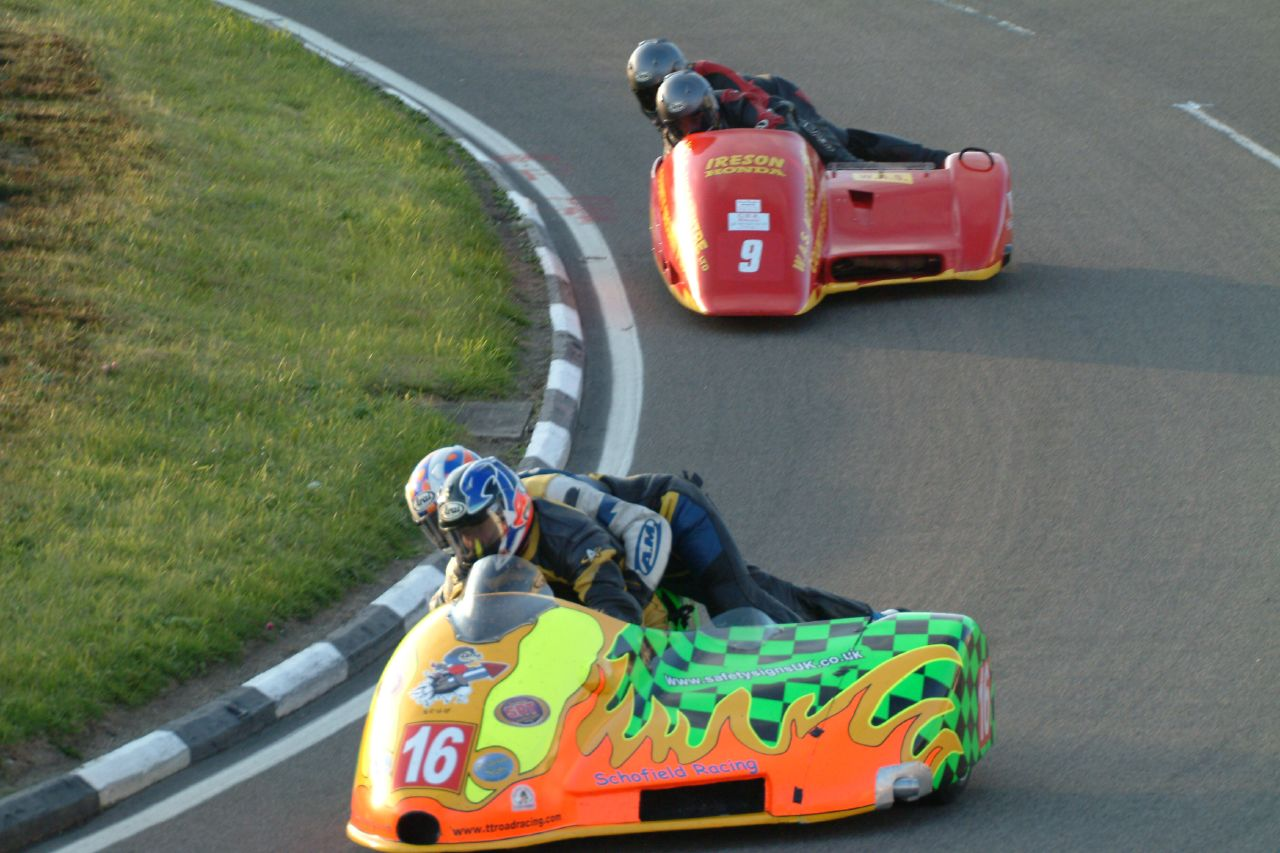
Sidecar racing

Sidecar racing is a category of sidecar motorcycle racing. Older sidecar road racers generally resembled solo motorcycles with a platform attached; modern racing sidecars are purpose built low and long vehicles. Sidecarcross resembles MX motorcycles with a high platform attached. In sidecar racing a rider and a passenger work together to make the machine perform optimally; the way in which a passenger shifts body weight across the sidecar is crucial to its performance around corners.

Sidecar racing has many sub-categories including:

- Sidecarcross (sidecar motocross)
- Sidecar trials
- F1/F2 road racing
- Historic (classic) road racing
- Sidecar speedway
- Sidecar hill climb

=== Motocross ===
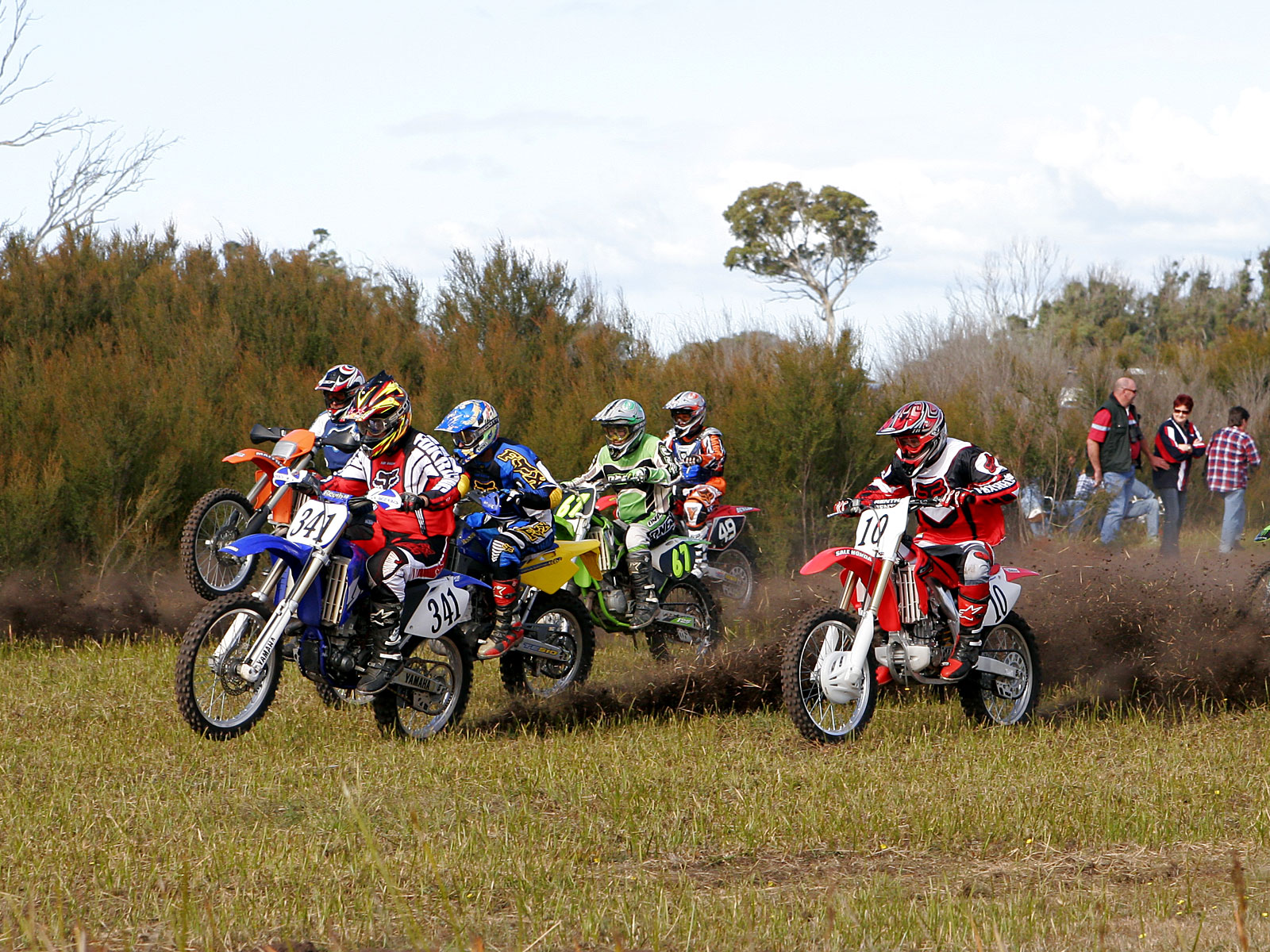
Start of a motocross race

Motocross (or MX) is the direct equivalent of road racing, but off-road, a number of bikes racing on a closed circuit. Motocross circuits are constructed on a variety of non-tarmac surfaces such as dirt, sand, mud, grass, etc., and tend to incorporate elevation changes either natural or artificial. Advances in motorcycle technology, especially suspension, have led to the predominance of circuits with added "jumps" on which bikes can get airborne. Motocross has another noticeable difference from road racing, in that starts are done en masse, with the riders alongside each other. Up to 40 riders race into the first corner, and sometimes there is a separate award for the first rider through (see holeshot). The winner is the first rider across the finish line, generally after a given amount of time or laps or a combination.

Motocross has classes based upon machine displacement (ranging from 50 cc 2-stroke youth machines up to 250 cc two-stroke and 450 cc four-stroke), age of competitor, ability of competitor, sidecars, quads/ATVs, and machine age (classic for pre-1965/67, Twinshock for bikes with two shock absorbers, etc.).

==== Supercross ====
Supercross (or SX) is simply indoor motocross. Supercross is more technical and rhythmic for riders. Typically situated in a variety of stadiums and open or closed arenas, it is notable for its numerous jumps. In North America, this has been turned into an extremely popular spectator sport, filling large baseball, soccer, and football stadiums, leading to Motocross being now termed the "outdoors". However, in Europe it is a less popular sport, as the predominant focus there is on Motocross.

==== Supermoto ====
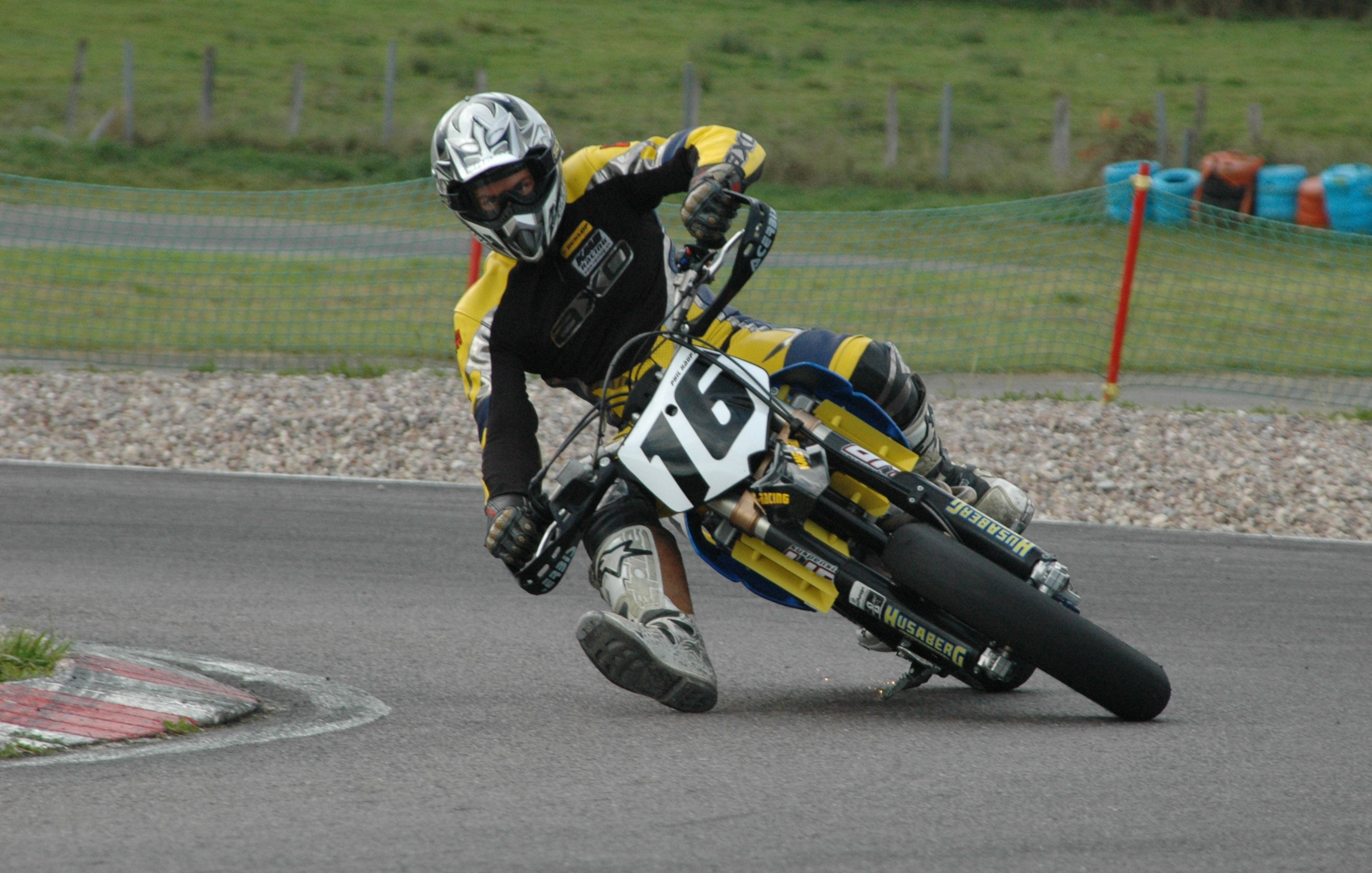
A supermoto rider on a tarmac section

Supermoto is a racing category that is a crossover between road-racing and motocross. The motorcycles are mainly motocross types with road-racing tyres. The racetrack is a mixture of road and dirt courses (in different proportions) and can take place either on closed circuits or in temporary venues (such as urban locations).

The riding style on the tarmac section is noticeably different from other forms of tarmac-based racing, with a different line into corners, sliding of the back wheel around the corner, and using the leg straight out to corner (as opposed to the noticeable touching of the bent knee to the tarmac of road racers).

==== Grand Prix ====
Grand Prix is a variety of motocross that combines both a motocross track and natural desert terrain at the same race.

==== Stubble cross ====
Stubble cross is a variety of motocross held in fields after harvest in the United Kingdom and Germany.

=== Enduro ===
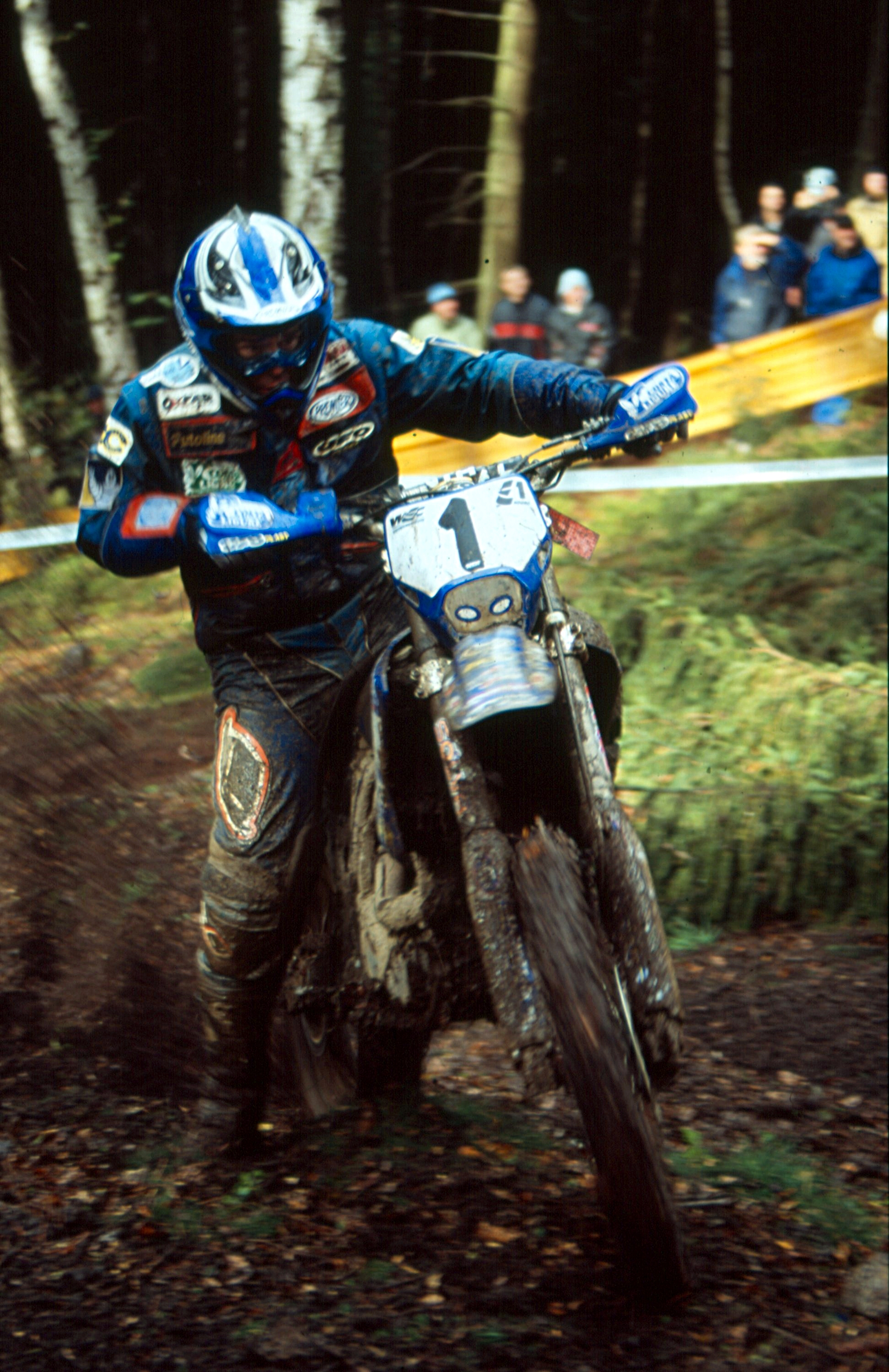
Former world enduro champion Stefan Merriman

Enduro is a form of off-road motorcycle sport that primarily focuses on the endurance of the competitor. In the most traditional sense ("Time Card Enduros"), competitors complete a 10+ mile lap, of predominately off-road going, often through forestry. The lap is made up of different stages, each with a target time to complete that stage in exactly, there are penalties for being early and late, thus the goal is to be exactly "on time". Some stages are deliberately "tight", others are lax allowing the competitor to recuperate. There are also a variety of special tests, on variety of terrain to further aid classification, these are speed stages where the fastest time is desired. A normal event lasts for 3 to 4 hours, although longer events are not uncommon. Some events, particularly national and world championship events take place over several days and require maintenance work to be carried out within a limited time window or while the race is running. To prevent circumvention of the maintenance restrictions, the motorcycles are kept overnight in secure storage.

There is a Enduro World Championship that has events across Europe, with a few excursions to North America. The most significant event in the Enduro calendar is the International Six Days Enduro (formerly the International Six Days Trial), where countries enter teams of riders (i.e. Enduro's "World Cup"), as well as club teams – the event combines amateur sport with the professional level sport, it also takes place in a much more geographically dispersed range of locations.

In addition to traditional time card enduros held over a long lap, a variety of other forms of sport have been taken up; notably "short course enduros", a shorter (in lap length) form of time card enduros hare scrambles and "Hare and Hounds".

==== Indoor enduro ====
Endurocross or indoor enduro is a variation of enduro held indoors. Riders must complete as quick as possible a course with obstacles similar to those in enduro.

===== Hard enduro =====
A variant of enduro called hard enduro also exists which take enduro racing to extremes with even larger, longer and tougher courses than enduro. The FIM Hard Enduro World Championship is the main championship in this category.

===== Vintage enduro =====
Another variant of enduro is vintage enduro, which combines the elements of off-road racing and long-distance touring, making it a popular choice among enthusiasts who enjoy the challenges and nostalgia associated with vintage motorcycles. Vintage enduro events often attract a dedicated community of riders, collectors, and fans who appreciate the history and craftsmanship of these classic machines.

Some of the regulations include, air-cooled two-stroke engines, drum brakes and kick starters. These features add to the nostalgic charm and require riders to adapt their riding techniques accordingly.

==== Beach racing ====
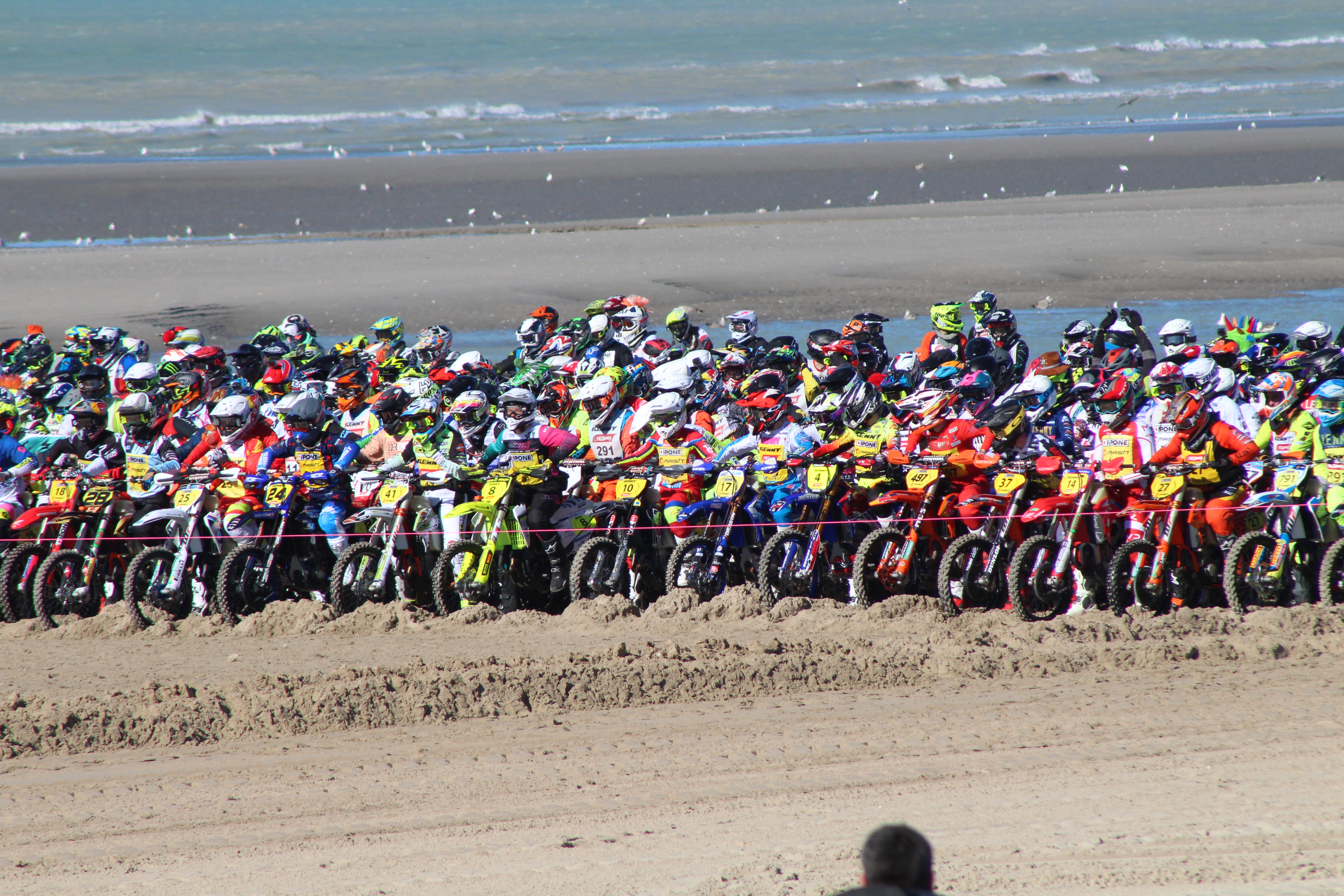
L'Enduropale in 2022

Beach racing is an offshoot of enduro and motocross racing. Riders on solo motorcycles, quad bikes, or sidecar combinations compete on a course marked out on a beach, often with man made jumps and sand dunes being constructed to make the course tougher.

==== Hare scramble ====
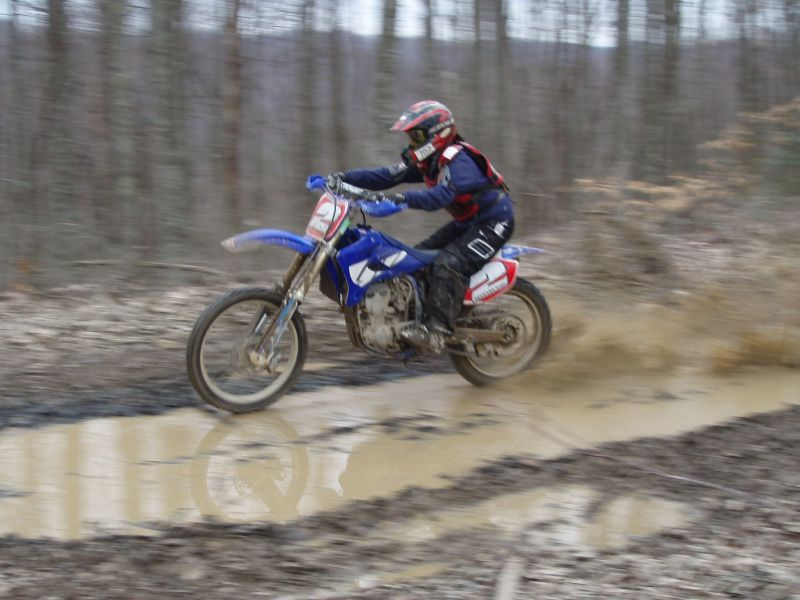
Hare scramble racer at Hyden, KY

Hare scramble is the name given to a particular form of off-road motorcycle racing. Traditionally a hare scramble can vary in length and time with the contestants completing multiple laps around a marked course through wooded or other rugged natural terrain. The overall winner is the contestant who maintains the highest speed throughout the event. In Florida, hare scrambles start the race with a staggered starting sequence. Once on the course, the object of the competitor is to complete the circuit as fast as possible. The race consists of wooded areas or open fields.

==== Hare and Hound ====
Hare and Hound is raced on a natural desert terrain in the United States. It is a two lap race, with a fast first lap and a more technical second lap.

=== Rally raid ===
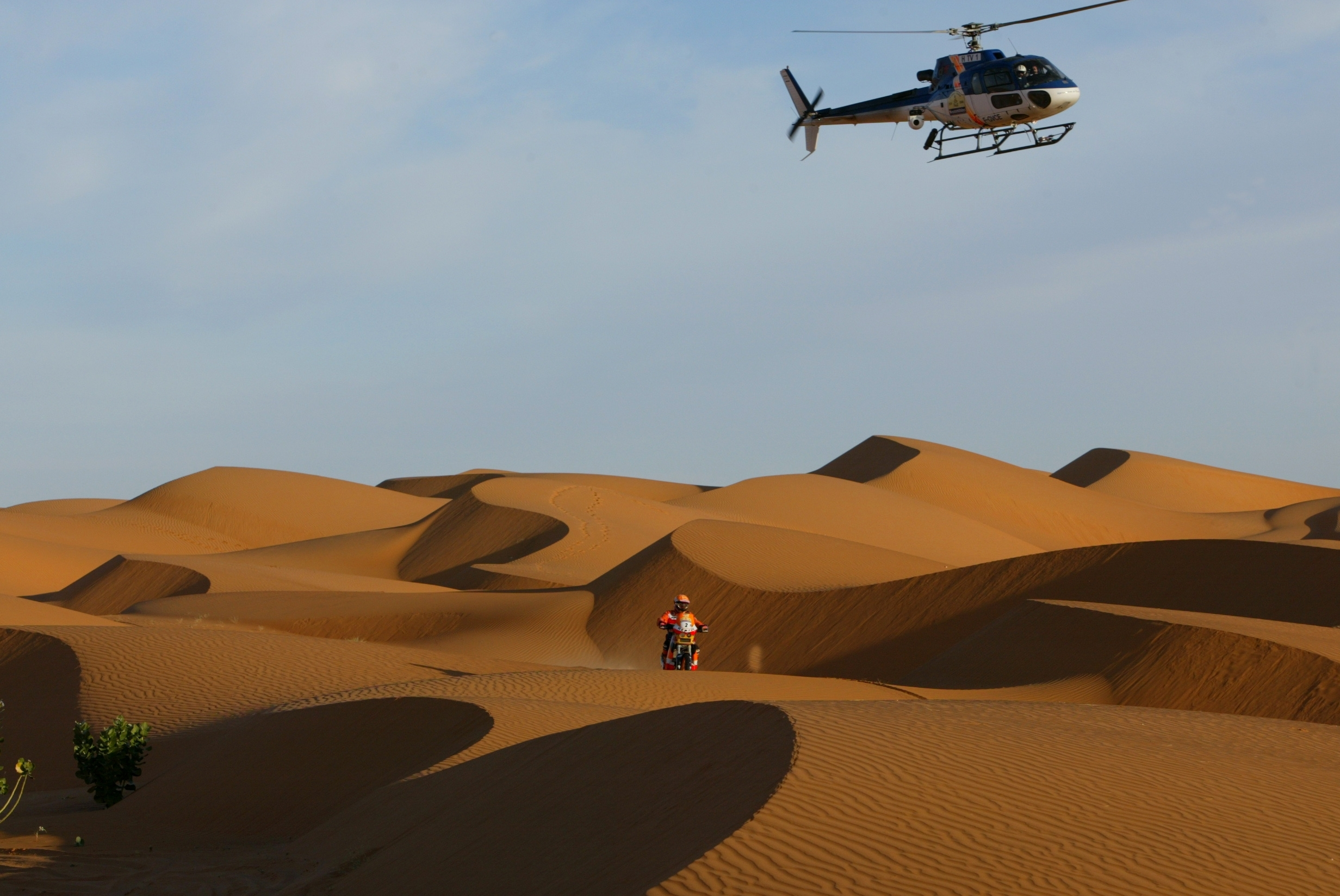
Dakar Rally

Rally raid events, or simply rally, are longer than enduros. Typically using bikes similar to those used in other off-road sports, these events take place over many days, travelling hundreds of miles across primarily open off-road terrain. The most famous example is the Dakar Rally, previously travelling from Western Europe (often Paris) to Dakar in Senegal, via the Sahara desert, taking almost two weeks. From 2009 to 2019 the Dakar Rally had been held in South America traveling through Argentina, Peru and Chile. Starting in 2020 the event now runs in the deserts of Saudi Arabia. The World Rally-Raid Championship also exists encompassing many events across the world, typically in desert nations. Such events include the Abu Dhabi Desert Challenge, and Rallye du Maroc. These events often run alongside "car" rallies (under the FIA). Other notable events include Silk Way Rally and Rally dos Sertões.

=== Desert racing ===
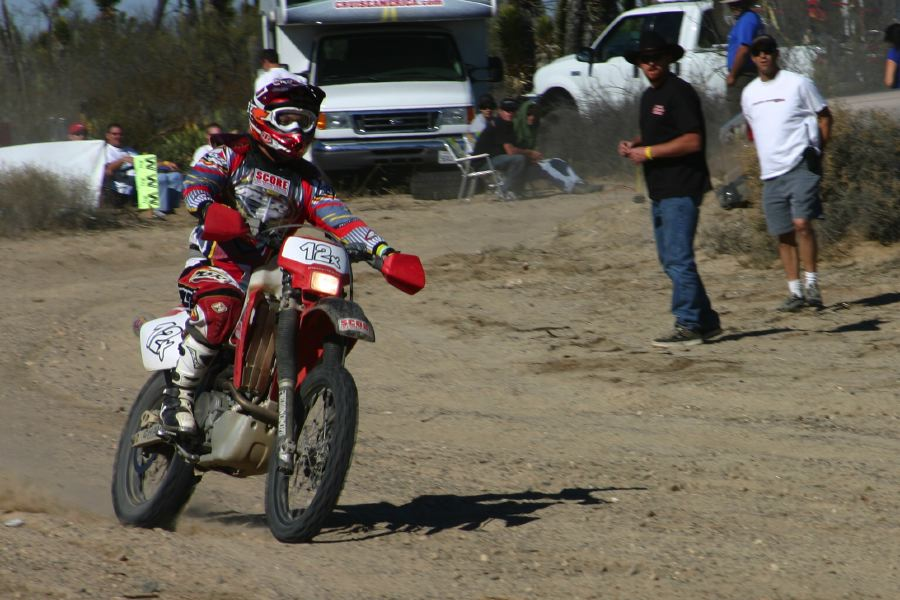
Baja 1000

Usually held in the United States and Mexico, desert races such as the Baja 1000 are usually run point-to-point, with no stages and involve less navigation than rally raid.

=== Track racing ===
Track racing is a form of motorcycle racing where teams or individuals race opponents around an oval track. There are differing variants, with each variant racing on a different surface type.

==== TT/flat track racing ====
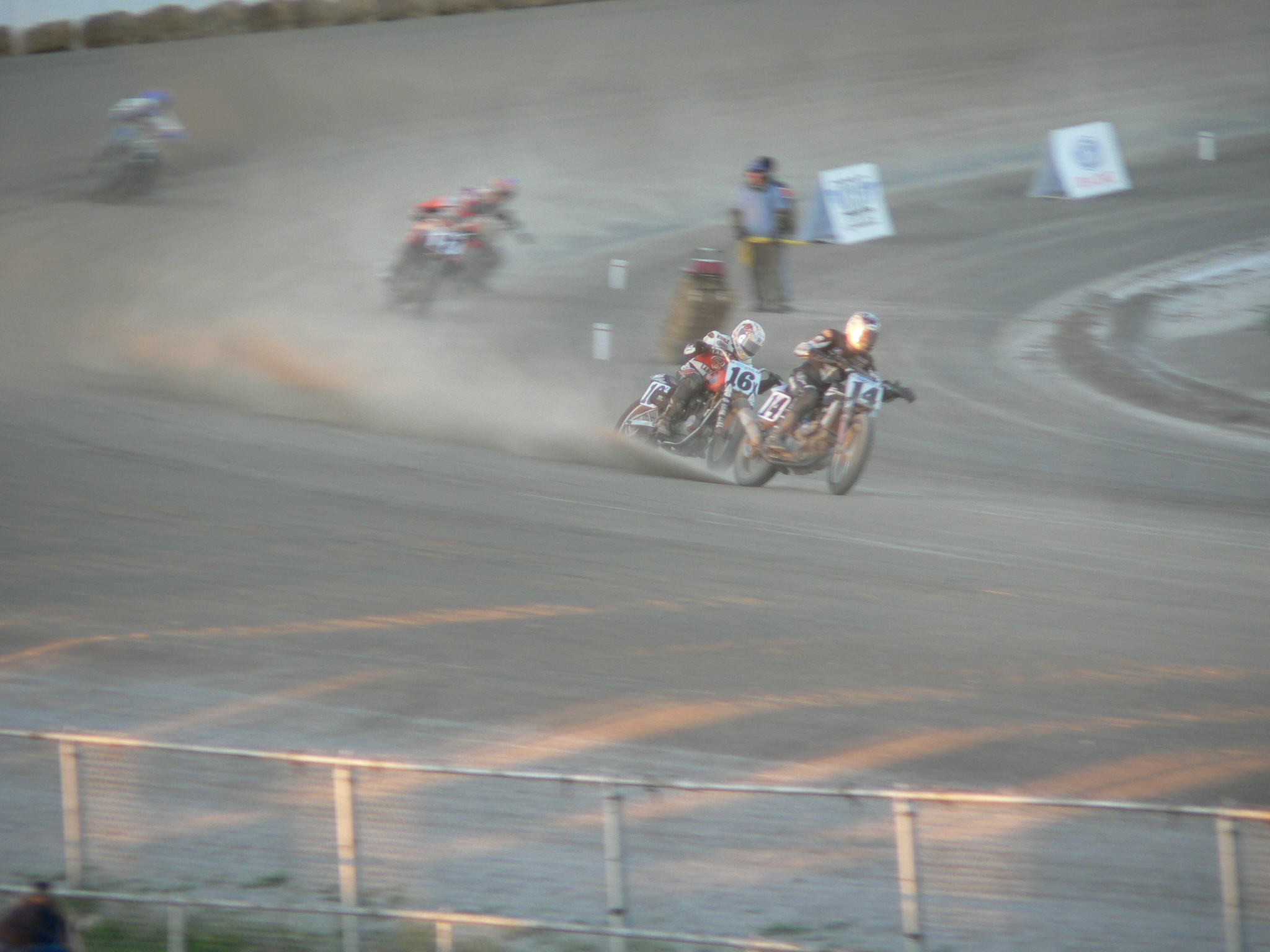
Track racing motorcycles

In the U.S., flat-track events are held on outdoor dirt ovals, ranging in length from one mile to half-mile, short-tracks and TTs. All are usually held outdoors, though a few short-track events have been held in indoor stadiums. A Short Track event is one involving a track of less than 1/2 mile in length, while a TT event can be of any length, but it must have at least one right turn and at least one jump to qualify.

In the AMA Grand National Championship, mile, half-mile, short-track and TT races are part of a specific discipline labelled "dirt track" or sometimes "flat track". However the AMA Sanction rule books refer to this discipline as Dirt track racing. Whether mile, half-mile, short-track or TT, traction is what defines a dirt track race. The bikes cannot use "knobbies", they must use "Class C" tires which are similar to street tires. On mile, half-mile, short-track course, the track is an oval, all turns to the left only, and only a rear brake is allowed. On the TT courses, there must be at least one right hand turn with a jump being optional, front and rear brakes are allowed, but the same "Class C" tires are required.

Although not mandated, most flat track racers wear a steel "shoe" on the left boot which is actually a fitted steel sole that straps onto the left boot. This steel shoe lets the rider slide more easily and safely on their left foot when needed as they lean the bike to the left while sliding through the corners, though riders can often perform what is known as a "feet-up slide", using throttle control, body lean and steering alone to power-slide through the turns, without sliding on their steel shoe.

Hard-packed tracks are generally referred to as "groove" tracks, loosely packed tracks are called "cushions". The composition of the track surface is usually decided by the race promoter and track preparation team, the latter using various methods and materials including combinations of clay, decomposed granite, sand, calcium (to allow the surface to retain water moisture) and other materials. An optimum "groove" track will have enough moisture to be "tacky", without being slick, and will develop what is called a "blue groove" as the motorcycle tires lay down a thin layer of tire rubber on the racing line.

A "cushion" track consists of similar materials to the groove track, but mixed in a way that allows the surface to maintain a more sandy, loose composition. While power-sliding is common on both groove and cushion tracks, a cushion track allows more power-sliding, into, through and out of the turns. Though the "Class C" tires allowed by the rules are the same for both cushion and groove tracks, riders are allowed to modify the tires by cutting some rubber off the tire grooves for improved traction, but are not allowed to add materials to the tires.

==== Indoor short track ====
Indoor races consist of either: a polished concrete floor with coke syrup, or other media sprayed or mopped onto the concrete for traction for the tyres of the motorcycles, or on dirt that has been moistened and hard packed, or left loose (often called a cushion), similar to the size of the Arenacross Arenas or sometimes smaller.

==== Speedway ====
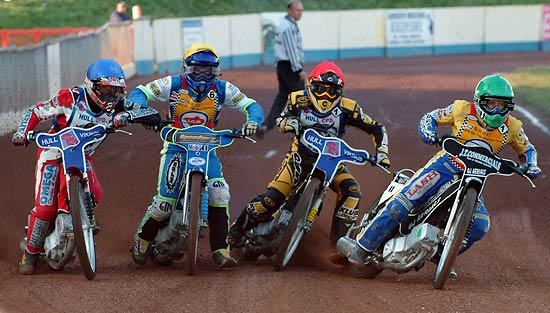
Speedway

Speedway racing takes place on a flat oval track usually consisting of dirt or loosely packed shale, using bikes with a single gear and no brakes. Competitors use this surface to slide their machines sideways (powersliding or broadsiding) into the bends using the rear wheel to scrub-off speed while still providing the drive to power the bike forward and around the bend.

==== Grasstrack ====
Grass track racing

Grasstrack is a variation of speedway. The track are longer (over 400 m, hence it is often also referred to as long track at world level), often on grass (although other surfaces exist) and even feature elevation changes. Machinery is very similar to a speedway bike (still no brakes, but normally featuring two gears and rear suspension).

==== Ice speedway ====
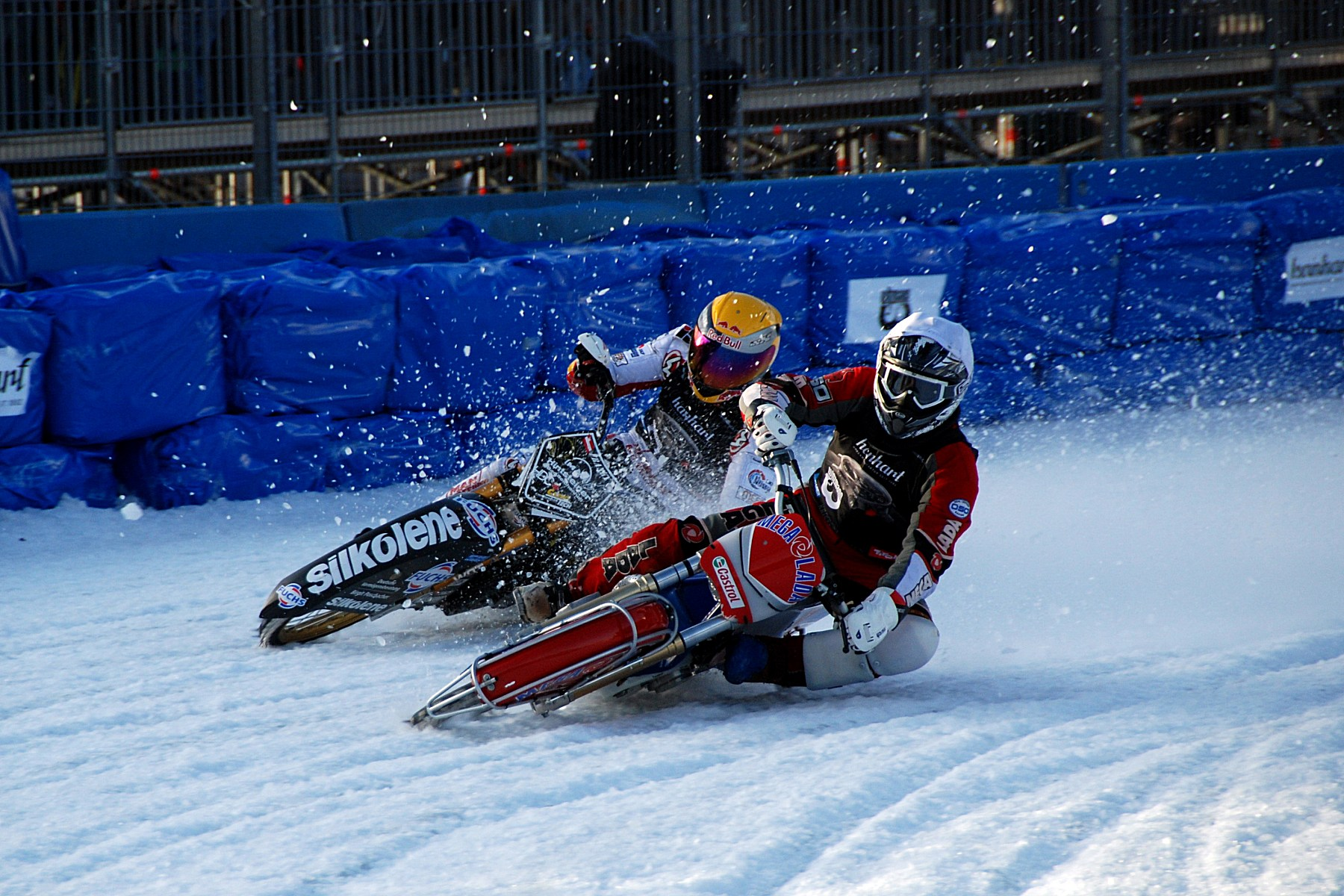
Ice racing using spikes

Ice racing includes a motorcycle class which is the equivalent of speedway on ice. Bikes race anti-clockwise around oval tracks between 260 and 425 metres in length. Metal tire spikes or screws are often allowed to improve traction. The race structure and scoring are similar to speedway.

==== Board track ====
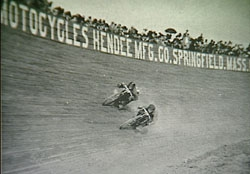
Board track racing

Board track racing was a type of track racing popular in the United States between the second and third decades of the 20th century, where competition was conducted on oval race courses with surfaces composed of wooden planks. By the early 1930s, board track racing had fallen out of favor, and into eventual obsolescence.

==== Auto Race ====
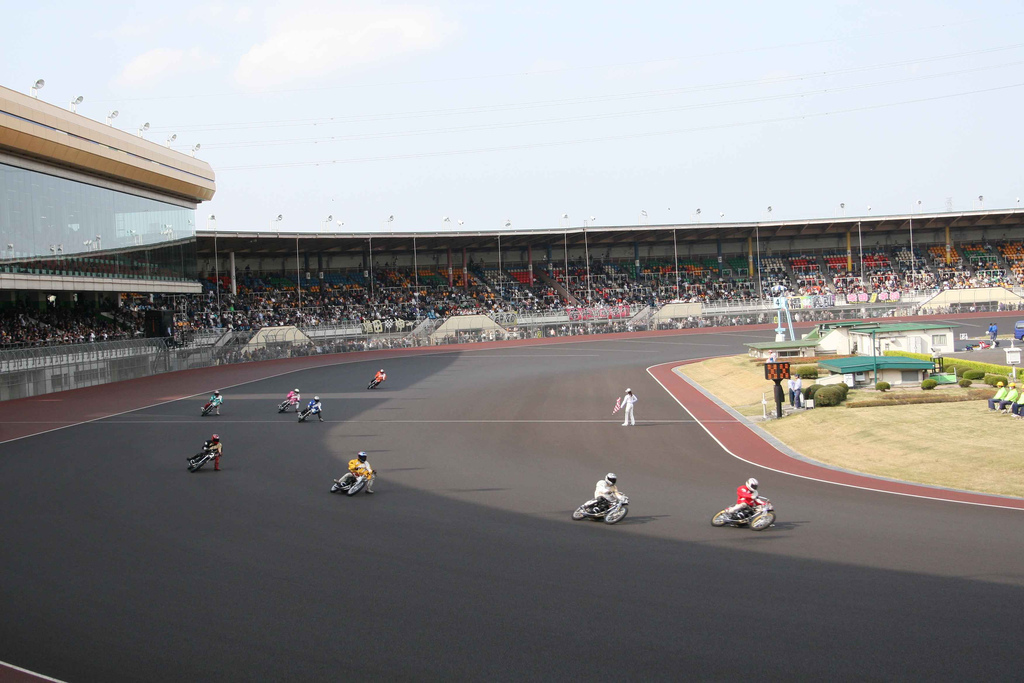
A race starts in Kawaguchi Auto Race Circuit

Auto Race is a Japanese version of track racing held on an asphalt oval course and seen as a gambling sport.

=== Other categories ===
==== Drag racing/sprints ====
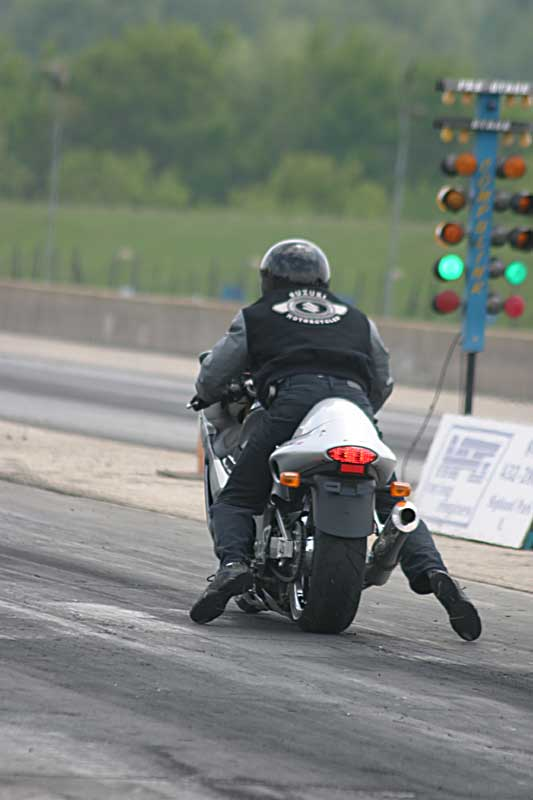
Drag racing

Drag racing or sprints is a racing venue where two participants line up at a dragstrip with a signaled starting line. Upon the starting signal, the riders accelerate down a straight, quarter-mile long paved track where their elapsed time and terminal speed are recorded. The rider to reach the finish line first is the winner. This can occur upon purpose built venues (e.g., Santa Pod), temporary venues (e.g., runways or drives of country houses). In addition to "regular" motorcycles, top fuel motorcycles using nitromethane also compete in this category.

==== Hillclimbing ====
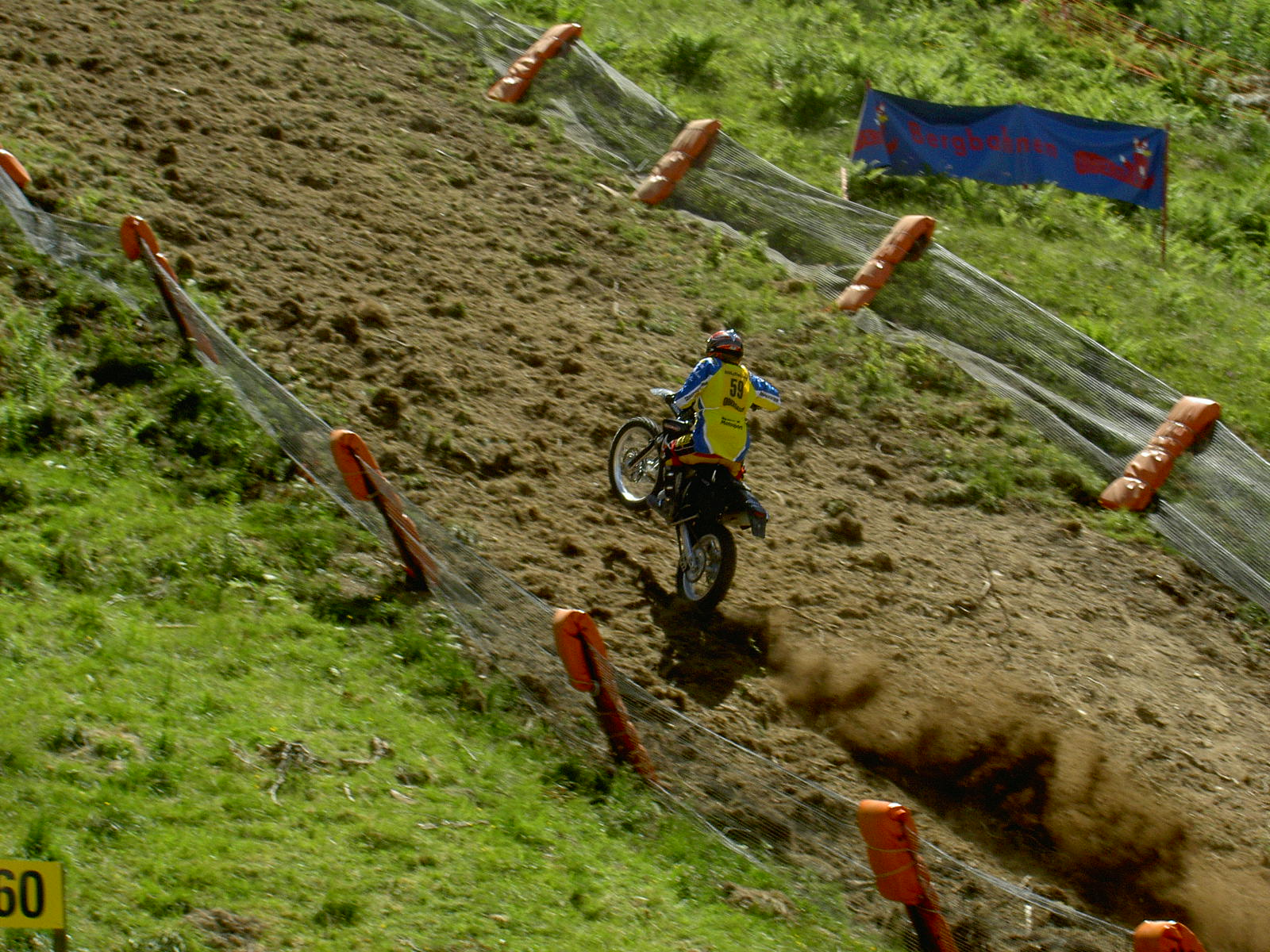
Hillclimbing

In motorcycle hillclimbing, one competitor at a time attempts to ride up a steep dirt hill. If riders fail to complete the course, their results are judged on the distance that they manage to achieve. Of those that succeed, the rider to reach the top with the shortest elapsed time wins.

In the United States, France and Belgium, the completions are usually held on off-road courses. For years the national competitions was held at Mount Garfield near Muskegon, Michigan. The Widowmaker hill climb in Utah is also one of the most prestigious and best-known motorcycle hill climbs in the world. In the United States, the top-flight championship is the American Hillclimb, sanctioned by the AMA Pro Racing. In France, the French Motorcycling Federation (FFM) holds the French Hillclimbing Championship (Championnat de France de Montée Impossible).

The motorcycles used are often modified motocross bikes, with common modifications including lengthened swingarms and specialized rear tires, such as paddle or studded tires for increased traction. The motorcycle of choice in the early decades was the Harley-Davidson 45 cubic inch model due to its high torque at low RPM, similar to farm engines.

==== Landspeed racing ====
In landspeed motorcycle racing, the racer is trying to beat the fastest speed ever achieved by that style of motorcycle and type of engine for a timed mile. The pre-eminent event for motorcycle LSR is the Bonneville Motorcycle Speed Trials by BUB, held on the Bonneville Salt Flats annually (near Labor Day). Motorcycles are classified based on body style, i.e. how much streamlining is incorporated. They are further classified based on engine displacement and based on fuel type (gasoline versus any modified fuels).

==== Vintage ====
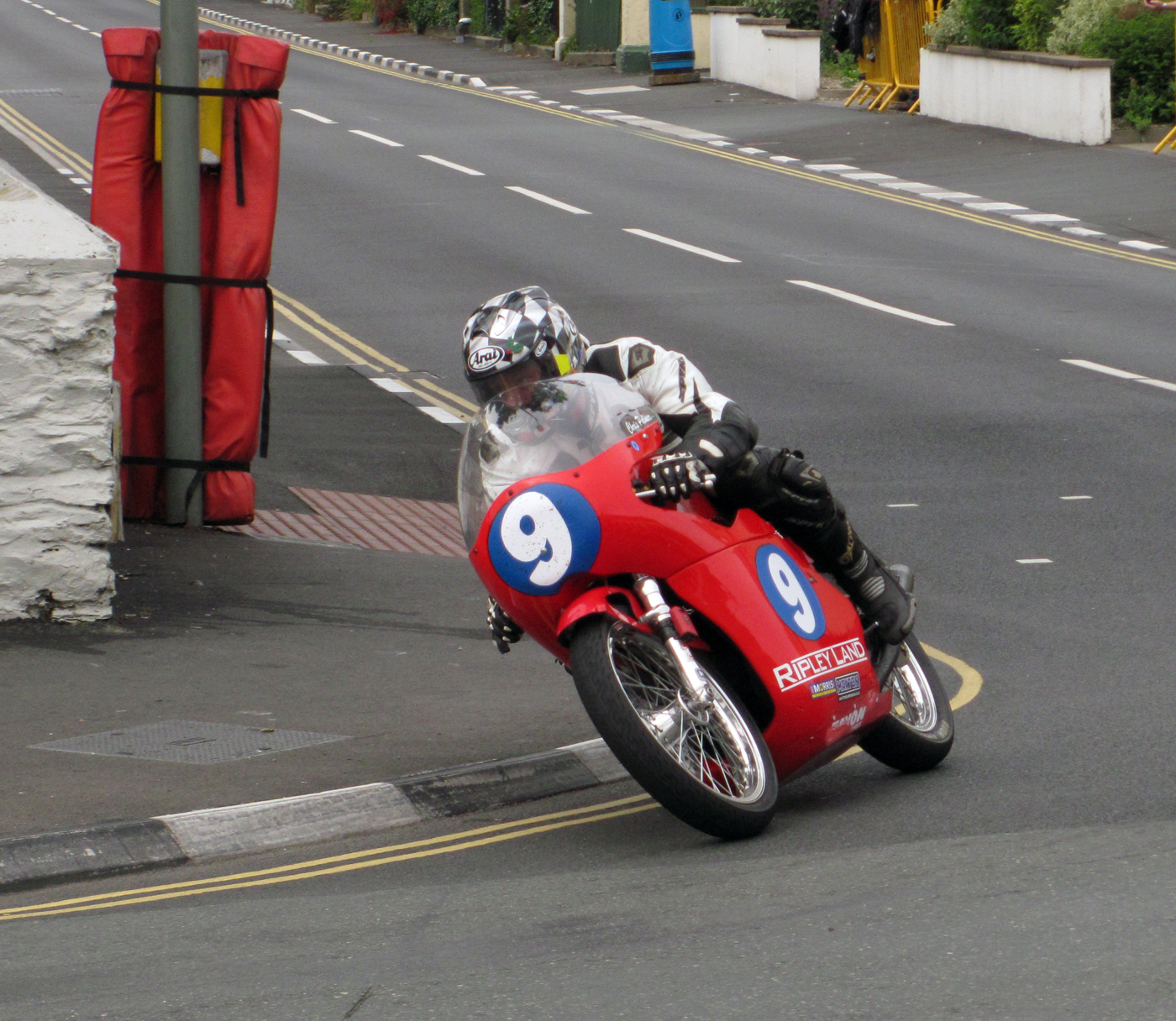
A 1972 Honda 350cc at the 2013 Classic TT

In vintage racing riders race classic motorcycles that are no longer competitive with the latest production motorcycles. Classes are organized by production period and engine displacement. There are vintage events for almost every type of racing listed above, vintage motocross and road racing are especially popular. Equipment is limited to that available for the production period, although modern safety equipment and tires are permitted. Most vintage production periods are from the 1970s and before, but now 1980s and 1990s motorcycles are being allowed into some events. Generally a motorcycle must be at least 25 years old to be considered vintage.

The sanctioning body for most US vintage racing is the American Motorcyclist Association. The main organizations that sponsor vintage racing are the American Historic Racing Motorcycle Association (AHRMA), BikeBandit and WERA Motorcycle Roadracing, which has several vintage classes along with modern racers. Of historical importance is the United States Classic Racing Association (USCRA) one of the oldest vintage racing clubs in the US. In the UK the Main organisations are The British Historic Racing Club (BHRC), an arm of the Vintage motorcycle club, and the Classic Motorcycle Racing Club (CRMRC). The CRMC was formed about thirty years ago when the BHRC was slow to include new machines in the 25 years rule and to deal with the first Japanese machines reaching that age. Nowadays the BHRC caters for machines from Europe and America made up to the mid eighties while the CRMC allows the same era and some but not all Japanese machines.

==== Super Hooligan ====
Hooligan racing has been around since the 1970s when fans attending flat track races began racing their own personal motorcycles during intermissions of events. Often these motorcycles were simply the bikes that fans rode to the event also known as "run what you brung" races. What's now known as "Super Hooligan" came out of the Harley nights at Costa Mesa Speedway in Southern California. Southern California motorcycle culture developed around this idea of racing large V Twin motorcycles. Super Hooligan races have been side entertainment at a number of events from bike shows like the Handbuilt in Austin, The One Show in Portland to the Superprestigio of the Americas in Las Vegas in 2016, to the flat track races held in conjunction with MotoGP at Circuit of the Americas. In 2017 Super Hooligan became an official racing series with 10 races on the calendar for that year from February through October.

== See also ==
- Motorcycle chariot racing
- Automobile racing
- List of auto racing tracks
- Racing game
- Bucket racing
- Outline of motorcycles and motorcycling
