= Motorcycle chariot racing =

Motorsport

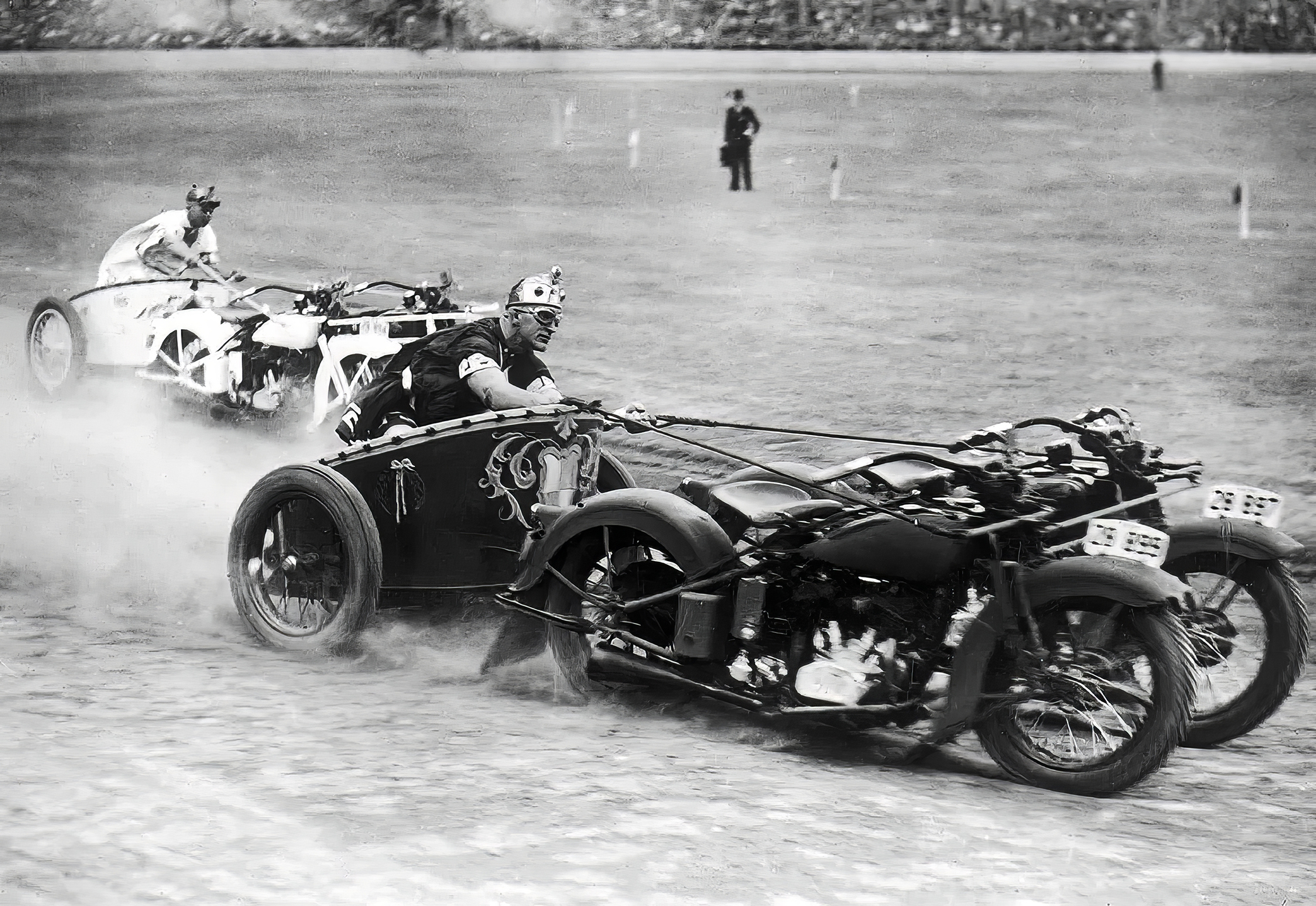
Motorcycle chariot racing 1936 in Australia.

Motorcycle chariot racing is a motor sport that combines motorcycle racing and chariot racing.

The first competition of the sport was held in the U.S. as early as 1922, and gained popularity in the 1920s and 1930s, further inspired by the 1925 film Ben-Hur. It went largely (although not entirely) extinct after that, although exhibition rigs are still made and driven.

One early event was held on June 4, 1922, at Idora Park in Oakland, California:

A novel feature of the day and one that excited roars of laughter from the spectators in the grandstand, consisted of motorcycle chariot races, said to be the first of their kind ever pulled off in the history of motorcycle racing.

After the early events, the sport was further developed in Australia and quickly spread to Europe. In 1925, Pathé News filmed an exhibition race at Crystal Palace Park, London.

A typical early vehicle configuration was a rider on a motorcycle pulling a chariot and charioteer who were essentially ornamental. A 1922 short piece in Popular Mechanics describes this configuration. This soon developed into a configuration with two riderless motorcycles steered by a single charioteer using reins. Steering was sometimes done with reins attached to the throttles (the charioteer steered by controlling the relative speed of the two motorcycles), and sometimes with rigid extensions attached to the handlebars. Modern rigs may have foot pedals for speed control, the reins used for steering the front wheels.
