= Bucket racing =

Bucket Racing is a discipline of motorcycle sport originating in New Zealand and also popular in Australia.

== Origins ==
Bucket racing was originally started by motorcycling enthusiasts in New Zealand around 1980. The original idea was to take a low-powered commuter motorcycle with a maximum capacity of 150 cc and remove the entire road-going gear, thus creating the cheapest possible form of motorcycle racing. The name derives from the Bowdlerised slang phrase "bucket of shit"; rather than the usual finely tuned racing machines usual for racing circuits, the bikes used were often recycled ex–road machines that had crashed or fallen into disrepair.

It became very popular, and spread to Australia by 1988. At its height in the mid-1990s, there were up to 60 competitors at race meetings in New South Wales where the sport was most popular, divided into "Amateur" and "Pro" classes (junior and senior riders based on experience and ability).

As a form of inexpensive racing the class has competitors from teenagers to retirees, attracted to the sport by its low cost and accessibility. Bikes prepared for bucket racing sell for about $1,500.

== Bucket racers ==
As bucket racing developed, it was accompanied by enthusiasts, known as "Garagists", who developed their racing bikes into highly-crafted, fast racing machines. The addition of racing seats, fiberglass fairings, rear set footrests and gear changes and racing handlebars made some of the bikes replicas of more modern racing machines

In addition, home developers engineered the motors of their machines and significantly increased power outputs from the normal road going power of around 8–12 horse power to outputs in excess of 20 horse power. The home developers were able to create motors that produced power outputs equivalent to factory-produced GP race machines.

A well-developed bucket racer is on display at the National Motor Museum at Mount Panorama, Bathurst, New South Wales, and there is also a Honda H100 machine at the Powerhouse Museum in Sydney.

== Further development ==
As the rules developed the machines separated into two classes. The original race bikes remained as Superlites, and a new class of Motolites was developed, allowing various engine types and capacity and unlimited development of any other part of the machine. The capacity sizes are: 111 cc Air-cooled 2 strokes, 85 cc Water-cooled 2 strokes, 159 cc 4-valve single-cylinder 4-stroke, 185 cc 2-valve single-cylinder 4-stroke, 159 cc 2-valve twin-cylinder 4-stroke, 200 cc 2-valve air-cooled single-cylinder 4-stroke.

The open rules encouraged the use of more modern and higher quality frames and running gear. Popular combinations include Honda RS125 frames with Honda CR85 engine, Yamaha TZ125 frames with Yamaha YZ85 engine, Moriwaki GP80 race bikes, Honda/Jiangshe 185 cc engines in a variety of frames and water-cooled 4 strokes such as the Honda CRF150 and CBR150. The commonly sought after levels of horsepower to be competitive are 28 hp for a two-stroke or about 25 hp for a four-stroke.

In New Zealand the rules have developed a slightly different classification system of bikes, with the maximum engine size in Formula 4; two strokes up to 100 cc water-cooled or 125 cc air-cooled and 4-strokes up to 150 cc water-cooled and Formula 5; 50 cc 2-strokes and 100 cc 4-strokes. The rules over what else can be used in the building of the motorcycle are broader, allowing more variety of bike parts, and consequently the development of widely differing machines with mixed results in performance.

== Introduction of Commuterlites/Stock Class ==
The Commuterlite class, introduced in 2011, allows any ADR compliant 125cc 4 stroke motorcycle of any age to race. The rules only permit changes to exhaust, suspension gearing and bodywork, keeping costs down. The most common models running in this class are Honda CBR 125, Yamaha YZFR125, Aprilia RS4 125, and KTM Duke 125.
