= 2013 Manx Grand Prix =

(Isle of Man) 2013 Manx Grand Prix
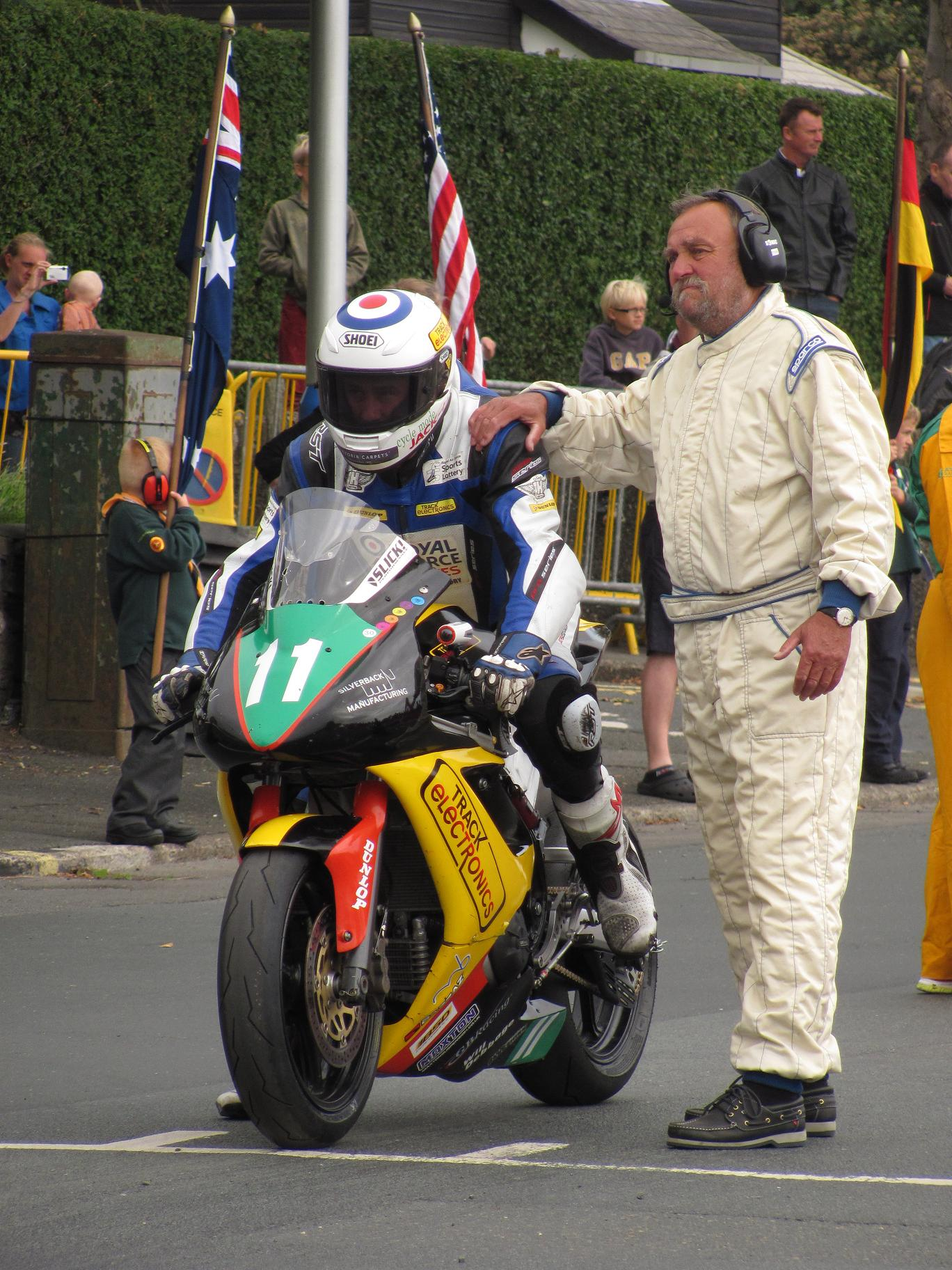
- Michael Russell (11) Suzuki — 650cc Super-Twin Race Manx Grand Prix 2013 - Startline TT Grandstand 30 August 2013

Race details
Date	17 August – 30 August 2013
Location	Douglas, Isle of Man
Course	Road Course; 37.73 mi (60.72 km)

2013 Isle of Man Festival of Motorcycling including the Manx Grand Prix and the Classic TT Races were held between Saturday 17 August and Friday 30 August 2013 on the 37.73-mile Mountain Course.

The rebranded festival by the Isle of Man Department of Economic Development and the Manx Motor Cycle Club (MMCC) will included the Manx Grand Prix Races, the Manx Classic, the Manx Two Day Trials and the VMCC Manx Rally which will include the Festival of Jurby. The newly developed Festival will retain elements of the existing Manx Grand Prix Races, while also include the important Isle of Man TT brand in a new Classic TT, which will form part of a three-day classic meeting including a parade to celebrate the 90th Anniversary of the Manx Grand Prix.

== Results ==
=== Race results ===
==== Race 1; 500 cc Classic TT Race ====
Saturday 24 August 2013 Mountain Course 4 laps – 150.92 miles (242.80 km)

- For classic motor-cycles exceeding 351 cc and not exceeding 500 cc

Rank	Rider	Team	Speed	Time
1	(England) Ollie Linsdell	500 cc Paton	110.256 mph	1:22.07.732
2	(Northern Ireland) William Dunlop	500 cc Honda	107.610 mph	1:24.08.911
3	(England) Jamie Coward	500 cc Norton	107.091 mph	1:24.33.366
4	(Wales) Ian Lougher	500 cc Royal Enfield	106.764 mph	1:24.48.890
5	(England) Roy Richardson	476 cc Aermacchi	106.619 mph	1:24.55.851
6	(England) James Hillier	500 cc Honda	101.031 mph	1:29.37.690
7	(Northern Ireland) Michael Dunlop	500 cc Norton	100.612 mph	1:30.00.065
8	(Isle of Man) David Madsen-Mygdal	500 cc Honda	100.496 mph	1:30.06.290
9	(Isle of Man) Allan Brew	500 cc Seeley G50	100.415 mph	1:30.10.642
10	(England) Doug Snow	500 cc Ducati	98.075 mph	1:32.19.762

Fastest Lap: Ollie Linsdell – 111.660 mph (20 minutes 16.446 secs)

==== Race 2a; 350 cc Junior Classic TT Race ====
Monday 26 August 2013 Mountain Course 4 laps – 150.92 miles (242.80 km)

- For motor-cycles exceeding 300 cc and not exceeding 351 cc

Rank	Rider	Team	Speed	Time
1	(England) Chris Palmer	350 cc Honda	101.048 mph	1:29.36.797
2	(Australia) Cameron Donald	350 cc AJS	99.781 mph	1:30.45.048
3	(England) Daniel Cooper	350 cc Norton	99.609 mph	1:30.54.446
4	(Northern Ireland) Nigel Moore	350 cc Honda	98.746 mph	1:31.42.091
5	(England) Doug Snow	350 cc Ducati	98.598 mph	1:31.50.400
6	(Isle of Man) David Madsen-Mygdal	350 cc Honda	96.911 mph	1:33.26.307
7	(Isle of Man) Conor Cummins	350 cc Norton	96.758 mph	1:33.35.190
8	(England) Alex Sinclair	350 cc Honda	96.571 mph	1:33.46.032
9	(England) Chris Petty	350 cc Honda	96.571 mph	1:35.44.634
10	(England) Alex Whitwell	350 cc Honda	90.125 mph	1:36.21.962

Fastest Lap; Chris Palmer 101.469 mph (22 minutes 18.469 secs)

==== Race 2b; 250 cc Lightweight Classic TT Race ====
Monday 26 August 2013 Mountain Course 4 laps – 150.92 miles (242.80 km)

- For motor-cycles exceeding 175 cc and not exceeding 250 cc

Rank	Rider	Team	Speed	Time
1	(England) Jonathan Cutts	250 cc Suzuki	93.139 mph	1:37.13.323
2	(England) Peter Wakefield	250 cc Suzuki	91.572 mph	1:38.53.149
3	(England) Geoff Bates	250 cc Honda	83.888 mph	1:47.56.655
4	(England) Tom Jackson	250 cc Suzuki	83.411 mph	1:48.33.645
5	(England) Henry Bell	250 cc Honda	83.165 mph	1:48.52.977
6	(England) Bob Millinship	250 cc Ducati	80.764 mph	1:52.07.163
7	(England) Alan Smallbones	250 cc Ducati	80.519 mph	1:54.20.163
8	(Northern Ireland) Robert John Woolsey	250 cc Suzuki	79.785 mph	1:55.07.296

Fastest Lap; Ewan Hamilton 95.911 mph (23 minutes 36.186 secs)

==== Race 3a; Classic TT Formula 1 Superbike Race ====
Monday 26 August 2013 Mountain Course 4 laps – 150.92 miles (242.80 km)

- Class A
- Classic Machines 601 cc–1050 cc Four-stroke motorcycles.
- 351 cc–750 cc Two-stroke motorcycles.

Rank	Rider	Team	Speed	Time
1	(Northern Ireland) Michael Dunlop	1100 cc Suzuki	120.367 mph	1:15.13.793
2	(Isle of Man) Conor Cummins	1100 cc Suzuki	118.790 mph	1:16.13.722
3	(Isle of Man) Ryan Kneen	750 cc Yamaha	117.105 mph	1:17.19.518
4	(Isle of Man) John Barton	750 cc Kawasaki	114.272 mph	1:19.51.612
5	(United States) Mark Miller	750 cc Yamaha	113.388 mph	1:19.51.612
6	(England) Russ Mountford	1000 cc Kawasaki	112.788 mph	1:20.17.122
7	(Isle of Man) Daniel Sayle	750 cc Honda	110.902 mph	1:21.39.027
8	(Isle of Man) Adrian Cox	600 cc Honda	110.832 mph	1:21.42.119
9	(England) Alan Oversby	750 cc Suzuki	110.664 mph	1:21.49.565
10	(Isle of Man) David Madsen-Mygdal	750 cc Honda	110.657 mph	1:21.49.892

Fastest Lap; Michael Dunlop 123.6780 mph (18 minutes 18.236 secs)

==== Race 3b; Classic TT Formula 2 Race ====
Monday 26 August 2013 Mountain Course 4 laps – 150.92 miles (242.80 km)

- 126 cc–250 cc Two-stroke Cylinder Grand Prix/Factory Standard motor-cycles/steel-frame or period aluminium.
- 251 cc–350 cc Two-stroke Cylinder standard motor-cycles/steel-frame.
- Up to 600 cc Four-stroke Cylinder motorcycles.
- For motorcycles exceeding 175 cc and not exceeding 250 cc

Rank	Rider	Team	Speed	Time
1	(England) Chris Palmer	250 cc Yamaha	109.944 mph	1:22.21.694
2	(England) James Cowton	250 cc Yamaha	109.701 mph	1:22.32.656
3	(England) Philip McGurk	250 cc Yamaha	108.121 mph	1:23.45.022
4	(United Kingdom) Chris Moore	250 cc Yamaha	106.240 mph	1:25.14.017
5	(Northern Ireland) Shaun Anderson	250 cc Kawasaki	104.570 mph	1:26.35.677
6	(Scotland) Derek Glass	250 cc Kawasaki	101.933 mph	1:28.50.114
7	(England) Peter Symes	250 cc Honda	100.652 mph	1:29.57.939
8	(Isle of Man) Neil Chadwick	250 cc Yamaha	99.282 mph	1:31.12.413
9	(England) Adrian Morris	250 cc Yamaha	96.404 mph	1:33.55.755
10	(England) Richard Charlton	250 cc Ducati	95.818 mph	1:34.30.226

Fastest Lap; James Cowton 111.872 mph (20 minutes 14.142 secs)

==== Race 4a; Newcomers Race 'A' ====
Wednesday 28 August 2013 Mountain Course 4 laps – 150.92 miles (242.80 km)

- Class A
- 550 cc–750 cc Four-stroke Four-cylinder motor-cycles.
- 651 cc–1000 cc Four-stroke Twin-cylinder motor-cycles.
- 601 cc–675 cc Four-stroke Three-cylinder motor-cycles.
- 601 cc–1000 cc Rotary motorcycles.

Rank	Rider	Team	Speed	Time
1	(England) Christopher Dixon	600 cc Yamaha	112.511 mph	1:20.28.971
2	(England) Connor Behan	600 cc Kawasaki	111.981 mph	1:20.51.810
3	(Isle of Man) Marc Liversey	600 cc Yamaha	111.693 mph	1:21.04.327
4	(Republic of Ireland) Richard McLoughlin	600 cc Honda	111.453 mph	1:21.14.796
5	(England) Daley Mathison	600 cc Suzuki	110.880 mph	1:21.39.981
6	(England) Tom Robinson	600 cc Kawasaki	110.516 mph	1:21.56.145
7	(Republic of Ireland) Jason Corcoran	600 cc Yamaha	109.681 mph	1:22.33.568
8	(England) Alexander Pickett	848 cc Ducati	109.558 mph	1:22.39.124
9	(England) Neil Gregory	675 cc Triumph	108.896 mph	1:23.09.292
10	(England) Warren Verwey	600 cc Kawasaki	107.862 mph	1:23.57.111

Fastest Lap: Connor Behan – 115.139 mph (19' 39.687)

==== Race 5; Junior Manx Grand Prix ====
Wednesday 28 August 2013 Mountain Course 4 laps – 150.92 miles (242.80 km)

- 201 cc–250 cc Two-stroke Two-cylinder motor-cycles.
- 550 cc–600 cc Four-stroke Four-cylinder motor-cycles.
- 601 cc–675 cc Four-stroke Three-cylinder motor-cycles.
- 651 cc–750 cc Four-stroke Two-cylinder motor-cycles.

Rank	Rider	Team	Speed	Time
1	(Republic of Ireland) Michael Sweeney	600 cc Yamaha	117.070 mph	1:17.20.911
2	(England) Michael Russell	600 cc Yamaha	116.047 mph	1:18.01.810
3	(Scotland) Andrew Lawson	600 cc Kawasaki	115.805 mph	1:18.11.598
4	(England) Colin Stephenson	600 cc Yamaha	115.701 mph	1:18.15.819
5	(Northern Ireland) Stephen McKnight	600 cc Yamaha	115.605 mph	1:18.19.712
6	(England) Michael Moulai	600 cc Suzuki	115.554 mph	1:18.21.788
7	(England) Stephen Harper	675 cc Triumph	115.437 mph	1:18.26.548
8	(England) Rob Hodson	600 cc Yamaha	114.994 mph	1:18.44.702
9	(England) Tim Poole	600 cc Suzuki	114.686 mph	1:18.57.404
10	(England) Anthony Redmond	600 cc Honda	110.870 mph	1:19.04.580

Fastest Lap; James Cowton 119.659 mph (18 minutes 55.123 secs)

==== Race 6a; Super-Twin Race ====
Friday 30 August 2012 Mountain Course 2 laps – 75.46 miles (121.40 km) Reduced Race Distance.

- For motor-cycles exceeding 201 cc and not exceeding 650 cc Two-stroke Twin-cylinder motor-cycles

Rank	Rider	Team	Speed	Time
1	(England) Michael Russell	650 cc Kawasaki	107.895 mph	41' 57.777
2	(Republic of Ireland) Michael Sweeney	650 cc Kawasaki	107.869 mph	41' 58.390
3	(England) Rob Hodson	650 cc Kawasaki	107.193 mph	42' 32.571
4	(England) Colin Stephenson	650 cc Suzuki	105.832 mph	42' 46.870
5	(Northern Ireland) Stephen McKnight	650 cc Suzuki	105.814 mph	42' 47.308
6	(Scotland) Rab Davie	650 cc Kawasaki	103.547 mph	43' 14.327
7	(England) Garry Gittins	650 cc Suzuki	104.451 mph	43' 20.810
8	(England) Philip McGurk	650 cc Kawasaki	104.205 mph	43' 26.928
9	(Republic of Ireland) Andrew Farrell	650 cc Suzuki	104.197 mph	43' 27.128
10	(England) Nick Jefferies	650 cc Kawasaki	103.321 mph	43' 49.241

Fastest Lap: Michael Sweeney – 108.163 mph (20 minutes 55.767 secs)

== Gallery ==
Manx Grand Prix 2013
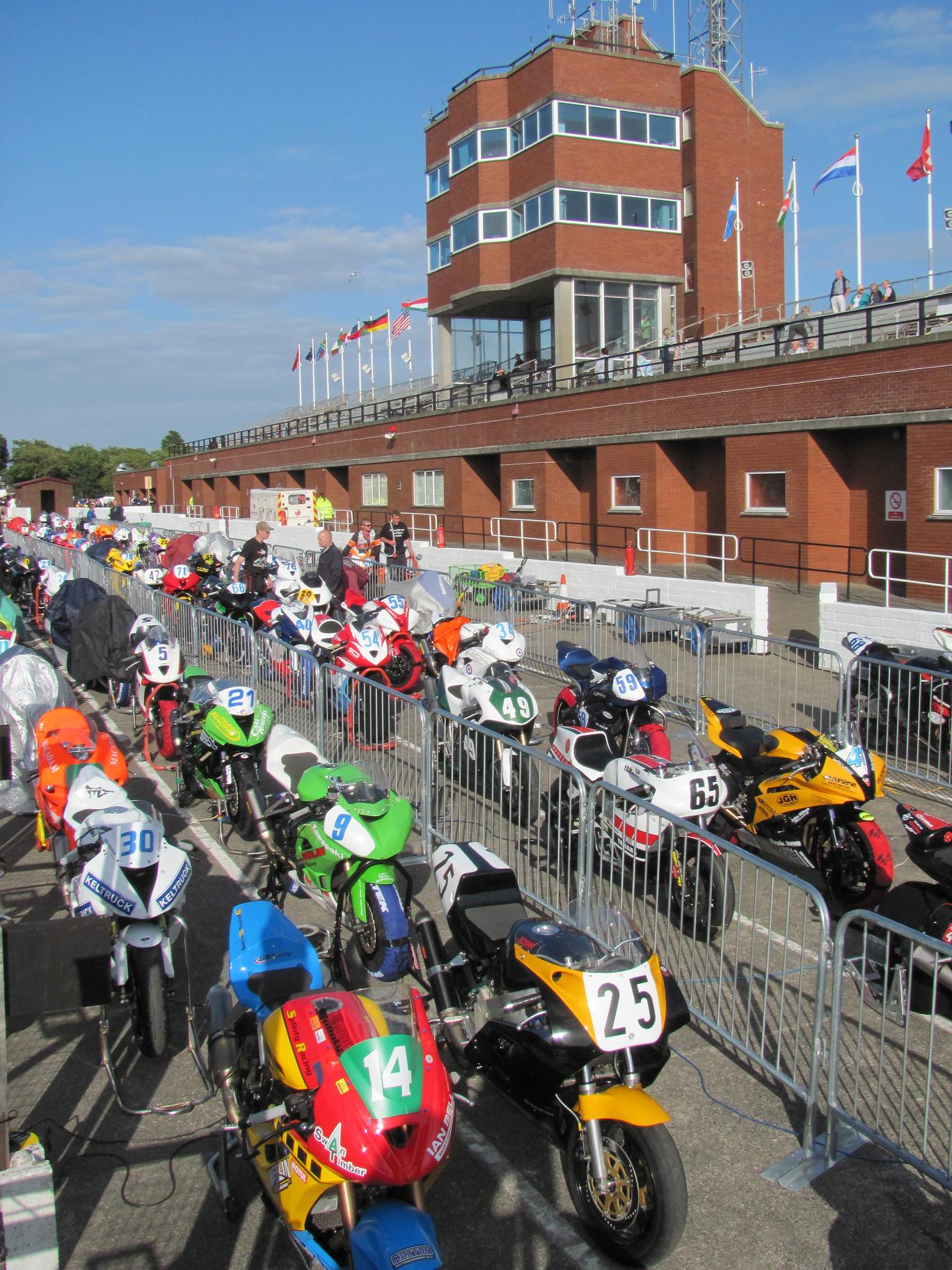
Pit-Lane, TT Grandstand 19 August 2013

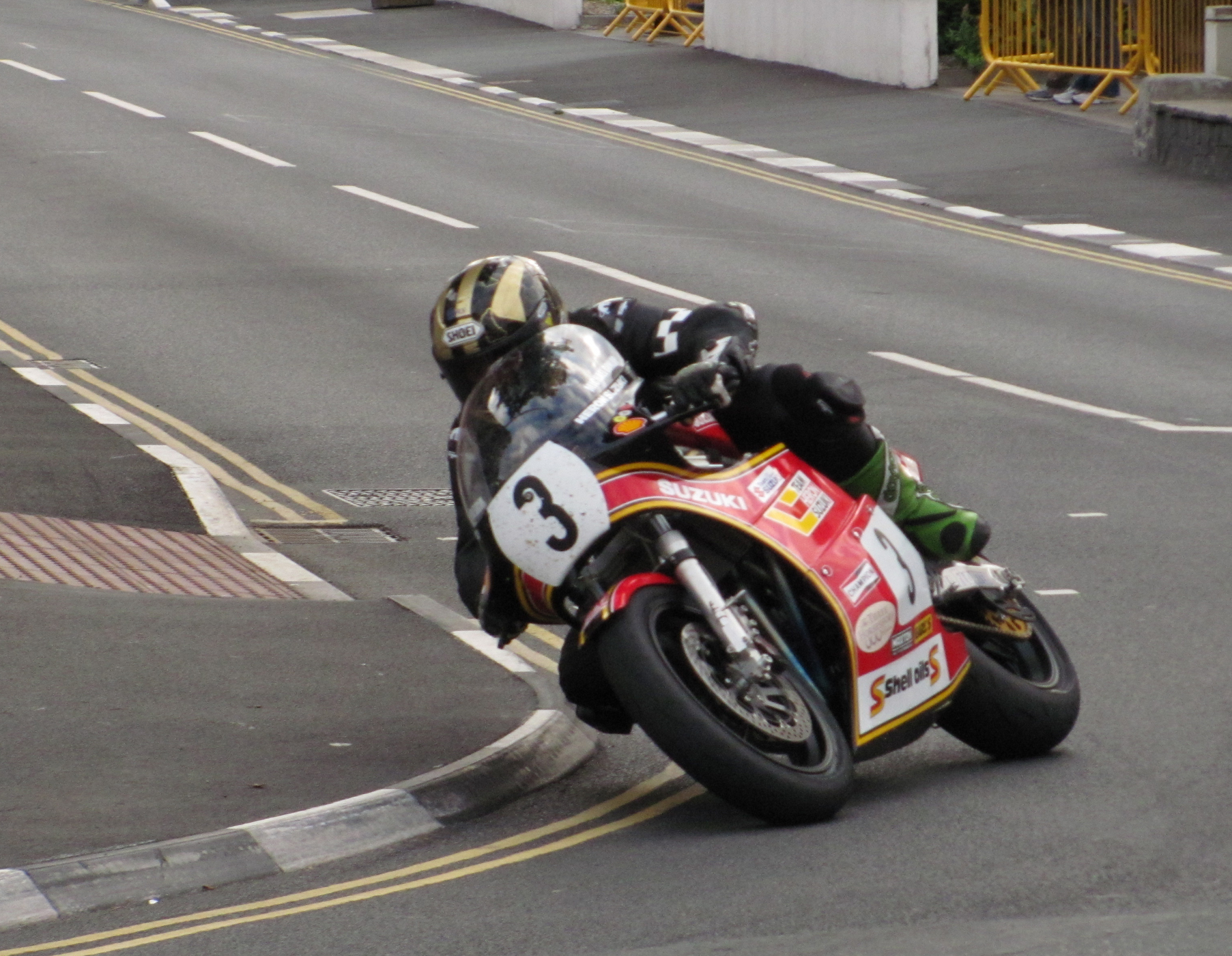
Michael Dunlop (3) Suzuki — Evening Practice Parliament Square, Ramsey 21 August 2013

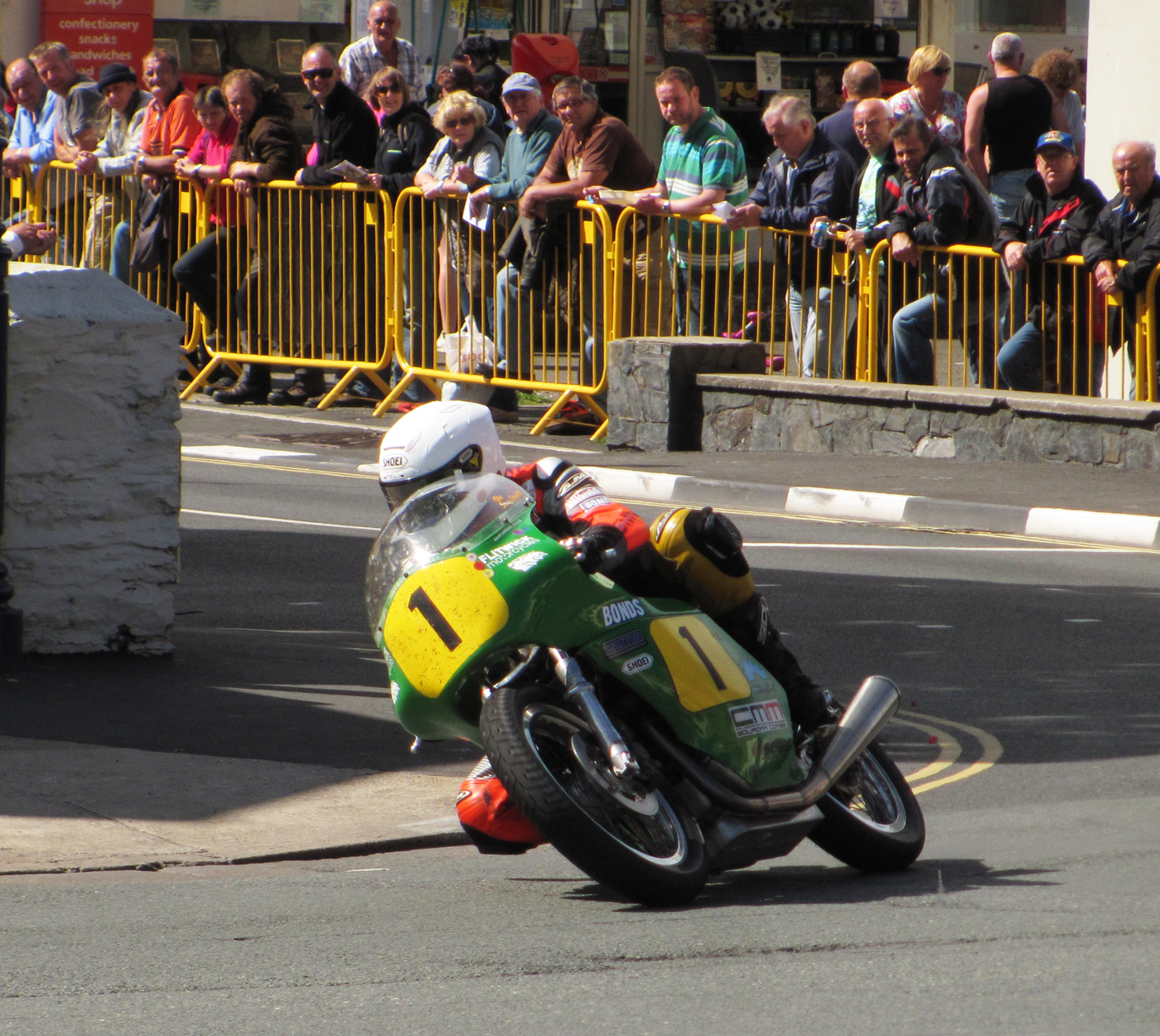
Ollie Linsdell (1) Paton 500c — Lap 4 500cc Classic TT Parliament Square, Ramsey 24 August 2013

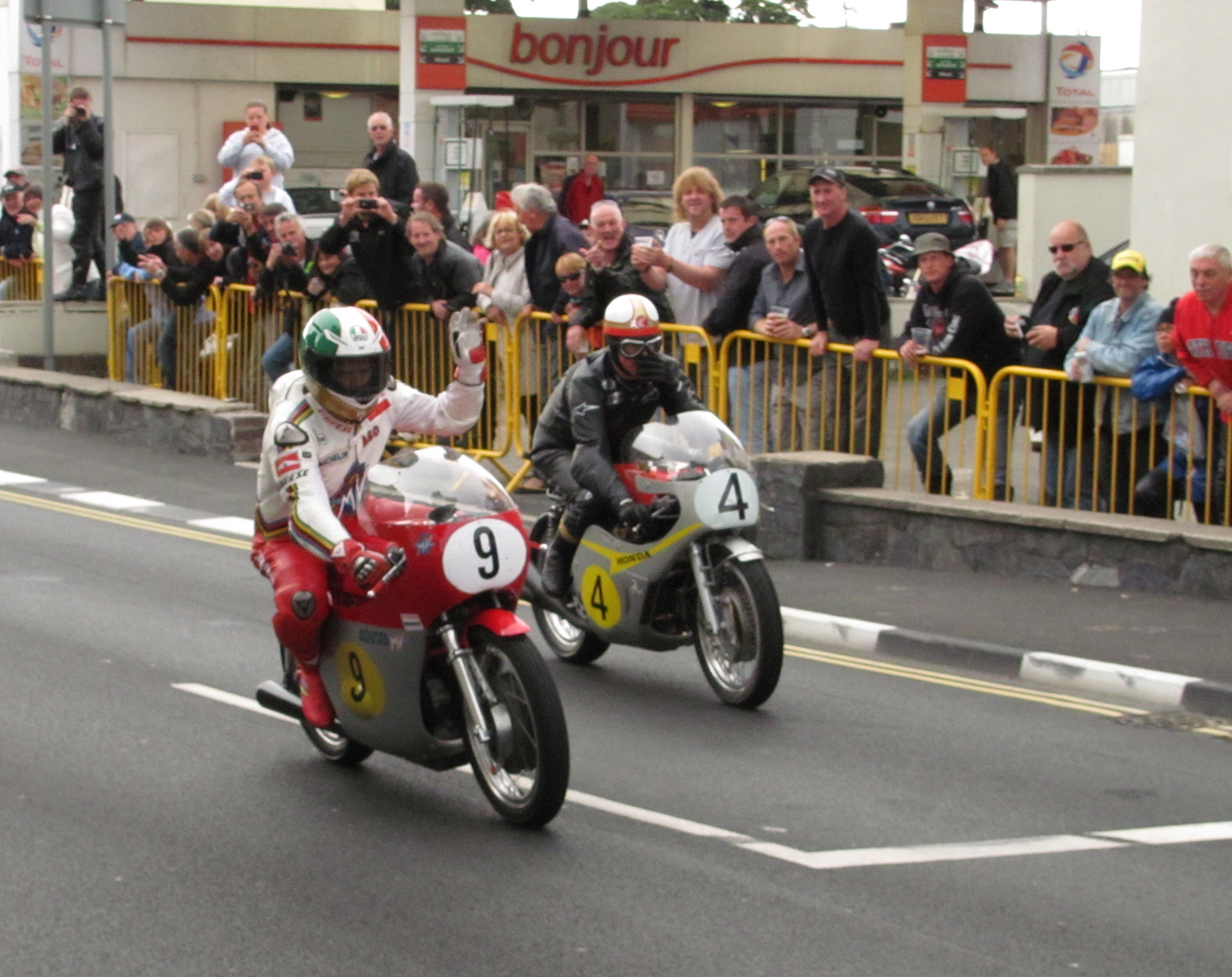
Giacomo Agostini (9) MV Agusta 500c John McGuinness 500cc Honda - Classic TT Parliament Square, Ramsey 24 August 2013

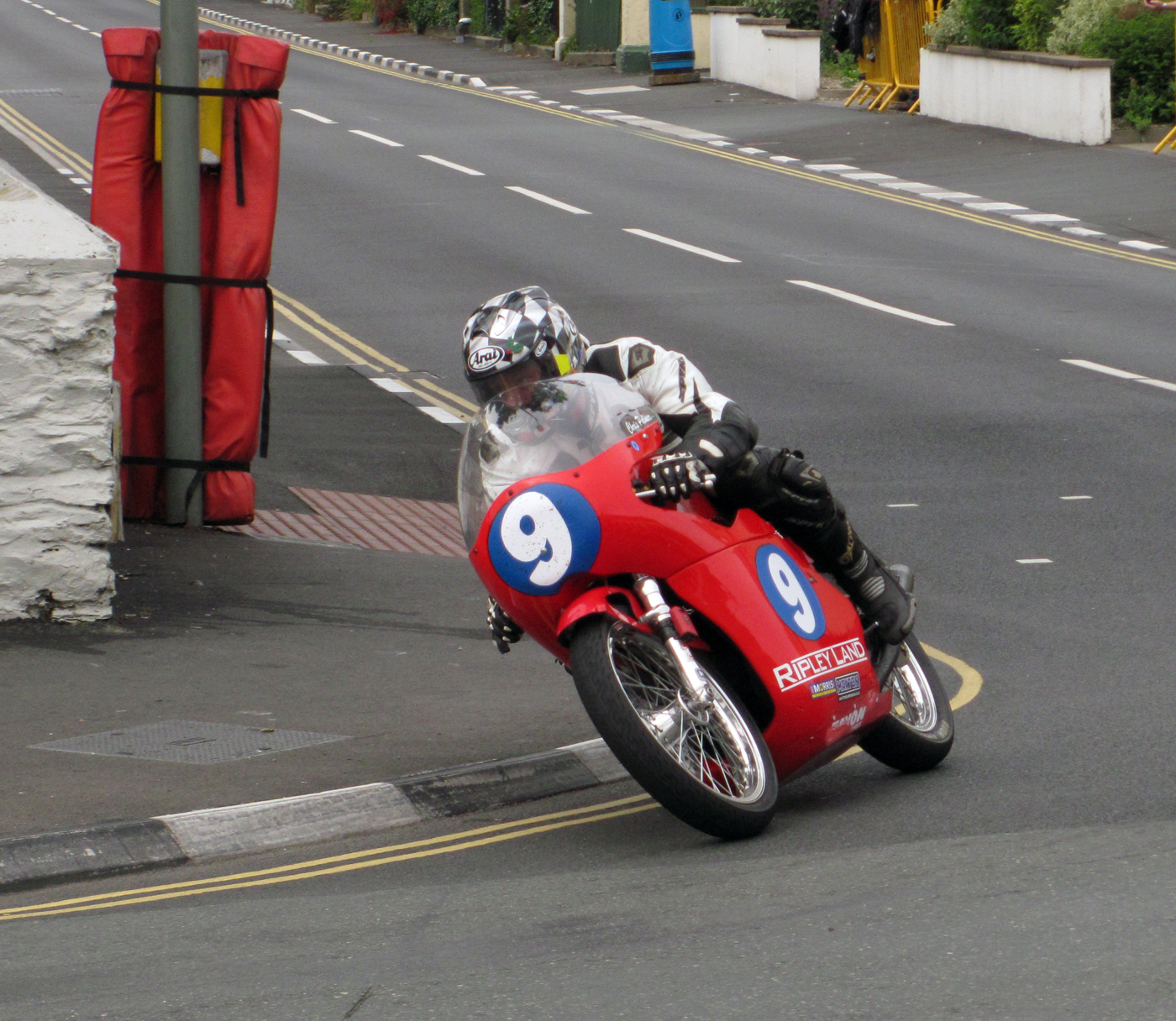
Chris Palmer (9) Honda - 350cc Classic TT Parliament Square, Ramsey 26 August 2013

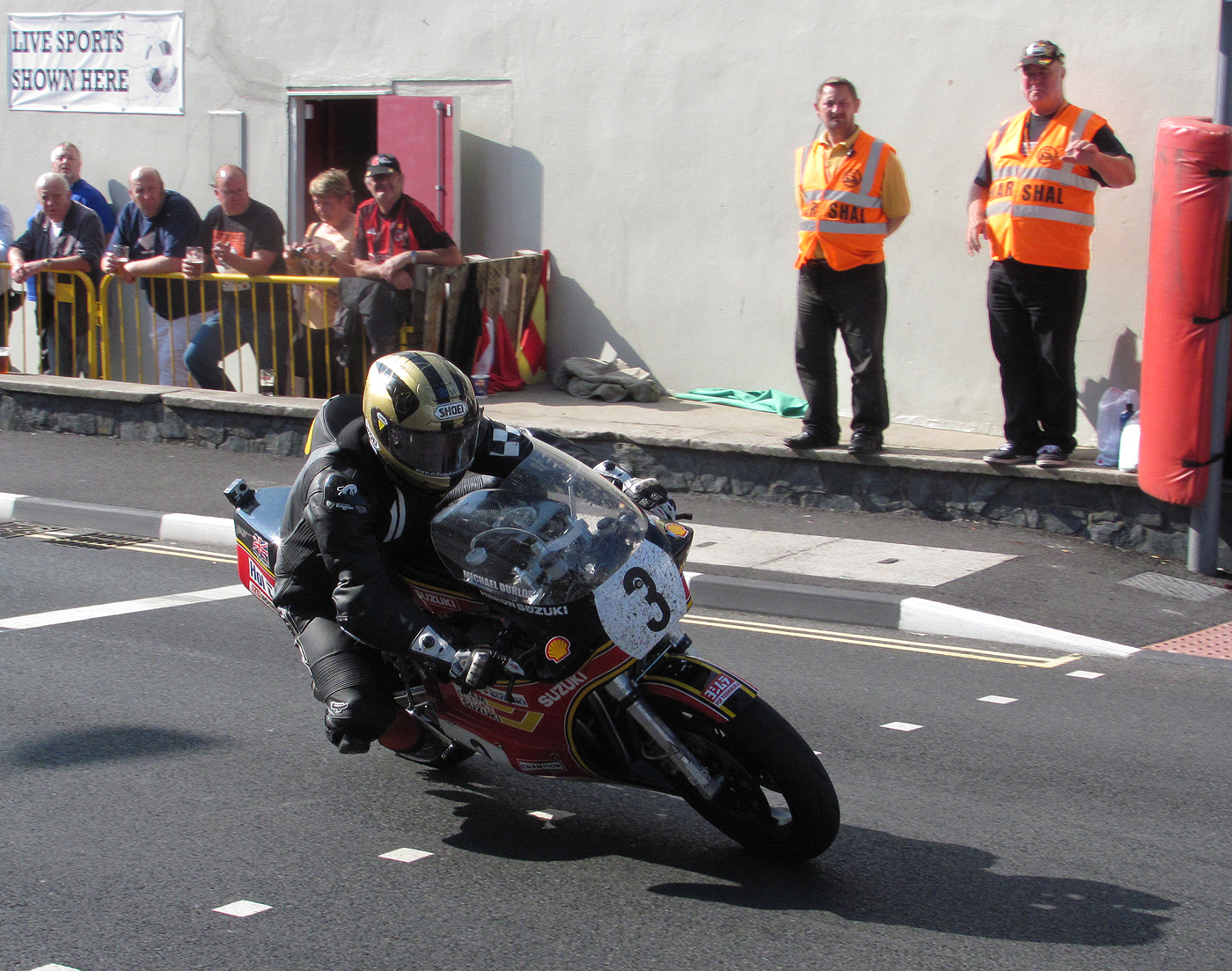
Michael Dunlop (3) Suzuki — Formula 1 Classic TT 2013 - Lap 3 Parliament Square, Ramsey 26 August 2013

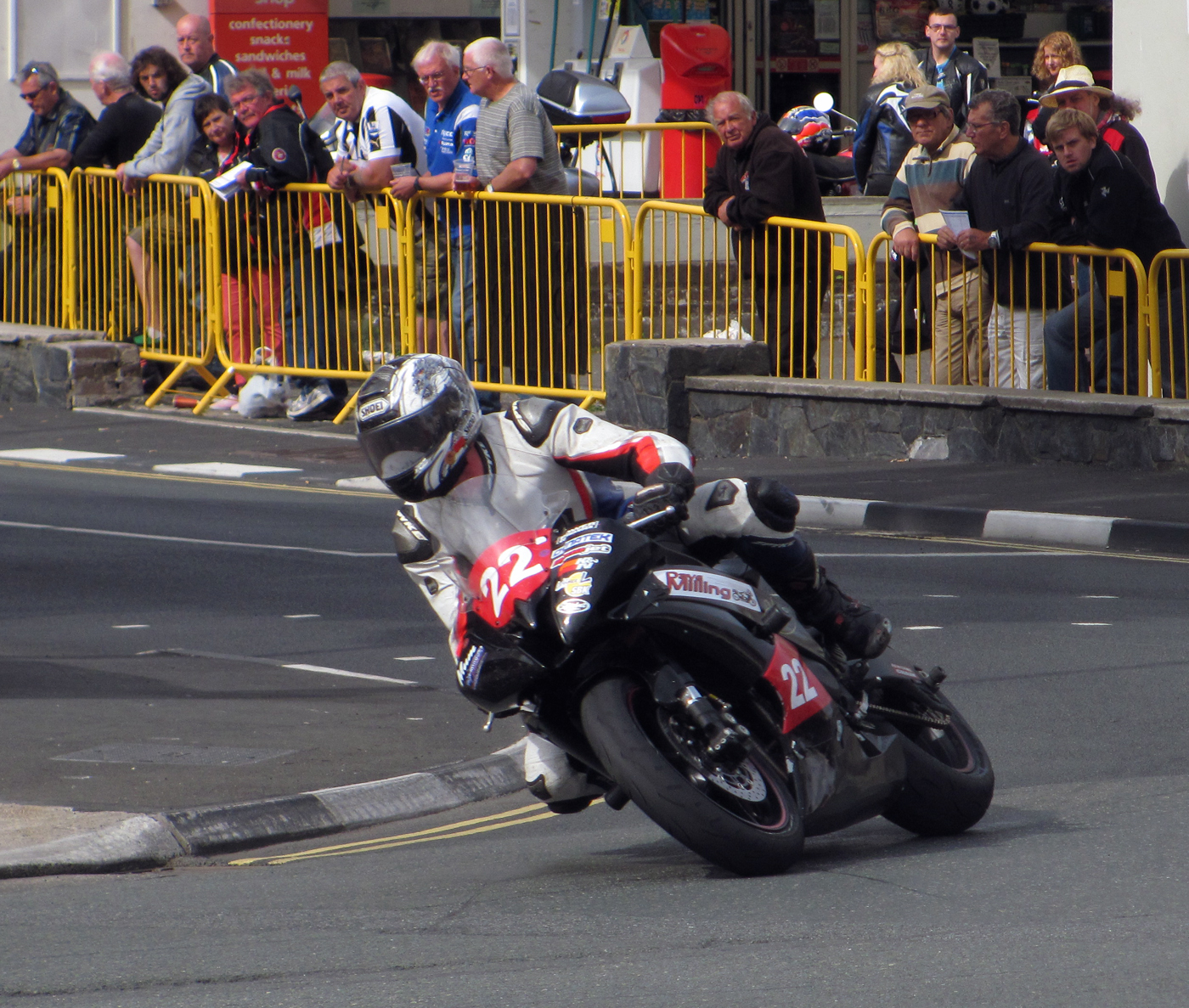
Christopher Dixon (22) Yamaha — Newcomers Race 'A' Manx Grand Prix 2013 - Lap 4 Parliament Square, Ramsey 28 August 2013
