= Suzuki GSX-R125 =

Sport bike

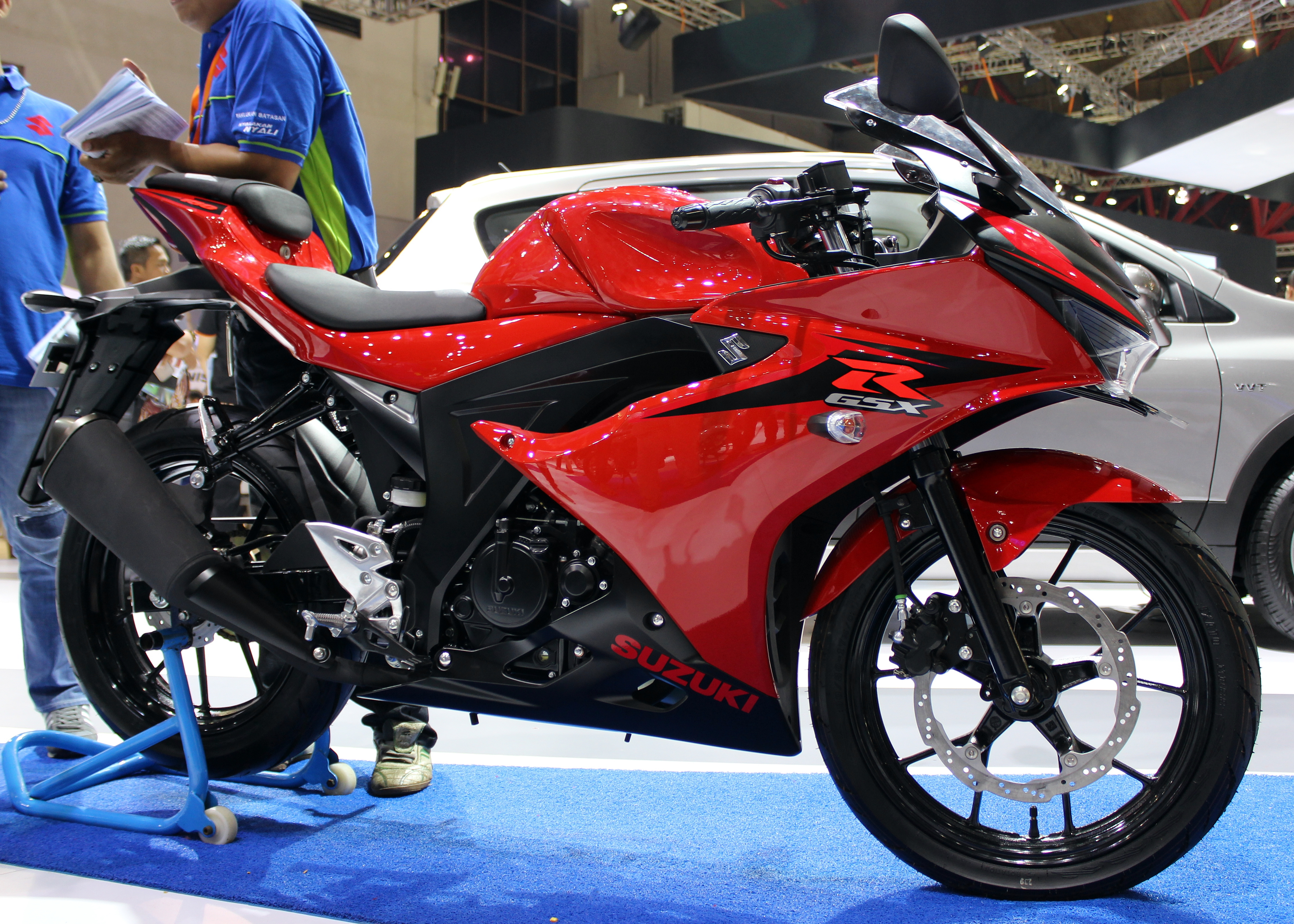
- Manufacturer: Suzuki
- Production: 2017-
- Class: Sport bike
- Engine: 124.4 cc (7.59 cu in) liquid-cooled 4-stroke 4-valve DOHC single-cylinder engine
- Bore / stroke: 62.0 mm × 41.2 mm (2.44 in × 1.62 in)
- Compression ratio: 11.2:1

The Suzuki GSX-R125 is a sport motorcycle produced by Suzuki as part of the GSX-R series of motorcycles. It has a liquid-cooled, single-cylinder, four-stroke engine with an output of 11 kW (15 hp). It can be ridden with a license from either class A1, B196 and Code111

== History ==
The GSX-R125 was presented at EICMA in late 2016 as a competitor to the Yamaha YZF-R125. It was Suzuki's first model in the 125cc class in 20 years. The motorcycle is equipped with Bosch ABS Type 10 and LED headlights. For 2021, Suzuki only changed the colour palette of the range and the following year updated the motorcycle to Euro 5 emissions standards.

The basis of the fully faired Suzuki GSX-R125 is identical to the GSX-S125, the 125cc naked bike offering from the brand, there are only differences in small details such as handlebars or ignition lock. This is also proven by the use of the same type code (HSN: 1699 TSN: AAB) in the KBA database, "GSX-R125, GSX-S125".
