= Digifant =

Engine component of the Volkswagen Group

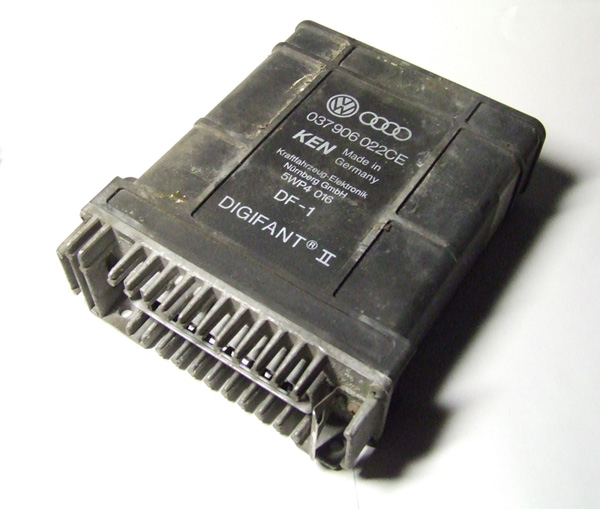
A Digifant II DF-1 Engine Control Unit used in '91 Volkswagen Golf Cabriolet (a Mk3 Golf) with 2E engine

Digifant is an engine management system operated by an engine control unit that actuates outputs, such as fuel injection and ignition systems, using information derived from sensor inputs, such as engine speed, exhaust oxygen and intake air flow. Digifant was designed by Volkswagen Group, in cooperation with Robert Bosch GmbH.

Digifant is the outgrowth of the Digijet fuel injection system first used on water-cooled Volkswagen A2 platform-based models.

== History ==
Digifant was introduced in 1986 on the 2.1 litre Volkswagen Type 2 (T3) (Vanagon in the US) engine. This system combined digital fuel control as used in the earlier Digijet systems with a new map controlled digital ignition system. Subsequently, Digifant II was introduced, adding ECU integrated knock control and idle stabilization, while externalizing an Ignition Control Unit (ICU). Digifant as used in Volkswagen Golf and Volkswagen Jetta models simplified several functions, and added knock sensor control to the ignition system. Other versions of Digifant appeared on the Volkswagen Fox, Corrado, Volkswagen Transporter (T4) (known as the Eurovan in North America), as well as 1993 and later production versions of the rear-engined Volkswagen Beetle, sold only in Mexico. Lower-power versions (without a knock sensor), supercharged, and 16-valve variants were produced. Nearly exclusive to the European market, Volkswagen AG subsidiary Audi AG also used the Digifant system, namely in its 2.0 E variants of the Audi 80 and Audi 100.

Digifant is an engine management system designed originally to take advantage of the first generation of newly developed digital signal processing circuits. Production changes and updates were made to keep the system current with the changing California and federal emissions requirements. Updates were also made to allow integration of other vehicle systems into the scope of engine operation.

Changes in circuit technology, design and processing speed along with evolving emissions standards, resulted in the development of new engine management systems. These new system incorporated adaptive learning fuzzy logic, enhanced and expanded diagnostics, and the ability to meet total vehicle emissions standards.

== Features ==
Fuel injection control is digitally electronic. It is based on the measurement engine load (this signal is provided by the Air Flow Sensor), and on engine speed (signal provided by the Hall sender in the distributor). These primary signals are compared to a 'map', or table of values, stored in the ECU memory.

The amount of fuel delivered is controlled by the duration of actuation of the fuel injector(s). This value is taken from a programme in the ECU that has 16 points for load and 16 points for speed. These 256 primary values are then modified by coolant temperature, intake air temperature, oxygen content of the exhaust, car battery voltage and throttle position - to provide 65,000 possible injector duration points.

Digifant is unlike the earlier CIS and CIS-E fuel injection systems that it replaced, in that fuel injectors are mounted on a common fuel rail. CIS fuel injection systems used mechanical fuel injectors. The fuel injectors are wired in parallel, and are supplied with Constant System Voltage. The ECU switches the earth/ground on and off to control duration. All injectors operate at the same time (simultaneously, rather than sequentially) each crankshaft revolution; two complete revolutions being needed for each cylinder to receive the correct amount of fuel for each combustion cycle.

Ignition system control is also digital electronic. The sensors that supply the engine load and engine speed signals for injector duration provide information about the basic ignition timing point. The signal sent to the Ignition Control Unit (if not integrated into the ECU) is derived from a programme in the ECU that is similar to the injector duration programme.

Engine knock control is used to allow the ignition timing to continually approach the point of detonation. This is the point where the engine will produce the most motive power, as well as the highest efficiency.

Additional functions of the ECU include operation of the fuel pump by closing the Ground for the fuel pump relay, and control of idle speed by a throttle plate bypass valve. The Idle Air Control Valve (IACV) (previously known as an Idle Air Stabiliser Valve - IASV), receives a changing milliamp signal that varies the strength of an electromagnet pulling open the bypass valve.

Idle speed stabilisation is enhanced by a process known as Idle Speed Control (ISC). This function (previously known as Digital Idle Stabilization), allows the ECU to modify ignition timing at idle to further improve idle quality.

== Digifant II inputs/outputs ==
The 25 pin electronic control unit used in the Golf and Jetta receives inputs from the following sources:

- Hall sender unit (provides engine speed signal)
- Air Flow Sensor (provides engine load information)
- Coolant temperature sensor
- Intake Air Temperature sensor
- Knock sensor

Additional signals used as inputs are:

- Air conditioner (compressor on)
- Car battery voltage
- Starter motor signal

Digifant system inputs/outputs

- power steering pump (supplying pressure)

The Anti-lock Braking System (ABS), three-speed automatic transmission, and vehicle speed sensor are not linked to this system.

Outputs controlling engine operation include:

- Fuel injectors
- Idle Air Control Valve
- Ignition Control Unit
- Fuel pump relay
- Oxygen sensor heater

== Additional systems ==
The evaporative emission system is controlled by a vacuum-operated mechanical carbon canister control valve. Fuel pressure is maintained by a vacuum operated mechanical fuel pressure regulator on the fuel injector rail assembly. Inputs and outputs are shown in the following illustration. Digifant II as used on Golf and Jetta vehicles provides the basis for this chart.

== North America variants ==
In North America, Volkswagen released two other versions of the Digifant fuel injection system (in addition to standard Digifant II described above).

A limited number of 1987-1990 California Golf and Jetta models are equipped with Digifant II that features an on-board diagnostics system (OBD). These vehicles have 'blink code' capacity to store up to five Diagnostic Trouble Codes (DTCs). Diagnostic troubleshooting is done by pressing the Check Engine switch on the dashboard. This system can also have carbon monoxide (CO), ignition timing and idle speed adjusted to baseline values.

In 1991, California Golf, Jetta, Fox, Cabriolet and Corrado vehicles were equipped with expanded OBD capabilities. This version was renamed "Digifant I". These later Digifant versions have 38-pin ECUs with Rapid Data Transfer and permanent DTC memory. All Eurovans with Digifant also have rapid data transfer and permanent DTC memory. These systems use a throttle plate potentiometer to track throttle plate position in place of the idle and full throttle switches used on earlier systems.

Another characteristic of Digifant II equipped vehicles in California is a switch mount on the dashboard which has a "Check Engine" symbol. Digifant I models in California feature a Check Engine light, with the display of codes done by a special Volkswagen tool under the shift boot, or by a jumper and an LED by the home mechanic.

== Reliability ==
Vehicles using engines equipped with Digifant fuel injection typically operated both efficiently and smoothly when new but suffered from a number of issues as the car aged, even by a few months. Digifant sensors & other components, especially the ECU itself, were remarkably sensitive to poor electrical grounding. Without a reliable ground signal to reference, the system was vulnerable to errors and malfunction. In the 1980s and 1990s many Volkswagen / Audi designs did not incorporate sufficient engine compartment grounding, and when the car's engine compartment became soiled with dirt, oil & road salts from several months / years of use, the fuel injection system would fail in often inexplicable ways. Backfiring, stalls & other poor running were all too common. Later versions were improved by providing multiple grounding paths, but the early Digifant systems suffered poor service reputations.

Most of driveability issues can be traced back to a few issues:

- Bad ECU earth/ground
- Bad oxygen/lambda sensor earth/ground
- Faulty Engine Coolant Temperature sensor (ECT)

The engine coolant temperature sensor is located in the coolant flange,(under the distributor on the Polo Fox Coupe) on the front of the cylinder head (on transverse-engine vehicles). The bad earth/ground can be traced to an essential ground strap on the front upper transmission bolt. Without this, the ECU tends to earth/ground elsewhere, causing a specific trace to burn out on the circuit board and killing the ECU. This causes the injectors to stay open constantly, flooding the engine.

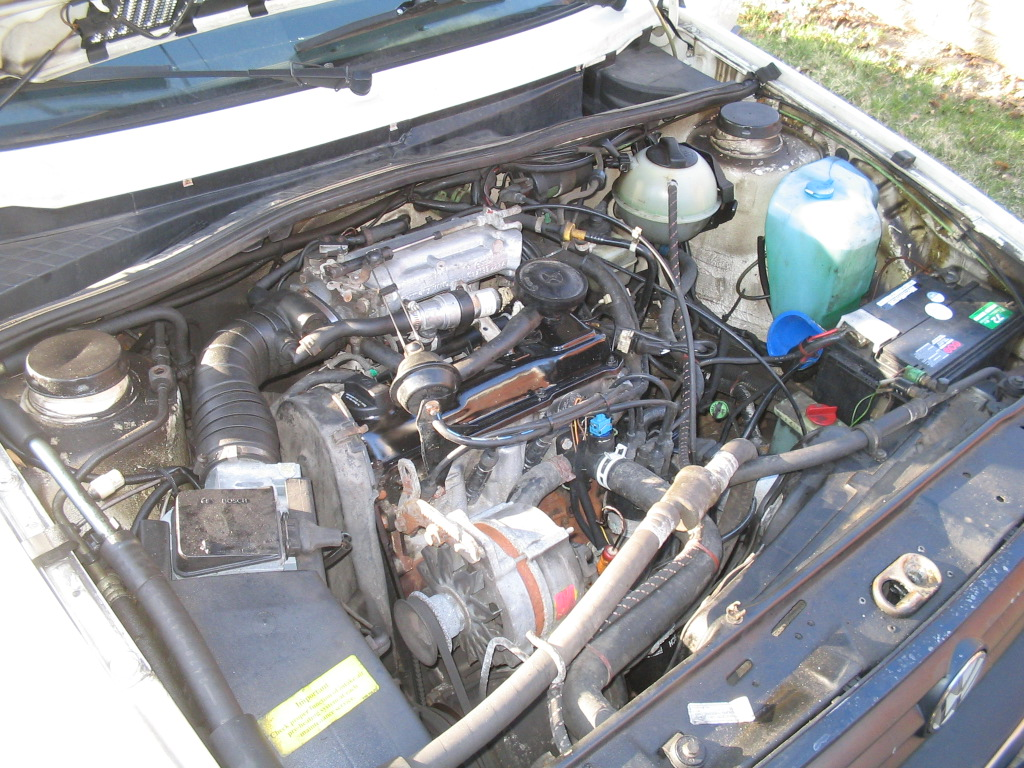
1990 Jetta GL with Digifant engine management

== See also ==
- Jetronic
- Motronic
