= Suzuki Raider 150 =

Suzuki Raider R150
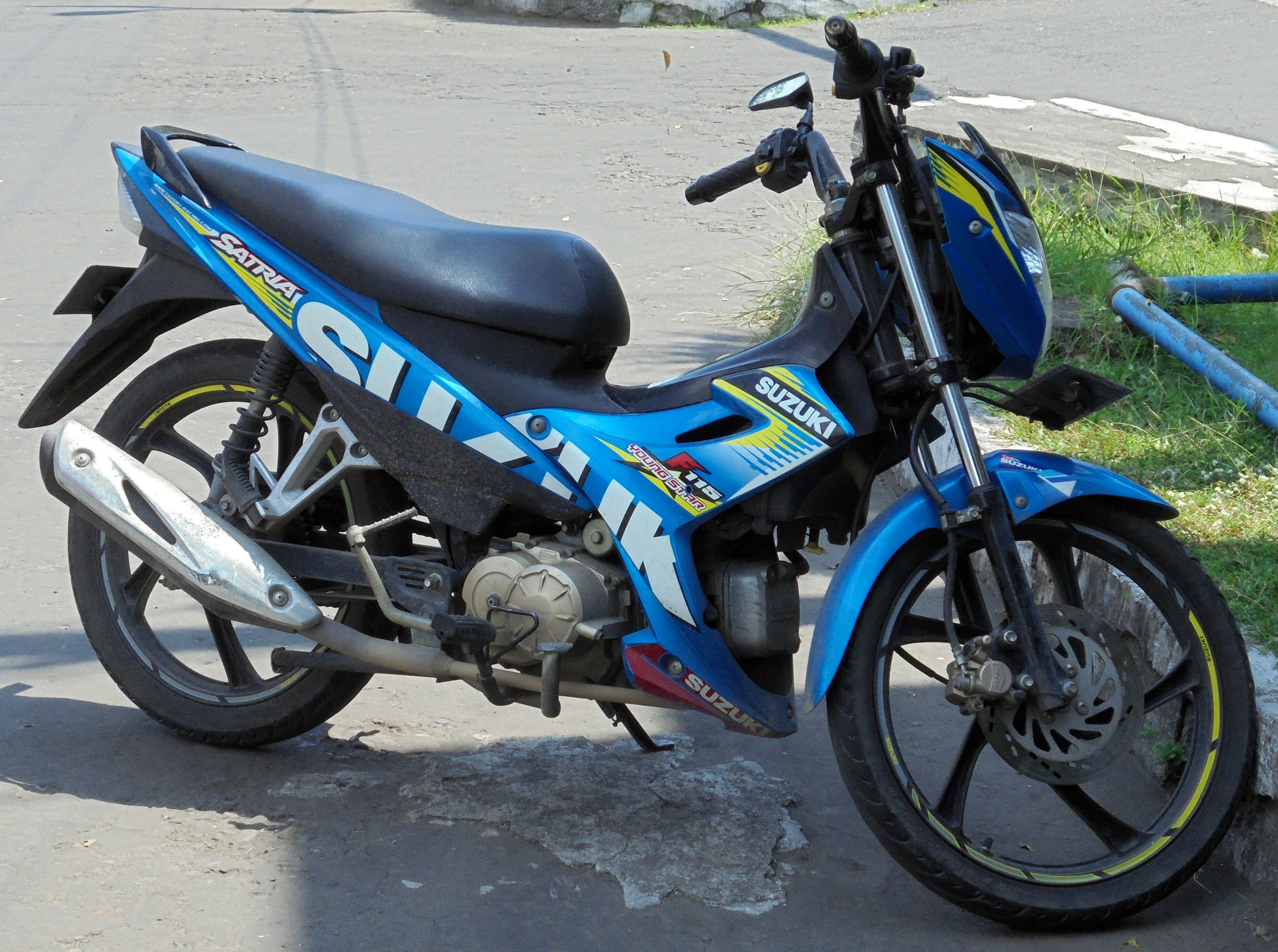
- Manufacturer: Suzuki
- Also called: Suzuki Satria F150 (Indonesia and Vietnam); Suzuki Belang R150 (Malaysia)
- Production: 2003–present
- Assembly: Thailand; Indonesia; Vietnam; Philippines
- Related: FXR150; FX125; Raider 125; GSX R125/150; GSX150 Bandit; GSX S125/150

The Suzuki Raider R150 or Suzuki Satria F150 and Suzuki Belang R150 in Malaysia uses the 150 cc (9.2 cu in) DOHC four-valve single-cylinder engine based from Suzuki FXR150, with a six-speed transmission. The frame, rear swing arm, rear suspension, seat and front brakes are redesigned from the Suzuki FX125 chassis, making it more aerodynamic.

The main features are full-length front shock, rear monoshock suspension, six-speed short gear ratio transmission, dual camshaft engine, lightweight chassis construction, alloy cast wheel, large-diameter front disc brake, and a rear disc brake, which is rarely found in underbones.

== First Generation (2003) ==
=== 2003–2008 ===
The first generation Suzuki Raider R150 was assembled in Thailand together with the closely related Raider 125. Its engine is carried over from the earlier FXR150 sport bike from Malaysia which has the same DOHC oil-cooled engine. The carburettor is changed to 26 mm, down from 29 mm originally in the FXR150, and power was detuned from 20 PS to 16.5 PS. Suzuki then redesigned the FX125 chassis and made it on an underbone category. The Raider R150 was launched in 2004 in the Philippines, also in Indonesia as Satria F150 replacing 2-stroke Satria 120R, this model was exported from Thailand to other markets in South East Asia. Due to its popularity, this model was also assembled in Indonesia (CKD) starting from 2007.

=== 2008–2013 ===
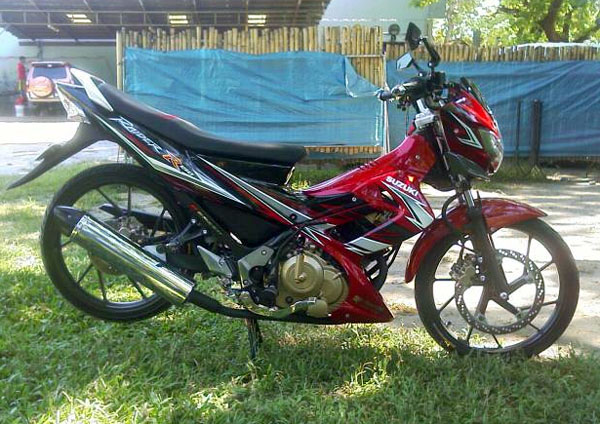
Suzuki Raider 150 (first facelift)

In 2008, the Raider got its first facelift and moved the assembling completely to Indonesia. Suzuki Raider R150 got a slight makeover in its design, the most notable change was headlight has changed inspired by that of the GSX-R600/750 superbikes. The Raider 150 was released in 2009 for the Malaysian market as the Suzuki Belang R150 until 2013. The Raider R150 was released in 2013 for the Vietnamese market.

=== 2013–2016 ===
The second facelift arrived in 2013 with new bodywork on the headlights and sharper body style. In 2015, the model got reworked to meet the Euro-3 emission standard. This model also produced in Philippines and as of its present day, and the model are still available along with the new FI model.

== Second Generation (2016) ==
The second generation Raider 150 was introduced in 2016, with totally new design, new digital speedometer, LED headlights, reworked engine with fuel-injection and with liquid-cooled cooling system. This engine also shared with the GSX-R150, albeit with different gear ratios in the transmission, different injectors and different tuning in the ECM. This generation also assembled with CKD kits from Indonesia in Vietnam as Raider R150 and sold together with the fully imported Indonesian built Satria F150.

== Specifications ==
| Year | 2003–present | 2016–present |
Engine & transmission
| Layout | 4-stroke 4-valve DOHC single-cylinder | |
| Capacity | 147.3 cc (8.99 cu in) | |
| Bore × stroke | 62.0 mm × 48.8 mm (2.44 in × 1.92 in) | |
| Compression rato | 10.2:1 | 11.5:1 |
| Cooling system | Oil-cooled | Liquid-cooled |
| Carburation | Carburetor | Fuel injection |
| Starter | Electric and kick | |
| Max. power | 16.5 PS (12.1 kW; 16.3 hp) @ 9,500 rpm | 18.5 PS (13.6 kW; 18.2 hp) @ 10,000 rpm |
| Max. torque | 12.45 N⋅m (9.18 lbf⋅ft) @ 8,500 rpm | 13.8 N⋅m (10.2 lbf⋅ft) @ 8,500 rpm |
| Transmission | 6-speed constant-mesh | |
| Final drive | Chain | |
Cycle parts & suspension
| Frame | Steel twin-spar diamond | |
| Front suspension | Conventional telescopic fork | |
| Front tyre | 70/90–17 | |
| Front brakes | Single disc brake with 2-piston caliper | |
| Rear suspension | Steel swingarm with monoshock | |
| Rear tyre | 80/90–17 | |
| Rear brakes | Single disc brake with 1-piston caliper | |
Dimensions
| Length | 1,940 mm (76.4 in) | 1,960 mm (77.2 in) |
| Width | 652 mm (25.7 in) | 675 mm (26.6 in) |
| Height | 941 mm (37.0 in) | 980 mm (38.6 in) |
| Wheelbase | 1,280 mm (50.4 in) | |
| Weight | 95 kg (209 lb) | 109 kg (240 lb) |
| Fuel capacity | 4.9 L (1.1 imp gal; 1.3 US gal) | 4.0 L (0.88 imp gal; 1.1 US gal) |
