= Suzuki FX125 =

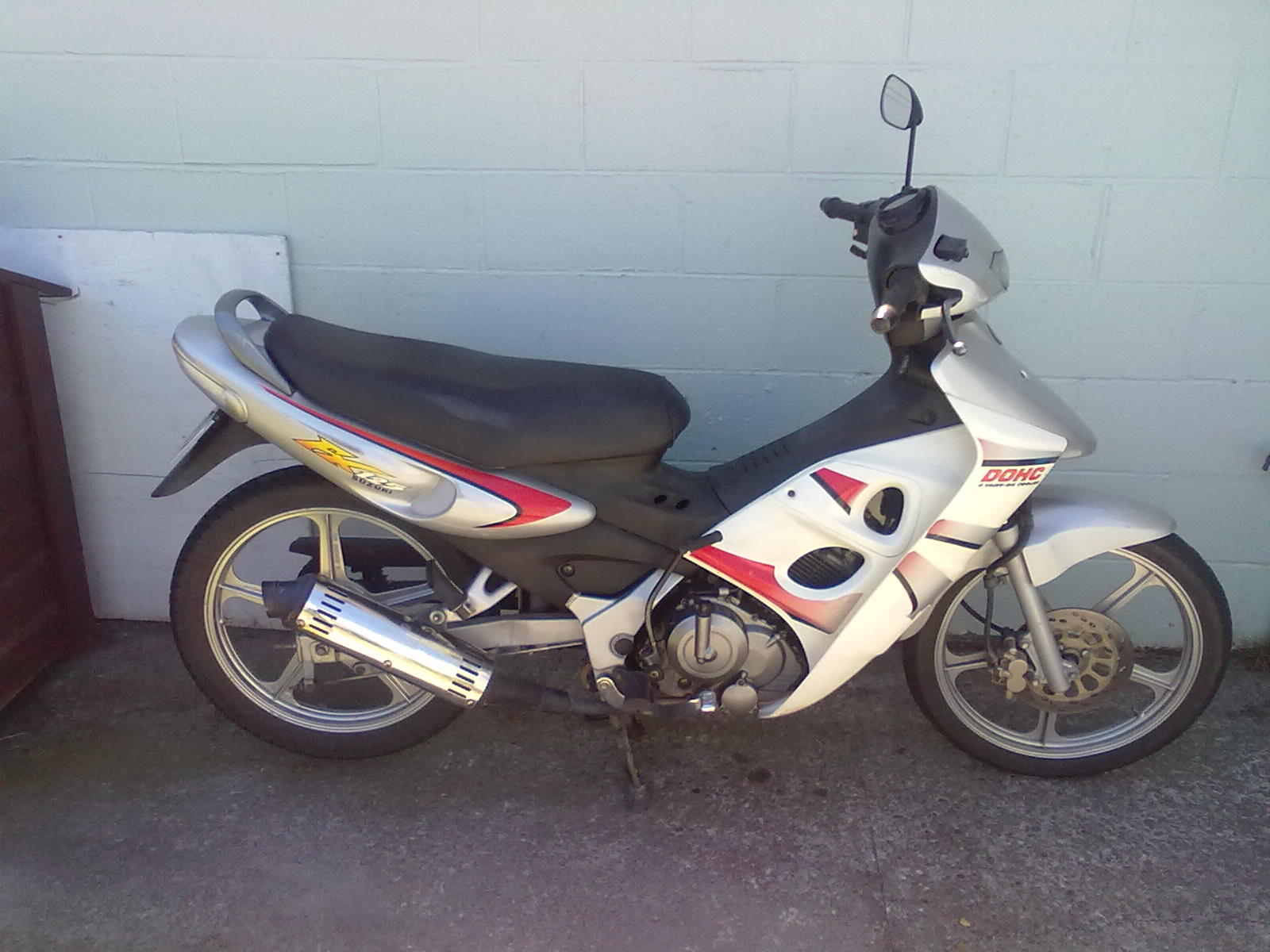
- Suzuki FX125
- Manufacturer: Suzuki
- Also called: Suzuki FU125
- Production: 2000 - present
- Class: Underbone
- Engine: Type 4 Stroke, DOHC, oil-cooled, generating 13.3 hp/ps(factory claimed)
- Transmission: 5 speed manual
- Brakes: Front: Front disc, four piston caliper Rear: drum
- Dimensions: L: 1.955 m (6 ft 5.0 in); W: 0.68 m (2 ft 3 in); H: 1.080 m (3 ft 6.5 in)
- Fuel capacity: 4.6 L
- Related: Suzuki FXR150 and Suzuki Raider 150

The Suzuki FX125 is an underbone motorcycle manufactured in Malaysia from 1998, with a powerful four-stroke engine. It was sold mostly in Malaysia and Vietnam, and in small numbers in New Zealand and Greece.

It uses a five-speed 125 cc (7.6 cu in) DOHC four-valve single-cylinder engine. This engine is of the same design as the 150 cc (9.2 cu in) engine which powers the Suzuki FXR150 sports bike and another underbone, the Suzuki Raider 150. The engine features Suzuki Advanced Cooling System, in which oil as well as air is used to cool the engine. To cool the oil, the engine is fitted with an external oil cooler.

Unlike the FXR150 and Raider 150, which have a six-speed manual transmission, the FX125 and Raider 125 engines have a five-speed short gear ratio manual transmission. The frame, rear suspension, seat, front wheel and front brakes are identical to that of the Raider 150. Other features include rear monoshock rear suspension, lightweight chassis construction, 17-inch alloy cast wheels (or, on some FX125s, spoked wheels) and a front disc brake, most of which are rarely found in underbones. The dash unit has an analogue speedometer and indicator lights for the turn signal, high beam, top gear and neutral.

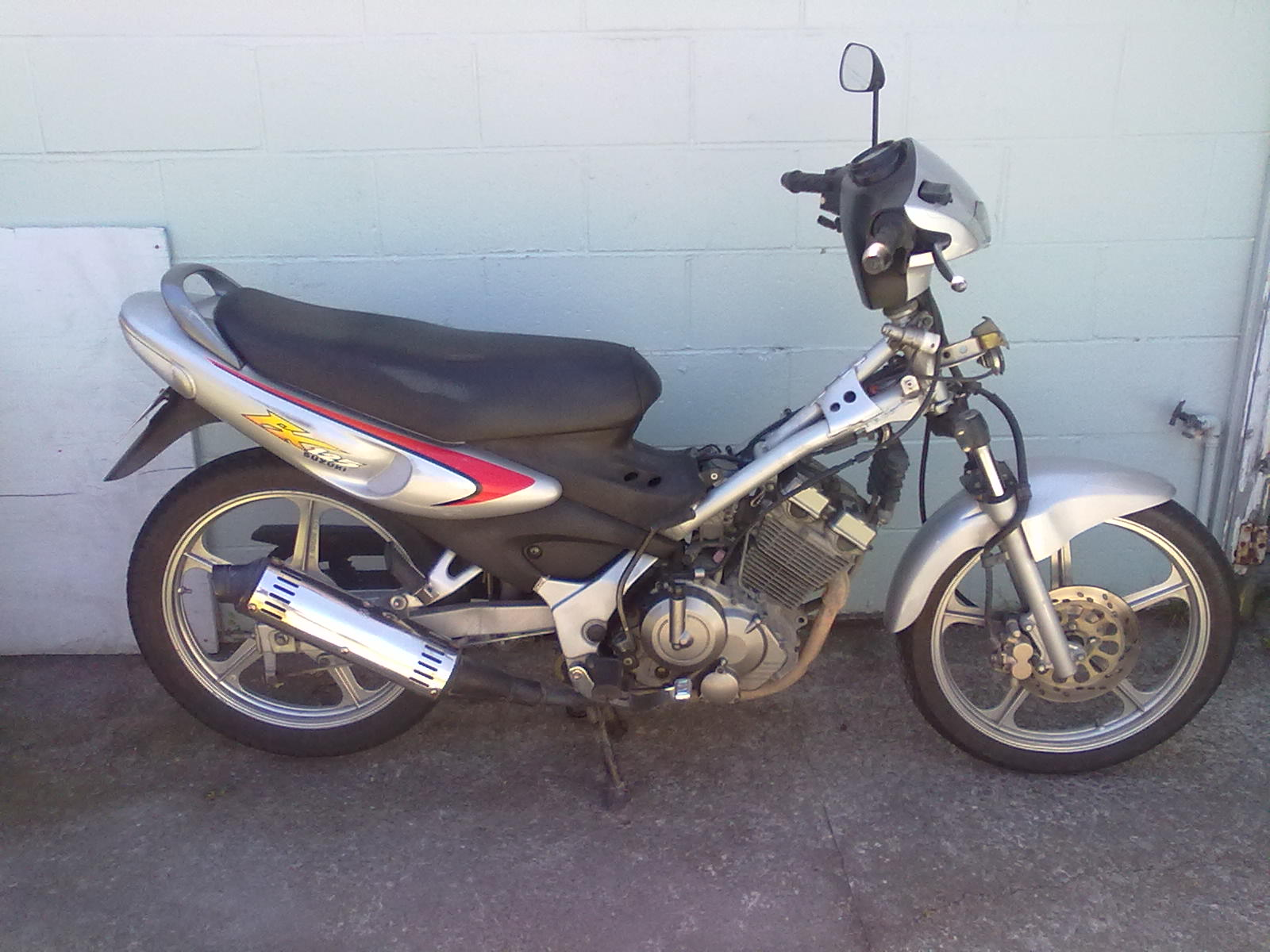
A Suzuki FX125 with covers removed

== Technical data ==
DIMENSIONS
Overall length	1955 mm
Overall width	680 mm
Overall height	1080 mm
Engine	Specification
Engine type	Air - Oil Cooled, DOHC 4-Valve, 4-Stroke
Bore × stroke	57.0 × 48.8 mm
Carburetor	MIKUNI BS26SS
Displacement	124.5 cc
Compression ratio	10.2 : 1
Starting system	Kick and electric
Maximum horsepower	13.3 hp @ 10,500 RPM
Lubrication system	SACS (Suzuki Advanced Cooling System)
Fuel tank capacity	4.2 L
Fuel consumption	3.0 Lt/100 km
Chassis and suspension
Chassis	Twin-Spar Underbone
Suspension, Front	Telescopic Coil Spring, Oil-damped Fork x 2
Suspension, Rear	Mono Shock, Coil Spring, Oil-damped w/preload adjustment
Brakes - Front	Disc brake w/twin piston caliper
Brakes - Rear	Drum brake
