= Yamaha YZF-R125 =

Sport motorcycle made since 2008

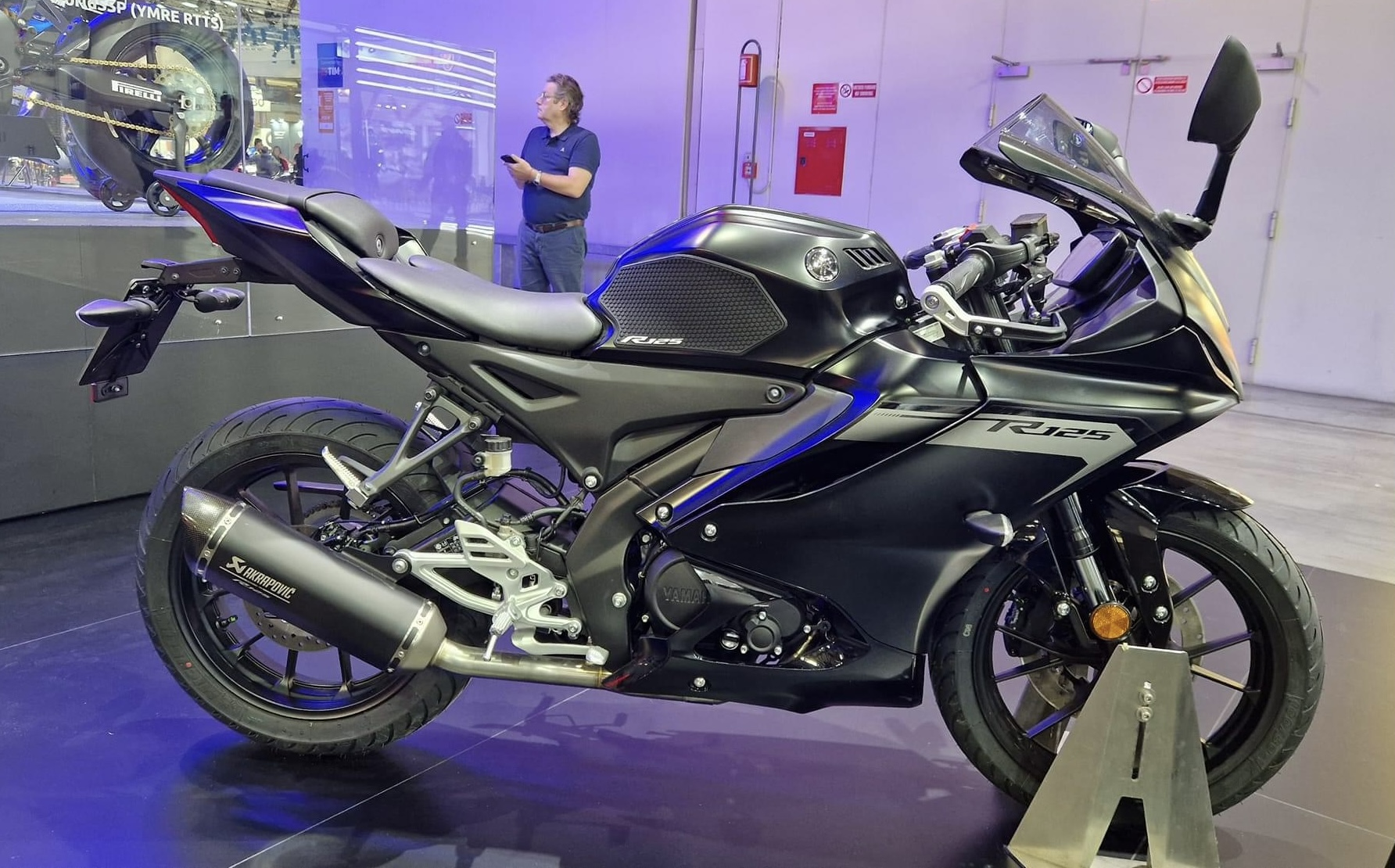
- 2025 Yamaha R125
- Manufacturer: Yamaha Motor Company
- Also called: Yamaha R125
- Production: 2008–present
- Predecessor: Yamaha TZR125
- Class: Sport bike
- Engine: 124.7 cc (7.61 cu in) liquid-cooled 4-stroke 4-valve SOHC single-cylinder engine
- Bore / stroke: 52.0 mm × 58.6 mm (2.05 in × 2.31 in)
- Compression ratio: 11.2:1
- Ignition type: TCI
- Transmission: 6-speed constant mesh, wet, multiple-disc coil spring clutch, chain drive
- Frame type: Steel twin-spar Deltabox
- Suspension: Front: 41 mm inverted fork Rear: Swingarm (link type)
- Brakes: Hydraulic disc; front: 292 mm floating disc Rear: 230 mm
- Tires: Front: 100/80-17; Rear: 130/70-17 (2008-2013) 140/70-17 (2014+)
- Rake, trail: 25°, 89 mm (3.5 in)
- Wheelbase: 1,325 mm (52.2 in)
- Dimensions: L: 1,990 mm (78 in); W: 755 mm (29.7 in); H: 1,140 mm (45 in)
- Seat height: 820 mm (32 in)
- Fuel capacity: 11.0 L (2.4 imp gal; 2.9 US gal)
- Oil capacity: 1.15 L (0.25 imp gal; 0.30 US gal)

The Yamaha YZF-R125 is a sport motorcycle designed by Yamaha and manufactured by MBK Industrie since 2008. In 2023 the model is in its fourth generation.

== First generation: (2008–2013) ==
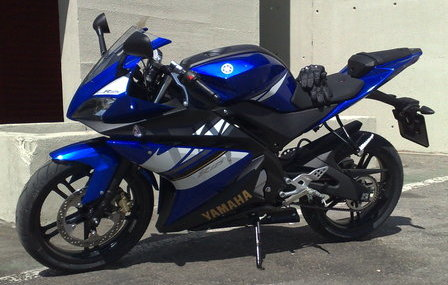
1st generation Yamaha R125

In 2008, the bike initially came available as a four stroke replacement for the TZR125. Entering the thin market of small displacement 4-stroke sport bikes, it quickly gained traction and became a popular choice for young riders.

=== Specifications ===
Specifications for EU version.

Dimensions	Overall length	2015 mm
Dimensions	Overall width	660 mm
Dimensions	Overall height	1065 mm
Dimensions	Seat height	815 mm
Dimensions	Wheelbase	1355 mm
Dimensions	Ground clearance	155 mm
Dimensions	Turning radius	3100 mm
Dimensions	Fork leg diameter	33 mm
Front brake	Disc	Fixed, 292 mm
Front brake	Caliper	Floating, 2 piston, axial mount
Engine	Type	Liquid cooled, 4-stroke, SOHC
Engine	Displacement	124.7 cc
Engine	Bore x Stroke	52.0 x 58.6 mm
Engine	Compression ratio	11.2 : 1
Engine	Fuel consumption	(Approximately) 3.0 L / 100 km
Weight	Fuel capacity	13.8 L
Weight	Oil capacity	1.15 L (1.0 L after filter change)
Weight	Coolant capacity	1.0 L (+0.25 L reservoir)
Weight	Curb weight	136 kg

== Second generation: (2014–2018) ==
In 2014, Yamaha gave a facelift to the model, with a slightly tweaked fairing set, an upside-down front fork and a full LCD dashboard. The model launched without ABS, but it became an option for 2015. To comply with EU motorbike safety regulations, ABS on motorcycles was required on all new motorbikes in the EU from 2017. This may cause minor differences in weight, electric or other specifications.

=== Specifications ===
These specifications come from the owner's manual of a 2017 model with ABS.

Dimensions	Overall length	1950 mm
Dimensions	Overall width	695 mm
Dimensions	Overall height	1065 mm
Dimensions	Seat height	825 mm
Dimensions	Wheelbase	1350 mm
Dimensions	Ground clearance	155 mm
Dimensions	Turning radius	3100 mm
Front brake	Disc	Floating, 292 mm
Front brake	Caliper	Fixed, 4 piston, Radial mount
Engine	Type	Liquid cooled, 4-stroke, SOHC
Engine	Displacement	124.7 cc
Engine	Bore x Stroke	52.0 x 58.6 mm
Engine	Compression ratio	11.2 : 1
Engine	Fuel consumption	(Approximately) 3.0 L / 100 km
Weight	Fuel capacity	11.5 L
Weight	Oil capacity	1.15 L (1.0 L after filter change)
Weight	Coolant capacity	1.0 L (+0.25 L reservoir)
Weight	Curb weight	140 kg

== Third generation: (2019–2022) ==
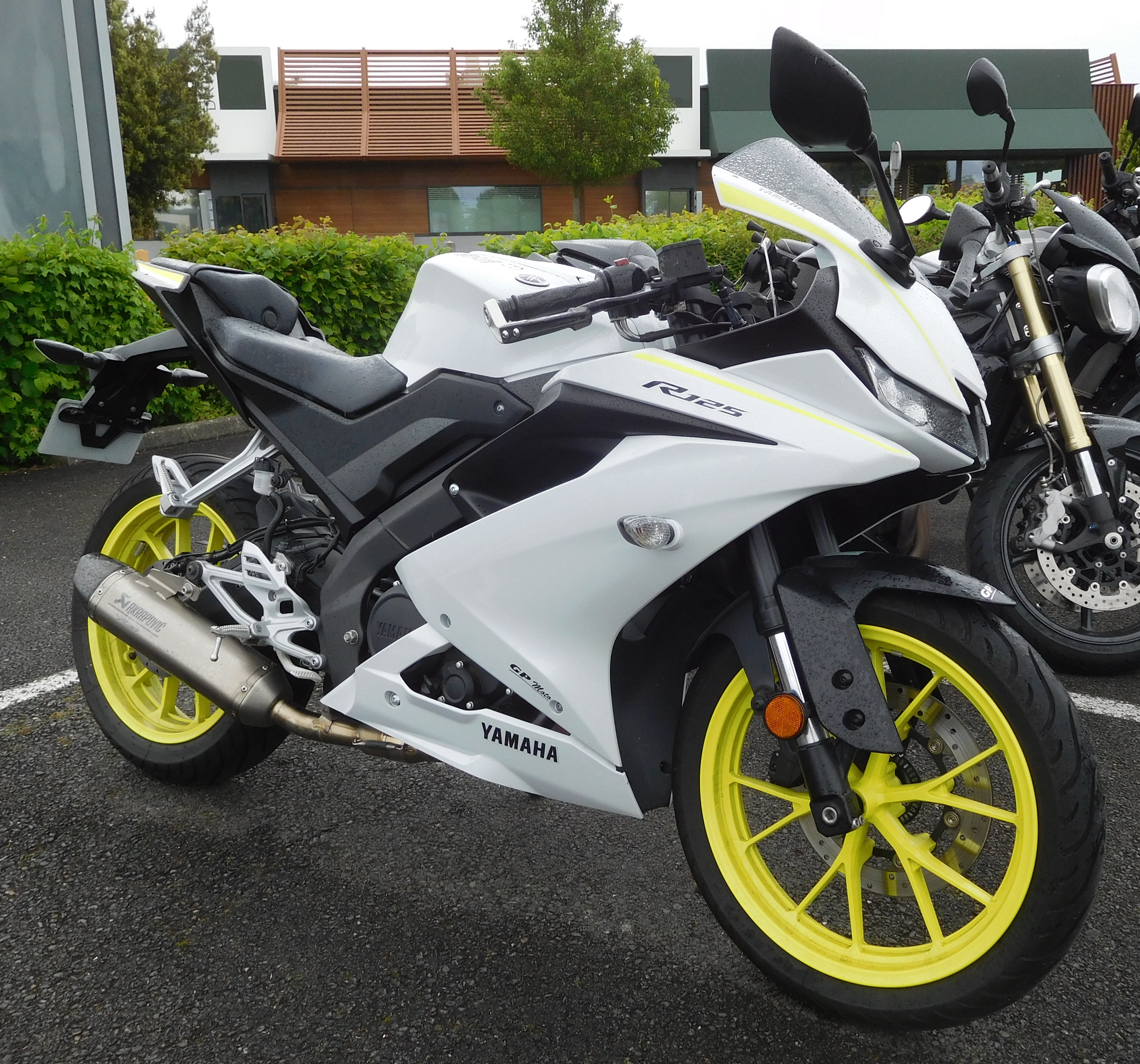

The 2019 model has a new rear swingarm, changes to the frame and bodywork, a new engine with Variable Valve Actuation (VVA).
There is a small 2021 update, that adds a vapor canister to the fuel system, presumably to help the bike comply with the more strict Euro 5 emission standard.

=== Specifications ===
As per the owner's manual of the 2021 model.

Dimensions	Overall length	1990 mm
Dimensions	Overall width	755 mm
Dimensions	Overall height	1140 mm
Dimensions	Seat height	820 mm
Dimensions	Wheelbase	1325 mm
Dimensions	Ground clearance	160 mm
Dimensions	Turning radius	2900 mm
Front brake	Disc	Floating, 292 mm
Front brake	Caliper	Fixed, 4 piston, Radial mount
Engine	Type	Liquid cooled, 4-stroke, SOHC
Engine	Displacement	124.7 cc
Engine	Bore x Stroke	52.0 x 58.6 mm
Engine	Compression ratio	11.2 : 1
Engine	Fuel consumption	(Approximately) 3.0 L / 100 km
Weight	Fuel capacity	11.0 L
Weight	Oil capacity	1.05 L (0.95 L after filter change)
Weight	Coolant capacity	0.49 L (+0.15 L reservoir)
Weight	Curb weight	142 kg

== Fourth generation: (2023–on) ==
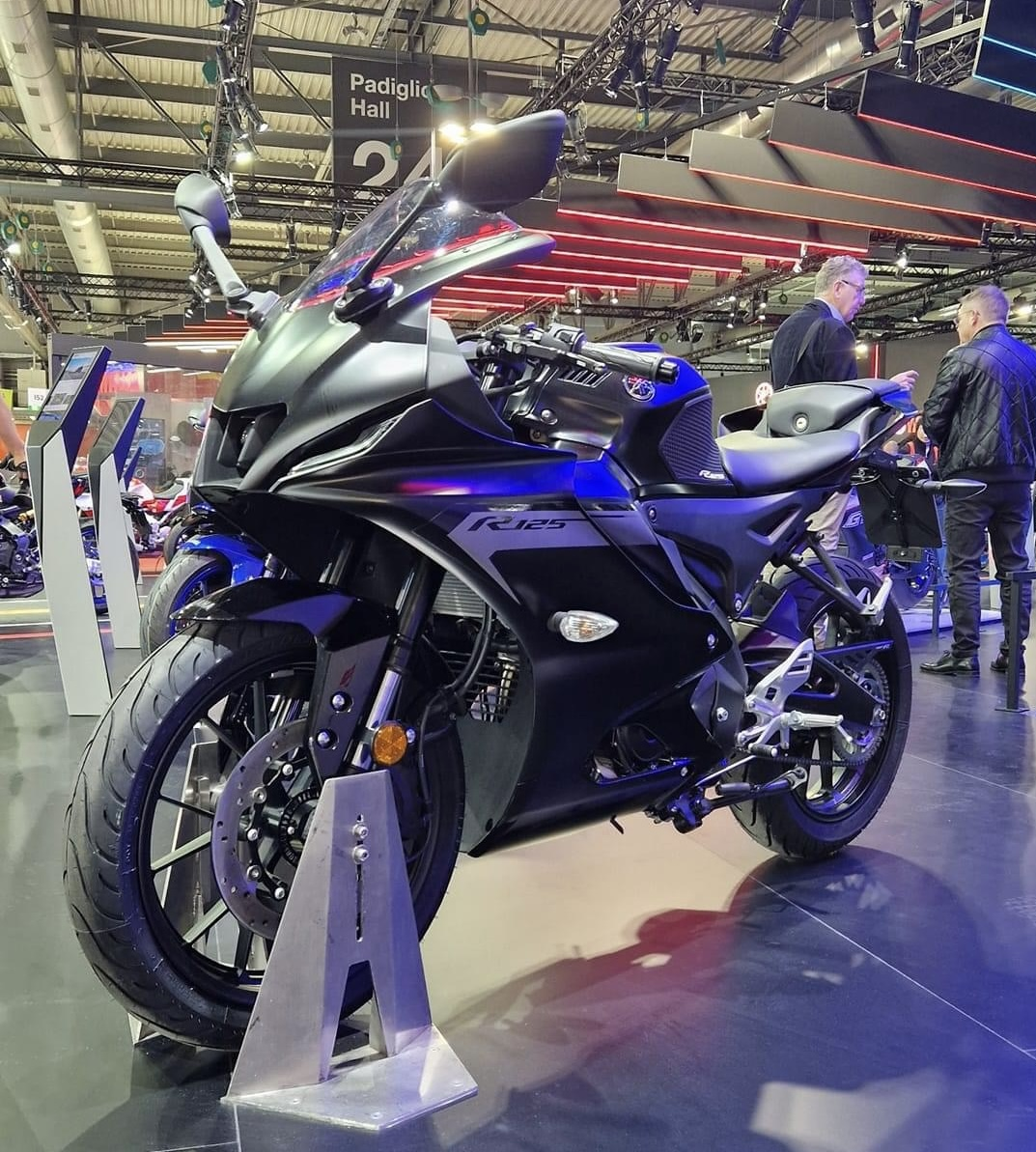

The bike yet again received a slight overhaul for the 2023 model year. The changes include some minor tweaks to the suspension like a different caster angle at the front (it is now 26°), and a shorter swingarm travel at the rear (it is now 110 mm down from 114 mm). The front half of the bike has reworked fairings and a new 5” full color TFT dash with smartphone connectivity.
