= Suzuki Satria =

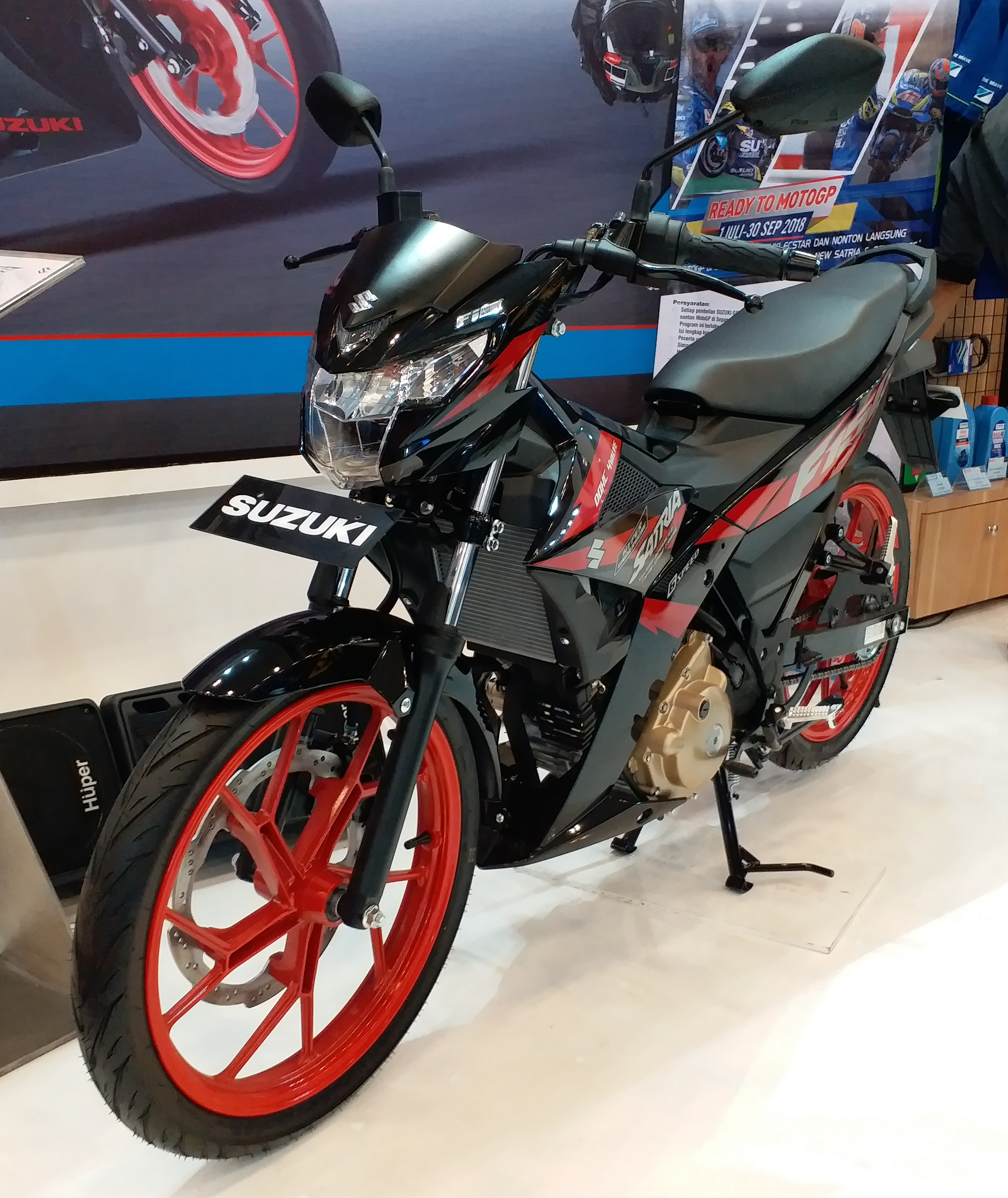
- Manufacturer: Suzuki
- Also called: Suzuki RG Sports (1997–2002); Suzuki RGX120 (2002–2005); Suzuki Raider (2005–present); Suzuki Belang 150 (Malaysia; 2005–2016)
- Production: 1997–present
- Class: Underbone

The Suzuki Satria is an underbone motorcycle manufactured by Suzuki, first released as a 2-stroke bike only in Indonesia in 1997. Many subsequent models have been launched since then. Major change was the release of the 4-stroke Satria F in 2005, and the fuel-injected version in 2016.

The name "Satria" means "knight" in Indonesian.

== History ==
The first type was released in 1997, with the second and third following in 2002 and 2005. The third model is sold as the Belang 150 in Malaysia, and Raider 150 in the Philippines. The fourth model was introduced in 2016, with the engine being fuel-injected, and shared with the GSX-R150, albeit with different gear ratios in the transmission, different injectors and different tuning in the ECM. The fifth model was introduced in November 2025.

== Specifications ==
Specification	1997–2005	2005–2016	2016–2025	2025–Present
Engine & transmission
Layout	2-stroke single-cylinder	4-stroke 4-valve DOHC single-cylinder		
Capacity	120.7 cc (7.37 cu in)	147.3 cc (8.99 cu in)		
Bore × stroke	56.0 mm × 49.0 mm (2.20 in × 1.93 in)	62.0 mm × 48.8 mm (2.44 in × 1.92 in)		
Compression ratio	7.0:1	10.2:1	11.5:1	
Cooling system	Air-cooled	Oil-cooled	Liquid-cooled	
Carburation	Carburettor		Fuel injection	
Starter	Kick	Electric and kick		Electric
Max. power	13 PS (9.6 kW; 12.8 hp) @ 7,500 rpm	16.5 PS (12.1 kW; 16.3 hp) @ 9,500 rpm	18.5 PS (13.6 kW; 18.2 hp) @ 10,000 rpm	
Max. torque	12.74 N⋅m (9.40 lbf⋅ft) @ 6,500 rpm	12.45 N⋅m (9.18 lbf⋅ft) @ 8,500 rpm	13.8 N⋅m (10.2 lbf⋅ft) @ 8,500 rpm	
Transmission	5-speed constant-mesh (1997–2002); 6-speed constant-mesh (2002–2005)	6-speed constant-mesh		
Final drive	Chain			
Cycle parts & suspension
Frame	Steel twin-spar diamond			
Front suspension	Conventional telescopic fork			
Front tyre	70/90–17			
Front brakes	Single disc brake with 2-piston caliper			Single disc brake with 2-piston caliper (ABS for Pro Version)
Rear suspension	Steel swingarm with monoshock			
Rear tyre	80/90–17			
Rear brakes	Drum (1997–2002); Single disc brake with 1-piston caliper (2002–2005)	Single disc brake with 1-piston caliper		
Dimensions
Length	1,960 mm (77.2 in)	1,940 mm (76.4 in)	1,960 mm (77.2 in)	1,995 mm (78.5 in)
Width	710 mm (28.0 in)	652 mm (25.7 in)	675 mm (26.6 in)	
Height	1,040 mm (40.9 in)	941 mm (37.0 in)	980 mm (38.6 in)	
Wheelbase	1,244 mm (49.0 in)	1,280 mm (50.4 in)		
Weight	102.5 kg (226 lb)	95 kg (209 lb)	109 kg (240 lb)	112 kg (246.9 lb) Pro: 115 kg (253.5 lbs)
Fuel capacity	5.2 L (1.1 imp gal; 1.4 US gal)	4.9 L (1.1 imp gal; 1.3 US gal)	4.0 L (0.88 imp gal; 1.1 US gal)	
