= Vapor recovery =

Process of collecting vapor from fuels

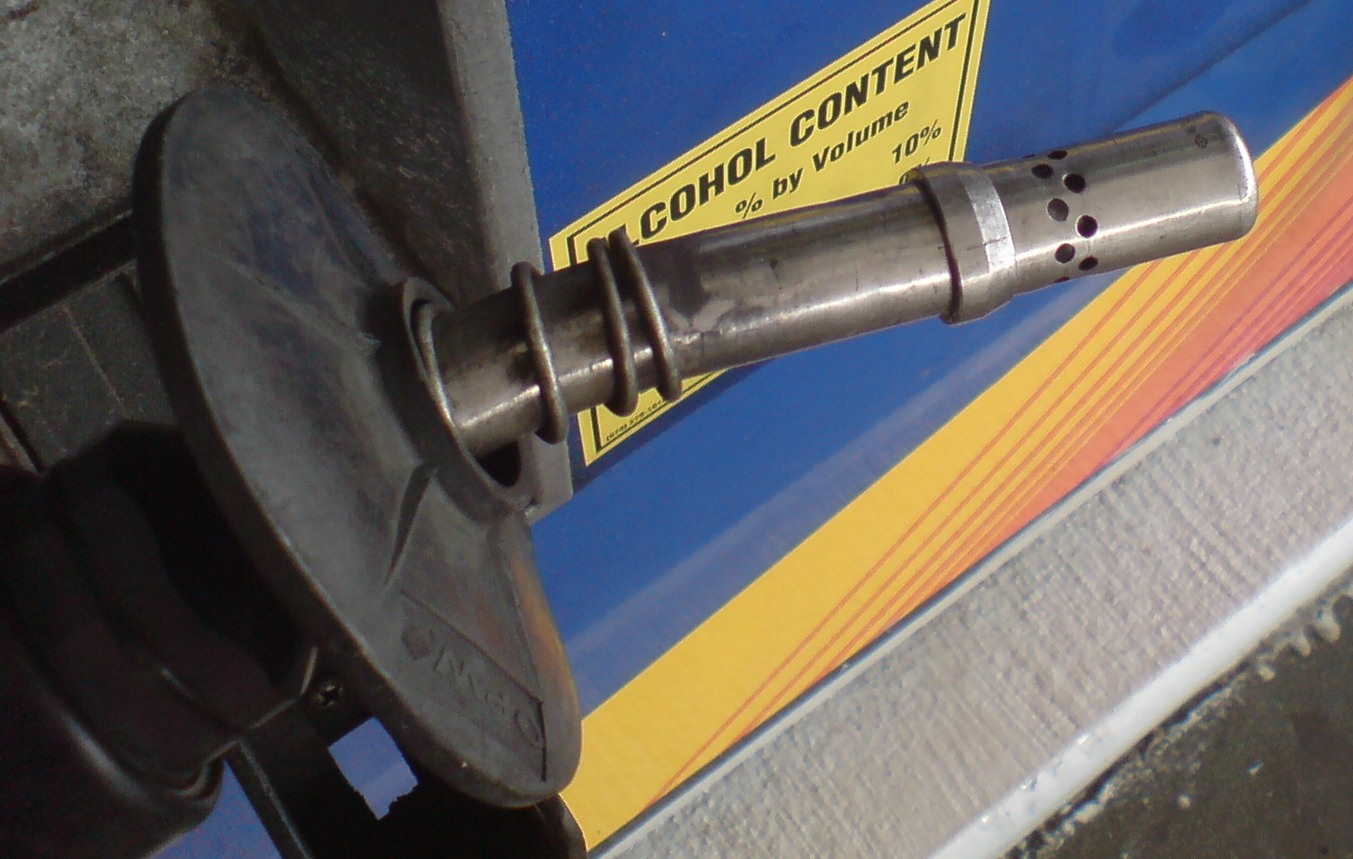
Gas nozzle with vapor recovery

Vapor (or vapour) recovery is the process of collecting the vapors of gasoline and other fuels, so that they do not escape into the atmosphere. This is often done (and sometimes required by law) at filling stations, to reduce noxious and potentially explosive fumes and pollution.

The negative pressure created by a vacuum pump typically located in the fuel dispenser, combined with the pressure in the car's fuel tank caused by the inflow, is usually used to pull in the vapors. They are drawn in through holes in the side of the nozzle and travel along a return path through another hose.

In Australia, vapor recovery has become mandatory in major urban areas. There are two categories - VR1 and VR2. VR1 must be installed at fuel stations that pump less than 500,000 litres annually, VR2 must be installed for larger amounts, or as designated by various EPA bodies.

== Other industries ==
Vapor recovery is also used in the chemical process industry to remove and recover vapors from storage tanks. The vapors are usually either environmentally hazardous, or valuable. The process consists of a closed venting system from the storage tank ullage space to a vapor recovery unit which will recover the vapors for return to the process or destroy them, usually by oxidation.

Vapor recovery towers are also used in the oil and gas industry to provide flash gas recovery at near atmospheric pressure without the chance of oxygen ingress at the top of the storage tanks. The ability to create the vapor flash inside the tower often reduces storage tank emissions to less than six tons per year, exempting the tank battery from Quad O reporting requirements.

The identifiable benefits from an organizational stand point behind vapor recovery is that it helps to make the industry more sustainable and creates a pipeline for pumping exhausts back into production.

== See also ==
- Automobile emissions control
- Onboard refueling vapor recovery
