= Suzuki GSX-R series =

Sports motorcycle models

Suzuki GSX-R
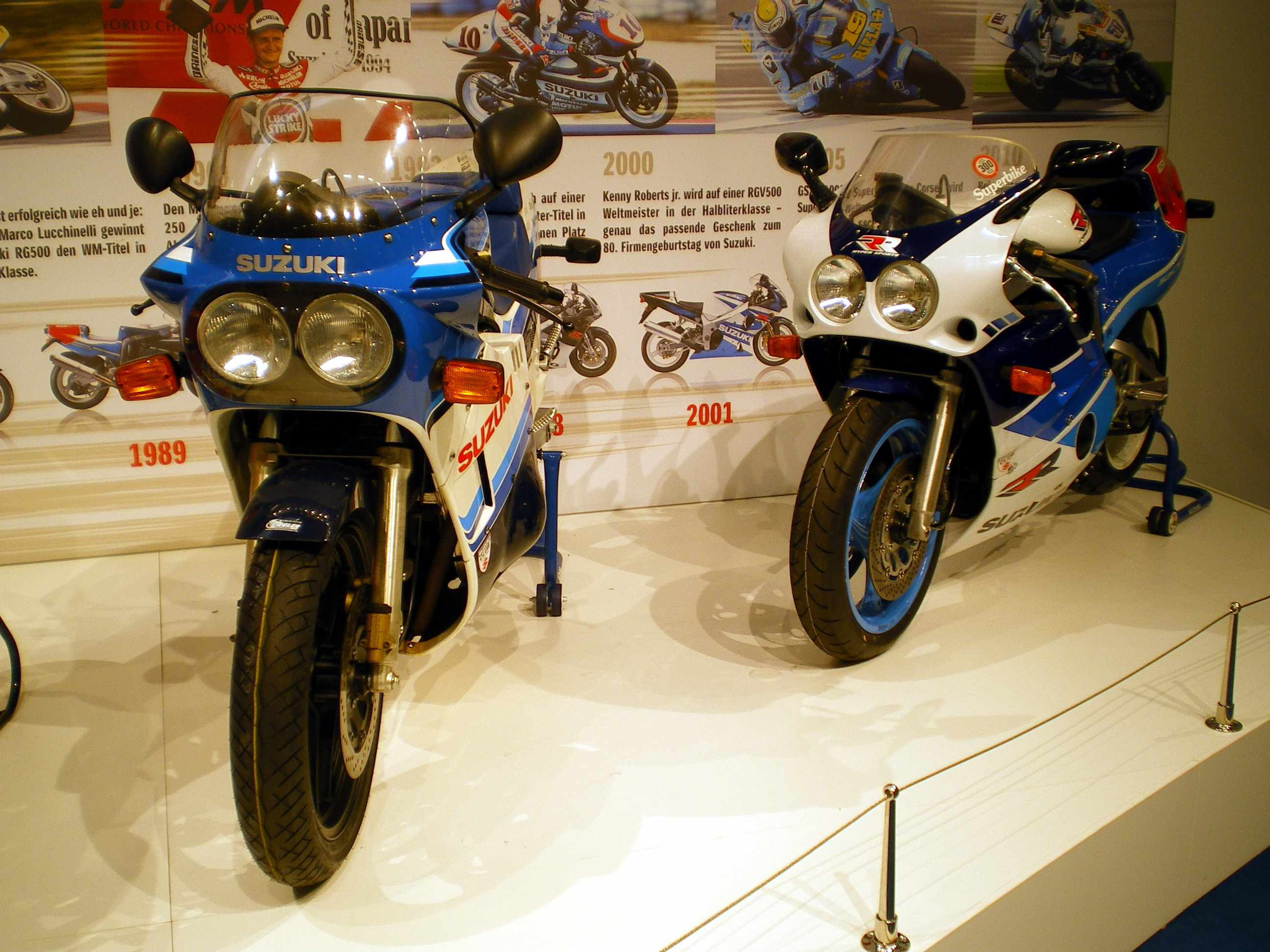
- 1985 Suzuki GSX-R750 and 1989 GSX-R750R
- Manufacturer: Suzuki
- Production: 1984–present
- Class: Sport bike

Suzuki GSX-R is a series of sports motorcycles made by Japanese automotive manufacturer Suzuki since 1984.

== First generation: 1984 ==
In 1984, Suzuki released the first GSX-R (GSX-R400, internal model number GK71b), on sale only in Japan, taking advantage of licensing laws there which were prohibitive of bikes over 400cc. Then in 1985 a 750cc GSX-R was introduced and followed by an 1100cc version in 1986. If the 750cc bike was a fast and capable race-bike for the street, the 1100 was an exercise in raw power and excess. A bit heavier than the 750, at a claimed 435 lbs for the 750 and about 480 lbs for the 1100, but with considerably more power (130 hp stock) and torque. Previous to both of these models.

The first GSX-R of 1984 was a breakthrough model and the closest that any Japanese manufacturer had yet come to building a "race bike with lights". Throughout the 1970s the big four Japanese manufacturers had built bikes with a similar architecture: steel double loop frames, air-cooled transverse fours with either SOHC or DOHC configurations.

At the start of the 1970s two-valve-per-cylinder heads were ubiquitous, by the end of the decade four valve heads were available on the high end bikes. The similarity of the designs across brands and years led to the coining of the term "UJM" for Universal Japanese Motorcycle, which began with Honda's CB-750 of 1969.

These bikes were available in a variety of sizes from 350cc to 1200cc from all four of the Japanese manufacturers, and beginning in 1976 served as the basis for production-based race bikes in the American Motorcycle Association (AMA) Superbike Series. As a result of the experience on the race track it became obvious that the big UJMs were not ideal for racing. Weight was high, frames lacked stiffness and flexed in disturbing ways, power from the big motors overwhelmed the tire technology of the day.

Beginning around 1980 all four manufacturers began to modify the UJM formula in different ways to achieve performance advantages on the track and product differentiation in the market. In 1982 Honda introduced the VF series, which used a V4 rather than transverse-four motor configuration. The first model year only cruiser style bikes were offered, but in 1983 the first sport bike based on the V4 became available:the Honda VFR-750 Interceptor. AMA rules for Superbike racing were changed in 1983 to decrease maximum engine size from 1025cc to 750cc. The Honda Interceptor was ready to compete in this new category. In addition to the innovative V4 engine configuration, it was liquid cooled, and it sported a rectangular tube steel frame, to increase stiffness, as opposed to the more traditional round tubes of the UJM era. The Interceptor was a breakthrough for Honda, and it won many races, including Daytona, and was the second-place finisher in the series. A year later, in 1984 the entire front row at Daytona were Interceptors and Freddie Spencer repeated his win on the V4 Honda.

In 1985, both Yamaha and Suzuki answered the challenge with their own innovations. Yamaha offered the FZ750 which was the first in a series of bikes with 5 valves per cylinder. While it was still a transverse 4, the cylinders were set at a 45 degree angle, unlike the more typical nearly vertical placement common to UJMs. The frame was rectangular section steel like the Honda.

It was into this competitive environment that Suzuki dropped the first 750cc GSX-R model ready to race in the new size mandated by AMA Superbike rules. The GSX-R had the most conventional engine of the three: a four valve per cylinder, inline four - it was a clear descendant of the previous GS series of motors. Cooling was provided by what Suzuki described as an air-oil mix. Oil temps were kept low by a large oil cooler, and engine internals were designed to push the oil at pressure as a spray where it was most needed, notably the underside of the pistons. The principal designer for the bike was Hiroshi Fujiwara, a Suzuki engineer.

The frame was the most innovative aspect of the bike. Suzuki abandoned steel altogether and built the frame from welded square section aluminium tubing. To gain the rigidity they wanted, the tubes were quite large, giving the bike a unique appearance. Whereas the Honda and Yamaha were fast street bikes that could be easily raced, the Suzuki was clearly a race bike that could be ridden on the street. The seating position was the racer's crouch, not the street rider's semi-upright one. It shipped stock with the motor tuned to deliver 100HP, but could be easily boosted to 135 with the race tuning kit. It was the lightest of the superbikes by a good margin, weighing only 388 lb (176 kg). Styling too was aggressive and unique, with a signature full fairing holding two round headlights, starting a trend that continues on supersport motorcycles to this day.

Despite the excellence of the bike it was not able to immediately dethrone the Honda team, who won the AMA Superbike series with the VFR Interceptor from 1984 to 1988. In 1989 Suzuki did accomplish this goal. By then the Suzuki had already become the favorite of privateers, racers not backed by a factory. Its relative simplicity (compared to the V4), cost and reliability made it the obvious choice for individuals competing on their own dime. Over time it has also established an excellent record in endurance racing winning the Bol'd'Or 12 times between 1993 and 2011.

== Second generation: 1988 ==
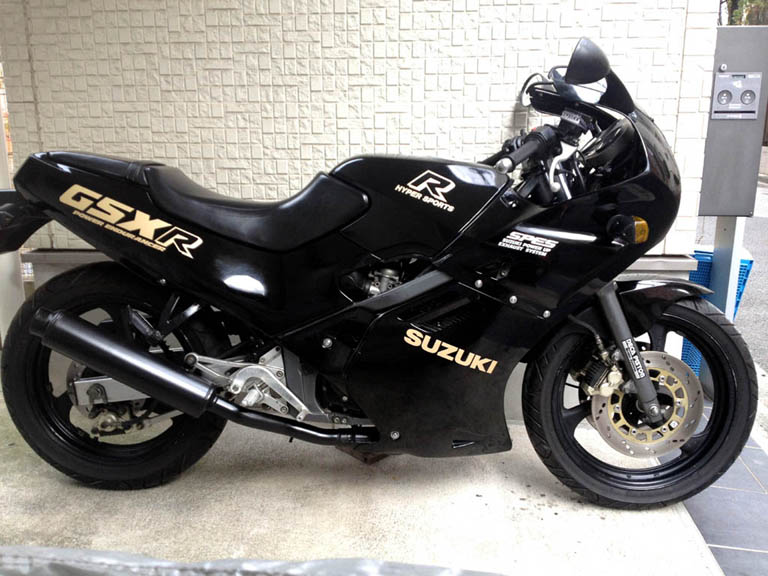
1988 Suzuki GSX-R250

The second generation of GSX-Rs, by then available in 250cc sizes too (primarily for Japan), was released in 1988, again initially on the flagship 750cc, the 1100cc version as well as the smaller siblings following a year later. The new generation GSX-R kept the same basic layout of the previous generation, but the frame was now made of large cast and formed parts, as opposed to the welded from basic rectangular tubes as in the previous generation. New "slingshot" carbs were another new feature, one that gave the model its nickname and were announced on the body with decals proclaiming this innovation.

Between major revisions all models received updates annually, sometimes quite significant, and the model name was incremented with the next letter in the alphabet beginning with F for the 1985 model. The generations are marked by major changes in the frame and/or engine.

The second generation grew in power (and weight) as suspension components were continually upgraded to deal with the increased power and traction of the improving tires of the era. By 1991 the 750cc machine was up to 458 lbs. 1991 was the first year where the dual round headlights were replaced with a more aerodynamic shape.

== Third generation: 1992 ==
In 1992 the GSX-R 750 was given the model designation GSX-R 750WN - the "W" signifying the first water-cooled engine. The innovative air-oil design of 1985 was simply no longer able to provide enough cooling for the power the engine was putting out, now a claimed 118 hp. The weight of the previous year, 458 lb (208 kg), was maintained while adding the water cooling. Also to be noted this was the last year of the "Power Jet" which came stock on the carburetors since 1989. These were noticeable by the short fuel line to the left of the carburetor, running the length from the fuel bowl to the top of the bell housing. Basic function of the power jet was the smooth out fuel delivery from 9.5k- 10k rpm all the way to the rev limiter. However, these jets were blanked out on the US models but were fully functional for Canadian buyers and other countries. The water cooled bikes would not be available to the US until 1993.

== Fourth generation: 1994 ==
A comprehensive redesign, still using the same basic frame and engine architecture, resulted in a bike 22 lb (10 kg) lighter, down to 436 lb (198 kg). The following year would be the last for the double downtube / angled top tube frame design that had originated on the 1985 GSX-R.

== Fifth generation: 1996 ==
The old frame design, a unique signature of the GSX-R was dated. By 1996 all of the manufacturers were using aluminum frames, and most of them were stiffer and lighter than the Suzuki frame, and featured large beams running in a straight line from the steerer tube to the swingarm pivot. The 1996 followed this principle, and along with the new frame a completely revised engine was used. As a result of this comprehensive redesign the GSX-R began its return to the front of the production racer pack, finally beginning to achieve the AMA Superbike domination it had been designed for a decade previously. The new architecture allowed the GSX-R to win an impressive 10 of 11 consecutive AMA Superbike championships beginning in 1999.

The 1996 GSX-R was a return to the original formula, with an emphasis on light weight, not just power. Weight was back down to an impressive 394 lb (179 kg).

Even though later models also used the Suzuki Ram Air Direct system, GSX-R's from 1996 to 1999 became known as the SRAD models.

An update in 1998 saw fuel injection added, increasing power to 135 hp, but other than that the GSX-R750 SRAD remained largely unaltered until its replacement arrived in 2000.

== Sixth generation: 2000 ==
The year 2000 again saw a total redesign of the engine, now with dual throttle valve electronic fuel injection. A new frame was also introduced in this model that was lighter, and had a longer swingarm than the previous model. Performance was improved, and the 2000 model became one of the most appreciated of all GSX-Rs. More than a decade later, in 2011, Cycle World magazine would describe it as "one of the greatest sportbikes of all time". Suzuki marketed the bike as "the most advanced GSX-R ever".

== GSX-R1000: 2001 ==
After a several year break a new big-bore GSX-R was offered. In place of the unique 1100cc displacement of the old model a more standard displacement of 1000cc was produced. (This aligned better with some racing series.)

The new 1000 was built with the "modern style" architecture and it resulted in an even larger weight loss for the litre-bike: from 487 lb to 374 lb.

== GSX-R1000R: 2017 ==
Suzuki has released an up spec model GSX-R1000R; this R model comes with a Motion Track Brake System, Bi-directional quick shifter and launch control. Also on the R model, as reported by Sport Rider, are the same Showa Balance Free Front (BFF) fork and Balance Free Rear Cushion (BFRC Lite) shock that come standard on the 2016 Kawasaki ZX-10R.

== GSX-R125 and GSX-R150: 2017 ==
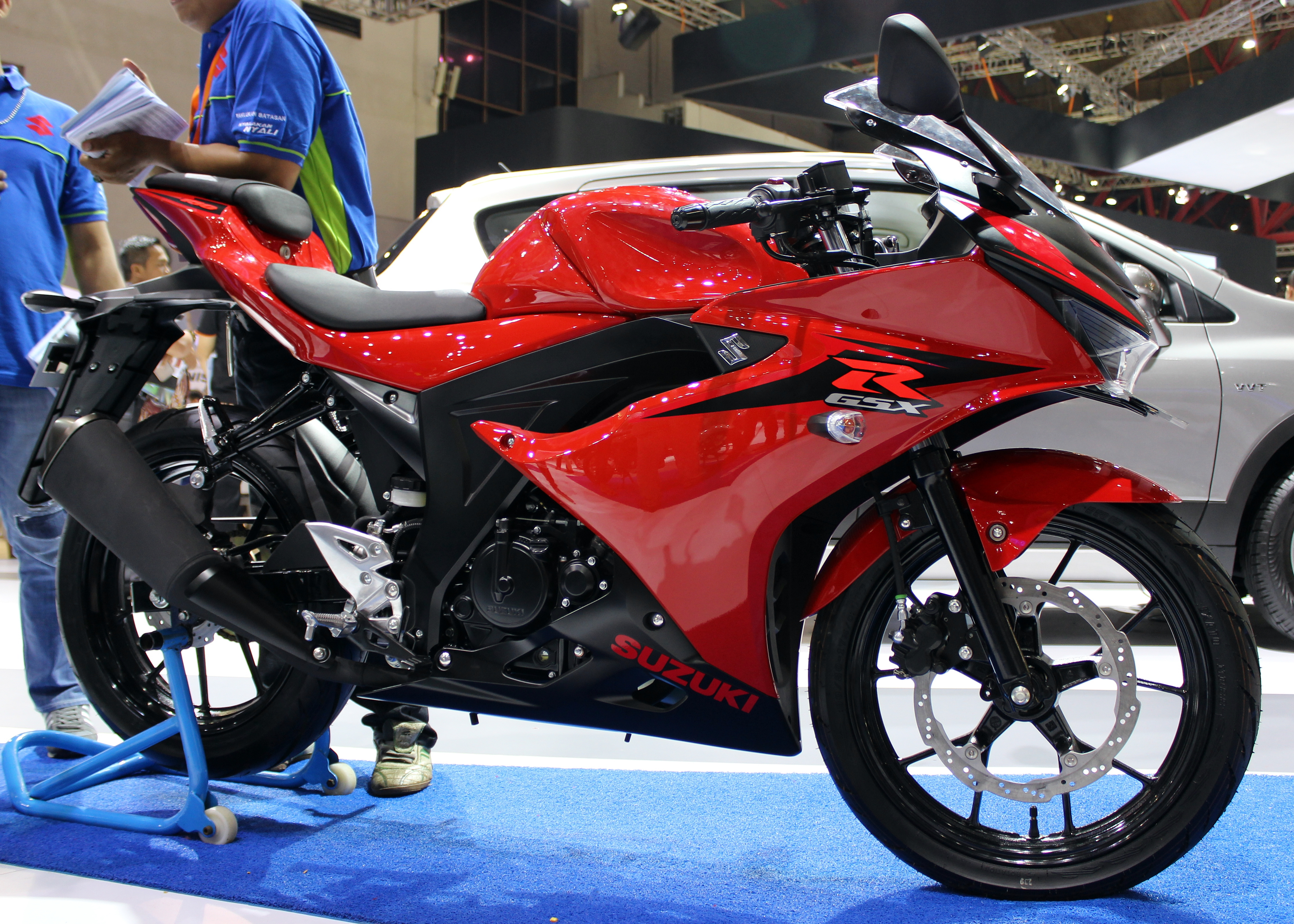
2017 Suzuki GSX-R150

The first single-cylinder GSX-R motorcycle, the 125 cc (7.6 cu in) GSX-R125 was introduced at the 2016 Intermot. The stroked-up 147.3 cc (8.99 cu in) GSX-R150 was officially unveiled in Indonesia at the 2016 Indonesia Motorcycle Show. The engine construction, which is fuel-injected, is the same as the 2016–present Satria F/Raider underbone sold in Southeast Asia, albeit with few differences, such as gear ratio tuning, injector hole tuning (8 in Satria F, 10 in GSX-R125/150), and ECU tuning.

== Discontinued models ==
- GSX-R50: 1987
- GSX-R250: 1987–1992
- GSX-R400: 1984–1996
- GSX-R1100: 1986–1998

== Current models ==
- GSX-R125: 2017–present
- GSX-R150: 2017–present
- GSX-R600: 1992–present
- GSX-R750: 1985–present
- GSX-R1000: 2001–present
  - GSX-R1000R: 2017–present

== Non-production prototypes ==
- GSX-R/4, a prototype race car using the engine in the Suzuki Hayabusa
- GSX-RR, 1000 cc MotoGP prototype : 2015–2021

== See also ==
- Suzuki Gixxer
