= Onboard refueling vapor recovery =

Environmental system for vehicles

An onboard refueling vapor recovery system (ORVR) is a vehicle fuel-vapor emission control system. It captures potentially harmful volatile organic compounds (VOCs) during refueling. Without such a system, fuel vapors trapped inside gas tanks would be released into the atmosphere, each time the vehicle was refueled.

There are two types of vehicle fuel vapor emission control systems: the ORVR, and the older, less efficient "Stage II" vapor recovery system. An ORVR system has the added benefit of being able to retain those emissions, by delivering them to the vehicle's activated carbon-filled canister. It later then disposes of the vapors by adding them to the engine's inlet manifold during normal operation—and thus to the fuel/air mixture supplying the engine.

The goal behind implementing the ORVR system throughout the U.S. and other territories is to eventually make the Stage II systems obsolete.

== History ==
William F. Woodcock, William E. Ruhig Jr., and Loren H. Kline hold the patents for the ORVR system.

According to Freda Fung and Bob Maxwell, the Environmental Protection Agency (EPA) has been controlling emissions among the United States since the 1970s. They implemented regulations which would limit the amount of fuel vapor released into the atmosphere during the refueling of a motor vehicle. Before any EPA mandate was put into action, California devised its own regulations, ahead of every other state, by 16 years, when it required the implementation of the Stage II vapor recovery system. The ORVR systems were required but did not take over instantaneously; instead, EPA decided that Stage II control systems were necessary for all areas of non attainment (an area considered to have air quality worse than the National Ambient Air Quality Standards as defined in the Clean Air Act Amendments of 1970) until the requirement had been dropped by the Clean Air Act of 1990. In the United States, ORVR has been mandated on all passenger cars (phasing in over the 1998-2000 model years) and light trucks up to 10,000 lbs gross vehicle weight rating (phasing in over the 2001-2006 model years) by the EPA.

As the years went by, ORVR systems became so widespread throughout the United States, that Stage II systems were becoming obsolete. On May 9, 2012, EPA Administrators released their final rule making which acknowledged enough ORVR systems were operational to remove further need for Stage II systems. However, it left the option open to those states that felt the use of Stage II was still necessary for their particular area.

== Benefits ==
1. According to EPA, ORVR vehicles function at 98% efficiency, while the efficiency of the Stage II system ranges from 62% to 92%.
2. The ORVR system is significantly less expensive than the Stage II system.
3. The lifespan and durability of the ORVR system is much greater than the Stage II System. That translates into much lower maintenance costs for the ORVR system.
4. The Stage II system cannot collect diurnal emissions, while the ORVR system can.

== Complications between ORVR & Stage II ==
Vehicle ORVR systems have design characteristics that are not compatible with Stage II vacuum assisted systems. When these two systems work in conjunction, the overall efficiency declines significantly, as compared to each system functioning on its own.

=== Problem ===
An ORVR carbon-filled canister (installed on modern vehicles) is designed to capture fuel vapors displaced while refueling, and then to inject them into the intake manifold later on, so that they are burned along with the regular fuel, during normal engine operation. However, a Stage II vapor recovery system, installed on refueling gas station pumps, uses a vacuum to prevent fuel vapors from being released into the atmosphere. The design of the fill pipe seal in ORVR systems prevents fuel vapors from entering the fuel tank fill pipe. That frustrates the purpose of the Stage II nozzle, which was designed to vacuum away any fuel vapors that come up that fill pipe during the refueling process. If the car's own vapor recovery system is working properly, then the Stage II nozzle will only be vacuuming normal fresh air and depositing that into the gas station's underground fuel storage tanks. That ends up causing evaporation of fuel vapors into the atmosphere, because too much pressure builds up in those fuel storage tanks. When that pressure becomes too great, it is released into the atmosphere via a pressure relief pipe.

== General components ==
=== Carbon canister ===
The vapors which are displaced from the fuel tank by the incoming fuel are routed via the vapor vent line to the canister and are absorbed by activated carbon. These canisters are made of either steel or plastic. The size of this canister is tailored to accommodate expected evaporative emissions. The emissions occur throughout the day, even when the vehicle is parked.

=== Fuel tank filler pipe with seal ===
The fuel tank filler pipe has a seal, either mechanical or liquid, to stop vapors from escaping the filler tube. A mechanical seal is usually an annular elastomeric material through which the nozzle must pass during refueling, preventing vapors from escaping alongside the nozzle. A liquid seal is created by the design of the filler pipe, which creates a seal with the liquid flowing into the tank. Since the liquid fills the entire pipe, no vapors can escape during refueling. A liquid seal is usually used for smaller vehicles, while the mechanical seal is used for larger vehicles.

=== Vapor vent line ===
The vent line is a tube that routes vapors from the fuel tank to the vapor storage device.

=== Vapor purge line ===
The vapor purge line directs vapors from the vapor storage device to the engine to be burned, to purge the vapor storage device.

=== Purge valve ===
The purge valve controls the purge vapor purge line, through which the manifold vacuum pulls air through the vapor storage device and purges it of fuel vapors. The electronic control unit (ECU) controls the opening and closing of this valve.

=== Anti-spitback valve ===
The anti-spitback valve prevents spilling of vapors and is located in the fillneck.

=== Fuel tank ===
The fuel tank necessarily contains fuel vapors (occupying all the space which is not occupied by fuel). These are the vapors that must be contained so they do not escape into the atmosphere.

=== Vent/rollover valve ===
The vent/rollover valve provides a method of controlled escape for gasoline vapors during the refueling process. It has a mechanism which closes the vent in the event the vehicle rolls over, to prevent spilling of VOCs or fuel in general. It also acts as a fill limiter.
