= Suzuki PE series =

Series of off-road racing motorcycles

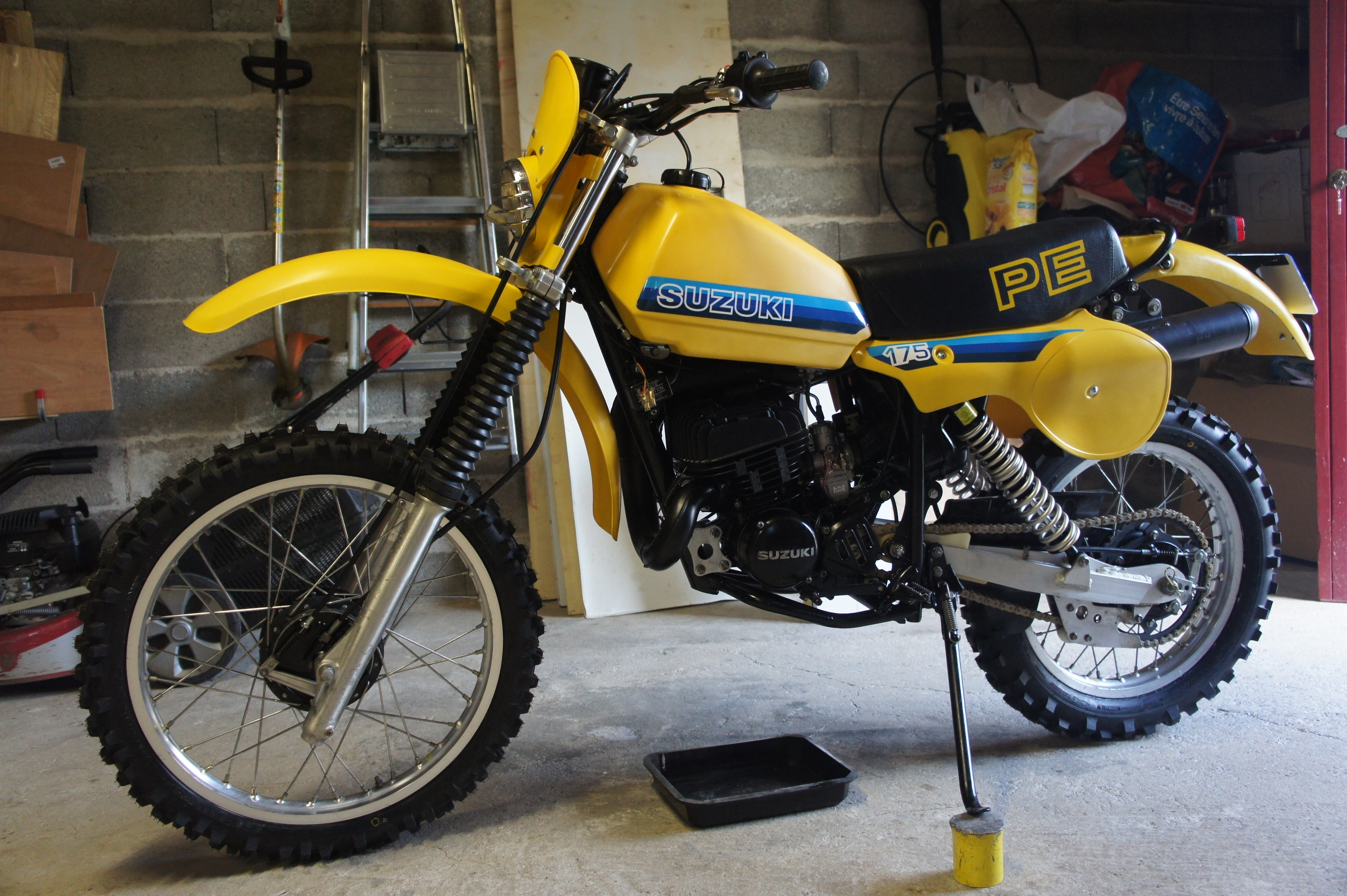
1981 Suzuki PE175X

The Suzuki "Pure Enduro" series of off-road racing motorcycles ran from 1977 through to 1984 in engine displacements from 175cc through 400cc. All engines were case-reed valve, air-cooled, two-stroke and single-cylinder with plain steel bores. Lubrication was provided via 20:1 pre-mix. These were directly related to the Suzuki RM series (Racing Model) range of motocross racers.

== Background ==
During the 1970s, Suzuki had become the first Japanese producer to win a World Motocross Championship, and swept many events via the riding of stars such as Joel Robert, Roger DeCoster, Sylvain Geboers, Gaston Rahier and Gerrit Wolsink on their RH and RN series factory racers.

By 1974 the publicly available TM series (1971–75) of racers failed to reflect the advances of the factory Grand Prix machines in performance and handling. This was recognised and within two years, replaced by the much improved RM Series machines. These became extremely popular. The direct transfer of the works Grand Prix developments into the RM Series combined for major success in the market.

== Creation of the PE ==
In the specialised Enduro field, the USA market was dominated by machines by Penton (KTM), Rokon, Husqvarna, Maico, CZ, Can-Am and others. Suzuki saw this as an area in which they could compete. In 1975, Tosh Koyama and T. Shigenoya at US Suzuki asked John Morgan to provide the factory with information about Enduros and Enduro motorcycles. He then met with a group of Suzuki's factory engineers to discuss in detail. Suzuki were also working with Graham Beamish (their UK importer), and in Autumn of 1975, undertook to take the upcoming 1977 RM250B motocrosser and add the appropriate engine, lighting and suspension changes to allow this motocross racer to run over short stretches of public roads during enduros. This was a keenly priced, well performing machine for the period. The British Trophy team entered 3 of the new PE250B into the Austrian ISDT of September 1976 and carried off 3 gold medals, despite repeated stops to allow the machines to cool.

The initial 1977 PE250B proved rugged, well made and docile. The engine was effectively the 5-speed RM series motocross engine, with altered gearing, porting and a heavier flywheel, which produced only 28HP but had broader power and outstanding torque. This proved highly competitive and popular in all countries.

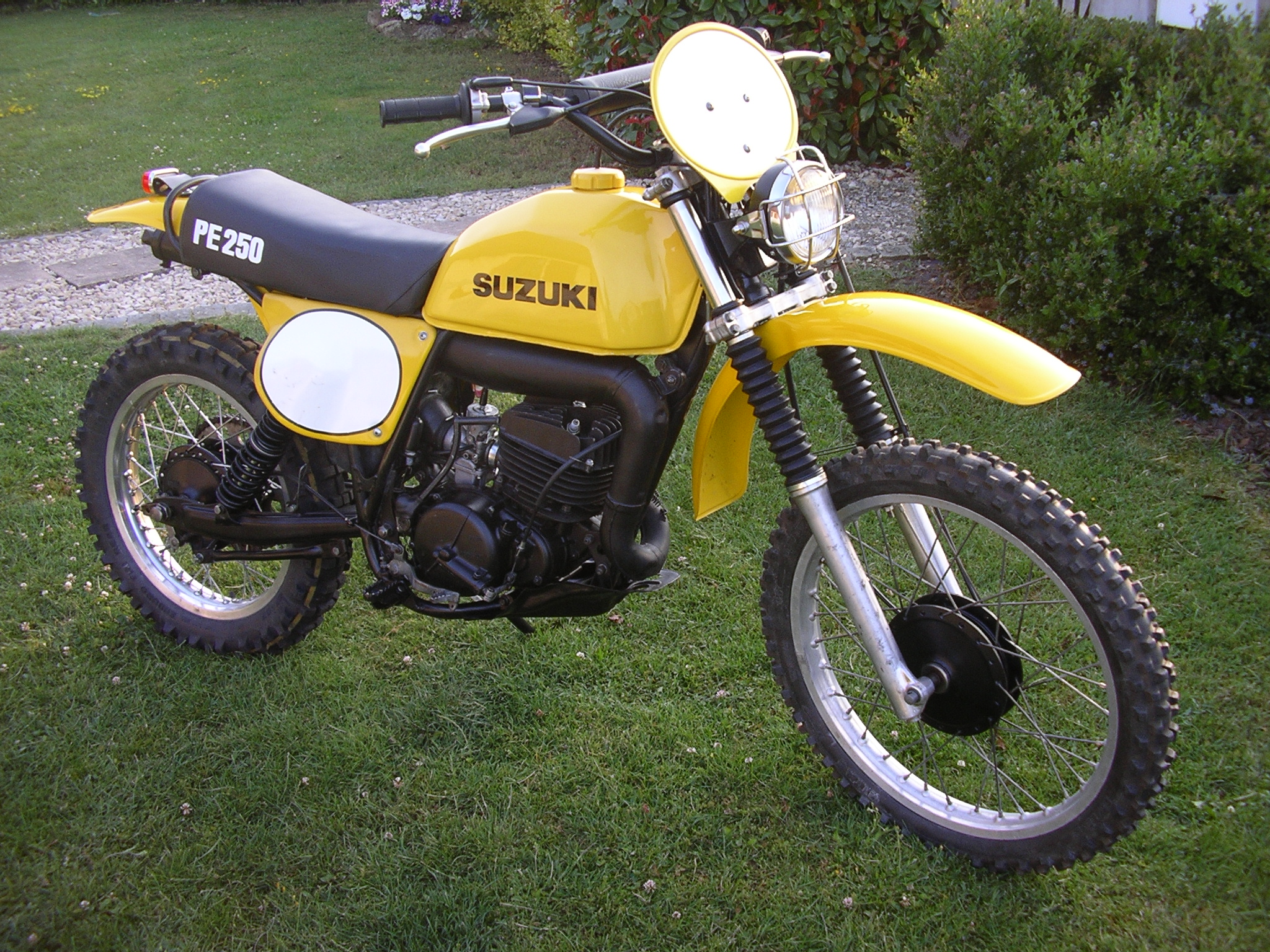
Suzuki PE 250 B le canari

== Models ==
The following year, 1978, the decision was made to widen the model range and the PE175C was released. This was again based upon an RM Series machine (the RM125) with appropriate alterations. The PE250C continued its development and had many small but effective improvements. The PE175C was built upon the RM125A frame and 6-speed RM125C components, along with the "A" softer suspension. Lighting and speedometer were provided courtesy of TS Trail/street machines. All PE's until the PE175Z had 36mm forks common across each model year with damping and spring-rate changes to suit. This new PE175C was keenly priced and proved immensely popular.

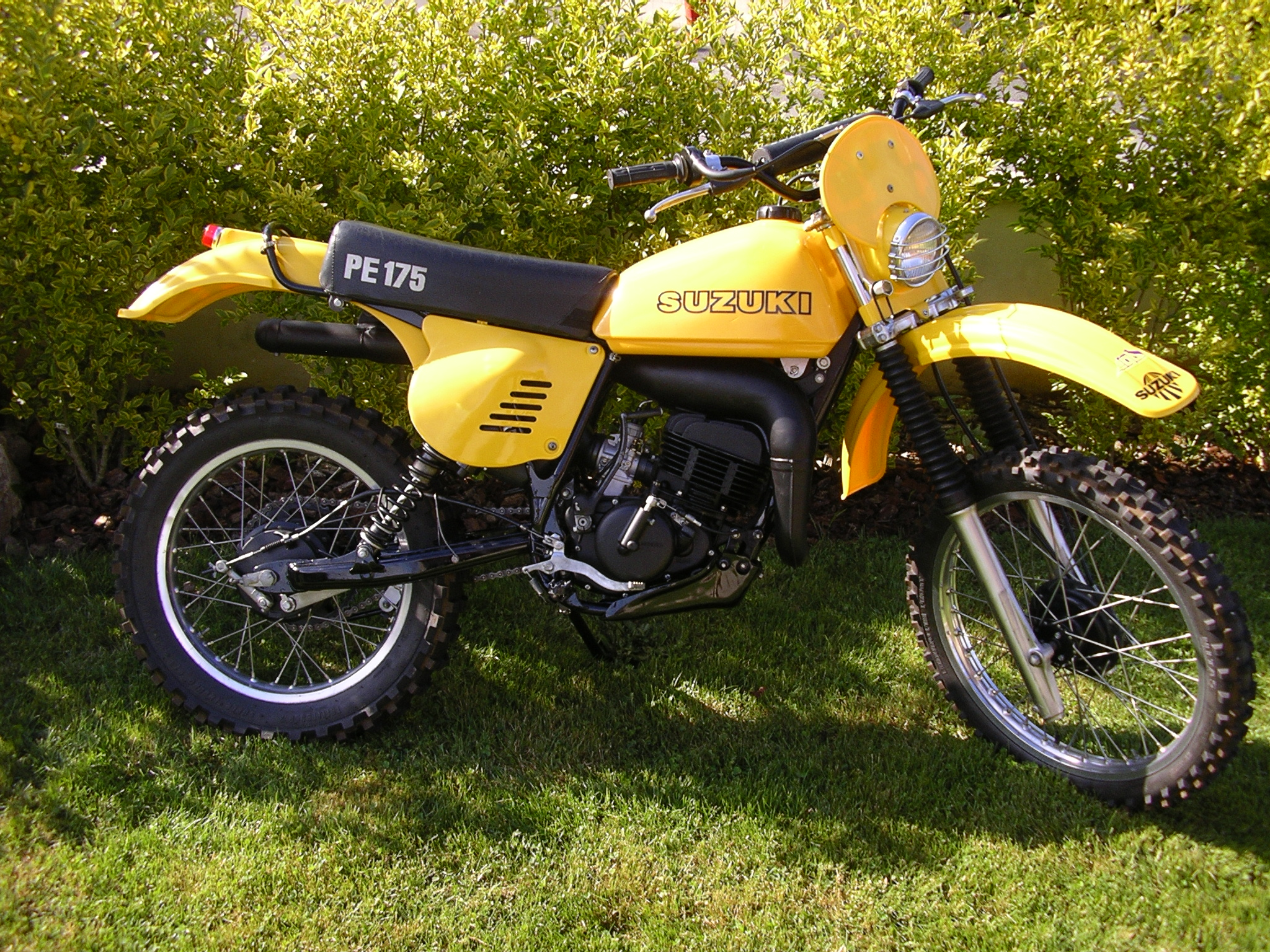
1978 SUZUKI PE 175 C

1979 saw detail/evolution changes but nothing ground-breaking on the machines.

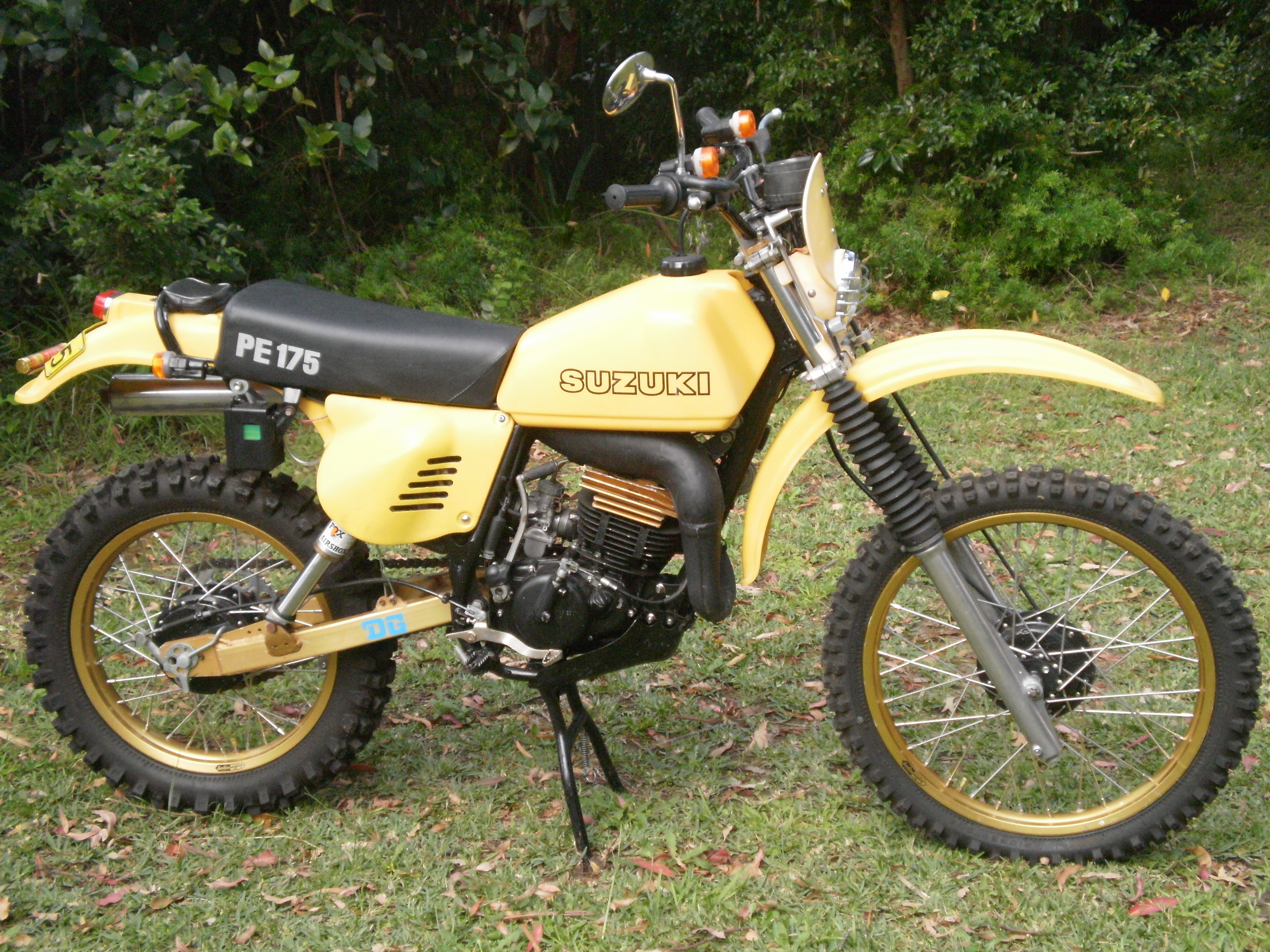
1979 PE175N

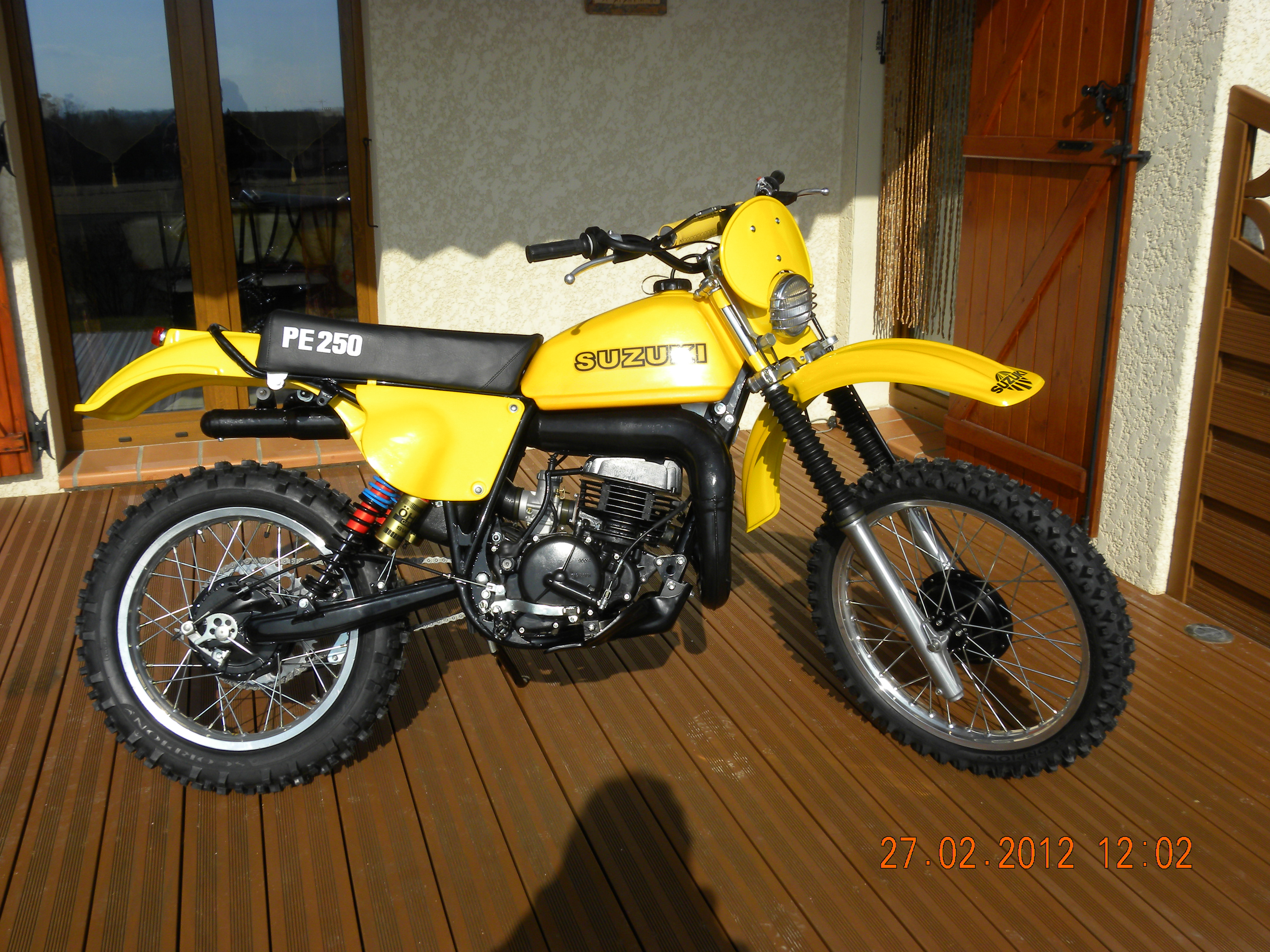
SUZUKI PE 250 N

1980 saw the further widening of the range, with the introduction of the PE400T. This was unusual in that the 397cc (85mm x 70mm) 5-speed engine was specifically designed for the PE Series and did not leverage the contemporary RM400 motocross engine. The 400 engine was deliberately designed as an enlarged RM250 and including primary kick. This was instigated by John Morgan of Team Suzuki in the USA.

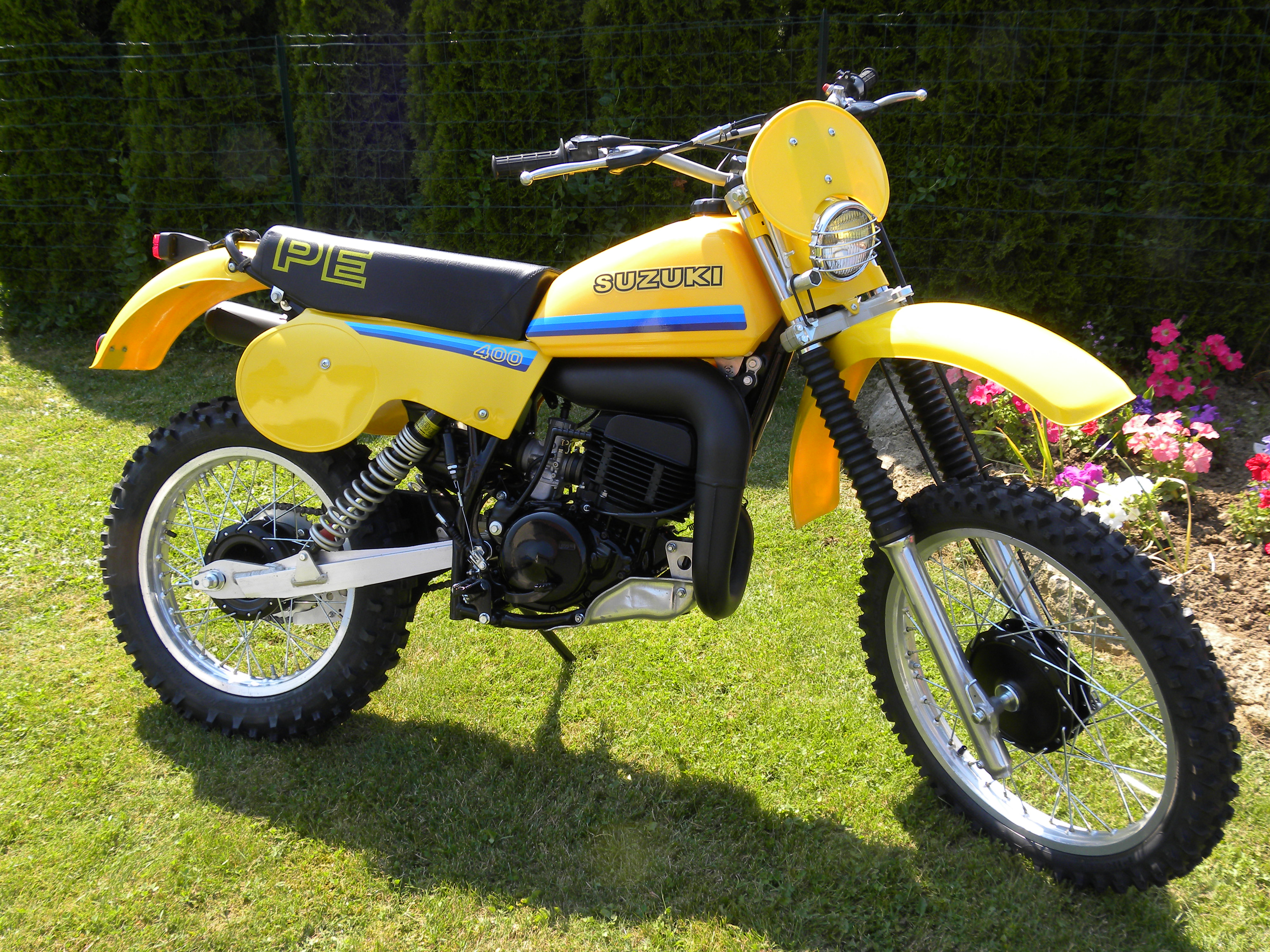
1980 SUZUKI PE 400 T

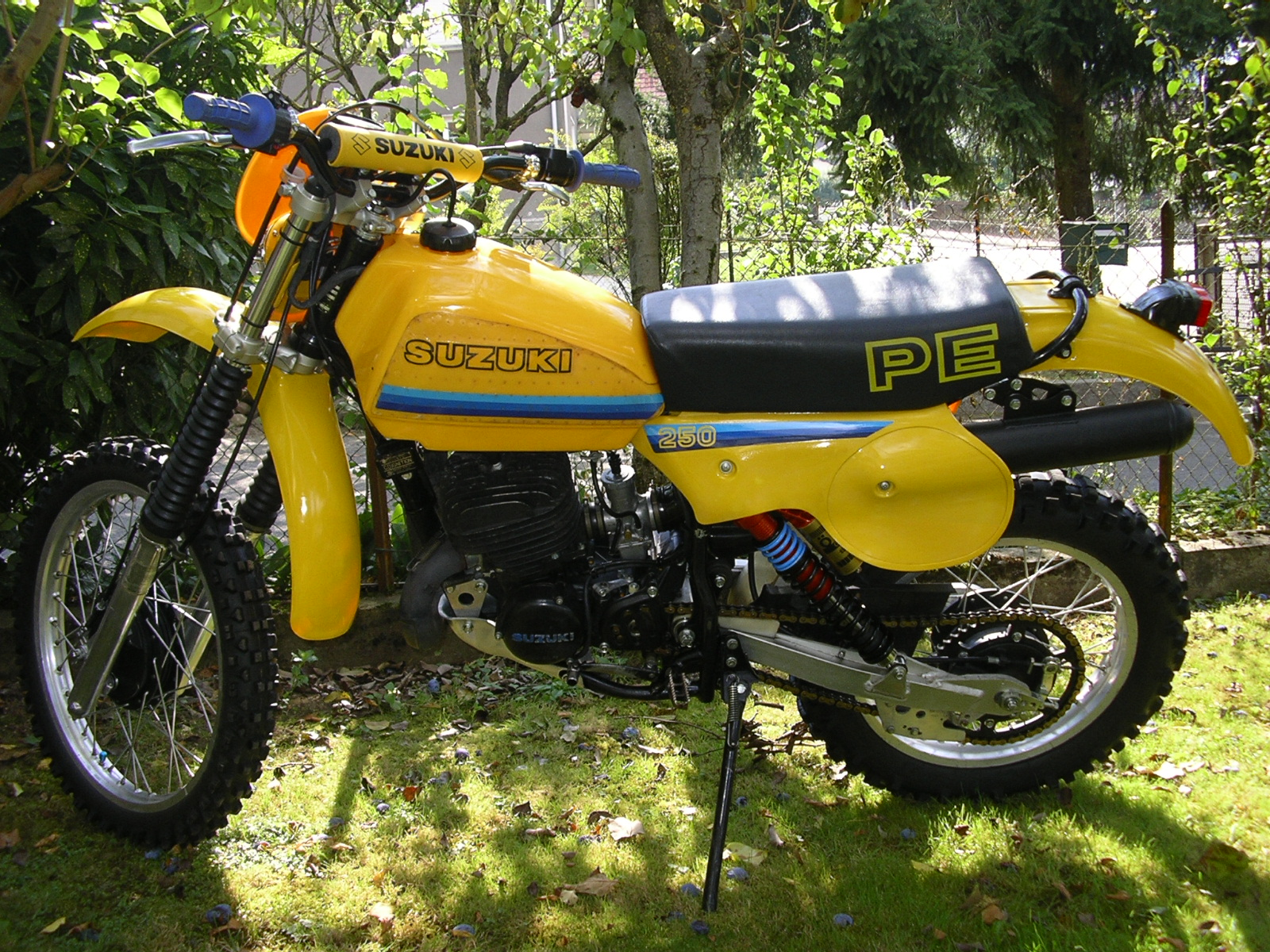
1980 SUZUKI PE 250 T

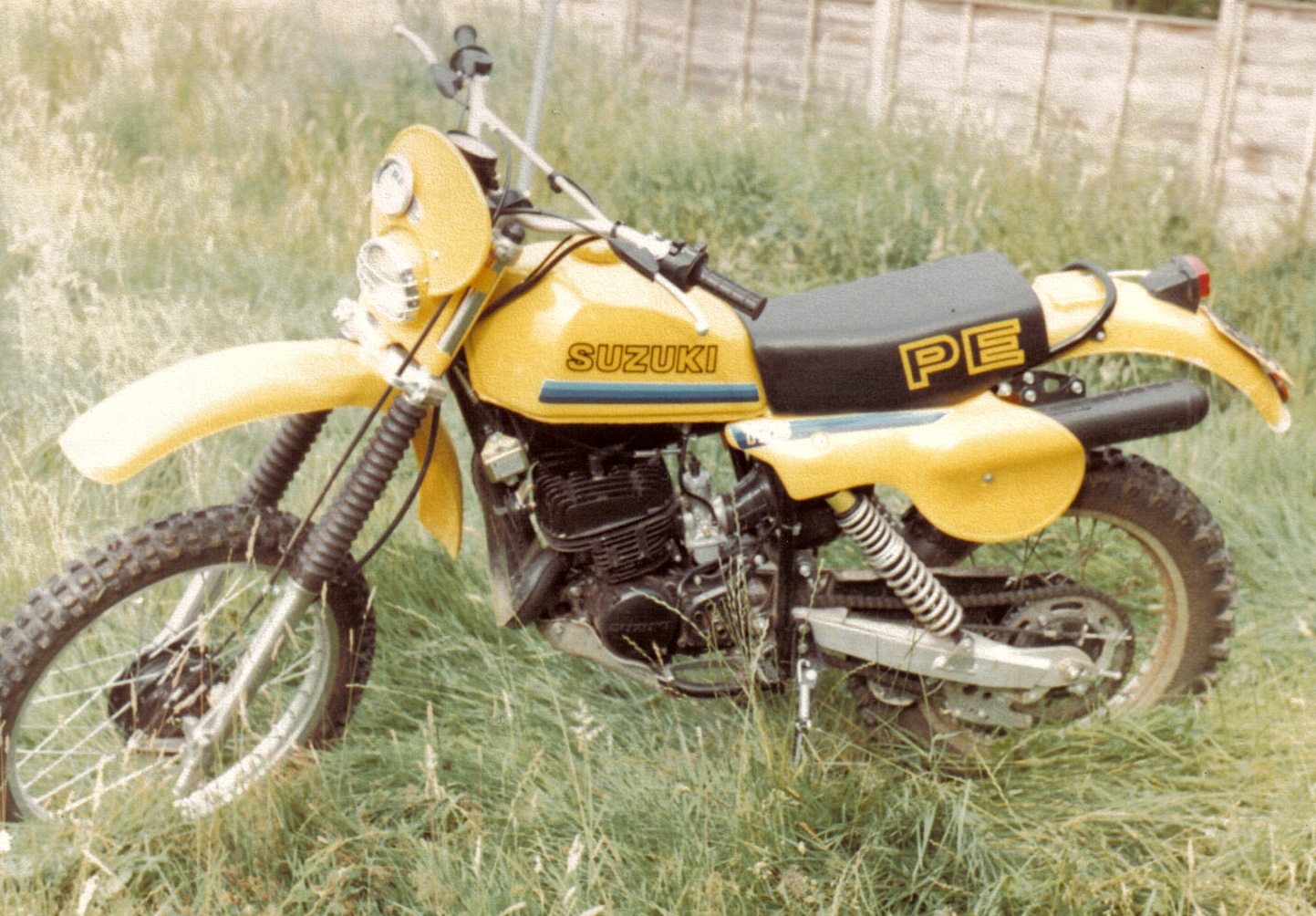
1980 PE175-T

It shares mounting points and some components with the PE250 engine. In addition, 1980 saw the introduction of major advancements and refinements carried over from the RM machines, such as the alloy swing-arm, better suspension, many engine improvements and the addition of a superb quick-change rear wheel. This created a very successful range of machines covering the PE175, PE250 and PE400.

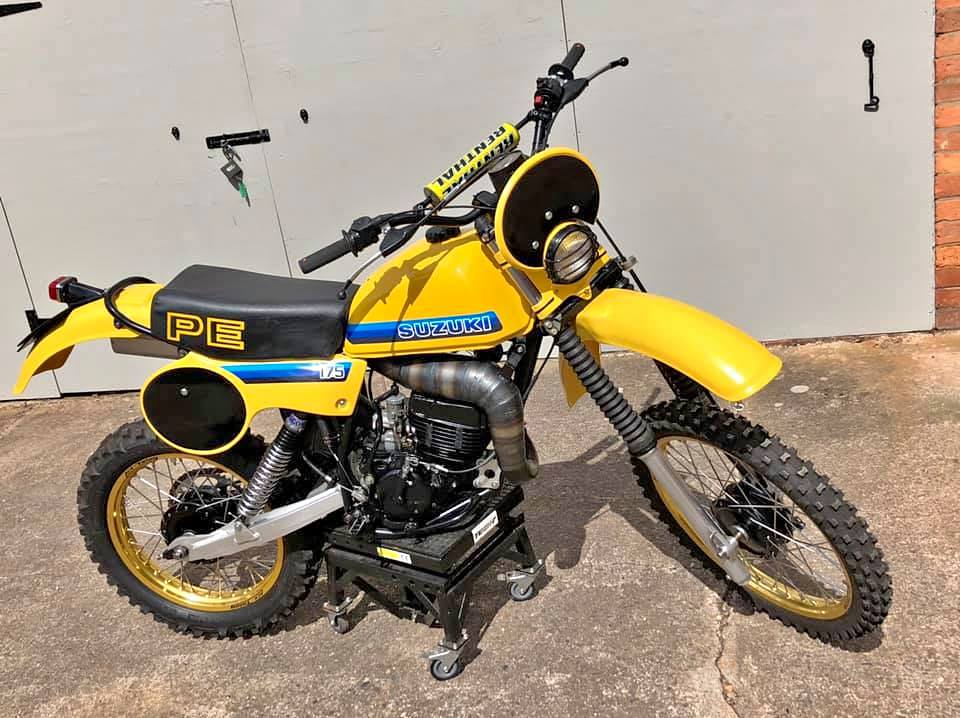
1981 restored PE175-X

1981 saw the 175, 250 and 400 being successful and popular, with limited development. The PE250X had many minor changes, but while changes were still occurring, these were not ground-breaking or major. 1981 was the last full-range year for most countries and with the focus of Suzuki moving to cleaner 4-stroke engines for the majority of their new machines and range. Effectively, 1981 became the peak year.

By 1982, clearly, the PE Series was now seriously lacking on-going development. Suzuki was changing its focus, pulling out of serious enduro competition and the Pure Enduro range was being curtailed. 1982 (model "Z") was the last year where all three models could be purchased and even then the 250 and 400 machines were only available in small numbers, in a small number of countries. (Mainly the UK, Australia, Canada). The larger model Z's (250/400) had a handful of minor changes but could not be described as notable improvements over the previous "X" series machines.

The PE175Z and PE175D however continued to evolve, and took advantage of the new RM125 mono-shock 'Full-Floater' system to produce an outstandingly well-handling enduro machine, albeit with lack of on-going engine development. The PE175D was the "Z" with altered gearing. This meant it was easier for the novice, compared to an "A-Grade" rider, but the PE was now slower and undeveloped in comparison to the 200cc machines becoming available from other manufacturers.

In 1984, the last PE machine was released, the PE175E. This was effectively a run-out of the remaining machines, with minor changes.

There was never a production PE125 machine; though a lightweight (87.5 kg) prototype PE125 was raced by Dwight Rudder on the ISDT team in 1981 at Elba, Italy.

== Road legality ==
In various countries the laws mandated that road-registered machines have lights/horn/blinkers/stop lights/mirrors in various permutations. In some countries this led to unusually large rear tail-light assemblies and round red reflex safety reflectors on some models, as Suzuki ensured their compliance with local design rules. All PE's came fitted with effective mufflers, with restrictors and double-walled expansion chambers (with mesh) to meet noise and spark restrictor laws where applicable.

The USA machines usually came standard with a trip-meter and minimal AC lighting, with a speedometer as an option, whereas PE's in Australia and Belgium (for example) had speedometers, stop lights, horn, 6V DC battery and charging system to suit, by law. The UK machines did not have indicators or battery; however these did come with an AC horn. The lighting requirements varied across years and countries, so a PE in the UK, South Africa or France might have substantially different rear tail-lights and mounting assemblies to those in the USA. The French PE's (for example) continued to use the PE250B style headlamp shell, with a parking light and a yellow globe insert, due to local regulations.

Also some countries (UK for example) required an alloy fuel tank rather than plastic, which is almost identical to the PE250B tank, but with altered front mounting-strap tabs. The capacity of the plastic fuel tanks varied from 12litres to 10.6litres on various models, without any obvious visual differences, possibly due to mould thickness. Suzuki usually supplied the PE with one of three different brands of tyre depending on local requirements. The standard tyre was the IRC, however some years and countries saw other brands such as Bridgestone or Dunlop fitted (run at 5-11PSI).

== Competition ==
Suzuki were committed to international enduro racing from 1976 until they pulled out in 1982.

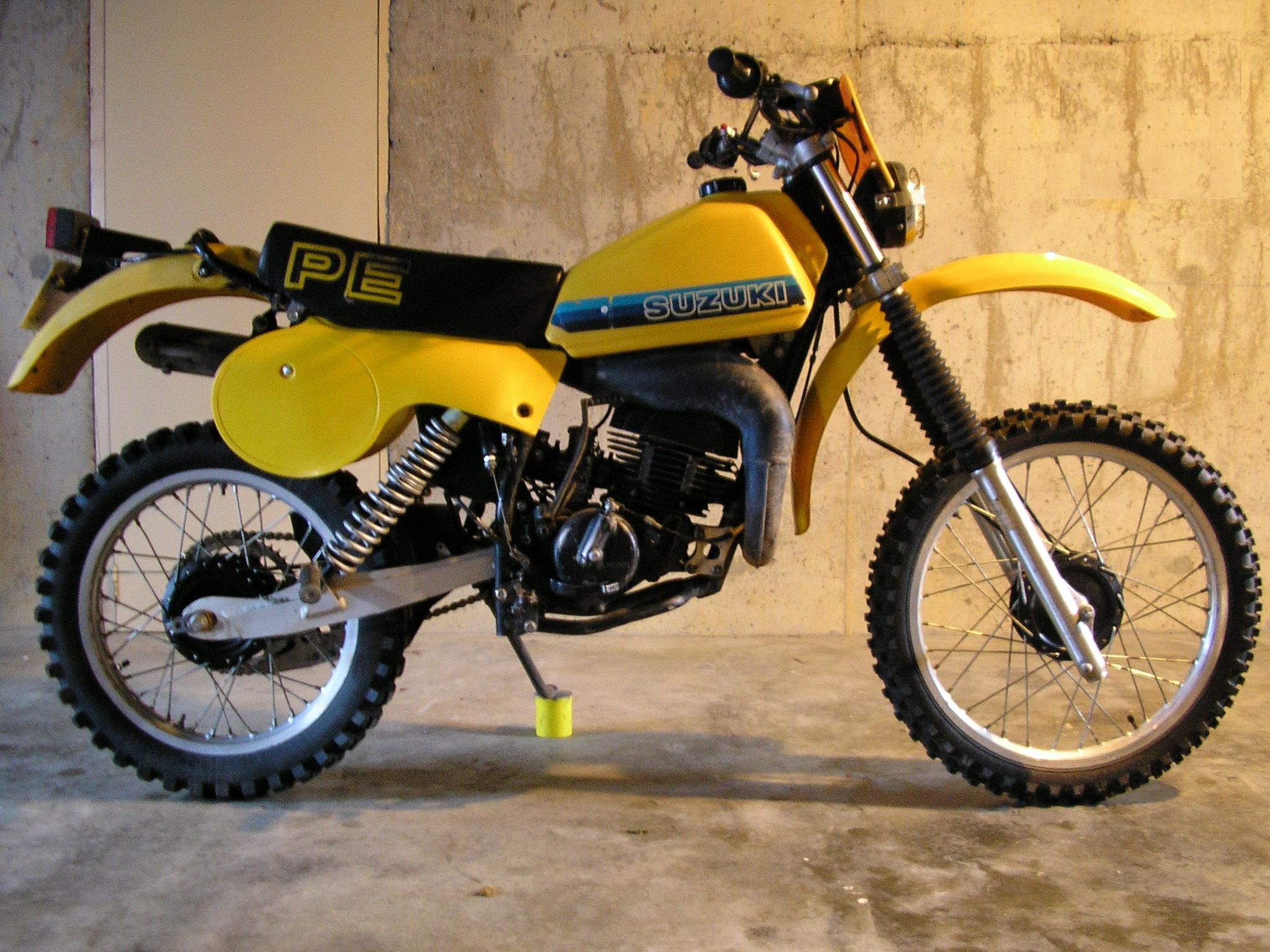
1981 PE 175 X

In the UK, Graham Beamish and his staff worked out the characteristics for the ideal enduro machine and sent them to Japan during the winter of 1975. On the other side of the Atlantic Ocean, in 1975 US Suzuki requested John Morgan (who had been campaigning a modified TS250 with great success) to select three additional riders and compete in four National Enduros that year. Then in 1976, they continued to develop the PE250 and competed in a number of events with just one rider, Teddy Worrell, who did quite well. The next year, 1977, was the start of Team Suzuki, which competed in National Enduros and IDSE Qualifiers and the US team went to the ISDT in Czechoslovakia (widely considered one of the toughest ISDT events ever) with three riders comprising Teddy Worrell, Dave Hulse and Bruce Kenny. This left John Morgan and mechanic Aki Goto to address DNF's due to ring seizures on all three machines.

The competition development of the PE drew heavily upon the American test team and the factory put a lot of trust in the development riders and their recommendations - much of which found its way into the production machines. For example, R&D for the first generation PE175 was one task of Drew Smith and Mike Rosso. Herluf Johnson, Ted Worrell and Gus Blakely all played major parts in development. Drew Smith, for example, made most of the pipes for all the Team Suzuki bikes. The team generally used Works Performance shock-absorbers, while working with the major Japanese companies, Kayaba and Showa, trying to develop an improved shock-absorber design.

At the peak there were 16 riders representing Team Suzuki in the US. Some were National Enduro and some were ISDE - some were both.

A selection of well-known enduro racers from that period were:

- British Trophy Team riders Ted Thompson, Ernie Page and Brian Higgins all rode PE250B's to Gold in 1976 (Zeltweg, Austria).
- Tom Penton, who scored his sixth ISDT Gold when he competed in his final event (High Chaparral, Sweden) in 1978, riding a factory Suzuki PE175 entry.
- Don Cichocki, Mike Rosso and Dave Hulse all earned Gold on the new PE175's at Sweden.
- Gary Edmond attained Gold at Sweden in the 350cc class, riding a special enlarged PE250 - a precursor to the later PE400.
- Jeff Fredette was recruited by Suzuki in 1979 and raced aboard a PE250. He earned gold medals at the 1979, 1980 and 1981 ISDE events in Germany, France and Italy. In 1981 he was also the overall winner of West Virginia's prestigious Blackwater 100.
- "Diamond" Drew Smith earned gold medals at the 1978 (High Chaparral, Sweden), 1979 (Lager Stegskopf, West Germany) and 1981 (Isola d'Elba, Italy) ISDE's on a PE250. Drew campaigned for most of the 1980 season with a broken wrist!
- Ray Cosgrove attained Gold in 1979 (West Germany) as a privateer on a PE250. He then joined US Team Suzuki as their PE400 rider. He followed this by earning a silver medal at Brioude, France in 1980.
- Dwight Rudder, Dave Hulse and Mike Rosso each earned a Silver at the 1979 ISDE (Lager Stegskopf, West Germany) on PE175's, while Don Cichocki earned a bronze medal.
- "Iron Man" Mike Rosso was the top qualifying US 2-day rider in the 175cc division for 1979 and again showed his skill, with Gold on the PE175 at the 1980 ISDE in Brioude, France.
- Geoff Udy of Australia achieved a Bronze on one of the first PE400's into Europe for the 1980 ISDE.
- Dwight Rudder also earned a silver medal with the unique PE125 prototype at the (Isola d'Elba, Italy) 1981 ISDE.

== Timeline ==
1977

PE250B initially released. 12-litres/3.2 (US) gallon aluminium tank, speedometer, skid-plate, lower compression, milder porting, heavier flywheel, lighting, much more silencing, wider gear ratios, 25mm shorter ("A" length) shocks & forks versus the RM250B. The very earliest PE250B's came with Akront rims, then onward, all came with Takasago rims. The 'Pure Enduro IRC Volcano' was fitted on the rear and the IRC Motocross GS-56 on the front.

1978

PE250C released - 30+ detail improvements over the 250B. Main improvements were altered 3rd gear ratio, new leading-axle forks, longer rear shock absorbers, altered fork rake, new conical front hub, improved magneto coils, new headlight & tail-light assemblies, plastic 12 litre tank, optional trip-meter, optional centre-stand, engine bash-plate changed, timing, porting and crankshaft changes. New "All-in-one" tool on fork, stronger foot-pegs, rock-guard on swing-arm.

PE175C released. Based upon the RM125A frame and the RM100/125 B & C running gear. No Squish-band, wider ratios, two additional clutch plates and a 32mm carburettor. Plastic 11 litre tank, except in UK (2.6 gallon alloy). Optional centre-stand. "All-in-one" tool on fork, rock-guard on swing-arm.

1979

PE250N virtually identical, apart from muffler, minor porting and timing changes, Slightly higher compression. Snail-cam adjusters to assist with new quick-change swing-arm slots. Slightly different steering head angle. Horn/blinkers/battery fitted in Australia, Belgium, South Africa. Improved all-in-one tool.

PE175N also virtually identical to the 175C, includes floating rear brake, Snail-cam adjusters to assist with new quick change swing-arm slots. Timing changed, porting and larger 34mm Mikuni carburettor. blinkers/battery fitted in Australia, Belgium and South Africa. Improved all-in-one tool.

1980

PE400T released. Totally new engine NOT based upon RM400, into the PE250T frame. Any/all non-engine changes are effectively same as PE250T, with slight changes to the shocks, air-box boot and muffler. 36mm carburettor has different slide cutaway and jet needle to the 250. The engine was very tractable and had excellent mid-range. 250/400 use a new larger magneto rotor/flywheel. Superb quick-change rear wheel system. 6 clutch plates vs. 5 in the 250. Improved all-in-one tool. Air-assisted forks. New chain guide (with rollers).

PE250T based upon RM250T frame. Alloy swing-arm, superb quick-change rear wheel, sixth gear and a straight-pull throttle. Steering head angle, timing altered. No centre-stand option. 36mm carburettor, modified RM250T engine cases, 6-port, higher-compression, stainless steel reeds, chain guide, larger magneto rotor/flywheel. Longer suspension, air-assisted forks. Improved all-in-one tool.

PE175T alloy swing-arm, superb quick-change rear wheel. New cases, based on RM125T. New stud pattern, larger fins, additional transfer ports, timing altered. Circa 5HP more powerful (top-end) than the earlier C/N series engine. Used the standard (small) magneto rotor/flywheel. Circle-pull throttle. Tapered head-steam bearings, air-assisted forks. 10.6 litre fuel tank. Improved all-in-one tool. New chain guide (with rollers).

1981

PE400X Some of the changes: bash plate gone (replaced with frame rails), improved chain guide (nylon block added), new cylinder head, 5th gear altered, stronger rims & spokes, gear-shift lever, revised muffler mounting.

PE250X Some of the changes: bash plate gone (replaced with frame rails), improved chain guide (nylon block added), altered porting, stronger rims and spokes, gear-shift lever, RM250T air-filter. Revised muffler mounting.

PE175X Some of the changes: bash plate gone (replaced with frame rails), improved chain guide (nylon block added), new piston, altered porting, lowered compression, timing changes, muffler altered, stronger rims & spokes, gear-shift lever. Revised muffler mounting.

1982

PE400Z only made available in tiny numbers in very few countries. Some of the changes: dog-leg levers, folding tip for gear and brake levers, new sprocket cover and larger side-stand foot. Improved chain guide (nylon blocks).

PE250Z also only available in very few countries. Dog-leg levers, folding tip for gear and brake levers, new sprocket cover and larger side-stand foot. Improved chain guide (all nylon blocks).

PE175Z released, based on RM125X - FULL FLOATER suspension. Larger 38mm forks. Centre-stand again optional. Minor porting changes. New muffler, altered gear ratios, straight-pull spokes, new sprocket cover and larger side-stand foot. Improved chain guide (all nylon blocks). An excellent machine.

1983

PE175D only model still available. Some of the changes: damping, gearing changes, handlebars from RM500D, fork air valves from DR500D.

1984

PE175E the final machine released. Some of the changes: new side-stand, gearing changes, damping changes, fork protectors. handlebars from RM500E.

== Variations ==
In the USA market, it became apparent that a cheaper 'fun bike' midway between the DS trail-bike and the PE/RM Series racers was desired. This resulted in the RS175 and RS250 being released in 1980 and 1981. These had detuned PE engines (milder porting and smaller carburettors), softer suspension, RM125N frame geometry, steel (RM100T) swing-arm, DS series lighting and a small RM fuel tank, DR400 forks. Components were drawn from a variety of older model parts bins.

== Quick-change rear wheel ==
The 1979 'N' series machines introduced a slotted section at the rear of the swing-arm, to allow the wheel, with axle, to be withdrawn. There were two bolts behind the axle to undo and remove, then take the brake cable nut and slip off the chain. The rear wheel then slipped out to the rear. The snail-cam adjusters made the re-installation and tensioning of the chain a far faster task than on the earlier models.

For the 1980 'T' range, Suzuki developed a much improved system that was widely praised for its intelligent design. You simply lay the machine on its left side, remove the axle, slip out a spacer and lift the wheel away from the cush-drive, without disturbing the chain or rear brake. Re-installation involved engaging the wheel hub to the brake drum/sprocket carrier, sliding in the one long spacer on the right side of the wheel, and then installing and tightening the axle.
