= Suzuki RM85 =

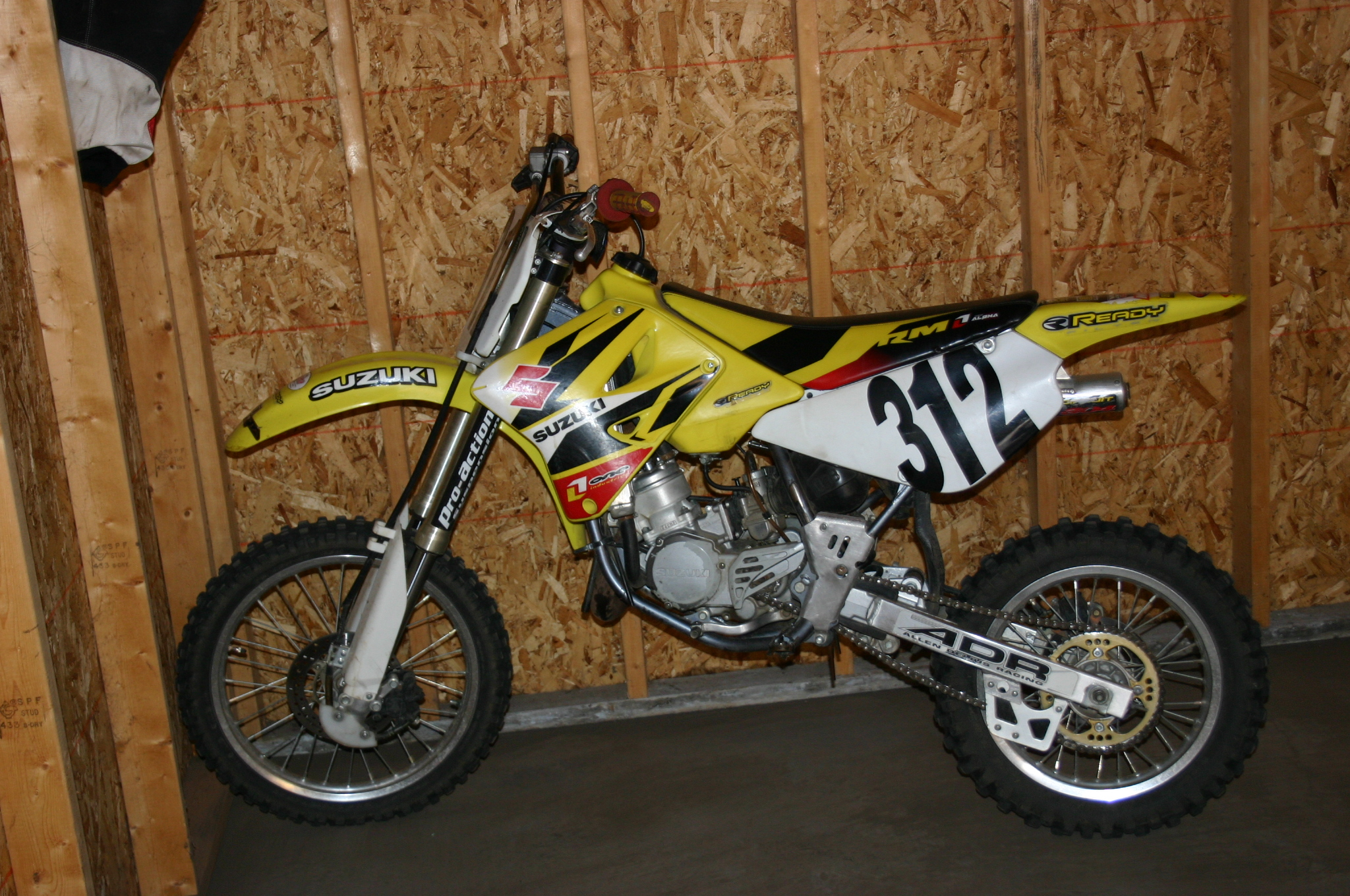
- Small-Wheel Suzuki RM85
- Manufacturer: Suzuki
- Class: Off-road
- Engine: 84.7 cc (5.17 cu in), 2-stroke, liquid-cooled, single
- Bore / stroke: 48 mm × 46.8 mm (1.89 in × 1.84 in)
- Top speed: 60-68 Mph (96-110 Kmh)
- Power: 25-30 Hp
- Ignition type: Electronic CDI
- Transmission: 6-speed constant mesh manual
- Suspension: Front: Inverted fork, pneumatic/coil spring, oil damped Rear: Link type, coil spring, oil damped
- Brakes: Disc brakes, single rotor
- Tires: Tubed tires
- Wheelbase: 1,475 millimetres (58.1 in)
- Dimensions: L: 1,805 millimetres (71.1 in); W: 735 millimetres (28.9 in); H: 325 millimetres (12.8 in)
- Seat height: 850.9 millimetres (33.50 in)
- Fuel capacity: 5 litres (1.3 US gal)
- Oil capacity: n/a - premix

The Suzuki RM85 is a motocross bike created and manufactured by Suzuki.

It was produced from 2002 to 2023. It has a maximum speed of 60–68 miles per hour (96-110 kilometers per hour). The RM85L is the big wheel version of the RM85. In the 85cc class, the RM85 has the same horsepower as the KX85 around 25-30HP. The RM85 is known for its bottom to mid power, and turning ability. It is best suited for teenagers 12–16, or 4' 10" to 5' 5", but the big wheel can be used by larger riders.

== See also ==
- Suzuki RM series

== Notes ==
- Suzuki Website
