= Suzuki RM series =

Japanese motorcycle, introduced 1975

The RM series is a model range of two-stroke motorcycles manufactured by Suzuki. The letters "RM" stand for "Racing Machine" and the motorcycles produced with this prefix in their model names are suited to use in motocross racing.

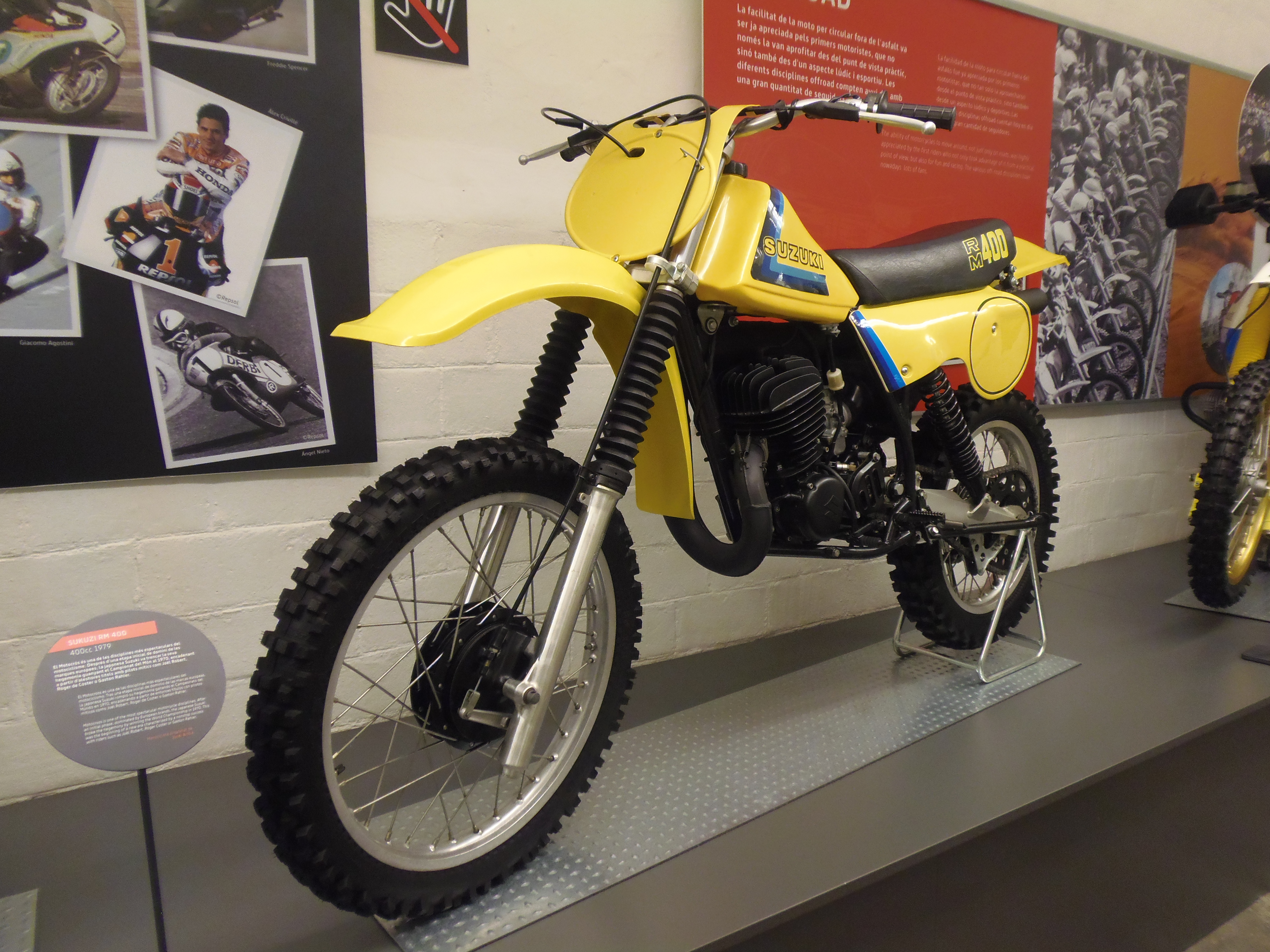
A 1979 Suzuki RM400

== History ==
The first in the range was introduced in 1972 with the RM125M, This bike was plagued by mechanical issues (nearly all seized). and a half year model, the RM "S" was rushed out along with a kit of the "S" changes for M owners. The M model is now rare as most were converted to S specs. (ported barrel, bigger carb and different CDI) these were the last of the down pipe RM's and were followed by the RM125A, RM250A, and RM370A in 1976. Preceding the RM lineup was the TM series, which included the TM75, TM100, TM125, TM250, and TM400. Motorcycles within the RM series continue to be manufactured today, the famous RM125 was discontinued in America in late 2008 . The 100 cc RM100 was discontinued in 2005. The RM250 was discontinued by the 2008 model year. This may possibly be related to changed class structure. From 1999 to 2004, changes to the RM250 made 15 more stock horsepower, and a lower seat height.

The RM series has largely been replaced (apart from the RM85) by the RM-Z series featuring four-stroke engines but the RM models remain popular with enthusiasts.

== RM125 and RM250 ==
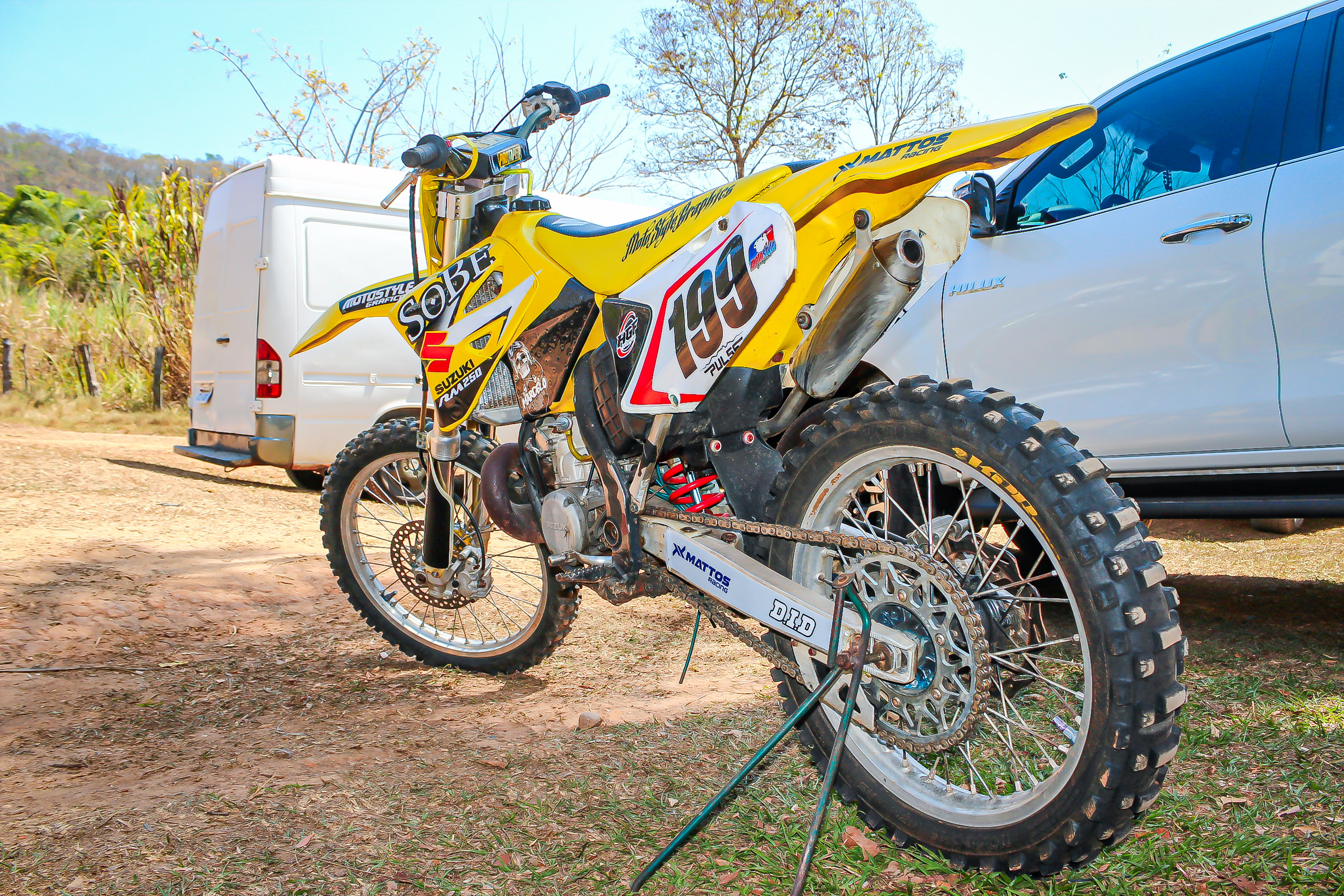
Suzuki RM250

The Suzuki RM125 and RM250 began production in 1975 and continued until 2008. The RM125 and RM250 were discontinued due to the decrease in demand for two-stroke motocross bikes. The 2007 model had an approximate output of 41.06 wheel horsepower (30.2 kW) at 11,500 rpm, and 30.2 nm of torque at 10,500 rpm.

== Models ==
- RM50
- RM60
- RM65
- RM80
- RM85
- RM100
- RM125
- RM250
- RM370
- RM400
- RM465
- RM500
