= The Spa, Scarborough =

Entertainment venue in Scarborough, North Yorkshire, England

Scarborough Spa
- Former names: Scarborough Spa Complex
- Alternative names: The Spa, Scarborough

General information
- Type: Conference, exhibition, entertainment and live music venue
- Location: South Bay, Scarborough, North Yorkshire, England
- Coordinates: 54°16′32″N 0°23′50″W (grid reference TA0487)
- Current tenants: North Yorkshire Council
- Owner: North Yorkshire Council

Design and construction
- Architect: Sir Joseph Paxton

Website
- www.scarboroughspa.co.uk

Listed Building – Grade II*
- Official name: The Spa
- Designated: 8 June 1973
- Reference no.: 1259818

Scarborough Spa is a Grade II* listed building in South Bay, Scarborough, North Yorkshire, England. It is a venue for conferences, exhibitions, entertainment, live music and events on the Yorkshire Coast. Originally built around the source of Scarborough's spa waters, it is owned and managed by North Yorkshire Council.

The Spa has a Grand Hall, which seats 1,500 and hosts live entertainment including the Scarborough Spa Orchestra and the annual Scarborough Jazz Festival. The Spa Theatre, a 557-seat Victorian theatre, is home to summer season shows and Christmas pantomimes. The Spa Ocean Room is used for dances, conferences and other events, including the Scarborough Jazz Festival and Coastival.

The Victorian Cliff Tramway is a funicular railway that runs through the South Cliff Gardens and links the Spa complex with the top of South Cliff, 200 ft above the South Bay.

== History ==
=== 17th century ===
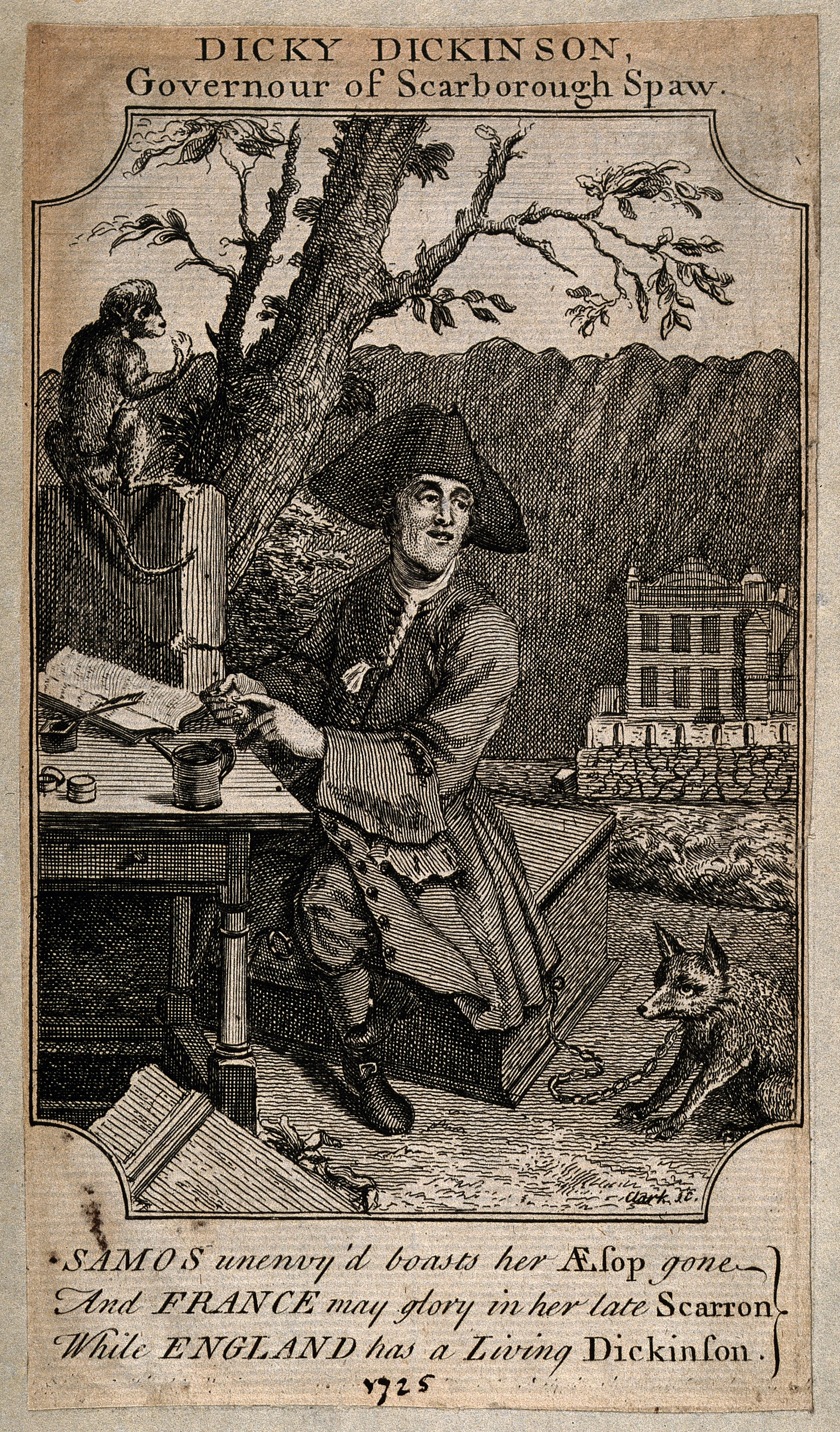
Dicky Dickinson, Governor of Scarborough Spaw

In the 17th century, spa waters were discovered by Thomasin Farrer, the wife of one of Scarborough's leading citizens, John Farrer. She found natural spring water bubbling out beneath the cliff to the south of the town. The waters, which stained the rocks a russet colour, tasted slightly bitter and were said to cure minor ailments. She told her friends and neighbours about the medicinal effects and drinking the spa waters became an accepted medicine. Later, thousands of visitors flocked to benefit from their supposed medicinal qualities. The southern part of Scarborough became popular. The precursor to the present Scarborough Spa complex became a fashionable attraction.

=== 18th century ===
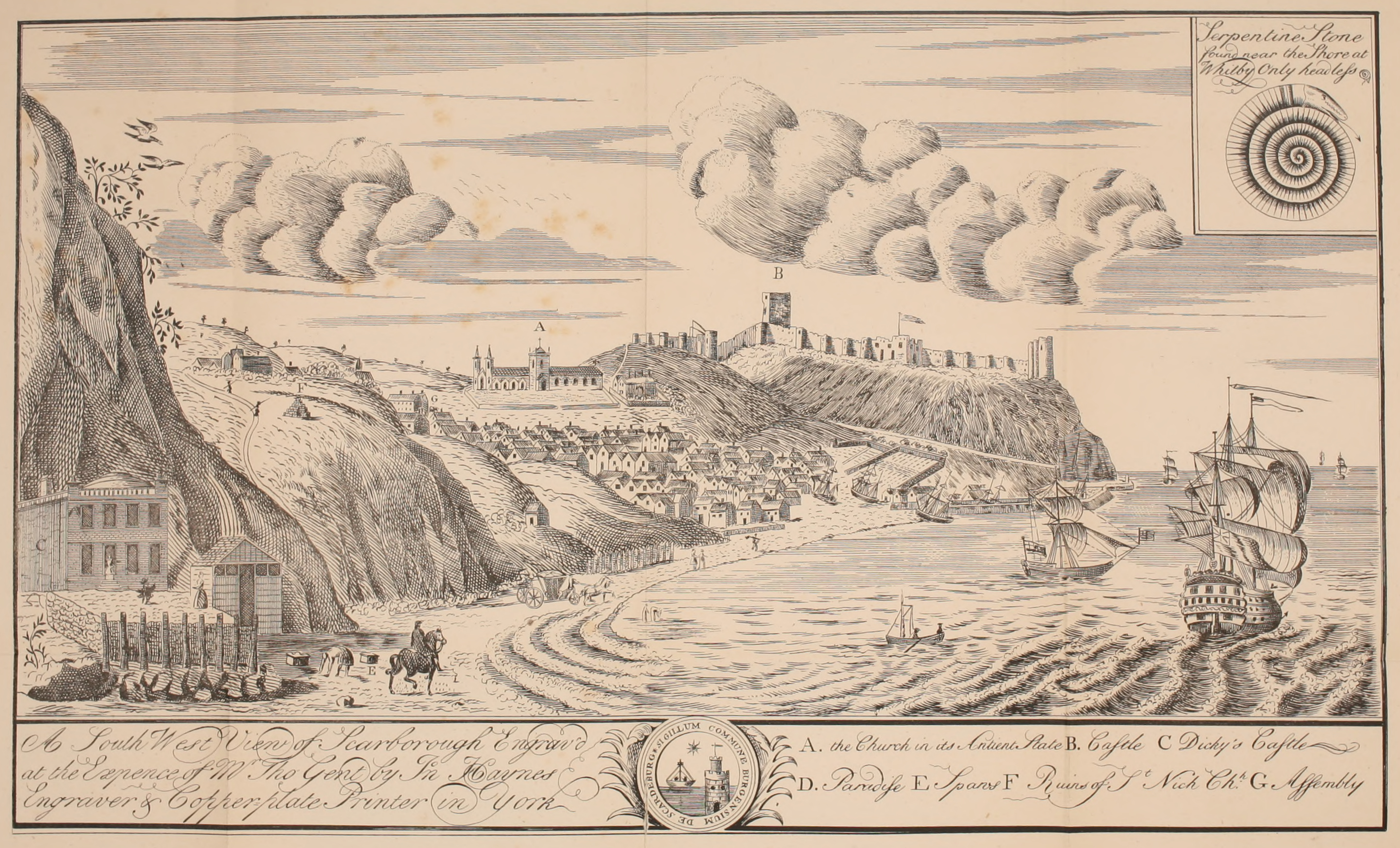
Eighteenth century of Scarborough, showing the "spaws" in the left foreground

The first Spaw House (a term used until the early 19th century) was built on or near the site in the early 1700s, and Dicky Dickinson, a great character, was appointed its governor. The house, a wooden structure where the waters were sold and dispensed, provided basic amenities to visitors eager to try their curative effects. The water was also bottled and sold further afield.

By the mid-1700s, Scarborough was established as a seaside resort and a spa town, with horse racing on the beach, boating and sea-bathing. Scarborough was one of the first places to use bathing machines. In 1737, a major cliff fall obliterated the house and the wells. Within five weeks, the wells were uncovered. Then, two distinct types of water, both said to have their own particular restorative or health-giving powers, were evident.

The speed at which the wells were reinstated after such a catastrophe shows their importance to the town. In 1739, a sizeable building or saloon with views over the sea was constructed, and the wells were accessed by a long flight of stairs.

=== 19th century ===
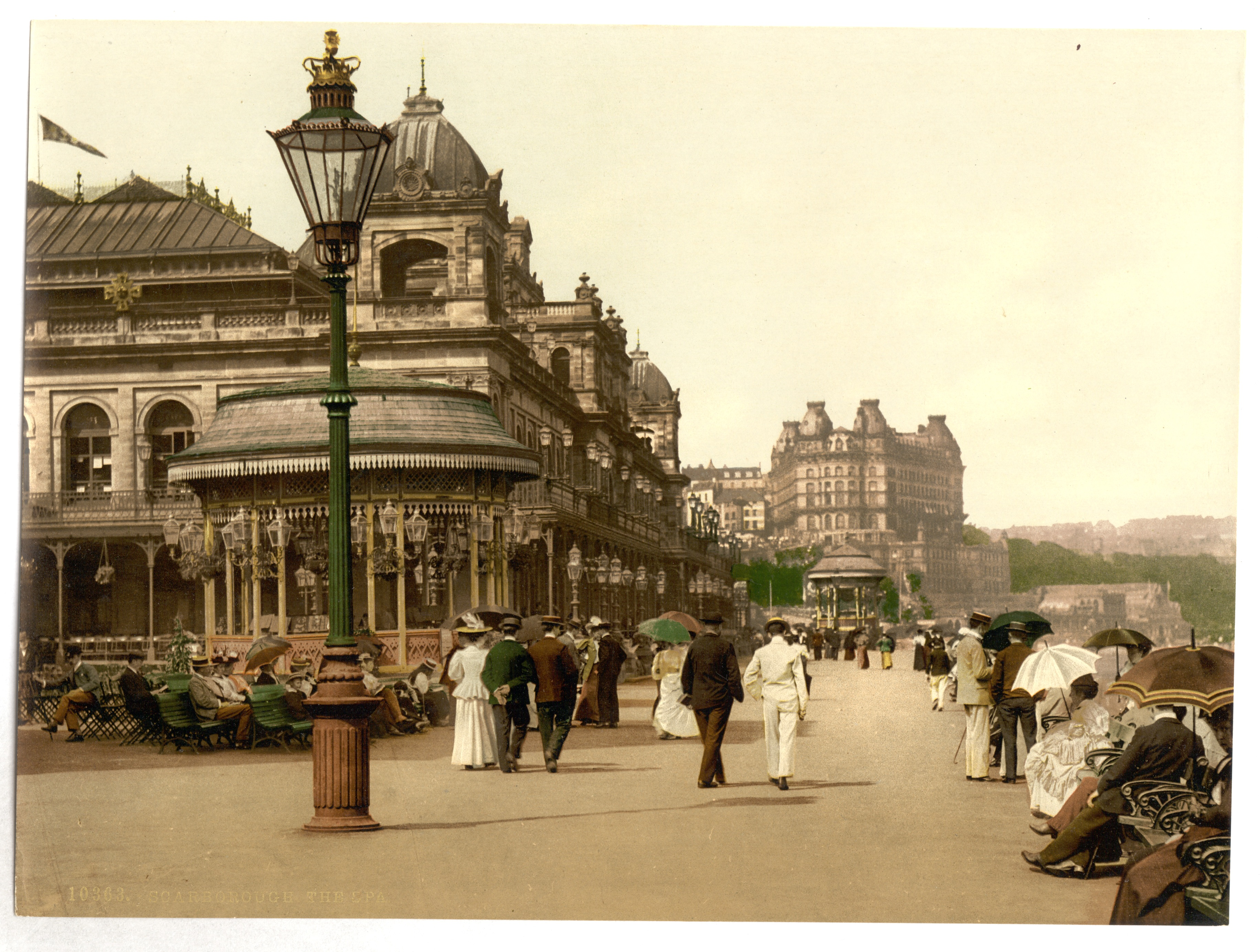
Nineteenth century strollers in front of the Spa

Disasters that befell the spa in the 1800s were countered by stylish new buildings and facilities showing its importance and popularity. In 1827, the Cliff Bridge opened, improving access, and was a foretaste of ambitious plans. The Gothic Saloon designed by Henry Wyatt opened in 1839 and had a concert hall, a garden, promenade and external area for orchestral concerts. By the time it opened, the Gothic Saloon, an impressive turreted building, was too small.

Joseph Paxton, the landscape gardener and architect responsible for the grounds of Chatsworth House, designed the complex that opened in 1858. It comprised a central assembly hall with adjoining galleries and outside, the sea wall was extended to encompass a double promenade and carriage road, a colonnade with shops, an open air bandstand and the prospect tower. The Spa became the most popular music hall venue outside London. In 1875, the first cliff tram in England was built to provide additional access; it remains in use today.

On 8 September 1876, the Spa saloon was destroyed by fire, but no time was lost in rebuilding it and by June 1879, the new Grand Hall was open to the public, with the formal opening ceremony taking place on 2 August 1880.

South facade

=== 20th century ===
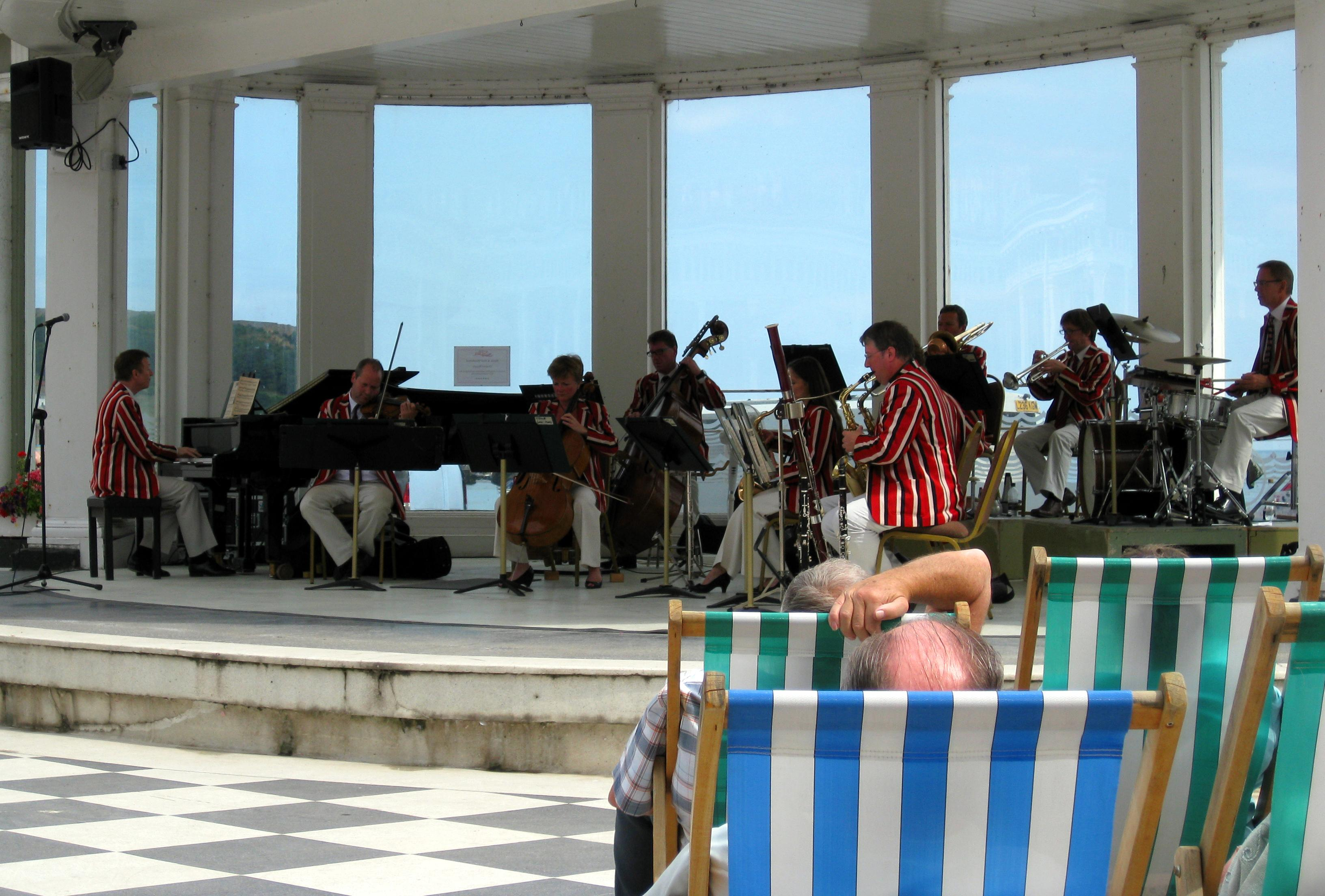
The Scarborough Spa Orchestra, the last surviving professional seaside orchestra, give a concert of light music (August 2009)

Visitors to the Spa can see the architecture of the 1880s and the scale and style of its Grand Hall. Additions and alterations have been made, and a major restoration programme was carried out in the early 1980s to reinstate some original features and decorative styles. The Spa includes the Spa Theatre, Grand Hall for concerts, Ocean Room, Promenade Lounge and Sun Court for open air concerts cafes and bars. From the colonnade shops to the Cliff Lift, the complex is nearly half a mile in length and can accommodate conferences of 2,000 or more delegates.

Actors that have visited the Spa or have been filmed here include Helena Bonham-Carter and Rick Mayall in Dancing Queen and Ewan McGregor and Jane Horrocks were filmed in the Sun Court for Little Voice.

By the 1880s, the importance of music and entertainment was beginning to surpass interest in the spa waters. Their chemical composition altered over the years, and public consumption ceased in the late 1960s. Current health and safety legislation prohibits public access to what remains of the well, which is located beneath the island, opposite the shops.

== Spa Bridge ==
Spa Bridge

The Spa was accessible by a walk along the South Bay seafront for visitors to Scarborough Castle, Scarborough Harbour, and other attractions near the town centre, but there was a steep descent to the seafront from St Nicholas Cliff. In 1826, the Cliff Bridge Company leased the Spa from the corporation; to maximise the number of paying customers erected, an iron footbridge to span the valley from St Nicholas Cliff to the Spa. It was 75 feet (23 m) above the valley and 414 feet (126 m) long and 13.5 feet (4.1 m) wide. The bridge opened on 19 July 1827, and crowds flocked to see a mail coach and horses gallop at full speed across it. The bridge became a fashionable promenade and provided views and a link from the town centre. It proved so popular that a toll booth was put up at the St Nicholas Cliff end. Season tickets were sold giving access to the bridge and Spa for one, two or four weeks.

== See also ==
- Grade II* listed buildings in North Yorkshire (district)
- Listed buildings in Scarborough (Ramshill Ward)
