= Scarborough Pier Lighthouse =

Lighthouse in Scarborough, North Yorkshire, England

Scarborough Pier Lighthouse Vincent Pier
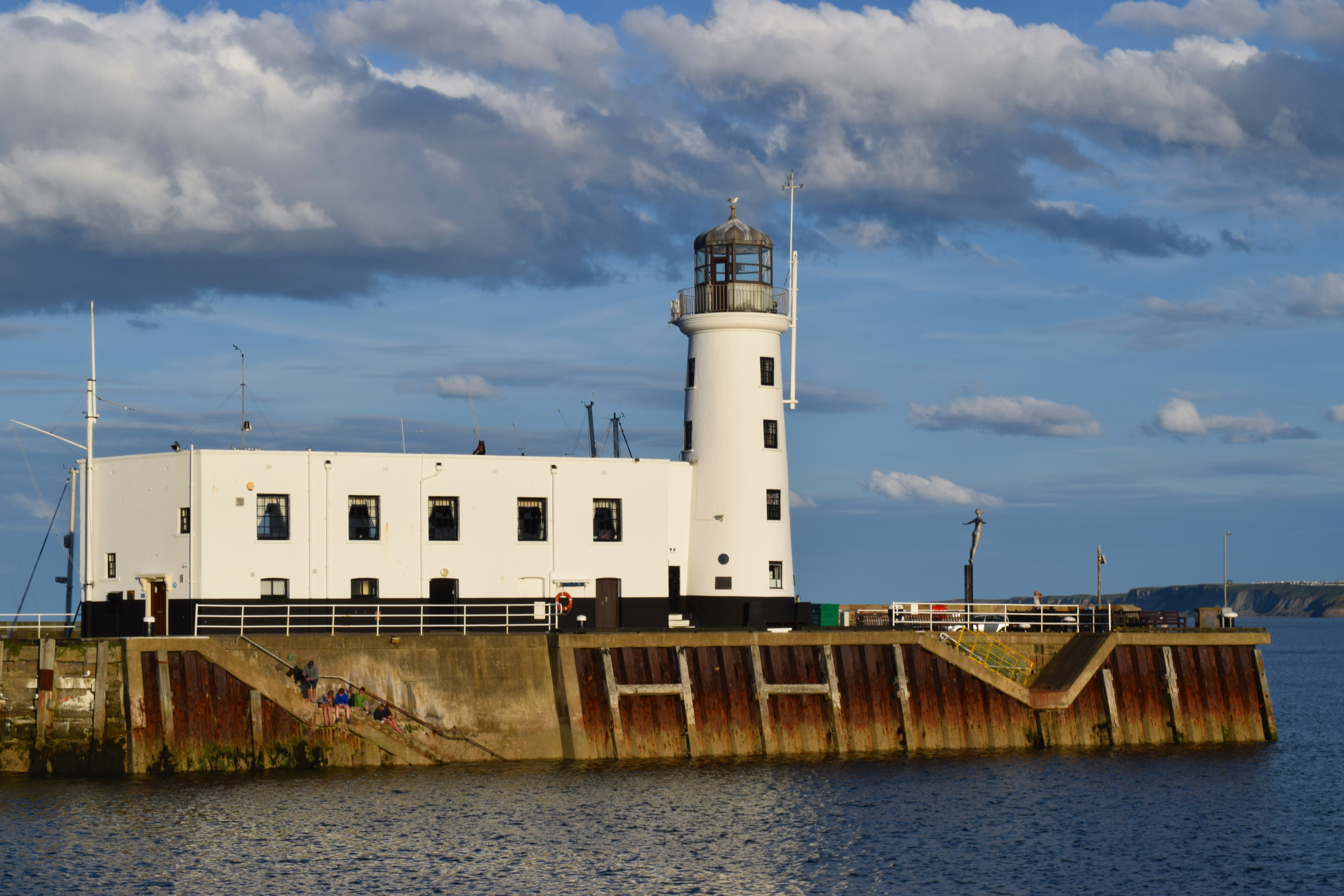
- Scarborough lighthouse, home to Scarborough Yacht Club
- Location: Scarborough, England
- OS grid: TA0492288556
- Coordinates: 54.281882°N 0.389905°W

Tower
- Constructed: 1806 (first)
- Construction: brick tower
- Height: 15 metres (49 ft)
- Shape: cylindrical tower with balcony and lantern attached to a 2-storey keeper's house used as clubhouse by the Scarborough Yacht Club since 1952
- Markings: white tower, lantern and keeper's house
- Power source: mains electricity
- Operator: North Yorkshire Council
- Fog signal: blast every 60s.

Light
- First lit: 1931 (current)
- Deactivated: 1914–1931 (first)
- Focal height: 17 metres (56 ft)
- Range: 9 nmi (17 km; 10 mi)
- Characteristic: Iso W 5s.

Listed Building – Grade II
- Designated: 8 June 1973
- Reference no.: 1259819

Scarborough Pier Lighthouse is an active aid to navigation on Vincent Pier in Scarborough, North Yorkshire, owned and operated by North Yorkshire Council. The lighthouse dates from 1806, but it had to be rebuilt following damage sustained in the German bombardment of 1914.

== History ==
In 1732, an act of Parliament, the Scarborough Harbour Act 1731 (5 Geo. 2. c. 11), was passed 'to Enlarge the Pier and Harbour of Scarborough, in the County of York'. Twenty years later, the work to extend the old pier, which dated from the 14th century, was undertaken by an engineer named William Vincent (whose name subsequently came to be linked to the new structure).

=== 19th century ===
The earliest reference to a light being shown from Vincent Pier is from 1804, and by 1806 it is definitively described as having a lighthouse on it, designed and built by a surveyor named Nixon: a circular brick building with a flat roof, on top of which is a coal-fired brazier. It operated as a tide light (being lit only 'from half flood to half ebb'). Before long, the brazier was removed and the light was instead provided by six tallow candles, placed in a light-room within the tower, from which they were displayed through an oblong window. Initially a tin lining enhanced the flame; by 1818 a copper reflector had been installed.

Substantial improvements were undertaken in 1843, when the tower was increased in height by 17 ft (5.2 m) to a total height of 51 ft (16 m); at the same time, new accommodation was provided alongside for the harbour master and keeper. The following year, a new lantern room was added and within it the latest form of Bude-Light was installed, fed by a connection to the town's gas works. It shone red to seaward and white towards the harbour and was visible for up to 13 nautical miles (24 km; 15 mi). At night the lamp was lit, and during the day a red flag was flown, as long as there was 12 ft (3.7 m) depth of water between the piers and 10 ft (3.0 m) within the harbour itself. (Later, a ball-shaped day mark replaced the use of the flag.) The Bude-Light, though very bright, was very costly in its gas consumption, and in 1845 it was replaced with a much smaller 4-inch five-mantle gas burner, with a range of just 4 nmi (7.4 km; 4.6 mi). In 1850 an additional storey was added to the accommodation block.

=== 20th century ===
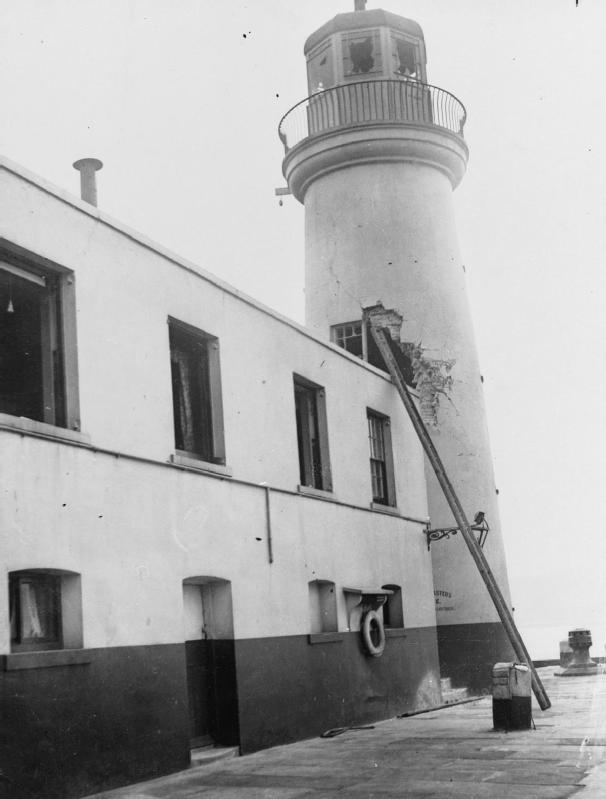
The lighthouse in the aftermath of the raid.

By the time of the First World War, the lighthouse had been converted to electric power. On 16 December 1914, the Imperial German Navy conducted a raid on Scarborough, Hartlepool and Whitby. Scarborough was hit by 520s shells and eighteen townspeople were killed. The last shot fired at the town hit the centre of the lighthouse; while the shell did not explode, it caused sufficient structural damage to leave the tower highly unstable. Three days later, the top half was demolished. No public funds were available for its rebuilding, and it was only insured for £500. After the war, the Scarborough Townsmen's Guild sought donations from the public to cover the cost of the repairs; they eventually raised £2,225 in this way, and on 22 December 1931 the rebuilt lighthouse was relit. The rebuilt tower was 49 ft (15 m) tall, topped with an octagonal lantern. Initially it showed a red light, but there were complaints that this was no longer distinguishable from the lights of the town, so its characteristic was changed to a white isophase light. It was also provided with a fog horn.

The lighthouse in 2026

The adjacent lodgings were vacated by the harbour master in 1937; since 1952 they have served as the headquarters of Scarborough Yacht Club. In 1940, responsibility for managing the light was transferred from the Harbour Commissioners to the Borough Council.
