= Cliff Bridge, Scarborough =

Bridge in Scarborough, North Yorkshire, England

Coordinates: 54.2791°N 0.3983°W

The Cliff Bridge viewed from the valley

The Cliff Bridge, previously known as the Spa Bridge, is a footbridge in Scarborough, North Yorkshire, England. Spanning the valley from St Nicholas Cliff to The Spa, it was completed in 1827 and is a Grade II listed building.

The bridge has four segmental braced iron arches on plain tapering stone piers with stone abutments; its walkway is 414 feet (126 m) long. It is a rare example of a multiple-span cast iron bridge.

== History ==
Arches of the bridge

With the discovery of spa waters in Scarborough in the 17th century, the southern part of the town began to receive thousands of visitors. However, although it was easy to access the Spa from the South Bay seafront, a steep descent was required to reach it from the St Nicholas Cliff area of the town.

To give access to original "Spaw" and its mineral spring, the new Cliff Bridge Company was formed in 1826 to lease the Spa from the corporation to maximise its commercial potential by erecting an elegant iron footbridge to span the chasm of the valley from St Nicholas Cliff to the Spa. It is 75 ft (23 m) above the valley, 414 ft (126 m) long and 13.5 ft (4.1 m) wide.

The pedestrian footway with a view of the Grand Hotel

By only the next year, it was completed, though despite its fast speed of construction, it came at a cost of around £7,000 (equivalent to £640,000 in 2025), double the original estimate. An opening ceremony was held on 19 July 1827, during which a mail coach was pulled by horses at high speed across the bridge. Much used, it soon became a toll bridge, with a booth erected at the St Nicholas Cliff end of the bridge. For regular users, season tickets were available allowing unlimited access to the bridge and Spa for one, two or four week periods.

In 1951, the Corporation of Scarborough purchased the bridge, removing the tolls and demolishing the toll booth.

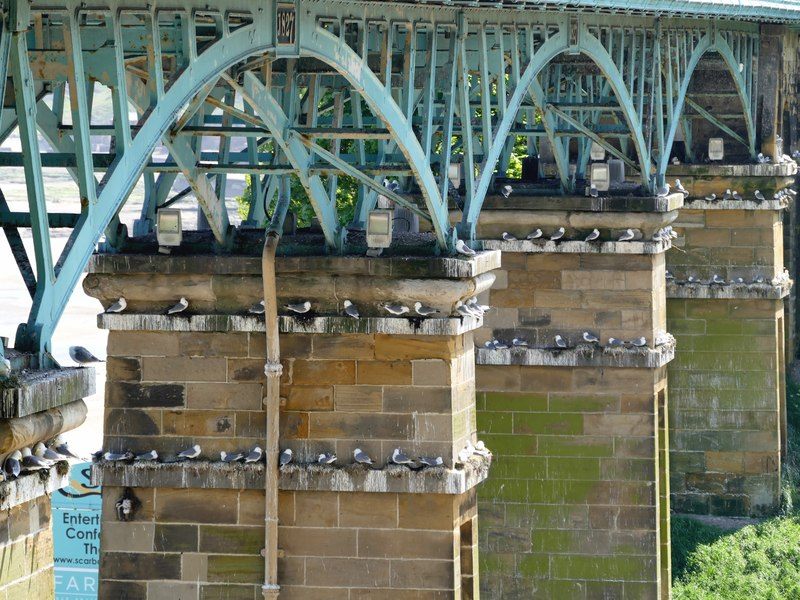
Seagulls occupying the piers under the iron spans

Cliff Bridge is recorded in the National Heritage List for England as a Grade II listed building, having been designated on 22 December 1953. Grade II is the lowest of the three grades of listing, and is applied to "buildings that are nationally important and of special interest".

The bridge was closed to the public from November 2009 through to April 2010 for a £700,000 general renovation project, including new timber beams spanning the full width of the bridge, replacement of the main bridge deck and refurbishment and repainting of all metal components. The bridge refurbishment made North Yorkshire County Council one of three principal winners in the 2011 Historic Bridge and Infrastructure Awards.

== See also ==
- Listed buildings in Scarborough (Castle Ward)
