= Thorgils Skarthi =

Viking leader and poet

Thorgils Skarthi (hare-lip) (Old Norse: Þorgils Skarði) was a Viking leader and poet. He is associated with the founding of Scarborough, England.

Thorgils Skarthi is reputed to have founded Skarðaborg in North Yorkshire, England about 966. The new settlement was later burned to the ground by Tostig Godwinson, Earl of Northumbria and Lord of the Manor of Hougun.

Thorgils Skarthi is described in the Kormáks saga which is principally about his brother, the Icelandic skald, Kormákr Ögmundarson who was the court poet of Norwegian nobleman Sigurd Haakonsson. English chronicler Robert Mannyng of Brunne in his book Story of Inglande (1338) quoted from two lost romances about Þorgils Skarði, including that he had a brother called Fleyn. If so, Kormákr may have had the nickname Fleinn. In that case he may have founded Flamborough in Yorkshire (from Old Norse Fleinaborg). Thorgils and Kormákr came to England (ca. 965) not long after the expedition of King Harald Greycloak of Norway to Bjarmaland, today the area of Arkhangelsk in northern Russia.
