= Scarborough Mere =

Natural lake in North Yorkshire, England

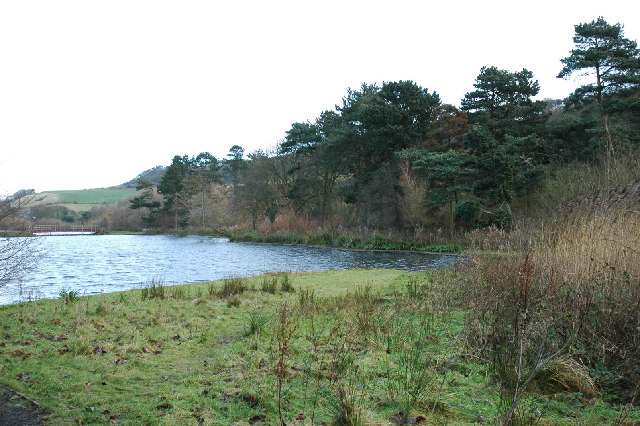
- Southern end of Scarborough Mere

- Location within North Yorkshire
- Location: Scarborough, North Yorkshire, England
- Coordinates: 54°15′35″N 0°24′40″W
- Type: lake
- Surface area: 16 acres (6.5 ha)

Scarborough Mere is a natural lake in the Weaponness Valley, in Scarborough, North Yorkshire, England.

Formerly measuring 40 acres (16 ha) in area, the construction of the York and North Midland Railway line from York to Scarborough bisected the Mere in 1845. Due to that and other factors, including drainage and landscaping, the surface area of the lake is now approximately 16 acres (6.5 ha).

In the 20th century, the Mere was a popular tourist attraction owned by Scarborough Corporation, with rowing boats, a café and putting green. There was also a miniature Spanish galleon – the Hispaniola – which made trips across to 'Treasure Island' where holidaymakers could dig for doubloons. Dredging and maintenance of the lake decreased, and the increased silt and weed meant that waterborne activities stopped.

The Mere is now part of the Oliver's Mount Country Park and is managed by the Scarborough Mere Angling Club as a fishing lake, with the southern end used by waterskiers.

A map dated 1766 by Thomas Bowen in The Gentleman's Magazine shows Scarborough Mere as "a lake called Byard's Lake".
