= SeaGrown =

Seaweed grower in Yorkshire, England

- Company type: Private
- Industry: Macroalgae aquaculture: Food - Sustainable and vegan seaweed-based seasonings; Beauty products
- Founded: 2018
- Founders: Wave Crookes; Laura Robinson
- Headquarters: Scarborough, North Yorkshire, England
- Number of locations: 1
- Website: Official website

SeaGrown is a seaweed farming and processing company based in Scarborough, North Yorkshire, England. It was established in 2018 and in 2019, it was given a grant to be able to grow its own seaweed in a specific area off the coast of Scarborough. It is England's first large-scale, commercial seaweed farm.

== History ==
SeaGrown was formed in 2018 by Wave Crookes and Laura Robinson; Crookes was previously a diver in the Royal Navy who was involved in other maritime occupations, and Robinson is a professor of geochemistry. Initially, the farming of seaweed was literally the two of them cutting seaweed at low tide in and around Scarborough.

At the outset, the company was just the two of them and the seaweed was processed into use as a foodstuff, for pets, bath products and restaurants. The expansion plans, coupled with grants of £500,000 from the Coastal Communities Fund and £25,000 from the Business Enterprise Fund, hope to see the company expand to nine and later 23 to 25 employees. The money also went into buying newer processing equipment.

The company have acquired a 25-acre (10 ha) site, which is 115 feet (35 m) underwater, and some 3 miles (4.8 km) (Note: Some sources state the farm is 4 miles (6.4 km) out to sea.) out into the North Sea off the coast of Scarborough. The farm will have buoys and markers with sunken lines onto which the seaweed will grow. The farm area is well away from shipping lanes and is England's first large-scale, commercial farm for seaweed. Whilst Crookes and Robinson acknowledge that the seaweed farming industry has not taken off in Britain (it is farmed in Holland, Spain and Scandinavia), the coast around Scarborough is good for seaweed "prolifically and naturally."

The company have a processing plant located in the town of Scarborough in North Yorkshire, England. The seaweed will be landed at Scarborough Harbour for onward transportation to the processing plant.

== Accolades ==
In 2019, SeaGrown was announced as the Yorkshire Life magazine's Producer of the Year in their annual Food and Drink Awards.

== Products ==
The harvested seaweed is used in bioplastics and the food industry. In 2020, a Yorkshire-based spirit distiller produced a rum derived from sugar-kelp harvested off the coast of Scarborough.

== See also ==
- Seaweed farming
- Aquaculture in the United Kingdom
