= Scarborough, North Yorkshire =

Town in North Yorkshire, England

Coordinates: 54°16′57″N 0°24′00″W

Scarborough
- Town
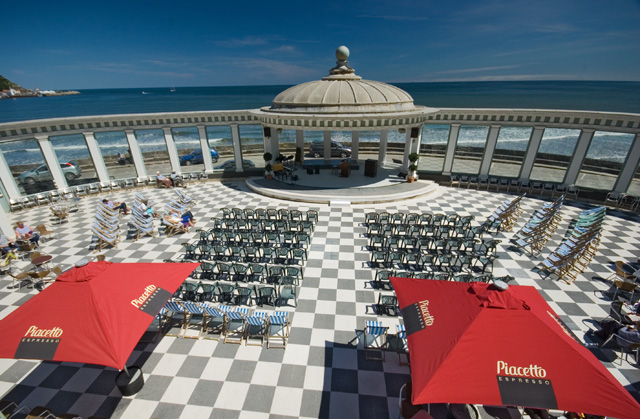
- View of Scarborough's South Bay from the Esplanade The Grand Hotel The Spa Suncourt Cliff Bridge Town Hall Rotunda Museum The Castle

- Location within North Yorkshire
- Population: 61,749 (2011 census)
- Demonym: Scarborian
- OS grid reference: TA040880
  - London: 190 mi (310 km) S
- Civil parish: Scarborough
- Unitary authority: North Yorkshire
- Ceremonial county: North Yorkshire
- Region: Yorkshire and the Humber
- Country: England
- Sovereign state: United Kingdom
- Post town: SCARBOROUGH
- Postcode district: YO11 – YO13
- Dialling code: 01723
- Police: North Yorkshire
- Fire: North Yorkshire
- Ambulance: Yorkshire
- UK Parliament: Scarborough and Whitby

Scarborough (/ˈskɑːbrə/) is a seaside town and civil parish in the district and ceremonial county of North Yorkshire, England. With a population of 61,749, Scarborough is the largest town on the Yorkshire Coast and the fourth-largest settlement in the county.

It is located on the North Sea coast and is on the Cleveland Way long distance footpath which follows the coast through the town. Historically in the North Riding of Yorkshire, the town lies between 10 and 230 feet (3–70 m) above sea level, from Scarborough Harbour rising steeply north and west towards limestone cliffs. The older part of the town lies around the harbour and is protected by a rocky headland that extends into the North Sea.

The town has fishing and service industries, including a growing digital and creative economy, and is a tourist destination. Residents of the town are known as Scarborians.

== Etymology ==
Scarborough was founded by Danes in the 10th century, when Thorgil (also known as Skarthi, meaning 'hare-lip') built a stronghold here – hence 'Skarthi's burh'.

== History ==
=== Origins ===
Scarborough Castle entrance

The town is claimed to have been founded around 966 AD as Skarðaborg [ˈskɑrðɑˌborɡ] by Thorgils Skarthi, a Viking raider. There is no archaeological evidence to support this claim, which was made during the 1960s as part of a pageant of Scarborough events. The claim is based on a fragment of an Icelandic saga. However, due to coastal erosion over the years, evidence may have been lost to the sea. In the 4th century, there was briefly a Roman signal station on Scarborough headland, and there is evidence of earlier settlements, during the Stone Age and Bronze Age. Any settlement between the fifth and ninth centuries would have been burned to the ground by a band of Vikings under Tostig Godwinson (a rival of Thorgils Skarthi), Lord of Falsgrave, or Harald III of Norway. These periodic episodes of destruction and massacre means that very little evidence of settlement during this period remained to be recorded in the Domesday survey of 1085. (The original inland village of Falsgrave was Anglo-Saxon rather than Viking.)

=== Roman period ===
A Roman signal station was built on a cliff-top location overlooking the North Sea. It was one of a chain of signal stations, built to warn of sea-raiders. Coins found at the site show that it was occupied from c. AD 370 until the early fifth century.

In 2021 an excavation at a housing development in Eastfield, south of Scarborough, revealed a Roman luxury villa, religious sanctuary, or combination of both. The building layout is unique in Britain and extends over an area of about the size of two tennis courts. It included a bathhouse and a cylindrical tower with rooms radiating from it. The buildings were "designed by the highest-quality architects in northern Europe in the era and constructed by the finest craftsmen". Historic England described the finds as "one of the most important Roman discoveries in the past decade" and recommended they be protected as a scheduled monument. The housing development layout was revised to incorporate a public green area over the remains which were reburied in 2022.

=== Medieval ===
Scarborough recovered under King Henry II, who built an Angevin stone castle on the headland and granted the town charters in 1155 and 1163, permitting a market on the sands and establishing rule by burgesses.

Edward II granted Scarborough Castle to his favourite, Piers Gaveston. The castle was subsequently besieged by forces led by the barons Percy, Warenne, Clifford and Pembroke. Gaveston was captured and taken to Oxford and thence to Warwick Castle for execution.

In 1318, the town was burnt by the Scots, under Sir James Douglas following the Capture of Berwick upon Tweed.

In the Middle Ages, Scarborough Fair, permitted in a royal charter of 1253, held a six-week trading festival attracting merchants from all over Europe. It ran from Assumption Day, 15 August, until Michaelmas Day, 29 September. The fair continued to be held for 500 years, from the 13th to the 18th century, and is commemorated in the song Scarborough Fair:

Are you going to Scarborough Fair?
—parsley, sage, rosemary and thyme....

=== Resort development ===
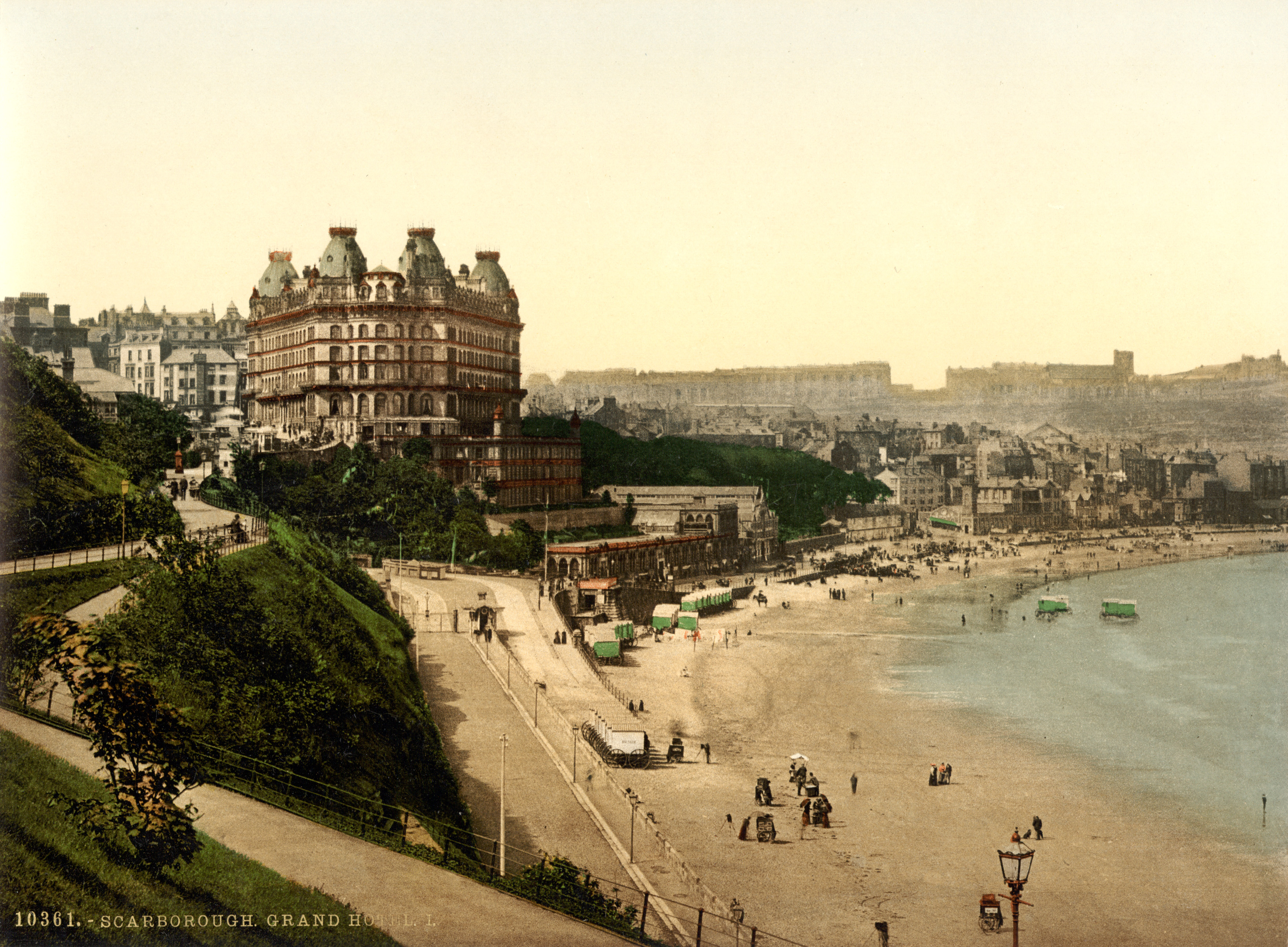
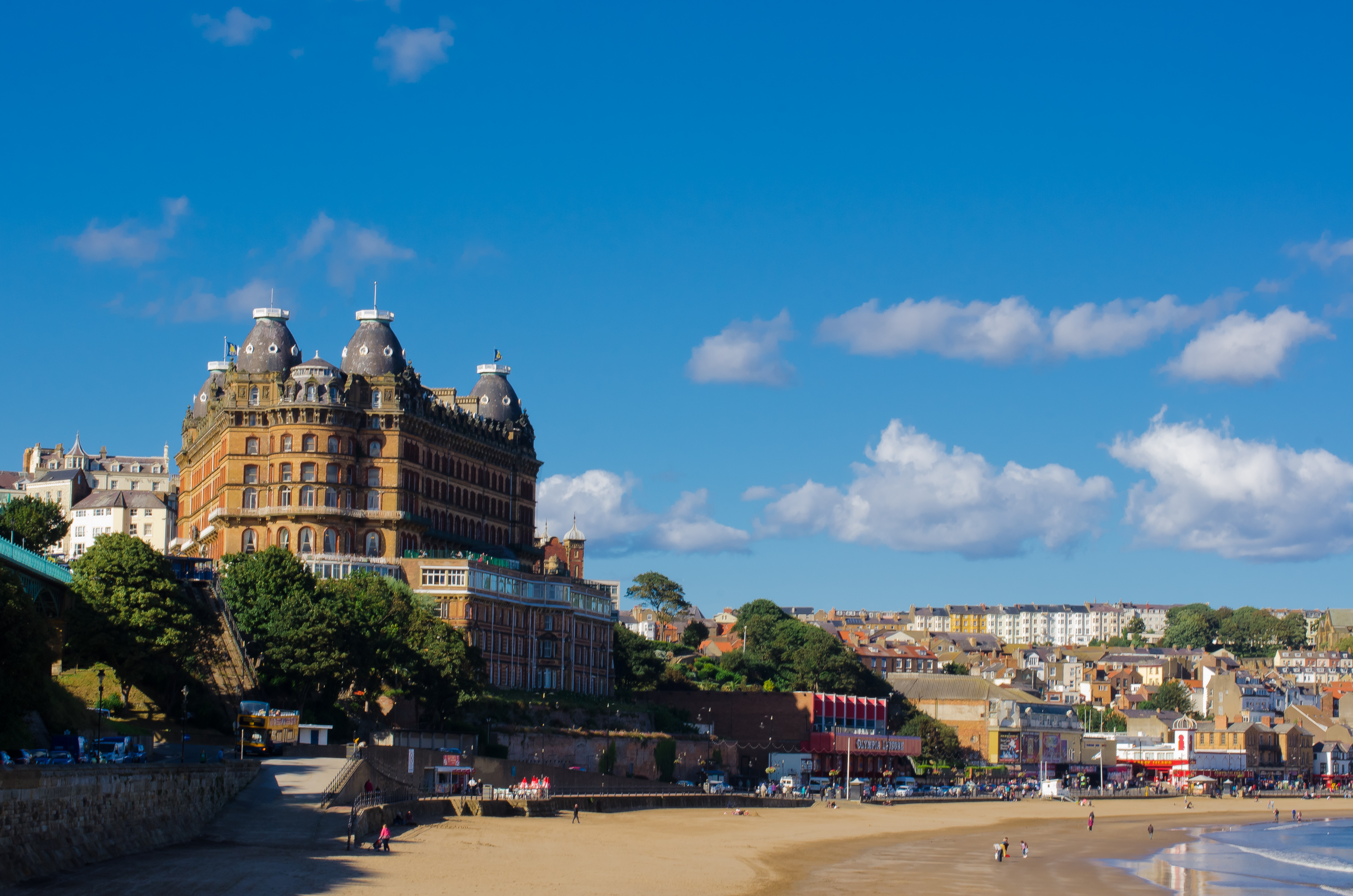
Photochrom of Scarborough in the 1890s and a photo in 2012

Scarborough and its castle changed hands seven times between Royalists and Parliamentarians during the English Civil War of the 1640s, enduring two lengthy and violent sieges. Following the civil war, much of the town lay in ruins.

In 1626, Mrs Thomasin Farrer discovered a stream of acidic water running from one of the cliffs to the south of the town. This gave birth to Scarborough Spa, and Dr Robert Wittie's book about the spa waters published in 1660 attracted a flood of visitors to the town. Scarborough Spa became Britain's first seaside resort, though the first rolling bathing machines were not reported on the sands until 1735. It was a popular getaway destination for the wealthy of London, such as the bookseller Andrew Millar and his family. Their son Andrew junior died there in 1750.

The coming of the Scarborough–York railway in 1845 increased the tide of visitors. Scarborough railway station claims a record for the world's longest platform seat. From the 1880s until the First World War, Scarborough was one of the regular destinations for The Bass Excursions, when fifteen trains would take between 8,000 and 9,000 employees of Bass's Burton brewery on an annual trip to the seaside.

=== Maritime events ===
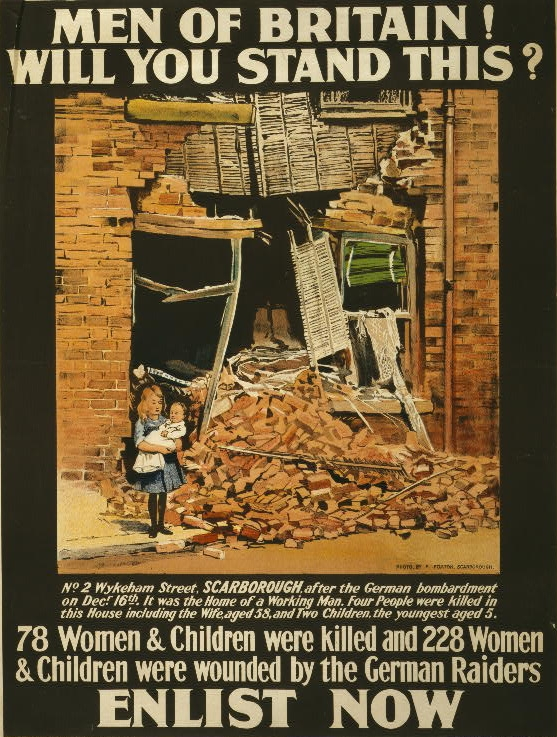
First World War recruitment poster depicting the effects of the German bombardment of Scarborough in 1914

During the First World War, the town was bombarded by German warships of the High Seas Fleet, an act which shocked the British (see Raid on Scarborough, Hartlepool and Whitby). Scarborough Pier Lighthouse, built in 1806, was damaged in the attack. A U-boat assault on the town, on 25 September 1916 saw three people killed and a further five injured. Eleven of Scarborough's trawler fleet were sunk at sea in another U-boat attack, on 4 September 1917.

In 1929, the steam drifter Ascendent caught a 560 lb (250 kg) tunny (Atlantic bluefin tuna) and a Scarborough showman awarded the crew 50 shillings so he could exhibit it as a tourist attraction. Big-game tunny fishing off Scarborough effectively started in 1930 when Lorenzo "Lawrie" Mitchell–Henry, landed a tunny caught on rod and line weighing 560 lb (250 kg). A gentlemen's club, the British Tunny Club, was founded in 1933 and set up its headquarters in the town at the place which is now a restaurant with the same name. Scarborough became a resort for high society. A women's world tuna challenge cup was held for many years.

Colonel (and, later, Sir) Edward Peel landed a world-record tunny of 798 lb (362 kg), capturing the record by 40 lb (18.1 kg) from one caught off Nova Scotia by American champion Zane Grey. The British record which still stands is for a fish weighing 851 lb (386 kg) caught off Scarborough in 1933 by Laurie Mitchell-Henry.

On 5 June 1993, Scarborough made international headlines when a landslip caused part of the Holbeck Hall Hotel, along with its gardens, to fall into the sea. Although the slip was shored up with rocks and the land has long since grassed over, evidence of the cliff's collapse remains clearly visible from The Esplanade, near Shuttleworth Gardens.

Scarborough has been affiliated with a number of Royal Navy vessels, including HMS Apollo, HMS Fearless and HMS Duncan.

== Landmarks ==
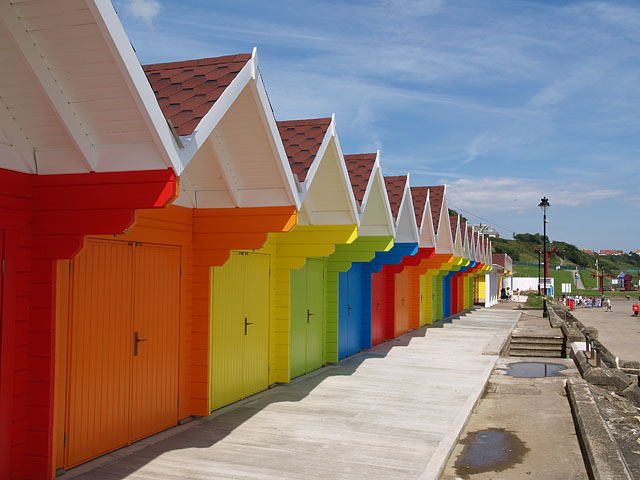
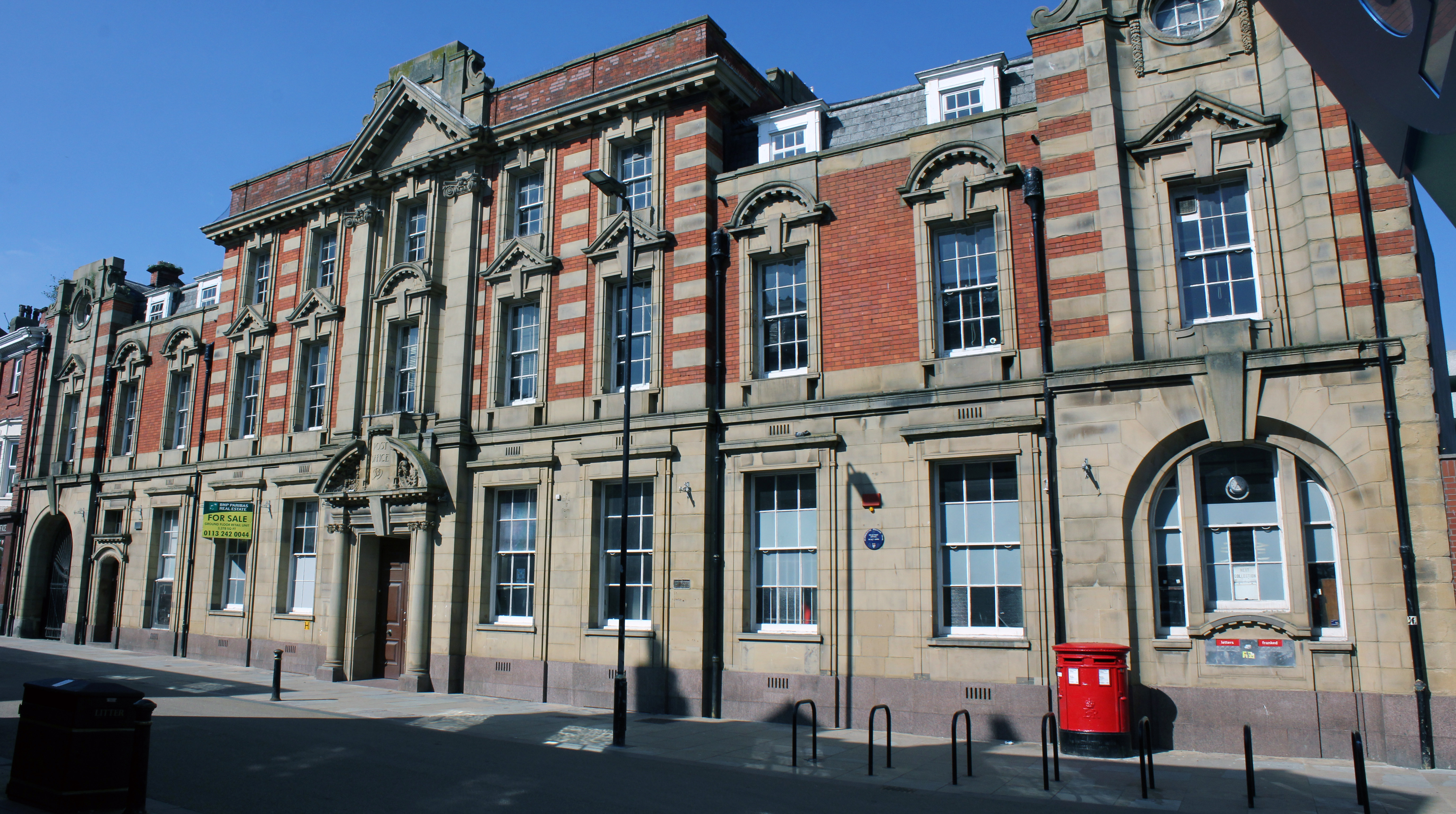
St Martin-on-the-Hill, beach huts on the North Bay, the "Belle" at the Pier Lighthouse, the Cliff Bridge and the town's post office

The town has an Anglican church, St Martin-on-the-Hill, built in 1862–63 as the parish church of South Cliff.It contains works by Dante Gabriel Rossetti, William Morris, Edward Burne-Jones and Ford Madox Brown. A young Malton architect, John Gibson, designed the Crown Spa Hotel, Scarborough's first purpose-built hotel. Notable Georgian structures include the Rotunda Museum, Cliff Bridge and Scarborough Pier Lighthouse. Victorian buildings include the Classical Public Library and Market Hall, the Town Hall, Scarborough Spa, the Art Gallery, the South Cliff Methodist Church, and Scarborough railway station. The architecture of Scarborough generally consists of small, low, orange pantile-roofed buildings in the historic old town, and larger Classical and late Victorian buildings reflecting the time during the 19th century as it expanded away from its historic centre into a coastal spa resort.

Grave of Anne Brontë in St Mary's churchyard

A notable landmark in the town is the Grand Hotel on St Nicholas Cliff. Designed by Cuthbert Brodrick of Hull, it was completed in 1867; at the time of its opening, it was the largest hotel and the largest brick structure in Europe. It uses local yellow brickwork with red detailing and is based around a theme of time: four towers represent the seasons, 12 floors the months, 52 chimneys the weeks and the original 365 bedrooms represented the days of the year. A blue plaque outside the hotel marks where the novelist Anne Brontë died in 1849. She was buried in the graveyard of St Mary's Church by the castle.

An amount of 20th century architecture exists within the main shopping district and in the form of surrounding suburbs. Buildings from this century include the Futurist Theatre (1914), Stephen Joseph Theatre, Brunswick Shopping Centre (1990), and GCHQ Scarborough, a satellite station on the outskirts of the town.

== Geography ==
=== North Bay ===
The North Bay

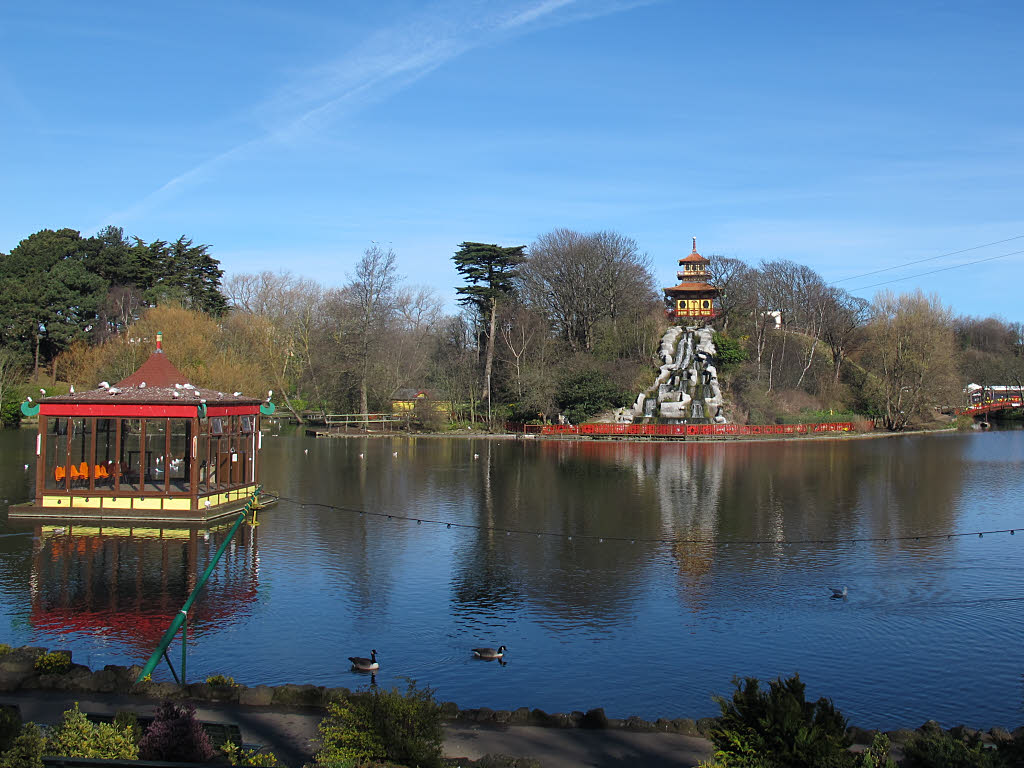
Peasholm Park

The North Bay has traditionally been the more peaceful end of the resort and is home to Peasholm Park which in June 2007, was restored to its Japanese-themed glory, complete with reconstructed pagoda, a new boat house was added in 2018. For many years a mock maritime battle (based on the Battle of the River Plate) has been regularly re-enacted on the boating lake with large model boats and fireworks throughout the summer holiday season.

Northstead Manor Gardens include the North Bay Railway and three other attractions: a water chute, a boating lake with boats for hire during the summer season and the open-air theatre. The water chute is now grade II listed and is one of the oldest surviving water chutes in Britain, with the ride today being the same as when it was opened in the 1930s. The North Bay Railway is a miniature railway running from near Peasholm Park, through Northstead Manor Gardens to the Sea Life Centre at Scalby Mills. The North Bay Railway has what is believed to be the oldest operational diesel-hydraulic locomotive in the world. Neptune was built in 1931 by Hudswell Clarke of Leeds and is appropriately numbered 1931.

=== Castle on the scar ===
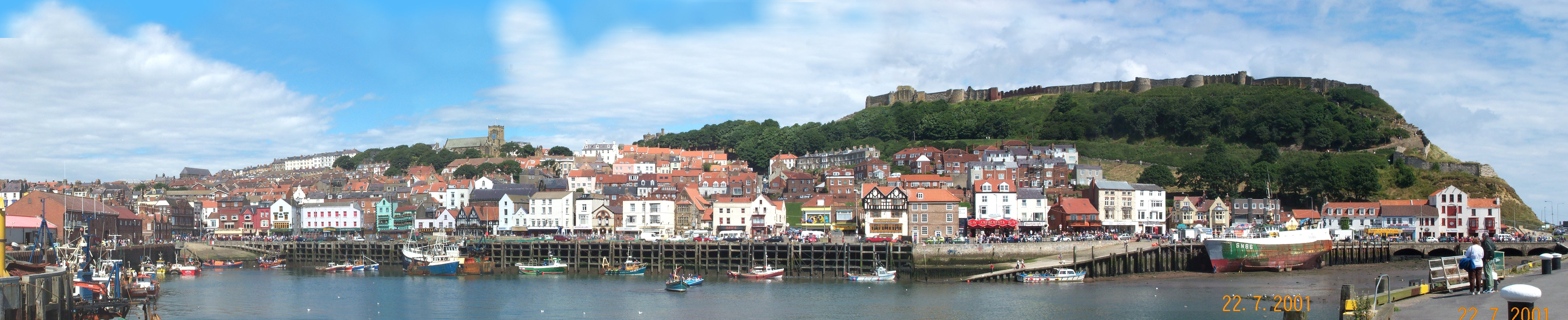
The promontory with its castle, viewed from the south

The most striking feature of the town's geography is the high rocky promontory pointing eastward into the North Sea with Scarborough Castle on the top. The castle was bombarded by the German warships SMS Derfflinger and SMS Von der Tann in the First World War.

The promontory divides the seafront into two bays, north and south. The two bays are linked by Marine Drive, an extensive Victorian promenade, built around the base of the headland. Both bays have popular sandy beaches and numerous rock-pools at low tide.

=== South Bay ===
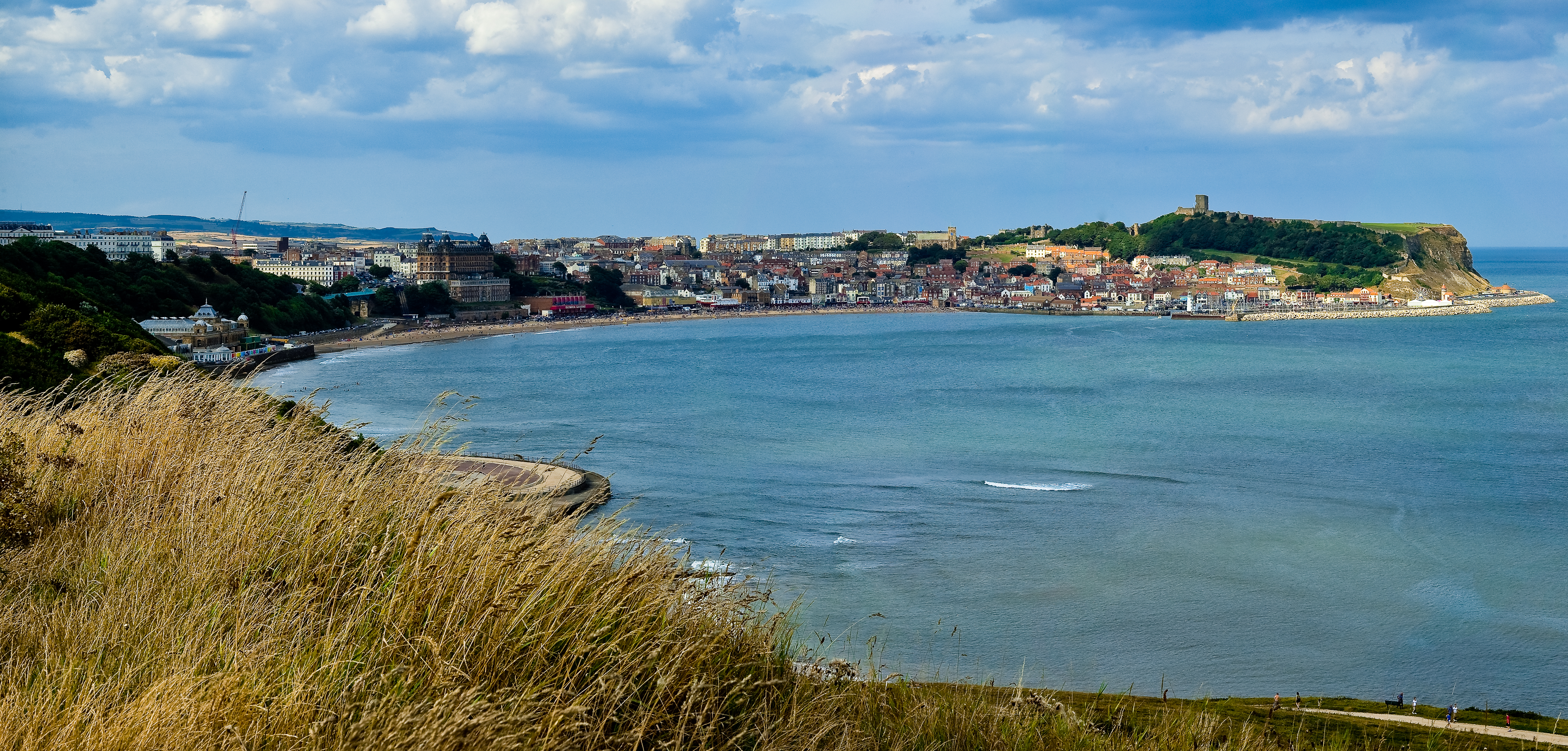
Scarborough's South Bay from Sea Cliff Road

The South Bay was the site of the original medieval settlement and harbour, which form the old town. This remains the main tourist area, with a sandy beach, cafés, amusements, arcades, theatres and entertainment facilities. The modern commercial town centre has migrated 440 yd (400 m) north-west of the harbour area and 100 ft (30 m) above it and contains the transport hubs, main services, shopping and nightlife. The harbour has undergone major regeneration including the new Albert Strange Pontoons, a more pedestrian-friendly promenade, street lighting and seating.

The town was badly damaged in a 98 plane bombing raid by the Luftwaffe during the Second World War, on 18 March 1941. Twenty eight civilians were killed and hundreds were injured and over 1,400 buildings were damaged.

The South Cliff Promenade above the Spa and South Cliff Gardens has wide views of the South Bay and old town. Its splendid Regency and Victorian terraces are still intact, with a mix of quality hotels and flats. The ITV television drama The Royal and its recent spin-off series, The Royal Today were both filmed in the area. The South Bay has the largest illuminated 'star disk' anywhere in the UK. It is 85 ft (26 m) across and fitted with subterranean lights representing the 42 brightest stars and major constellations that can be seen from Scarborough in the northern skies.

=== Mere and mount ===
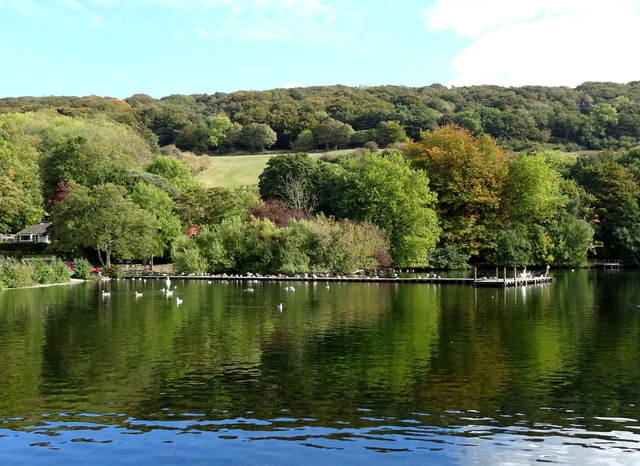
Scarborough Mere with Oliver's Mount in the background

To the south-west of the town, beside the York to Scarborough railway line, is an ornamental lake known as Scarborough Mere. In the 20th century the Mere was a popular park, with rowing boats, canoes and a miniature pirate ship – the Hispaniola – on which passengers were taken to 'Treasure Island' to dig for doubloons. Since the late 1990s the Mere has been redesigned as a natural space for picnics, fishing and walkers. In 2012 a new snack bar was built alongside the Mere. The lake is now part of the Oliver's Mount Country Park and the Hispaniola now sails out of Scarborough harbour during the summer season.

Surrounding the River Derwent as it flows into the sea are high hills with tall, dense grasses and fertile soil, due to the stream 'Sea Cut' leading from the River Derwent to the estuary at the North Sea.

=== Nearby places ===
Place	Distance	Direction	Relation
London	192 miles (309 km)	South	Capital city
Northallerton	42 miles (68 km)	North-west	County town
Middlesbrough	39 miles (63 km)	North-west	Most populated place in North Yorkshire
Kingston upon Hull	37 miles (60 km)	South	Nearby city
York	35 miles (56 km)	South-west	Historic county town

== Climate ==
The climate is temperate with mild summers and cool, windy, winters. The hottest months of the year are July and August, with temperatures reaching an average high of 19 °C and falling to 12 °C at night. The average daytime highs in January are 7 °C, falling to 2 °C at night. The station's elevation of 110 m (360 ft) is far above sea level compared to the immediate coastline, where the climate is likely slightly milder year round.

Climate data for Scarborough, North Yorkshire Average maximum and minimum temperatures, and average rainfall recorded between 1991 and 2020 by the Met Office.
Month	Jan	Feb	Mar	Apr	May	Jun	Jul	Aug	Sep	Oct	Nov	Dec	Year
Record high °C (°F)	15.5 (59.9)	17.2 (63.0)	19.5 (67.1)	24.8 (76.6)	25.2 (77.4)	29.5 (85.1)	35.8 (96.4)	31.4 (88.5)	27.6 (81.7)	26.8 (80.2)	17.3 (63.1)	15.2 (59.4)	35.8 (96.4)
Mean daily maximum °C (°F)	6.7 (44.1)	7.1 (44.8)	9.1 (48.4)	11.4 (52.5)	14.0 (57.2)	16.9 (62.4)	19.2 (66.6)	19.1 (66.4)	16.7 (62.1)	13.1 (55.6)	9.5 (49.1)	7.0 (44.6)	12.5 (54.5)
Daily mean °C (°F)	4.3 (39.7)	4.6 (40.3)	6.1 (43.0)	8.2 (46.8)	10.7 (51.3)	13.5 (56.3)	15.7 (60.3)	15.7 (60.3)	13.6 (56.5)	10.5 (50.9)	7.1 (44.8)	4.7 (40.5)	9.6 (49.3)
Mean daily minimum °C (°F)	2.0 (35.6)	2.0 (35.6)	3.1 (37.6)	5.0 (41.0)	7.4 (45.3)	10.1 (50.2)	12.2 (54.0)	12.4 (54.3)	10.5 (50.9)	7.9 (46.2)	4.6 (40.3)	2.4 (36.3)	6.7 (44.1)
Record low °C (°F)	−6.5 (20.3)	−6.0 (21.2)	−5.4 (22.3)	−2.6 (27.3)	−0.7 (30.7)	3.9 (39.0)	5.8 (42.4)	6.1 (43.0)	2.9 (37.2)	−2.3 (27.9)	−5.0 (23.0)	−10.5 (13.1)	−10.5 (13.1)
Average precipitation mm (inches)	56.9 (2.24)	48.8 (1.92)	45.5 (1.79)	50.4 (1.98)	45.2 (1.78)	65.5 (2.58)	56.6 (2.23)	69.5 (2.74)	57.3 (2.26)	68.4 (2.69)	73.4 (2.89)	68.0 (2.68)	705.5 (27.78)
Average precipitation days (≥ 1.0 mm)	12.1	11.5	9.5	9.1	8.3	9.9	10.0	10.2	9.4	11.6	13.0	12.8	127.3
Mean monthly sunshine hours	56.3	83.5	117.9	164.8	213.8	189.3	201.3	188.5	142.5	101.9	64.9	54.2	1,578.8
Source 1: Met Office
Source 2: Starlings Roost Weather

== Economy ==
Scarborough Marina and Harbour with the Castle in view

Scarborough's fishing industry is still active, though much reduced in size. The working harbour is home to a fish market including a shop and wooden stalls where fresh, locally-caught seafood can be purchased by the public. A seaweed farm has been in operation since 2018, with a licence to go into a large-scale commercial operation from 2019. SeaGrown have an intent to move into the bioplastics market.

The tourism trade continues to be a major part of the local economy with Scarborough being the second most-visited destination in England by British holidaymakers. While weekend and mid-week-break trade are tending to replace the traditional week-long family holiday, the beaches and attractions are busy throughout summer, a contrast to quieter winter months.

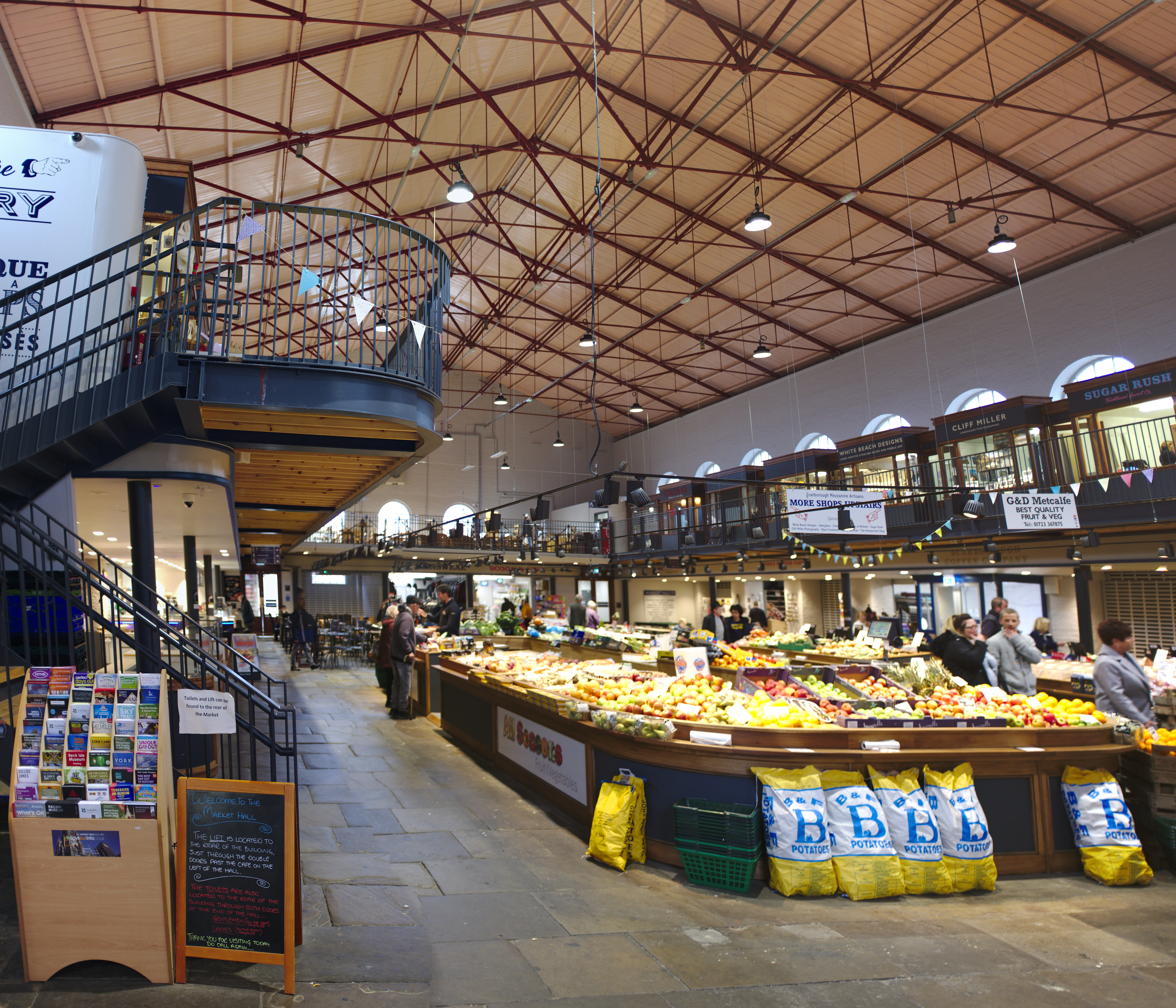
The Market Hall

Scarborough's town centre has a multiple boutique shops (such as on Bar Street and St Thomas Street) with a main pedestrianised shopping street and a shopping centre with many major chains. The town also has an indoor market hall with a large range of antique shops and independent traders in its vaults, and a smaller market on the South Bay. Boyes (based on the town's outskirts in Eastfield) is a discount department store chain which has over 70 stores across principally the north of England and in the English East Midlands with a flagship shop on Queen Street.

=== Industries ===
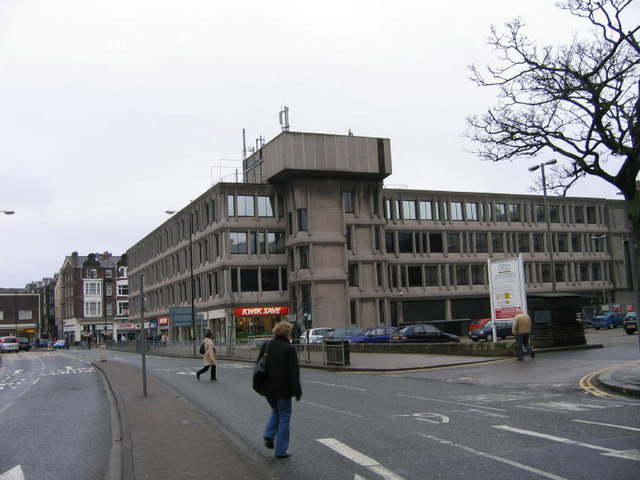
Pavilion House

Manufacturers based in Scarborough include the Plaxton Company (a division of Alexander Dennis) which has been building coaches and buses since 1907. Sirius Minerals, which is developing a potash mine near Whitby, has its headquarters in Scarborough. McCain Foods has a factory in the town for over 50 years, and sponsored the previous football stadium. Scarborough power station supplied electricity to the town and the surrounding area from 1893 to 1958. It was owned and operated by the Scarborough Electric Supply Company Limited from 1893 to 1925, then by Scarborough Corporation until the nationalisation of utilities by the Attlee ministry in 1948. The coal-fired power station had an electricity generating capacity of 7 MW prior to its closure in October 1958.

=== Creative industries ===
Creative industries have been cited as playing a vital role in the regeneration of Scarborough; a report in 2005 estimated that they comprised 19% of the town's economy. They were also a major focus of Scarborough's winning entry in the 2008 Enterprising Britain competition, with representatives from Woodend Creative Workspace and Scarborough-based Electric Angel Design representing the town in the Yorkshire and Humber regional heats. In the finals in London on 16 October 2008, Scarborough won the title of Britain's Most Enterprising Town, and went on to win the European Enterprise Awards as Great Britain's representative, on 13 May 2009 in Prague.

In 2010 the town was the winner of the 'Great Town Award', as nominated by the Academy of Urbanism, beating Chester and Cambridge respectively.

=== Healthcare ===
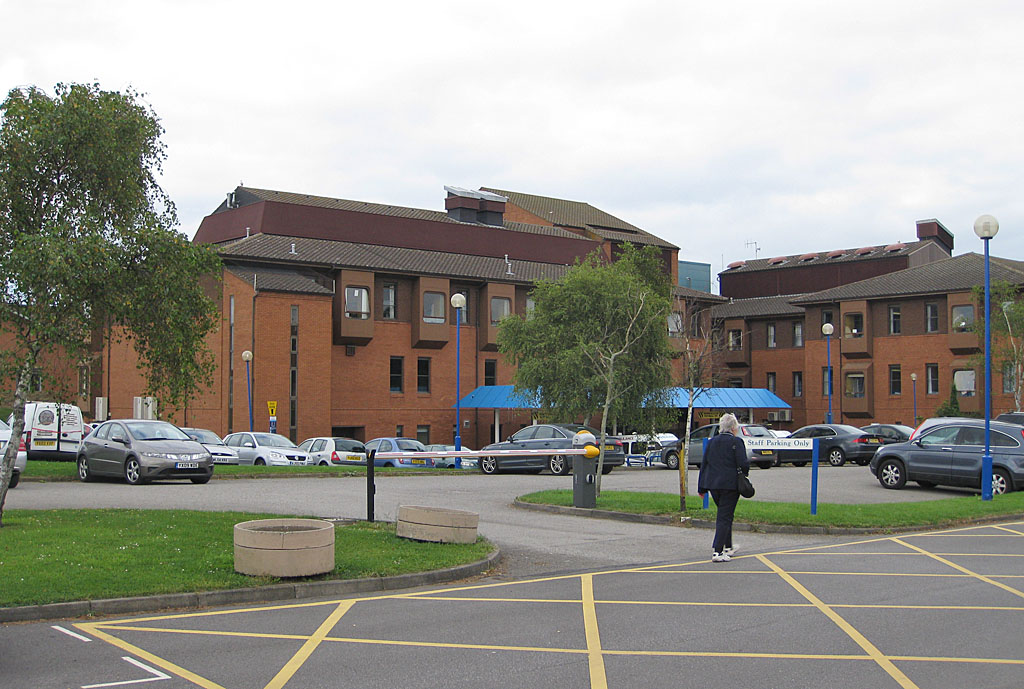
Scarborough Hospital

Scarborough Hospital is the local district general NHS hospital. It is run by the York and Scarborough Teaching Hospitals NHS Foundation Trust, and is the largest employer in the area employing over 2,400 staff. A review of acute healthcare in the town in 2019 identified problems recruiting staff at the hospital but promised to maintain the site's Accident and Emergency department.

A new £47 million Emergency Department is under construction and was due to open in early 2024.

== Governance ==
In 1835 Scarborough became a municipal borough. Until 1890 the district also contained the civil parish of Falsgrave; in 1890 Falsgrave was dissolved and absorbed into the parish of Scarborough. On 1 April 1974 the district and parish were abolished to form the non-metropolitan district of Scarborough. No successor parish was formed so it became unparished. On 1 April 1985 the parish of Osgodby was formed from Cayton and part of the unparished area. On 1 April 1999 Eastfield was formed from part of the unparished area. On 1 April 2023 Scarborough district was abolished and became part of North Yorkshire unitary authority area, a charter trustees was formed. On 1 April 2025 the remaining part was parished as Scarborough with the charter trustees moved to the town council, parts of the unparished area also went to the parishes of Eastfield, "Newby and Scalby" and Osgodby, with a town council, elected on 1 May 2025 and the town council met for the first time on 15 May.

== Demography ==
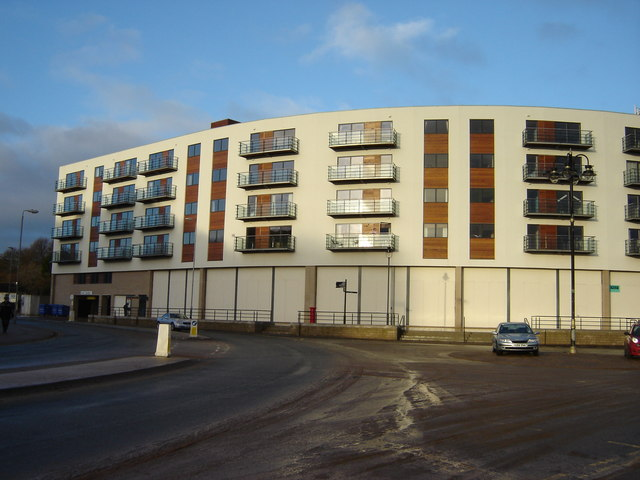
The Sands Development

The town's built-up area population was 61,749 in the 2011 UK census, most of the Newby and Scalby civil parish population was included in the area. Its unparished area had a larger population than the rest of parished areas of the wider Borough of Scarborough, including the coastal towns of Whitby and Filey.

The borough as a whole had a population of around 108,000; during the peak season, tourism can double these figures. 27.5% of the population were aged over 60, compared with an average of 20.9% nationally. Only 21.9% of the population were aged between 20 and 39, compared to 28.1% nationally.

== Transport ==
=== Road ===
Scarborough has four major roads serving the town; these also link it to other major towns and cities:

- A64 – starting at the town centre, it links the town with Leeds (through York, the A19 and the A1(M)) and is the main tourist route to the town. The road is dual carriageway standard for some of its route, between the A1(M) and Malton.
- A165 – coastal route south to Hull, through Bridlington. In 2008, an Osgodby bypass was created re-routing the assigned name.
- A170 – starts at Scarborough and heads west to Pickering, the A19 and Thirsk.
- A171 – a coastal route starting in the town and heads north through Whitby. It then passes through the North York Moors and Guisborough, terminating in Middlesbrough.

=== Bus ===
Scarborough has 25 main bus routes, operated by East Yorkshire, Arriva North East, Shoreline Suncruisers and Coastliner. These link the town centre with its suburbs, the North York Moors and local towns and cities such as Bridlington, Whitby, York, Hull, Middlesbrough and Leeds.

The town is also served by two Park and Ride services, with locations on the A64 and A165. Buses run from each terminus to the town centre and South Bay at least every 12 minutes, seven days a week, with stopping points around the town centre. Buses from the Filey Road terminus on the A165 also stop at the University of Hull's Scarborough campus. Open top tourist buses, branded Beachcomber, also run along the sea front and Marine Drive, linking the South and North bays.

=== Railway ===
Scarborough railway station

Scarborough railway station is the eastern terminus of the York-Scarborough line, part of the North TransPennine route. TransPennine Express operates an hourly service to York, with alternate trains continuing on to Leeds and Manchester Piccadilly. Northern Trains operates a service to Hull on the Yorkshire Coast Line. It has the longest station seat in the world at 152 yards (139 m) in length.

The town used to be connected to Whitby, via the Scarborough and Whitby Railway along the Yorkshire coast; this closed in 1965, as part of the Beeching cuts.

Seamer railway station, in the suburb of Crossgates, is a stop on both lines.

There are two operational funicular railways, both situated on South Bay. An additional funicular exists on the South Bay but no longer operates and two funiculars on North Bay have been demolished.

An electric tramway service with six routes was provided by the Scarborough Tramways Company between 1904 and 1931, after which it was bought by the council and replaced by omnibuses.

=== Ferries ===
Although the town has no ferry services, there are transport links to Hull, from where frequent services operate to northern Europe.

== Culture ==
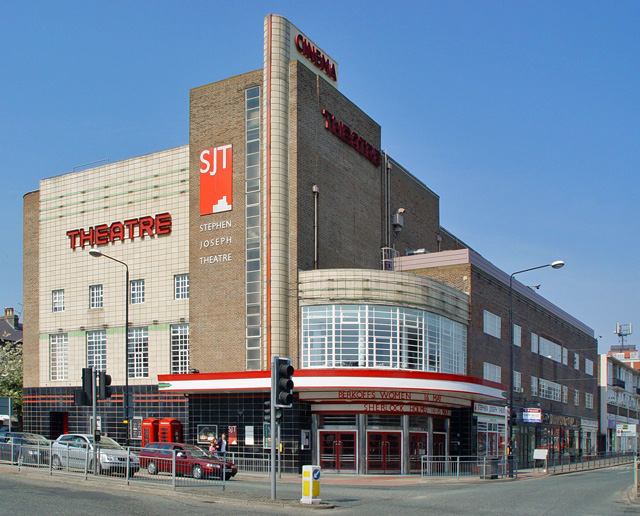
Stephen Joseph Theatre

=== Media ===
Scarborough receives its news and television programmes from BBC Yorkshire and ITV Yorkshire via the Oliver's Mount TV transmitter.

Local radio stations are BBC Radio York on 95.5 FM and community radio stations Coast & County Radio which broadcasts to Scarborough on 97.4 FM. and Radio Scarborough which broadcasts on 107.6 FM.

Scarborough was home to local commercial radio station, Yorkshire Coast Radio, in August 2018 the station achieved the highest weekly reach of any radio station in England with a 53% weekly reach. However, in August 2020 YCR ceased broadcasting as it was bought out by Bauer Media and rebranded as Greatest Hits Radio Yorkshire Coast. The radio DJs and staff were made redundant. Some of the YCR team have since launched a new local station for the area, This is The Coast, broadcasting online and on DAB.

The first newspaper recorded as printed in the town was published in 1876. The Scarborough News is the weekly newspaper for the town and local district. It was first published on 31 May 2012, as a relaunch of the former daily publication, The Scarborough Evening News.

=== Live theatre ===
Dramatist Alan Ayckbourn has lived in Scarborough for many years. He has produced seventy-five plays in Scarborough and was formerly the artistic director of the Stephen Joseph Theatre, where almost all his plays receive their first performance. Chris Monks took over as artistic director in 2009, followed by Paul Robinson in 2016.

The Open Air Theatre, at the Northstead Manor Gardens, originally had a seating capacity of 6,500 (now 8,000). The Lord Mayor of London opened the theatre in 1932 and audiences flocked to see Merrie England, the opera was the first work to be staged at the outdoor venue. Productions were performed during the summer seasons until musicals ceased in 1968 after West Side Story, apart from a YMCA production in 1982. In 1997, the dressing rooms and stage set building on the island were demolished and the seating removed. The last concert to be held at the open-air theatre before it closed in 1986 was James Last and his orchestra. The venue was restored and officially opened by The Queen on 20 May 2010. The venue is now a prime concert locality. Many British and international acts perform there.

The YMCA Theatre is an amateur theatre seating 290. It hosts some 35 productions a year, including musicals and dance shows.

=== Cinema ===
As of 2019, Scarborough has two cinemas, the Hollywood Plaza and the Stephen Joseph Theatre.

A third, the Futurist Theatre, closed in January 2014 when the operator's lease expired. The building was later demolished. A new multi-complex cinema development is planned for the town at The Brunswick Centre site, but full approval is yet to be confirmed.

=== Creative arts and museums ===
The Rotunda Museum

Scarborough has a long-established museum and visual-arts facilities. Wood End, the former home of The Sitwells, was converted into the Woodend museum, (Note: The museum is listed as being Wood End, but is shown on the same page as Woodend since its revamp.) a creative centre including workspace for artists and the digital cluster, plus an exhibition space. The Rotunda Museum underwent a multimillion-pound redevelopment to become a national centre for geology. 2006 also saw the formation of a creative industries network called 'Creative Coast' comprising artists, designers, writers and other creatives.

The Rotunda Museum nowadays forms part of the Scarborough Museums Trust. The other part is the Scarborough Art Gallery, which houses the collections of fine arts since 1947. This gallery is based in a Grade II* Italianate villa, Crescent Villa, that was built in the 1840s.

For a short time, a walkthrough attraction called 'Millennium' operated at the end of Sandside near the harbour. Created by local amusement owner Henry Marshall in a former sail loft, the attraction depicted 1000 years of Scarborough's history. It opened in 1993 but closed in 2002.

Scarborough has a considerable graffiti culture, with as many as 20 artists currently active. There are two areas where graffiti art is legal in Scarborough: Sainsbury's basketball courts / all-weather pitch and Falsgrave Park wall. Both have seen many collaborations and murals.

The Lord Louis Mountbatten Memorial Loyal Orange Lodge is based in the town. They were founded in 1980 in Mountbatten's memory. They are a lodge within the Orange Order. They take part in Orange walks, practice their religion and hold regular meetings.

=== Music ===
The Grade II listed Scarborough Spa complex is home to the Scarborough Spa Orchestra, the last remaining seaside orchestra in the UK.

The globally successful pop / soul singer Robert Palmer spent his teenage years in Scarborough, attending Scarborough High School for Boys.

During the late 1980s and the first half of the 1990s, Scarborough band Little Angels were one of the best known hard rock bands in the UK. Their third and final studio album, Jam, peaked at No. 1 on the UK charts in early 1993. Chris Helme of The Seahorses, Eliza Carthy, Ashley Hicklin, Oliver Knight and Sophia Wardman, also attended schools and colleges in the area.

Acoustic Gathering, a free one-day music festival, has been held annually in Peasholm Park, since September 2005. This features over 20 bands and singer/songwriters from all parts of the UK including a number of local groups and musicians, all performing from the bandstand in the centre of the lake. Finnish idols winner Koop Arponen filmed his video for the song, "Young and Foolish" in the town, and One Night Only shot the video for their hit "Just For Tonight", mostly along Scarborough foreshore.

Scarborough is home to one of the longest running jazz clubs in the country, established in 1974: Scarborough Jazz regularly plays host to tours by nationally known musicians as well as supporting regional and local music. Scarborough Jazz Festival was established in 2003 and takes place annually at The Spa.

Active Minds, the long-standing Hardcore Punk band from Scarborough have been performing globally for over forty years

=== Location for filming ===
The films Little Voice, Possession, and A Chorus of Disapproval were filmed on location in Scarborough and surrounds. Also shot in the Scarborough (borough) & North York Moors are over 90 films, documentaries and various TV programmes. Films include An Inspector Calls, Miranda, Dancing Queen, Beltenebros, The Brides in the Bath, Screwed, The Damned United, Scarborough, A is for Acid and Saint Maud. Television series filmed in the area include Heartbeat, its spin-off series The Royal, CBBC's All at Sea, BBC1's Rosie, BBC1's Remember Me, German TV crime drama The Search, scenes from the second series of Five Days and an episode each of Barbara, Coronation Street & Last of the Summer Wine. The 2015 series of The Syndicate starring Anthony Andrews, Melanie Hill and Lenny Henry also filmed scenes in Scarborough. A sitcom named Scarborough was filmed in the town in 2019. The show being the brainchild of Derren Litten the creator of ITV hit Benidorm was based on a group of friends who meet up for Karaoke nights in the town. The show first aired on BBC1 on 6 September 2019 in a primetime Friday night slot (9:30 pm) the day before transmission the first two episodes were given a 'world premiere' to an audience at the Stephen Joseph Theatre. The third series of reality TV show Celebs on the Farm, was filmed on location in the outskirts of the town, in 2021.

== Notable events ==
- Sci-Fi Scarborough – Since 2014, Scarborough has hosted its own "Unconventional Convention" at The Spa Complex. It is usually held in March or April each year. Sci-Fi Scarborough is a mix of Sci-Fi Convention, Comicon, and gaming convention.
- Seafest – Seafest is an annual festival which takes place at West Pier and around the harbour area in July. It celebrates the region's fishing history and hosts a large gathering of folk singers, shantymen and musicians, drawing artists from all over the U.K. and from other nations including Senegal, Sicily, Canada, Éire, Luxembourg, Germany, the Netherlands, Brittany, and the USA. In addition, there are children's entertainments and a 'Sea Fish Cookery' marquee where visiting chefs demonstrate seafood preparation. The event celebrated its 20th anniversary in 2018.
- Heroes Welcome UK – Heroes Welcome is a movement which originated in and is administered from Scarborough to encourage communities to demonstrate support to members of the armed forces. In 2008, a hand-drawn poster stating "Heroes Welcome Here" was displayed in a Scarborough seafront restaurant. From this gesture has evolved a national network of towns, cities and counties. Businesses are invited to display a sticker extending a special welcome to service personnel. Member communities are located as far north as the Oykel Valley in the Scottish Highlands to as far south as the Falkland Islands. The Rock of Gibraltar joined in February 2013. The Heroes Welcome event in Scarborough has become a regular part of Armed Forces Day and celebrated its 10th anniversary in 2018.
- Armed Forces Day – Since 2009, Scarborough has hosted the armed forces day event on the last Saturday of June which includes a display of army vehicles and weapons along the South Bay. The event also includes air displays from various aircraft and ends with a parade along the road. In 2020, Scarborough was due to be the host town, for the national Armed Forces Day event, which was subsequently postponed due to the COVID-19 pandemic. The town successfully hosted the occasion on 25 June 2022.
- Tour de Yorkshire – Scarborough is the only town to have hosted either a start or finish event in every edition of the Tour de Yorkshire.
- Scarborough Cricket Festival – An annual cricket festival at North Marine Road.
- Big Ideas By The Sea. In its third year, this festival is organised by a local historian and artist. It includes a wide range events across venues relating to archaeology (most famously the 'Big Dig'), music, science, visual arts and literature.

== Podcasts ==
Scarborough is home to some notable podcasts.

Two Guys, What's Up is a weekly comedy podcast covering the paranormal and funny things found on the internet. They won the 'Best Comedy Podcast' award at The Podcast Tonight Award.

== Twinning ==
Scarborough is twinned with:

- Cahir, Ireland

Scarborough is affiliated with HMS Duncan.

== Education ==
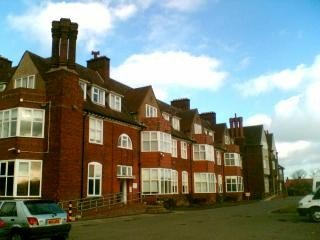
University of Hull Scarborough Campus

In 2019/20, there were 22 primary schools, five secondary schools, and three special schools with addresses in Scarborough. The four main state secondary schools are Graham School, George Pindar School, Scalby School, and St Augustine's Catholic School. In September 2016, Scarborough University Technical College (UTC) opened for 14 to 18 year olds. The most recent secondary school closure was Raincliffe School, which in 2012 merged with Graham School.

There is one private school in Scarborough, Scarborough College, originally established in 1898. In 2006, Scarborough College adopted the International Baccalaureate at the sixth form level, in place of A Levels. In 2012, it merged with another local private school, Bramcote School.

Further education is provided by Scarborough Sixth Form College and Scarborough TEC. CU Scarborough, owned by Coventry University, offers higher education in the town.

Scarborough International School of English, established in 1968 is accredited by the British Council and members of English UK and English UK North. The school offers English Language courses to students from around the world. There is also a private international language school called Anglolang, established in 1985, which teaches the English language to overseas students, companies, educational institutions, organised groups and individuals.

Education in Scarborough has been notable for its commitment to the digital economy, particularly with the formation of the University of Hull's School of Arts and New Media, at the Scarborough Campus in 2006. This made Scarborough one of the UK mainland's first wireless campuses.

== Sport ==
The Scarborough Amateur Rowing Club was founded in May 1869, and is the oldest surviving rowing club on the north-east coast. For more than 100 years, sea rowing has taken place on the Yorkshire coast between the Tees and the Humber. Beginning with friendly rivalry between the fishermen and the jet miners from Blyth (the German Ocean Race), the sport has progressed to what it is today. More recent successes for the club include Bob Hewitt, who now competes as a lightweight rower for the national team. In 2006 the club finally won the acclaimed Wilson Cup, until then held by rival clubs in neighbouring town Whitby for over eighty years. Rowing takes place throughout the summer months.

The Blue Riband event for Scarborough Yacht Club, is the annual 210 nautical mile race, from the town, to IJmuiden in the Netherlands. The club is based in the old keepers' accommodation adjoining Scarborough Pier Lighthouse in the harbour.

Scarborough is home to the Oliver's Mount racing circuit. This track is composed of twisty public roads and has played host to domestic motorcycling and rallying events for many years. Noted motorcycle racers who have raced at Oliver's Mount include Barry Sheene, Ron Haslam and Guy Martin. The town was the home of the 2nd RAC Rally in 1952. In March 2019 newly formed motorcycle racing club, Two Four Three Road Racing Association was granted a lease to run road races at the venue, and they restarted road racing at the venue in July 2019 after a year's absence.

Scarborough Cricket Club have won the ECB National Club Cricket Championship at Lord's, on five occasions between 1972 and 1982, a record number of victories. The club also hosts the annual Scarborough Cricket Festival, and Yorkshire play at North Marine Road, in a selection of home fixtures throughout the season. The club has competed in the Yorkshire Premier League North since 2016. The club won the former Yorkshire League on thirteen occasions and seven regional titles, prior to that league's installation.

The former Scarborough Football Club enjoyed a career in the Football League during the 1990s before being relegated to the Conference North in 2006, and to the Northern Premier League the following year. One of its greatest achievements was winning the FA Trophy at Wembley Stadium on three occasions and being runners-up on one. They were also the first club to win automatic promotion to the Football League, when in 1987 they were promoted as champions of the GM Vauxhall Conference. In 2007 a new club, Scarborough Athletic, was formed and they play their home matches at the Flamingo Land Stadium.

Scarborough Hockey Club is a field hockey club that competes in the North Hockey League and the Yorkshire & North East Hockey League.

In 2007, the town hosted the World Thundercat Championships (for inflatable powerboats), and similar events in 2008 and 2015. Scarborough Rugby Union Football Club moved to a new £4-million ground development, on the outskirts of town in January 2009 (Silver Royd), the club is very ambitious and reached the semi-finals of the RFU Intermediate Cup, in 2015. The venue is also home to various sports facilities and partly the home of Scarborough AC (Athletic Club, formerly Harriers), who also utilize the Bramcote Athletics track, opened in September 2023. The nationally achieving Scarborough Gymnastics Academy, has a highly developed specialist facility in the west of the town. The former Scarborough Sports Centre was a past venue for the Slazenger Pro Championships, attracting such stars as Fred Perry, Rod Laver and Pancho Gonzales. Scarborough Bowls Centre, on the site of the former Floral Hall, is utilized for a variety of events throughout the year.

The town has two principal golf courses, North Cliff and South Cliff, plus some smaller ventures. Ganton Golf Club, which has hosted tournaments such as the Ryder Cup and Walker Cup, is situated approximately 8 mi (13 km) to the west of Scarborough.

George Pindar School, which is based at Eastfield, is a Sports Community College, and is home to Scarborough Pirates ARLFC, Scarborough Seahawks Basketball and formerly Scarborough Hockey Club, who are now at Scarborough College. The centre also has a tennis facility. Scarborough Table Tennis Centre is located at Graham School.

A national martial arts organisation, the Empire Martial Arts Association, is based in Scarborough.

The former Tourist Information Centre (now an ice cream parlour) in the South Bay is the finishing point of the White Rose Way, a long-distance walk from Leeds.

Scarborough was the finishing point, for Stage 1 of the inaugural 2015 Tour de Yorkshire, hosted on 1 May, and has hosted a stage finish every year since.

A sports village based in Weaponness Valley, that is now the home stadium of Scarborough Athletic, was opened in July 2017.

Due to frequent low pressure systems in the North Atlantic, Scarborough has also become home to a cold water surfing scene with many surf shops and competitions taking place including the King of The Point, a big wave contest designed to show off the quality of surf the North Yorkshire coast can receive.

== Notable people ==
- Zoe Aldcroft (1996), rugby player for the Red Roses England women's national rugby union team and Gloucester–Hartpury, World Player of the Year in 2021
- Sir Alan Ayckbourn (born 1939), playwright
- Florence Balgarnie (1856–1928), suffragette, speaker, pacifist, feminist, temperance activist
- Frederick Barkham (1905–1992), cricketer
- Anne Brontë (1820–1849), novelist and poet, died at Scarborough and buried in St Mary's churchyard
- Richard Dunn, boxer, British, European and Commonwealth Heavyweight Champion (1975–1976)
- Sir Edward James Harland, 1st Baronet (1831–1895), shipbuilder and politician, co-founder of Harland and Wolff
- Dick Hewitt (1943–2017), Moorthorpe-born footballer
- John Hick (1922–2012), philosopher of religion
- Susan Hill (born 1942), novelist
- Florence Hooton (1912–1988), cellist, born in Scarborough
- Paul Ingle (born 1972), former IBF featherweight champion
- Sir Ben Kingsley (born Snainton, 1943), Oscar-winning actor
- Charles Laughton (1899–1962), actor, screenwriter, film producer and director
- Frederic Leighton, 1st Baron Leighton (1830–1896), painter and sculptor
- James Paul Moody (1887–1912), sixth officer of the ill-fated RMS Titanic
- Allan Morley (1895–1960), cartoonist
- Bill Nicholson (1919–2004), footballer and manager
- Mikey North (born 1986), Coronation Street actor
- Robert Palmer (1949–2003), student at Scarborough High School for Boys, now Graham School
- Jake Pratt (born 1996), actor
- Benjamin Pulleyne, Oxford don and headmaster of Gresham's School
- Sir Ralph Riley FRS (1924–1999), cytogeneticist
- Don Robinson (1934–2025), businessman and former wrestler
- Jimmy Savile (1926–2011), media personality and prolific sex offender; resided in Scarborough and is buried there in an unmarked grave
- Robert de Scardeburgh (died c. 1351), Lord Chief Justice of Ireland
- John Senior (born 1960), survivor of the Lakonia disaster and founder of Heroes Welcome UK
- Paddy Young (born 1991) Comedian known from SNL UK, actor
- Penny and Ella (est. 2005) best buddy’s
- The Sitwells (born late 1800s), artistic, musical and literary family
- William Smith, known as the "father of English geology", lived in Scarborough, where he suggested the design for the Rotunda
- Ryan Swain, presenter, actor and motivational speaker, student at Scarborough TEC
- Dame Penelope Wilton (born 1946), actress
