= Scarborough Town Hall =

Municipal building in Scarborough, North Yorkshire, England

- Gardens to the south elevation of the Town Hall

General information
- Architectural style: Jacobean Revival
- Classification

Listed Building – Grade II
- Designated: 8 June 1973
- Reference no.: 1273023
- Location: Scarborough, North Yorkshire, England
- Coordinates: 54.2818°N 0.3981°W
- Completed: 1844 or 1870
- Opened: 28 July 1903
- Renovated: 1898–1903
- Cost: £2,300
- Renovation cost: £19,500
- Client: John Woodall
- Owner: Scarborough Borough Council

Website
- North Yorks County Council

Scarborough Town Hall, originally St Nicholas House, is a red brick Jacobean Revival mansion in Scarborough, North Yorkshire, England, currently used as a municipal building for the Borough of Scarborough and an events venue. It was built in the 19th century as a home for John Woodall, a prominent local businessman, and then converted and extended for municipal use in 1903. Situated overlooking the South Bay, it is a grade II listed building.

== History ==
The origins of local government in Scarborough date to a charter granted by Henry II in 1163. An ancient town hall based on Sandside, facing the harbour on a site now occupied by the former Bethel Mission Chapel, moved in 1800 to William Newstead's Assembly Rooms on Long Room Street (now St Nicholas Street). This was the Corporation's seat until 1867, when a new town hall and courthouse were opened in Castle Road. By 1898, this too was considered inadequate and the Corporation sought a new town hall site.

The mansion which was to become the town hall was St Nicholas House, which was commissioned by John Woodall – part of a prominent and successful Scarborough family – to replace his previous home, 22 Long Room Street. The date and architect of the construction appears to be contested; research by Scarborough Civic Society suggests it was by Henry Wyatt in 1844, while the listing description from Historic England ascribes it to W B Stewart, 1869–70. It cost approximately £2,300 (equivalent to £237,000 in 2025) at a time when Scarborough's population was 18,377.

In 1898 – by which point the population had grown to 33,776 and needed further resources for administration – John Woodall's son, John W Woodall, whose portrait hangs inside the building's foyer, and who had inherited the property in 1879, put forward and sold St Nicholas House to the Corporation. It paid £33,575 (equivalent to £3,770,000 in 2025) for the building; this price also included other properties on the cliff which have been demolished. The house needed work to make it suitable for use as a town hall, and this was designed by the newly appointed borough engineer and surveyor Harry W Smith in 1898–1903. This involved a new east wing to fit new rooms such as departmental offices and the council chamber. The cost of conversion was about £19,500.

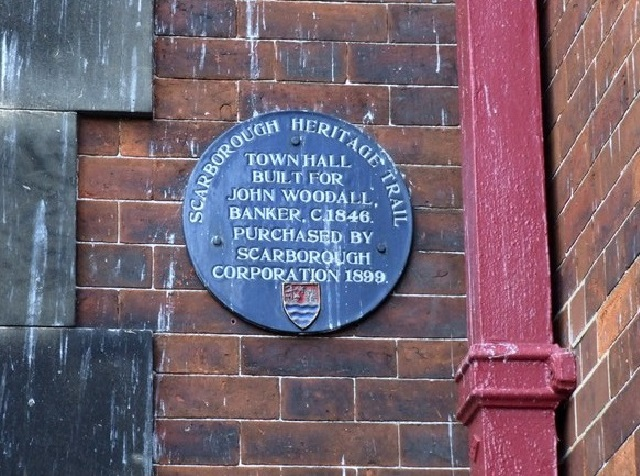
A blue plaque on Scarborough Heritage Trail

An official opening ceremony took place on 28 July 1903, during which Queen Victoria's youngest daughter, Princess Beatrice, formally opened the Town Hall – the ceremonial key used is displayed in a cabinet inside the building – and unveiled a new bronze statue of Victoria by Charles Bell Birch in gardens outside. The memorial statue, which is separately grade II listed, is the only statue of a public figure in Scarborough.

=== Later history ===
Further extensions were made in King Street and St Nicholas Street in 1962–64 in a standard modern office block style. This is used as further accommodation for the borough council and as a "customer first centre".

Scarborough Town Hall is recorded in the National Heritage List for England as a Grade II listed building, having been designated on 8 June 1973. Grade II is the lowest of the three grades of listing, and is applied to "buildings that are nationally important and of special interest".

A proposed plan to sell the Victorian building and move to a new out-of-town purpose-built site was considered by the Conservative-run Scarborough Borough Council in March to July 2012. It was estimated that maintenance of the building could cost £5.7 million over the following 25 years and that an estimated £1.7 million would be needed for an IT upgrade. Though the plan was rejected, the office accommodation was considered too large, in poor condition and costing too much to bring up to standard, leading to a second plan in December 2012 to reduce office space by up to 71 per cent. A sum of £90,000 was invested in a complete replacement of the security system of the Town Hall in 2018.

Five of Scarborough Town Hall's historic rooms are licensed for weddings and other civil ceremonies, giving the Council a stream of income to help conserve and maintain it.

== Architecture ==
The Town Hall takes the form of a Jacobean-style mansion with two-storeys plus attic, of red brick with stone dressings, string courses, cornice and parapet, whose main south front is set on a strapwork balustraded terrace to public gardens. Along this main front are Dutch gabled bays to the left and centre, and to the right, a pair of square turrets with leaded ogee domes, between which is a large stained-glass oriel window. Another Dutch gabled block at the western end forms the main entrance from St Nicholas Street. The doorway is flanked by engaged stone Ionic columns on pedestals, topped by an entablature with a cartouche with pyramid finials.

Internally, the Town Hall features a Civic Parlour, Mayor's Parlour, Mayoral Corridor, Committee Room and Council Chamber. These are all lavishly decorated in a style Edwardian municipal grandeur, with plaster ceilings, fine carpets, and hardwood furniture and panelling; the Council Chamber also has an intricate wooden arched ceiling and raised public gallery.

View from the street

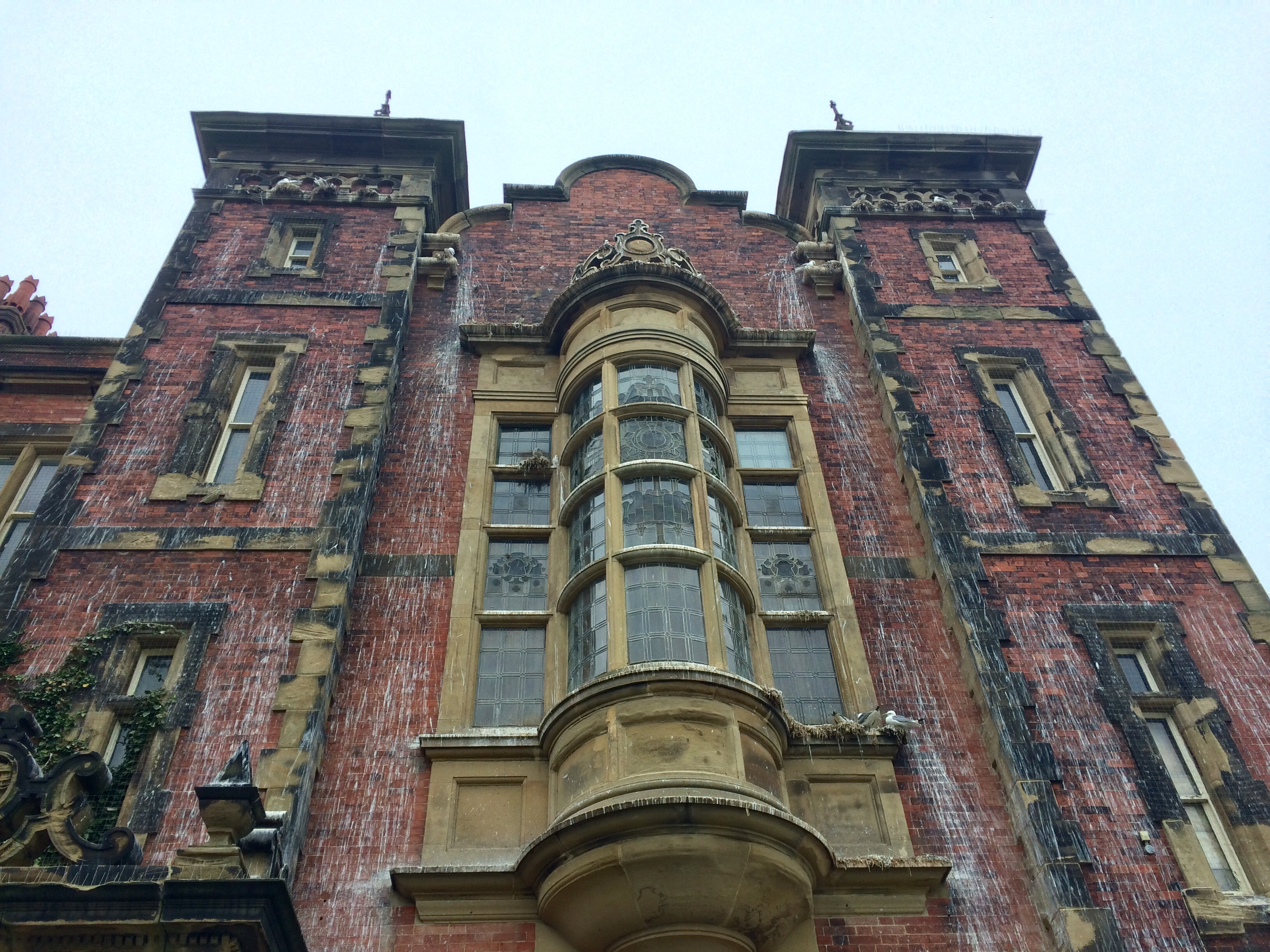
Oriel window and turrets

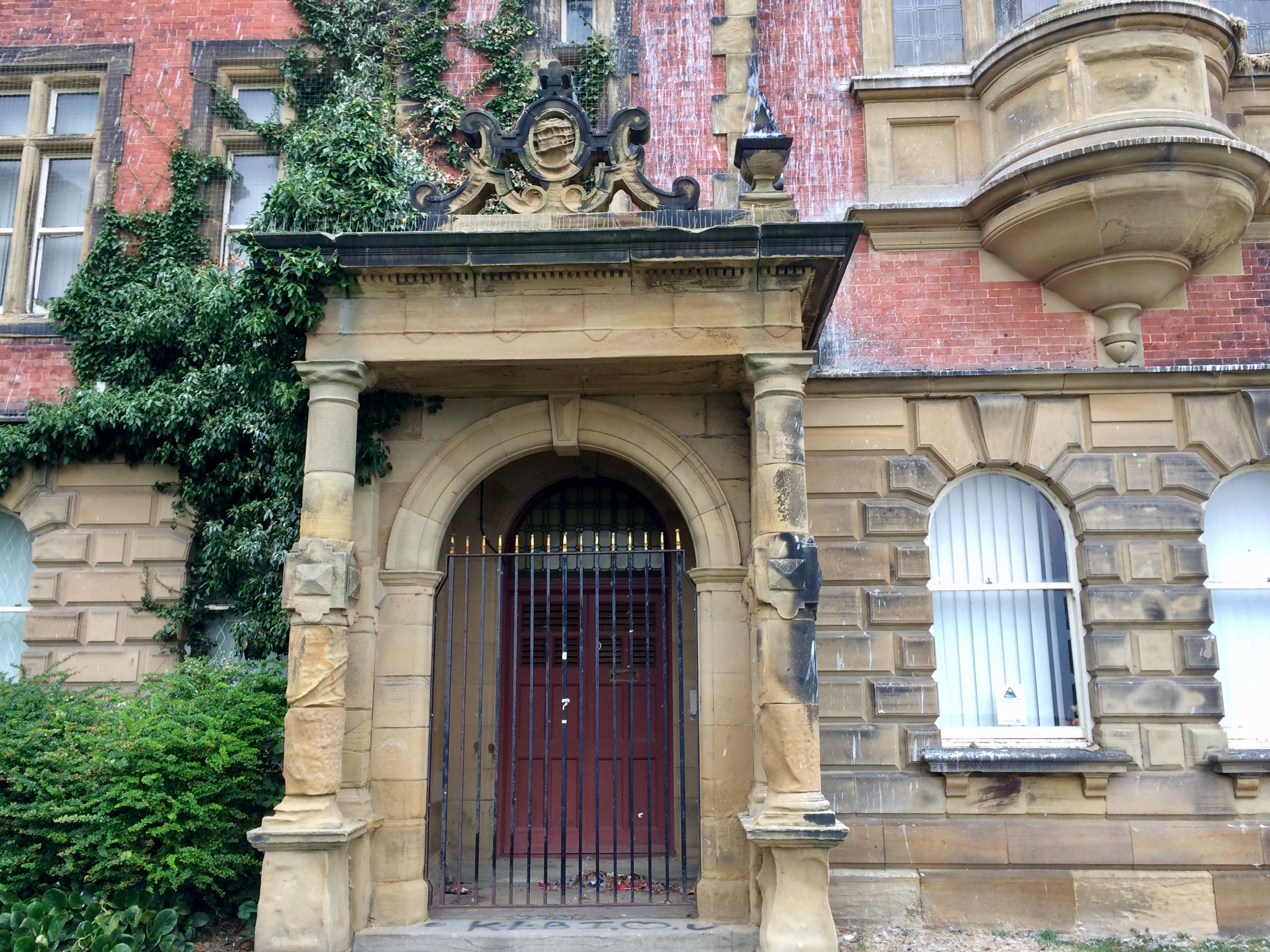
Side entrance

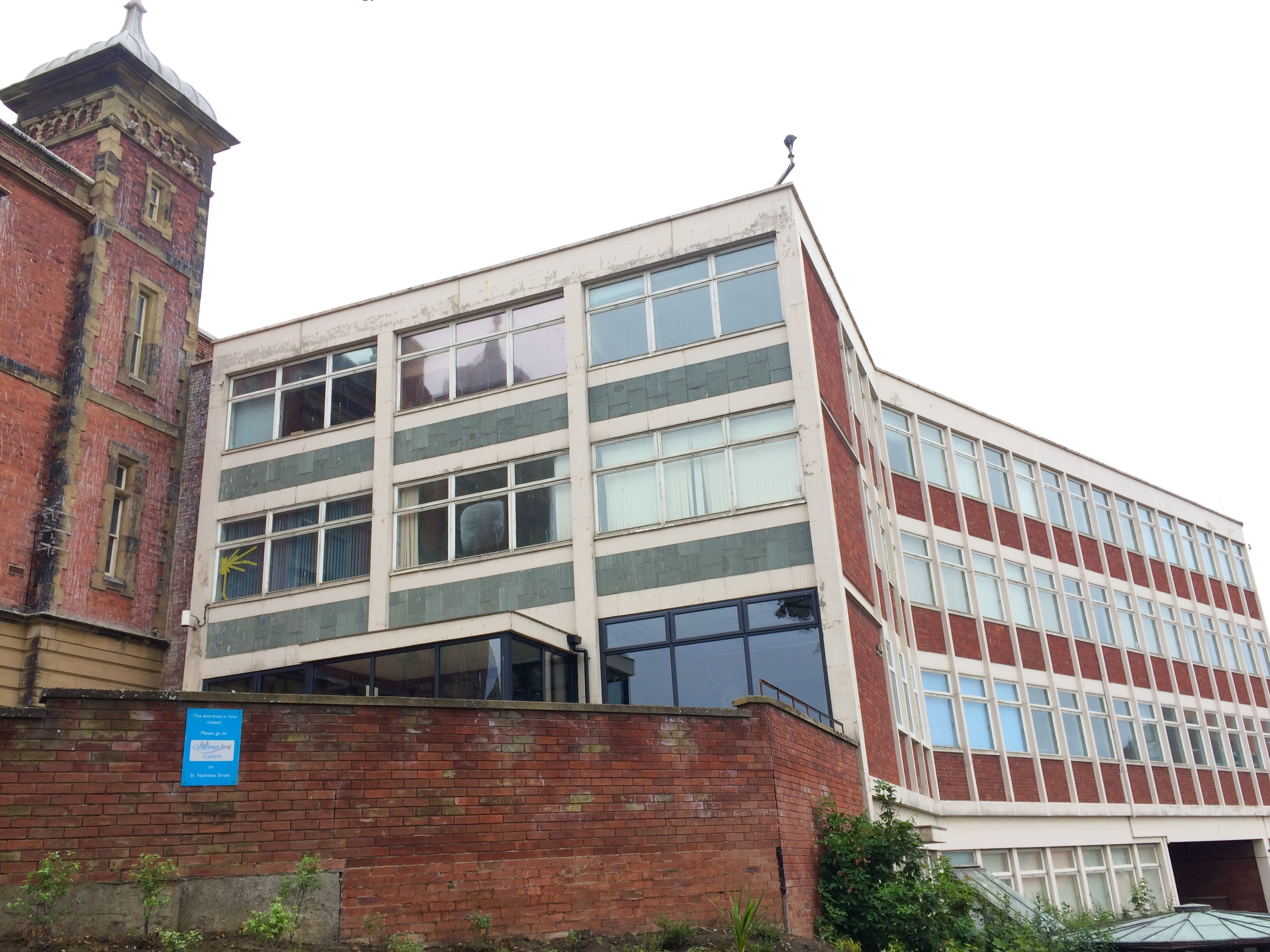
The 1960s extension to King Street

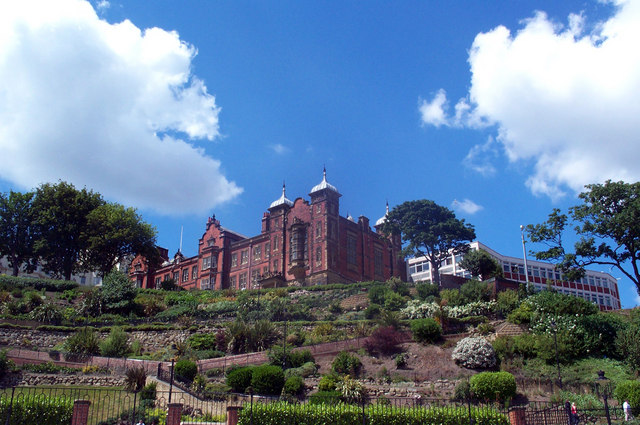
View from Foreshore Road

Statue of Victoria

== See also ==
- Listed buildings in Scarborough (Castle Ward)
