= Brunswick Shopping Centre =

Shopping centre in Scarborough, North Yorkshire, England

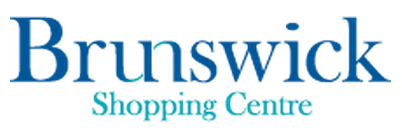
- Location: Scarborough, England
- Coordinates: 54.280°N 0.402°W
- Opened: 23 July 1990
- Closed: September 2025 (original mall)
- Developer: M&G Real Estate (formally PRUPIM Limited)
- Manager: Central Retail; Savills
- Owner: M&G Real Estate
- Num. of stores: 31
- Floor area: 130,000 sq ft (12,000 m^{2})
- Floors: 5 (including car parks & basement/loading bay)
- Parking: 350 spaces
- Website: brunswickshopping.com

The Brunswick Shopping Centre, with over 30 shops, is in the centre of Scarborough, North Yorkshire, England. It was built on the site of a former Debenhams store, which was an anchor tenant until its closure in May 2021. In 2014, it had an annual footfall of approximately 7 million people. The centre closed in September 2025, for redevelopment, to deliver a cinema and food court.

== Architecture ==
The design for the building, including its bow front, is influenced by the period architecture of Scarborough. The Brunswick Centre is a modern enclosed two-level building with a Debenhams store, Argos, New Look, and 28 other shops.

== Bathing Belle statue ==
In 2002 Scarborough Civic Society commissioned Sunderland artist, Craig Knowles, to create two sculptures for the town at a cost of £40,000. One of these, The Bathing Belle, was installed on a plinth outside the centre in April 2008. The cost of the statue was met through a mixture of grants, donations from businesses and private subscriptions.

== 2017 sale ==
On 4 April 2017 it was announced that M&G Real Estate were putting the freehold lease up for sale, after over two decades of ownership. The lease was priced at £31.75 million, listed through Knight Frank.

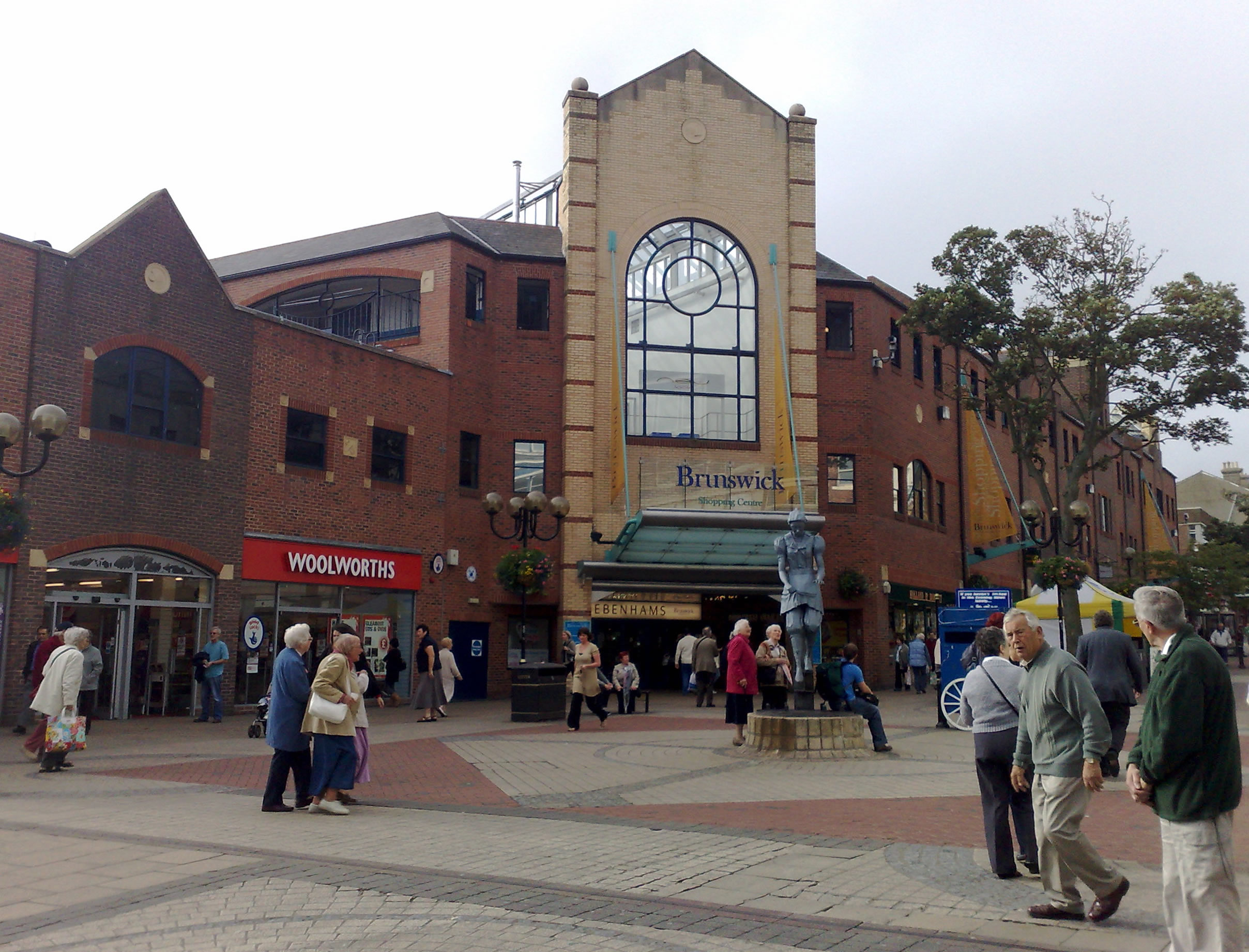
Front entrance

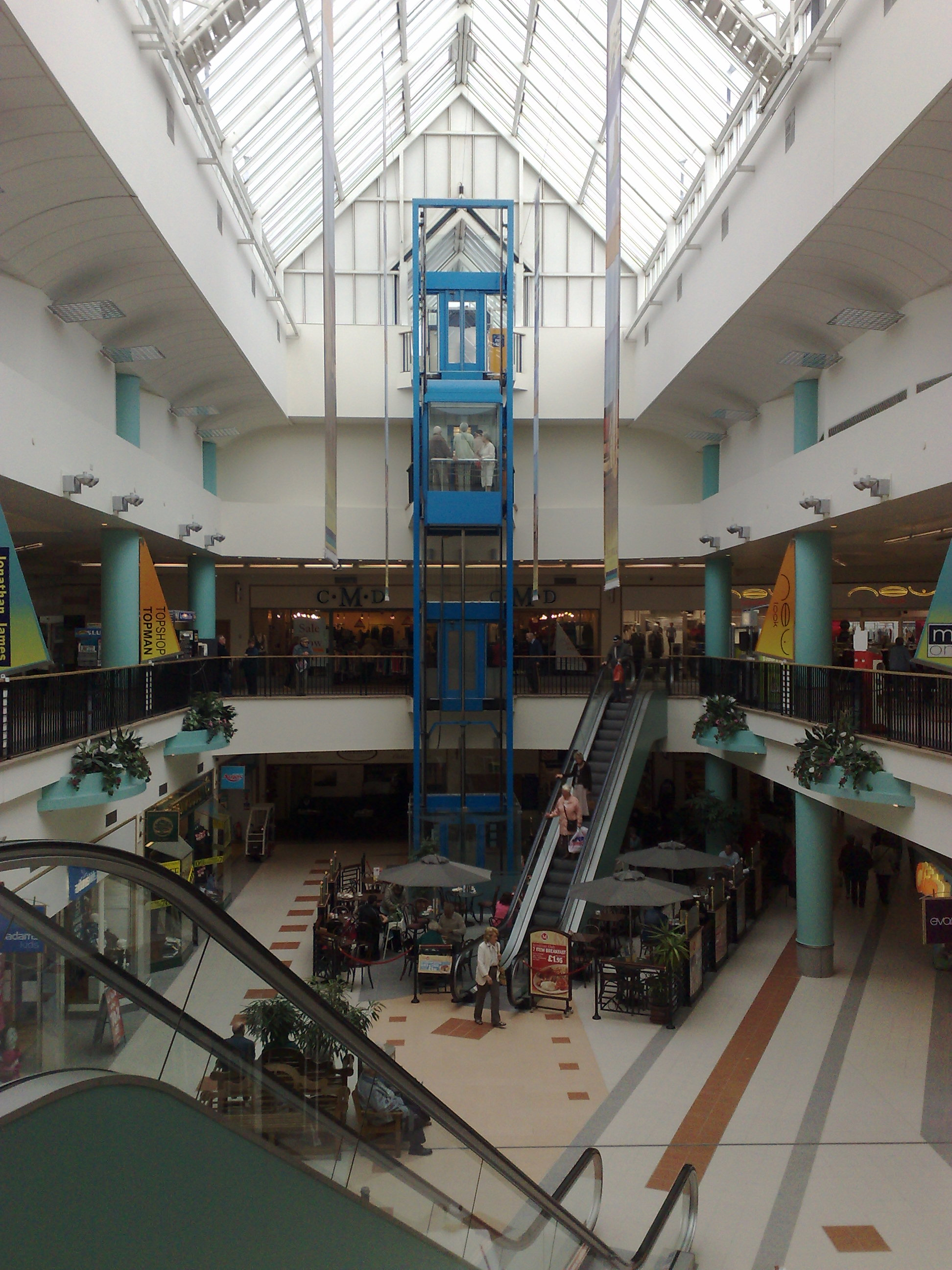
Interior

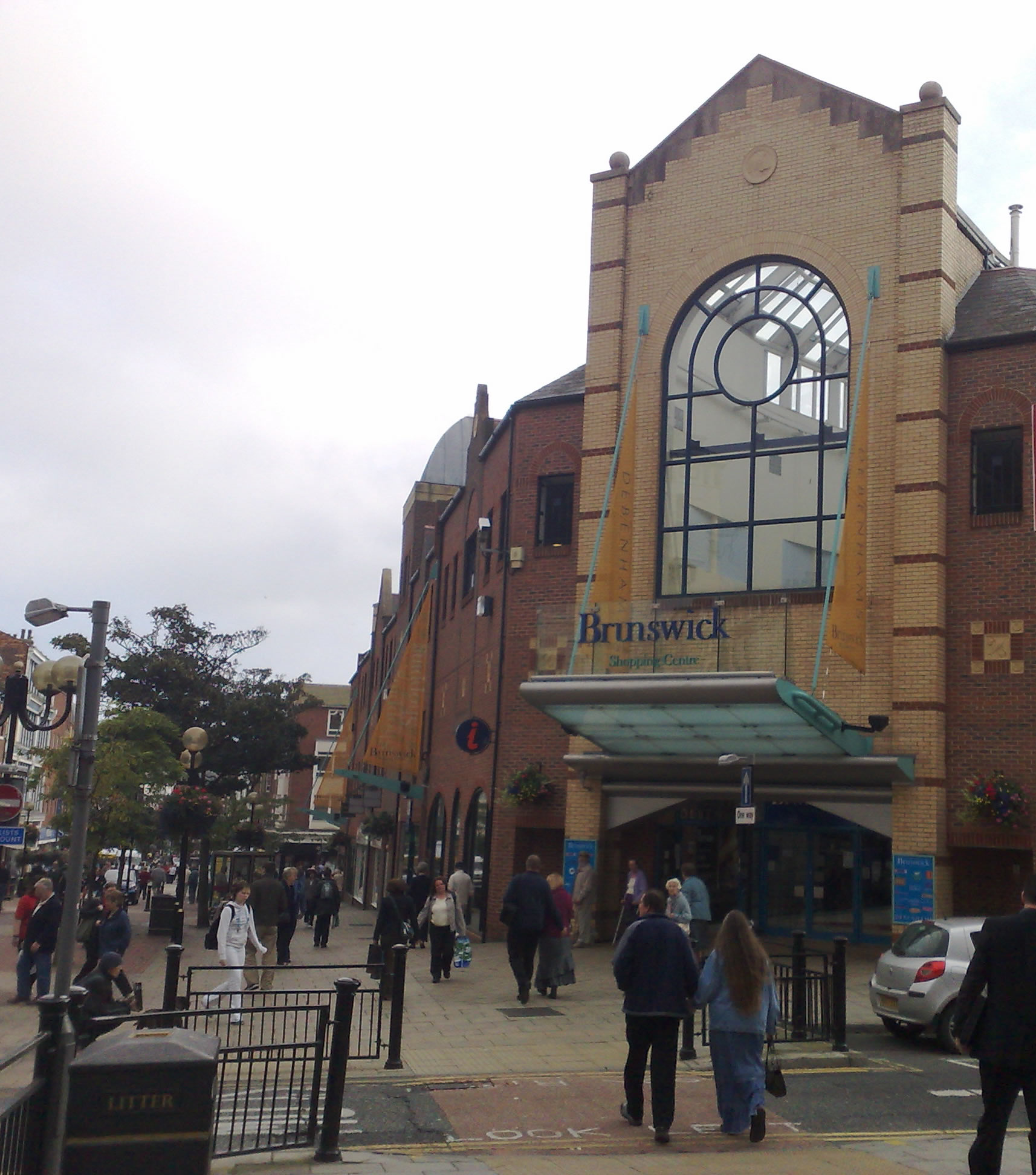
Rear entrance

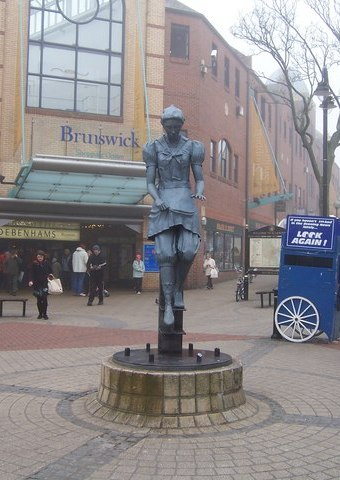
Bathing Belle Statue
