= Scarborough Harbour =

Harbour in Scarborough, North Yorkshire, England

Coordinates: 54.283°N 0.390°W

View from the castle

Scarborough Harbour is a sheltered area of water in the town of Scarborough, North Yorkshire, in England.

Scarborough Castle was built in the 12th century, and this spurred the development of the town of Scarborough. In the second half of the 13th century, what is now the Old Pier was built, to provide shelter for the Old Harbour. This became the most important harbour between the River Tees and the Humber Estuary, on the east coast of England. The Inner Island Pier was constructed to the west of the Old Pier, around 1325. While the shoreline of the harbour was initially on Quay Street, the harbour gradually sanded up, and Sandside was built on the new shoreline. By 1565/1566 the pier was in ruins, when Elizabeth I of England funded its rebuilding. Soon after 1732, Vincent's Pier was built, extending the line of the Old Pier and thereby enlarging the harbour, although it was only attached to the Old Pier by a drawbridge. It is named after William Vincent, who designed the structure. In 1800, the Scarborough Pier Lighthouse was erected on Vincent's Pier.

The Old Pier and Vincent's Pier, seen from across South Bay

The East Pier was constructed between 1790 and 1812, creating the East Harbour between it and the existing piers. John Smeaton acted as a consultant on the construction. It is 1,380 feet (420 m) long. In 1817, the Inner Island Pier was demolished, and replaced by the West Pier, more fully enclosing the Old Harbour. Later in the 19th century, buildings were constructed on the West Pier, including the harbour master's office, and fish sheds. In 1940, Scarborough Lifeboat Station was erected next to the pier. The piers have been regularly repaired, and in 2025, £1.8 million was allocated for repairs to the West Pier. There are plans to upgrade facilities on the pier, at a cost of £20 million.

The two older piers are built from stone rubble with timber shearings. The East and West piers are built of massive stone blocks, the largest weighing up to 30 tons. The East Pier is built in a curve. The piers are collectively grade II listed.

Boats in the harbour, with the town and the castle in the background

In the early 19th century, shipbuilding took place in the Old Harbour. Today, the East Harbour is used for mooring pleasure craft, while the Old Harbour is largely used by commercial vessels, including the town's fishing fleet. It also has a slipway providing access from Sandside. From 2020 until 2025, SeaGrown's "Southern Star" was moored in the harbour, with a visitor centre, cafe, and seaweed hatchery. There is a sculpture of seaweed on the East Pier, and one entitled "Diving Belle" on Vincent's Pier.

== See also ==
- Big-game tunny fishing off Scarborough
- Listed buildings in Scarborough (Castle Ward)
- Yorkshire coast fishery
