= Continuously variable transmission =

Automotive transmission technology

Pulley-based CVT

A continuously variable transmission (CVT) is an automatic transmission that can change through a continuous range of gear ratios, typically resulting in better fuel economy in gasoline applications. This contrasts with other transmissions that provide a limited number of gear ratios in fixed steps. The flexibility of a CVT with suitable control may allow the engine to operate at a constant angular velocity while the vehicle moves at varying speeds. Thus, CVT has a simpler structure, longer internal component lifespan in theory, and potentially greater durability. Compared to traditional or standard automatic transmissions, it offers lower fuel consumption and greater environmental friendliness.

CVTs are used in cars, tractors, side-by-sides, motor scooters, snowmobiles, bicycles, and heavy equipment. The most common type of CVT uses two pulleys connected by a belt or chain; however, several other designs have also been used at times.

== Types ==
=== Pulley-based ===
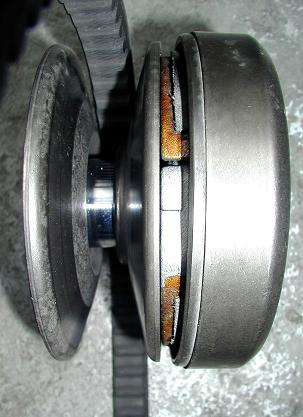
Belt-driven CVT for a motor scooter

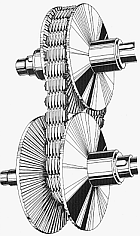
A PIV chain drive

CVT in a Claas Mercator combine harvester. The pulley's effective diameter is changed by pushing the two conical discs either towards or away from each other.

The most common type of CVT uses a V-belt which runs between two variable-diameter pulleys. The pulleys consist of two cone-shaped halves that move together and apart. The V-belt runs between these two halves, so the effective diameter of the pulley is dependent on the distance between the two halves of the pulley. The V-shaped cross-section of the belt causes it to ride higher on one pulley and lower on the other; therefore, the gear ratio is adjusted by moving the two sheaves of one pulley closer together and the two sheaves of the other pulley farther apart.

As the distance between the pulleys and the length of the belt does not change, both pulleys must be adjusted (one bigger, the other smaller) simultaneously to maintain the proper amount of tension on the belt. Simple CVTs combining a centrifugal drive pulley with a spring-loaded driven pulley often use belt tension to effect the conforming adjustments in the driven pulley. The V-belt needs to be very stiff in the pulley's axial direction to make only short radial movements while sliding in and out of the pulleys.

The radial thickness of the belt is a compromise between the maximum gear ratio and torque. Steel-reinforced V-belts are sufficient for low-mass, low-torque applications like utility vehicles and snowmobiles, but higher-mass and -torque applications such as automobiles require a chain. Each element of the chain must have conical sides that fit the pulley when the belt is running on the outermost radius. As the chain moves into the pulleys the contact area gets smaller. As the contact area is proportional to the number of elements, chain belts require many very small elements.

A belt-driven design offers approximately 88% efficiency, which, while lower than that of a manual transmission, can be offset by enabling the engine to run at its most efficient speed regardless of the vehicle's speed. When power is more important than economy, the ratio of the CVT can be changed to allow the engine to turn at the speed at which it produces the greatest power.

In a chain-based CVT, numerous chain elements are arranged along multiple steel bands layered over one another, each of which is thin enough to easily bend. When part of the belt is wrapped around a pulley, the sides of the elements form a conical surface. In the stack of bands, each band corresponds to a slightly different drive ratio, and thus the bands slide over each other and need sufficient lubrication. An additional film of lubricant is applied to the pulleys. The film needs to be thick enough to prevent direct contact between the pulley and the chain, but thin enough to not waste power as each chain element enters it.

Some CVTs transfer power to the output pulley via tension in the belt (a "pulling" force), while others use compression of the chain elements (where the input pulley "pushes" the belt, which in turn pushes the output pulley).

Positively infinitely variable (PIV) chain drives are distinct in that the chain positively interlocks with the conical pulleys. This is achieved by having a stack of many small rectangular plates in each chain link that can slide independently from side to side. The plates may be quite thin, around a millimeter thick. The conical pulleys have radial grooves. A groove on one side of the pulley is met with a ridge on the other side and so the sliding plates are pushed back and forth to conform to the pattern, effectively forming teeth of the correct pitch when squeezed between the pulleys. Due to the interlocking surfaces, this type of drive can transmit significant torque and so has been widely used in industrial applications. However, the maximum speed is significantly lower than other pulley-based CVTs. The sliding plates will slowly wear over years of usage. Therefore the plates are made longer than is needed, allowing for more wear before the chain must be refurbished or replaced. Constant lubrication is required and so the housing is usually partially filled with oil.

=== Toroidal ===
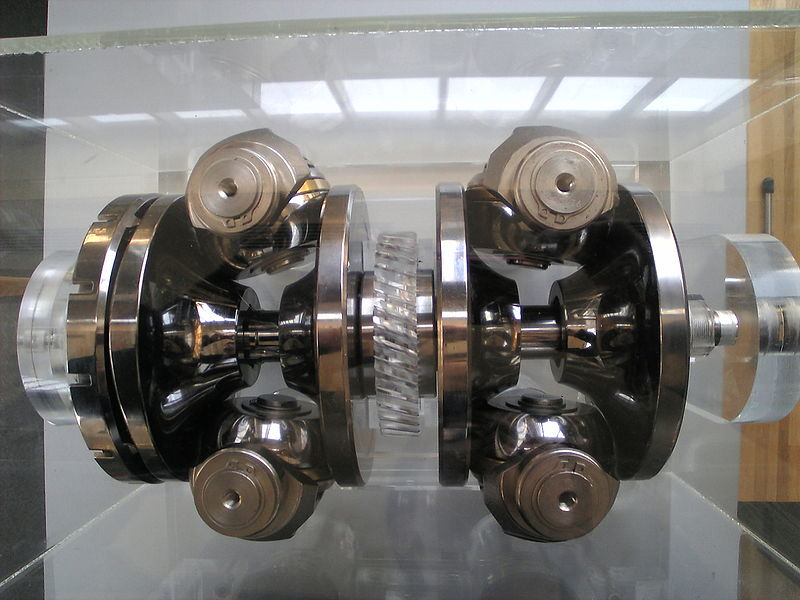
Toroidal CVT used in the Nissan Cedric (Y34)

A toroidal CVT, as used on the Nissan Cedric (Y34), and those built by CVTCORP, consists of a series of discs and rollers. The discs are arranged in pairs, and are shaped such that the void space between them forms a torus, allowing the round rollers to rotate in place. By rotating the rollers, their contact areas move inward along the input disc and outward along the output disc, or vice versa, changing the effective gear ratio of the transmission.

Toroidal CVTs can generally withstand higher torque loads than a pulley-based CVT. In some toroidal systems, the direction of thrust can be reversed within the CVT, removing the need for an external device to provide a reverse gear.

=== Ratcheting ===
A ratcheting CVT uses a series of one-way clutches or ratchets that rectify and sum only "forward" motion. The on–off characteristics of a typical ratchet mean that many of these designs are not continuous in operation (i.e. technically not a CVT), but in practice, there are many similarities in operation, and a ratcheting CVT is able to produce a zero-output speed from any given input speed (as per an infinitely variable transmission). The drive ratio is adjusted by changing linkage geometry within the oscillating elements so that the summed maximum linkage speed is adjusted, even when the average linkage speed remains constant.

Ratcheting CVTs can transfer substantial torque because their static friction actually increases relative to torque throughput, so slippage is impossible in properly designed systems. Efficiency is generally high because most of the dynamic friction is caused by very slight transitional clutch speed changes. The drawback to ratcheting CVTs is the vibration caused by the successive transition in speed required to accelerate the element, which must supplant the previously operating and decelerating power-transmitting element.

The design principle dates back to before the 1930s, with the original design intended to convert rotary motion to oscillating motion and back to rotary motion using roller clutches. This design remains in production as of 2017, for use with low-speed electric motors. An example prototyped as a bicycle transmission was patented in 1994. The operating principle for a ratcheting CVT design, using a Scotch yoke mechanism to convert rotary motion to oscillating motion and non-circular gears to achieve uniform input to output ratio, was patented in 2014.

=== Hydrostatic/hydraulic ===
A hydrostatic CVT uses an engine-driven, positive-displacement pump to deliver oil under pressure to one or more hydraulic motors, the latter creating the torque that is applied to the vehicle's driving wheel(s). The name hydrostatic CVT, which misuses the term hydrostatic, differentiates this type of transmission from one that incorporates a hydrodynamic torque multiplier (torque converter) into its design.

In a hydrostatic CVT, the effective "gear ratio" between the engine and the driving wheel(s) is the result of a difference between the pump's displacement—expressed as cubic inches or cubic centimeters per revolution—and the motor's displacement. In a closed system, that is, a system in which all of the pump's output is delivered to the motor(s), this ratio is given by the equation GR = Dm ÷ Dp, where Dp is the pump's effective displacement, Dm is the motor's displacement, and GR is the "gear ratio".

In a hydrostatic CVT, the effective "gear ratio" is varied by varying effective displacement of the pump, which will vary the volume of oil delivered to the motor(s) at a given engine speed (RPM). There are several ways in which this may be accomplished, one being to divert some of the pump's output back to the reservoir through an adjustable valve. With such an arrangement, as more oil is diverted by opening the valve, the effective displacement of the pump is reduced and less oil is delivered to the motor, causing it to turn more slowly. Conversely, closing the valve will reduce the volume of oil being diverted, increasing the effective displacement of the pump and causing the motor to turn more rapidly.

Another method is to employ a variable displacement pump. When the pump is configured for low displacement, it produces a low volume of oil flow, causing the hydraulic motor(s) to turn more slowly. As the pump's displacement is increased, a greater volume of oil flow is produced for any given engine speed, causing the motor(s) to turn faster.

Advantages of a hydrostatic CVT include:

- Capacity scalability. A hydrostatic CVT's power-transmission capacity is readily adapted to the application by using a correctly-sized pump and matching hydraulic motor(s).
- Flexibility. As power transfer from the engine-driven pump to the hydraulic motor(s) is through the medium of flowing oil, the motor(s) can be mounted in otherwise-inconvenient locations by using hoses to convey oil from the pump to the motor(s), thus simplifying the design of all-wheel–drive articulated vehicles.
- Smoothness. As the effective "gear ratio" of a hydrostatic CVT is infinitely variable, there are no distinct transitions in torque multiplication, such as produced with conventional, geared transmissions.
- Simplified control. Operation through the full range of forward and reverse speeds can be controlled using a single lever or a foot pedal to actuate a diversion valve or variable-displacement pump.
- Arbitrarily slow crawl speeds. The potential for high torque multiplication at very low speeds allows for precise vehicle movement while under load.

Disadvantages of a hydrostatic CVT include:

- Reduced efficiency. Gears are one of the most efficient methods of mechanical power transmission, with efficiencies as high as 90 percent in many cases. In contrast, few hydrostatic transmission systems achieve more than about 65 percent efficiency. This is due to a combination of internal losses in the pump and motor(s), and losses in the piping and valves.
- Higher cost. For a given level of power-transmitting capacity, a hydrostatic CVT will be more expensive to produce than an equivalent geared transmission. In addition to the pump and motor(s), a hydrostatic system requires the use of an oil reservoir, piping and in many applications, an oil cooler, this last item being necessary to dissipate the waste heat that results from hydrostatic power transmission's relatively low efficiency.
- Greater weight. Due to the high oil pressure at which a hydrostatic CVT operates, the pump and motor(s) are under considerable mechanical stress, especially when maximum power and loading is being applied. Hence these items must be very robust in construction, typically resulting in heavy components. Additional weight will be found in the oil reservoir and its oil load, as well as the piping and valving.

Uses of hydrostatic CVTs include forage harvesters, combine harvesters, small wheeled/tracked/skid-steer loaders, crawler tractors, and road rollers. One agricultural example, produced by AGCO, splits power between hydrostatic and mechanical transfer to the output shaft via a planetary gear in the forward direction of travel (in reverse, the power transfer is fully hydrostatic). This arrangement reduces the load on the hydrostatic portion of the transmission when in the forward direction by transmitting a significant portion of the torque through more efficient fixed gears.

A variant called the Integrated Hydrostatic Transaxle (IHT) uses a single housing for both hydraulic elements and gear-reducing elements and is used in some mini-tractors and ride-on lawn mowers.

The 2008–2010 Honda DN-01 cruiser motorcycle used a hydrostatic CVT in the form of a variable-displacement axial piston pump with a variable-angle swashplate.

=== Cone ===
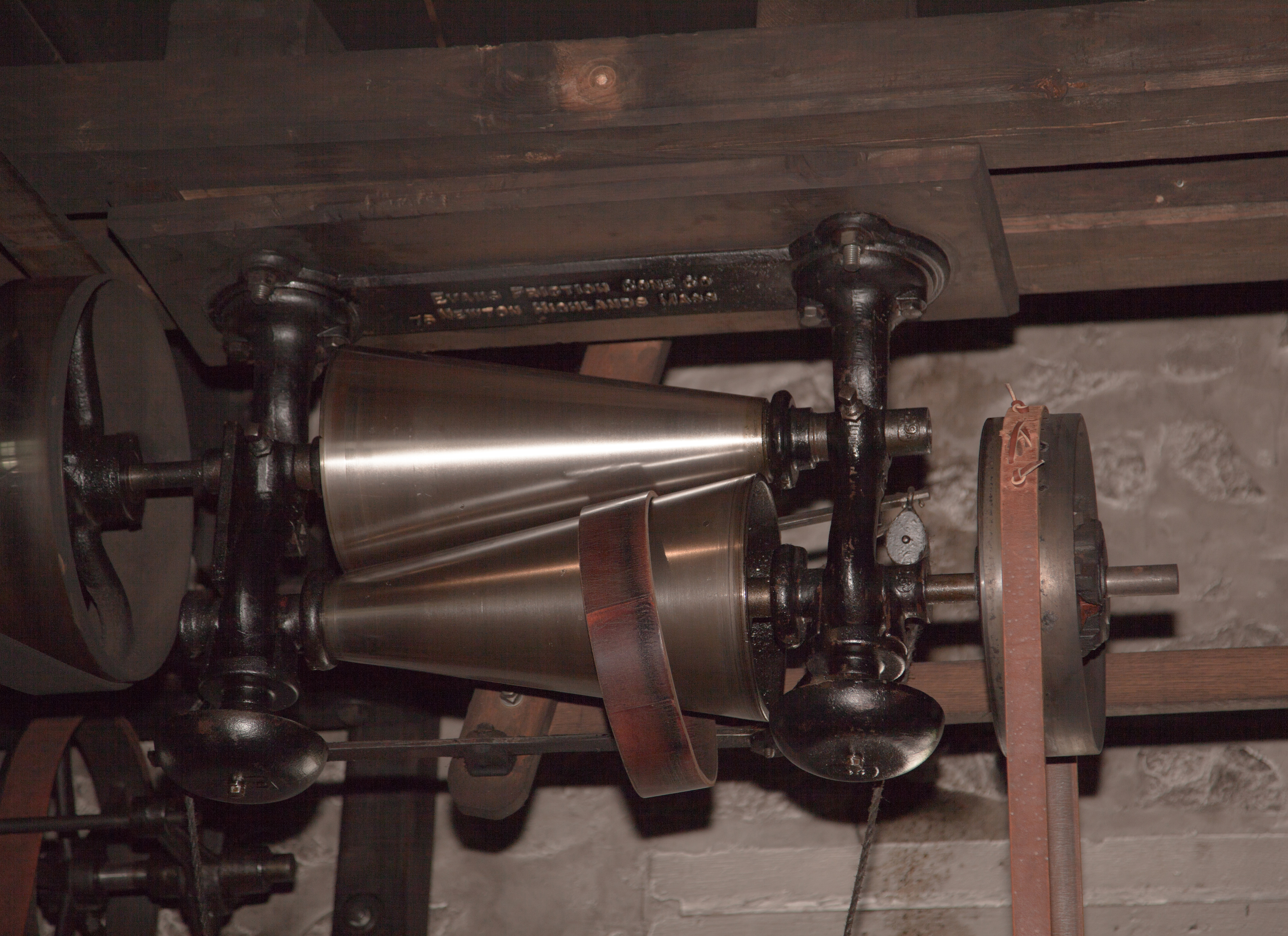
Evans Variable Speed Countershaft

A cone CVT varies the drive ratio by moving a wheel or belt along the axis of one or more conical rollers. The simplest type of cone CVT, the single-cone version, uses a wheel that moves along the slope of the cone, creating variation between the narrow and wide diameters of the cone.

Some cone CVT designs use two rollers. In 1903, William Evans and Paul Knauf applied for a patent on a continuously variable transmission using two parallel conical rollers pointing in opposite directions and connected by belts that could be slid along the cones to vary the transmission ratio. The Evans Variable Speed Countershaft, produced in the 1920s, is simpler—the two rollers are arranged with a small constant-width gap between them, and the position of a leather cord that runs between the rollers determines the transmission ratio.

=== Hybrid electric ===
Several hybrid electric vehicles—such as the Toyota Prius, Ford Fusion/Lincoln MKZ Hybrid, Mitsubishi Outlander PHEV, and Ford Escape Hybrid—use electric variable transmissions (EVTs, sometimes eCVT) to control the contribution of power from the electric motor and the internal combustion engine. These differ from standard CVTs in that they are powered by an electric motor in addition to the engine, often using planetary gears to combine their outputs instead of a belt used in traditional CVTs. A notable example is the Toyota Hybrid Synergy Drive.

The design is known for its durability with engineers reporting that internal parts "looked perfect, and would have been good for many more miles" after a complete teardown of the HF45 eCVT in a hybrid Ford Escape which operated as a New York City taxi for 450,000 miles (720,000 km).

=== Other types ===
Friction-disk transmissions were used in several vehicles and small locomotives built in the early 20th century, including the Lambert and Metz automobiles. Used today in snow blowers, these transmissions consist of an output disk that is moved across the surface of the input disk upon which it rolls. When the output disk is adjusted to a position equal to its own radius, the resulting drive ratio is 1:1. The drive ratio can be set to infinity (i.e. a stationary output disk) by moving the output disk to the center of the input disk. The output direction can also be reversed by moving the output disk past the center of the input disk. The transmission on early Plymouth locomotives worked this way, while on tractors using friction disks, the range of reverse speeds was typically limited.

Still in development, the magnetic CVT transmits torque using a non-contact magnetic coupling. The design uses two rings of permanent magnets with a ring of steel pole pieces between them to create a planetary gearset using magnets. It is claimed to produce a 3 to 5 percent reduction in fuel consumption compared to a mechanical system.

== Infinitely variable transmissions ==
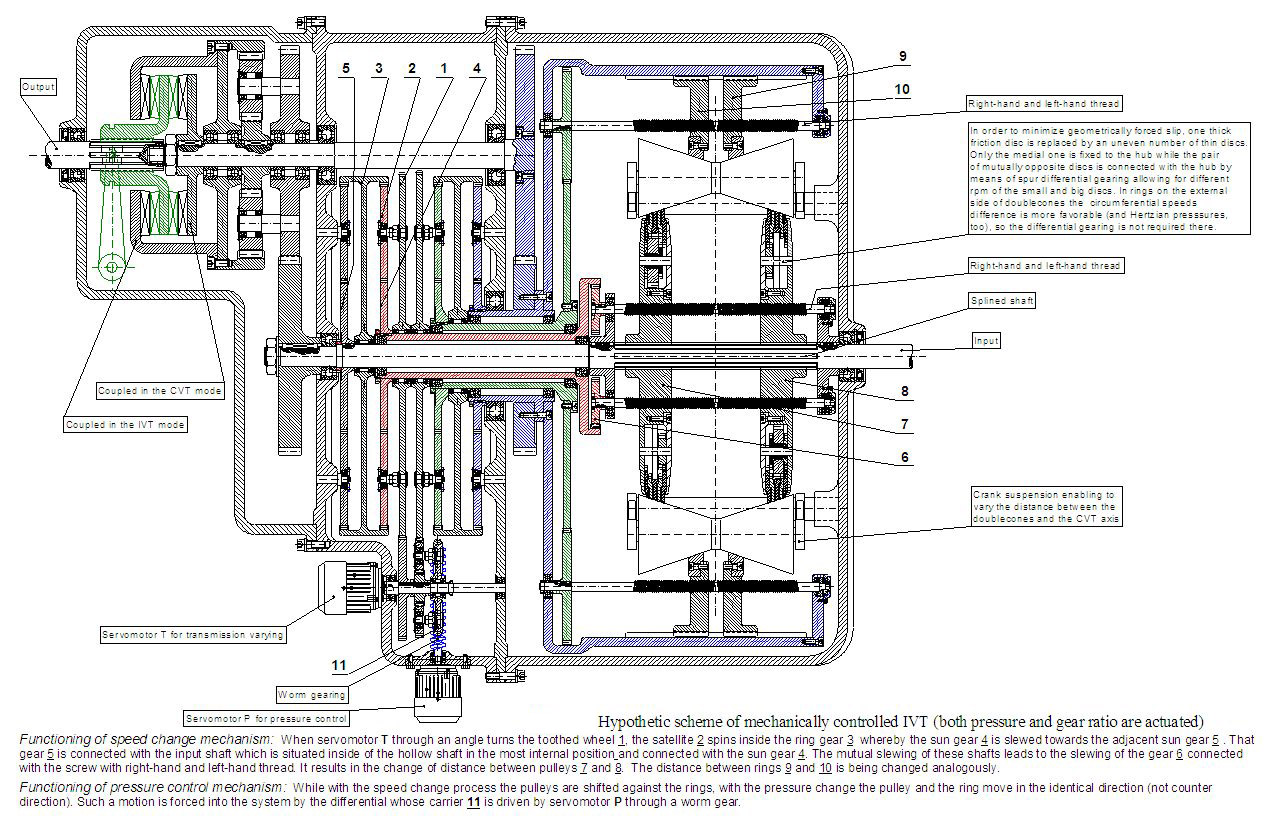
Diagram of an IVT

Some CVTs can also function as an infinitely variable transmission (IVT) which offers an infinite range of low gears (e.g. moving a vehicle forward at an infinitely slow speed). Some IVTs prevent back driving (where the output shaft can freely rotate, like an automotive transmission in neutral) due to providing high back-driving torque. Other IVTs, such as ratcheting types, allow the output shaft to freely rotate. The types of CVTs which are able to function as IVTs include epicyclic, friction-disk, and ratcheting CVTs.

== History ==
In the USA, in 1879, Milton Reeves invented a CVT (then called a 'variable-speed transmission') for use in sawmilling. In 1896, Reeves began fitting this transmission to his cars, and the Reeves CVT was also used by several other manufacturers.

The 1911 Zenith Gradua 6HP motorcycle used a pulley-based Gradua CVT. A year later, the Rudge-Whitworth Multigear was released with a similar but improved CVT. Other early cars to use a CVT were the 1913–1923 David small three-wheeled cyclecars built in Spain, the 1923 Clyno built in the U.K., and the 1926 Constantinesco Saloon built in the U.K.

== Applications ==
=== Passenger vehicles ===
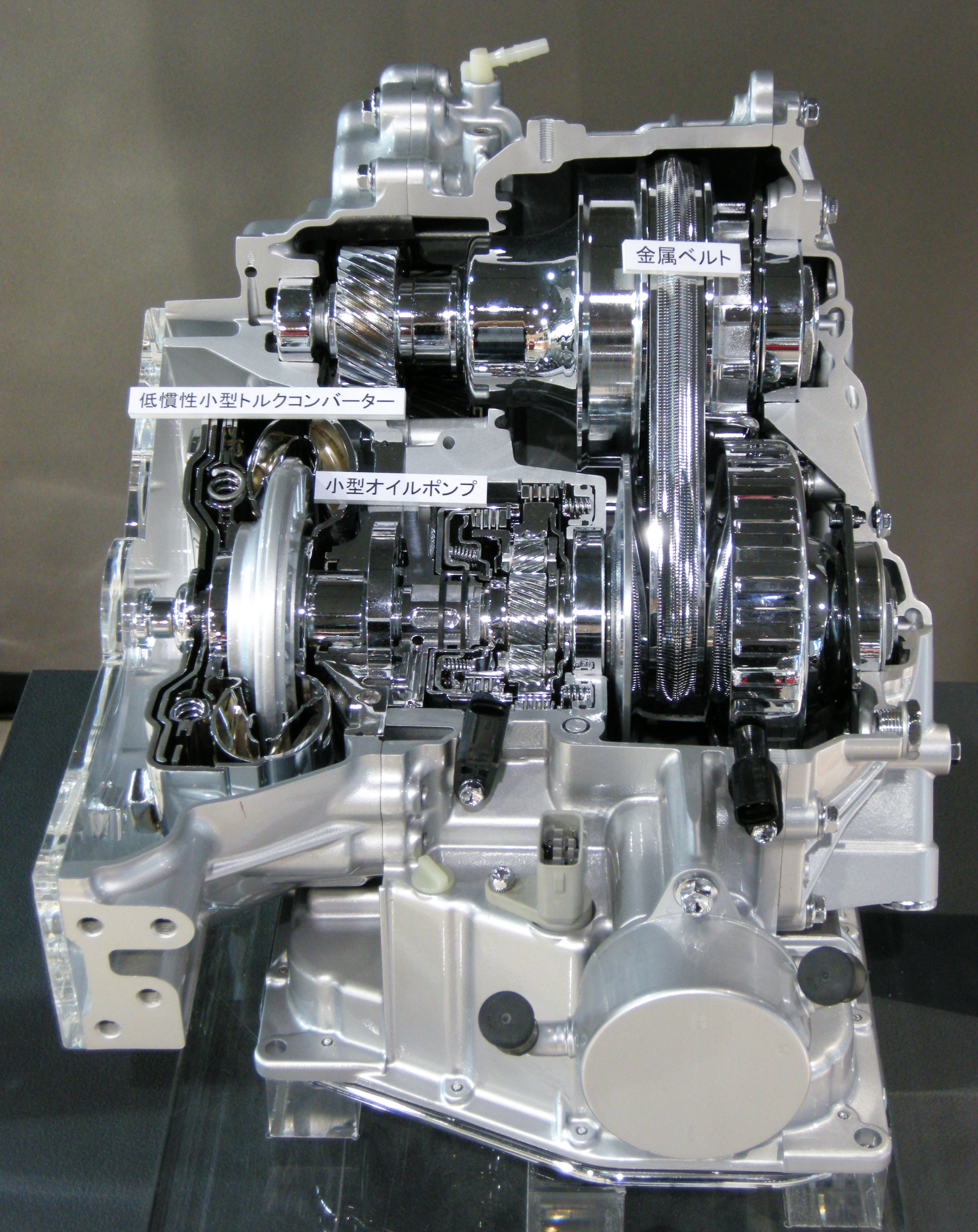
2000–present Toyota K CVT

In 1958, the Dutch DAF 600 became the first mass-production car to use a CVT. Its Variomatic transmission was used in several vehicles built by DAF and Volvo until the 1980s.

In 1987, the ECVT, the first electronically controlled steel-belted CVT, was introduced as an optional transmission on the Subaru Justy, Production was limited to 500 units per month due to the limited production output of Van Doorne Transmissie, the company that had taken over the Variomatic patents from DAF. In June of that year, supplies increased to 3,000 per month, leading Subaru to make the CVT available in the Rex kei car. Subaru has also supplied its CVTs to other manufacturers (e.g., the 1992 Nissan Micra and Fiat Uno and Panda). Also in 1987, second-generation Ford Fiesta and first-generation Fiat Uno were introduced with steel-belted CVTs, which are called CTX and Unomatic in Ford and Fiat, respectively.

The 1996 sixth-generation Honda Civic introduced a pulley-based Honda Multi Matic (HMM) CVT which included a multi-plate clutch, not a torque converter, to prevent idle creep.

The 1997 XW10 Toyota Prius introduced a new kind of CVT, called the Toyota Hybrid System (THS), and in later Toyota hybrid models as the Hybrid Synergy Drive, after further development. The THS performs better than other CVTs because it has no belts or chains but instead uses Epicyclic gearing setup with two inputs, with an electric motor coupled to one input, the engine to the other, and the output to the wheels through the differential. As the speed of the electric motor is varied, the effective gear ratio between the engine and wheels varies giving all of the advantages of a CVT with much improved reliability, it does however require higher power electrical systems and more complex electronics than a conventional car has available.

Use of CVTs then spread in the following years to models including the 1998 Nissan Cube, 1999 Rover 25 and 1999 Audi A6.

The 1999 Nissan Cedric (Y34) used a toroidal CVT—unlike the pulley-based designs used by other manufacturers—marketed as the Nissan Extroid, which incorporated a torque converter. Nissan then switched from toroidal to pulley-based CVTs in 2003 marketed as the Nissan Xtronic. The version of the CVT used with the VQ35DE engine in the fourth-generation Nissan Altima is claimed to be capable of transmitting higher torque loads than other belt CVTs.

The 2019 Toyota Corolla (E210) is available with a CVT assisted by a physical "launch gear" alongside the CVT pulley. At speeds of up to 40 km/h (25 mph), the launch gear is used to increase acceleration and reduce stress on the CVT. Above this speed, the transmission switches over to the CVT.

Marketing terms for CVTs include "Lineartronic" (Subaru), "Xtronic" (Jatco, Nissan, Renault), INVECS-III (Mitsubishi), Multitronic (Volkswagen, Audi), "Autotronic" (Mercedes-Benz) and "Intelligent Variable Transmission (IVT)" (Hyundai, Kia).

=== Racing cars ===
In the United States, Formula 500 open-wheel racing cars have used CVTs since the early 1970s. CVTs were prohibited from Formula One in 1994 (along with several other electronic systems and driving aids) due to concerns over escalating research and development costs and maintaining a specific level of driver involvement with the vehicles.

=== Small vehicles ===
Many small vehicles—such as snowmobiles, golf carts, and motor scooters—use CVTs, typically of the pulley variety. CVTs in these vehicles often use a rubber belt with a non-stretching fixed circumference manufactured using various highly durable and flexible materials, due to the mechanical simplicity and ease of use outweighing their comparative inefficiency. Some motor scooters include a centrifugal clutch, to assist when idling or manually reversing the scooter.

The 1974 Rokon RT340 TCR Automatic off-road motorcycle was fitted with a snowmobile CVT. The first ATV equipped with a CVT was the Polaris Trail Boss in 1985.

=== Farm and earthmoving equipment ===
Combine harvesters used variable belt drives as early as the 1950s. Many small tractors and self-propelled mowers for home and garden use simple rubber belt CVTs. Hydrostatic CVTs are more common on the larger units. In mowing or harvesting operations, the CVT allows the forward speed of the equipment to be adjusted independently of the engine speed; this allows the operator to slow or accelerate as needed to accommodate variations in the thickness of the crop.

Hydrostatic CVTs are used in small- to medium-sized agricultural and earthmoving equipment. Since the engines in these machines are typically run at constant power output (to provide hydraulic power or to power machinery), losses in mechanical efficiency are offset by enhanced operational efficiency. For example, in earthmoving equipment, the forward-reverse shuttle times are reduced. The speed and power output of the CVT is used to control the travel speed and sometimes steering of the equipment. In the latter case, the required speed differential to steer the equipment can be supplied by independent CVTs, allowing the steering to be accomplished without several drawbacks associated with other skid steer methods (such as braking losses or loss of tractive effort).

The 1965 Wheel Horse 875 and 1075 garden tractors were the first such vehicles to be fitted with a hydrostatic CVT. The design used a variable-displacement swash-plate pump and fixed-displacement gear-type hydraulic motor combined into a single compact package. Reverse ratios were achieved by reversing the flow of the pump through over-centering of the swashplate. Acceleration was limited and smoothed through the use of pressure accumulator and relief valves located between the pump and motor, to prevent the sudden changes in speed possible with direct hydraulic coupling. Subsequent versions included fixed swash plate motors and ball pumps.

The 1996 Fendt Vario 926 was the first heavy-duty tractor to be equipped with a IVT transmission. It is not the same thing as a hydrostatic CVT. Over 100,000 tractors have been produced with this transmission.

=== Power generation systems ===
CVTs have been used in aircraft electrical power generation systems since the 1950s.

CVTs with flywheels are used as a speed governor between an engine (e.g. a wind turbine) and the electric generator. When the engine is producing sufficient power, the generator is connected directly to the CVT which serves to regulate the engine's speed. When the power output is too low, the generator is disconnected, and the energy is stored in the flywheel. It is only when the speed of the flywheel is sufficient that the kinetic energy is converted into electricity, intermittently, at the speed required by the generator.

=== Other uses ===
Some drill presses and milling machines contain a simple belt-drive CVT system to control the speed of the spindle, including the Jet models J-A5816 and J-A5818. In this system, the effective diameter of only the output shaft pulleys is continuously variable. The input pulley connected to the motor is usually fixed in diameter (or sometimes with discrete steps to allow a selection of speed ranges). The operator adjusts the speed of the drill by using a hand wheel that controls the width of the gap between the pulley halves. A tensioner pulley is implemented in the belt transmission to take up or release the slack in the belt as the speed is altered.

Winches and hoists are also an application of CVTs, especially for those adapting the transmission ratio to the resistant torque.

Bicycles with CVT gearing have had limited commercial success, with one example providing a range of gearing equivalent to an eight-speed shifter. The bicycle's short gearing assisted when cycling uphill, but the CVT was noted to significantly increase the weight of the bicycle.

The increasing adoption of the electric bicycle has brought a reappraisal of the CVT as an alternative to traditional drive train set up in comparison to gearing systems historically applied on human powered bicycles. The handsfree and continuously stepless operation combined with low maintenance make the CVT a solution for use on city e-bikes and by commuters.

== See also ==
- Constant speed drive
- Friction drive
- List of automobiles with continuously variable transmissions
- Power band
