= Idle (engine) =

Lowest operating speed of an engine

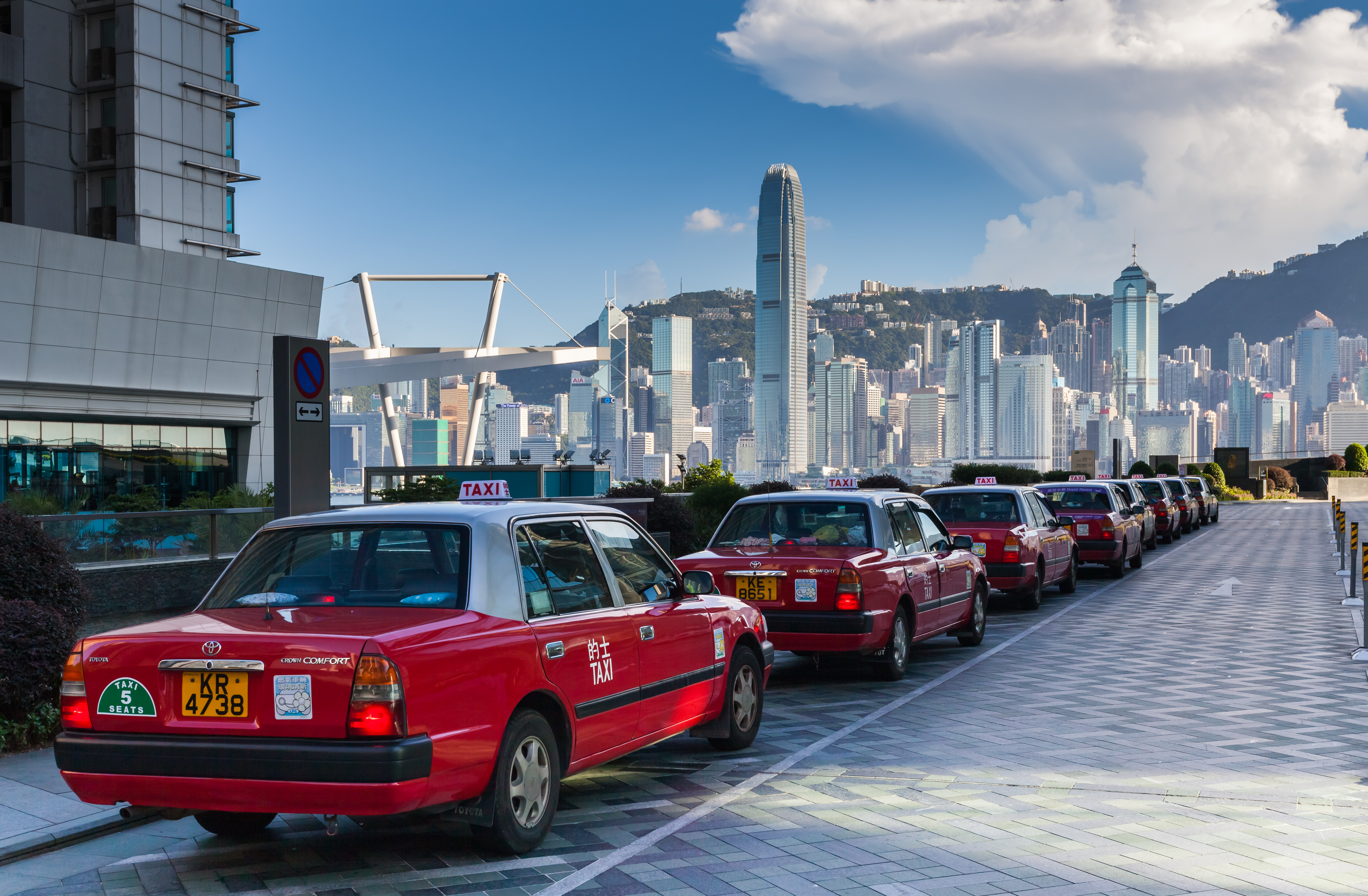
A row of taxis idling in Hong Kong

Idling refers to running an engine at its lowest operating speed (RPM) with no throttle input. In passenger vehicles, this commonly occurs when drivers are stopped at a red light, waiting while parked outside a business or residence, or otherwise stationary with the engine running.

== Idle speed ==
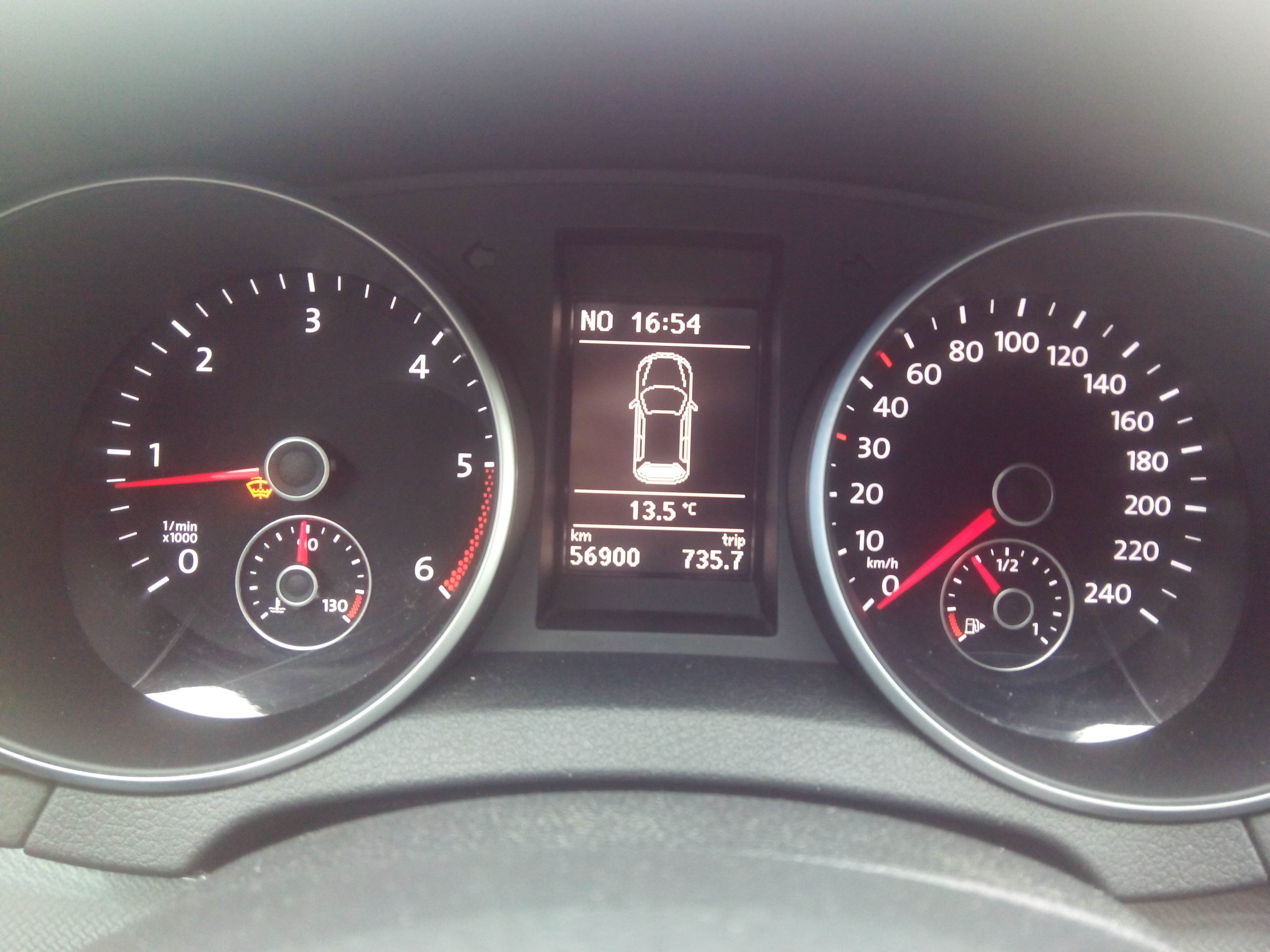
Tachometer (left) of a Volkswagen Golf Mk6 passenger car idling at just below 800 r/min.

Idle speed, sometimes simply called "idle", is the rotational speed an engine runs at when the engine is idling, that is when the engine is uncoupled from the drivetrain and the throttle pedal is not depressed. In combustion engines, idle speed is generally measured in revolutions per minute (rpm) of the crankshaft. At idle speed, the engine generates enough power to run reasonably smoothly and operate its ancillaries (water pump, alternator, and, if equipped, other accessories such as power steering), but usually not enough to perform useful work, such as moving an automobile unless it is set too high. The opposite of idle speed is redline, the maximum rotational speed the engine can be run at without risking serious engine damage.

== Car, truck, and motorcycle engines ==
For a passenger car engine, idle speed is customarily between 600 and 1000 rpm. For medium and heavy duty trucks, it is approximately 600 rpm. For many single-cylinder motorcycle engines, idle speed is set between 900 and 1100 rpm. Two-cylinder motorcycle engines are often set around 1000 rpm.

If the engine is operating a large number of accessories, particularly air conditioning, the idle speed must be raised to ensure that the engine generates enough power to run smoothly and operate the accessories. Most air conditioning-equipped engines have an automatic adjustment feature in the carburetor or fuel injection system that raises the idle when the air conditioning is running.

Engines modified for power at high engine speeds, such as auto racing engines, tend to have very rough (unstable) idle unless the idle speed is raised significantly.

Idle speed may refer to the idle creep of a vehicle with an automatic transmission.

== Aircraft engines ==
Commercial aircraft descend with a minimum thrust, that is, the engines are operating at idle speed. This situation happens when an aircraft is gliding and during the landing flare, for approach the engines are usually not operated at idle power.

== Vehicle emissions ==
Both running an engine and idling an engine produce several pollutants that are monitored in the United States by the Environmental Protection Agency (EPA):

It is often believed that stopping and restarting the engine uses more fuel than idling. According to the Environmental Defense Fund citing an engine studies report from 2000 by Environment and Climate Change Canada, an engine restart uses fuel approximately equal to 10 seconds of idling. Consequently, recommendations have been made to shut off a car's engine after ten seconds of idling to reduce emissions.

=== Winter conditions ===
Assuming a temperature of -1 °C (30 °F), and with a gasoline Reid vapor pressure (RVP) of 896 hPa (13.0) psi.

Pollutant	LDGV	LDGT	HDGV	LDDV	LDDT	HDDV	MC
VOC [g/min]	0.352	0.512	0.734	0.061	0.080	0.211	0.335
CO [g/min]	6.19	8.12	11.4	0.168	0.191	1.58	6.47
NOx [g/min]	0.103	0.125	0.196	0.111	0.115	0.945	0.042

Legend:

- LDGV – Light duty gasoline vehicle
- LDGT – Light duty gasoline truck
- HDGV – Heavy duty gasoline vehicle
- LDDV – Light duty diesel vehicle
- LDDT – Light duty diesel truck
- HDDV – Heavy duty diesel vehicle
- MC – Motorcycle

=== Summer conditions ===
Assuming a temperature of 24 °C (75 °F), and with a gasoline Reid vapor pressure of 620 hPa (9.0 psi).

Pollutant	LDGV	LDGT	HDGV	LDDV	LDDT	HDDV	MC
VOC [g/min]	0.269	0.401	0.597	0.059	0.077	0.208	0.324
CO [g/min]	3.82	5.65	12.3	0.166	0.187	1.57	7.26
NOx [g/min]	0.079	0.095	0.170	0.108	0.111	0.917	0.028

== Health effects of idling pollutants ==
Health effects of idling are related to engine exhaust, and include acute effects such as eye, throat, and bronchial irritation; nausea; cough, phlegm congestion; allergic or asthma-like respiratory response; increased risk for cardiac events; cancer, and chronic effects, such as bronchitis, decreased lung function, damage to reproductive function (low birth weight and damage to sperm chromatin and DNA).

These health effects are more damaging in those with preexisting heart disease, asthma, or other lung problems. Children are also more susceptible, due to their faster breathing rate and the fact that their respiratory system is still developing. Idling pollutants also disproportionately affect the elderly, who have limited physiological reserve to compensate for the adverse effects of the pollutants.

== Strategies to reduce idling in traffic ==
Effort has been made to reduce the amount of time engines spend idling, chiefly due to fuel economy and emissions concerns, although some engines can also be damaged if kept idling for extended periods. In the United States, about a billion gallons (3.8 billion liters) of fuel is consumed by idling heavy-duty truck and locomotive engines each year. Many newer semi-trucks have small auxiliary power units (APUs) to run accessories more efficiently while the truck is parked. Hybrid vehicles typically shut down their internal combustion engines while stopped, although some conventional vehicles are also including start-stop systems to shut off the engine when it would otherwise idle.

At the macro level, governments can implement strategies to reduce reliance on motorised transport, including investing in public transport and implementing transit-oriented development.

== Anti-idling legislation ==
=== Belgium ===
Idling is forbidden unless there is a specific reason to do so (version 1975-2026, art. 8.6 ), to be superseded by version 2026-09, art. 8.7

=== Canada ===
The city of Toronto enacted the first idling bylaw (No. 673-1998 Chapter 517 in the Municipal Code) in Canada in 1996 to reduce idle time to 3 minutes for vehicles and marine vessels. There are plans by the health department to ask for the bylaw to be amended to a limit of one minute and no exemptions to be made for the city's fleet, including the Toronto Transit Commission buses.

Other Canadian municipalities have followed Toronto's lead:

- Mississauga, Ontario – Idling Control By-law, 194-2009
- Oakville, Ontario – Anti-Idling Bylaw 2002-153
- Waterloo, Ontario – By-law 2009-077
- Red Deer, Alberta (2009)
- Sudbury, Ontario (Campaign only – 2010)
- Dawson Creek, British Columbia (Dawson Creek's Energy Plan – municipal fleet only)
- Vancouver, British Columbia (2006)
- Hamilton, Ontario (2007)
- Ajax, Ontario (2009)
- Ottawa, Ontario
- Vaughan, Ontario

=== Germany ===
Idling is against the law in Germany.

=== Hong Kong ===
In a bid to reduce air pollution, the Hong Kong Government enacted the Motor Vehicle Idling (Fixed Penalty) Ordinance from December 2011. The law prohibits drivers from idling for more than three minutes in any 60-minute period. Both police traffic wardens and inspectors of the Environmental Protection Department can fine offenders HK$320.

=== UK ===
Rule 123: (https://www.gov.uk/guidance/the-highway-code/general-rules-techniques-and-advice-for-all-drivers-and-riders-103-to-158)

The driver and the environment. You MUST NOT leave a parked vehicle unattended with the engine running or leave a vehicle engine running unnecessarily while that vehicle is stationary on a public road. Generally, if the vehicle is stationary and is likely to remain so for more than a couple of minutes, you should apply the parking brake and switch off the engine to reduce emissions and noise pollution. However it is permissible to leave the engine running if the vehicle is stationary in traffic or for diagnosing faults.

Under Regulation 98 of the Road Vehicles (Construction and Use) Regulations 1986 and Section 42 of the Road Traffic Act 1988, stationary idling is an official offense. (https://www.legislation.gov.uk/uksi/1986/1078/contents)

=== United States ===
Both the Department of Energy and the Environmental Protection Agency have programs in place to reduce idling. The DOE is funding research and development for alternative and advanced vehicles, which includes the gathering of quantitative data on medium-duty trucks, examining idling reduction alternatives, and the CoolCab project for semi-truck curtains and installation. The EPA's programs include the Environmental Technology Verification Program, the Smart Way Transport Partnership (freight incentives), the Model State Idling Law (diesel) and Clean School Bus USA.

All but 11 states have at least one incentive or law in place to reduce idling, while 7 states have at least four. The state of Colorado has in place a tax credit for alternative fuel and qualified idle reduction technologies, as well as the Green Truck Grant Program which allows the Governor's Energy Office to provide reimbursement of up to 25% of costs to owners of commercial trucks used in interstate commerce to reduce emissions.

There are many local ordinances and programs to discourage idling, such as ordinances limiting the minutes per hour in which a vehicle can idle. One example of a local program is Denver, Colorado's "Engines Off!" citywide anti-idling campaign, which aims to improve air quality and reduce greenhouse gas emissions by promoting voluntary behavior change in idling behavior.

== See also ==
- Idle reduction
- Revolutions per minute
