= Suzuki FR50 =

Suzuki motorcycle

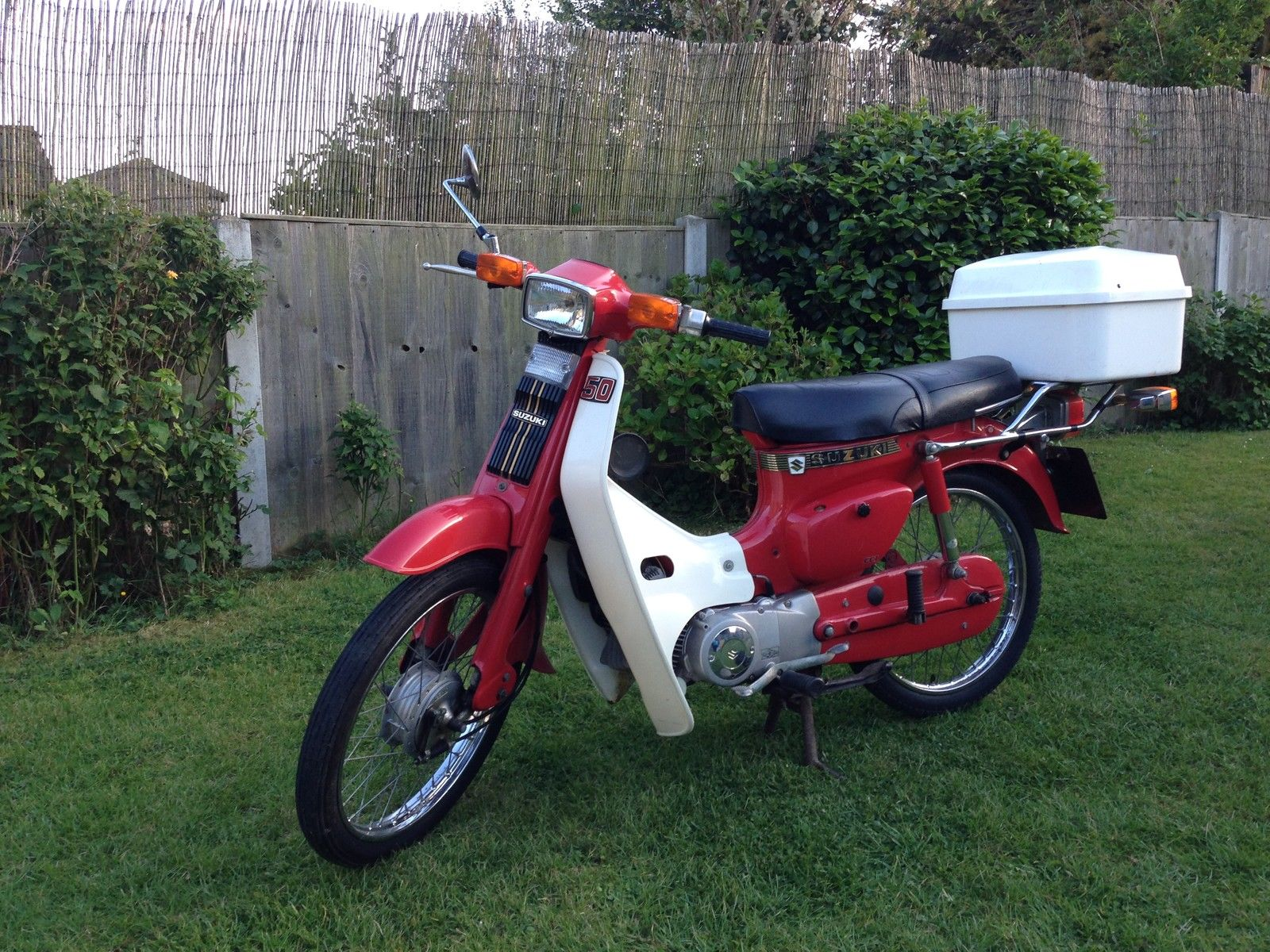
- UK 1982 Suzuki FR50
- Manufacturer: Suzuki
- Production: 1974-1982
- Class: Underbone
- Engine: 49 cc (3.0 cu in) Two-stroke, air-cooled, single
- Bore / stroke: 41.0 mm (1.61 in) x 37.8 mm (1.49 in)
- Power: 4.4 hp (3 kW; 4 PS) @ 6,000 rpm
- Torque: 5.39 Nm (0.55 kg-m) @ 5,000 rpm
- Ignition type: 6v coil/contact breaker: kick start
- Transmission: 3-speed Semi-automatic
- Suspension: Front: Leading link Rear: Swingarm twin shock absorber
- Brakes: Drum, front and rear
- Tyres: Front, 2.25-17 4PR; rear, 2.25-17 4PR
- Wheelbase: 1.18 m (3 ft 10 in)
- Dimensions: L: 1.825 m (5 ft 11.9 in); W: 0.65 m (2 ft 2 in); H: 1.05 m (3 ft 5 in)
- Weight: 163 lb (74 kg) (dry)
- Fuel capacity: 4.0 L (0.88 imp gal; 1.1 US gal)
- Oil capacity: 0.7 L (0.15 imp gal; 0.18 US gal)
- Related: Suzuki FR80

The Suzuki FR50 (スズキ・バーディー, Suzuki Bādī; Suzuki Birdie) is an underbone style motorcycle produced by Suzuki from 1974 to the early 1980s. It was very similar in design to the Suzuki FR80

It was powered by a 49 cc (3.0 cu in), two stroke, air-cooled, single-cylinder engine which incorporated a self-mixing system (the Suzuki CCI system) so it had a separate two-stroke oil tank and petrol tank. It is started by a kick start mechanism which turns over the engine. Despite being under 50cc the contemporary UK classifications designated it as a motorcycle, rather than a moped, which would have required the fitting of pedal drive.

It had a small 6V (six volt) battery fitted and an ignition switch to provide easy starting and for constant and even power to the lights and horn.

Like the FR80, the engine drives a 3-speed semi-automatic gearbox, with a heel-and-toe gear shift.

In the early 1970s Suzuki started to import the FR50, followed by the introduction of the FR 50K an improved version in 1974, then it was discontinued in August 1975. Production did not resume until February 1981 in the form of an even further improved version, the FR50 X.

The FR80 replaced the FR70 in the summer of 1976.

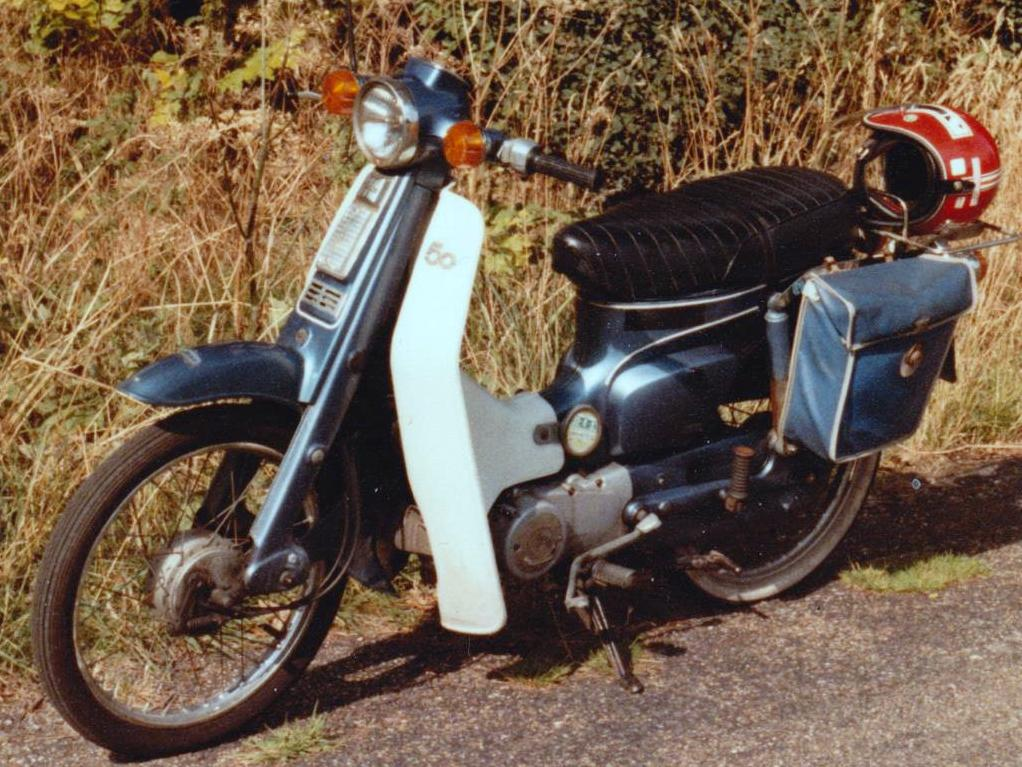
1975 Suzuki FR50
