= Suzuki FR80 =

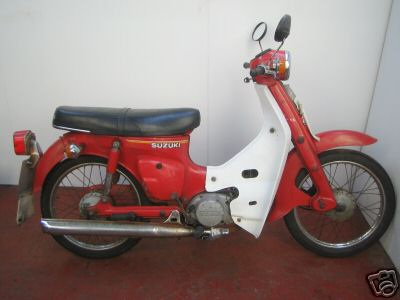
- Suzuki FR80
- Manufacturer: Suzuki
- Production: 1974-1983
- Class: Underbone
- Engine: 80 cc (4.9 cu in) 2-stroke air-cooled single
- Transmission: 3-speed semi automatic
- Suspension: Front: leading link Rear: swingarm
- Brakes: Drum
- Related: Suzuki FR50

The Suzuki FR80 (スズキ・スーパーフリー, Suzuki Sūpāfurī; Suzuki Super Free) is a step through motorcycle, very similar to the Yamaha Mate and the Honda Super Cub, that was produced by Suzuki from the early 1970s to the early 1980s.

It is powered by an 80 cc (4.9 cu in), two-stroke, air-cooled, single-cylinder engine which incorporates a self-mixing system, so it has a separate two-stroke oil tank and petrol tank. It is started by a kick start mechanism which turns over the engine.

It has a small 6 V battery fitted and an ignition switch to provide easy starting and for constant and even power to the lights and horn.

It is one of the most popular Suzuki models in Malaysia and Africa.

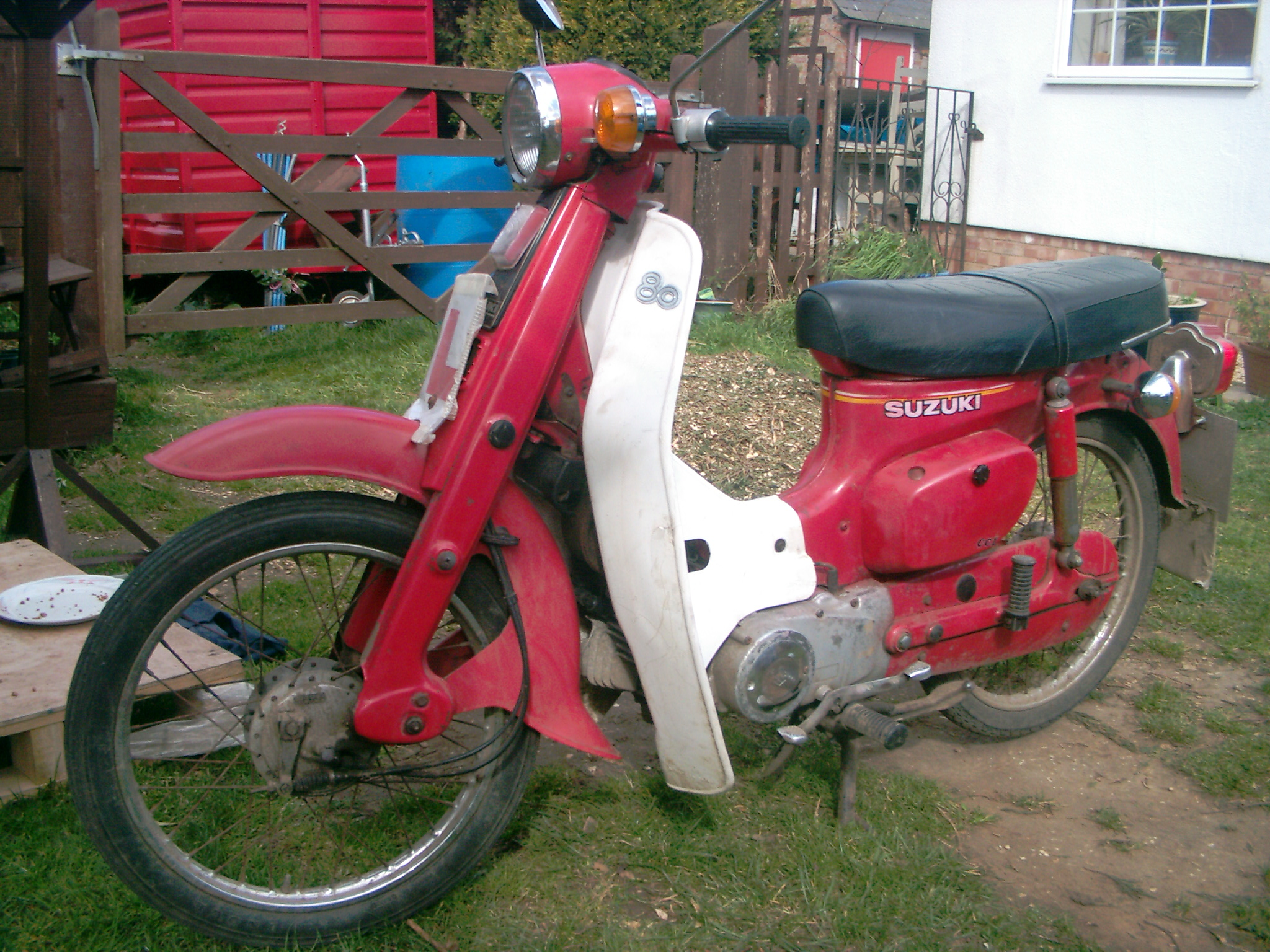
SuzukiFR80
