= Suzuki LT 230 =

Japanese all-terrain vehicle

The Suzuki Quadsport LT230S (commonly referred to as the LT230 and also the "little brother" to the LT250R) was the first sport variety all-terrain vehicle sold in 1985.

It is powered by an overhead cam 2-valve 229 cc ("230") 4-stroke single-cylinder engine. It has a 5-speed manual clutch / manual shift drive train with reverse. The final drive is by 520-pitch chain. In 1st gear (stock) the quad would go: 16.7 mph (26.9 km/h); 2nd: 21.4 mph (34.4 km/h); 3rd: 32.2 mph (51.8 km/h); 4th: 41.9 mph (67.4 km/h); and finally in 5th gear the bike would go: 51.6 mph (83.0 km/h). It features hydraulic disc brakes front and rear, and independent double A-frame front suspension. The front A-arm suspension provided 6.3in of wheel travel. The rear is a solid axle. All the shocks are preload adjustable. The LT230 features a side-kick style starter, a feature not commonly seen on any kick start bike. The LT230 weighed in at only 309 lbs. The original retail price for the 230 was $1,969. In 1987, Suzuki released a slightly altered version known as the LT230E. It featured a semi-automatic transmission that had a different shift pattern than other listed models, electric start and recoil pull-start backup. After the LT230S' discontinuation in 1988, the LT230E remained in production until 1993. Suzuki also produced, for a period of two years, the LT250S. The suspension on the LT250S is a progressive rate with more travel. The LT250S is also wider and longer. The LT250S, although meant to replace the 230, was cut from production in 1990, the second and last year of their production.
