= Suzuki LT125D =

Suzuki LT125 Quadrunner
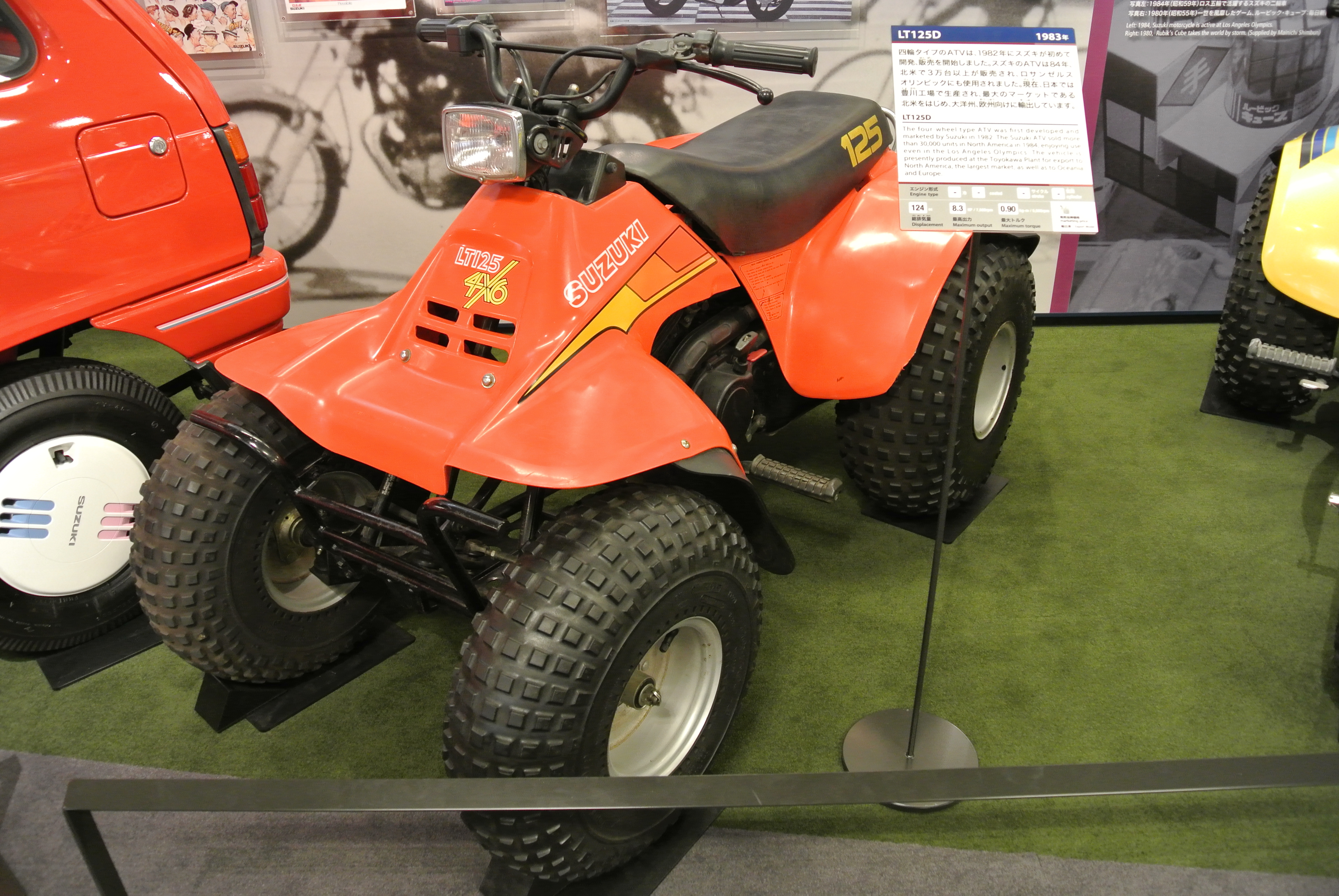
- 1983 Suzuki LT125D in the Suzuki History Museum.
- Manufacturer: Suzuki
- Also called: Suzuki QuadRunner 125
- Production: 1982–87
- Assembly: Toyokawa, Japan
- Class: Subcompact ATV
- Engine: 125 cc single-cylinder four-stroke
- Power: 8.3 kW (11.1 hp) at 7000 rpm
- Transmission: 5-speed semi-automatic with reverse
- Tyres: 20x7-8 Dunlop AT221 (F); 22x11-8 Dunlop AT221 (R)
- Wheelbase: 41"
- Dimensions: L: 64"; W: 37"; H: 38.5"

The Suzuki LT125 Quadrunner (also known as the Suzuki QuadRunner 125) was an all-terrain vehicle produced by Suzuki and developed in Whanganui, New Zealand by Rod Coleman. When it was introduced alongside the ALT125 ATC in 1982, it was the first four-wheeled ATV on the market. It had a pull start (no electric starter at all) 124 cc (7.57 cu in) engine, which had a claimed power output of 8.3 kW (11.1 hp) at 7,000 RPM. The power was transmitted to the wheels via a 5-speed semi-automatic transmission with reverse. Braking was accomplished via a single drum brake on the rear axle, with no front brakes. The LT125 also had no suspension front or rear, with all bump handling being accomplished by its low pressure tires.

1983	1984	1985	1986	1987
LT125D	LT125E	LT125F	LT125G	LT125H
