= Motor Machine Gun Service =

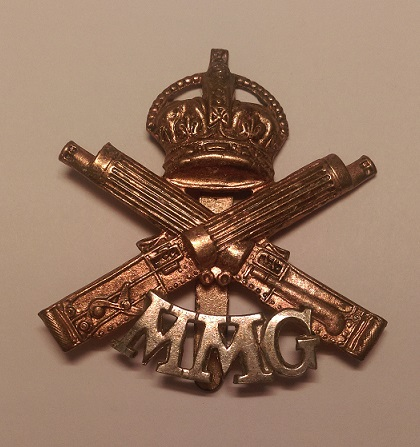
- Badge of the Motor Machine Gun Service
- Active: 1914–1915
- Country: United Kingdom
- Branch: Army
- Garrison/HQ: Bisley, Surrey

The Motor Machine Gun Service (MMGS) was a unit of the British Army in the First World War, consisting of batteries of motorcycle/sidecar combinations carrying Vickers machine guns. It was formed in 1914 and incorporated into the Machine Gun Corps in October 1915 as the Machine Gun Corps (Motors).

== History ==
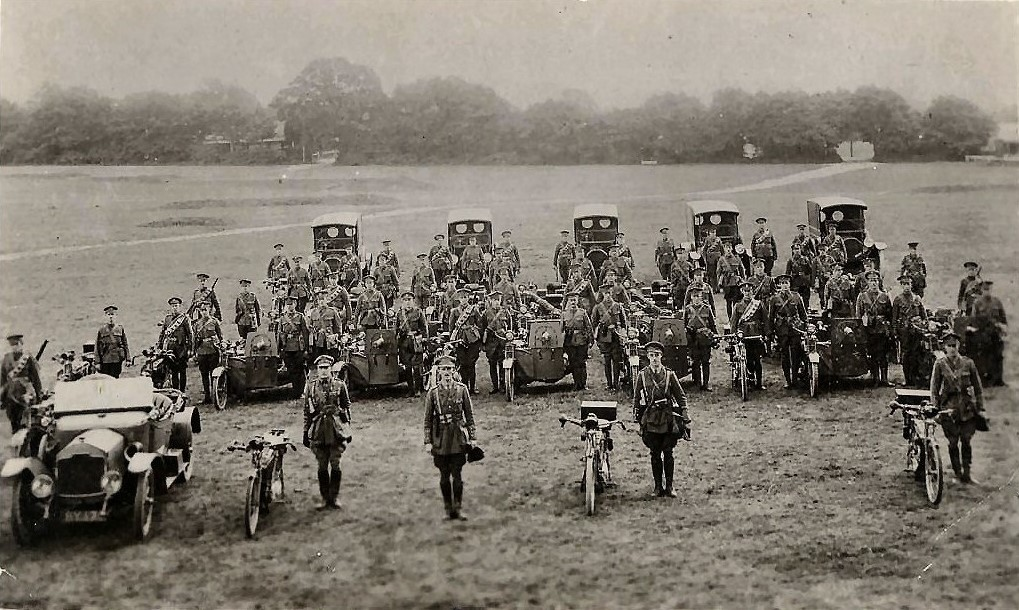
14th Battery, MMGS, photographed at Belton Park, Lincolnshire, 1915

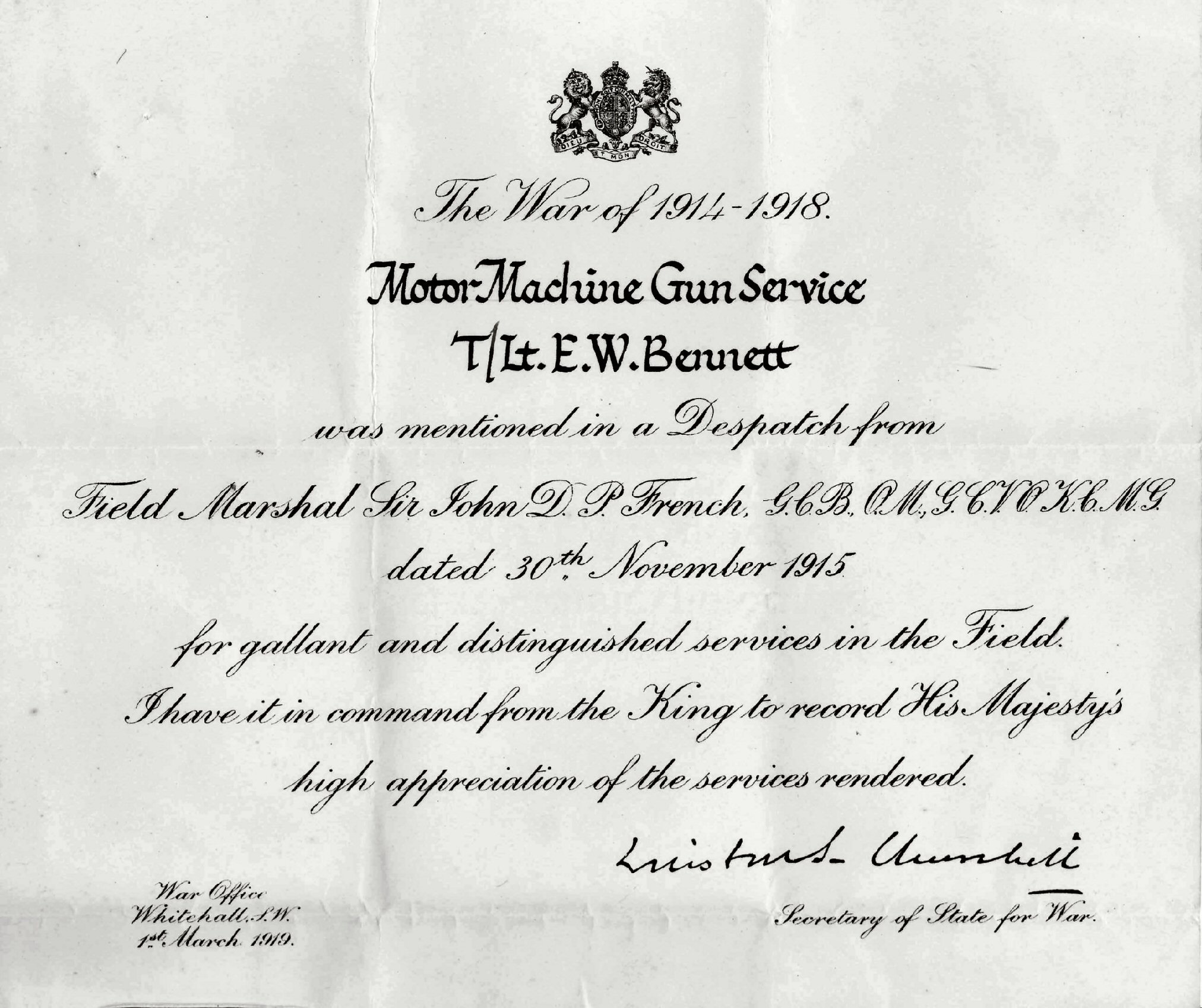
Official notice of an officer in the MMGS being "mentioned in a despatch" by Field Marshal Sir John French for gallantry at the Battle of Neuve Chapelle, March 1915

Although the usefulness of the machine gun had not been fully appreciated by the British Army before the outbreak of the Great War, it soon became apparent that highly mobile machine gun units would be of considerable value in the fluid warfare that characterised the first few weeks of the war. Accordingly, the formation of batteries of motorcycle-mounted machine guns was authorised in November 1914, under the command of Lt-Col R.W. Bradley, DSO, South Wales Borderers. These batteries were designated part of the Royal Field Artillery, one battery being allocated to the divisional artillery of each division of the British Expeditionary Force (BEF). Each battery consisted of 18 motorcycle/sidecar combinations, carrying six Vickers machine guns, ammunition and spare parts, eight motorcycles without sidecars, and two or three cars or trucks.

However, as the war became bogged down in the stalemate of trench warfare, few opportunities arose to exploit the tactical mobility of the MMGS batteries. The units did perform useful service on occasion, for example during the Battle of Neuve Chapelle (March 1915); and the MMGS received an official acknowledgement from BEF HQ in April 1915 of the "invaluable" work it had rendered in the fighting line. Nevertheless, up to that date, only seven MMGS batteries had been deployed on the Western Front. Their potential for future use continued to be acknowledged, and by the date of the Battle of Loos (September–October 1915), there were 18 MMGS batteries serving with the BEF.

== Machines and personnel ==
The motorcycle combinations used by the MMGS were originally Scotts. Royal Enfields and Clynos were also later used. Solo units were usually Triumphs. Early in 1915, following trials (the decision allegedly being taken by Winston Churchill, as First Lord of the Admiralty), the army settled on the Clyno as its standard machine for MMGS outfits. However, other marques of cycle already in service were retained. The sidecars used for both the Scott and Clyno combinations were designed in consultation with Vickers for their specific role.

Members of the service were initially recruited from motor cycle clubs and other bodies of enthusiasts, with officers seconded from other regiments.

Scott Mobile Machine Gun Unit: one machine gun, one ammunition carrier, one spare

== Dissolution and legacy ==
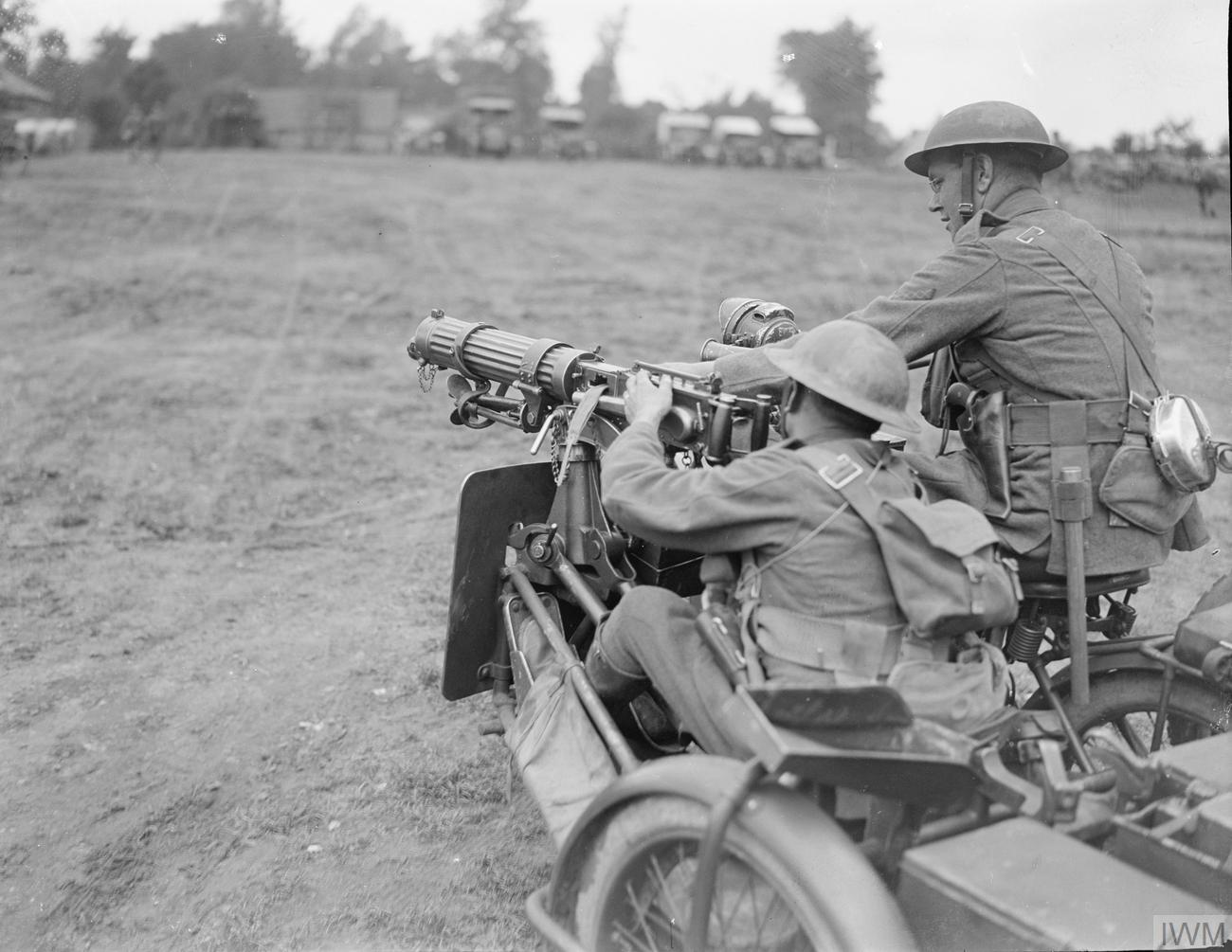
Two men of the Machine Gun Corps (Motors) and their motorcycle, June 1918

On the creation of the Machine Gun Corps in October 1915, the MMGS was incorporated into it as the Machine Gun Corps (Motors) (MGC(M)). Most MGC(M) batteries on the Western Front were disbanded in the course of 1916. Nevertheless, the surviving mobile batteries eventually came into their own during the advances of 1918, as well as in other theatres of the war, notably Palestine, Mesopotamia and East Africa. From 1916, many men of the MGC(M) were transferred to the Heavy Section, MGC, which later became the Tank Corps. In 1922, the Tank Corps absorbed all remaining units of the MGC(M).
