= Claas Mercator =

Series of combine harvesters by Claas

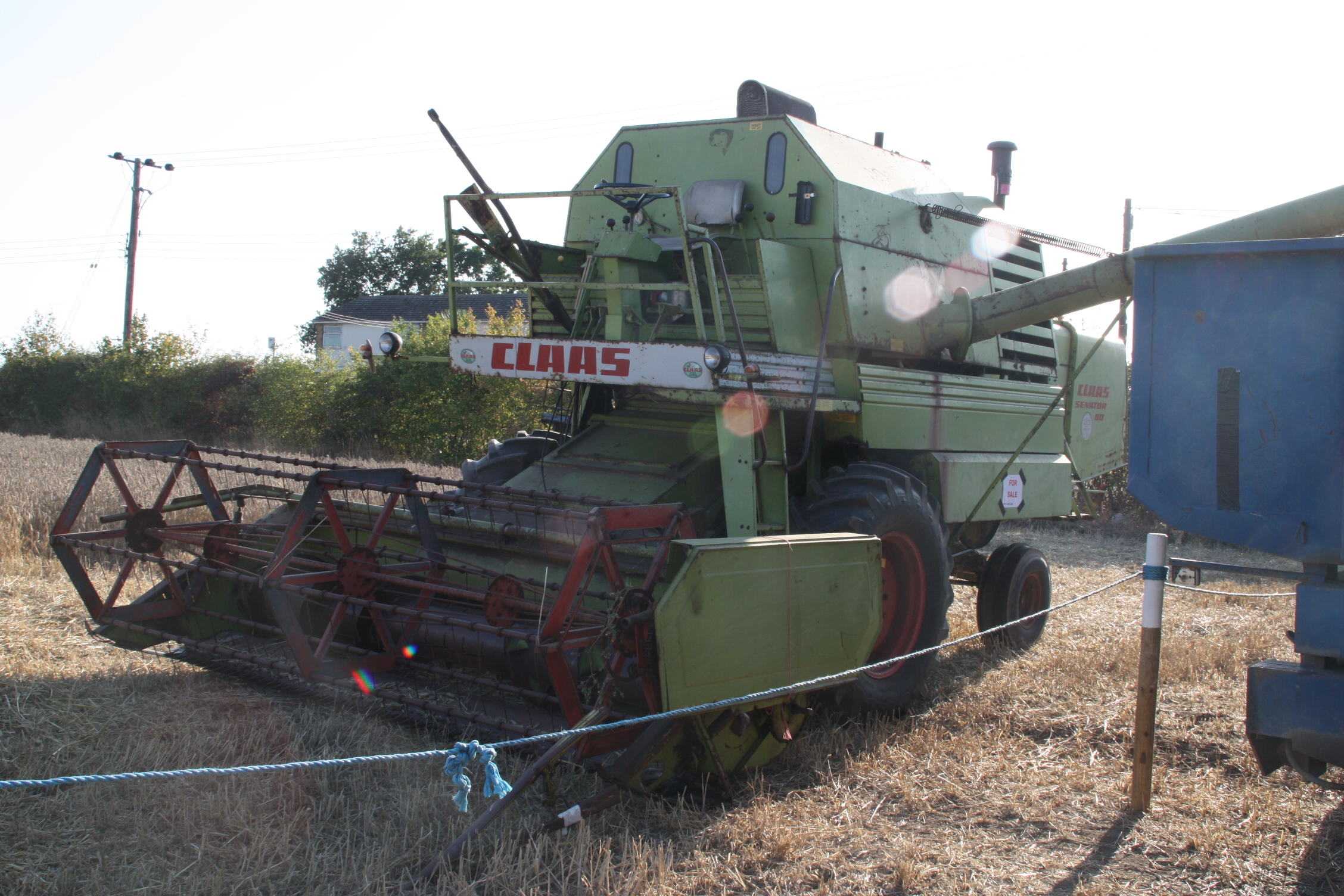
Claas Senator

The Mercator is a series of combine harvesters produced by the German agricultural company Claas in Harsewinkel. Initially called Senator, the Mercator series was introduced in 1966. The first combine harvester of the series to be called Mercator was presented in 1967, the Protector followed in 1968. Both are less productive but also less expensive models. With the Facelift, the Senator was renamed Mercator 70, while the Protector models were given the names Mercator 60 and 50. Later, more models of the Mercator series were introduced, such as the Mercator 75.

The Senator is the first Claas combine harvester to feature the colour saatengrün (German: seed-green), the new Claas-logo and extensive metal covers.

== Technical data ==
	Senator	Mercator 75	Protector
Cutter width	3 m (10 ft); 3.6 m (12 ft); 4.2 m (14 ft); 6 m (20 ft)	3.6 m (12 ft)	2.6 m (9 ft); 3 m (10 ft)
Straw walker area	4.75 m^{2} (51.1 sq ft)	4.75 m^{2} (51.1 sq ft)	4.20 m^{2} (45.2 sq ft)
Sieve area	3.2 m^{2} (34.4 sq ft)	3.2 m^{2} (34.4 sq ft)	3.15 m^{2} (33.9 sq ft)
Grain tank	3.2 m^{3} (113.0 cu ft)	3 m^{3} (105.9 cu ft)	2 m^{3} (70.6 cu ft)
Threshing drum	1,250 mm × 450 mm (4.1 ft × 1.5 ft)	1,250 mm × 450 mm (4.1 ft × 1.5 ft)	1,250 mm × 450 mm (4.1 ft × 1.5 ft)
Engine	Straight-six-Diesel, 105 PS (77.2 kW)	Straight-six-Diesel, 105 PS (77.2 kW)	Straight-four-Diesel, 72 PS (53.0 kW)
Speed range	1.8–19.5 km/h (1.1–12.1 mph)	1.5–18.5 km/h (0.9–11.5 mph)	1.1–17.8 km/h (0.7–11.1 mph)
Length	9,900 mm (32.5 ft)	9,640 mm (31.6 ft)	9,240 mm (30.3 ft)
Width	5,800 mm (19.0 ft)	5,200 mm (17.1 ft)	4,200 mm (13.8 ft)
Height	3,420 mm (11.2 ft)	3,980 mm (13.1 ft)	3,850 mm (12.6 ft)
Mass	5,930 kg (13,073.4 lb)	6,270 kg (13,823.0 lb)	5,030 kg (11,089.3 lb)
