= Clyno =

UK motorcycle and car manufacturer

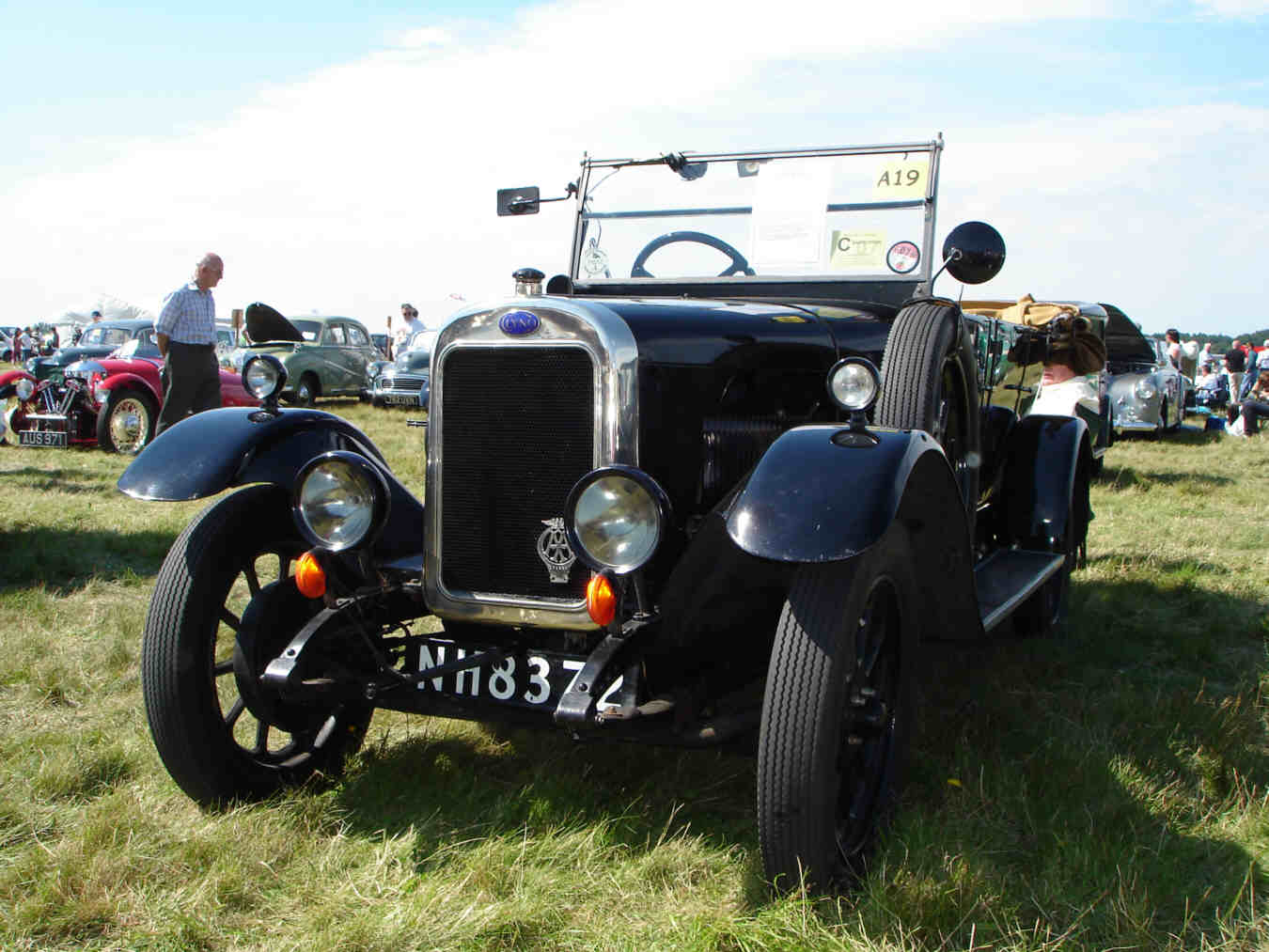
1927 Clyno 12 hp

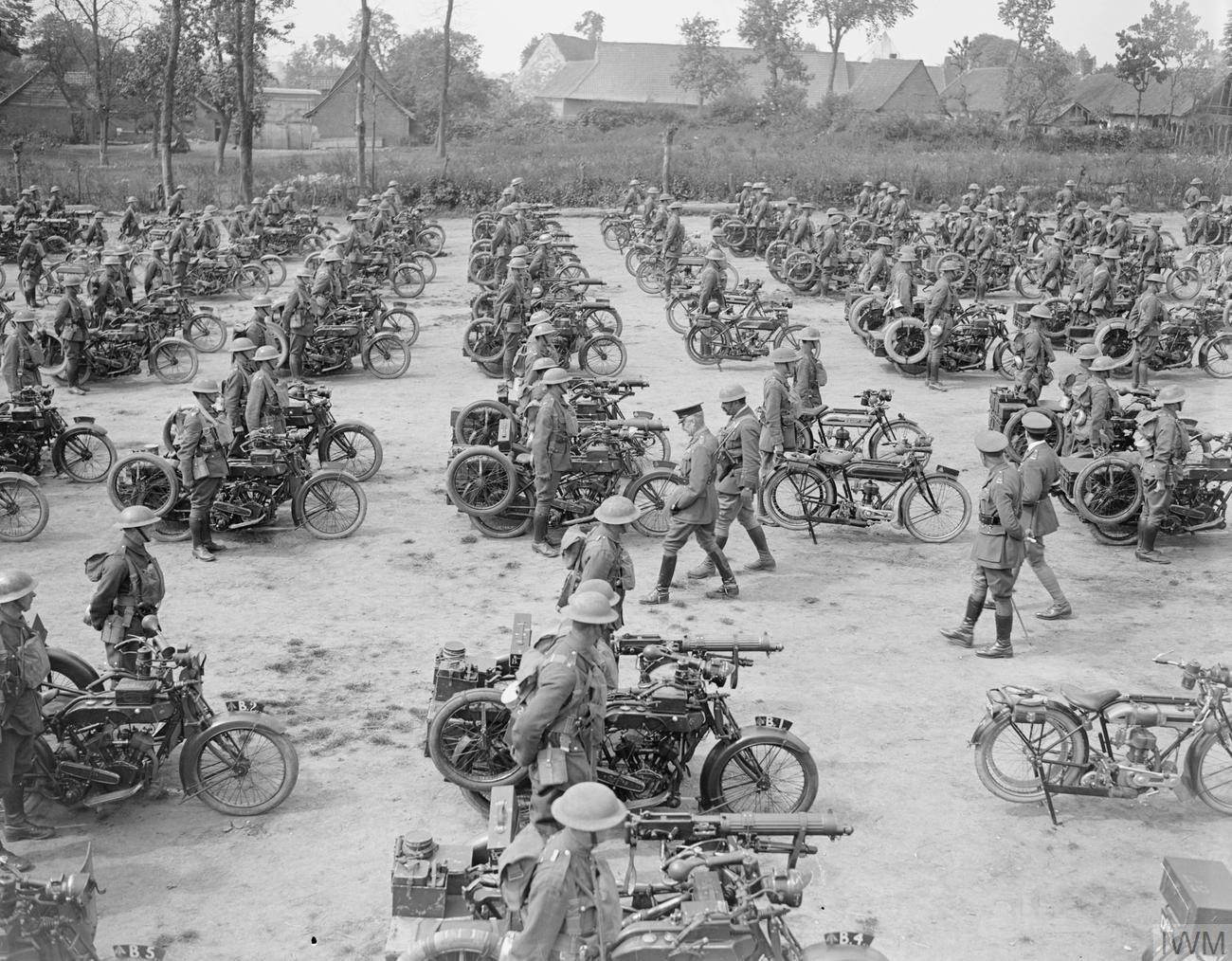
The 24th Motor Machine Gun Battalion on Clyno 744 cc twin cylinder motorcycles fitted with a sidecar and Vickers machine-guns, 12 June 1918

Clyno Engineering Company, later Clyno Engineering Company (1922) Ltd, was a motorcycle and car manufacturer that operated in Thrapston from 1909 to 1910 and then in Wolverhampton from 1910 to 1929. During this time they produced over 15,000 motorcycles and between 36,000 and 40,000 cars, at one point becoming Britain's third largest car manufacturer.

== History ==
=== Foundation ===
Clyno was founded in 1909 by the cousins Frank and Ailwyn Smith. The company took its name for the pulley designed for belt-driven machines which was known as the "inclined pully", becoming abbreviated to the "clined" and then Clyno. The cousins' original workshop was in their hometown of Thrapston, Northamptonshire.

In 1910 the opportunity arose for Clyno to purchase a factory in Wolverhampton. The factory belonged to the Stevens Brothers who had supplied engines to Clyno previously but had entered voluntary liquidation in 1910 leading them to seek a sale. The purchase by Clyno was completed on 15 October 1910 and the company transferred from Thrapston to Wolverhampton. The company exhibited for the first time at the 1910 motorcycle show at Olympia, displaying motorcycles, adjustable pulleys and telescopic stands.

Clyno continued to exhibit at every possible trials attracting attention by taking on hills previously thought unclimbable. This attention brought business to the company with orders in excess of manufacturing capacity in 1912. The same year the company took over the unoccupied Humber Limited cycle factory which was on the other side of Pelham Street from their original factory.

The company's success proved to be something of a double-edged sword as the constant pressure to perform at trials required constant development, pushing the company beyond its financial means. It was decided that the company needed to produce an affordable motorcycle which they did in 1913, releasing a 250cc motorcycle, one of the first to be sold fully ready for the road. Exhibited at the 1913 motor cycle show the model was a major success.

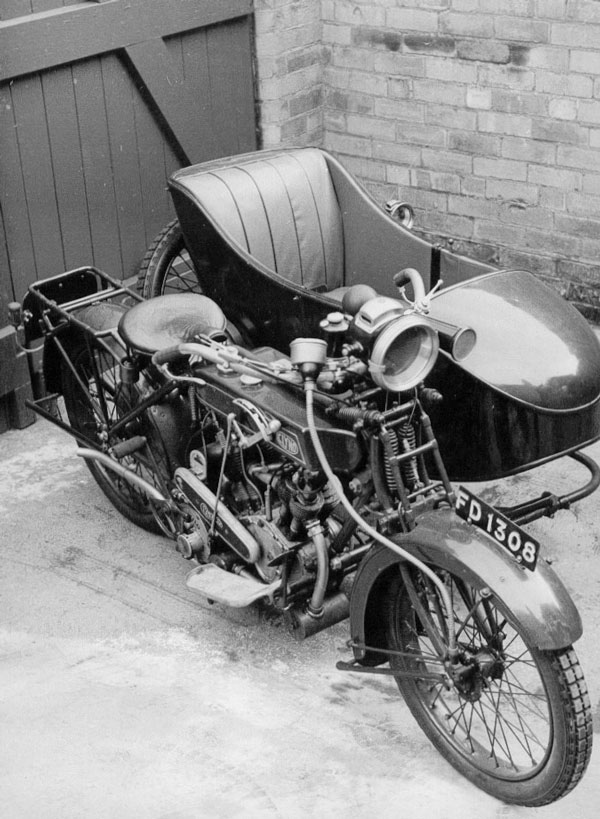
A Clyno combination motorcycle

=== The First World War ===
As with many manufacturers, the First World War was a time of prosperity for Clyno. Together with Vickers they created a motorcycle with machine gun attachment, which was produced in large numbers. The choice of Clyno over its competitors as supplier of the standard motorcycle combination outfit for the Motor Machine Gun Service was made in 1915, and is said to have been a decision taken by Winston Churchill. At the Armistice in 1918 the British armed forces had 1,792 Clyno motorcycles, 1,150 at home and 642 overseas, including 478 in France. Clyno also signed an agreement with the Russian war commission to supply their army on top of their business with the British forces.

In 1916 the relationship between Frank and Ailwyn became strained, and Ailwyn departed the company in June. Clyno continued to supply the war effort providing mobile machine gun units, ammunition carriers and building dragonfly aircraft engines. The company also designed a new motorcycle, the "Spring 8", which had a top speed of 50 mph, although it was two years before it went into production.

After the war, the motorcycle industry collapsed and Clyno's Works Manager Henry Meadows departed the company to found his own. A large number of cheap motor cycles no longer needed by the army were sold, undercutting the prices of Clyno's machines. There was also a shortage of materials with which to produce new models and to compound Clyno's problems the Russians failed to pay for the motorcycles they received during the war which led to the withdrawal of financial backing. In 1920 the Clyno Engineering Company went into liquidation.

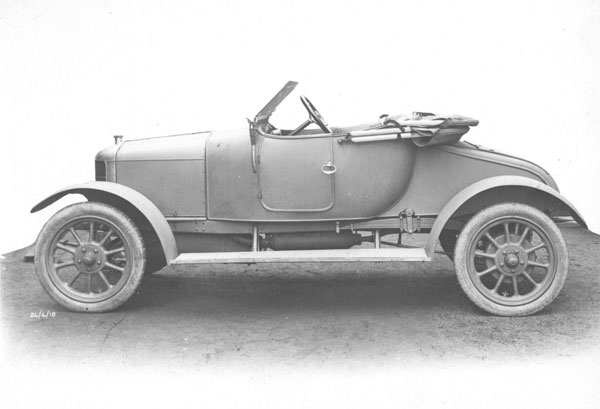
Clyno's Prototype Car

=== Rebirth and Car Business ===
In 1922 Frank Smith decided to resurrect the company under the name Clyno Engineering Company (1922) Ltd. Frank became managing director while his father William was chairman. Frank decided to focus more on car production and although motorcycle production did continue alongside car production by 1923 it had ended. The company continued its trials policy, winning two gold medals in the 1923 London to Edinburgh Trial.

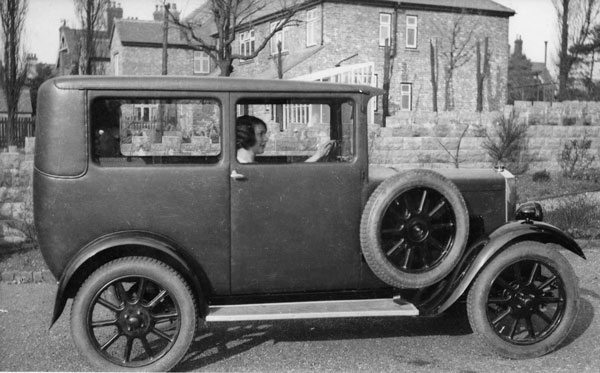
The fabric body of a Clyno motor car, 1920

Clyno debuted its first car at the 1922 motor show. The mainstay throughout their existence, the 10.8, designed by AG Booth had a 1368 cc 4-cylinder side-valve Coventry Climax model F engine fitted a Cox Atmos carburettor a 3-speed gearbox and sold for £250. Initially no differential was fitted but this was soon added. From 1926 four-wheel brakes were standardised. It was renowned for its reliability and economy. About 35,000 are thought to have been made including some sports versions and de luxe Royal models.

A slightly bigger model, the 13 (later 12/28), but still with the same 8 feet 9-inch wheelbase was introduced in 1924 using Clyno's own engine which had a 69 mm bore, 3 mm more than the 10.8 but the same 100 mm stroke. About 8,000 were made.

The company was determined to offer cheaper prices than its competitors and was rewarded by soaring sales. Between 1923 and 1924 sales increased 770% with the release of popular models such as the 'Weymann' saloon and the 'Royal 2' tourer. In October 1925 the company released their 13 hp. car which again proved to be a popular model. Clyno continued to slash prices and sales rose 260% between 1924 and 25 and by 210% between 25 and 26. At its peak in 1926 the company produced 350 cars a week, with workers operating day and night to meet demand.

At the end of 1926 Clyno launched the Cowley Saloon which sold for just £199.20. At this point Clyno were the third largest car manufacturer in the country, behind Austin and Morris, and they decided to expand their operation by opening a new plant in Bushbury and introducing two new models. The 12/35 had the engine bored out to 69.5 mm to increase the capacity to 1593 cc, presumably to cater for heavier coachwork, although most of these chassis seem to have carried fabric bodies.

=== Clyno Car Models ===
Type	Engine	Approx Production	Year	Price	Notes
Clyno 10.8, 11 and 11.9	1368 cc Coventry Model F 4-cylinder side-valve	35,000 approx	1922–28	GBP 152 (1928) Tourer	Cone clutch, separate 3-speed gearbox. Four-wheel braking option introduced in 1925. Early cars had no differential.
Clyno 12, 13 and 12/28	1496 cc 4-cylinder side-valve	8000	1923–27	GBP 215 chassis only	Clyno gearbox
Clyno 12/35	1593 cc 4-cylinder side-valve	2000	1928	GBP 157	12-volt electrics.
Clyno Nine	951 cc 4-cylinder side-valve	300	1928	GBP 145 Four-seat tourer. GBP 160 Fabric Saloon	3-speed gearbox in unit with engine. Fabric saloon.

=== Decline ===
Despite the record sales and the new Bushbury plant, Clyno's financial situation in 1927 was precarious. The company was under capitalised and had survived this far on bank loans, such as the one taken out for the purchase of the land for the Bushbury plant. Clyno's product range needed updating to keep up with their competitors but the move to Bushbury had led to a decrease in production. Despite this Clyno continued to attempt to produce cheaper models releasing the small fabric bodied 'Nine' with a 951 cc engine in 1928 with a retail price of just £160.

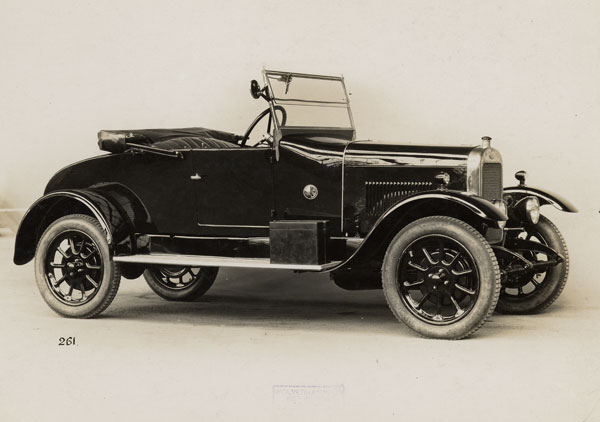
A 1928 Clyno Two-Seater motor car

In an attempt to minimise costs, Clyno ended their agreement with their long-term partner Rootes and stopped using Coventry Climax engines in favour of concentrating on the Hillman design and this hastened the demise of Clyno. The repercussions of these moves were seen in the failure of Clyno's "Century" model which effectively sounded the death knell for the company.

The development of the "Century" seemed to be part of Clyno's ongoing price war with Morris as it was announced only a week after the Morris Minor. However it proved to be a step too far and only 300 of the "Century" model were ever produced. The car was intended to sell for £112.20, a price which annoyed Clyno's new dealers as the profit margin had been completely squeezed. Critically the "Century" was deemed to be cheap and shoddy, earning the unflattering nickname, the "cemetery". The combination of the depression of the late 1920s and severe competition coming from the Austin 7 and Morris Minor led to a severe sales slump, and left the company facing the threat of liquidation.

Clyno had lost the price war with Morris, unable to offer both the value and performance that Morris could. Production costs had been pared back to the bare minimum meaning there was nowhere left to go price-wise. The failure of the "Century" destroyed Clyno's reputation which they had relied upon to get loans on order to fund their business. Without this there was little scope for improvement to Clyno's models and funds quickly began to dry up. On 11 February 1929 a receiver was appointed and in September the company was wound up, spelling the end of the company after 20 years of car production.

The company's assets were eventually acquired by Birmingham company R.H. Collier while the 'Nine' design was taken to fellow Wolverhampton manufacturer AJS by A.G. Booth.

However, their Wolverhampton factory remains in existence more than 80 years, now used by an engineering firm who have extended the building substantially.

Unfortunately, while the front of the old Stephens factory known as the "Fort Works" still exists the other side of the works known as the "Ashes" or "Tower Works" has been demolished. The plant in Bushbury has long since ceased to exist.

== See also ==
- List of car manufacturers of the United Kingdom
