= David (company) =

Spanish motor vehicle manufacturer

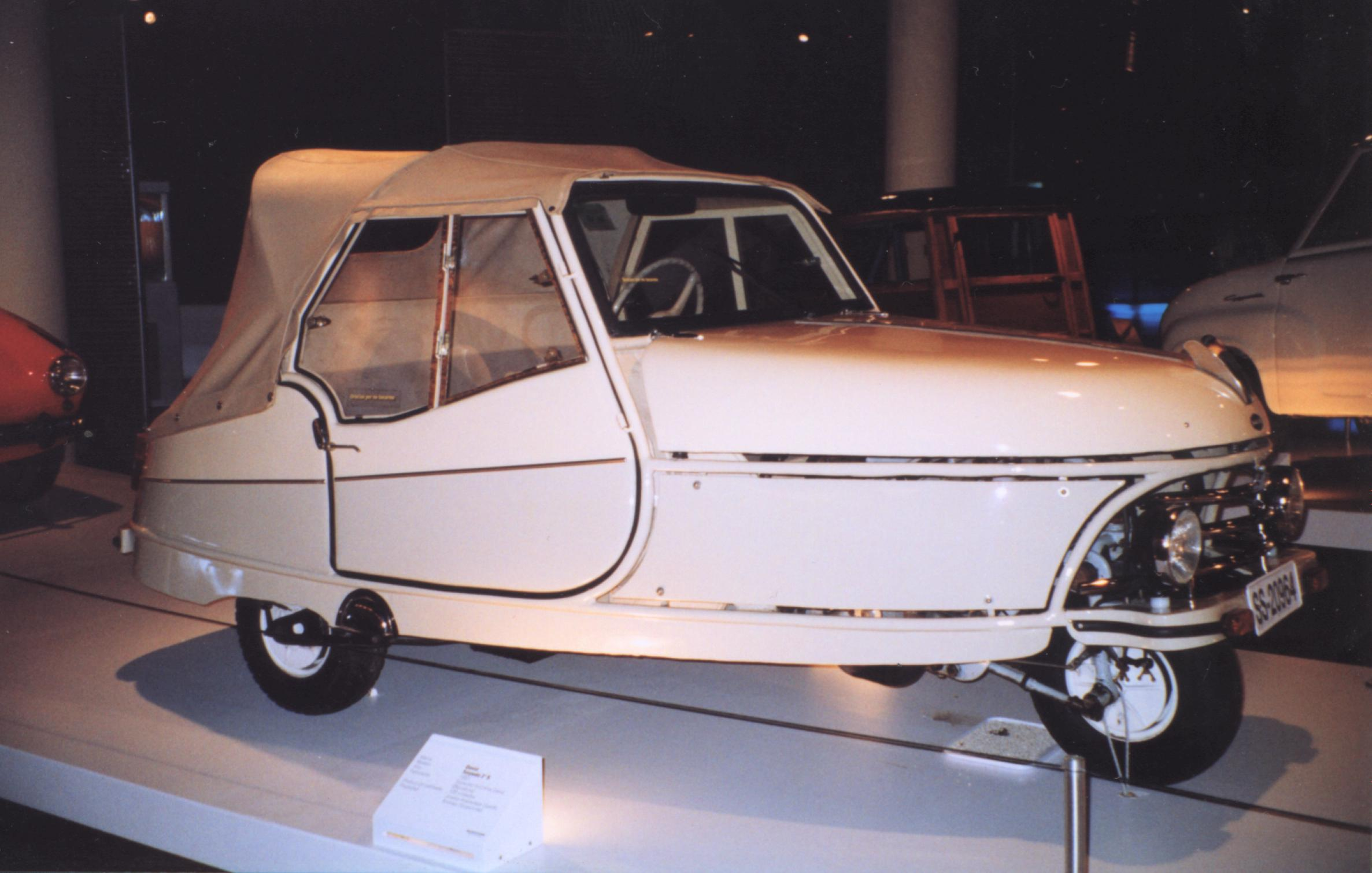
David Torpedo 2 S

David was a Spanish company manufacturing automobiles in Barcelona between 1913 and 1923 and again between 1951 and 1957.

The original cars, developed by José Maria Armangué, were cyclecars using either a single cylinder 6–8 hp, or four-cylinder 6–8 hp, or 10–12 hp engine; and belt and pulley transmission giving 16 speeds and featuring front wheel brakes. Bodies were usually open two-seater, but 3-seat and closed versions were also made. Cyclecar production seems to have stopped in 1923, but the company continued making taxi bodies for fitting on Citroën chassis, for which they were Spanish distributors.

Car production started again in 1951 with a new generation of 3-wheeler light cars powered by single-cylinder two-stroke engines of 345 cc and 3-speed gearboxes. About 75 were made.
