= Idle creep =

Default speed of a vehicle with automatic transmission

Idle creep, sometimes called idle speed or just creep is the default speed that a vehicle with an automatic transmission will move either forward or in reverse when the change lever is in D for drive or R for reverse and the foot is taken off the brake pedal but the accelerator pedal is not depressed. This behaviour is due to torque converter or clutch(es) being used in a vehicle. Creep can be faked in vehicles without those mechanisms such as transmission-less fully electric cars by automatically applying throttle when creep is needed. Manufacturers add fake creep to cars to make them feel more natural/traditional.

== See also ==
- Automatic transmission
