= Peasholm railway station =

Railway station in North Yorkshire, England

Coordinates: 54.293045°N 0.411397°W

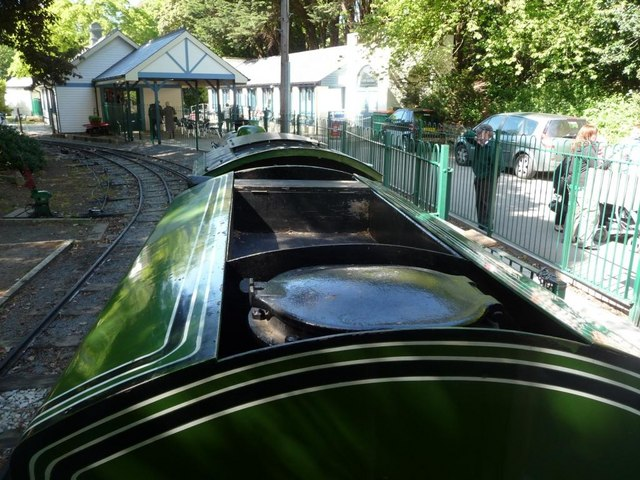
A train approaching the station

Peasholm railway station is the southern terminus station of the North Bay Railway in Scarborough, North Yorkshire, England. It opened to the public in 1931.

Although named after Peasholm Park, the station is not located in Peasholm Park, but is actually situated across Burniston Road, adjacent to the Open Air Theatre in Northstead Manor Gardens - part of the historic Manor of Northstead.

The station features a single platform with a parallel carriage siding. There is also a balloon loop, to reverse and turn engines, and an engine shed, built in 1931, and enlarged in 2007.

In 2007 the operating company announced plans to rebuild the station during the winter of 2007/2008, providing enhanced passenger and staff facilities, including an enlarged booking office and a new cafeteria. The new booking office is also a souvenir shop and sells light refreshments, which may be consumed in a covered seating area between the shop and the platform. A restaurant, operated by the railway company, is situated adjacent to the station.

Preceding station	Heritage railways	Following station
Beach towards Scalby Mills	North Bay Railway	Terminus
