= Peasholm =

Peasholm may refer to:

- Peasholm Park, in Scarborough, North Yorkshire, England
- Peasholm railway station, southern terminus station of the North Bay Railway in Scarborough, North Yorkshire, England
