= British Rail Class D2/12 =

Class of 204hp diesel-mechanical shunting locomotives

British Railways class D2/12
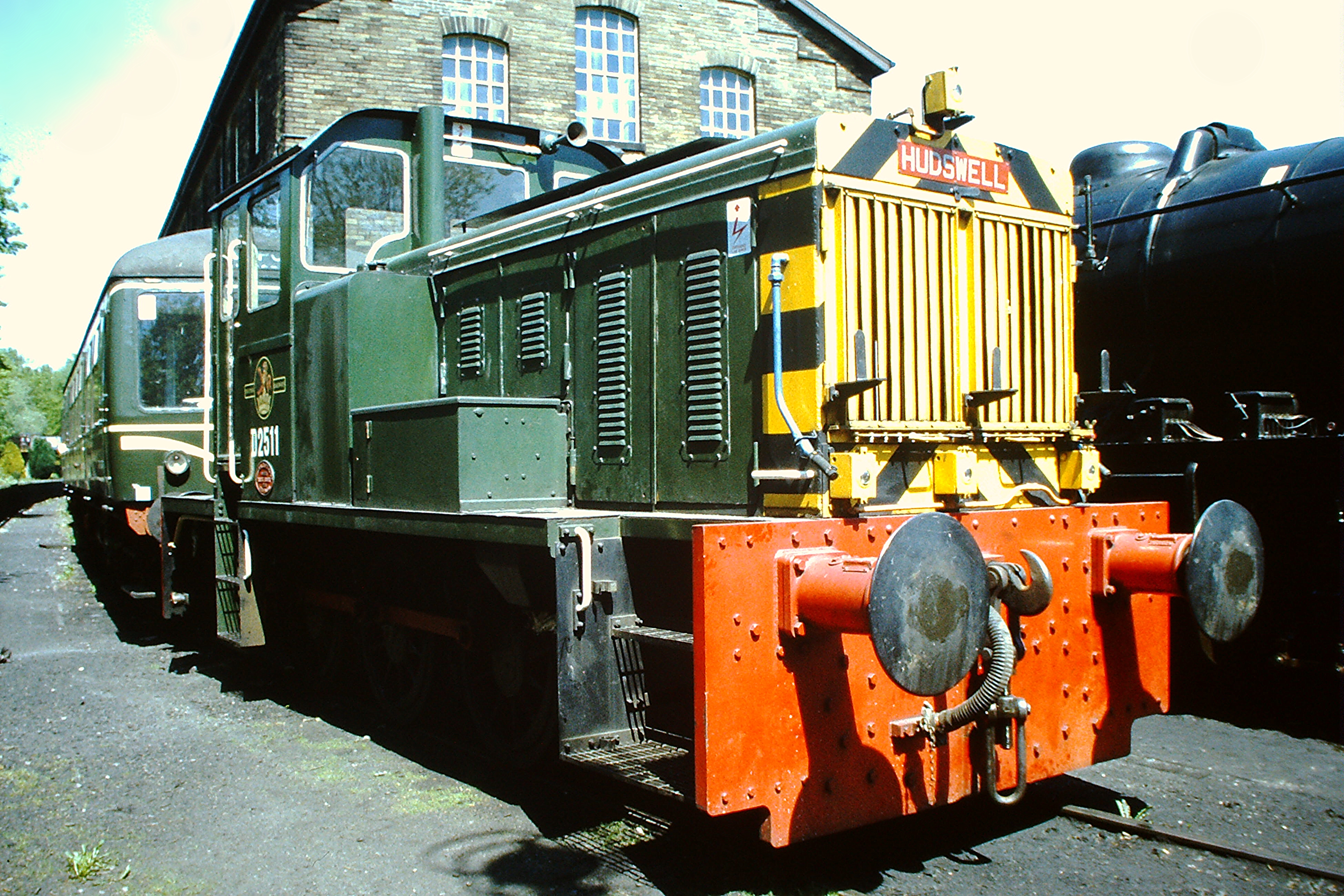
- D2511, preserved at the Keighley and Worth Valley Railway
Type and origin
- Power type: Diesel-mechanical
- Builder: Hudswell Clarke
- Serial number: D1201–D1210
- Build date: 1961
- Total produced: 10
Specifications
- Configuration
  - Whyte: 0-6-0 DM
- Gauge: 4 ft 8 1/2 in (1,435 mm) standard gauge
- Wheel diameter: 3 ft 6 in (1.067 m)
- Loco weight: 34.20 long tons (34.75 t; 38.30 short tons)
- Prime mover: Gardner 8L3
- Transmission: fluid coupling and Bostock & Bramley four-speed Power-flow SSS synchro-self-shifting gearbox
- MU working: Not fitted
- Train heating: None
Performance figures
- Maximum speed: 24 mph (39 km/h)
- Power output: Engine: 204 bhp (152 kW)
- Tractive effort: 16,100 lbf (71.6 kN)
Career
- Operators: British Railways
- Class: D2/12; later 2/14A; no TOPS class
- Numbers: D2510–D2519
- Axle load class: Route availability 4
- Retired: 1967
- Disposition: 6 scrapped, 4 sold NCB (3 scrapped, 1 preserved)

British Rail Class D2/12 was a class of ten locomotives commissioned by British Railways in England. They were diesel powered locomotives in the pre-TOPS period built by Hudswell Clarke with a Gardner engine. The mechanical transmission, using a scoop control fluid coupling and four-speed Power-flow SSS (synchro-self-shifting) gearbox, was a Hudswell Clarke speciality.

The D2/12 was mechanically similar to the earlier British Rail Class D2/7 but was of more modern appearance. The engine casing was lower, giving much better all-round visibility.

== After British Rail ==
D2519 was employed at NCB Hatfield Main, Doncaster, South Yorkshire as a shunter. It was located there until at least 1984.

D2511 is preserved at the Keighley & Worth Valley Railway.

== See also ==
- List of British Rail classes

== Sources ==
- Ian Allan ABC of British Railways Locomotives, 1966 edition, page 81
- Strickland, David C. (1982). Locomotive Directory, every single one there has ever been. Camberley, Surrey: Diesel & Electric Group. p. 41. ISBN 0-906375-10-X.
