= Georgina (locomotive) =

Steam locomotive (built 2016)

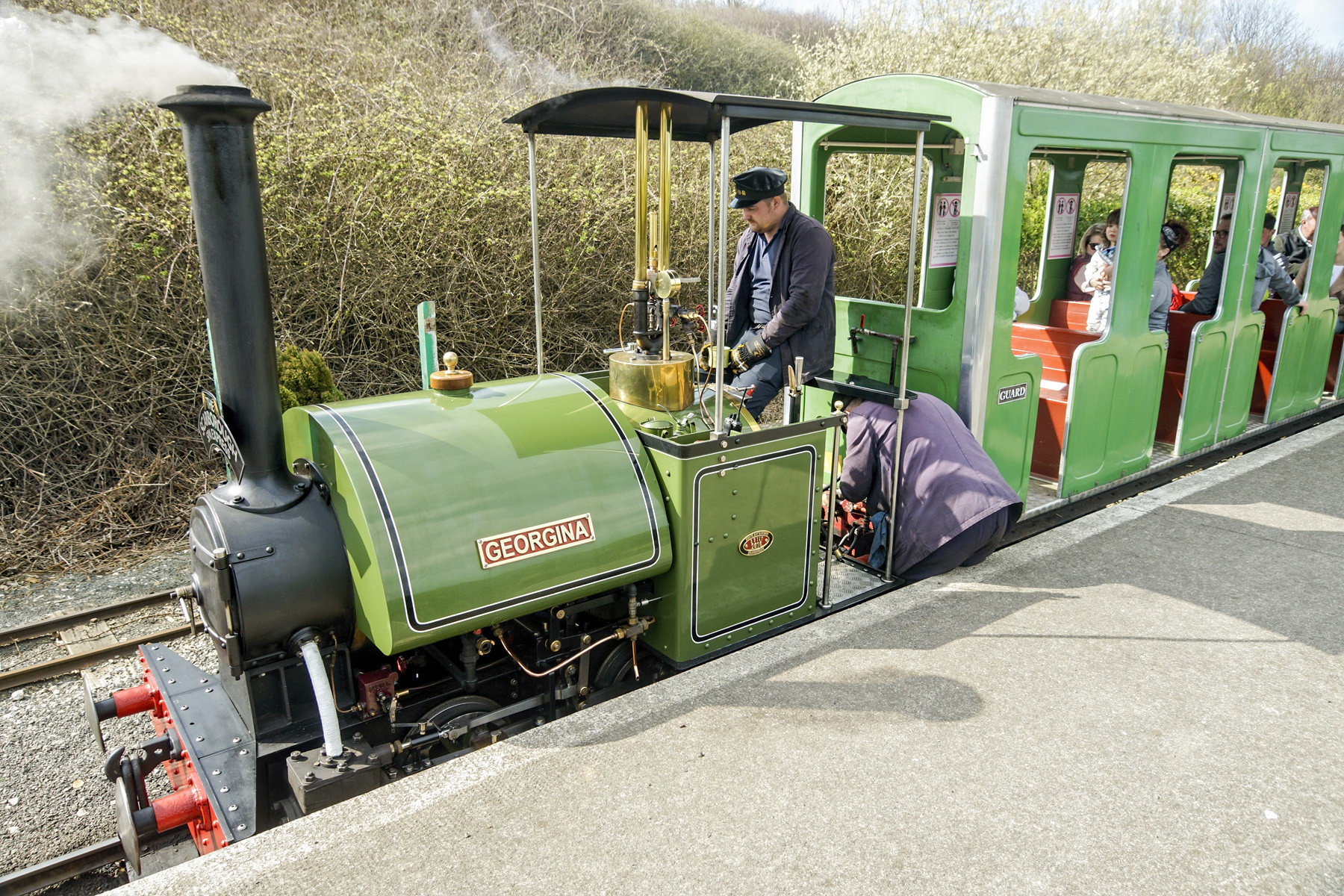
Georgina at Scalby Mills station, 2018

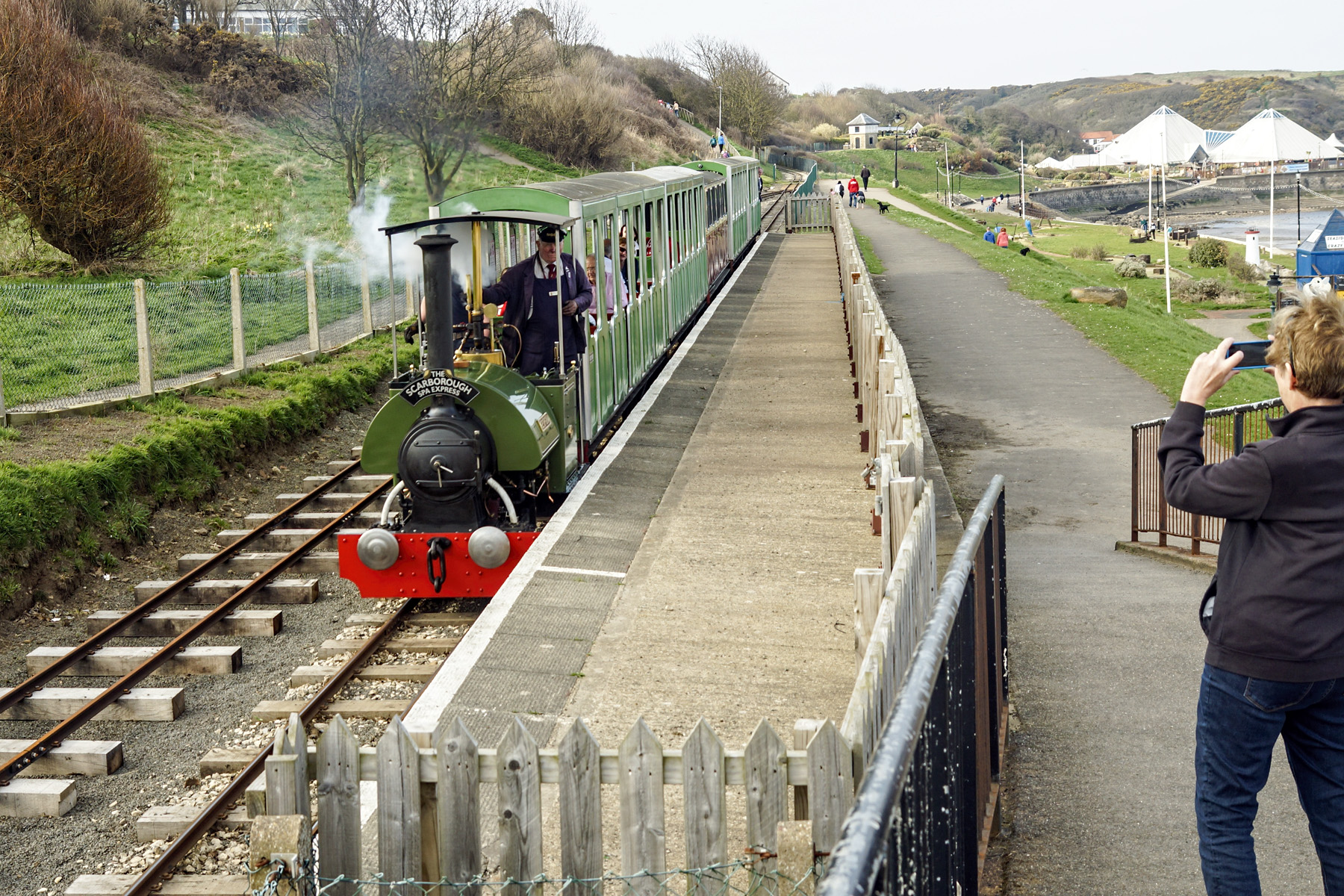
Georgina on the North Bay Railway in 2018

Georgina is a 0-4-0ST steam locomotive built by North Bay Railway Engineering Services in 2016 for the North Bay Railway in Scarborough, North Yorkshire. She was the first steam locomotive to run on the line.

== Construction ==
Georgina is based on the W. G. Bagnall's 2 ft (610 mm) gauge Sipat class and is built to the 20 in (508 mm) gauge of the North Bay Railway. The original Sipat locomotive was built for the Sipat Water Works in India.

The North Bay Railway Engineering Services built Georgina over three years, starting in 2013. She was their first complete steam locomotive.

== North Bay Railway ==
Georgina was named in a ceremony by BBC newsreader Harry Gration in March 2016. Her first passenger service was on 23 March 2016. In September 2021, the North Bay Railway was purchased by new owners who decided to put Georgina up for sale.

== The Princess Royal Class Locomotive Trust ==
In December 2021, Georgina was sold to The Princess Royal Class Locomotive Trust operating at the Midland Railway Centre.
