= Pleasure Beach Express =

1933 narrow-gauge railway at Pleasure Beach Resort

Coordinates: 53°47′25″N 3°03′20″W

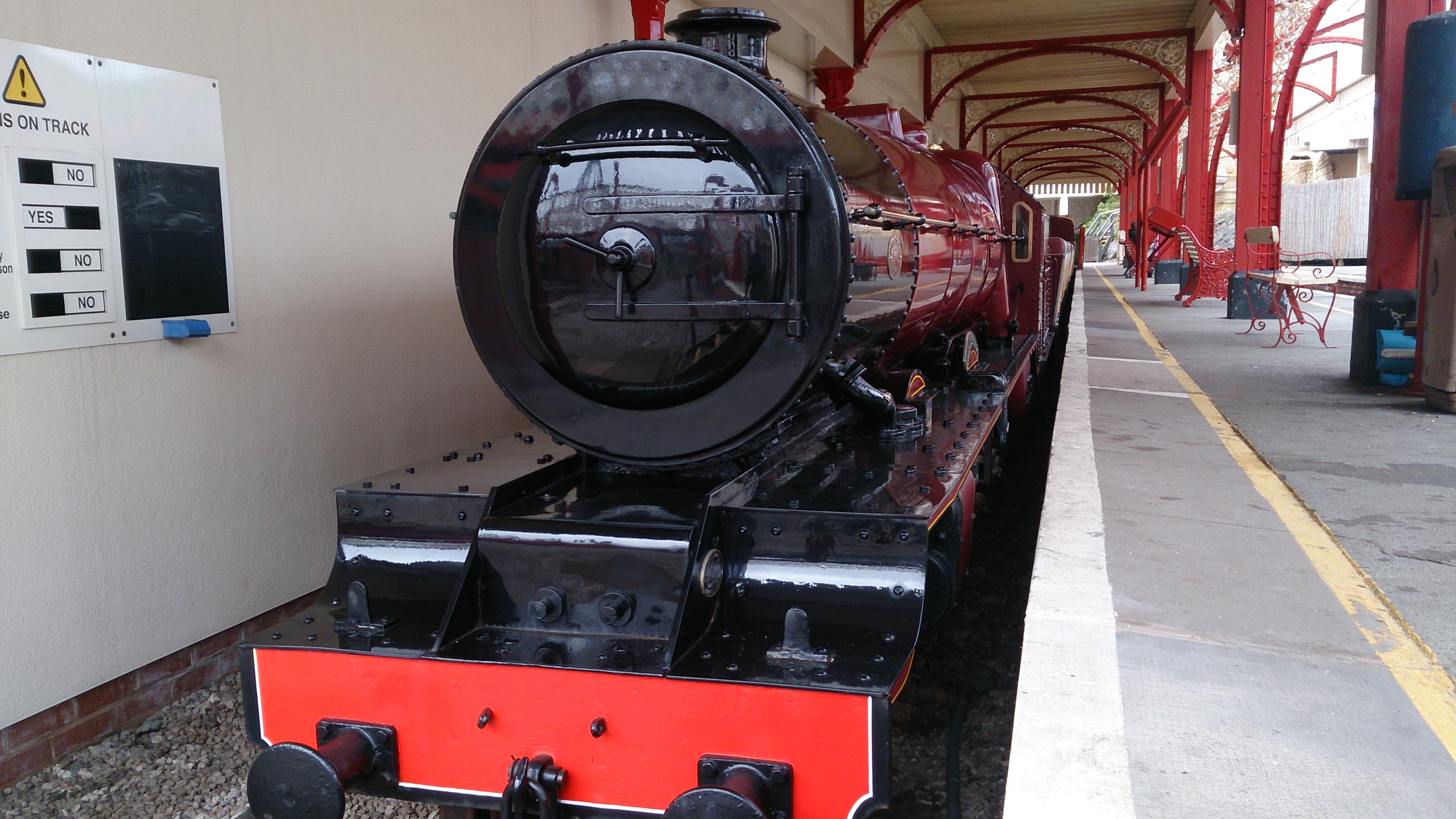

Overview
- Headquarters: Blackpool
- Locale: Lancashire, Northern England
- Dates of operation: 1933–

Technical
- Track gauge: 21 in (533 mm)

Pleasure Beach Express is a 533 mm (21 in) narrow-gauge amusement park railway attraction, built in 1933 as a tourist attraction at Pleasure Beach Resort (better known as Blackpool Pleasure Beach) in Blackpool, England.

== History ==
The main station was built in 1933, but was destroyed by fire in 1934. Redesigned by architect Joseph Emberton and rebuilt in 1935, it was replaced in 1970 by the present-day Victorian-style building.

== Operation ==
The line has two stations, Pleasure Beach Express station and Star Halt. The latter is now a request stop.

The train now runs in the opposite direction it did originally. The animal statues and figures are all facing the wrong way, and there are various signs in the tunnel mouths indicating the direction the train used to travel. Sometimes the railway runs backwards to give passengers a different view of the line.

== Locomotives ==
The original two locomotives were supplied in 1933 and were named Mary Louise and Carol Jean after the daughters of then-park owner Leonard Thompson. The third was to be named William Geoffrey after his son, but a visit to the factory building it prompted him to change its name to Princess Royal. It was renamed to Geoffrey Thompson OBE in his honour after Thompson's death in 2004. All three were built by Hudswell Clarke in Hunslet, Leeds, who had also supplied locomotives for North Bay Railway and Golden Acre Park, Leeds. They went on to build two more 4-6-2 class locomotives for Billy Butlin to use at the Empire Exhibition in Glasgow in 1938.

Name	No	Built	Wheels	Fuel/Trans	Gauge	Status	Colour	Notes
Mary Louise	4472	Hudswell Clarke in Leeds	4-6-2DH+T	Diesel (Steam Outline)	21 in (533 mm)	In traffic	Green	Sister to Neptune, Triton, and Poseidon (formerly May Thompson) on the North Bay Railway
Carol Jean	4473	Hudswell Clarke in Leeds	4-6-2DH+T	Diesel (Steam Outline)	21 in (533 mm)	In traffic	Green	Sister to Robin Hood on the North Bay Railway
Geoffrey Thompson OBE	6200	Hudswell Clarke in Leeds	4-6-2DH+T	Diesel (Steam Outline)	21 in (533 mm)	In traffic	Maroon	Was originally named Princess Royal
Barbie			0-4-0DM	Diesel	21 in (533 mm)	Track maintenance		
