= North Bay Railway =

Railway line in North Yorkshire, England

Coordinates: 54.293045°N 0.411397°W

Scarborough North Bay Railway
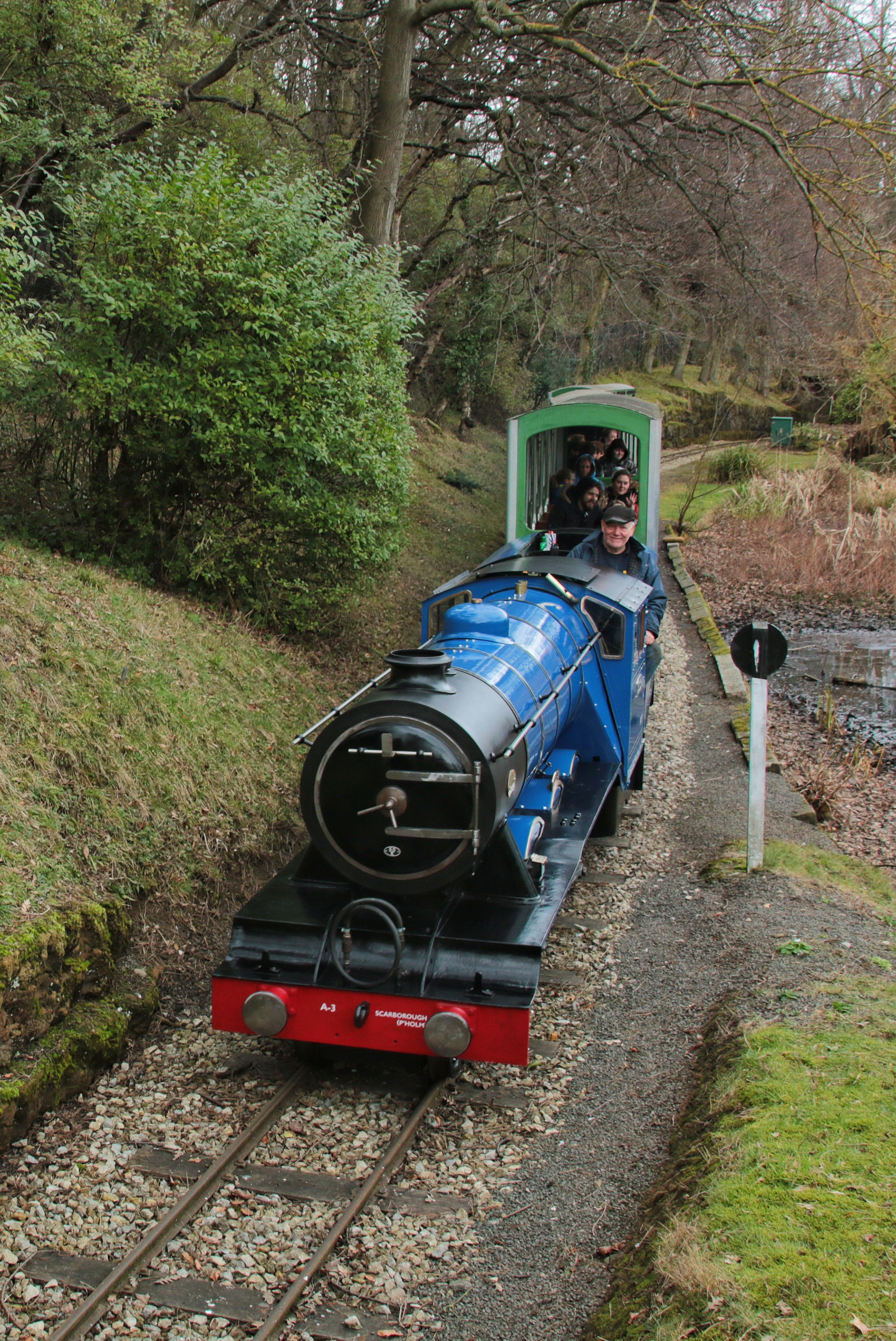
- (D582) 1933 Poseidon, approaching the tunnel, heading for Peasholm station

Service
- Type: Minimum-gauge railway
- Ridership: 100,000

History
- Opened: 1931

Technical
- Track gauge: 20 in (508 mm)

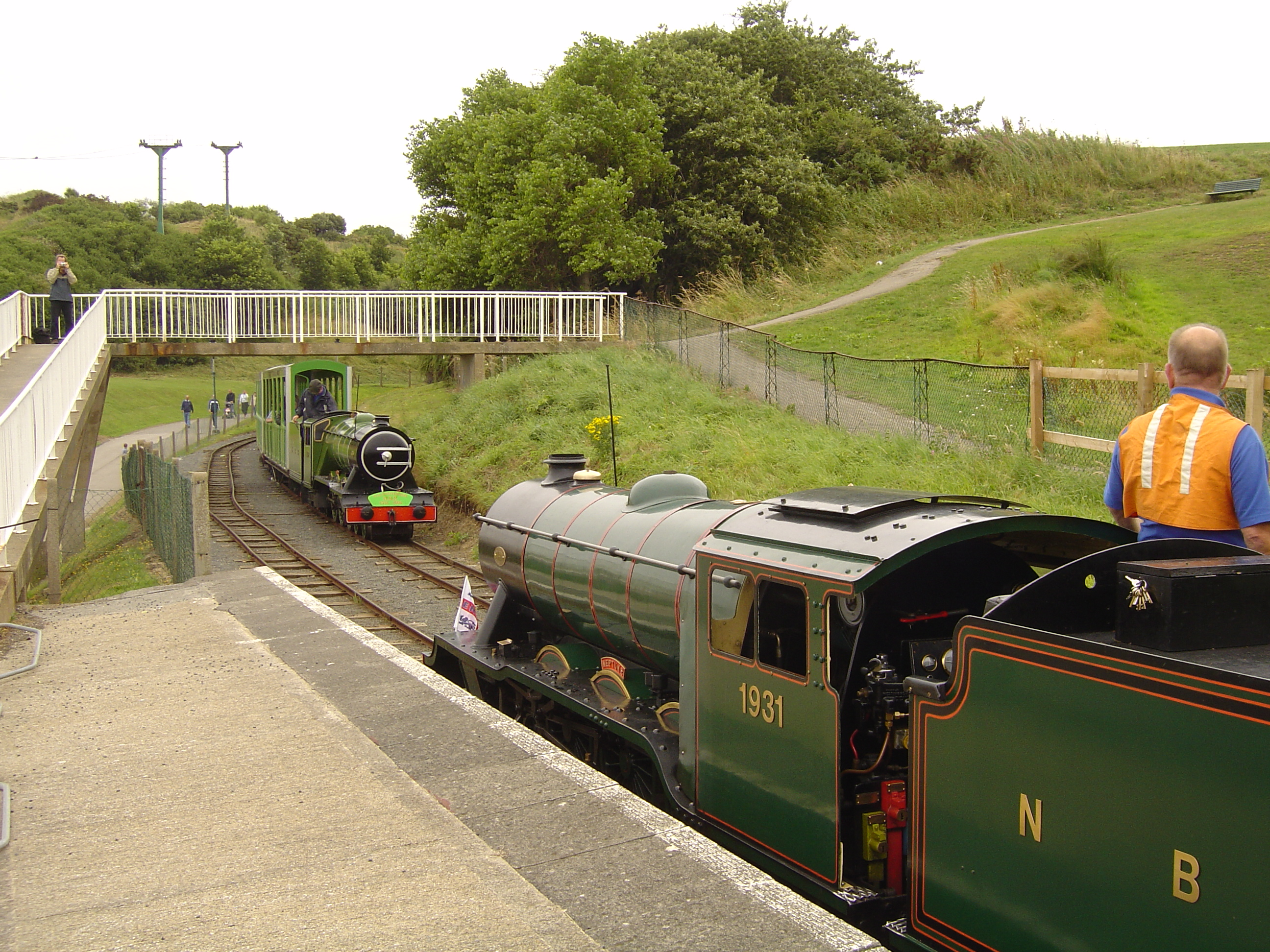
Loco 1931 Neptune passes 1932 Triton at Beach station, 3 August 2006.

Scarborough North Bay Railway (SNBR) is a ridable miniature railway (also known as a minimum-gauge railway) in Scarborough, North Yorkshire, England. It was built in 1931, to the gauge of 20 in (508 mm), and runs for approximately 7/8 mile (1.4 km) between Peasholm Park and Scalby Mills in the North Bay area of the town. The railway attracted approximately 200,000 visitors in the 2014–2015 season, and remains popular with tourists.

== History ==
Various patches of land were bought up by the Scarborough Corporation during the late 1920s and early 1930s. Originally, the railway was set further back, but its terminus at Peasholm Park was amended so that it could be seen by pedestrian traffic going to North Bay. The opening ceremony took place at 2 p.m. on Saturday 23 May 1931. The locomotive, Neptune, was officially handed over by the Chairman of the North Side Development Committee, Alderman Whitehead, to the Mayor of Scarborough, Alderman J. W. Butler, for the Entertainments Department.

Alderman Whitehead made a short presentation speech:

"On behalf of the National Union of Drivers, Engineers and others, I have to present you, the first driver of the North Bay Railway Engine, with your insignia of office, your oil can and your 'sweat rag'."

The mayor was presented with a peaked cap, an oil can (adorned with a blue ribbon), and a rag, before driving the train from Peasholm Station non-stop to Scalby Mills, at which point the engine was transferred to the other end of the train for the return journey.

During the Second World War, the railway was closed as it was in the Coastal Defence Area. The last train ran on 6 July 1940 and the railway remained closed until the Easter weekend 1945. The station nameboards at Peasholm and Scalby Mills, and the one on Peasholm signalbox were removed as security measures. The tunnel in Northstead Manor Gardens was used to store packing cases for the musical instruments belonging to the Royal Naval School of Music, which at that time was based in the Norbreck Hotel.

On 30 March 2007, operation of the line was taken over by the North Bay Railway Company Limited under the leadership of David Humphreys. Previously it had been owned and operated by Scarborough Borough Council. In April 2021, the railway was sold to Cleethorpes Coast Light Railway proprietors John Kerr and Peter Bryant.

Ahead of her concert at the Scarborough Open Air Theatre, Kylie Minogue performed the song Locomotion on some of the carriages at North Bay Railway.

On opening, the railway had over 400,000 visitors. In 2007, it was estimated that the railway had 95,000 visitors. By 2015, this had doubled to 200,000.

== Locomotives ==
All four locomotives are steam outline diesel-hydraulic locomotives are of common vintage and were constructed in the same works, Hudswell Clarke in Leeds. The first two belong to Scarborough Borough Council, have operated on the North Bay Railway since construction, and are currently leased to the operating company. The other two locomotives are directly owned by the operating company and were originally built for the railway in Golden Acre Park in Leeds; after that line's closure they were used at Morecambe, Kilverstone and Great Woburn Safari Park. They were moved to the Cleethorpes Coast Light Railway for storage before being relocated to Scarborough in December 2006.

Number	Name	Livery	Locomotive type	Wheel arrangement	Builder	Year built	In Traffic?	Notes
1931	Neptune	Brunswick Green	Diesel Hydraulic (steam outline)	4-6-2DH	Hudswell Clarke	1931	Yes	
1932	Triton	Apple Green	Diesel Hydraulic (steam outline)	4-6-2DH	Hudswell Clarke	1932	Yes	
1933	Poseidon	BR Experimental Blue	Diesel Hydraulic (steam outline)	4-6-2DH	Hudswell Clarke	1933	Yes	Previously named May Thompson.
570	Robin Hood	Metropolitan Red	Diesel Hydraulic (steam outline)	4-6-4DH	Hudswell Clarke	1932	Yes	

== Rolling Stock ==
The railway was originally equipped (in 1931) with bogie passenger coaches, with more added to the fleet in 1932, all constructed by Robert Hudson Ltd of Leeds. All ten original coach frames are still in service, although their bodywork has been rebuilt several times over. In 1960 they were rebuilt as "toast-rack" type coaches, common to that era. In 1991 several vehicles were again rebuilt, and in 1998 all ten were rebodied in fibre-glass as "semi-open saloons", having roofs and partial sides, but no doors or windows, leaving the passenger with a mix of protection from inclement weather, and experience of open-air travel. Eight of these ten still operate today (as of 2010), whilst one has been stripped back to its underframe and is used as a service vehicle and another serves as a display at Scalby Mills. In 2007 two further coaches were added to the fleet. Using frames originally built in the early 1930s for the Golden Acre Park railway (Leeds) Rail Restorations North East Limited, of Shildon, constructed two fully enclosed saloon coaches, allowing bad weather transport of passengers in comfort.

There are also freight or service vehicles on the line including a bogie flat (converted from one of the original passenger coaches), a four-wheel hopper wagon, a bogie parcels van as a mobile P-Way store and mess and two four-wheel mine car frames serving as a boiler caddy and small flat wagon for P-Way tools.

== Stations ==
There are three stations on the line:

- Peasholm – single platform terminus at the Burniston Road entrance to Northstead Manor Gardens.
- Beach – two staggered platforms with passing loop. Currently disused, was a temporary terminus during the construction of the Yorkshire Water pumping station and Scarborough Sealife Centre.
- Scalby Mills – island platform terminus serving Scarborough Sealife Centre. Engine release by turntable (formerly balloon loop partially in tunnel).

== Accidents ==
On 10 July 1932, during the second operating season of the line, a head-on collision took place at Beach station, in which the engine driver, Herbert Carr, aged 25, was killed and 31 passengers were injured. A second head-on collision took place on Monday 23 August 1948 and although 9 people were injured, this time there were no fatalities.
