= Northstead =

Area of Scarborough in North Yorkshire, England

Coordinates: 54.2905°N 0.4100°W

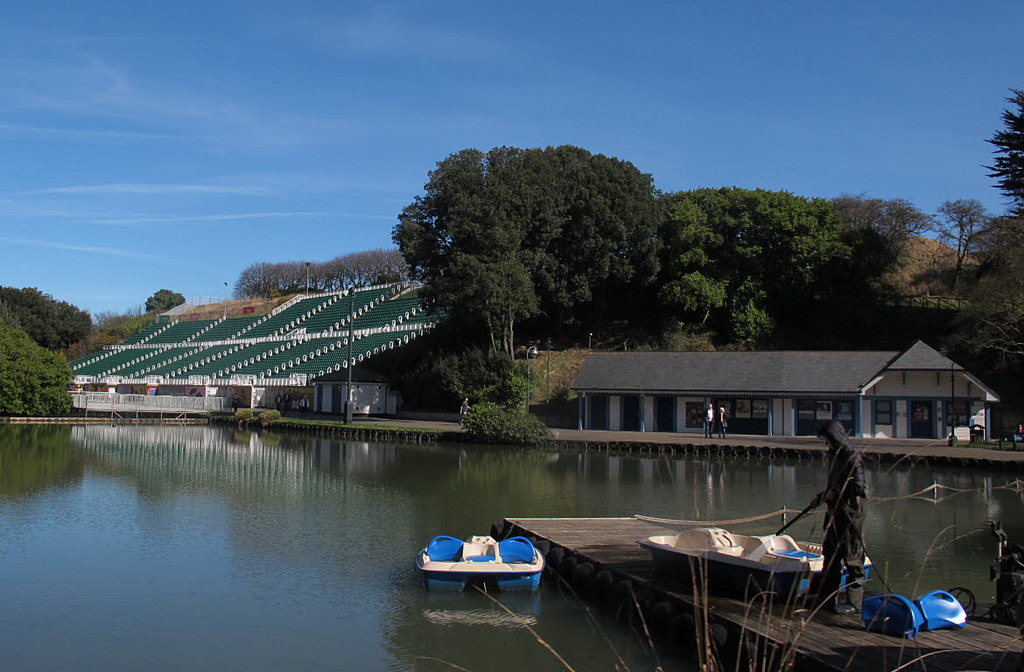
The open air theatre

Northstead is an area on the North Bay of Scarborough in North Yorkshire, England. The area near Newlands and Barrowcliff includes Peasholm Park and Scarborough Open Air Theatre.

In 2011, the namesake ward had a population of 4,038. Since 2019 the ward no longer covers the area, with most of the old ward now in the Woodlands ward.

== History ==
The Manor of Northstead consisted of a medieval manor house surrounded by fields and farms in the parish of Scalby in the North Riding of Yorkshire. The estate originally bordered the northern side of the ancient boundary of the Borough of Scarborough, following the line of Peasholm Beck. The estate passed into the ownership of the Crown during the reign of King Richard III (1483–1485). By 1600, the manor house had fallen into disrepair, being latterly occupied by Sir Richard Cholmeley's shepherd until it finally collapsed.

The land, but not the lordship of the manor, was bought from the Crown by the Scarborough Corporation in 1921. The manor house for the former estate no longer exists and the land has since been redeveloped as part of modern-day Scarborough. The site of the manor house is believed to have been covered by the lake in Peasholm Park, a municipal park opened in 1912.

== Politics ==
The ancient title of the Crown Steward and Bailiff of the Manor of Northstead persisted beyond the manor, however, being used since the 19th century as a sinecure post which plays a role in the procedure for effecting an MP's resignation from the House of Commons of the United Kingdom.

By virtue of the fact that it became and was retained as a Lordship of the Crown beyond the sale and eventual disappearance of the estate, since the 19th century the post of Crown Steward and Bailiff of the Manor of Northstead has played a role in the procedure for effecting resignation from the House of Commons of the United Kingdom by Members of Parliament (MPs). While no longer having any actual role or responsibility, it remains a nominal paid office of the Crown, a sort of sinecure, appointment to which is one of the things which by law disqualifies an MP from the House. This principle goes back to the Act of Settlement 1701, and is now regulated by the House of Commons Disqualification Act 1975. Since 1623, MPs have not been permitted to resign their seats directly. Although several such offices have been used for this purpose in the past, in the present day only two are used: the Northstead post and that of Crown Steward and Bailiff of the three Chiltern Hundreds of Stoke, Desborough and Burnham.

Most references say that the Northstead post was first used in this way on 20 March 1844 to allow Sir George Henry Rose, Member for Christchurch, to resign his seat. But the official book recording appointments to the various stewardships (lodged in The National Archives under catalogue reference E 197/1) indicates that Patrick Chalmers, MP for Montrose Burghs, was appointed Steward of the Manor of Northstead on 6 April 1842. The writ of election for a replacement was moved as if Chalmers had been appointed to the Chiltern Hundreds.

Appointments to the posts are made by the Chancellor of the Exchequer. Using two posts allows more than one MP to resign simultaneously, although more commonly, single resignations are effected by alternating appointments to the Northstead and Chiltern Hundreds offices.

Sinn Féin MP Gerry Adams was appointed to the post after announcing his intention to resign from the UK Parliament to stand in the 2011 Irish general election. Adams denied that he had accepted the appointment, which would conflict with Sinn Féin's longstanding policy of refusing to pledge allegiance to the British Crown. It was later clarified in Parliament that Adams had not "accepted" the post, but had been appointed to it on announcing his desire to resign as an MP.

One of the MPs to be appointed to the Northstead office was former Prime Minister David Cameron, who announced his decision to resign from his parliamentary seat of Witney on 12 September 2016.

== See also ==
- The Manor of Northstead, a play
