= Beach railway station (England) =

Railway station in North Yorkshire, England

Coordinates: 54.297607°N 0.410413°W

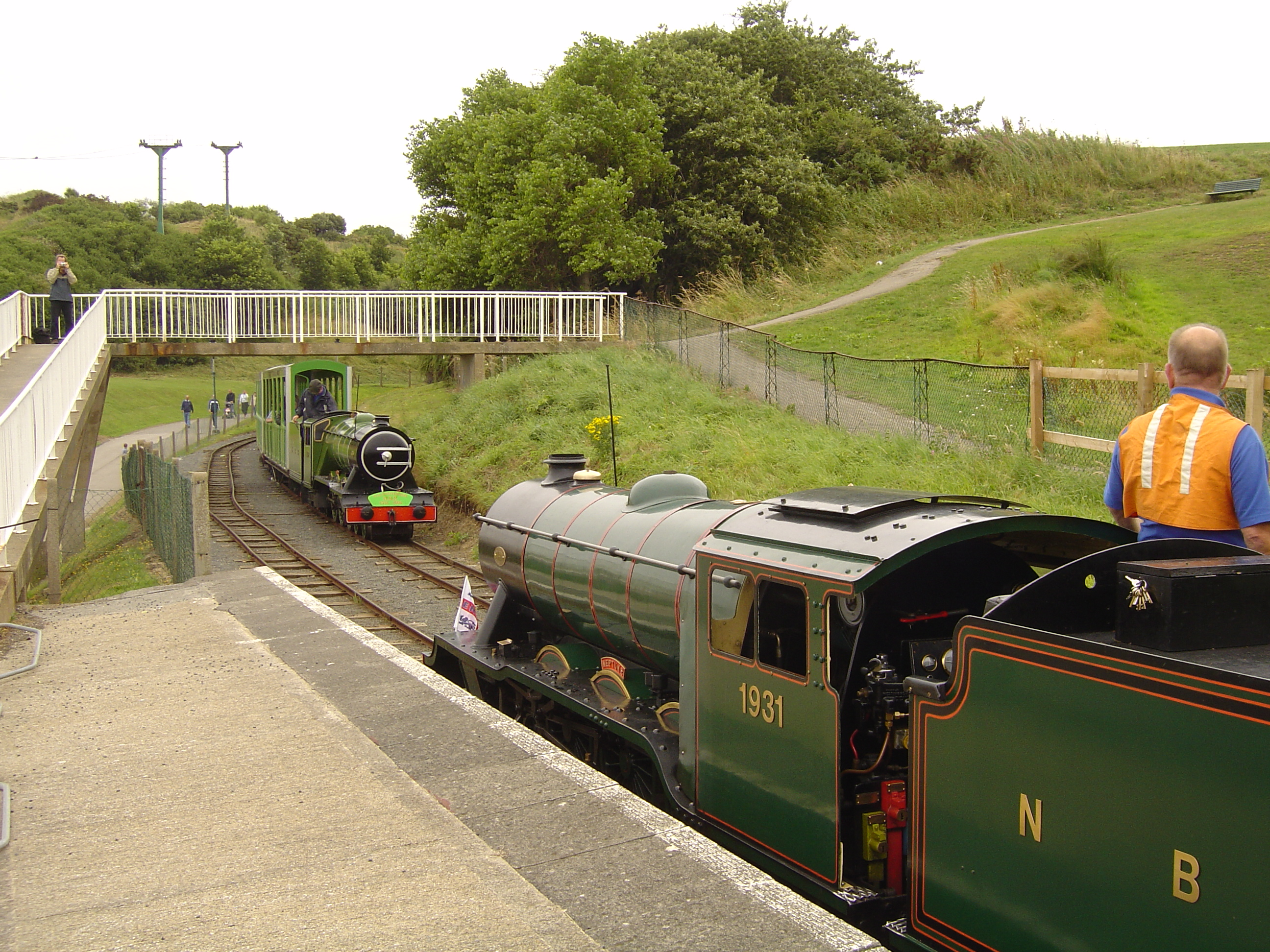
Trains passing the disused platform at Beach, 3 August 2006.

Beach railway station was a railway station in Scarborough, North Yorkshire, England, built in 1931.

The station was an intermediate station on Scarborough North Bay Railway, a miniature railway built to carry tourists from Peasholm Park to Scalby Mills. Although the station was built in 1931, it was not used by passengers until the late 1980s/early 1990s, when it was used as a temporary terminus during the closure of Scalby Mills, due to rebuilding work in conjunction with Scarborough Sealife Centre.

The station is now closed again, although the platforms are still extant. Service trains regularly wait on the sidings, as it is a passing loop on the single line railway.

| Preceding station | Heritage railways | Following station |
|---|---|---|
| Scalby Mills Terminus | North Bay Railway | Peasholm Terminus |
