= Scalby Mills railway station =

Railway station in North Yorkshire, England

Coordinates: 54.300889°N 0.410890°W

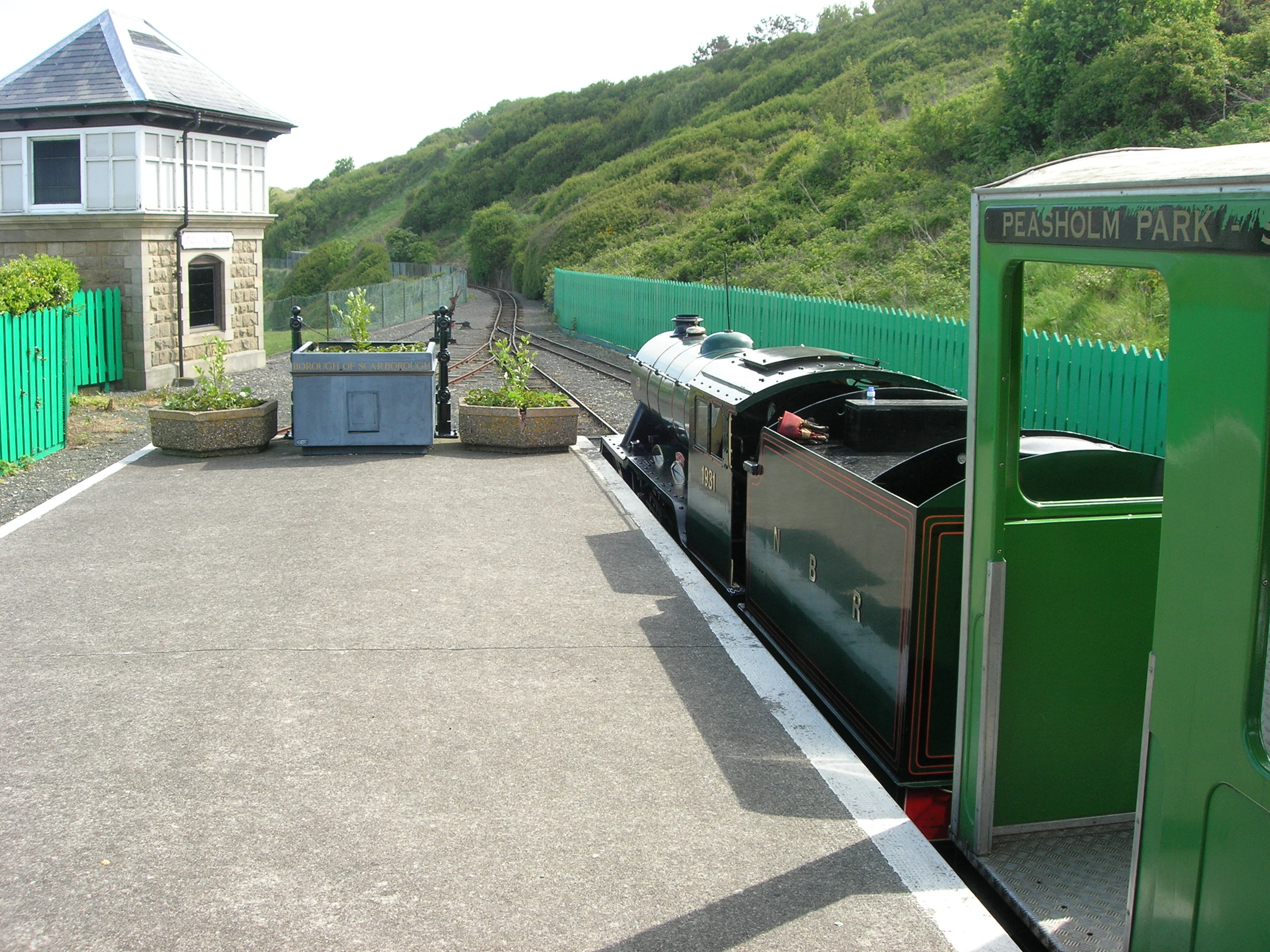
Locomotive 1931 'Neptune' awaits departure from Scalby Mills on a passenger train in June 2006. All three lines, the island platform, and the signal box may be seen in this view.

Scalby Mills railway station is the northern terminus of the North Bay Railway in Scarborough, North Yorkshire, England. It opened to the public in 1931.

The station has operated continuously as the northern terminus except briefly during the construction of the Scarborough Sealife Centre, when the preceding Beach station formed a temporary terminus.

The station features two platforms, either side of a single island platform concourse, together with a run-round (loco-release) track. These three lines meet at the southern end of the station in a series of points, whilst at the northern end they merge at a turntable, which is also the headshunt for locomotive release.

The station features a signal box, which is currently in use as a general storage facility. There is also a booking office at the turntable end of the station. There are plans to develop a small museum and exhibition centre at the station, outlining the history of the railway for visitors.

Preceding station	Heritage railways	Following station
Terminus	North Bay Railway	Beach towards Peasholm
