= Hudswell Clarke =

Rolling stock manufacturer

Hudswell, Clarke and Company Limited
- Industry: Railway Equipment
- Founded: 1860; 166 years ago in Leeds, United Kingdom
- Defunct: 1972
- Fate: Absorbed
- Successor: Hunslet Engine Company

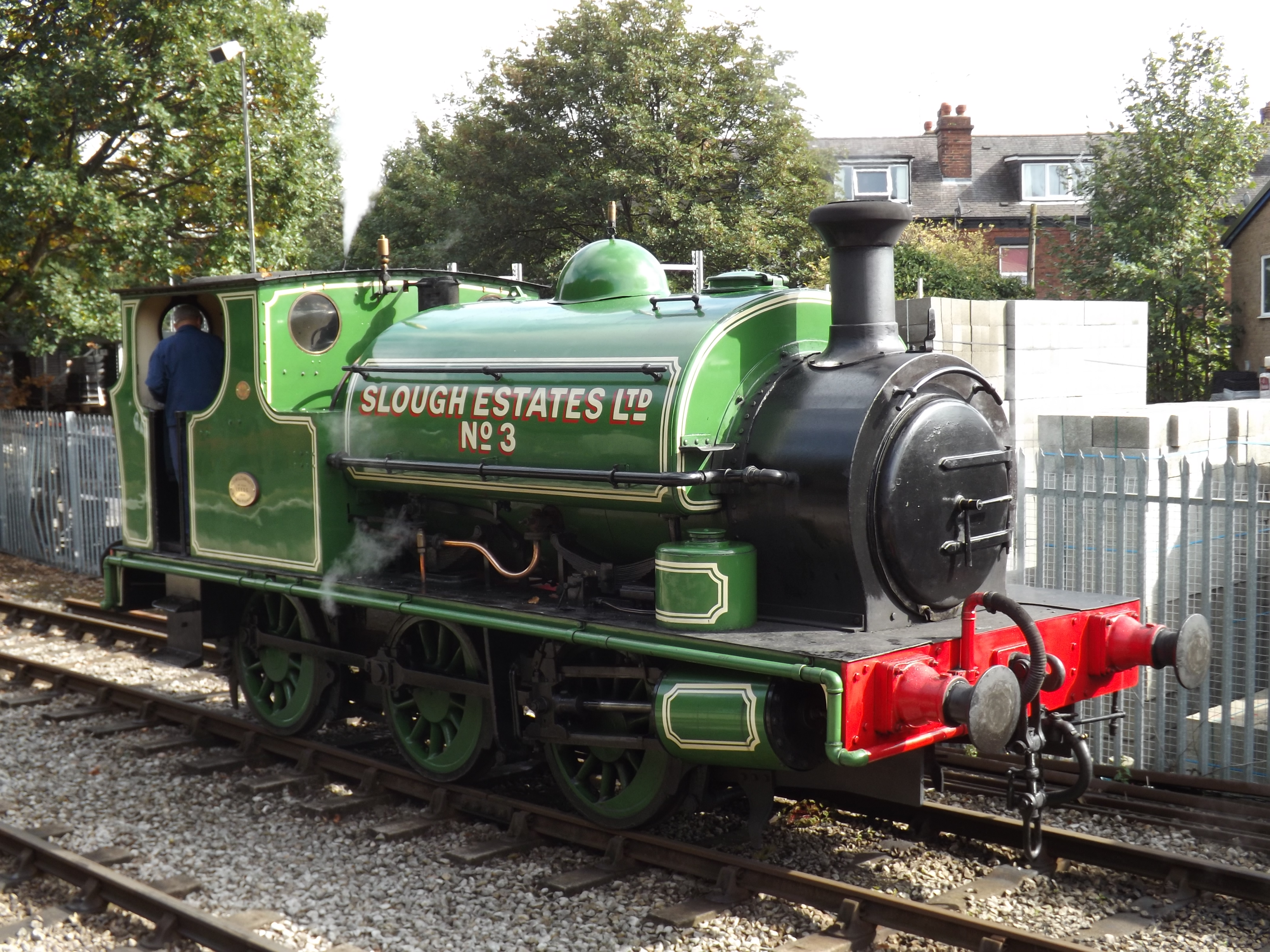
Slough Estates Nº3 of 1924, showing typically Hudswell Clarke style of saddle tank and bunker

Hudswell, Clarke and Company Limited was an engineering and locomotive building company in Jack Lane, Hunslet, Leeds, West Yorkshire, England.

== History ==
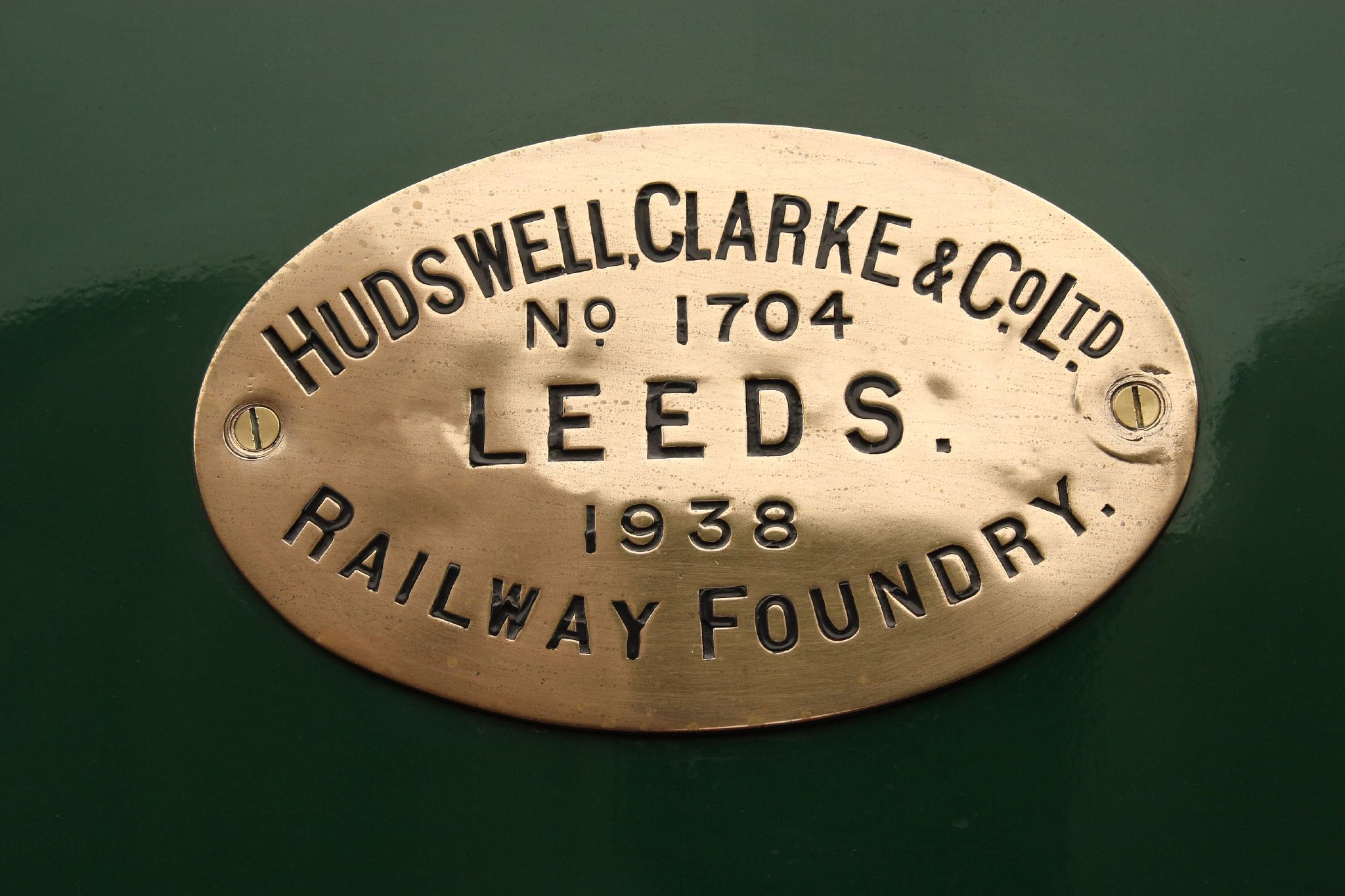
Hudswell Clarke builder's plate from 0-6-0T Nunlow

The company was founded as Hudswell and Clarke in 1860. In 1870 the name was changed to Hudswell, Clarke and Rodgers. There was another change in 1881 to Hudswell, Clarke and Company. The firm became a limited company in 1899.

In 1862, soon after the company had been formed, they were given the initial design work on William Hamond Bartholomew's compartment boats for the Aire and Calder Navigation. The choice of the company may have been influenced by the fact that Bartholomew, the chief engineer of the Navigation, and William Clayton, one of the founders of Hudswell and Clarke, both lived on Spencer Place in Leeds. They produced at least one of the prototype Tom Pudding compartments, but did not get the main contract for their production once the design work had been done.

As steam locomotive builders, like many of the smaller builders they specialised in small contractor's and industrial tank engines, and rarely built anything bigger than an 0-6-0T. They never built any locomotives with superheaters.

The locomotive part of the business is now part of the Hunslet Engine Company. Locomotive-building was always only one part of a diverse product inventory that included underground diesel-powered mining locomotives, hydraulic pit-props and related mining equipment.

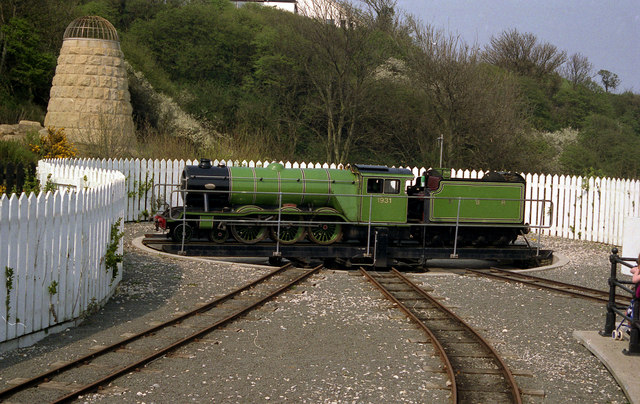
4-6-2 1931 Neptune at Scalby on the Scarborough North Bay Railway

In 1911 Hudswell Clarke entered into an agreement with Robert Hudson for the manufacture of narrow gauge locomotives. This arrangement produced sixteen standardised designs, designated 'A' to 'Q', which ranged from four-coupled (0-4-0) 5 hp engines to six-coupled (0-6-0) 55 hp models. The designs were sufficiently flexible to allow for the various track gauges in use. Over the years, 188 locomotives were supplied to these designs.

In the 1930s the company manufactured narrow gauge steam outline diesel-hydraulic locomotives for use at amusement parks around the country. In 1931 4-6-2 Neptune was delivered to Scarborough North Bay Railway, followed a year later by 4-6-2 Triton, both being 20 inches (510 mm) gauge. In the same year they supplied a 4-6-4T Robin Hood to Golden Acre Park in Leeds followed by a 4-6-2 May Thompson in 1933. They also supplied 4-6-2 Mary Louise and 4-6-4T Carol Jean to Blackpool Pleasure Beach for use on the 21 inches (530 mm) gauge Pleasure Beach Express in 1933. A fire in 1934 badly damaged Carol Jean so 4-6-2 Princess Royal was ordered as a replacement. They went on to build two more 4-6-2 class locomotives, Princess Elizabeth and Princess Margaret Rose for Billy Butlin to use at the Empire Exhibition in Glasgow in 1938 which were then transferred to his holiday camp in Clacton when the exhibition closed.

In later years, Hudswell Clarke designed and built diesel locomotives for both main-line and private company use, mainly for use on shunting operations.

== Surviving locomotives ==
=== Steam locomotives ===
| Works No. | Year | Type | Wheel arrangement | Gauge | Company | Name or No. | Location | Notes |
|---|---|---|---|---|---|---|---|---|
| 297 | 1888 | | 0-6-0 | 4 ft 8 1/2 in (1,435 mm) | Belambi Coal company NSW Australia | SOUTH BULLI No2 | THNSW CHULLORA SYDNEY | Recently acquired by THNSW and now stored undercover Chullora tank annex Sydney NSW |
| 402 | 1893 | | 0-4-0ST | 4 ft 8 1/2 in (1,435 mm) | | Lord Mayor | Keighley and Worth Valley Railway | |
| 431 | 1895 | | 0-6-0ST | 4 ft 8 1/2 in | | 431 | Chasewater Railway | |
| 496 | 1898 | | 0-6-0ST | 2 ft (610 mm) | North Eton Mill | 1 | Privately owned near Numurkah, Victoria, Australia | |
| 498 | 1899 | | 0-4-0ST | 4 ft 8 1/2 in (1,435 mm) | Østre Gasværk (Copenhagen, Denmark) | Nr. 1 *Skildpadden (The Turtle)* | Nordsjællands Veterantog, Græsted, Denmark | Painted in red and black livery as delivered in 1899. |
| 499 | 1899 | | 0-4-0ST | 4 ft 8 1/2 in (1,435 mm) | Østre Gasværk (Copenhagen, Denmark) | Nr. 2 | Danmarks Tekniske Museum, Helsingør, Denmark | On Static Display outside the museum. Can be seen on the corner of Støberivej and Industrivej. Is painted Black with Red Buffers. Is Technically identical to Nr.1 |
| 526 | 1899 | | 0-4-0ST | 4 ft 8 1/2 in | | Hawarden | Middleton Railway | Donated from Penrhyn Castle in 2024 and now on display in the railway's 'Engine House' museum. Painted in a black livery with red lining. |
| 555 | 1900 | | 0-6-0ST | 4 ft 8 1/2 in | Port Talbot Railway | 26 | Severn Valley Railway | Later Great Western Railway No 813, Backworth Colliery No 12 and NCB (Backworth Colliery) No 11. Restored as GWR 813. |
| 573 | 1900 | | 0-4-0ST | 3 ft (914 mm) | | Handyman | Statfold Barn Railway | Built for the ironstone quarry at Burton Latimer and moved to the Cranford Ironstone Co in 1921. Purchased by the Scaldwell Tramway in 1936, it last worked there in 1961. Purchased in 1964 by three W&LLR volunteers: Gerald Rainbow, David Plant and Bob Harris. They sold it to Alan Keef in 2004, who in turn sold it to the National Railway Museum in July 2008; transferred to Statfold 2021. Some cosmetic restoration undertaken. Currently in faded green but it is believed her original livery was grey with the name painted in red letters on the side tank. |
| 639 | 1902 | | 0-4-2ST | 21 21/32 in (550 mm) | | San Justo | Privately owned by Peter Rampton | |
| 640 | 1902 | | 0-4-2ST | 21 21/32 in | | Santa Ana | Privately owned by Peter Rampton | |
| 646 | 1903 | | 0-4-2ST | 3 ft 6 in (1,067 mm) | Wallaroo Phosphate Co, Australian Portland Cement | 6 | Bellarine Railway, Victoria, Australia | |
| 679 | 1903 | Canal | 0-6-0T | 4 ft 8 1/2 in | Manchester Ship Canal | 31; Hamburg | Keighley & Worth Valley Railway | |
| 680 | 1903 | Canal | 0-6-0T | 4 ft 8 1/2 in | Manchester Ship Canal | 32; Gothenburg | East Lancashire Railway | |
| 750 | 1906 | 14" cylinder, 20" stroke, 3' 3 1/2" wheels | 0-4-0ST | 4 ft 8 1/2 in | Skinner & Holford - Waleswood Colliery, Sheffield | Waleswood | Peak Rail | Moved from the Chasewater Railway in early 2024 |
| 895 | 1909 | | 0-6-0T | 4 ft 8 1/2 in | Fife Coal Company | | | |
| 1026 | 1913 | | 0-6-0ST | 4 ft 8 1/2 in | Sir Robert McAlpine and Sons | No 31 | Fawley Hill Railway, Buckinghamshire | Recorded at Fawley Hill, 18 May 2013. |
| 1067 | 1914 | | 0-6-0 | 2 ft | Colonial Sugar Refinery | Homebush | Sucrogen Victoria Mill, Ingham | Delivered to CSR Homebush Mill Mackay, loco number 6. Transferred to CSR Victoria Mill 1922, named Homebush. Preserved in working order 1978. |
| 1152 | 1919 | | 0-4-0ST | 5 ft 3 in (1,600 mm) | Guinness | 3 | Railway Preservation Society of Ireland | |
| 1223 | 1916 | | 0-6-0T | 4 ft 8 1/2 in | | Vesta | Bury Transport Museum | Moved from the Penrhyn Castle Railway Museum in early 2024 |
| 1238 | 1916 | | 0-6-0WT | 2 ft | Ashanti Goldfields Corporation | No. 9 | Moseley Railway Trust | Delivered in 1916 to what is now Ghana for their forestry railway. Crashed into a swamp and killed the driver in 1948, recovered 1996, and returned to the UK in 2008 for restoration. The restoration progressed well and the loco was in steam again by mid 2014. |
| 1243 | 1917 | | 0-6-0T | 4 ft 8 1/2 in | Port of London Authority | Richboro | Aln Valley Railway | |
| 1308 | 1918 | | 0-6-0ST | 4 ft 8 1/2 in | | Rhos | Rocks by Rail | |
| 1309 | 1917 | | 0-4-0ST | 4 ft 8 1/2 in | | Henry de Lacy II | Middleton Railway | |
| 1334 | 1918 | | 0-6-0T | 4 ft 8 1/2 in | Oxfordshire Ironstone Company | Sir Thomas | Buckinghamshire Railway Centre | |
| 1366 | 1919 | | 0-6-0ST | 4 ft 8 1/2 in | Renishaw Iron Works | No. 6 | Tanfield Railway | |
| 1369 | 1919 | | 0-6-0T | 4 ft 8 1/2 in | Manchester Ship Canal | 67 | Middleton Railway | |
| 1375 | 1919 | | 0-6-0WT | 600 mm (1 ft 11 5/8 in) | War Department Light Railways | 3205 | Preserved as Pejao at the CP museum at Santarem, Portugal | order sub-contracted from Robert Hudson Ltd Worked on the Pejoa Colliery system in Portugal with five O&K locos: Fojo, Pedamoura, Choupelo, Pedorido, Sao Domingos |
| 1423 | 1922 | | 0-4-0WT | 2 ft | Corrimal Colliery (originally National Portland Cement Limited tramway, Tasmania) | 'Hudson' | Campbelltown Steam & Machinery Menangle, New South Wales | |
| 1435 | 1922 | | 0-4-0ST | 4 ft 8 1/2 in | | Nellie | Bradford Industrial Museum | |
| 1450 | 1922 | | 0-6-0ST | 4 ft 8 1/2 in | | Gladiator | Embsay & Bolton Abbey Steam Railway | Rebuilt as Thomas the Tank Engine with side tanks |
| 1464 | 1921 | Sweden | 0-6-0T | 4 ft 8 1/2 in | Manchester Ship Canal | 70 | Swindon and Cricklade Railway | |
| 1539 | 1924 | | 0-6-0ST | 4 ft 8 1/2 in | | Derek Crouch | Nene Valley Railway | |
| 1542 | 1924 | | 0-4-0ST | 3 ft 6 in (1,067 mm) | Sir W. G. Armstrong, Whitworth & Co. | B10 | Oamaru Steam and Rail Restoration Society, New Zealand | |
| 1544 | 1924 | | 0-6-0ST | 4 ft 8 1/2 in | Slough Estates Ltd. | No. 3 | Middleton Railway | framless |
| 1555 | 1926 | | 0-6-0 | 2 ft | Goondi Mill | 6 | Allambi Private Railway, Strath Creek, Victoria, Australia | |
| 1559 | 1925 | | 0-4-2ST | 2 ft | Pleystowe Mill | 4 | Puffing Billy Railway, Melbourne, Australia | |
| 1582 | 1926 | | 0-4-0ST | 3 ft 6 in (1,067 mm) | | | Rotorua Ngongotaha Railway, New Zealand | |
| 1631 | 1930 | | 0-6-0WT | 4 ft 8 1/2 in | | 5 | | |
| 1632 | 1929 | | 0-4-0ST | 4 ft 8 1/2 in | | Patricia | Bygones Museum, Torquay | |
| 1643 | 1930 | | 0-6-0WT | 2 ft | | Bronllwyd | Statfold Barn Railway | |
| 1644 | 1930 | | 0-8-0ST | 1,000 mm | Riga Sugar Mill, Bihar, India | "Lilian" | Rewari Steam Centre, India | |
| 1672 | 1937 | | 0-4-0ST | 4 ft 8 1/2 in | | Irwell | Tanfield Railway | |
| 1682 | 1937 | | 0-6-0ST | 4 ft 8 1/2 in | Sir Lindsay Parkinson & Co Ltd, Chorley 1937–1946 British Sugar Corporation, Kelham, Newark, Nottinghamshire | Sir Lindsay Parkinson & Co Ltd No 12 54; Julia | Private Site, Derbyshire | Under restoration |
| 1700 | 1938 | | 0-6-0ST | 4 ft 8 1/2 in | | Wissington | North Norfolk Railway | restored 7/2012 |
| 1704 | 1938 | | 0-6-0T | 4 ft 8 1/2 in | | Nunlow | Keighley & Worth Valley Railway | |
| 1706 | 1939 | | 0-6-0 | 2 ft | Victoria Mill | Cairns | Illawarra Light Railway Museum, Albion Park Rail, New South Wales, Australia | |
| 1709 | 1939 | | 0-6-0ST | 4 ft 8 1/2 in | Slough Estates Ltd. | No. 5 | Embsay and Bolton Abbey Steam Railway | |
| 1731 | 1942 | | 0-6-0T | 4 ft 8 1/2 in | | 20; Jennifer | Aln Valley Railway | |
| 1737 | 1943 | Hunslet Austerity 0-6-0ST | 0-6-0ST | 4 ft 8 1/2 in | Nederlandse Spoorwegen | 8811 | Stoomstichting Nederland, Rotterdam, Netherlands | ex WD 5080 |
| 1742 | 1946 | | 0-4-0ST | 4 ft 8 1/2 in | Millom Iron Works, Cumberland | MILLOM | Buckinghamshire Railway Centre | |
| 1776 | 1944 | Hunslet Austerity 0-6-0ST | 0-6-0ST | 4 ft 8 1/2 in | National Coal Board | Harry | Horwich, Lancashire | ex WD 1499 |
| 1782 | 1945 | Hunslet Austerity 0-6-0ST | 0-6-0ST | 4 ft 8 1/2 in | War Department | 118; Brussels | Keighley and Worth Valley Railway | ex WD 1505 |
| 1800 | 1947 | | 0-6-0T | 4 ft 8 1/2 in | | Thomas | Nene Valley Railway | Name given by creator Wilbert Awdry in 1971. |
| 1821 | 1948 | | 0-6-0T | 4 ft 8 1/2 in | | 140 | | |
| 1822 | 1949 | | 0-6-0T | 4 ft 8 1/2 in | | S100 | Chasewater Railway | |
| 1823 | 1949 | | 0-6-0T | 4 ft 8 1/2 in | | 38 | Tanfield Railway | |
| 1838 | 1950 | | 0-6-0 | 2 ft | Victoria Mill | Sydney | Privately owned, Mount Molloy, Queensland, Australia | |
| 1862 | 1952 | | 0-6-0T | 2 ft | Macknade Mill | 6 | Privately owned Mandalong Valley Tramway, Mandalong, New South Wales, Australia | |
| 1863 | 1925 | | 0-6-0 | 2 ft | Macknade Mill | 9 | Puffing Billy Railway, Melbourne, Australia | |
| 1882 | 1955 | | 0-4-0ST | 4 ft 8 1/2 in | | Mirvale | Middleton Railway | |
| 1884/55 | 1944 | | 0-6-0T | 4 ft 8 1/2 in | Newmarket Colliery, Wakefield | Cathryn | Ecclesbourne Valley Railway | Converted by the National Coal Board (NCB) to a gas production system which entailed it being provided with an underfeed stoker. This also required the conversion of the chimney to a characteristic conical design that Cathryn now carries. The underfeed stoker has been removed and will not be refitted to the locomotive when the locomotive has been fully restored to working condition. |
| 1885 | 1955 | | 0-6-0T | 4 ft 8 1/2 in | | 1 Alston | Mid-Suffolk Light Railway | |
| 1664 | 1935 | | 0-6-0 | 2 ft | | 21 Anne Elizabeth | Edaville Railroad, Carver, Massachusetts, USA | |

=== Diesel locomotives ===
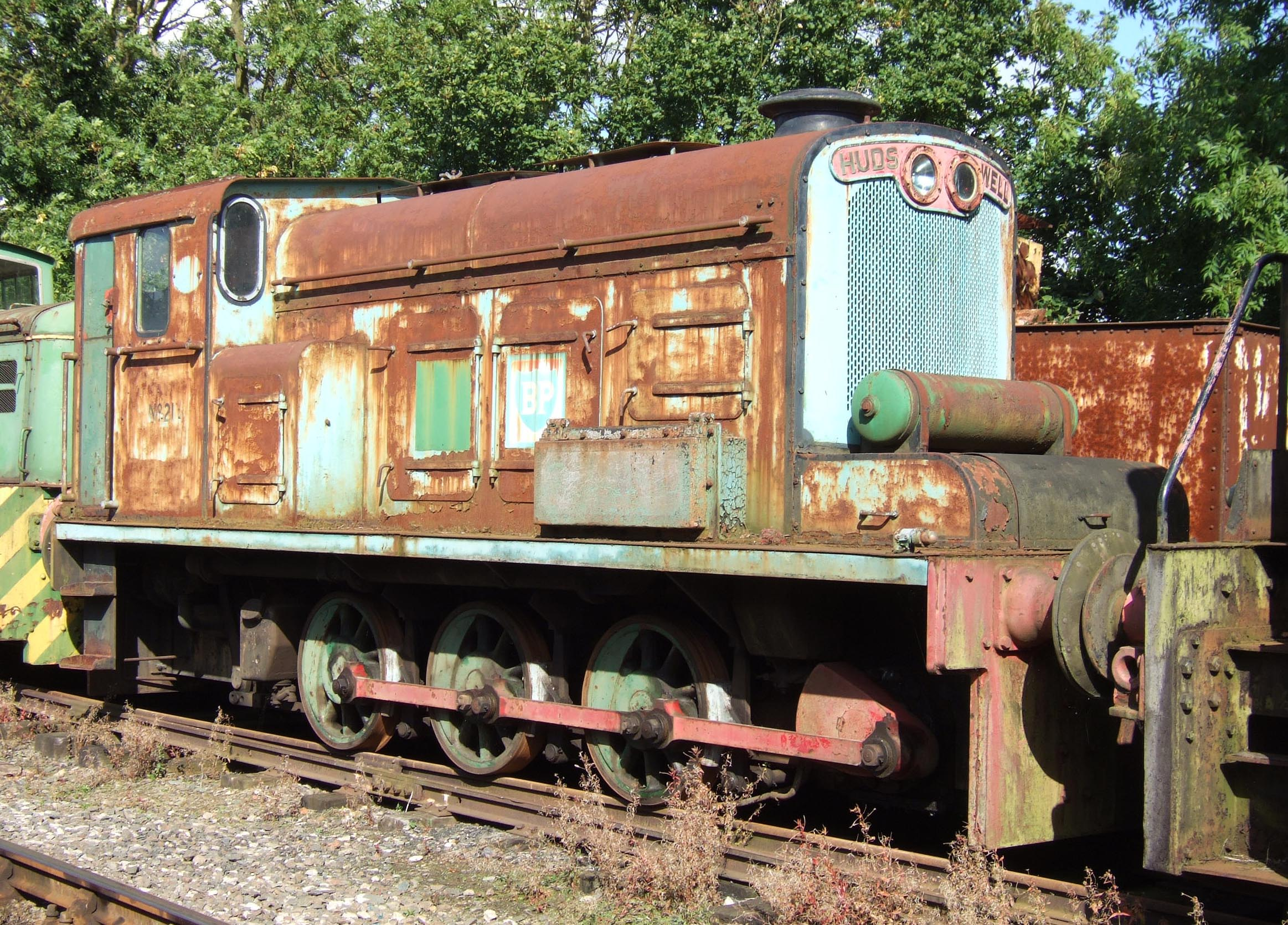
A typical Hudswell Clarke Diesel Locomotive from the 1950s, a Class D2/7.

Standard gauge (4 ft 8 1/2 in (1,435 mm))

- British Rail Class D2/7 (D1211 "Manton" at the National Coal Mining Museum for England in Overton)
- British Rail Class D2/12 (one preserved)
- 0-4-0DM D577/1932 Mary at Middleton Railway
- 0-4-0DM Southam (works no. D604) was outside the Great Western Country Pub and Restaurant, Bishop's Itchington, near Southam, Warwickshire in 2006 but has since left for an unknown destination
- 0-4-0DM Southam 2 (works no. D625) at Leeds Industrial Museum
- 0-4-0DM Mighty Atom (works no. D628) at Ribble Steam Railway
- 0-4-0DM Sparky (works no. D629) at Ribble Steam Railway
- 0-4-0DM Margaret (works no. D1031) at Ribble Steam Railway
- 0-4-0DM Cadbury No. 14 (works no. D1012) was at Cadbury World. Arrived at the Statfold Barn Railway in 2022, where it is to be cosmetically restored as a "gate guardian".
- 0-6-0DE Manchester Ship Canal 4001 Alnwick Castle (works no. D1075 of 1958) at Winfield's Store, Haslingden, Lancs
- 0-6-0DE Manchester Ship Canal 4002 Arundel Castle (works no. D1076 of 1958) at East Lancs Railway
- 0-4-0DM D631/1946 Carroll at Middleton Railway
- 0-6-0D D707 No. 21 at the Rutland Railway
- 0-4-0DM Elland No.1 (works no. D1153) at Mangapps Railway Museum, Burnham-on-Crouch

2 ft 6 in (762 mm) gauge

- Eight 145HP, 20 ton 0-8-0 locomotives, and twenty-four 225HP, 29 ton 2-8-2 locomotives, for the Sierra Leone Government Railway, supplied between 1954 and 1961. (not necessarily preserved)

2 ft (610 mm) gauge

- 4wDM No. D558 (built 1930) at the Moseley Railway Trust at their Apedale Valley Light Railway
- 4wDM No. D564 (built 1930) at the Phyllis Rampton Trust

=== Steam-outline diesel locomotives ===
20-inch (510 mm) gauge

- 4-6-2 Neptune (1931), Scarborough North Bay Railway
- 4-6-2 Triton (1932), Scarborough North Bay Railway
- 4-6-4T Robin Hood (1932), Scarborough North Bay Railway
- 4-6-2 Poseidon (1933), Scarborough North Bay Railway

21-inch (530 mm) gauge

- 4-6-2 Mary Louise (1933), Pleasure Beach Express, Blackpool
- 4-6-4T Carol Jean (1933), Pleasure Beach Express, Blackpool
- 4-6-2 Geoffrey Thompson OBE (1934), Pleasure Beach Express, Blackpool
- 4-6-2 Princess Elizabeth (1938), Midland Railway - Butterley undergoing restoration.
- 4-6-2 Princess Margaret Rose (1938), Midland Railway - Butterley

== Military engineering ==
A Blue Danube bomb

During the Second World War the company was one of many engineering firms that diversified into armaments. After the War, Hudswell Clarke was closely involved in various secret programmes, including the British nuclear weapon programme. The airframe (casing) for the first British nuclear bomb, Blue Danube, was manufactured by Hudswell Clarke at its Roundhay Road plant in Leeds. The Blue Danube was 24 ft long x 62 inches diameter. It was known to the RAF as "Bomb, Aircraft, HE 10,000 lb MC". Released from 45,000 ft at 500 knots (930 km/h) its maximum velocity was 2480 ft/s (Mach 2.2). It bears a likeness to the Tallboy and Grand Slam "earthquake" bombs designed by Barnes Wallis. Wallis was a consultant on the design of Blue Danube.

A Red Beard bomb on its bomb trolley awaiting loading into a Canberra bomber

The airframe for Red Beard, the second generation tactical nuclear bomb was also built by Hudswell, Clarke. This tactical atomic bomb had perforated baffles to reduce bomb bay buffeting when dropped from a Canberra bomber; they were not needed on other aircraft. Red Beard was known to the RAF as "Bomb, Aircraft, HE 2'000 lb MC", although its actual weight was 1650 lb. It was deployed on a wide variety of aircraft of the RAF and Royal Navy, being stockpiled in the UK, Cyprus, Singapore and afloat on carriers.

Hudswell, Clarke also worked on Violet Club, the Interim Megaton Weapon. All the bombs detonated at the Christmas Island H-bomb tests were contained in airframes designed and built by Hudswell Clarke. The company were also major contributors to other military projects, including the Centurion main battle tank conversion into an armoured bridgelayer, that served with the British Army for many years. The contraction of defence manufacturing in the mid-1960s contributed to the sale and demise of the company.

== Preservation ==
Locations of preserved Hudswell Clarke locomotives include:

United Kingdom

- Aln Valley Railway, Northumberland
- Buckinghamshire Railway Centre, Quainton Road, Buckinghamshire
- Chasewater Railway, Staffordshire
- East Lancashire Railway, Greater Manchester and Lancashire
- Ecclesbourne Valley Railway, Derbyshire
- Embsay and Bolton Abbey Steam Railway, North Yorkshire
- Great Central Railway (Nottingham), Ruddington, Nottinghamshire
- Keighley and Worth Valley Railway, West Yorkshire
- Middleton Railway, Hunslet, West Yorkshire
- Nene Valley Railway, Wansford, Cambridgeshire
- North Bay Railway, Scarborough, North Yorkshire
- North Norfolk Railway, Sheringham, Norfolk
- Penrhyn Castle Railway Museum, Bangor, North Wales
- Pontypool and Blaenavon Railway, South Wales
- Ribble Steam Railway, Lancashire
- Rutland Railway Museum, Cottesmore, Rutland
- Statfold Barn Railway, Tamworth, Staffordshire
- Swindon and Cricklade Railway, Blunsdon, Wiltshire
- Tanfield Railway, County Durham

Ireland

- Railway Preservation Society of Ireland, Whitehead, Co. Antrim

New Zealand

- Oamaru Steam and Rail Restoration Society, New Zealand

Denmark

- Nordsjællands Veterantog, Græsted, Denmark
- Danmarks Tekniske Museum The Danish museum of Technology, Helsingør/Elsinore, Denmark

United States

- Edaville Railroad, Carver, Massachusetts

== Model railways ==
In 2012, Ixion Models introduced an O gauge model of a Hudswell Clarke 0-6-0ST, similar to No. 1700 Wissington.

== See also ==
- List of early British private locomotive manufacturers
