= British Rail Class D2/7 =

Class of 10 diesel-powered British locomotives

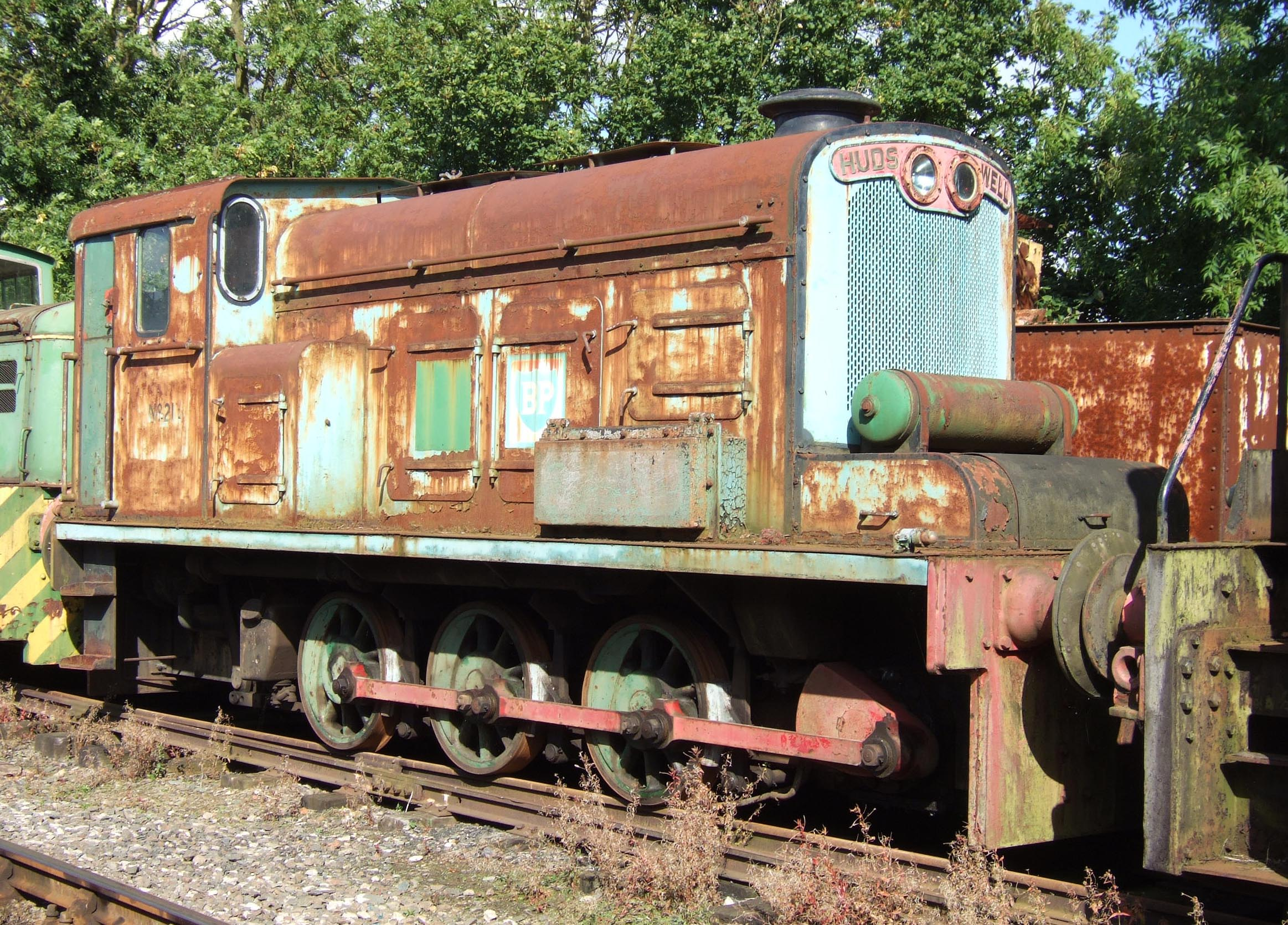
- A similar Hudswell Clarke locomotive (D707) shown in 2005
Type and origin
- Power type: Diesel-mechanical
- Builder: Hudswell Clarke
- Serial number: D898–D902, D938–D942
- Build date: 1955–1956
Specifications
- Configuration
  - Whyte: 0-6-0 DM
  - UIC: C
- Gauge: 4 ft 8 1/2 in (1,435 mm) standard gauge
- Wheel diameter: 3 ft 6 in (1.067 m)
- Loco weight: 36.35 long tons (36.93 t; 40.71 short tons)
- Prime mover: Gardner 8L3
- Transmission: Mechanical, SSS Powerflow three-speed gearbox
- MU working: Not fitted
- Train heating: None
- Train brakes: None
Performance figures
- Maximum speed: 14 mph (23 km/h)
- Power output: Engine: 204 bhp (152 kW)
- Tractive effort: 16,100 lbf (71.6 kN)
Career
- Operators: British Railways
- Class: D2/7; later 2/14; no TOPS class
- Numbers: 11116–11120, 11144–11148; D2500–D2509 from 1958 to 1962
- Axle load class: Route availability 4
- Retired: 1967
- Disposition: All scrapped

British Rail Class D2/7 was a locomotive commissioned by British Rail in England. It was a diesel powered locomotive in the pre-TOPS period built by Hudswell Clarke with a Gardner engine. The mechanical transmission, using a scoop control fluid coupling and three-speed Power-flow SSS (synchro-self-shifting) gearbox, was a Hudswell Clarke speciality.

== History ==
Ten locomotives were bought by British Railways in two batches of five, for use in Birkenhead Docks. The first batch, Hudswell Clarke works numbers D898–D902, entered service as British Railways nos. 11116–20 between December 1955 and February 1956; they were originally painted black, but repainted green later on. The second batch, Hudswell Clarke works numbers D938–D942, entered service as British Railways nos. 11144–48 between April and July 1956; this batch were painted green from new. Between May 1958 and January 1962, all ten were renumbered D2500–9 in the same order as their original numbers. Withdrawal from service occurred between February and November 1967, and the locomotives were scrapped between August 1967 and June 1969.

== Modelling ==
A kit is available from Invertrain in 7 mm Scale (O Gauge)

Mercian Models make kits for this locomotive and the very similar industrial version, in both 4 mm and 7 mm scale.

== See also ==
- List of British Rail classes

== Sources ==
- Ian Allan ABC of British Railways Locomotives, winter 1962/3 edition, page 199
