= Peasholm Park =

Park in Scarborough, North Yorkshire, England

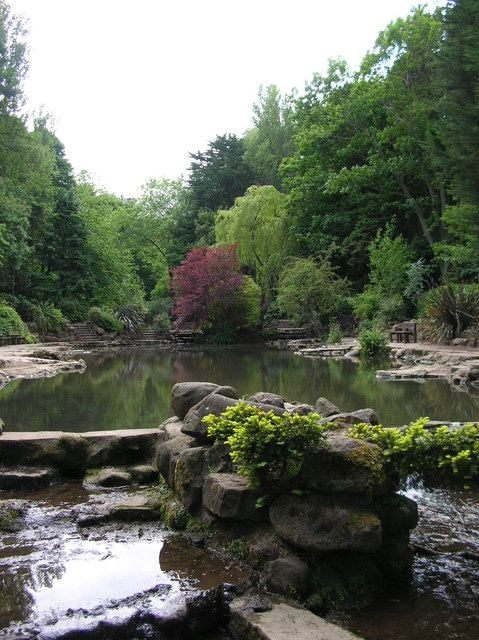
- Peasholm Park
- Interactive map of Peasholm Park
- Type: Municipal
- Location: Scarborough, North Yorkshire
- OS grid: TA035894
- Coordinates: 54.2912°N 0.4101°W
- Area: 14 hectares (35 acres)
- Created: 1912
- Operator: Scarborough Borough Council
- Status: Open all year

Peasholm Park (/ˈpiːzoʊm/) is an oriental themed municipal park located in the seaside town of Scarborough, North Yorkshire, England. It opened in 1912 and became a venue for galas, displays and exhibitions. The park was extended to include Peasholm Glen, a natural ravine, in 1924. Attractions include an artificial boating lake, where mock naval battles are staged, a putting green and a champion tree walk. The park suffered a decline in use from the 1970s as the number of holidaymakers visiting Scarborough decreased but it has been restored using Heritage Lottery Funding.

== Setting ==
Peasholm Park is sited on the north side of the town of Scarborough in a mainly residential area. The site is about 14-hectares and takes in a narrow steep-sided valley running north-east towards North Bay. The valley gradually broadens until it opens out on to low-lying ground closer to the sea. The south-west tip of the site adjoins a cemetery which was opened in the late 19th century, the north-east boundary of the site is the A165 road, which is here called Columbus Ravine. The boundary on the south and south-east side is Peasholm Drive and the cemetery. On the north side the boundary is Northstead Manor Drive and the west boundary is at roads called Ryndleside and Glenside. There is iron fencing on the perimeter of the park in some places but most of the park boundary is defined just by pavements or grass verges alongside the roads.

== History ==
The park is on the site of a medieval manor house of Northstead which was part of the Crown Estate from the 14th century. By the beginning of the 20th century the area was open land used for farming and as allotments. In 1911 Scarborough Corporation bought some land called Tuckers Field from the Duchy of Lancaster to create a public park. It was the borough engineer, Harry W Smith, who had the idea of setting out the gardens in Japanese style. Japanese style statues in the park were purchased from Killerby Hall and exotic shrubs and flowers were imported from the home of a local retired banker who was living in the French Riviera. In 1924, the park was extended south-westwards along Peasholm Glen following the purchase of more land from the Duchy of Lancaster 1921. Parts of the east side of the Glen were in private ownership and these were donated to the Corporation. The park was used for aquatic displays, musical performances and evening firework displays. It became immensely popular in the immediate pre- and post-Second World War era. After a period of decay a programme of restoration was initiated. Improvement works were made possible by the granting of funding of over £300,000 from the Heritage Lottery Fund and additional funds from Scarborough Borough Council. Following the draining of the lake, work was undertaken to remove the large amount of silt in the lake bottom, with the aim of removing enough silt to free sufficient water capacity for the lake to operate successfully. The park remains open and in public ownership.

The park received grade II listed status from English Heritage in 1999.

The park was closed in 1999, following a fire at the pagoda started by vandals. Heritage lottery funding has since allowed the restoration of the pagoda, the Half-Moon Bridge and the gardens.

== Features ==
The Peasholm Glen Tree Trail has rare and unusual trees. The lottery-funded project there aims to conserve the trees and provides a leafleted trail identifying the most interesting and important species. The leaflet is free and is also available to download from the internet. Together with signage on site, it opens up this resource to the widest possible audience. During restoration of the site the Dicksonian Elm, a tree that was previously believed to be extinct, was discovered alive and well in Peasholm Glen. Japanese themed gardens and lake with a pagoda said to be based on the Willow Pattern pottery design, are a central feature of the park. The lake has a central island which is accessible from a Japanese-style bridge, during school holidays and tourist seasons in the daytime when the gate is unlocked. There are waterfalls and wildlife in the more tranquil wooded areas.

== Events ==
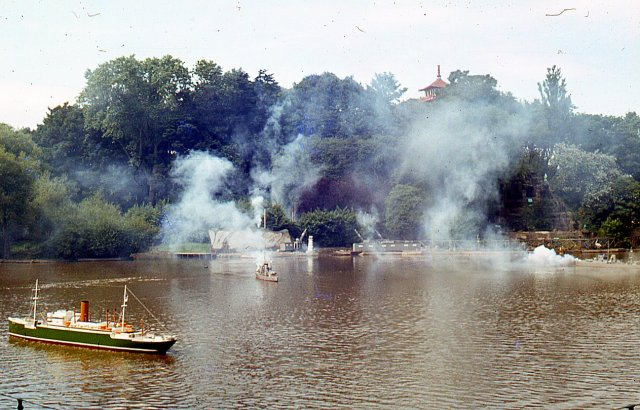
Naval Warfare event

The Naval Warfare event, Battle of Peasholm, has been played out for half an hour three times a week during the summer season for over 80 years. The model boats used are mostly steered by human drivers, earning the fleet the title of "The smallest manned navy in the world". All the boats were man powered, until 1929, when electricity was introduced, and now only the larger boats need to be steered by council employees. In the early days, the models were First World War battleships and a U-boat. Then, after the Second World War, the fleet was replaced with new vessels and the battle that was recreated was the Battle of the River Plate.

Other events staged in the park include silver and brass band concerts, party in the park, proms in the park and lantern displays.

== Photo gallery ==
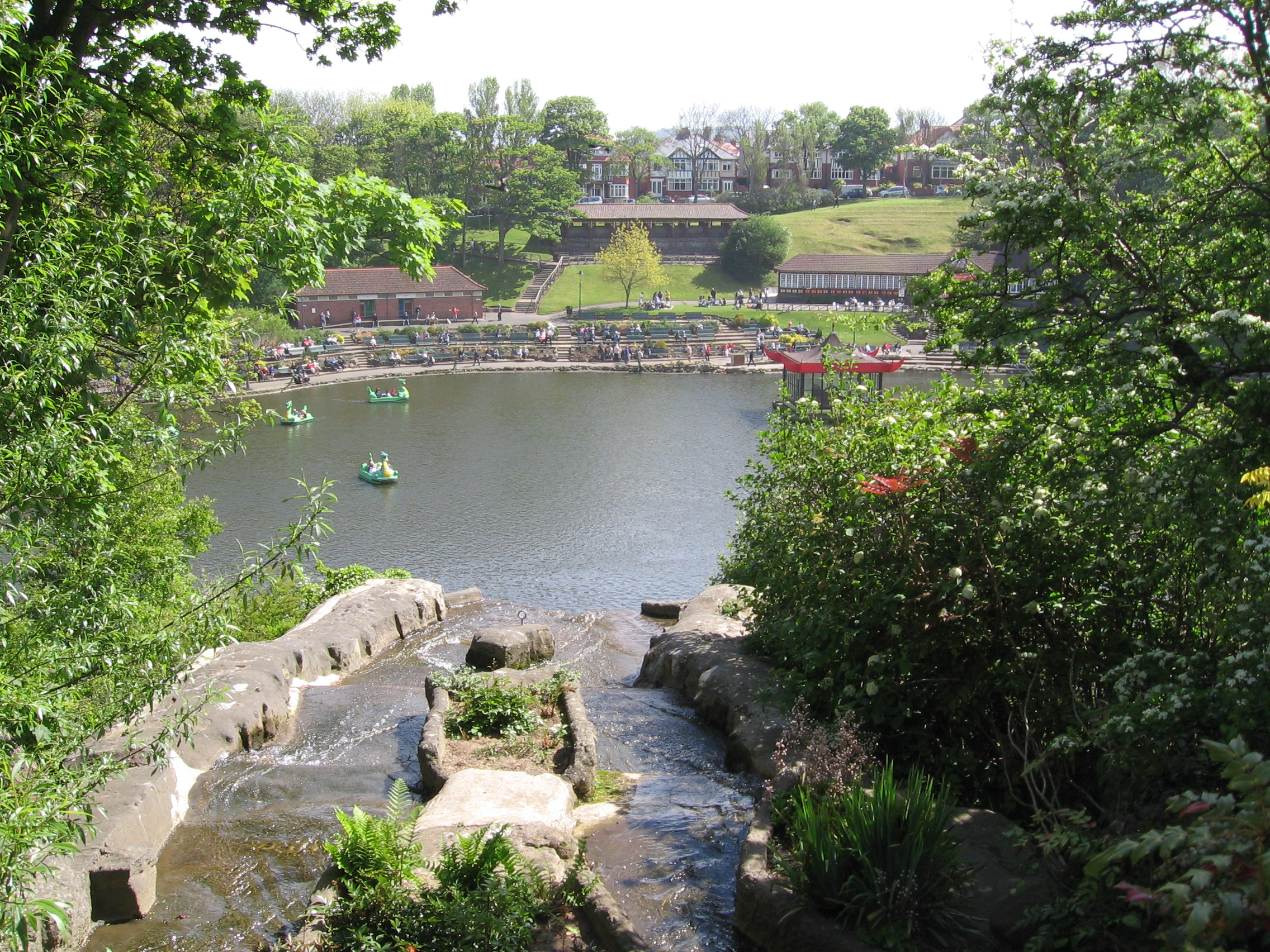

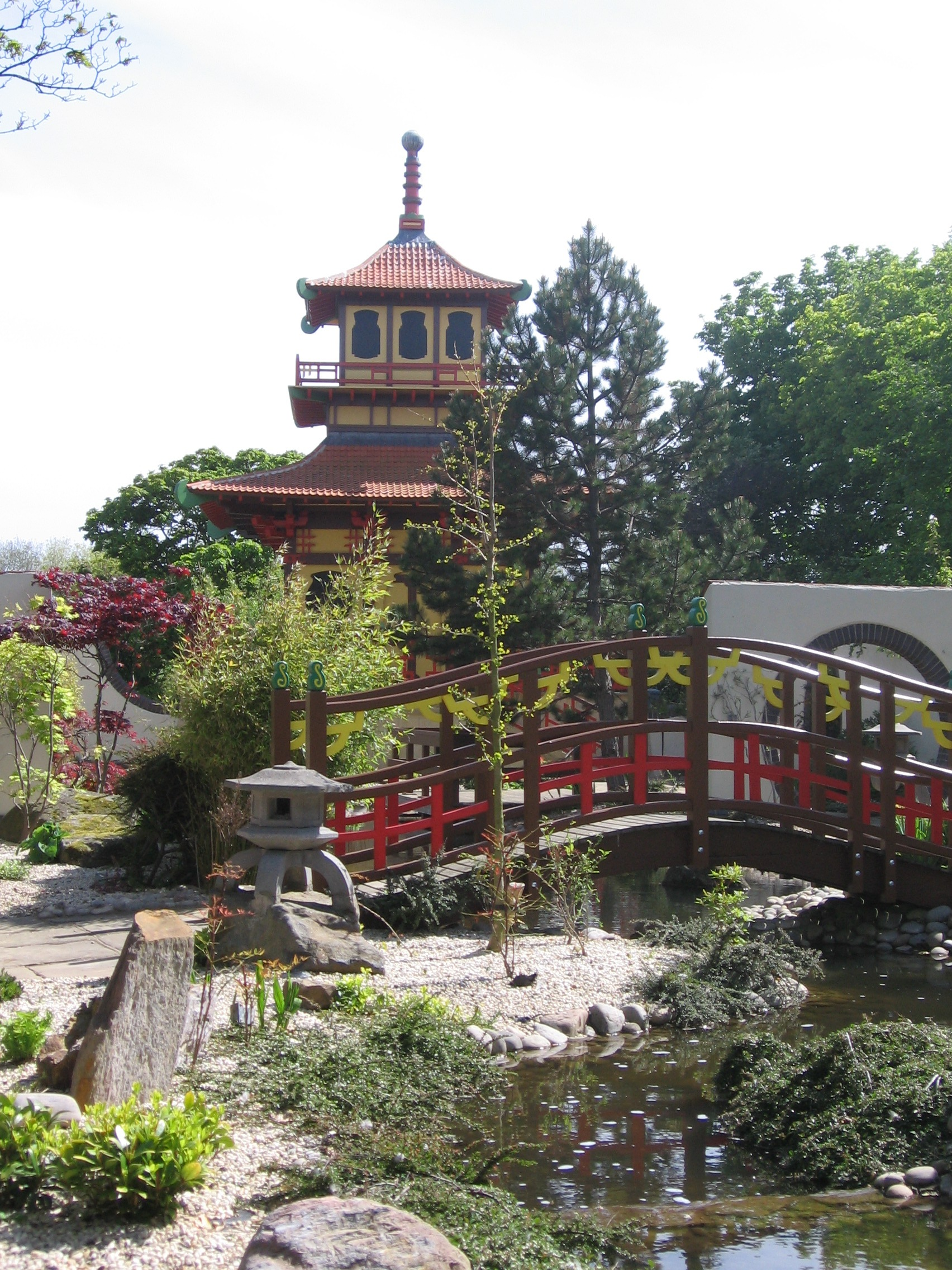

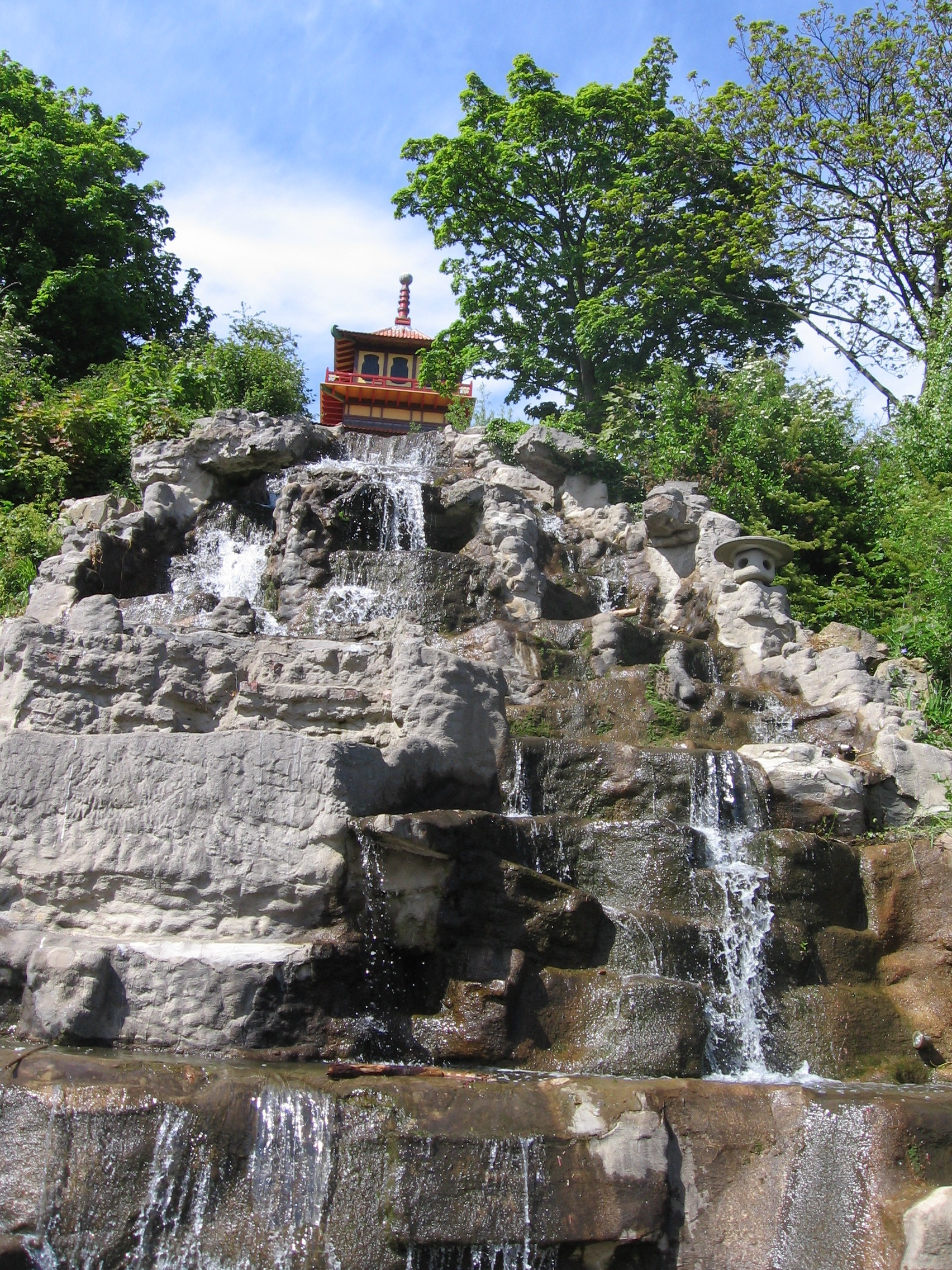

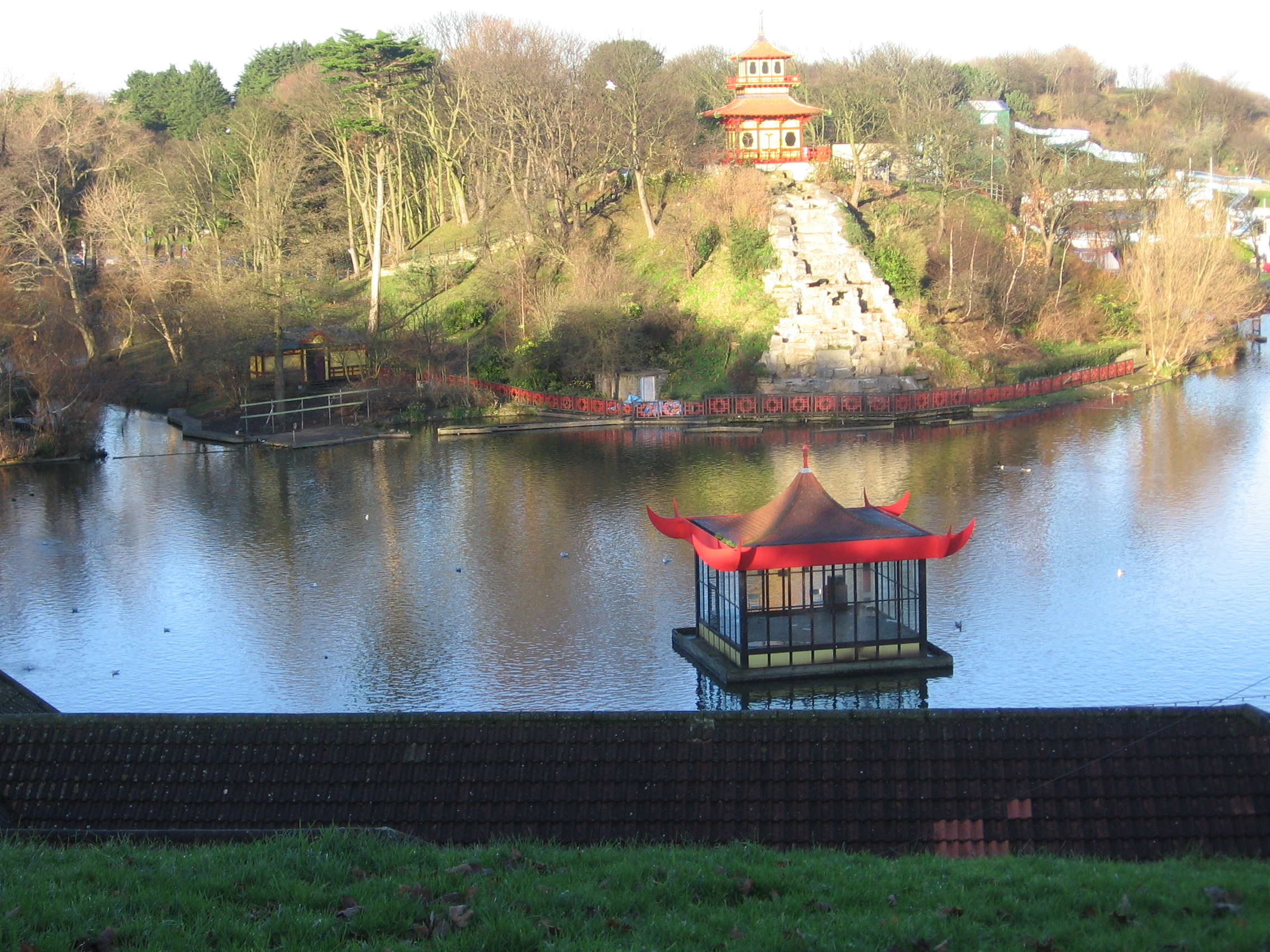

A grant from the Heritage Lottery Fund has enabled the Scarborough Borough Council to rebuild the Pagoda in its original form using fire retardant wood. The Half-moon Bridge connecting the Island to the mainland has been replaced, the cascade upgraded and the gardens restored and upgraded.
