= Scarborough Open Air Theatre =

Open air theatre in Scarborough, North Yorkshire, England

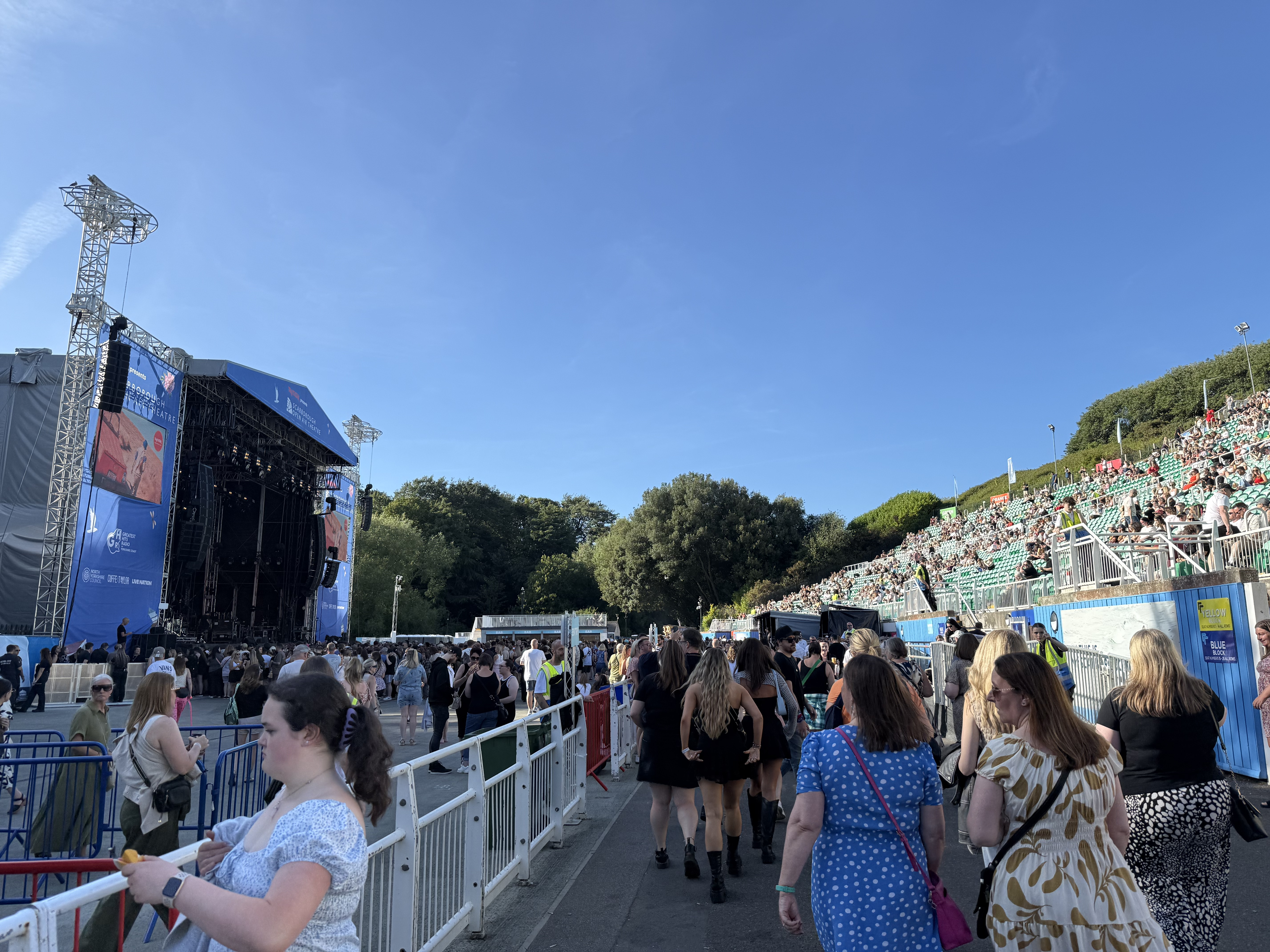
- Scarborough Open Air Theatre in 2025
- Interactive map of Scarborough Open Air Theatre
- Address: Northstead Manor Gardens; Burniston Road; YO12 6PF; Scarborough; England
- Coordinates: 54.295°N 0.412°W
- Capacity: 8,000
- Type: Outdoor theatre
- Current use: Multi-use

Construction
- Opened: 1932
- Rebuilt: 2010
- Years active: 1932–1986; 2010–

Website
- Official website

Scarborough Open Air Theatre (commonly abbreviated the SOAT or OAT) is an outdoor theatre in Scarborough, North Yorkshire, England. It was built in Northstead Manor Gardens in 1932, and originally closed in 1986 but was reopened in May 2010.

== History ==
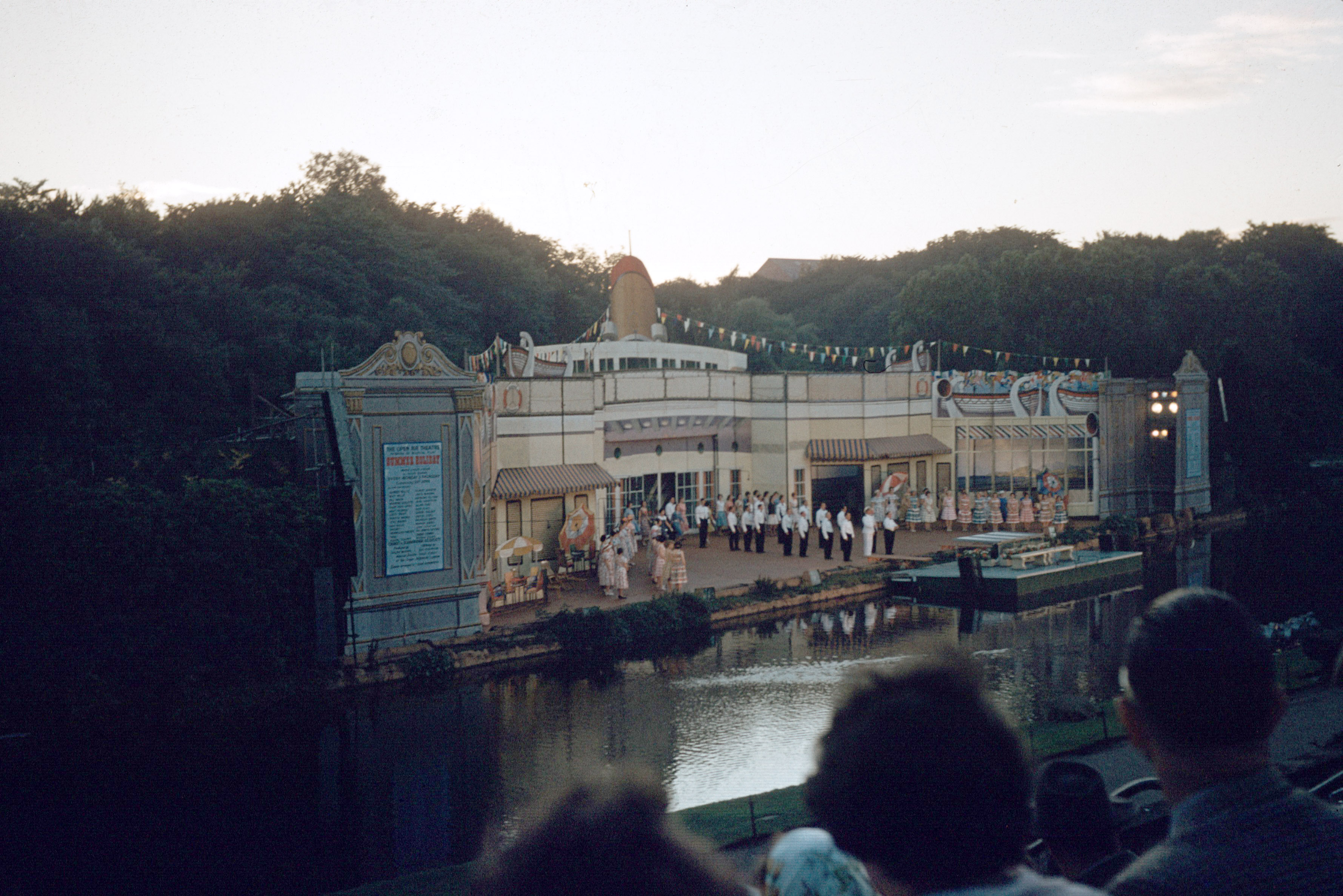
The stage area and lake in July 1960 during a production of Summer Holiday

The Scarborough Open Air Theatre was opened on the grounds of Northstead Manor Gardens in 1932 by Lord Mayor of London Sir Percy Greenaway, 1st Baronet, with the first performance at the theatre being a production of comic opera Merrie England. Uniquely for an outdoor venue, the stage area was situated on an island formed in a lake, with a five-block seating area on the opposite end of the lake having a capacity of 5,876 seats.

Two performances a week were usually held at the theatre during the summer period, with game show It's a Knockout, held every Wednesday, commonly drawing large crowds to the theatre and setting an unofficial attendance record of 11,000. Musicals at the theatre ceased by 1968 following a performance of West Side Story, and the venue further declined in 1977 with the demolition of dressing rooms and the island stage, as well as the removal of seating. The theatre closed in 1986 following a final performance by James Last and His Orchestra.

=== Reopening ===
In 2008, planning permission was received for a major renovation. The £3.5 million scheme to transform the Open Air Theatre was completed in May 2010.

The theatre was officially opened by Queen Elizabeth II, accompanied by Prince Philip, Duke of Edinburgh, on 20 May 2010. Initially after reopening, the capacity of the theatre was 6,500; this was increased to 8,000 in 2017 when part of the lake area was covered over.

== Events ==
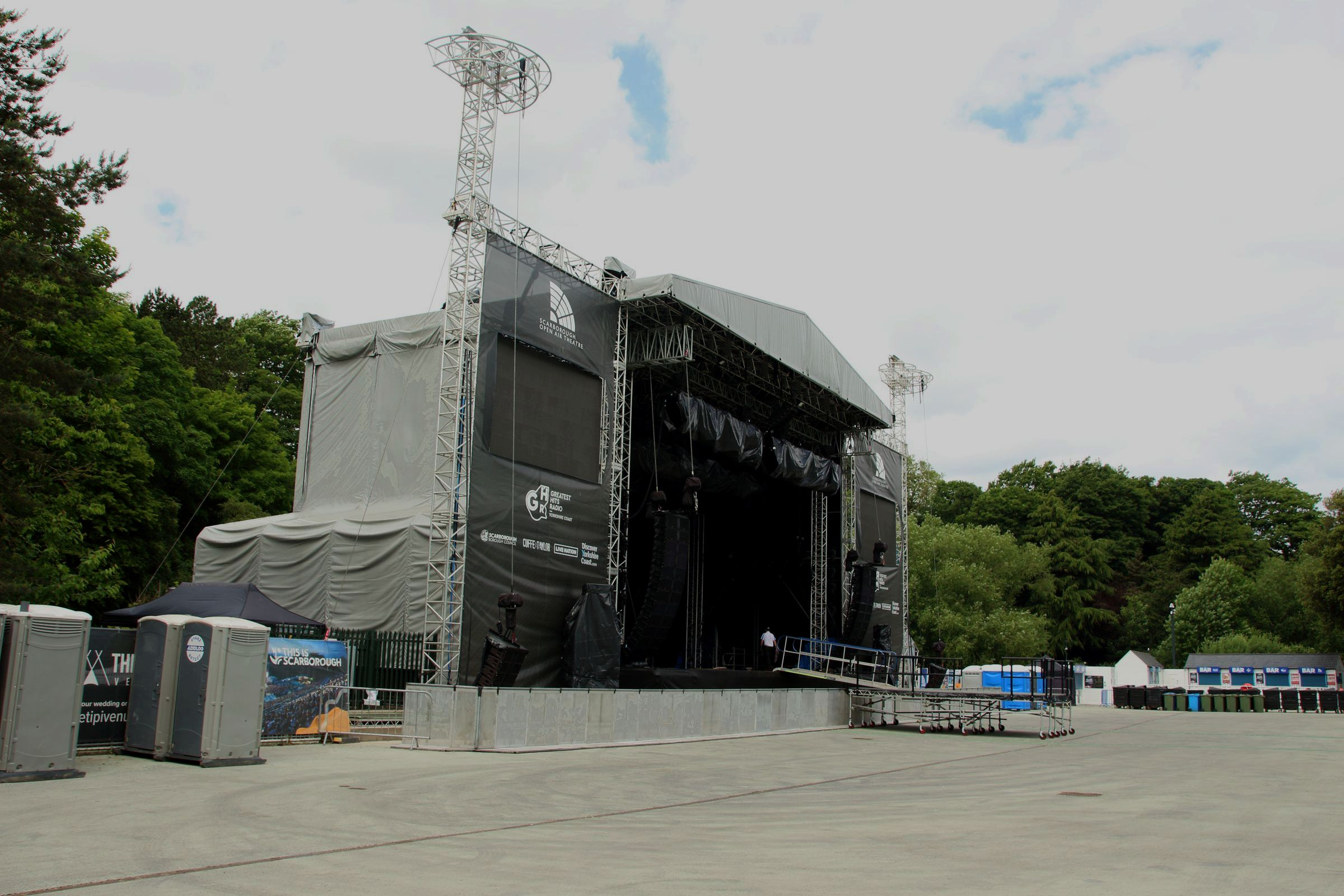
The stage area in June 2022

The venue stages a mixed entertainment programme including music concerts, opera productions and community events. Many British and international acts perform at the venue.

During the World Cup 2010, all England football matches were shown live on a large TV screen for free.

In September 2017 music promoters Cuffe & Taylor signed a ten-year deal with Scarborough Borough Council to bring concerts to the venue for the next ten years.

90,000 people attended concerts at the venue in 2018, setting a new audience record for the venue and bringing an estimated £7 million to the local economy. In December 2018 the venue was used to host the Scarborough Sparkle Christmas event with an ice rink and Christmas market.

The venue's attendance record was broken during the 2024 season, with a combined total of 116,606 people attending 18 concerts, the last of which was held in September by the band Busted.
