= Valley Gardens and South Cliff Gardens =

Park in Scarborough, North Yorkshire, England

Coordinates: 54°16′24″N 0°23′49″W

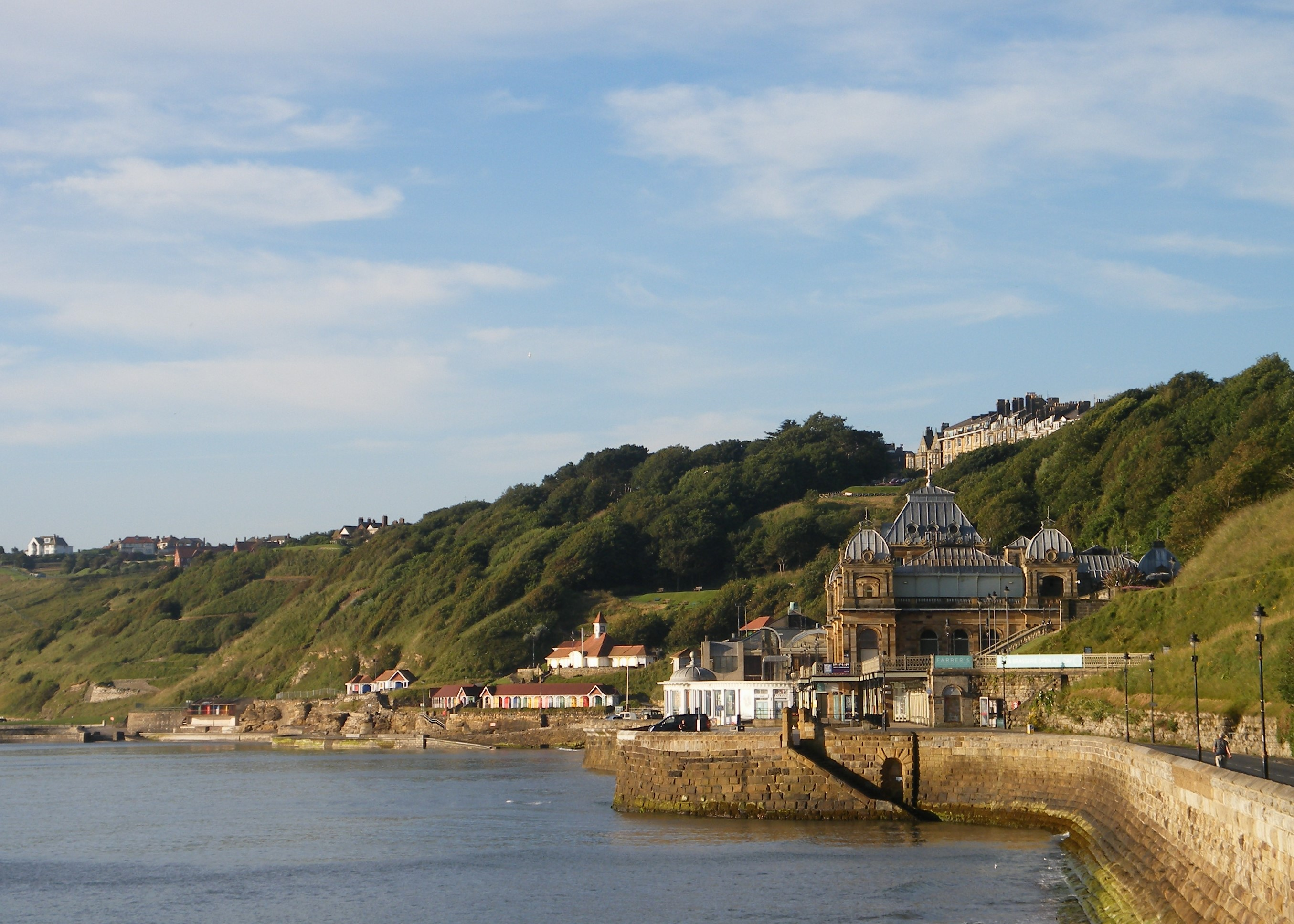
The South Cliff Gardens, seen behind Scarborough Spa

Valley Gardens and South Cliff Gardens are a historic park in Scarborough, North Yorkshire, a town in England.

== History ==
A mineral spring was discovered in 1626, at the bottom of the South Cliff. Scarborough Spa grew up around the spring, and walks along the clifftop also became popular. In 1827, the Cliff Bridge Company was given ownership of the spa and cliff in exchange for constructing the Cliff Bridge. In 1839, George Wyatt laid out a promenade at the foot of the cliff, and gradually developed gardens on them.

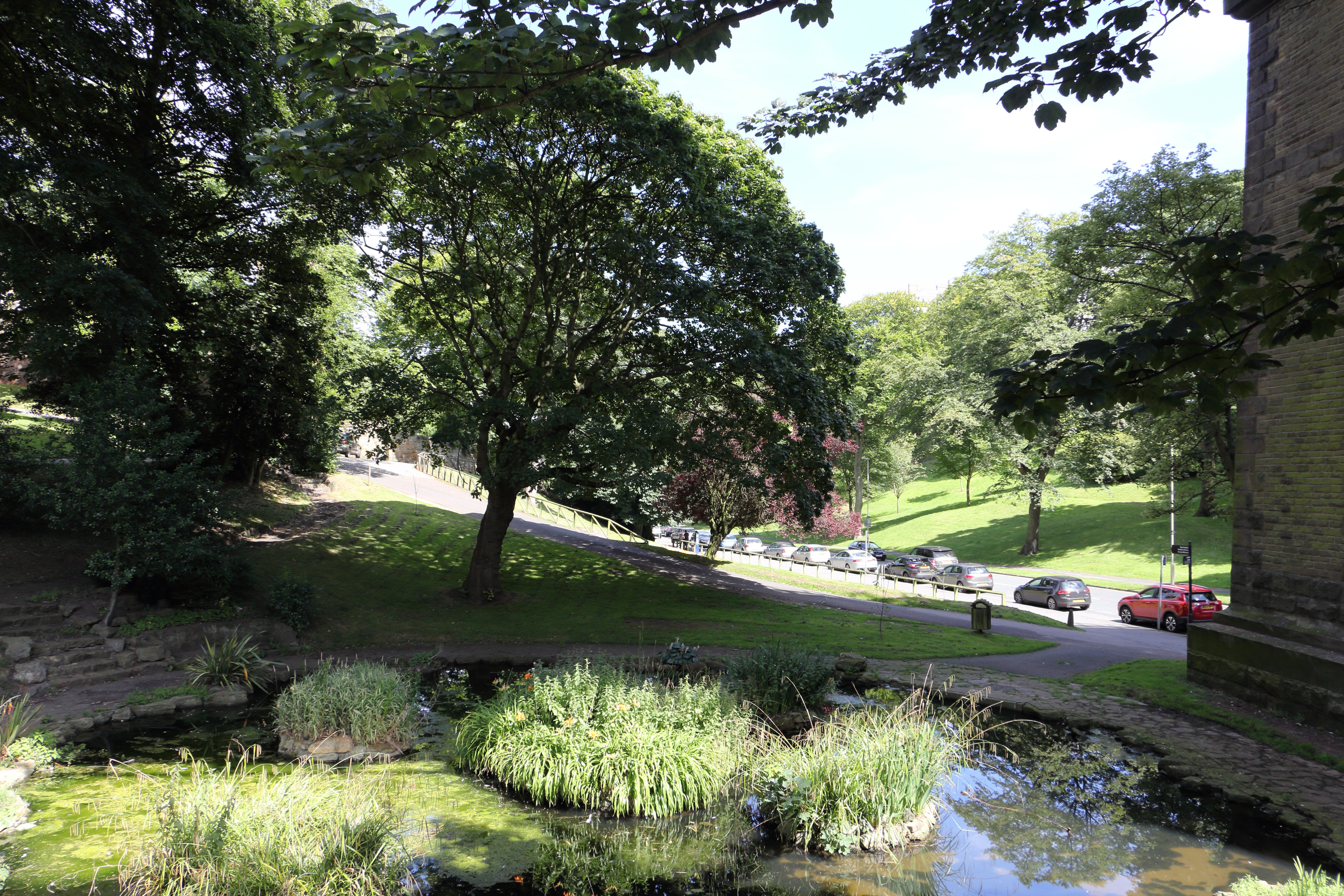
Valley Gardens

In 1856, Joseph Paxton began work on the gardens, laying out formal flower beds in an Italian style. He also extended the promenade and built a Grand Hall, Swiss Chalet, bandstand, summer house and stone stairs. In 1862, the Scarborough Corporation laid out the "People's Park" in the valley at the north end of the South Cliff Gardens. It incorporated a former mill pond and rockeries. This later became known as the "Valley Gardens" or "Valley Park". The park is now known for its flowerbeds and display of daffodils.

The Esplanade was built at the top of the cliff, and in 1874 the South Cliff Lift was built. The Grand Hall burnt down in 1876, but a replacement was completed in 1880. Around this time, the Holbeck Gardens were laid out to the south of South Cliff Gardens, and George Lord Beeforth funded the construction of a rose garden, tennis court and walks in the gardens. From about 1910, they were incorporated into the South Cliff Gardens, and Harry W. Smith altered the layout, including a new Italian garden. In 1911, Alfred Shuttleworth donated a clock tower and some additional land, which included miniature gardens. Following landslides at the southern end of the site, boulders were imported to reduce erosion. The gardens were grade II listed in 2001. They were restored in 2023, the work including reopening of a tunnel under the lift, an accessible path, a new playground, and a new community hub named Beeforth's Hive.

== Architecture ==
=== Swiss Chalet ===
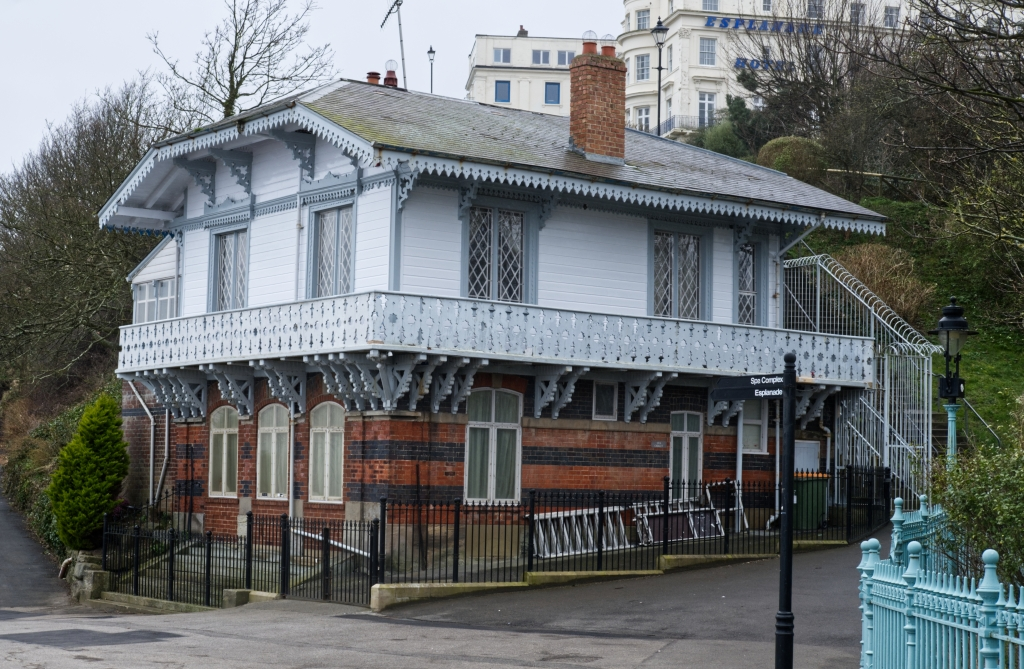
The Swiss Chalet

The Swiss Chalet, designed by Paxton, is grade II listed. The ground floor is in red and grey banded brick, the upper floor is weatherboarded, and it has a hipped slate roof, with overhanging eaves and fretted bargeboards. Above the ground floor is a fretted balcony on shaped carved paired brackets. The windows have diamond glazing and architraves, and the door on the upper floor is approached by external steps.

=== Gates ===
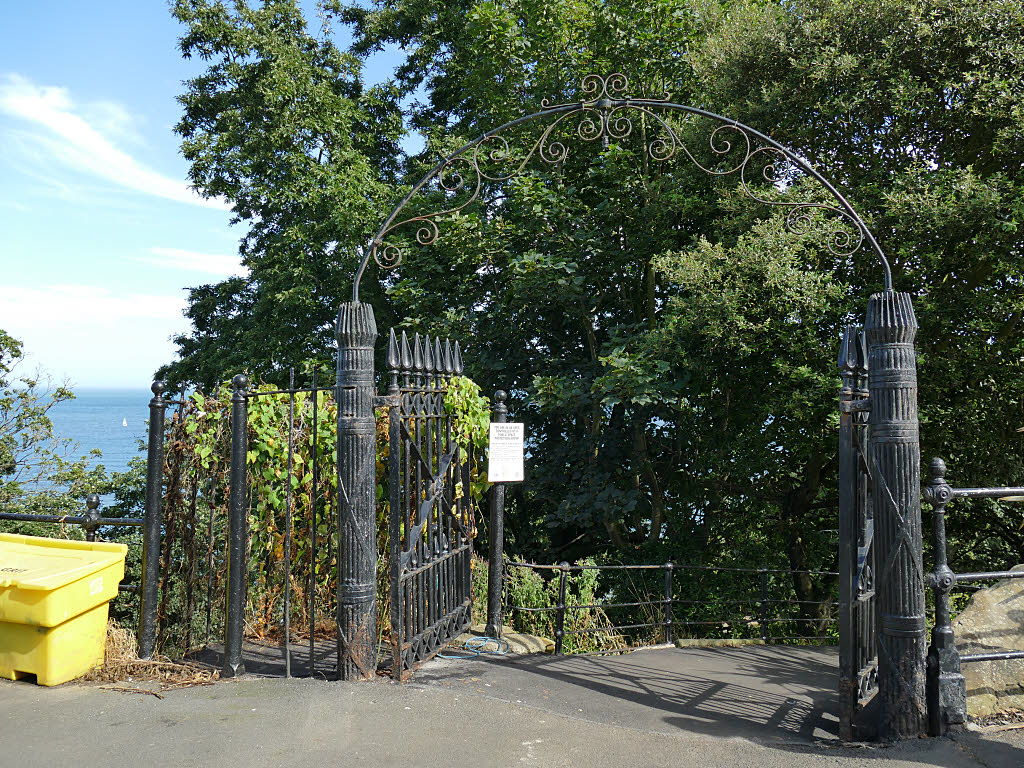
The gates

The gateway to South Cliff Gardens from the northern end of the Esplanade is made of cast iron, and it contains double gates with spear head rails and spear head dog rails. The piers are in the form of a bundle of pikes, and between them is an overthrow with scrollwork.

=== Shelter ===
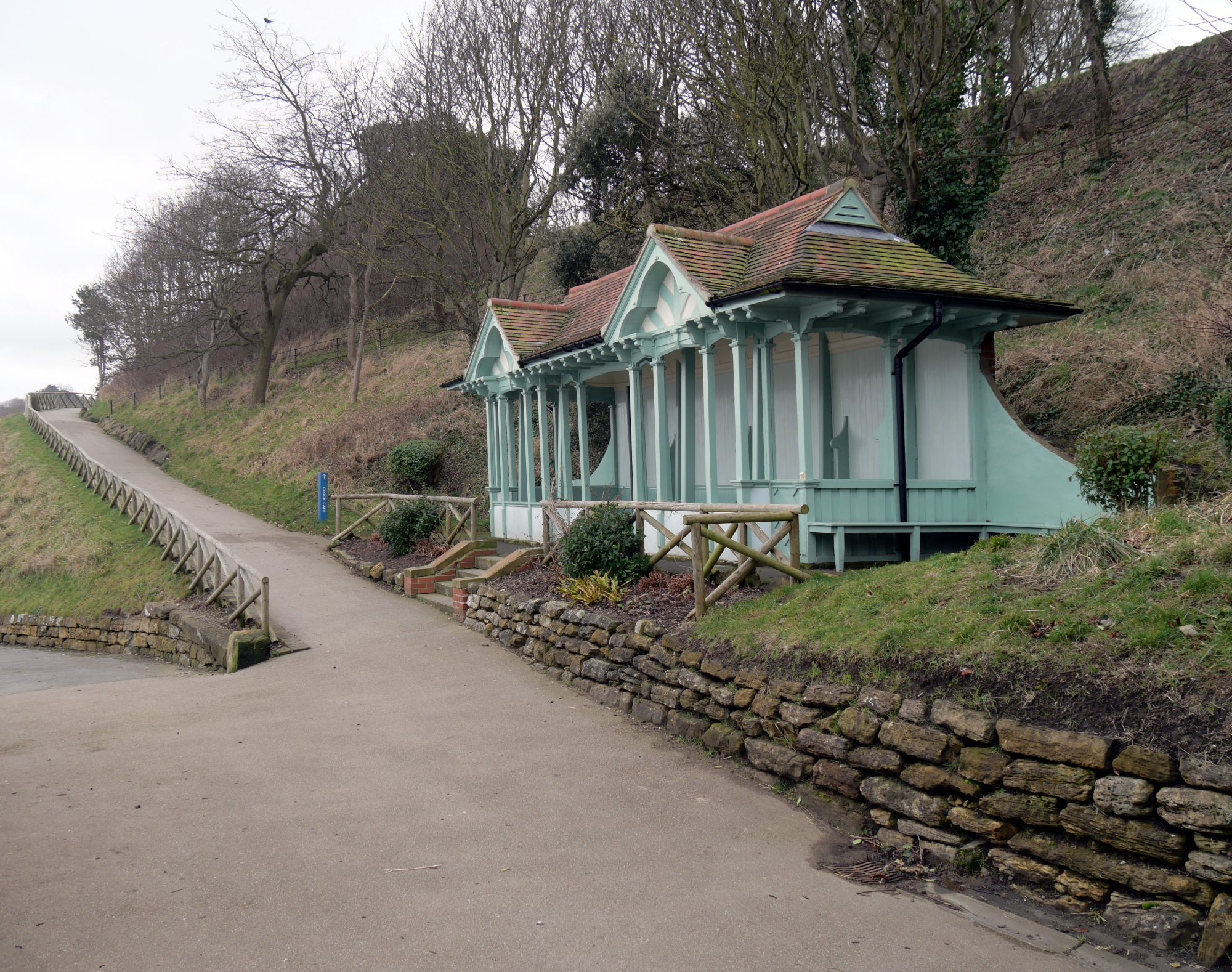
The shelter

The shelter, built around 1900, is also grade II listed. It is built of timber with a stuccoed red brick rear wall and a swept tile roof. The entrance is in the centre, and there are two gables on timber posts with shaped brackets, trefoil-arched fascia boards, panelled soffits and half-timber panelling. Inside, there is a continuous wooden bench.

=== Holbeck Clock Tower ===
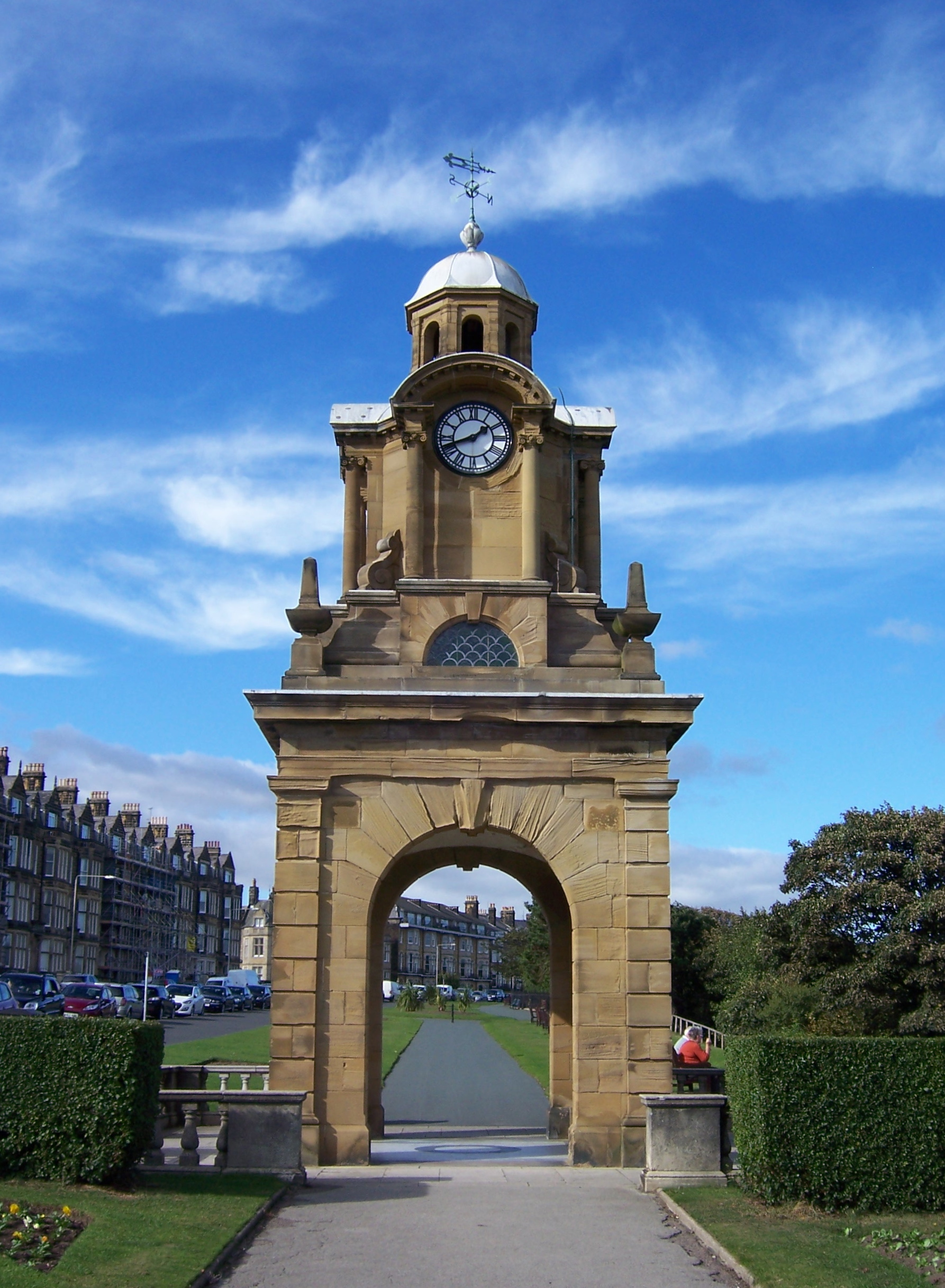
The clock tower

The grade II-listed tower was donated to mark the Coronation of George V. It is on a balustraded terrace on the Esplanade, at the main entrance to the park. It has a square lower stage with arched openings, rusticated pilasters, and an entablature with obelisk finials on the corners. The clock stage is octagonal with Ionic columns, clock faces, and segmental pediments, above which is an octagonal cupola with arched openings and a lead roof.

=== Beach huts and cafe ===
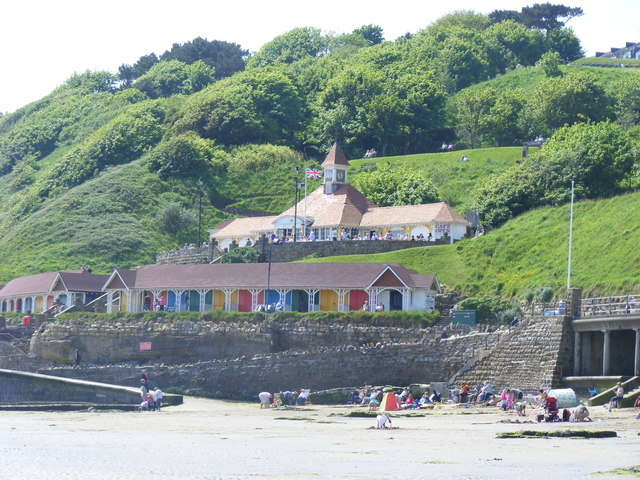
The cafe

The huts are in terraces or single, they are in timber, and have French doors, open latticework timber verandas and tile roofs. The café is at a higher level, and has a projecting central block of three bays, and a hipped roof surmounted by a clock tower with a pyramidal roof and an ornate weathervane. The entrance bay has a dentilled segmental pediment on an entablature. The central block is flanked by single-storey three-bay wings, each containing a blind arcade of open latticework. The building is grade II listed and was built between 1911 and 1912.

== See also ==
- Listed buildings in Scarborough (Ramshill Ward)
- Listed buildings in Scarborough (Weaponness and Falsgrave Park Wards)
- Listed parks and gardens in Yorkshire and the Humber
