= Holy Trinity Church, Scarborough =

Church building in Scarborough, North Yorkshire, England

Coordinates: 54.2735°N 0.4090°W

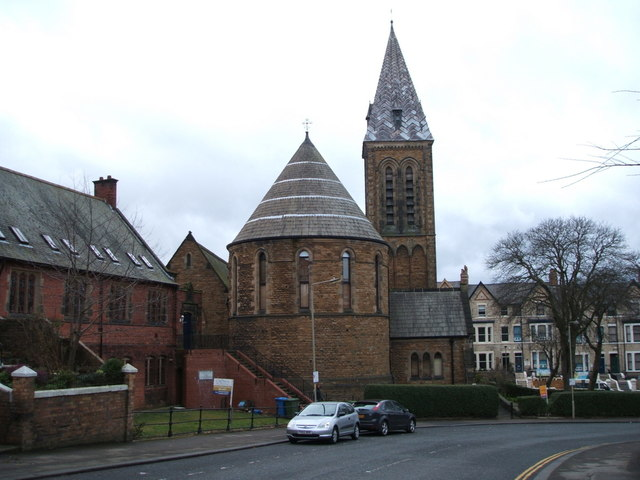
The building, in 2016

Holy Trinity Church is a former church in Scarborough, North Yorkshire, a town in England.

The Anglican church was built in 1879, to a design by Ewan Christian. It is in a 13th-century Gothic revival style. The church closed in the 1980s, and in 1990 its benefice was united with that of St James' Church, which was rededicated as St James with Holy Trinity Church. In 1998, the fixtures were removed, including stained glass by Charles Eamer Kempe, and in 2001, the building was converted into flats. The building has been grade II listed since 1973.

The church is built of sandstone with a slate roof, and consists of a nave and a chancel in one unit with a clerestory, north and south aisles, a south vestry and a polygonal parish room, and a northwest tower. The tower has three stages, and contains a north doorway with a pointed arch with a cusped circle in the tympanum, and on the west side is a polygonal turret. The middle stage contains lancet windows, the bell openings have two lights, and above is a tall pyramidal spire with lucarnes. The north aisle has four gabled bays, each containing three stepped lancet windows.

== See also ==
- Listed buildings in Scarborough (Ramshill Ward)
