= St Martin's Vicarage =

Clergy house in Scarborough, North Yorkshire, England

Coordinates: 54.2745°N 0.4015°W

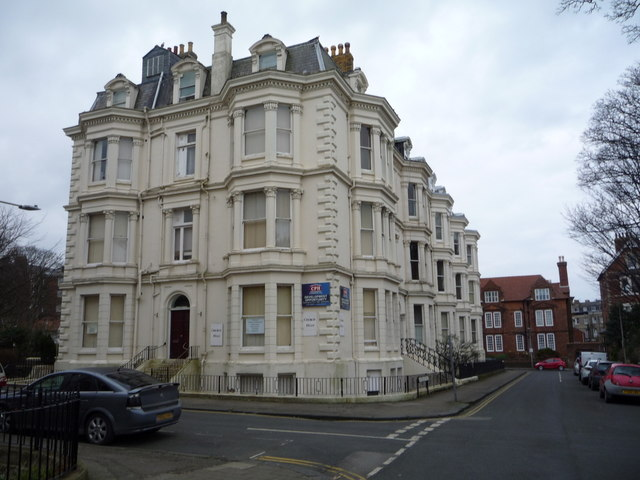
St Martin's Square; the vicarage is the red brick building in the distance

St Martin's Vicarage is a historic building in Scarborough, North Yorkshire, a town in England.

The house was constructed as the vicarage of St Martin-on-the-Hill, Scarborough. Some sources date it to 1863, but Nikolaus Pevsner argues that it must be later, as inside there is stained glass by Charles Eamer Kempe, which was manufactured around 1889. Like the church, it was designed by G. F. Bodley, but is in the Queen Anne style, similar to work by Norman Shaw. The building was grade II* listed in 1973.

The vicarage is built of red brick, with moulded dressings, a string course and a tile roof. It has two storeys and attics, Three of the bays project under pediments and contain small-pane sash windows, and above each bay is a gable containing a window, over which is a pediment. Between the left two bays is a doorway, above which is a carved panel and a pediment.

== See also ==
- Grade II* listed buildings in North Yorkshire (district)
- Listed buildings in Scarborough (Ramshill Ward)
