= Central Tramway Company, Scarborough =

Funicular tramway in Scarborough, North Yorkshire, England

Coordinates: 54°16′51″N 00°23′50″W

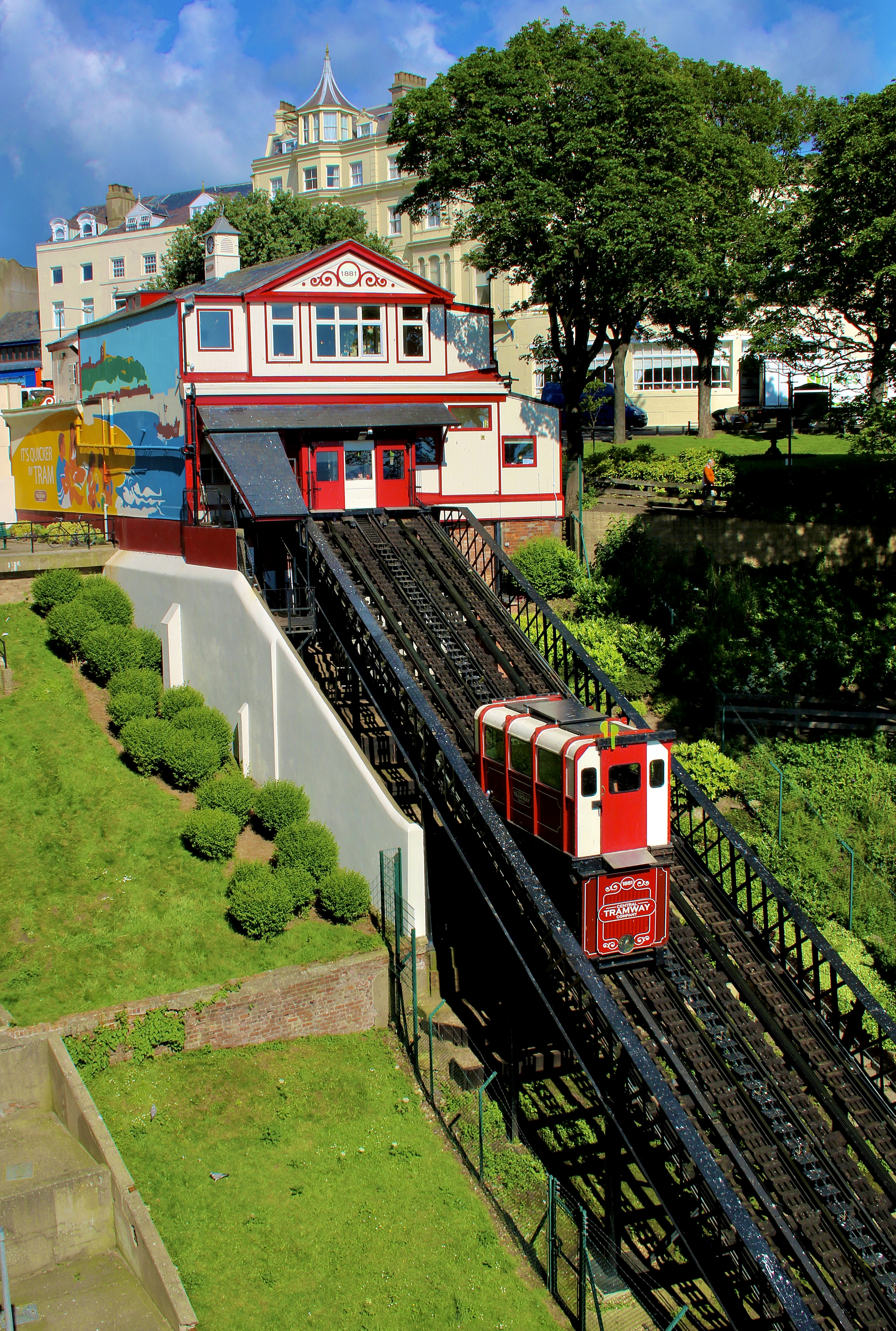
Central Tramway Company, Scarborough. June 2019. View of the top station, Grand carriage and tracks.

The Central Tramway Company is an electric-powered funicular railway located in the holiday resort of Scarborough, North Yorkshire. The company has the distinction of being the oldest surviving Tramway Company in the UK, as the original corporation still operates the funicular today. Built in just 6 months between January and August 1881, the Tramway opened on Monday 1 August becoming the 3rd such cliff railway to operate in the borough.

The distinctive burgundy and cream carriages travel up and down the 248-foot (76 m) track between the bottom station on Foreshore Road, next to the beach and tourist arcades, and the top station on Marine Parade, close to the town centre.

== History ==
=== Origin ===
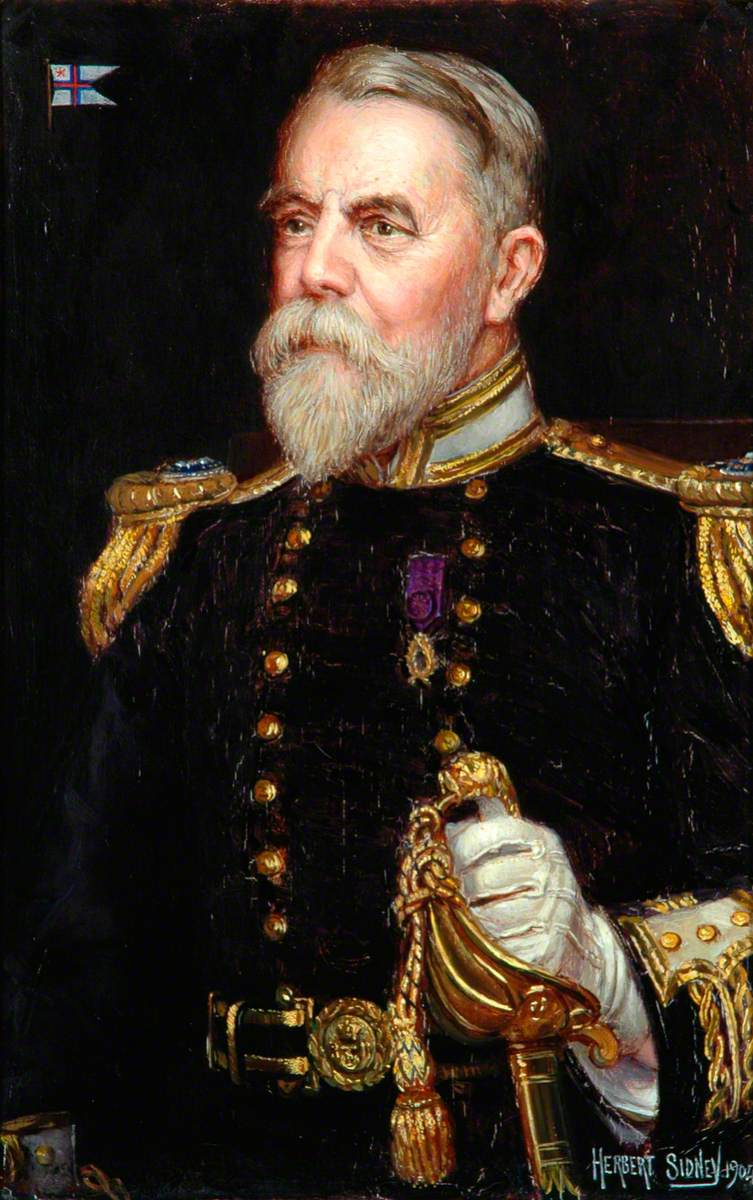
John Woodall Woodall

Scarborough developed from a fishing town into a busy spa town and tourist resort through the 18th and 19th centuries, thanks in part to the discovery of the acidic water running into the South Bay by Thomasin Farrer in the 17th century. Visitors were drawn to the town for the health benefits of both the spa water and the therapeutic benefits of the sea air and fresh water swimming. Entertainment soon followed, and The Spa, Scarborough developed into a popular centre for music and performance.

The development of the railway line and central station in 1845 bought a modest increase in the number of wealthy visitors to the area. The Grand Hotel (Scarborough) was a lavish addition to the Scarborough landscape. Completed in 1867 to much fanfare it was heralded as one of the biggest hotels in the world and one of the first giant purpose built hotels in Europe. (It was famously saved from the German bombs in the Second World War because Hitler selected it as a future home and base after the war).

Scarborough's topography was such that many of the newly developed hotels were located atop the steep cliff that made up the area's natural coastline. The Spa, beach and entertainment were to be found at the bottom of the hill, a long and arduous walk made more challenging by the clothing of the period.

The first cliff railway to be built in Great Britain was the South Cliff Tramway (now called the Spa Cliff Lift), Scarborough in 1875, and the first of five Scarborough funiculars to be built between 1875 and 1930. The Scarborough South Cliff Tramway Company Limited was created in 1873 to link the hotels of the South Cliff Esplanade with the panoramic South Bay beach and entertainment venue of the Spa. A group of local business owners, led by Mr Hunt of the nearby Prince of Wales Hotel, joined together to form the company with a starting capital of £4,500 from shares sold in the company. It opened on 6 July 1875, eventually costing £8000 and was an instant success with 1,400 passengers travelling on the day of opening.

The project was perhaps inspired by the development of a counterbalance railway on a steep stretch of the Pickering to Whitby railway line (now part of the North Yorkshire Moors Railway ) between nearby Goatland and Grosmont. Too steep to be pulled by the horses, a system was designed using a descending wheeled water tank similar to those used in the slate quarries of North Wales from the late 18th century onwards.

The success of the South Cliff Tramway Company inspired another funicular to be developed in 1878 on the North Bay. The Queens Parade Cliff Lift unfortunately did not enjoy the same good fortune with a series of accidents and issues with erosion on this particular stretch of coastline. Eventually being closed for good in 1887. Two further cliff railways were subsequently constructed in Scarborough; the St Nicholas Cliff Lift in 1929 and the North Cliff Lift in 1930. Central Tramway and the Spa Cliff Lift are the only lifts still operating in Scarborough today.

John Woodall Woodall was a successful businessman in Scarborough during this time. A Fellow of the Royal Society, a banker, marine biologist, benefactor and 4 times mayor of Scarborough, Woodall had a distinguished background as well as owning large areas of Scarborough. His family home was St Nicholas House (now the Town Hall) prominently located overlooking the South Bay and the newly built Grand Hotel.

John Woodall Woodall was to be the first Chairman of the Central Tramway Company registering the corporation in January 1881. The company followed the financial model of the South Cliff Tramway Company with £10,000 worth of shares (2,000 of £5 shares) being sold to individuals, including Robert Laughton of the Victoria Hotel, father of the actor Charles Laughton.

=== Construction ===
John Woodall Woodall owned the land that the Central Tramway was to be built on and arrangements had to be made for a small photographic studio to be relocated into the new station building. George Wood of Hull was the contractor, Charles Augustus Bury the architect and Thomas Feaster Morgan the chief engineer.

The track gauge is 4 ft 8 1/2 in (1,435 mm) with a length of 248 feet (76 m). The iron track was constructed on a lattice girder framework carried on iron columns. The original top station designed by Charles Augustus Bury, who also designed the Unitarian Church on Westborough, originally contained a spacious waiting room reached by a passage between two shops, with the photographic studio located above.

The railway was originally Steam powered so construction also included an engine house located 20 yards (18 m) from the top station beneath the tracks. The original plans reveal the 12 inches (300 mm) smoke flue that was constructed from the engine house for the purpose of allowing the smoke from the burning coal to be expelled away from the top station. The flue ran underground to the nearby Granby House, the home of 18th century historian Thomas Hinderwell.

Although the top station today has the same footprint as the original building, the bottom station was originally a larger building approximately 27 feet (8.2 m) in length. This was later reduced when the Foreshore Road was widened after 1949.

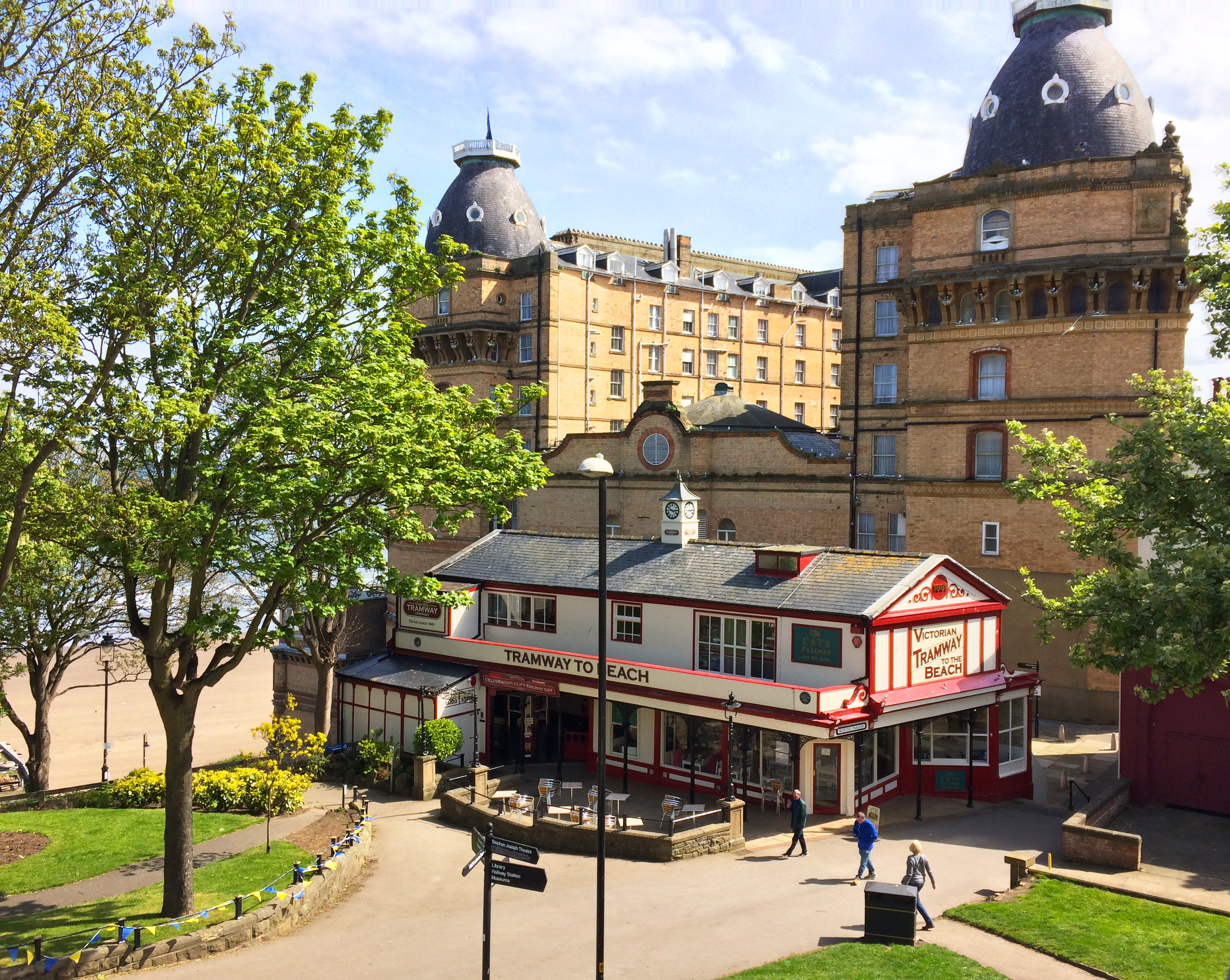
Central Tramway Company, Scarborough with the Grand Hotel visible in the background. May 2019.

The mechanism in the engine house was unique and used a colliery type indicator and chalk marks on the winch to inform the winding engineer when the cars had arrived at the station. This meant that the winding engineer did not have a view of the track.

This type of steam operation was unique at the time. The South Cliff Tramway of 1875 was originally operated by a hydraulic water balance system with sea water being pumped initially by two Crossley gas engines, later replaced by coal powered steam pumps in 1879. The short-lived Queen's Parade Lift of 1878 used a similar water balance system with steam powering the water pumps.

=== Operations ===
At 12.30 pm on 1 August 1881 the Central Tramway Company Ltd opened to the public for the first time with the first passenger-carrying ascent and descent of the carriages. The Scarborough Mercury at the time reported that the opening was 1 month later than anticipated. According to the company log book, 2,834 passengers travelled on the first day. A letter from the station manager to the Directors dated 5 August tells that it was a fortunate coincidence that the opening day fell on the Bank Holiday and in consequence was a very busy day. He wrote ‘I'm happy to be able to report that the working was satisfactory and the staff appointed proved sufficient’.

The first journey was taken by Chairman John Woodall Woodall along with several investors and directors of the company including GM Porter, A Lupton and ZT Wellburn; the architect Charles Augustus Bury; G Dippie the town clerk and Rev. J Benn. According to the Scarborough Mercury the group travelled from the top station down to the bottom station, alighted briefly before returning to the top station where Woodall Woodall addressed the gathered crowd.

The steam operation continued into the early 20th century with one notable incident. On 24 October 1908, Percy Henry Askham was delivering coal for the steam engine. The coal shoot was accessible from the tracks and according to the coroner's report the driver did not see Mr Askham working on the track, setting the carriages in motion. As the Tram moved down the tracks Mr Askham was knocked backwards into the coal shed. He died later in hospital.

In 1920 the Tramway was converted to electric power making use of the road tram system that had been constructed in 1904 around Scarborough. The Scarborough Tramways Company was formed in 1902 by Scarborough Corporation. Over the proceeding 2 years the company built a 5-mile system of tracks around the streets of Scarborough.

The Central Tramway Company made use of the electricity power system constructed by the main contractor, Edmundson Electrical Corporation, which operated from the main power station on Seamer Road.

The new electric winding gear ran off the 500v Direct current power of the road tram system from 1920 until the road trams eventually closed in 1931.

Between 1931 and 1932 Hudswell Clarke and Company of Leeds converted the system to AC power with the installation of a new 60 horse power motor underneath the top station, during this time they also relaid the track, and rebuilt the carriage frames with new wooden carriages being supplied by Plaxtons.

Further changes occurred during the second half of the 20th century. In 1967 a solid reinforced concrete foundation was laid under the track (still visible today), with the exception of the top 30 yards (27 m). In 1975 a significant fire at the Olympia Amusement site damaged one of the carriages and tracks. Two new aluminium carriages were supplied by George Neville Truck Equipment of Kirkby in Ashfield.

The future of the Tramway was further put in jeopardy in 1976 when pile driving at the new Olympia Amusement site caused cracking and damage to the concrete foundation supporting the track. The Tramway did not operate for a full year, while repairs were made. The company took the contractors to court and won full compensation for the remedial work and all consequential losses.

In 2009 the company installed a fully automated drive system, with a new 60 horse power electric motor with the objective of enabling a smooth acceleration and deceleration into and out of the stations. This automation took away dependency on manual driving, and consequently improved the safe operation of the facility. In 2016, the Company installed a new hydraulic disc brake, manufactured by Twiflex Ltd.

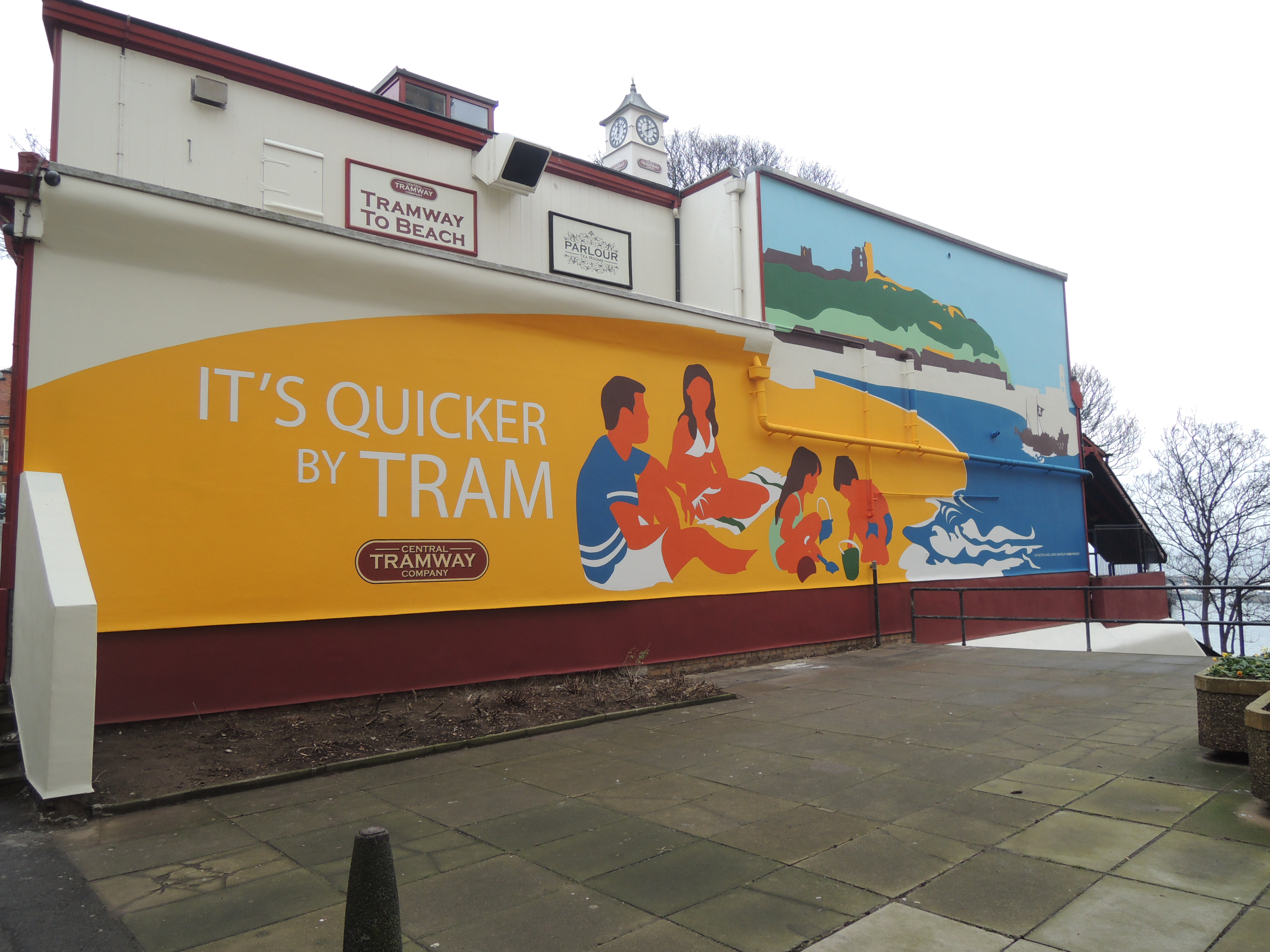
Central Tramway Mural Scarborough

Between 2012 and 2020 the Central Tramway underwent a significant refurbishment of the interior and exterior of the Station buildings. These works were based on a report commissioned by the company from local architects, Denton and Denton in 2011. The report recommended the company make more of the many Victorian period features still in operation.

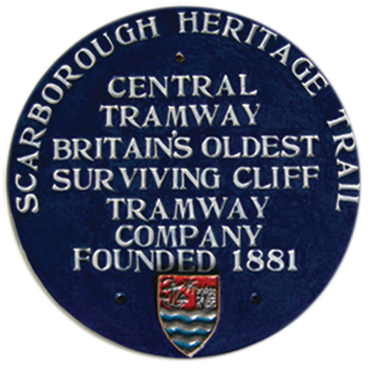
Scarborough Civic Society Heritage Blue Plaque marking Central Tramway as the oldest surviving Tramway Company in the UK

The result was a return to the burgundy and cream livery and the installation of several distinctive features, these included the clock tower and stained glass panels above the driver's booth. Two large murals were also painted on the bottom and upper station walls, the latter being a modern homage to 1930s railway posters designed by local artist-designer Adrian Riley (Electric Angel Design).

In July 2012, The Mayor of the Borough of Scarborough, Councillor Helen Mallory unveiled a Scarborough Civic Society Heritage Blue plaque to acknowledge the contribution of the Central Tramway to Scarborough's social and industrial heritage. This can now be seen above the entrance to the café at the top station.

== Engineering ==
The Central Tramway is a funicular railway, the principle of which is that two carriages are permanently attached to each other by means of steel hauling ropes, or cables. As one carriage ascends, the other carriage will descend.

The two tracks run between the top station on Marine Parade, and the bottom station on Foreshore Road. Each track is 248 feet or 75m long. The 2 carriages are named Grand and Olympia for operational and engineering purposes. Each carriage is constructed from an aluminium outer shell on a steel frame. The triangular base frame is similar to those of the water balance railways but does not contain the water tank beneath the carriage. Access to both carriages is via sliding doors on the ends.

At Central Tramway 4 hauling cables are attached to the two carriages, these are special high strength, compacted cables, each one 19 mm in diameter, with a breaking strength of 32 tonnes, therefore the four cables are capable of carrying 128 tonnes. The two carriages, can carry up to 20 passengers seated and 10 standing, and when fully loaded each can weigh up to 8 tonnes, or 16 tonnes in total, well within the capacity of the 128 tonne breaking strength.

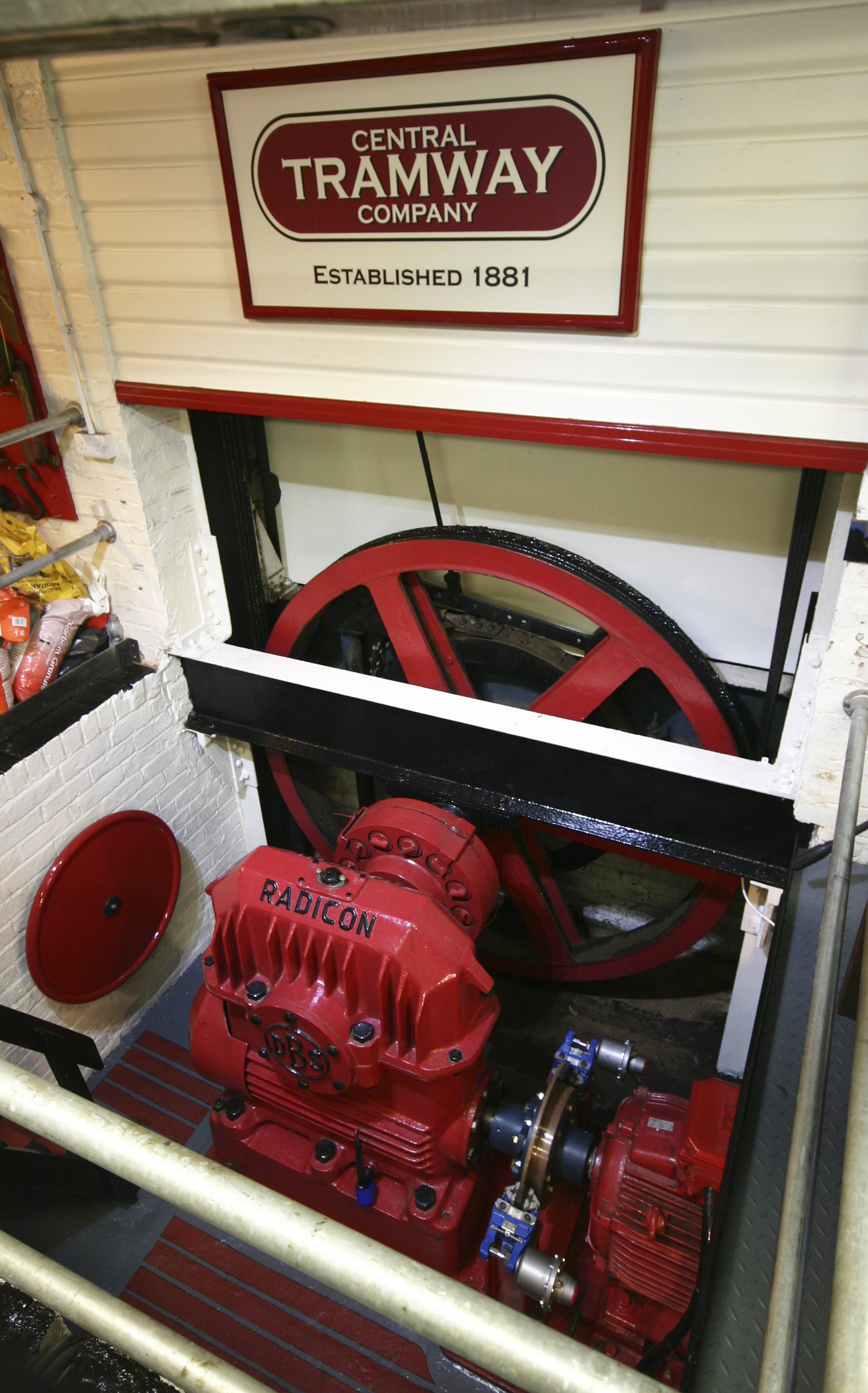
The sheave wheel, gear box and motor located in the machine room below the top station. May 2019.

The driver sits in the booth at the top station with full sight of both carriages (CCTV screens also allow full view of the bottom and top stations where passengers alight and disembark). The system is powered by a 60 horse power electric motor, the motor drives a David Brown 17 inch gear-box, which then rotates the 7 ft diameter main pulley or sheave wheel. Gravity aids in the movement of the carriages making the Tramway very energy efficient.

In 2019 a new Programmable logic controller drive system was installed by Wheel Sets (UK) Ltd in preparation for the 2020 season. The new system uses the latest in computer technology to monitor and control the movement of the carriages with comprehensive integrated safety systems to improve the smooth and safe running of the railway. New digital control panels allow clear and concise information to be relayed to the driver.

A new hydraulic disc brake mounted on the main sheave wheel was installed in January 2020.

Between January and May 2022, Central Tramway undertook a major modernisation and rebuild of its two trams and chassis. The contracting engineering company was Wheel Sets (UK) Ltd, Rotherham, South Yorkshire. The chassis that were originally installed in 1932, were replaced with new galvanised steel chassis. The opportunity was also taken to install new spring applied emergency brakes, two on each chassis. These deploy in the unlikely event of the carriages becoming detached from the haulage ropes or an over-speed event triggered from an axle driven digital encoder. The new emergency braking system was integrated with the PLC control system installed in 2019. The tram's battery powered electrical system was also upgraded.

The two aluminium carriages dating from the 1975 upgrade were dismantled and refurbished at the same time. The old paint was removed by aluminium powder blasting, followed by a seven coat Polyurethane paint system. The tram carriages were also rewired and upgraded with a new internal and external lighting system.

== Health and safety ==
The regulatory body responsible for the oversight of funicular railways in the UK is HM Inspectorate of Mines (HMIM), a division of the Health and Safety Executive. The HMIM hold meetings twice per annum with all funicular operators as part of their supervisory activities, and pay periodic visits to all the funiculars. Central Tramway complies with the Lifting Operations and Lifting Equipment Regulations 1998 (LOLER), and is inspected every six months to guarantee compliance.
