= Listed buildings in Scarborough (Ramshill Ward) =

Ramshill Ward is a ward in the town of Scarborough, North Yorkshire, England. It contains 18 listed buildings that are recorded in the National Heritage List for England. Of these, one is listed at Grade I, the highest of the three grades, four are at Grade II*, the middle grade, and the others are at Grade II, the lowest grade. The ward is to the south of the centre of the town, and is mainly residential, and it also provides holiday accommodation. Most of the listed buildings are houses in terraces, and hotels, and the others include churches, one used for other purposes, a gateway, a funicular railway, a seaside shelter, and a former hairdresser's shop.

== Key ==
Grade	Criteria
I	Buildings of exceptional interest, sometimes considered to be internationally important
II*	Particularly important buildings of more than special interest
II	Buildings of national importance and special interest

== Buildings ==
Name and location	Photograph	Date	Notes	Grade
Esplanade Hotel; 54.27777°N 0.39938°W		c. 1830–40	The hotel is stuccoed with a rusticated ground floor, and has a frieze, modified Corinthian pilasters, a projecting moulded cornice, a moulded coped parapet, and a slate mansard roof. There are four storeys, a slightly curved plan and fronts of 18 bays. Most of the windows are recessed sashes in architraves. On the south front are bow windows in two and four storeys, and above the ground floor is a continuous iron balcony. In the centre of the north front is a modern entrance.	II
5 Filey Road and 2 Fulford Road; 54.27207°N 0.40310°W	—	c. 1840	A house on a corner site in red brick on a stone plinth, with eaves on stone brackets, a sill course, and a hipped slate roof. There are two storeys and a basement, a front of four bays and three bays on the south front, which has a central Greek Doric porch with pilasters, and a door with an oblong fanlight. The windows are a mix of sashes and casements, and at the rear is a two-storey canted bay window.	II
20–29 The Esplanade; 54.27501°N 0.39887°W		c. 1840	A terrace of ten stuccoed houses, the ground floor and basements rusticated, with a frieze and a moulded cornice. There are three storeys, basements and attics, the end house has four storeys, and most houses have three bays. Steps lead to the doorways, most with semicircular fanlights, and the windows are recessed sashes. Along the middle floor are iron balconies, some houses also have balconies on the top floor, and some balconies have canopies with tent roofs.	II
2–9 Albion Road; 54.27574°N 0.40044°W		c. 1840–50	Nine houses, part of a terrace, they are stuccoed, with rusticated ground floors, sill courses, a frieze, a projecting moulded cornice, a blocking course and a panelled parapet. There are three storeys and basements, and each house has two bays. Steps lead up to each doorway that has an oblong fanlight, above which is a French window and a sash window. The other bay contains a full height segmental bow window, the windows on the top floor with a panelled apron, and on the middle floor with an iron balcony. The steps and basement areas have splayed spear head railings.	II
Gates to the cliff 54.27690°N 0.39886°W		c. 1840–50	The gateway is in cast iron, and it contains double gates with spear head rails and spear head dog rails. The piers are in the form of a bundle of pikes, and between them is an overthrow with scrollwork.	II
Prince of Wales Apartments; 54.27437°N 0.39879°W		c. 1840–50	The terraced block is stuccoed, and the ground floor is rusticated. There are iron balconies over the ground floor, and Corinthian plasters rising to a cornice. There are four storeys and basements, and on the front, steps with railings lead up to three doorways. The windows are sash windows, and at the left end is a four-storey canted bay window.	II
Villa Esplanade; 54.27569°N 0.39936°W		c. 1840–50	The house, at one time a hotel, is stuccoed and has a slate roof, two storeys and attics, and an irregular plan. On the south front is a five-storey tower with a pyramidal roof, and a circular stair turret with a conical roof, the latter containing narrow round-headed windows divided by colonnettes. Elsewhere, there are canted and square two-storey bay windows, with mullions, panelled parapets, some with iron balconies, and gabled dormers.	II
Wessex Court including the Crown Hotel; 54.27684°N 0.39974°W		1841–46	A row of terraced houses with a hotel in the centre, the building is stuccoed, with rusticated ground floor, a continuous balcony above the ground floor, a moulded cornice, and a panelled parapet. The hotel has four storeys, the middle four bays projecting with Greek Doric columns on the ground floor and Corinthian columns on the upper floors, above which is a pediment containing a crown motif. The flanking wings have three storeys and attics, and each house has three bays. The windows are sashes, and all the ground floor openings have round-arched heads, the doorways with semicircular fanlights.	II*
1–19 Crown Terrace; 54.27632°N 0.40095°W		c. 1850	A terrace of 19 stuccoed houses with bracketed moulded cornices and moulded eaves cornices. The middle four houses have three storeys, the others have two storeys, and all have attics and basements, and two bays. In each house, steps lead up to a round-headed doorway with a rusticated surround, an architrave and a semicircular fanlight, above which is a sash window in an eared architrave. The other bays contain a three or four-storey bow window, with rusticated Doric pilasters on the ground floor, and Corinthian pilasters above. The steps and basement areas have cast iron railings.	II
The Spa; 54.27579°N 0.39742°W		1858	The building was designed by Joseph Paxton, but it was badly damaged by fire in 1887, and was rebuilt and extended incorporating some original features. In the centre is a three-storey three-bay block containing the entrance. This is flanked by two-storey wings, each with nine bays containing round-arched openings, and at the ends are four three-storey towers. Along the front is a cast iron verandah on which is a balcony, and along the top is a balustraded parapet. The verandah continues as a single-storey range to the north.	II*
The Spa Chalet; 54.27847°N 0.39843°W		c. 1859–60	The building, in the form of a Swiss Chalet, was designed by Joseph Paxton. The ground floor is in red and grey banded brick, the upper floor is weatherboarded, and it has a hipped slate roof, with overhanging eaves and fretted bargeboards. Above the ground floor is a fretted balcony on shaped carved paired brackets. The windows have diamond glazing and architraves, and the door on the upper floor is approached by external steps.	II
St Martin's Church; 54.27506°N 0.40131°W		1861–62	The church, designed by G. F. Bodley, is built in sandstone. It consists of a nave with a clerestory, a west baptistry, north and south aisles, a south porch, a chancel with a vestry, a north Lady Chapel, and a north tower. The tower has buttresses, a north doorway with a pointed arch, slit windows, two-light bell openings and a saddleback roof. At the west end is a large rose window.	I
St Andrew's Church; 54.27498°N 0.40284°W		1864–65	The church, designed by Lockwood and Mawson, is built in stone. It consists of a nave with a clerestory, north and south transepts, a chancel, a southwest steeple, and a northwest apse. The steeple has a two-stage tower with buttresses and clock faces, on which are four crocketted pinnacles and a spire, and at the north end is a rose window.	II*
St Martin's Vicarage; 54.27454°N 0.40153°W	—	1866–67	The vicarage, designed by G. F. Bodley, is built in red brick, with moulded dressings, a string course and a tile roof. There are two storeys and attics, Three of the bays project under pediments and contain small-pane sash windows, and above each bay is a gable containing a window, over which is a pediment. Between the left two bays is a doorway, above which is a carved panel and a pediment.	II*
South Cliff Railway; 54.27423°N 0.39720°W		1875	The funicular railway has twin standard gauge tracks, and is counter-balanced with a gradient of 33 degrees. There are two railcars on triangular sub-frames. At the lower end is a station with ornamental iron columns and a hipped roof, with glazed screens, and a lower lean-to extension. At the top is a simple ticket booth.	II
Former Holy Trinity Church; 54.27358°N 0.40904°W		1879	The church, which has been converted for residential use, was designed by Ewan Christian. It is in sandstone with a slate roof, and consists of a nave and a chancel in one unit with a clerestory, north and south aisles, a south vestry and a polygonal parish room, and a northwest tower. The tower has three stages, and contains a north doorway with a pointed arch with a cusped circle in the tympanum, and on the west side is a polygonal turret. The middle stage contains lancet windows, the bell openings have two lights, and above is a tall pyramidal spire with lucarnes. The north aisle has four gabled bays, each containing three stepped lancet windows.	II
Seaside shelter 54.27695°N 0.39824°W		Late 19th to early 20th century	The shelter in South Cliff Gardens is in timber with a stuccoed red brick rear wall and a swept tile roof. The entrance is in the centre, and there are two gables on timber posts with shaped brackets, trefoil-arched fascia boards, panelled soffits and half-timber panelling. Inside, there is a continuous wooden bench.	II
Former Francis hairdresser's shop 54.27493°N 0.39975°W	—	Mid-1930s	A town house converted into a hairdresser's shop in about 1930, and later used for other purposes. Only the shopfront and fittings are included in the listing. The shop extends from the house, it has a recessed central doorway, a window to the right, and on the left is the doorway to the house. Above this is a cornice, and a fascia with lettering in art deco style. Inside are original fittings and five timber-panelled booths. At the rear is a large mullioned and transomed window.	II
