= Listed buildings in Scarborough (Weaponness and Falsgrave Park Wards) =

Weaponness and Falsgrave Park Wards are wards in the town of Scarborough, North Yorkshire, England. They contain ten listed buildings that are recorded in the National Heritage List for England. All the listed buildings are designated at Grade II, the lowest of the three grades, which is applied to "buildings of national importance and special interest". The wards are to the south of the centre of the town, and are mainly residential and recreational. The single listed building in Falsgrave Park Ward is St James with Holy Trinity Church, and all the others are in Weaponness Ward. These consist of large houses, sports buildings, a college, a clock tower, beach huts and a café, and a war memorial.

== Buildings ==
Name and location	Photograph	Date	Notes
Former Bramcote Tennis Pavilion; 54.26988°N 0.39761°W		1885	The sports pavilion is timber framed with rendered brick infill on the front, and in red brick at the rear, it has a hipped tile roof with terracotta cresting, and is in Arts and Crafts Tudor style. There is a single storey and a partial attic, and a complex form. One changing room has an apse, the other has a gable with an attic, and the hall is open to the south as a verandah.
St James with Holy Trinity Church; 54.27377°N 0.41575°W		1885	The church, in Falsgrave Park Ward, was designed by Austin and Paley, and the aisles were added by them in 1894. It is built in brick with stone dressings and has roofs in tile and lead. The church consists of a nave, side aisles, a chancel, a west porch and vestry, and an undercroft with a schoolroom. On the east end of the south aisle is a bell tower with three stages, each containing a bell opening, and at the top is a slate roof and a spire with a fish-shaped weathervane.
Scarborough College; 54.26457°N 0.39673°W		1898	The college was designed by Edwin Cooper, and is mainly in red brick. The south front has eight bays, two storeys and attics. The west end is canted, and there is a projecting gabled wing to the east. The main block has a segmental-arched stone cloister arcade, with a central gate house feature containing tapering octagonal turrets. The upper floor windows have stone surrounds, and above are gabled dormers.
Dunollie; 54.26893°N 0.40063°W	—	1901	A large house designed by A. J. Penty, it is in red brick with stone dressings, moulded and decorated eaves, and a hipped Cumberland slate roof. Most of the windows are sashes, and there are dormer. The east front has a central block of five bays, and projecting three-bay wings. In the centre is a colonnnade with pairs of Ionic columns, a plain entablature and a balustrade. The doorway has a segmental fanlight and flanking half-columns. The wings contain pilaster strips, and the windows have keystones. The south front has a two-storey canted bay window with a balcony, a balustrade and a hipped roof. At the southwest is a conservatory and a mullioned and transomed window.
Brackencliffe; 54.26846°N 0.39346°W	—	1905	The house was designed by Walter Brierley in Arts and Crafts Tudor style. It is in brick, with stone dressings and tile roofs. There are two storeys and attics, and gables, one crow-stepped. Most of the windows are mullioned, and there are two-storey canted bay windows. The doorway has a moulded surround and a four-centred arch. On the east front is a three-arched loggia.
Red Court; 54.26927°N 0.39491°W		1906	A large house on a corner site, it is in red brick on a plinth, with a stone cornice and an embattled parapet. There are two storeys and attics. On the corners are half-octagonal turrets with shaped copper domes. Each front has a segmental balcony on a recessed round-headed arch, and the windows are sashes. The west front has a five-bay extension ending in a canted bay window. On the north side is a conservatory with Ionic columns, an entablature and a balustraded parapet.
Clock tower 54.26950°N 0.39431°W		1911	The clock tower, celebrating the Coronation of George V, is on a balustraded terrace on the Esplanade. It has a square lower stage with arched openings, rusticated pilasters, and an entablature with obelisk finials on the corners. The clock stage is octagonal with Ionic columns, clock faces, and segmental pediments, above which is an octagonal cupola with arched openings and a lead roof.
Beach huts and café 54.27339°N 0.39609°W		1911–12	The beach huts and café are in South Cliff Gardens. The huts are in terraces or single, they are in timber, and have French doors, open latticework timber verandas and tile roofs. The café is at a higher level, and has a projecting central block of three bays, and a hipped roof surmounted by a clock tower with a pyramidal roof and an ornate weathervane. The entrance bay has a dentilled segmental pediment on an entablature. The central block is flanked by single-storey three-bay wings, each containing a blind arcade of open latticework.
Tennis club house 54.26597°N 0.39926°W		1912	The club house at Scarborough Sports and Tennis Club was designed by Edwin Cooper, is in red brick, with brick quoins, a hipped grey slate roof, and a mainly timber rear wing. It has a single storey, attics and a partial basement, and a T-shaped plan with a central rear wing. In the centre, steps lead up to four pairs of columns, the outer ones square, behind which are recessed doorways. Flanking the centre, on each side, are three oval windows. Above, and breaking through the roof, are five dormers with multi-pane sash windows. In the centre of the rear wing is an octagonal turret with timber cladding.
War memorial 54.26814°N 0.40531°W		1923	The war memorial, on the highest point of Oliver's Mount, is in granite. It consists of a large obelisk on a square pedestal on a square base. On the pedestal and base are inscribed panels.
