= Wessex Court =

Terrace in Scarborough, North Yorkshire, England

Coordinates: 54.2768°N 0.3996°W

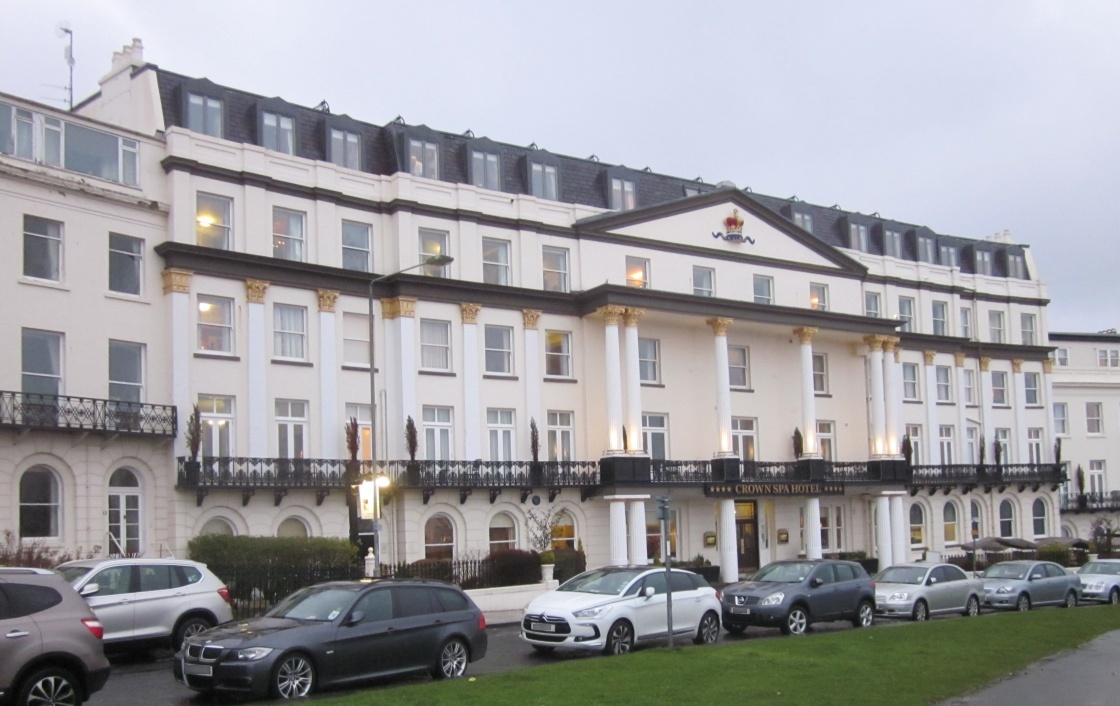
The Crown Hotel, at the centre of the terrace

Wessex Court is a historic terrace of buildings in Scarborough, North Yorkshire, a town in England.

The terrace was built in the 1840s, with the central section being the Crown Spa Hotel, and the wings being houses. The terrace was grade II* listed in 1953. Jimmy Savile purchased a flat in one of the buildings for the use of his mother, and after her death preserved it in her memory. Following Saville's death and the exposure of his crimes, the flat was purchased by the anti-child abuse campaigner Rodney Walker.

The building is stuccoed, with rusticated ground floor, a continuous balcony above the ground floor, a moulded cornice, and a panelled parapet. The hotel has four storeys, the middle four bays projecting with Greek Doric columns on the ground floor and Corinthian columns on the upper floors, above which is a pediment containing a crown motif. The flanking wings have three storeys and attics, and each house has three bays. The windows are sashes, and all the ground floor openings have round-arched heads, the doorways with semicircular fanlights. Many original features of the hotel survive, while in 2009, a rooftop extension was added.

== See also ==
- Grade II* listed buildings in North Yorkshire (district)
- Listed buildings in Scarborough (Ramshill Ward)
