= Crown Spa Hotel =

Hotel in Scarborough, North Yorkshire, England

Coordinates: 54.276800°N 0.399780°W

Crown Spa Hotel, Scarborough

Blue plaque on the building

The Crown Spa Hotel (formerly the Crown Hotel) is a large hotel in Scarborough, North Yorkshire, England, overlooking the town's South Bay. Built in 1844, it was Scarborough's first purpose-built hotel and has been extensively renovated to 21st-century four-star status. They lost their four-star status in 2023.

== History ==
The original Crown Hotel was reputedly designed by Malton architect John Gibson and opened by John Fairgray Sharpin on 10 June 1845. It was one of the first purpose-built hotels in the world as well as the first in Scarborough. It forms part of the Wessex Court terrace.

The hotel has been a location for television and film productions, including Little Voice, Heartbeat, The Royal, and A is for Acid.

The hotel lost its 1978 "four-star" rating in the 1990s and was purchased by a new owner in February 2000. Four-star status was restored in 2008. It then lost its "four-star" status again in 2023.

=== Redevelopment controversy ===
In 2005, the hotel overcame objections by local residents and secured approval for plans to increase its accommodation to 161 bedrooms. In 2007, there were successful public objections to decking and a gazebo erected in front of the hotel without planning permission, and to inappropriate artificial construction material.
