= Scarborough War Memorial =

War memorial in Scarborough, North Yorkshire, England

- Scarborough Borough Council
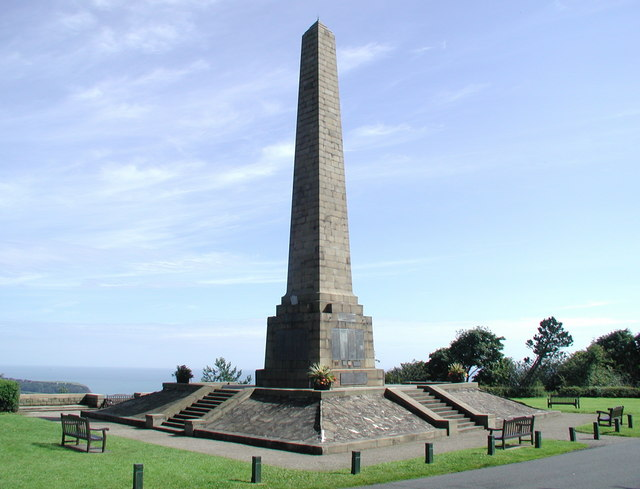
- For Civilians and servicemen killed in World War I and World War II and the Korean War
- Unveiled: 26 September 1923
- Location: 54.268211°N 0.405276°W; Scarborough, North Yorkshire, England
- "ERECTED/ BY VOLUNTARY SUBSCRIPTION/ FOUNDATION STONE LAID/ 16TH SEPTEMBER 1922/ UNVEILED 26TH SEPTEMBER 1923/ IN MEMORIAM/ PEOPLE OF SCARBOROUGH/ WHO GAVE THEIR LIVES IN THE/ SECOND WORLD WAR 1939-1945/ "GREATER LOVE HATH NO MAN THAN THIS"

Scarborough War Memorial is a war memorial at the north end of Oliver's Mount in the town of Scarborough in North Yorkshire. It is listed Grade II on the National Heritage List for England. The memorial consists of a stone obelisk atop a square pedestal on a square mound. 11 steps lead up to the obelisk.

It was dedicated on 26 September 1923 in a ceremony attended by Councillor William Boyes and Reverend J. Wynwayd Capron. It was later rededicated on 12 November 1950.

The memorial names 241 individuals who died in World War II and 70 who died in the Korean War. The 53 civilians of Scarborough who were killed in World War I and the 42 civilians who died in World War II are also named.

== See also ==
- Listed buildings in Scarborough (Weaponness and Falsgrave Park Wards)
