= Esplanade Hotel, Scarborough =

Building in Scarborough, North Yorkshire, England

Coordinates: 54.2777°N 0.3993°W

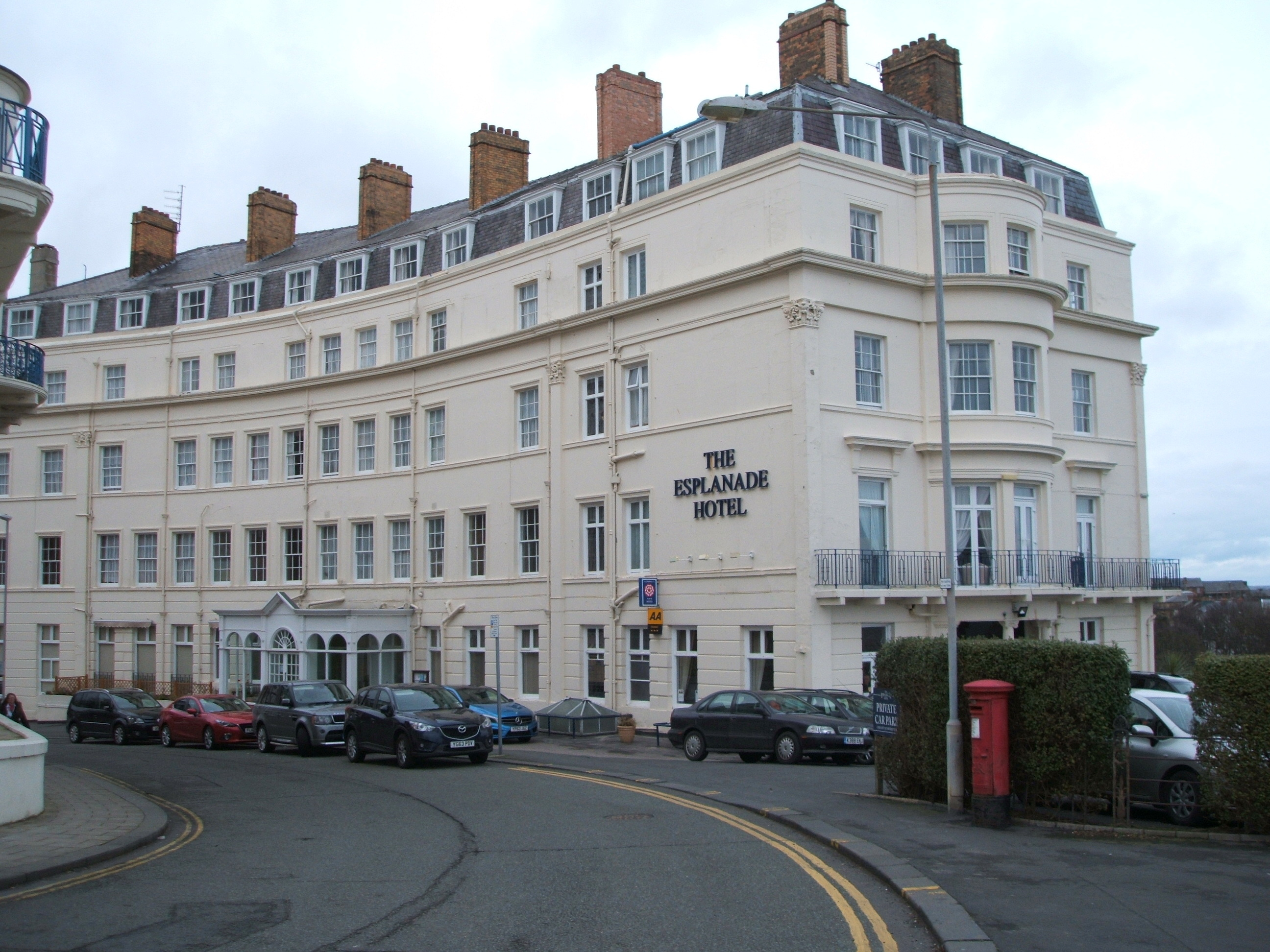
The building, in 2016

The Esplanade Hotel is a historic building in Scarborough, North Yorkshire, a town in England.

The building was constructed in the 1830s, probably as a terrace of houses, and only later being converted into a hotel. It occupies a prominent position above a valley. A new entrance was constructed in the late 20th century. In the early 21st century, it was owned by the Co-operative Group, which sold it to Northern Powerhouse Developments in 2017, who sold it on to Daish's Holidays. In 2025, it was refurbished. The building has been grade II listed since 1973.

The hotel is stuccoed with a rusticated ground floor, and has a frieze, modified Corinthian pilasters, a projecting moulded cornice, a moulded coped parapet, and a slate mansard roof. There are four storeys, a slightly curved plan and fronts of 18 bays. Most of the windows are recessed sashes in architraves. On the south front are bow windows in two and four storeys, and above the ground floor is a continuous iron balcony. In the centre of the north front is the modern entrance.

== See also ==
- Listed buildings in Scarborough (Ramshill Ward)
