= Thomas Hinderwell =

British historian

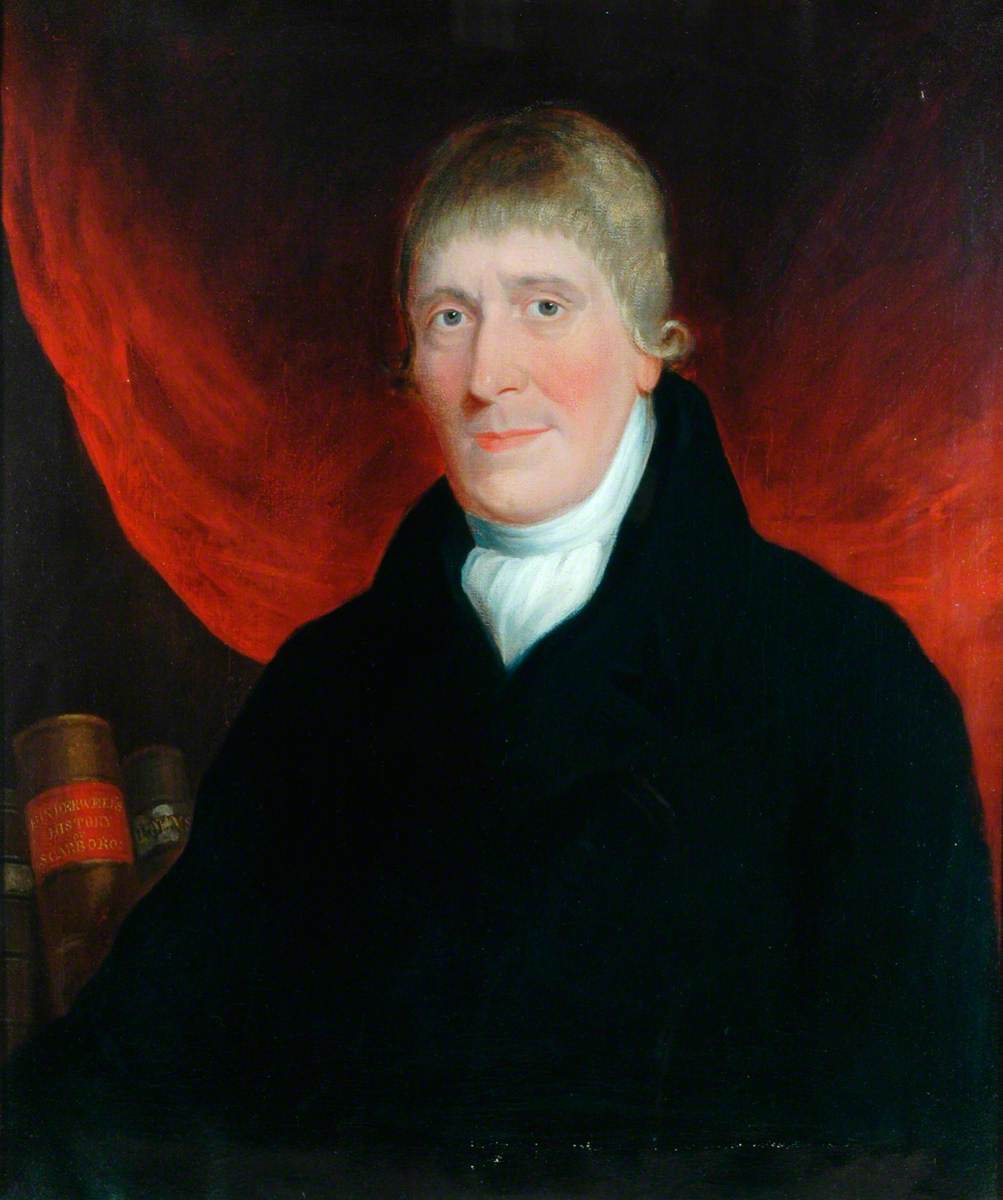
Image of Thomas Hinderwell

Thomas Hinderwell (1744–1825) was a British, eighteenth-century historian. He is probably best remembered for his History of Scarborough, which was first published in York in 1798. Fellow antiquarian John Bigland described it as "one of the most accurate and interesting works relating to this or any other part of England".

After his death, his collection of books, manuscripts, pictures, and fossils formed the basis of Scarborough's Rotunda Museum, one of the oldest purpose-built museums still in use in the United Kingdom.

To celebrate his achievements, a memorial drinking fountain was erected in Scarborough in his memory. A stone plaque bearing the dedication to him was placed opposite, but has since been replaced with a plaque under the blue plaque scheme. There is a second memorial to him in the Rotunda.

He was a friend and associate of William Wilberforce.
