= St James with Holy Trinity Church, Scarborough =

Church in Scarborough, North Yorkshire, England

Coordinates: 54.2739°N 0.4155°W

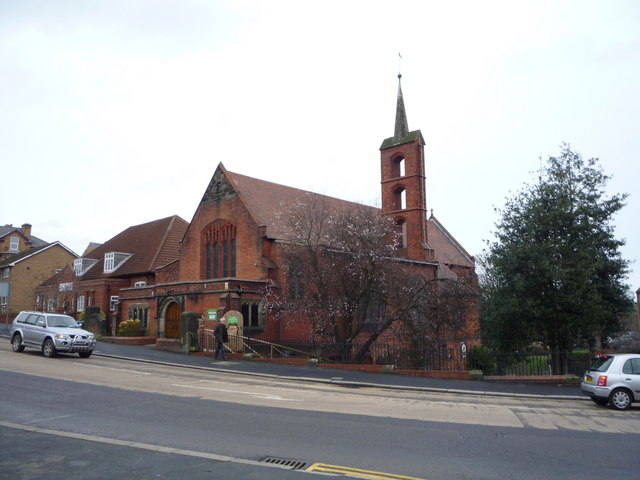
- View from the south-west

- Location in North Yorkshire
- OS grid reference: TA 03260 87610
- Location: Seamer Road, Scarborough, North Yorkshire
- Country: England
- Denomination: Anglican
- Churchmanship: Open Evangelical
- Website: St James, Scarborough

History
- Status: Parish church
- Founded: 1885
- Founder: F. Hartop Holt
- Dedication: Saint James
- Consecrated: 24 July 1894

Architecture
- Functional status: Active
- Heritage designation: Grade II
- Designated: 20 April 2007
- Architect: Paley, Austin and Paley
- Architectural type: Church
- Style: Gothic Revival
- Completed: 1894

Specifications
- Materials: Brick with stone dressings Tiled roofs

Administration
- Province: York
- Diocese: York
- Archdeaconry: East Riding
- Deanery: Scarborough
- Parish: Scarborough St. James with Holy Trinity

Clergy
- Priest: Revd Phil White

St James with Holy Trinity Church is in Seamer Road, Scarborough, North Yorkshire, England. It is an active Anglican parish church in the deanery of Scarborough, the archdeaconry of East Riding, and the diocese of York. The church is recorded in the National Heritage List for England as a designated Grade II listed building.

== History ==
The church originated as a mission chapel to All Saints' Church, Scarborough, and was opened for worship on St James' Day, (25 July) 1885; at this time it seated about 200 people. It was founded by an honorary curate of All Saints' Church, F. Hartop Holt, and much of its cost was provided by his aunt, the widow of the engineer James Nasmyth. The chapel was designed by the Lancaster firm of architects, Paley, Austin and Paley. In 1893 work started on enlarging the church to seat about 350 people by adding two aisles. At the same time the vicar's vestry was added and the porch was enlarged. The extensions were designed by the same architects. The church was consecrated on 24 July 1894 by the Most Revd William Maclagan, Archbishop of York, as a parish church dedicated to Saint James. In 1990 its benefice was united with that of Holy Trinity Church, which had closed in the 1980s, and was rededicated as the Parish Church of St James with Holy Trinity by the Most Revd John Habgood, the Archbishop of York.

=== Present day ===
St James stands in the evangelical Anglican tradition. As of 2024, it is united with the Church of St Columba, Scarborough as the benefice of Scarborough Saint Columba and Saint James with Holy Trinity. The parish is in the Archdeaconry of The East Riding of the Diocese of York.

== Architecture ==
=== Exterior ===
The church stands on a sloping site. It is constructed in brick with stone dressings; its roofs are mainly tiled. The architectural style is Gothic Revival, principally Decorated. Its plan consists of a nave with north and south aisles, and a chancel, with a porch and vestry at the west end. There is a bell tower rising above the east end of the south aisle. Under the east end of the church is an undercroft. The undercroft has three two-light east windows, above which is the four-light east window of the chancel. The top of the chancel is gabled and surmounted by a cross finial. On the south wall of the chancel is a three-light window; the north wall is blank. There is a two-light window in the east wall of the north aisle, and three similar windows along its north wall. At the west end of the nave is a four-light window. The porch and vestry have flat roofs. The south aisle has a two-light west window and two four-light windows on the south side. At its east end is the bell tower that has a slated spire and a weathervane in the form of a fish. To the east of the tower is an organ chamber with a three-light window.

=== Interior ===
The arcades consists of pointed arches carried on piers that have a chamfered diamond cross-section. Between the nave and the chancel is an oak screen incorporating the pulpit. It was installed in 1921 as a memorial to the First World War. It is also inscribed with the names of the civilians who were killed in the naval bombardment of 16 December 1914, the German Navy's only raid on mainland Britain in the war. The reredos, altar and choir stalls are also in oak. At the east end of the north aisle is an artificial stone font that was installed in 1947 as a memorial to the Second World War. The stained glass was designed by Carl Almquist and E. H. Jewitt of Shrigley and Hunt. The east window is a memorial to the founder of the church; it depicts the Last Supper. The single-manual organ was built in 1976 by N. Church.

== See also ==
- Listed buildings in Scarborough (Weaponness and Falsgrave Park Wards)
- List of works by Paley, Austin and Paley
