= St Martin-on-the-Hill, Scarborough =

Church in Scarborough, North Yorkshire, England

Coordinates: 54°16′28.86″N 0°24′0.78″W

The church of St Martin-on-the-Hill, Scarborough
- St Martin-on-the-Hill, Scarborough
- The church of St Martin-on-the-Hill, Scarborough
- OS grid reference: TA 04202 87774
- Location: Scarborough, North Yorkshire
- Country: England
- Denomination: Church of England
- Churchmanship: Anglo-Catholic
- Website: https://www.friendsofstmartins.co.uk/

History
- Dedication: St Martin

Architecture
- Heritage designation: Grade I listed
- Architect: George Frederick Bodley
- Groundbreaking: 1862
- Completed: 11 July 1863

Administration
- Province: York
- Diocese: York
- Archdeaconry: East Riding
- Deanery: Scarborough

Clergy
- Priest: The Rev. J. A. Kenny

St Martin-on-the-Hill is a parish church in Scarborough, North Yorkshire in the Church of England.

== History ==
The church was built between 1862 and 1863 to designs by the architect George Frederick Bodley. It comprises a north tower, saddleback roof, nave with clerestory, aisle and chancel. The west end contains a rose window.

Much of the decoration and stained glass was completed by Morris & Co., some of the earliest work completed by this firm. The ceiling decoration of the chancel is by William Morris and Philip Webb. The altar wall displays the Adoration of the Magi by Edward Burne-Jones. The reredos and rood-screen date from 1889, a later addition by George Frederick Bodley; the artist was Charles Edgar Buckeridge. The paintings on the Bodley organ case were done by John Roddam Spencer Stanhope.

On 16 December 1914, the church was one of many buildings in Scarborough which were damaged during the German bombardment of the town. The raid took place just as the 8.00 a.m. communion service was commencing. Despite the noise and damage, Rev Charles Mackarness continued with the service. Later that day, the wedding of Richard Horsley and Winnifred Duphoit continued as planned.

In June 1973 the church was listed as Grade I.

== Pulpit ==
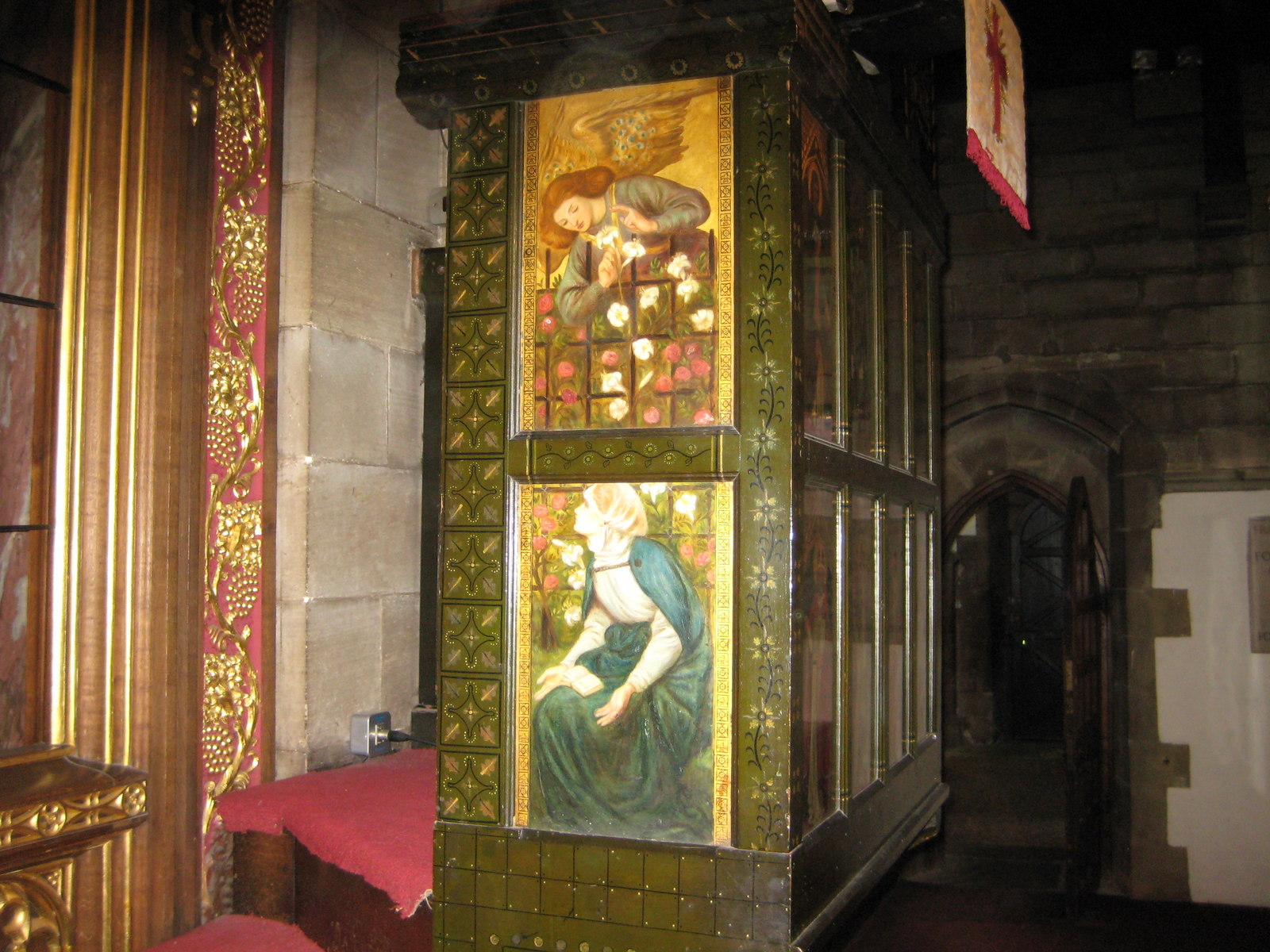
the Rossetti panels in the pulpit

The pulpit has 10 painted panels by Dante Gabriel Rossetti, Ford Madox Brown and William Morris.

== Notable incumbents ==
- Robert Henning Parr: 1863–1888
- Charles Coleridge Mackarness: 1889–1917
- Morris Maddocks: 1961–1971
- Christopher Armstrong: 1991–2001

== Organ ==
An organ was installed in 1875 by the builders Harrison and Harrison. This was later transferred to Holy Trinity Church, Sunningdale, Berkshire.

The organ was installed in 1890 by the notable London firm of Henry Willis. A specification of the organ can be found on the National Pipe Organ Register.

=== Organists ===
- Dr William Creser 1875 – 1880
- Charles Hylton Stewart 1908 – 1914
- Cyril Francis Musgrove 1914 – 1915, 1918 – 1919
- A.Claude Keeton 1919 – 1939

== See also ==
- Grade I listed buildings in North Yorkshire (district)
- Listed buildings in Scarborough (Ramshill Ward)
