= Scarborough funiculars =

Cliff railways

Central Tramway top station

The British town of Scarborough has had a total of five cliff railways, or funiculars, two of which are presently operational. The town is home to the first funicular railway in the United Kingdom.

Having noted the need for better transit between the town and its bays, particularly for tourists, the construction of Scarborough's first funicular commenced in 1873. Designed by William Lucas and built by Crossley Brothers on a route between Scarborough Spa on South Sands and the South Cliff Esplanade, this water-driven lift was opened on 6 July 1875. During subsequent years, multiple other funiculars were constructed; in all, two lifts served Scarborough's North Bay while three covered the South Bay. Various means of propulsion, from steam power to electricity have been used over the years, while other upgrades such as automated operations have been implemented as well.

While some of these funiculars remain operational, others have been permanently withdrawn: both of the North Bay railways have been demolished, while one on South Bay is extant but out of use since 2006. The other two South Cliff lifts are still operational. Reasons for closures have included unsuitable terrain, insufficient revenue, excessive capacity in relation to demand and excessive refurbishment/upgrade costs.

== South Cliff Lift ==
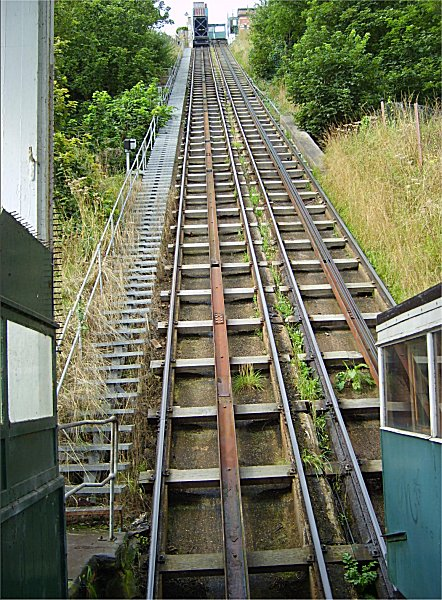
Spa Lift

During 1873, the Scarborough South Cliff Tramway Company Limited was created to construct the first funicular railway in the United Kingdom. It had long been recognised that the height difference between the town and its beaches was a geographical hindrance to the burgeoning tourism industry, and the construction of a funicular was viewed as a means of better facilitating, and extracting revenue from, such movements. It was specifically decided to build this initial cliff railway between the pre-existing Scarborough Spa on South Sands and the South Cliff Esplanade.

The funicular was designed and engineered principally by William Lucas. Its construction was undertaken by Crossley Brothers of Manchester at a cost of £8,000. Metropolitan Carriage of Birmingham constructed the two cars, each capable of carrying 14 seated passengers. Each car was attached to a twin-steel cable rope, which was originally operated by a brakeman at the top station, while the bottom of each car was also fixed to a water tank. The track is 4 ft 8 1/2 in (1,435 mm) standard gauge wide and 284 feet (87 m) long, on 1 in 1.75 (57%) gradient.

Upper station

Using seawater pumped by two Crossley gas engines through a hydraulic system designed by Tangye Ltd of Smethwick, Birmingham, the upper car's water tank was filled until the counterbalance point was reached. The cars then proceeded along their individual tracks, its speed and safety both being regulated by the brakeman. When the upper car reached the bottom of the incline, both cars were braked, and the seawater released into a pipe set between the two tracks so that it could be reused. The procedure was then repeated.

On 6 July 1875, the railway opened. Since opening, it has been refurbished several times; during 1879, the original gas engines were replaced by steam pumps. Between 1935 and 1947, operations were suspended for a time prior to the completion of another refurbishment, which involved the replacement of the water system by 90 hp electric engine. The cars were replaced by two built by Hudswell Clarke & Company in 1934–1935.

During 1993, Scarborough Borough Council purchased the funicular from its owners. In 1997, the control infrastructure of the lift were extensively modified, enabling operations to be handled entirely by its automated systems.

In August 2026 the funicular was closed due to public safety concerns.

== Central Tramway ==
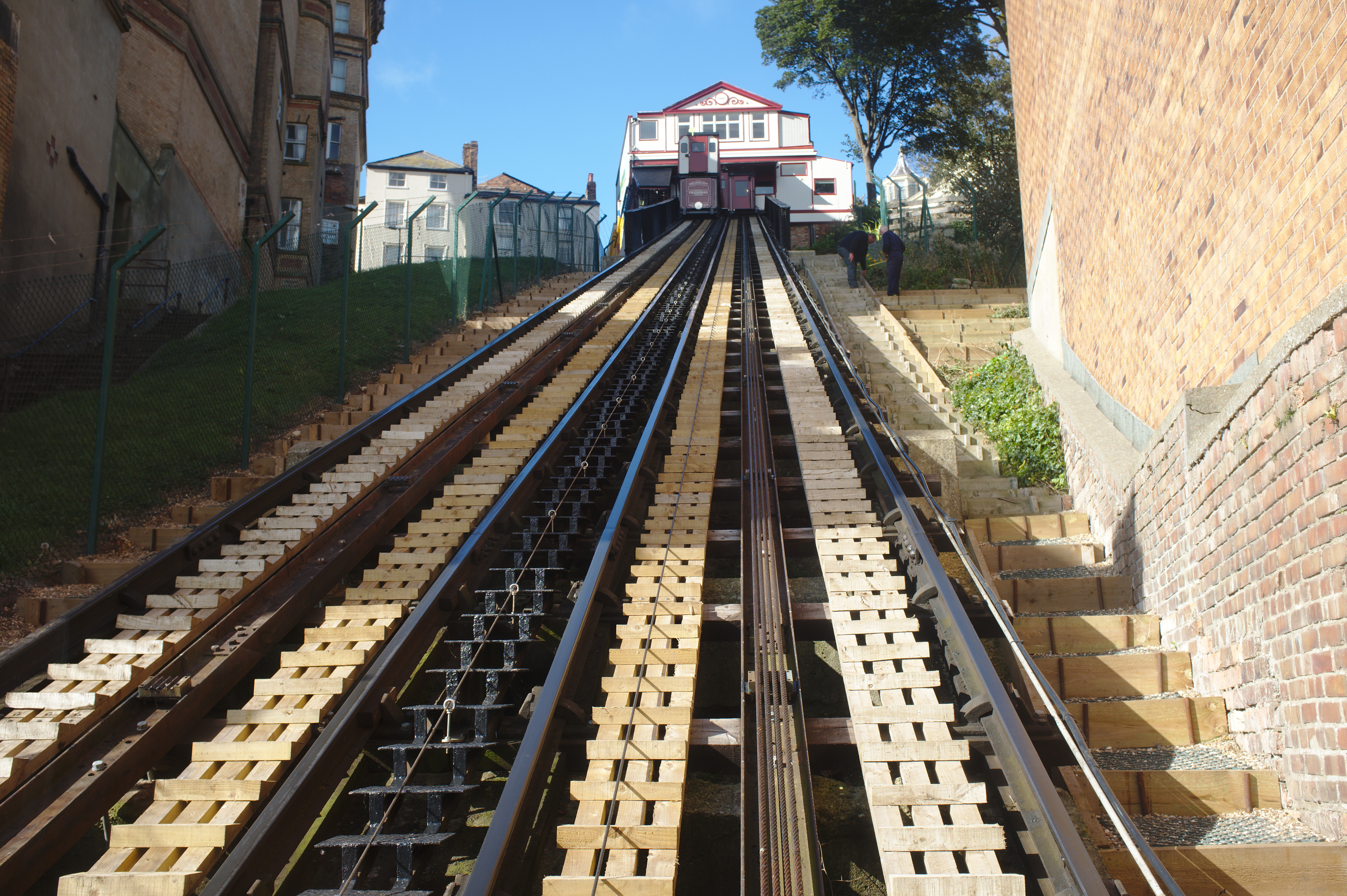
Central Tramway viewed from bottom

Central Tramway, with the harbour in the background

During the late 1870s, the Central Tramway Company, Scarborough Limited was formed with the goal of constructing another funicular, the Central Tramway. This railway was built between Foreshore Road and St Nicholas Gardens using 4 ft 8 1/2 in (1,435 mm) standard gauge track, the selected route covering a distance of 233 ft (71 m) over a 1 in 2 (50%) gradient. In 1880, work on the Central Tramway was completed head of its (54.2809°N 0.3978°W) official commencement of operations on 1 August 1881.

The funicular is operated by two cars. In its original operating configuration, the funicular used steam power generated by equipment sited roughly 59 feet (18 m) beneath the top station; this gave the driver no direct view of the cars. To minimise the risk posed by potential equipment failure, each car is equipped with a safety brake system that works in conjunction with a rail located in the centre of each track.

Upper station

Over its operating life, several changes have been made to this funicular. In 1920, its original steam plant apparatus was retired in favour of an electric drive that was powered via direct current supplied via Scarborough's tramway system. Following the discontinuation of the town's trams, the railway was converted to use alternating current after 1931. During this work period, the original cars were replaced and new motors installed within the top of the station, which provided drivers with a full view of the cars. The lower station has subsequently been replaced by a more modern building.

Passenger demand at the Central Tramway was particularly high, especially amongst guests at Scarborough's neighbouring Grand Hotel. The construction of the nearby St Nicholas Cliff Lift was heavily influenced by the level of demand for the Central Tramway. The lift had been continuously operated by the same company throughout its operating life.

== St Nicholas Cliff Lift ==
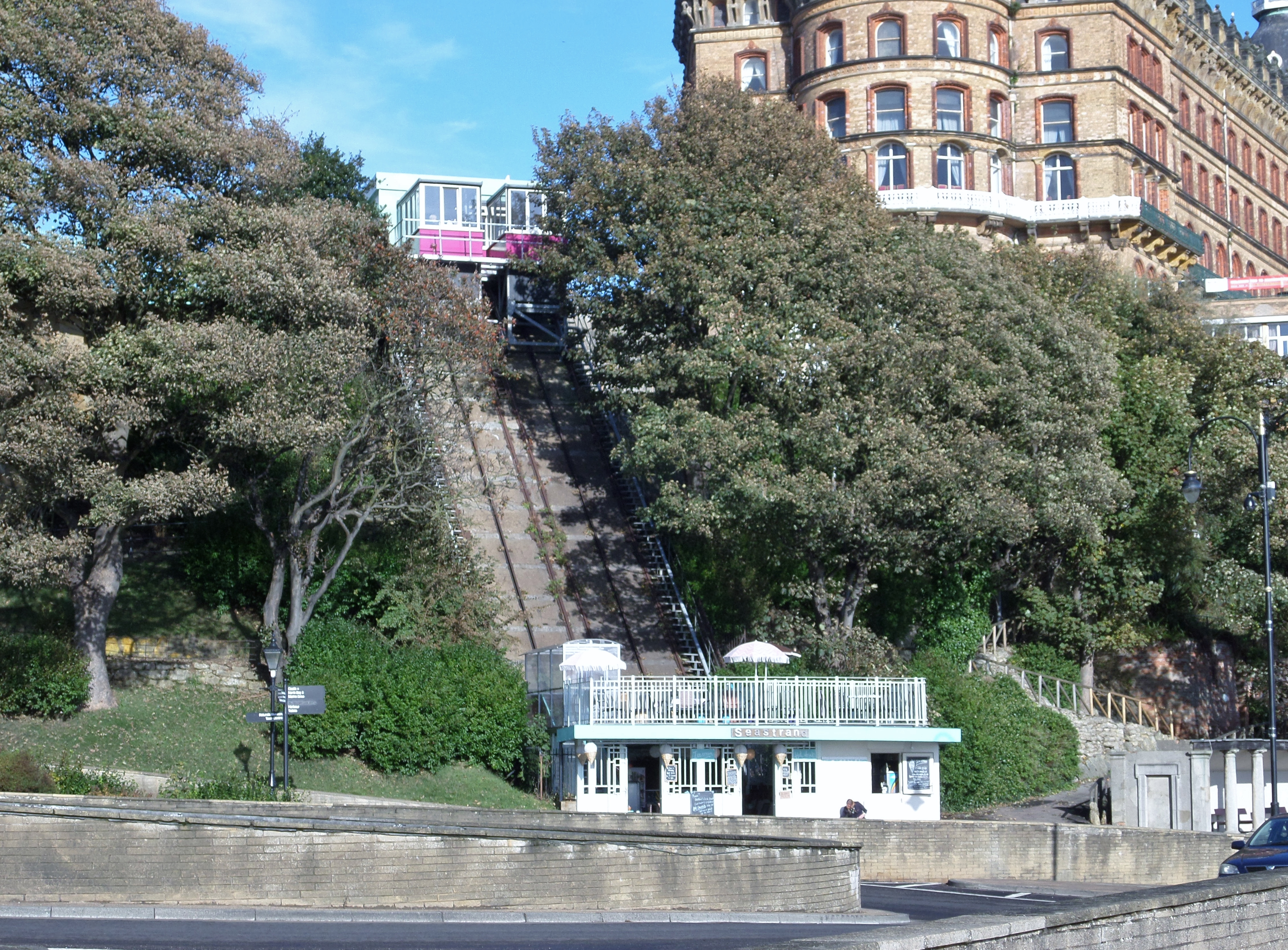
St Nicholas Cliff Lift after conversion

The St Nicholas Cliff Lift (54.2797°N 0.3981°W) was built by the Medway Safety Lift Company Ltd in 1929 and opened on 5 August of that year. Completed at a cost of £6,000, the Saint Nicholas Cliff Lift is located on the other side of the Grand Hotel from the Central Tramway, near the Aquarium. The track is 102 feet (31 m) long on a 1 in 1.33 (75%) gradient, the track gauge is 7 ft 6 in (2,286 mm).

During its initial years of operation, there was no bottom station; passengers stepped into the tramcars directly from the pavement. The control equipment was incorporated in the upper station, fares were also paid solely at this station. From the onset, the St Nicholas Cliff Lift was powered by electricity.

In 1945, the railway was sold to Scarborough Corporation. During February 2007, the lift was closed as the borough council could not afford the estimated £445,000 of modifications needed to conform with modern health and safety standards. Furthermore, it had been operating at a loss, which was allegedly also a factor in its closure, while planners had also projected demand to be within the existing capacity of the Central Tram alone. In early 2011, it was announced that the still closed lift might be sold by the council, as it did not have the £630,000 that the repairs were then estimated to cost. The cost of demolishing the lift was estimated to be around £150,000.

After its closure, the two cars were moved to the top of the track and fixed in place, becoming part of the conversion of the top station into the St Nicholas Cafe. The cars offer seating and a balcony was constructed around them. The lower station was converted into an ice cream parlor called The Seastrand. The rails the cars ran on are still present.

== North Bay Cliff Lift ==
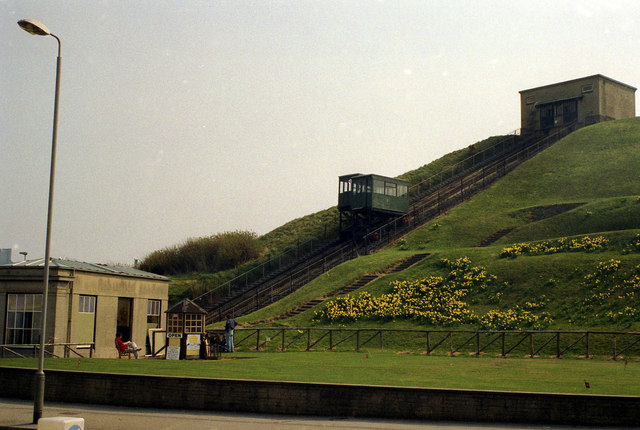
The North Bay Cliff lift in 1995

During early 1930, the North Bay Cliff Lift was constructed by the Medway Safety Lift Company Ltd as one element of the wider development of Peasholm Gap. Opening for the first time in August of that year, this lift was the only funicular serving the north bay throughout its operating life.

The funicular was operated by a pair of cars running on parallel tracks, which had a length of 167 feet (51 m) and a width of 6 ft 6 in (1,981 mm). The propulsion system used an electric drive system.

During September 1996, it was decided to close the lift permanently rather than undertake a series of repairs to correct mechanical issues and address corrosion, which had an estimated cost of £75,000 to complete. Over the following two years, it was entirely dismantled, with the remaining elements being donated to the Launceston Civic Society in 1998. Much of these assets are presently in storage at the Launceston Steam Railway in Launceston, Cornwall.

== Queens Parade Cliff Lift ==
Observing the South Bay's first cliff railway, opened in 1875, to have been a success, proposals were rapidly actioned for a similar funicular to serve the neighboring North Bay. Thus, on 4 March 1878, the Scarborough Queen's Parade Tramway Company Limited was created to build and operate such a lift. The selected route of the lift was 285 feet (87 m) in length across a 1 in 2.5 (40%) slope between Queen's Parade and the Promenade Pier. Built at a relatively fast pace, it was opened for the first time on 8 August 1878.

This first North Bay railway had two cars running on parallel 4 ft (1,219 mm) tracks. In many respects, its configuration was that of a typical funicular. Its propulsion system involved a pair of counterbalanced water tanks, one underneath each car; these were alternatively filled and emptied while the cars were in either station to change the weight of the cars and thus move the cars via gravity alone.

However, the Queens Parade Cliff Lift experienced a series of particularly unfortunate events. The opening day was marred by one of the carriages having broken free and crashed into the lower station, with the resulting damage forcing the immediate closure of the funicular. It was not able to reopen until repairs were complete during the following year. This apparent bad luck continued through a series of accidents, including multiple landslips and equipment failures. The quick succession of misfortune caused the railway's management to conclude that the venture was untenable, resulting in operations being permanently ceased during 1887, barely nine years after opening. The neighbouring pier was also ill-fated, being destroyed by a gale in 1905.

== Ticketing ==
Tickets

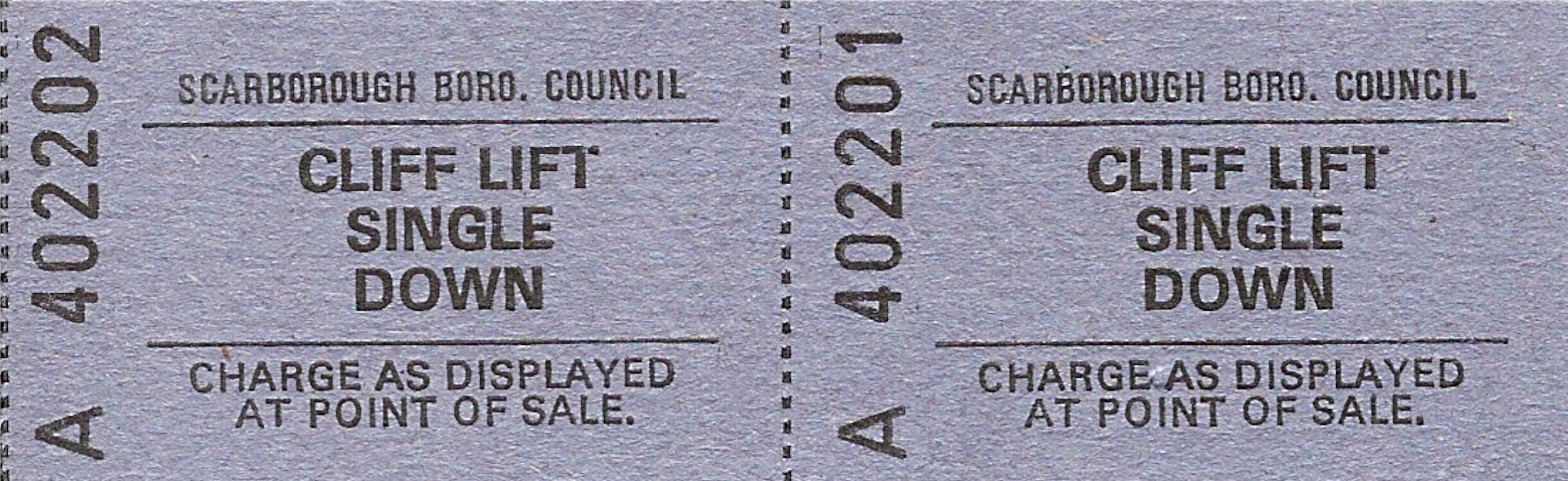
St Nicholas Cliff Lift ticket

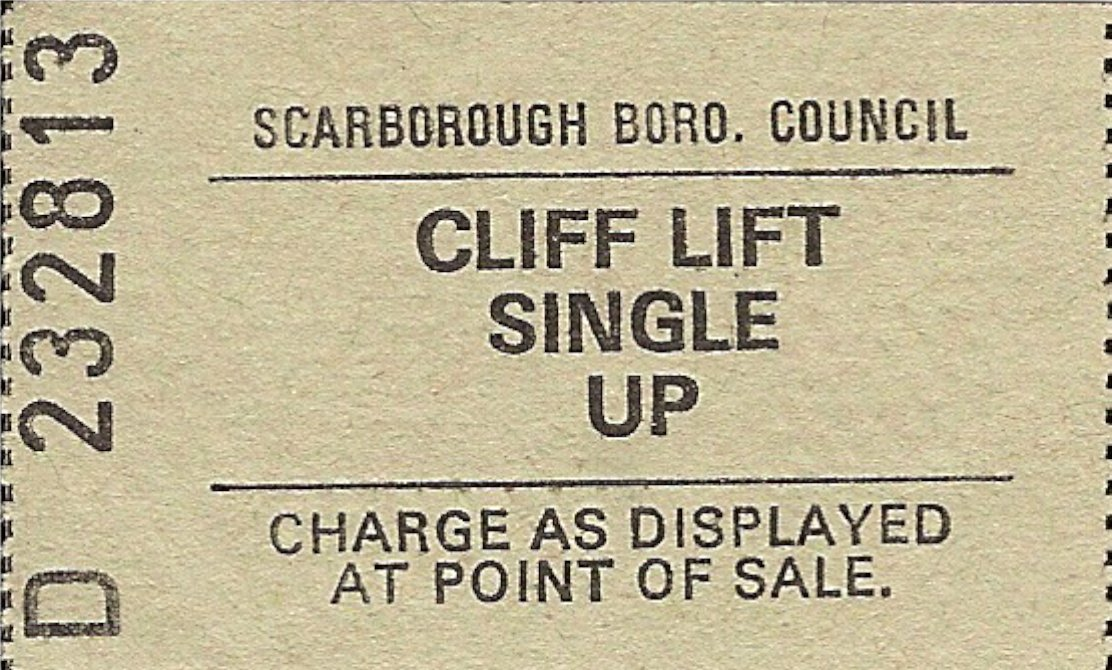
South Cliff Lift ticket

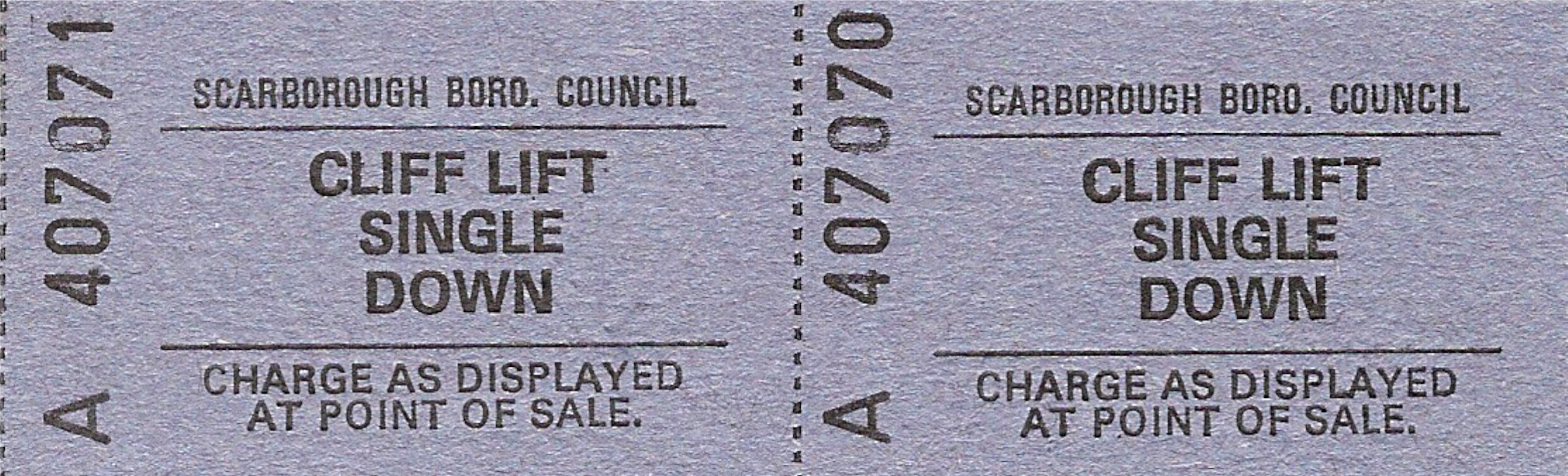
South Cliff Lift ticket

== See also ==
- Listed buildings in Scarborough (Ramshill Ward)
