= Roxana Halls =

English painter

- Born: 1974 (age 51–52); Plaistow, London
- Movement: Feminist art movement
- Awards: Elizabeth Greenshields Foundation Award
- Website: roxanahalls.com

Roxana Halls (born 1974, UK) is a British painter. She has been praised for her art. She lives with her wife in London.

== Early life ==
Halls was born in Plaistow, London.

Growing up, she aspired to be an actress and her long-standing interest in drama and performance is evident in the baroque sensibility of many of her works. Halls has said that she often equates painting with performance and that her models collude with her in creating theatrical scenarios for which the viewer is invited to tease out narratives.

Describing herself as mainly self-taught, Hall took a foundation course in art at Plymouth College of Art and Design but found that she was very self-reliant. When she moved to London, she ‘just painted, worked hard, went to the National Gallery constantly and did it that way.’ She moved near a former theatre in south London where she established her first studio.

== Career ==
Halls’s practice has relied on painting from life, memory, and photographs. Referencing everything from high art and philosophy to the zeitgeist (including, at different times, Charcot’s ‘The Iconographie Photographique de la Salpêtrière,’ Hélène Cixous’s écriture feminine, the war time paintings of Dame Laura Knight, Bosch’s The Garden of Earthly Delights, the songs of Nick Cave, Peaches and Robert Wyatt, Sylvia Plath, avantgarde cinema, and the fashion for glamorising the past), Halls’s paintings examine gender, class, identity and sexuality. Halls has claimed she is magpie-like, attracted by beautiful things but also by the discarded and careworn.

Whilst her Shadow Play and Suspended Women series (2012) may recall the surrealism of artists like Dorothea Tanning or Meret Oppenheim, Halls does not consider her work surreal. However, performance, theatricality, illusion, and magic are recurring themes. Her exhibition Roxana Halls’ Tingle-Tangle, produced for the National Theatre, London in 2009 borrowed the language of cabaret performance, Halls re-imaging herself as the impresario of a troupe. For her painting Terina The Paper Tearer and Inferna The Human Torch, she performed Inferna, a character she created after being inspired by a costume she found in a charity shop in Brixton. Whilst she used external performers for other works in the series, self-portraits have always been an important aspect of her oeuvre though Halls has stated that she rarely paints herself as herself. Halls allows paintings to evolve in the making rather than beginning with preparatory drawings. This mirrors her interest in depicting women in evolving states, in liminal states, held sometimes in suspension.

Halls has also explored consumption and abstinence, as in her 'Appetite' series (2013–14), where women transgress by not behaving as they are expected to: Halls shows one gorging on popcorn, eating with her mouth open (referencing, perhaps, the eighteenth century celebrity portraitist Elisabeth Vigée-LeBrun and her innovation of showing her teeth in her self-portraits – something that was considered uncouth or deemed the sign of a maniac; Halls paints the teeth last in her paintings). Inspired by Artemisia Gentileschi and Caravaggio’s versions of Judith and Holofernes, another woman (Halls again) takes over the traditionally male role in Carvery, 2013 where platters of working-class food teeter on the edge of this feast for one, much like the plate in Caravaggio’s Supper at Emmaus. She wields her implements, carving out her own place in the world.

In 2018, Halls, along with other lesbian portrait painters Sadie Lee and Sarah Jane Moon, was part of the Threesome exhibition at the New Arts Project in London. The show explored the concept of the female gaze and each artist produced four paintings for the show.

In 2020 Halls was invited to paint Portrait of Katie Tomkins, Mortuary & Post Mortem Services Manager by her colleague Natalie Miles-Kemp on behalf of West Hertfordshire Hospitals NHS Trust for what became a major lockdown art project in the UK during the global Covid pandemic: Portraits for NHS Heroes, conceived by Tom Croft.

Halls was also commissioned to make portraits for Katherine Parkinson’s play, Sitting.

Halls’s work is in private and public collections, both in the U.K. and overseas. Besides solo exhibitions at Beaux Arts, Bath; Hay Hill, London; and at Reuben Colley Fine Art, Birmingham, her work has been shown in numerous group shows in the UK and US, including the BP Portrait Award at The National Portrait Gallery, London, The R.A. Summer Exhibition, The Royal Society of Portrait Painters, The Discerning Eye, The Ruth Borchard Self Portrait Competition. In 2004, Halls won the Villiers David Prize which enabled her to visit Berlin for the first time and make her 'Cabaret' series. In 2010, she won the Founder’s Purchase Prize at the ING Discerning Eye show and thus entered their collection. Her 2019 portrait of Scottish musician Horse McDonald was acquired for the permanent collection of the Scottish National Portrait Gallery.

In 2020, Halls became a founder-member and later Director of InFems Art Collective. and created her first NFT "Pulse Points" in 2022 as part of 'Nightclubbing' - InFems's collaboration with Carolina Herrera.

In 2022, Halls was the featured artist in the first episode of BBC's Extraordinary Portraits, hosted by Tinie Tempah, where she was commissioned to paint twin sisters Georgia and Melissa Laurie, who survived a crocodile attack in Mexico. Also in 2022, Halls' portrait of Katie Tomkins, Mortuary & Post Mortem Services Manager at West Hertfordshire NHS Trust was acquired for the permanent collection of the Science Museum, London, UK as part of their COVID-19 Collecting Project.

Halls was commissioned to create the Stretching Room paintings for Disney's 2023 film Haunted Mansion. The works are now in the Disney Archive.

== Selected works ==
- Beauty Queen 2014
- Threesome II (Self-Portrait) 2018
- Terina the Paper Tearer & Inferna the Human Torch 2009
- Laughing While Eating Salad 2013
- Girt & Ina van Elben's Tingel Tangel Machine 2007
- Girl Table 2014
- Laughing While Leaving
- A Little Light Reading 2012
- Carvery 2013
- Emma 2010
