= Points of Light (United Kingdom) =

UK civic award

- Awarded for: Voluntary work
- Country: United Kingdom
- Presented by: Prime Minister of the United Kingdom, Government of the United Kingdom
- Eligibility: Individual volunteers
- First award: April 2014
- Final award: 23 May 2024

Highlights
- Total: 2,327
- Website: www.pointsoflight.gov.uk

In the United Kingdom, a daily Points of Light programme recognising outstanding individual volunteers was developed in partnership with the US programme of the same name and launched by then Prime Minister David Cameron at 10 Downing Street in April 2014.

The awards continued under Prime Ministers Theresa May, Boris Johnson and Rishi Sunak with 2,327 individuals across the UK recognised. As of 2026, the awards' website shows that the most recent award was given on 23 May 2024 — the day after Sunak announced the 2024 United Kingdom general election, which he lost to the Labour Party.

== Recipients ==
Points of Light honourees include:

- Joe Seddon who founded Access Oxbridge, a mentorship scheme that helps disadvantaged students to apply to the University of Oxford and the University of Cambridge.
- Captain Sir Tom Moore for his work raising over £32 million for the NHS Charities Together during the COVID-19 pandemic.
- Tony Hudgell, a five-year-old boy, inspired by Captain Tom Moore, raised over £1.5m for the Evelina London Children's Hospital by walking 10 km on his prosthetic legs.
- Monty Lord for founding the charity Young Active Minds at the age of 14 years old, to advance mental health awareness and creating an app to provide mental health advice to young people.
- Jagraj Singh for his services in recognition of his voluntary work with Everything's 13 and Basics of Sikhi which he founded.
- Rob Burrow for campaigning for better research into motor neurone disease.
- Mavis Paterson for raising funds for charity through long-distance cycling.
- Rizwan Javed, a railway worker commended for saving the lives of 29 people who were planning suicide.
- Painter Thomas Croft, for his Portraits for NHS Heroes initiative.
- Rajindar Singh Dhatt, for his community service and veteran advocacy.
- Holly Cooke and the Lonely Girls Club for addressing the issues around loneliness and its impact on mental health.
- Caroline Jones for raising funds for Cancer Research UK by wearing different charity clothes every day of 2015 after her mother died of breast cancer in October 2014.

== Commonwealth Points of Light ==
A Commonwealth Points of Light award series was launched in February 2018 as a continuation of the UK Prime Minister's Points of Light programme to coincide with the UK hosting the Commonwealth Heads of Government Meeting in London, April 2018. These awards were made by Queen Elizabeth II, as Head of the Commonwealth, to thank inspirational volunteers across the 53 Commonwealth nations for the difference they are making in their communities and beyond.

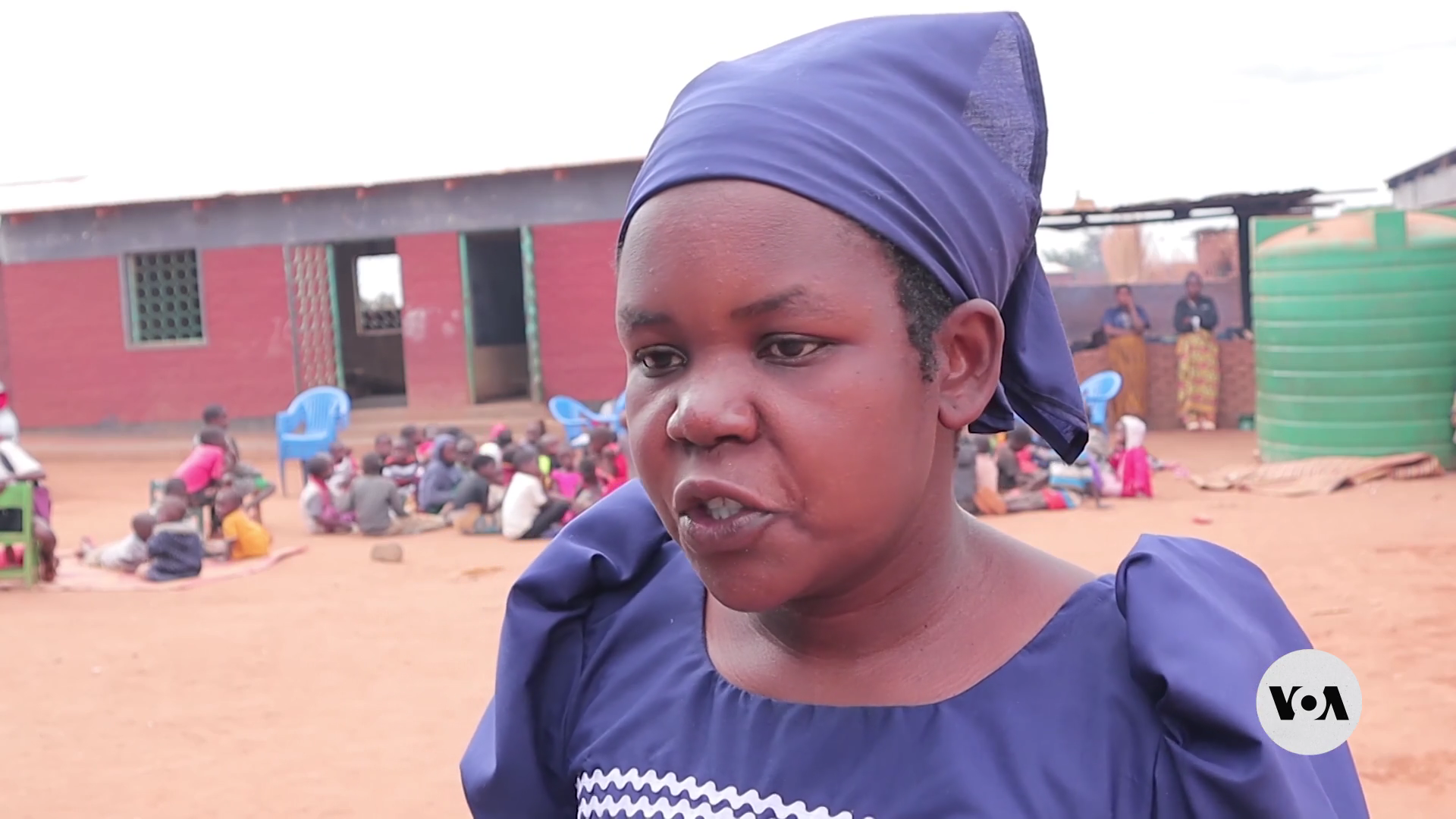
Temwani Chilenga

One recipient was Temwani Chilenga who is a teacher in Lilongwe. She cared for her students and having realised that some were orphans she started the Zoe Foundation which looks after about 100 orphans. Charles Nyasa, a Malawian physiotherapist, received this award at the age of 23 for exceptional service encouraging people with disabilities to play sport.
