= Charlotte Thompson =

Charlotte Thompson may refer to:

- Charlotte Pullein-Thompson (born 1957), author
- Charlotte Thompson-Edgar, British nurse
- Charlotte Thompson Reid (1913–2007), U.S. Congresswoman
- Charlotte Thompson (actress) (1843-1898), English actress
- Charlotte Thompson (playwright) (1884–1919), American playwright; adapter of Rebecca of Sunnybrook Farm

== See also ==
- Charlotte Small (1785–1857), wife of explorer David Thompson
