= George Groves =

George Groves may refer to:

- George Groves (footballer) (1868–1941), English footballer, cricket player, and sports journalist
- George Groves (sound engineer) (1901–1976), American film sound pioneer
- George Groves (boxer) (born 1988), English boxer
- George Groves (American football) (1921–2011), American football guard
- George Groves (artist) (born 1999), English portrait artist
