= Aspire Lake =

Man-made lake in Qatar

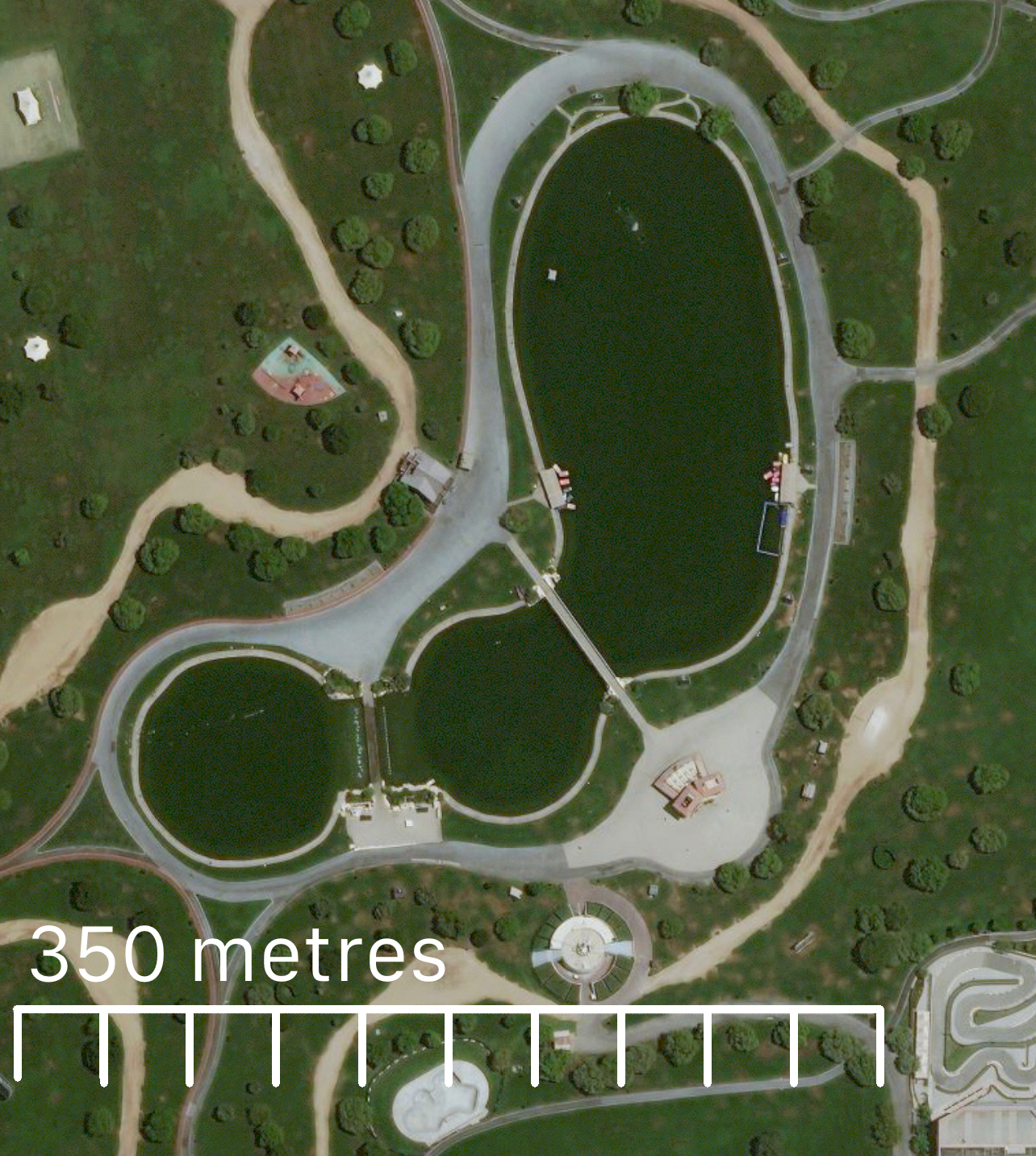
- Aspire lake with a scale

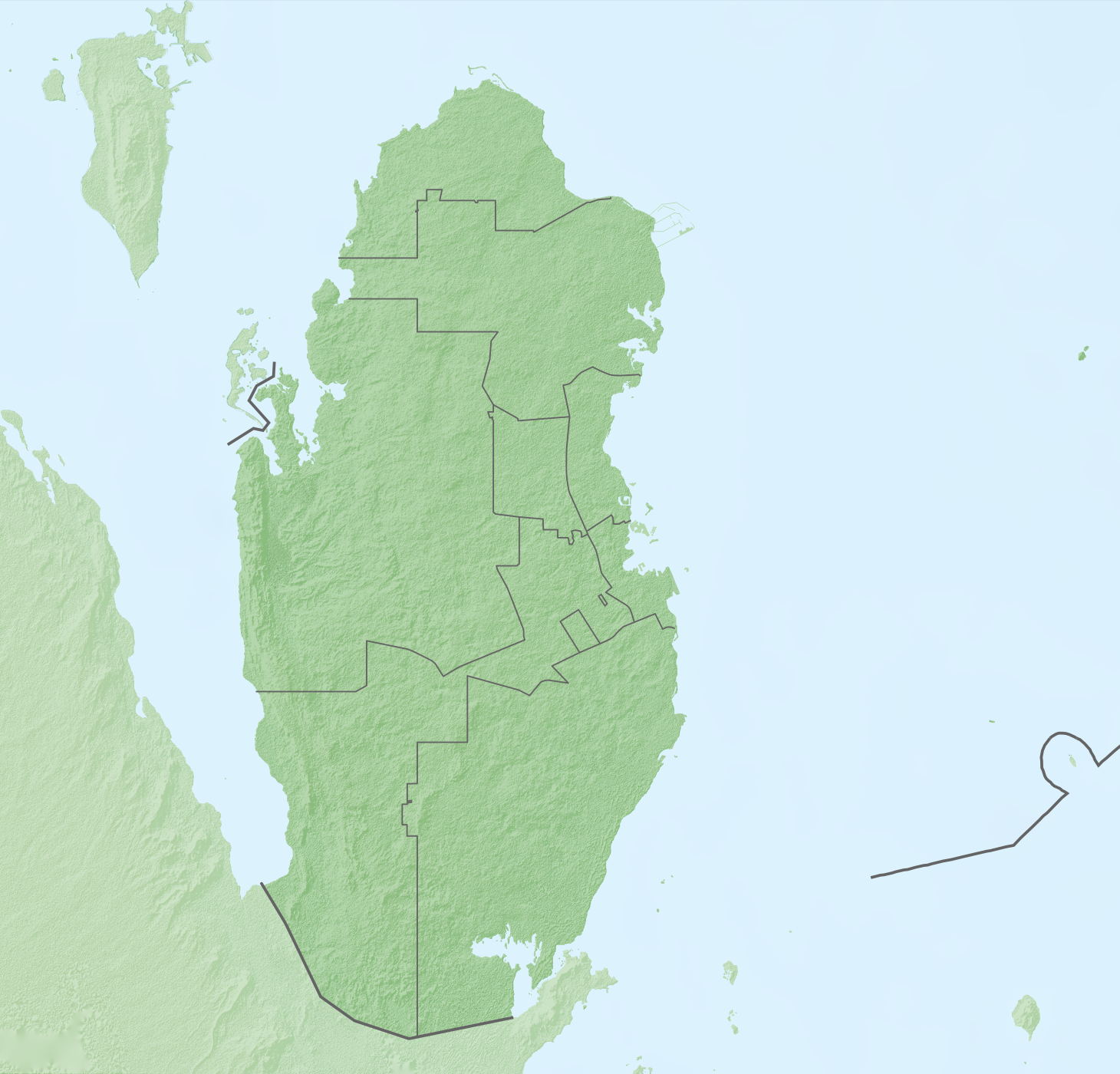
- Location within Qatar
- Coordinates: 25°15′01″N 51°27′00″E
- Type: Artificial
- Max. length: 3 kilometres (1.9 mi)
- Surface area: 3.37 hectares (8.3 acres)
- Islands: Cormorant island

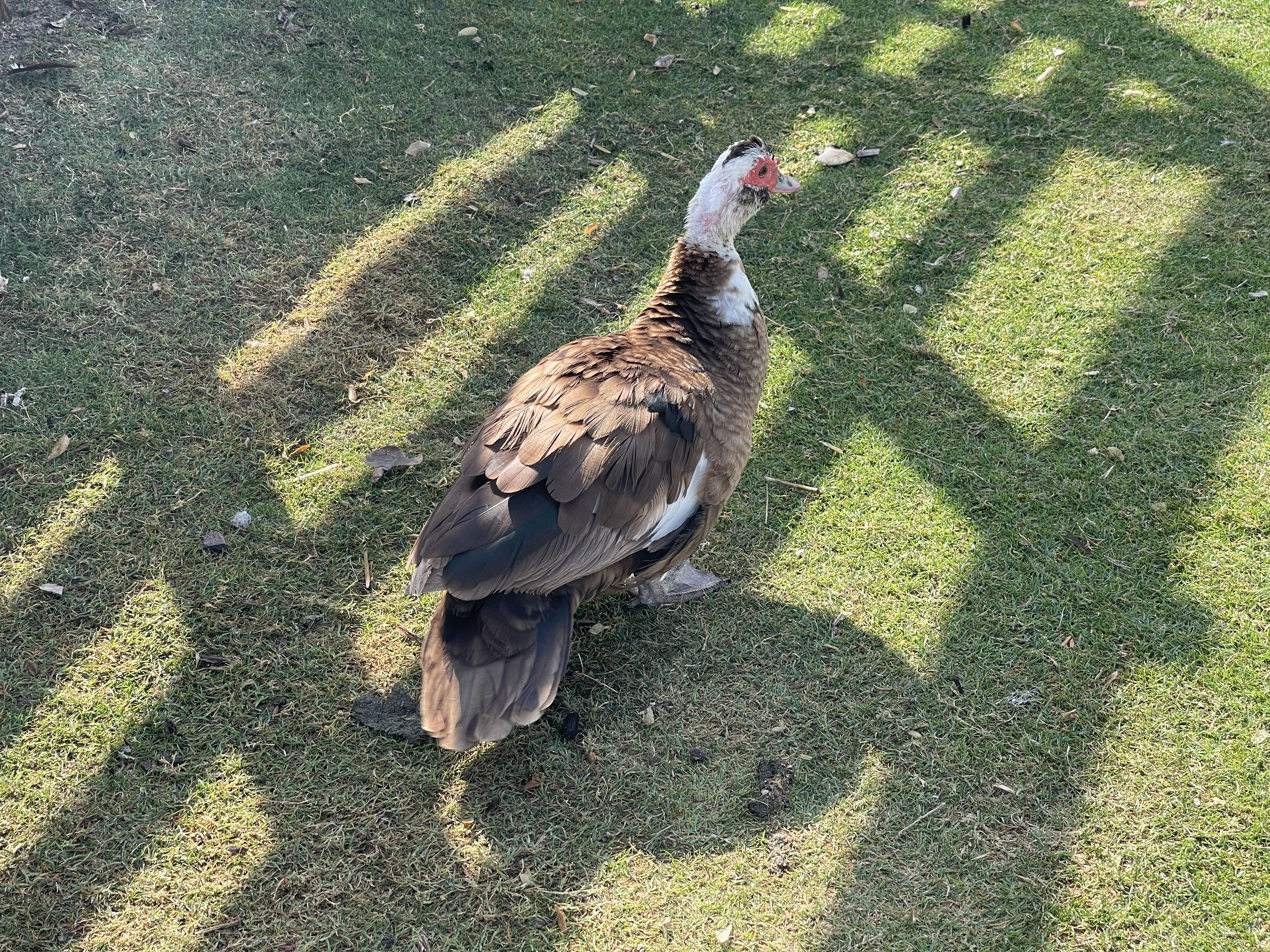
A Domestic Muscovy duck

Aspire Lake is the only lake in Qatar, located in Aspire Park, Doha. The lake serves as a sanctuary for several species of waterfowl and sea-faring birds, both domesticated or wild.

== Geography ==
The 3.37-hectare (8.3-acre) lake is situated upon a flat grassland in the park, west of a large hill.

== Features ==
The lake is divided into three rounded sections. In the south, there are two circular divisions, and the north, an elliptical body composes 75% of the lake. The sections are divided by two bridges, the southernmost being composed mainly of wood, and the northern bridge being larger, higher and composed of stone. At certain intervals, a large fountain may start to spray water arching above the wooden bridge at many points. The perimeter of the lake is barricaded with ropes, and there are two points in which the lake can be accessed via boats.

On the west side of the lake, there is a cafe styled as a cottage, as well as Perceval, a statue of a Clydesdale horse with its right flank opposite of the lake. It is depicted with a carriage holding two giant squashes.

== Fauna ==
The combined domestic and wild animals that can be found at the lake have caused it to become a common tourist attraction for visitors in Aspire Park. The lake serves as a “hub” for a large collection of species, primarily birds.

=== Domesticated ===
Upon the completion of the park in 2003, it was decided that several Domesticated animals should be introduced to create an artificial ecosystem within the lake. As Qatar does not have any natural freshwater, the risk of waterfowl becoming invasive was practically non-existent. Several varieties of duck, the goose, and the Muscovy were then released into the vicinity of the lake, and they have since been established. However, it wasn't just what lived above the water that saw focus, as soon, the aquatic fauna was to arrive. The only fish species that inhabits the lake currently is the koi carp (Cyprinus rubrofuscus var. koi), however it has been proposed to introduce more fish species, which would diversify the environment and encourage migrating piscivorous birds to frequent the lake such as Grebes and Kingfishers. The ducks and geese are tame and can often be found all across the pathways in massive congregations, often approaching visitors to be fed.

=== Wild ===
The lake however, was not to be as entirely artificial as expected. Soon, many species of bird were drawn to the new freshwater habitat that had been constructed, and the combination of trees to find refuge in as well as the promise of food scattered by visitors trying to feed the ducks began to attract the smaller, shy songbirds as well as droves of pigeons and doves. Unlike their conspecifics in urban environments, they are often less skittish and allow photographers to approach them at closer distances than usual.

The shores of the lake are frequented by migratory waterbirds as well. The most common wild duck species that can be observed around the lake is the Mallard.

A single island exists, around 5 metres (16 ft) off the northwest shore. It covered with a straw roof. A small flock of Great cormorants eventually found this island, and settled. Nowadays, they are residents and are found year-round.

== Gallery ==
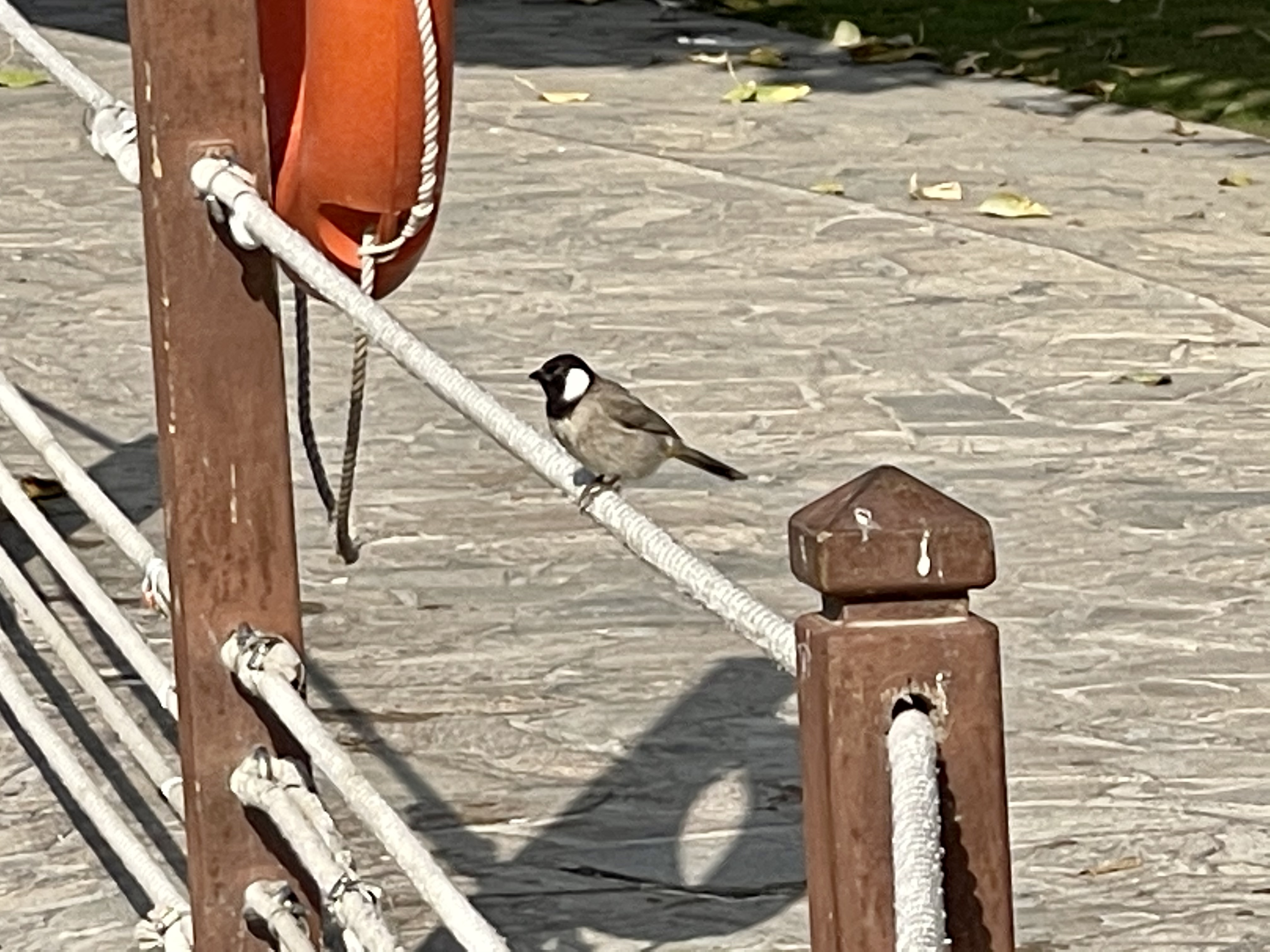
A White-eared bulbul descending to consume food spread by visitors

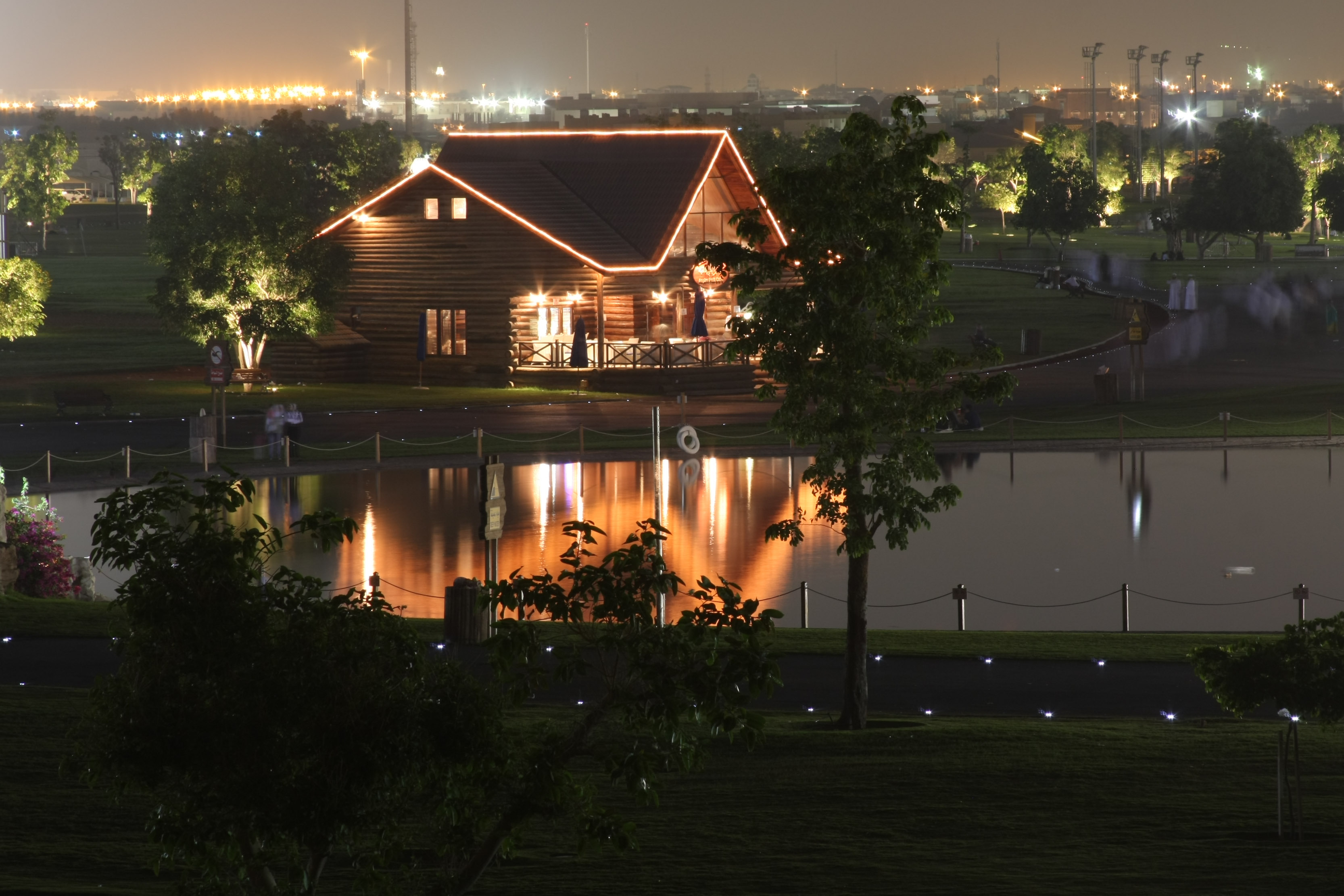
The Cottage overlooking Aspire Lake at nighttime

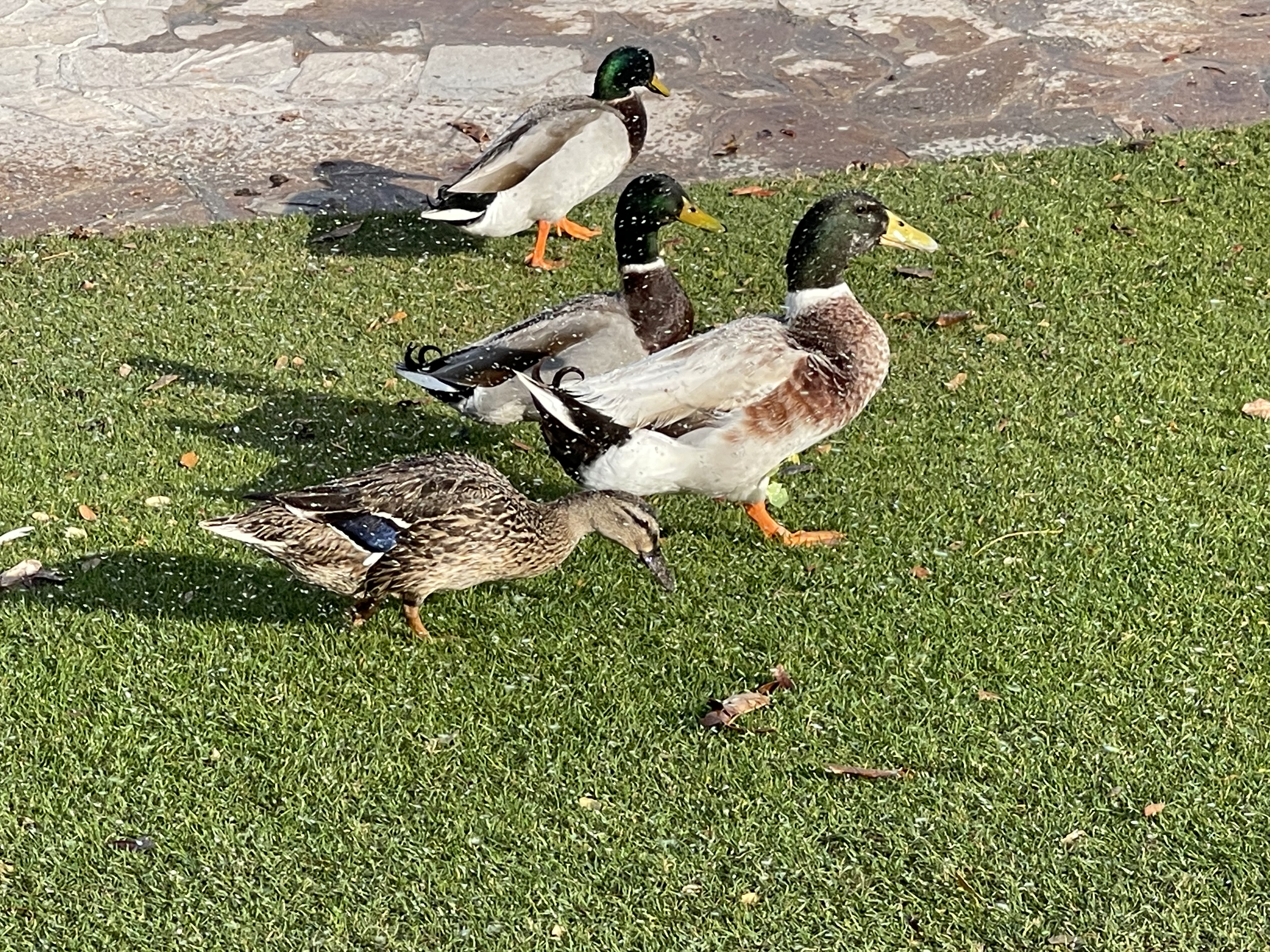
Mallards under a fountain

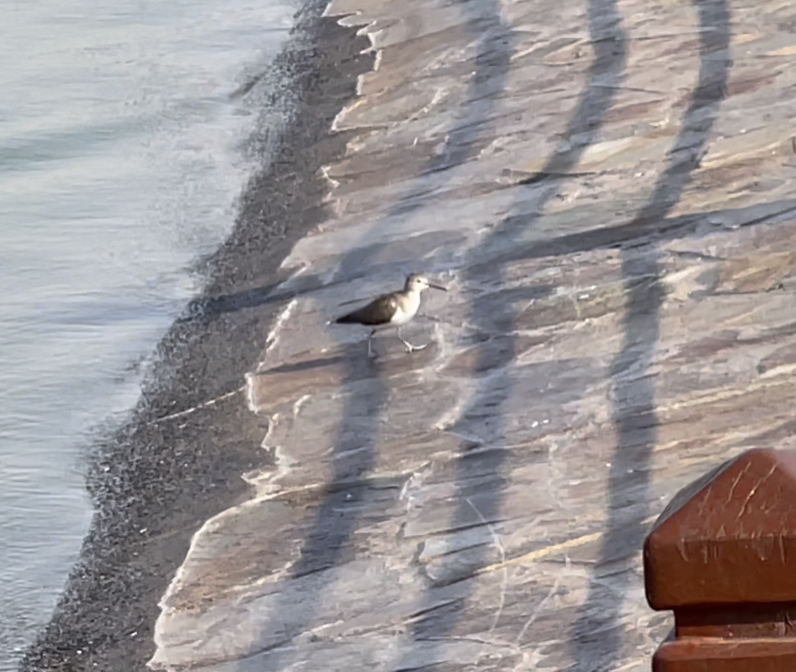
a Curlew sandpiper foraging near the barricade at the lake

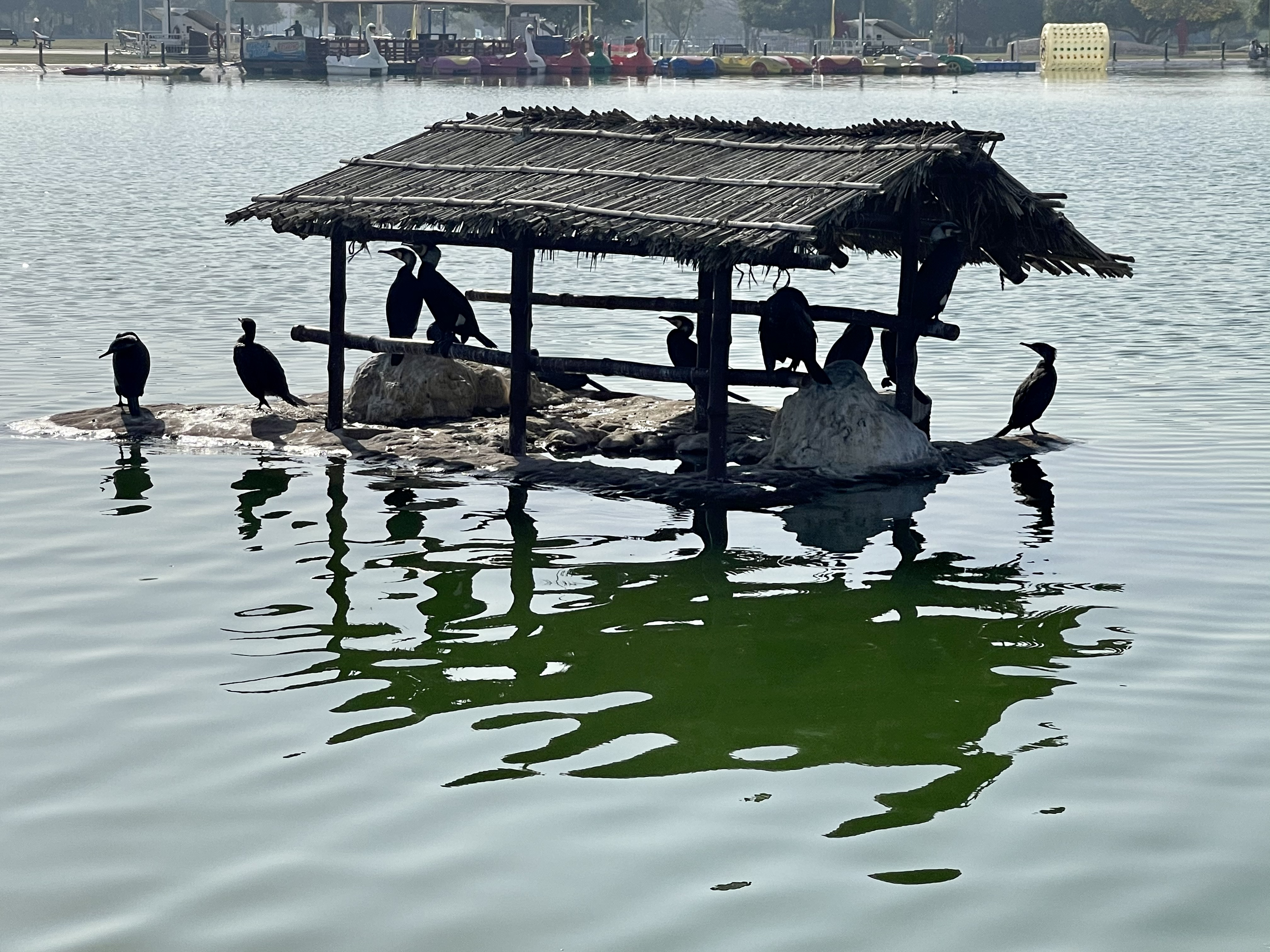
Great cormorants at the island on the lake
