= Thomas Croft (artist) =

- Occupation: Artist, portraitist, television presenter
- Awards: British Empire Medal (2021 New Year Honours); Points of Light (1455)
- Website: www.thomascroft.co.uk

Thomas William Robert Croft is a British painter, from Oxford, known for his work in portraiture.

At a loss as to what to paint during COVID-19 lockdown, he put out an offer on Instagram on 4 April 2020, saying he would paint a free portrait for the first National Health Service (NHS) worker to reply:

I'm offering a free oil portrait to the first NHS frontline worker to DM me, I will work in lockdown from a photo you can provide me with. You get to keep the oil portrait and when the restrictions are lifted we can have an exhibition of all the portraits. Tag any artist who you think might want to participate and any NHS key workers you think deserve a portrait. #portraitsfornhsheroes 🎨💚 -

This led to him painting a portrait in oils of Manchester Royal Infirmary Accident & Emergency nurse Harriet Durkin, wearing PPE, including a 3M face mask, a Guardian visor, gloves and a gown. He gave the painting to her.

However, Croft received so many requests that he eventually put 500 NHS workers in touch with professional artists, who volunteered to paint them. This became known as the Portraits for NHS Heroes initiative. Croft published a book of the portraits in January 2021, with royalties donated to NHS Charities Together.

He was the featured artist in the 2022 penultimate episode of the first series of the BBC TV programme Extraordinary Portraits, where he painted a portrait of former Royal Marine Mark Ormrod; the picture's abstract background being painted by Ormrod's children Mason and Evie.

He competed in Sky Arts' Portrait Artist of the Year in 2018, with Kirsty Wark as his sitter. He has presented two episodes of Sky Arts' Artist of the Year Masterclass, including an episode on self-portraiture.

Croft was given a "Point of Light" award by Prime Minister Boris Johnson in August 2020, for his Portraits for NHS Heroes work, and the British Empire Medal in the 2021 New Year Honours, "For services to the Arts and to Charity during the Covid-19 Response".

His other sitters include Will Gompertz, in 2013. He is a member of the Oxford Art Society.

== Publications ==
- Tom Croft (12 November 2020), Portraits for NHS Heroes, Bloomsbury Publishing, OL 25259363W, Wikidata Q101499921
