= Pangolin Editions =

- Company type: Foundry
- Industry: Metal casting
- Founded: 1985
- Founders: Rungwe Kingdon, Claude Koenig
- Headquarters: Stroud, Gloucestershire, England
- Products: Sculptures
- Website: pangolin-editions.com

Pangolin Editions is a metal foundry in Stroud, Gloucestershire, England, specialising in casting bronze sculptures, as well as other metals, such as silver and stainless steel. Their castings include several notable public artworks in the UK, as well as in Qatar and the United States, and their clients include prominent sculptors.

== History ==
The foundry was established in 1985, by the married couple Rungwe Kingdon and Claude Koenig, who met at art school.

In 2015 a new furnace was installed, to facilitate the casting of stainless steel.

London newspaper The Standard described Pangolin Editions in 2012 as "Europe's largest sculpture foundry".

Early in his career, the sculptor Nick Elphick worked at the foundry.

== Clients ==
Damien Hirst, whose studio is adjacent to the foundry, has had all his cast works made there. In 2012 he unveiled his sculpture Grotesque Unicorn - The Dream is Dead, cast in sterling silver in an edition of four, at the Pangolin Gallery in London. Other long-term collaborators include Lynn Chadwick, Maggi Hambling, Martin Jennings and Sarah Lucas. The foundry has cast pieces for artists including Bruce Beasley, Halima Cassell, Antony Gormley, Philip Jackson, and Grayson Perry.

Pangolin worked with Eric Fischl to digitise his paintings and cast them in bronze, which he then painted; these were then exhibited at Victoria Miro, Venice. They worked with Jonathan Yeo to create a 3D printed sculpture.

The foundry also undertakes work for sculptors who prefer not to have the fact that they do not cast their own pieces known.

== Ruwenzori Foundation ==
Pangolin's directors created the Ruwenzori Foundation (originally the Ruwenzori Sculpture Foundation), a registered charity, in 2004 to allow educational and cultural exchanges between artists in Africa and the United Kingdom. It has built an arts centre with a foundry in Uganda.

== Selected works ==
Works cast at the foundry include:

Image	Title / subject	Location and coordinates	Date	Artist / designer	Type	Material	Dimensions	Designation	Owner / administrator	Wikidata	Notes
	Perceval	Aspire Park, Doha, Qatar 25.260389°N 51.436389°E	2002	Sarah Lucas	Sculpture	Bronze				Q7167048	Depicts a Clydesdale horse and cart, in the manner of a china ornament.
	The Miraculous Journey	Sidra Medical and Research Center, Doha, Qatar 25.3209072°N 51.444655°E	2005 to 2013	Damien Hirst	Series of 14 sculptures	Bronze				Q60775956	Depicts the stages of growth of a human embryo.
More images	John Betjeman	St Pancras station, London 51.530278°N 0.125556°W	2007	Martin Jennings	Statue	Bronze				Q28937184	
More images	Verity	Ilfracombe, Devon, England 51.21088°N 4.11158°W	2012	Damien Hirst	Statue	Bronze (arm & sword in fibreglass)				Q1428547	Cast as over 40 bronze pieces, then assembled onto a stainless steel frame
More images	RAF Bomber Command Memorial	Group statue 51.503333°N 0.148889°W	2012	Philip Jackson		Bronze				Q7275188	Part of a larger memorial, by Liam O'Connor. Jackson won the 2013 Marsh Award for Excellence in Public Sculpture for this work.
	Advocate	Central Square, Newcastle-upon-Tyne, England 54.968085°N 1.614453°W	2014	Bruce Beasley	Statue	Bronze	20 feet (6.1 m)				
More images	Turning	Bicester Arc, Oxford Road, Bicester, England 51.89165°N 1.16271°W	2016	Charlotte Mayer	Abstract sculpture	Bronze			Cherwell District Council		
More images	Mary Seacole	St Thomas' Hospital, Lambeth, London 51.5002°N 0.1189°W	2016	Martin Jennings	Statue	Bronze				Q25311668	
More images	George Orwell	Broadcasting House, London, England 51.5188°N 0.1429°W	2017	Martin Jennings	Statue	Bronze				Q27957168	
	Physical Energy		2017 (1902)	George Frederic Watts	Equestrian statue	Bronze					2017 cast of 1902 work, using new moulds from the original gesso model
	Ayrton Senna	McLaren Technology Centre, Surrey, England	2019	Paul Oz	Statue	Bronze					
	Covid Bell		2022	Grayson Perry	Bell	Bronze					Exhibited at the Royal Academy in summer 2022.
More images	A Soldier's Journey	National World War I Memorial, Washington D.C., United States 38.895992°N 77.033109°W	2024	Sabin Howard	Relief sculpture	Bronze				Q130391408	Cast in multiple sections.
