= Kelvin Okafor =

British hyper-realist artist

Kelvin Okafor // (born 1 November 1985) is a British hyperrealist artist who specialises in pencil portraits.

== Early life and education ==
Okafor is of Nigerian descent. He grew up in Tottenham, London. He was educated at St Ignatius' College in Enfield, where at the age of 15 he began to hone his talent for drawing.

Okafor undertook a Foundation Art & Design course at City and Guilds Art School (2005–06), and went on to study at Middlesex University (2006–09), graduating with a BA degree in Fine Art. Awards he has won include the Catherine Petitgas Visitors Choice Prize, part of the National Open Art Competition. In a recent email interaction with Sunn, Kelvin has said that he's not threatened by advancements of AI even though AI can create realistic art in seconds because spending long hours to complete a portrait is meditation to him.

== Career ==
Okafor can work with sculpture, glass, printmaking, painting and casting. He specialises in hyper-realistic portrait drawings of ordinary people and celebrities. His work is often mistaken for photographs due to their detail and likeness to reality.

The style in which Okafor creates his portraits is known as Hyperrealism. Art Critic, Estelle Lovatt describes his work as 'Emotional Realism'. She mentions how the work of Okafor goes beyond being just 'Photorealist' drawings, and instead coins the term Emotional Realism to describe the affective nature of his artwork.

Okafor's celebrity work has included a portrait of musician John Lennon, which was an integral part of his 2019 Exhibition Retrospective, with work from a 10-year period. With Okafor's 2020 portrait of musician Prince, the original reference photo he used for the piece was transformed by his choice to open Prince's eyes in the portrait, something he had never done before. In late 2020, Okafor featured on Sky's Portrait Artist of the Year where his muse in the competition, Fred Sirieix, selected Okafor's work to keep. He was the featured artist in an episode of the first series of the BBC TV series Extraordinary Portraits, where he drew a portrait of burns survivor Catrin Pugh.

== Solo exhibitions ==
- Portraits, 49 Albemarle Street, London, May 2014
- Interludes, 49 Albemarle Street, London, September–October 2016
- Retrospective, Mall Galleries, London, September 2019
- Kelvin Okafor x W1 Curates, on the shop-front of Flannels store, Oxford Street, London, July 2020, in association with W1 Curates. Included portraits of black people such as Nelson Mandela, Obama, Mike Tyson and Beyonce. Okafor exhibited again with W1 Curates in February 2021, this time dedicated to his portrait of Skepta.
