= Rajinder Singh Dhatt =

British Indian World War II veteran and community leader

Rajinder Singh Dhatt MBE
- ਰਜਿੰਦਰ ਸਿੰਘ ਢੱਟ history
- Born: London
- Occupation: Chairman
- Years active: 1960–2025
- Organization: Undivided Indian Ex-Servicemen's Association

Rajinder Singh Dhatt MBE (Punjabi: ਰਜਿੰਦਰ ਸਿੰਘ ਧੱਤ) (1921–2025) was a British Indian World War II veteran and community leader known for his service in the British Indian Army and his advocacy for the recognition of Indian soldiers' contributions during the war.

== Early life ==
Dhatt was born in Punjab, British India, in 1921. He enlisted in the British Indian Army in 1941 and served in the Burma Campaign, including the battles of Kohima and Imphal.

== Career ==
After migrating to the United Kingdom in the 1960s, Dhatt co-founded the Undivided Indian Ex-Servicemen's Association to support veterans of the British Indian Army. He dedicated his life to raising awareness of South Asian soldiers' sacrifices during World War II, including participating in exhibitions commemorating their service.

== Personal life and legacy ==
Dhatt celebrated his 100th birthday in 2021, receiving tributes from military and community organisations. He died in May 2025 at the age of 103. His legacy lives on through the organisations he helped build and his efforts to ensure the stories of Indian soldiers in World War II are remembered.

== Awards and recognition ==
In 2023, Dhatt was honoured with the Points of Light award by UK Prime Minister Rishi Sunak for his community service and veteran advocacy.

In 2024, he was appointed a Member of the Order of the British Empire (MBE) for his contributions to the South Asian community and veterans.
