= Adebanji Alade =

Painter and TV presenter (born 1972)

- Born: 28 February 1972
- Alma mater: Yaba College of Technology; Heatherley School of Fine Art
- Occupation: Painter, television presenter, illustrator
- Website: adebanjialade.co.uk

Adebanji Alade (born 28 February 1972), also known as "the Addictive Sketcher", is a painter and television presenter, active in the United Kingdom, who serves as president of the Royal Institute of Oil Painters. He is a member of the Guild of Fine Art in Nigeria and of the council of the Chelsea Art Society.

== Early life ==
Alade was born in Hackney, London on 28 February 1972.

Between the ages of 16 and 18, he lost his father, mother and elder brother. His uncle became his mentor and sponsor. Between 1992 and 1997 he obtained a Higher National Diploma in Fine Art from Yaba College of Technology in Nigeria.

He studied at Heatherley School of Fine Art from 2003 to 2005, graduating with a Diploma in Portraiture. He has also taught there.

== Career ==
In 2014 Alade was elected a full member of the Guild of Fine Art, Nigeria. In the same year he became a member of the council of the Chelsea Art Society. He was elected president of the Royal Institute of Oil Painters in 2023 and is its first ever black president.

He is the subject of a 2012 episode of the documentary series Life Of An Artist, and has appeared as artist in residence on BBC Television's The One Show. He recreated the Mona Lisa for a 2021 Channel 4 documentary which he presented. The project was also the subject of a BBC podcast.

Alade was the featured painter in episode five of the third series of Extraordinary Portraits, when he painted a group portrait of six members of the Edwards family, who all work for the NHS.

He illustrated the children's book, Balthazar and His Bendy Bus (2013), by John Lane.

His self-portrait, Skin (2015), is held by the Ruth Borchard Collection.

He has a studio on Lots Road, Chelsea, London.

== Personal life ==
Alade and his wife Ruth live in Belvedere, London, with their two children.

== Publications ==
Alade has authored several books

- The Addictive Sketcher. Search Press. 2020. ISBN 978-1782215820.
- Addictive – An Artist's Sketchbook: Adebanji Alade's sketches of city life. Search Press. 2020.
- Painting People and Places: Capturing everyday life in oils. Search Press. 2024. ISBN 978-1800920323.
