= Caroline Jones (fundraiser) =

English charity fundraiser (born 1968)

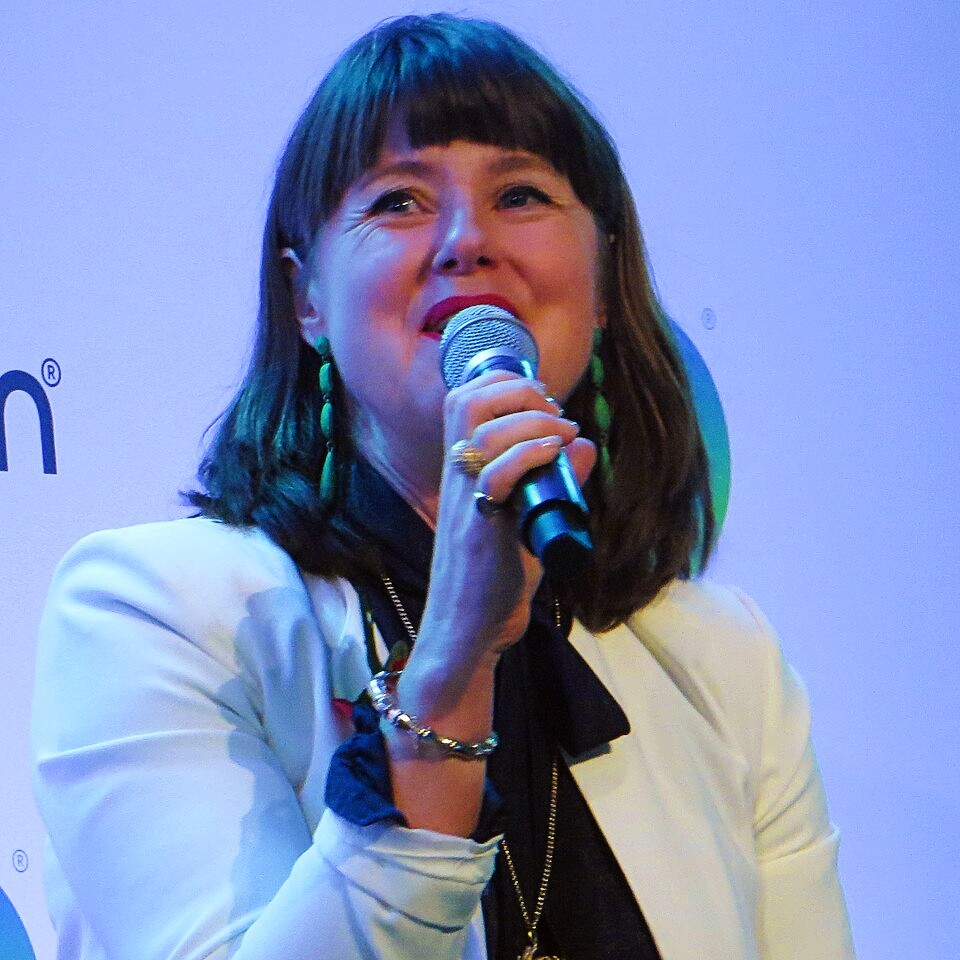
- Jones in 2019
- Born: 1968 (age 57–58); Mancot, Flintshire, Wales
- Occupation: Design agency
- Known for: Raising money for Cancer Research UK after the death of her mother

Caroline Jones (born 1968) is an English charity fundraiser. She started volunteering for Cancer Research UK (CRUK) as a window dresser in Harpenden, Hertfordshire shortly after her mother died of breast cancer in 2014. She received a "Pioneer of the Year" accolade from CRUK's Flame of Hope and a Points of Light award in 2015 for her work wearing different second-hand clothes every day of that year. She originally projected to raise £1,000, but actually raised £43,500 in 2015. She also established Knickers Model's Own that year to commemorate her mother's death. She repeated the charity shop challenge ten years later in 2025.

== Life ==
Caroline Jones was born in Mancot, Flintshire, in 1968, and lived in Chester until was nine years old. She has three children. Jones started volunteering in Harpenden, Hertfordshire, at a Cancer Research UK (CRUK) charity shop as a window dresser (where she arranged donations shown on display windows) shortly after her mother Mary Benson, aged 72, died of breast cancer in October 2014. At the time of her death, Benson had been a CRUK volunteer for thirteen years. Jones established Knickers Model's Own in 2015 to commemorate her mother's death and to financially support CRUK. The name signifies that she still buys new knickers (a type of women's underwear). Other than that, she rarely buys new clothes.

== Fundraising ==
=== Charity shop challenge (2015) ===
Between 1 January and 31 December 2015, she posted pictures of herself wearing a different second-hand charity clothes every day on social media to raise money for Cancer Research UK. She had an idea about the challenge on New Years Eve in 2014. She initially projected to raise £1,000 in a year. However, it went well over her expectations. Therefore, she raised the target to £36,500 (equal to £100 per day) in June 2015 after earning over £11,000 in the first five months. She raised just over £2,600 on 4 November 2015, after a one-off event in Harpenden Public Halls, where she put approximately a thousand items on sale. In the end, she raised more than £43,500 in 2015, £7,000 over her June predictions.

During her 2015 challenge on 16 June, she received a "Pioneer of the Year" accolade from CRUK's Flame of Hope award, where "it came as a real shock" to her. At the end of 2015, she received a Points of Light award from then prime minister David Cameron for her charity shop challenge. He said that "Caroline has come up with an innovative way to pay tribute to her mother and raise a fantastic amount of money for charity". In addition to raising money for CRUK, "Caroline has [also] helped raise awareness of the benefits of shopping in charity shops and that with a little styling outfits can be ethical and fashionable". She responded to the award saying it was "a huge honour", which was "a wonderful way to end [...] the hardest and the most rewarding year of my life". In addition to those two awards, she received a prestigious Creative Fundraiser of the Year Award from JustGiving and raised over £56,000.

=== Fundraising book and podcast ===
The following year, she launched her coffee table book, Knickers Model's Own: A Year of Frugal Fashion, on 25 May 2016. The book features a cover shot from Rankin, one of the greatest fashion photographers. Jones worked on the book for six weeks in February and March of that year, containing all the images of her year of outfits. In 2019, she attended a fundraiser event for Nightingale House Hospice in Flintshire, where her aunt and uncle received palliative care.

In January 2024, JustGiving partnered with Jones and hosted a fundraising-focused podcast, titled What Have I Done? The podcast features ten episodes from each of the ten interviewees including herself and Leah Chowdhry, the first British Asian woman to swim across the English Channel. As of August 2025, she worked for a design agency.

=== Charity shop challenge repeat (2025) ===
Jones restarted the charity shop challenge a decade later in 2025. This time, she posted new pictures with the corresponding one from 2015. By the start of 2025, she had raised approximately £70,000, including sales of her 2016 book, A Year of Frugal Fashion. She was invited to a Buckingham Palace reception for cancer charities on 30 April 2025 for her fundraising support and met the King while wearing an £8.50 dress. She said that the 2025 version was a "year of joy". A CRUK shop in Harpenden where Jones volunteered was shortlisted by the Charity Retail Association. Customers have later voted it the best in the East of England. The customers "praised its friendly staff, community events and 'constantly updated stock'." American Hollywood star Courteney Cox gifted Jones an Yves Saint Laurent bag in late 2025. Cox said that she finds the fundraising campaign "incredible" and "would like to be a part of it".

== Awards ==
Year	Award	Category	Title	Result	Ref.
2015	Pioneer of the Year	Flame of Hope	Cancer Research UK	Won	
2015	Points of Light	Charity shop challenge	Cancer Research UK	Won	
2015	JustGiving	Creative Fundraiser of the Year Award	Cancer Research UK	Won	

== External link ==
- Knickers Models Own
