= Mavis Paterson =

Scottish charity fundraiser and cyclist (born 1938)

Mavis Paterson (born 24 May 1938), also known as Granny Mave, is a Scottish cyclist and fundraiser known for her long-distance charity rides. After beginning cycling in 1991, Paterson has cycled over 10,000 miles (16,000 km) for charity, including two 6,000-mile (9,700 km) routes around the United Kingdom and Canada. The proceeds from these rides were donated to Breast Cancer Care and Macmillan Cancer Support. Paterson's fundraising efforts have led her to receive various awards, including Macmillan Cancer Support's Sir Hugh Dundas Award and a Points of Light award.

== Fundraising ==
Paterson began cycling in 1991 to combat her osteoarthritis. Following her sister, Alex Gardner, being diagnosed with breast cancer, Paterson cycled 6,000 miles around the United Kingdom to raise money for Breast Cancer Care.

In 2008, Paterson cycled 6,000 miles for charity with Penny Weir, a fellow Scottish cyclist. The route took place around Canada—from Vancouver to Newfoundland—and took four months to complete. The proceeds collected from the cycle totalled £20,000 and were donated to Macmillan Cancer Support. A documentary about the cycle named The Big Bike Ride was produced by the BBC and broadcast on 12 November.

Paterson completed another cycling route in 2019, when she rode the 960-mile (1,540 km) route from Land's End to John o' Groats alongside Heather Curley. She was inspired to do this by the deaths of her three children within the space of four years. The 23-day cycle, which began on 30 May, raised over £60,000 for Macmillan Cancer Support and made Paterson the oldest woman to cycle the route (aged 81). This record was recognised by Guinness World Records. Refreshments were provided during the ride by the Scottish confectionery company Tunnock's.

For her 80th birthday, Paterson cycled for 24 hours around the Rhins of Galloway, raising a total of £4,000.

In 2023, Paterson completed another route around the United Kingdom, cycling 1,000 miles (1,600 km) around the country from Glenluce, Wigtownshire, to the Mull of Galloway. The ride began on 29 April and finished on 30 May. During the cycle, she had her 85th birthday. An amount of £56,000 was raised, which was again donated to Macmillan Cancer Support. A Scottish Parliament motion was raised by Finlay Carson on 9 May to formally recognise Paterson's efforts. Carson stated: "Mavis is an inspiration and thoroughly deserves all the credit and praise for her fund-raising efforts over the last two decades."

== Personal life ==
Paterson was born on 24 May 1938. She lives in Dumfries and Galloway, Scotland. Paterson was married to John, who died in 1996. Together, they had three children—Sandy, Bob and Katie—who died while in their 40s.

== Awards ==
- Endurance Fundraiser of the Year (2019) – JustGiving Awards
- Regional Pride of Britain Awards winner (2019)
- National Pride of Britain Awards finalist (2019)
- Points of Light award (2019) – award no. 1232, given by Theresa May
- Sir Hugh Dundas Award (2020) – award given by Macmillan Cancer Support to recognise "those who have made significant contributions to Macmillan"
