= Charlotte Mayer =

British sculptor (1929–2022)

Charlotte Mayer FRSS
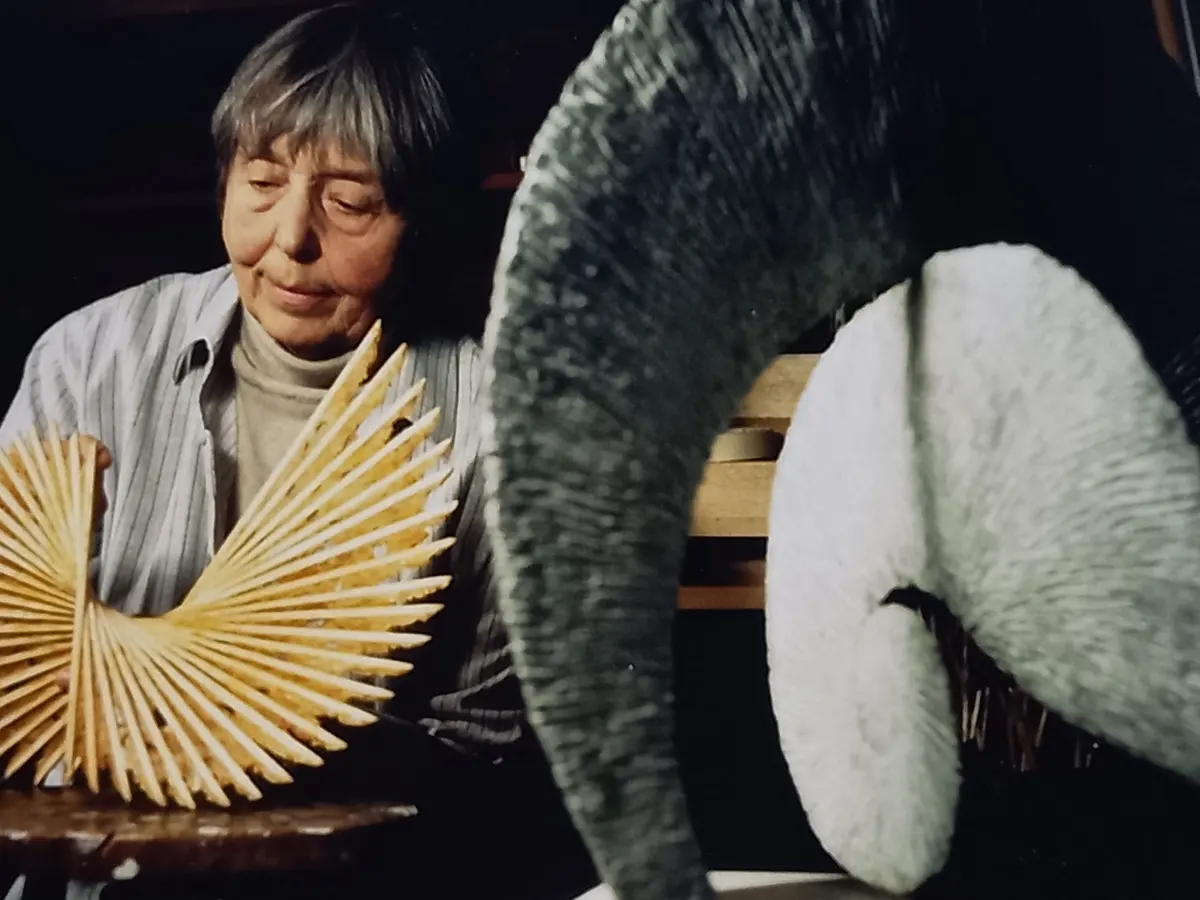
- Mayer in her studio
- Born: Charlotte Renée Fanta-Stutz; 4 January 1929; Prague, Czechoslovakia
- Died: 9 November 2022 (aged 93); London, United Kingdom
- Education: Goldsmiths, University of London; Royal College of Art
- Spouse: Geoffrey Salmon
- Children: Julian Salmon; Antonia Salmon; Louise Salmon
- Parents: Kurt Fanta (father); Helen Stutzová (mother)
- Elected: Fellow of the Royal Society of Sculptors

Charlotte Mayer (4 January 1929 – 9 November 2022) was a Czech-born British sculptor.

== Early life and education ==
Mayer was born in Prague, the only child of Kurt Fanta and Helen Marie Stutzová. Kurt and Helen divorced in 1937, and two years later Helen married Ludwig “Frederick” Mayer. In 1939, aged 10, Mayer and her mother emigrated to the United Kingdom to flee the Nazi occupation of Czechoslovakia.

Despite pleas from Helen, Mayer’s maternal grandparents, Růžena and Eduard Stutz, chose not to accompany their daughter and granddaughter to the UK, and remained in Prague. In 1942, Růžena was transported to the Theresienstadt Ghetto, and subsequently to the Treblinka extermination camp, where she was murdered. In a televised interview, Mayer stated that Růžena and Eduard were “the most important people” in her life.

In 1945, Mayer studied Fine Art at Goldsmiths, University of London, under the tutelage of Edward Folkard, Harold Wilson Parker and Ivor Roberts-Jones. She continued her studies at the Royal College of Art, enrolling in 1950. Her tutors at this time included Frank Dobson, John Skeaping and Heinz Henghes. While at the RCA, Mayer met her future husband, the architect Geoffrey Salmon. They married in 1952.

== Work ==
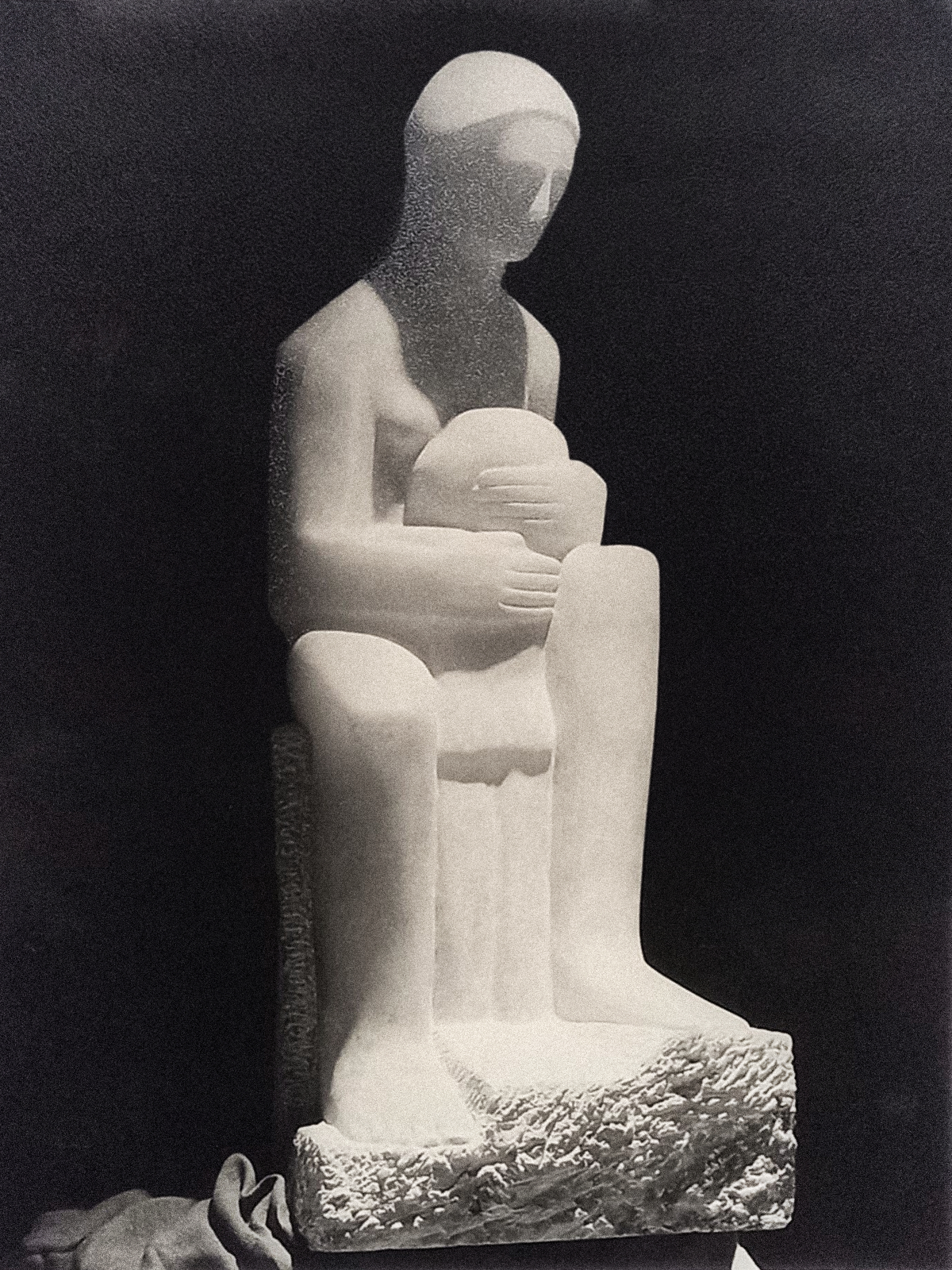
Mother & Child, commissioned for Epsom General Hospital, Surrey

Mayer received her first public commission in 1953: Mother and Child, a carved alabaster piece for the maternity ward of Epsom General Hospital. The sculpture, however, was criticised as being “too modern”, and never put on display.

Following a twelve-year hiatus to focus on raising her three children, Mayer returned to sculpture in the mid-1960s. Initially producing human figures, a visit to New York City in 1967 inspired a series of timber – and later steel – sculptures entitled Black Cities. Mayer’s fascination with modern cities continued into the 1970s, and the ring-like forms of Source, Cascade, Flow and Nebula stem from her observations of smoke rising from Battersea Power Station.

Mayer also began periodically producing animal sculptures throughout the next few decades. In 1979, a commission from Johnson & Johnson for a new office headquarters in Slough led to the creation of Caring Hands.

In the early 1980s, Mayer began to work with the Pangolin Editions foundry. This collaboration led to bronze, silver and steel castings of her subsequent sculptures.

Mayer’s interest in spiral forms permeates her work. In 1984, three years after the Toxteth riots, Sea Circle was installed in central Liverpool. The 240cm high ammonite-inspired bronze sculpture followed smaller whorled table and wall pieces, Voyager (1994), and Journey, now situated on the University of Northampton’s campus.

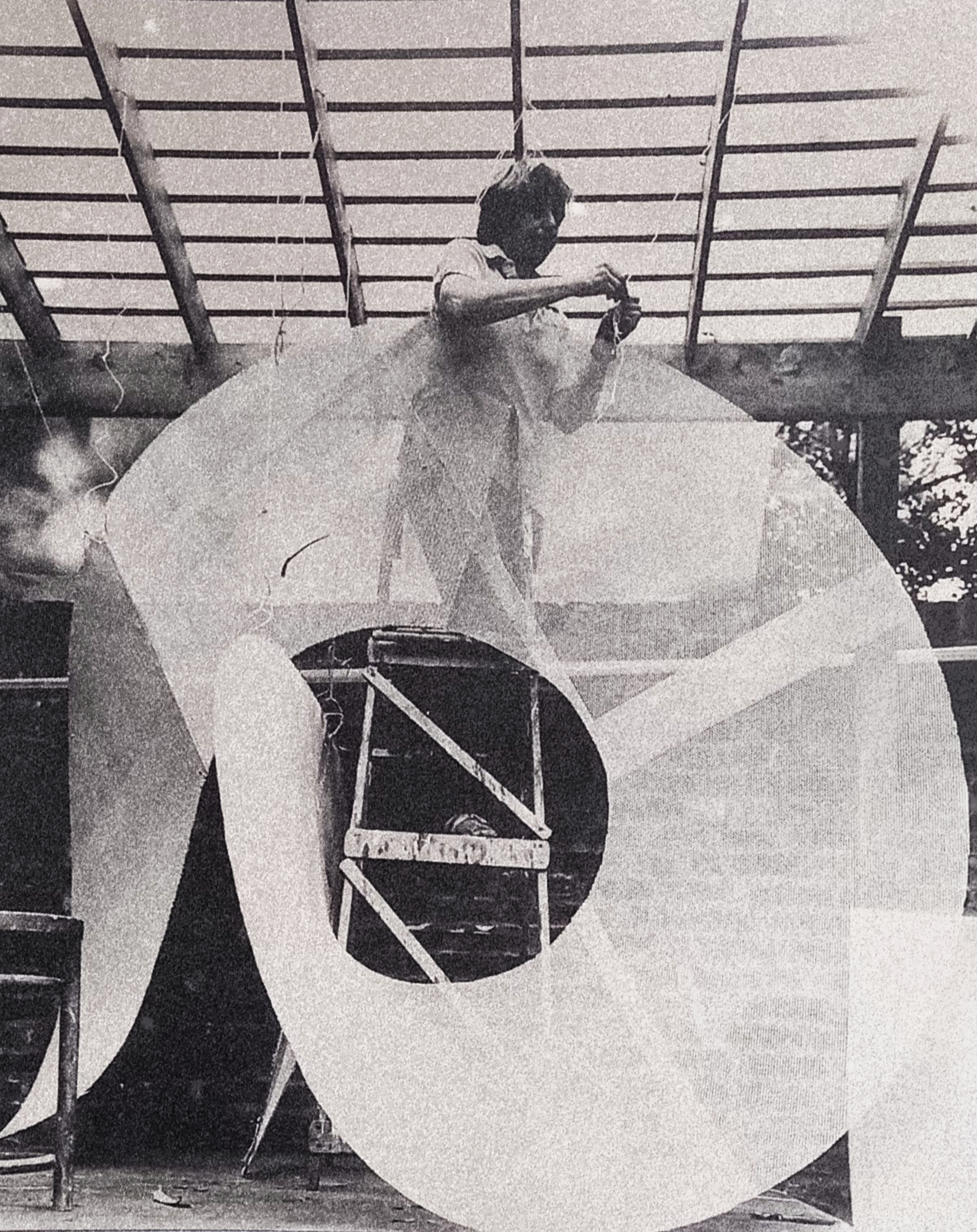
Mayer working on the prototype for Sea Circle

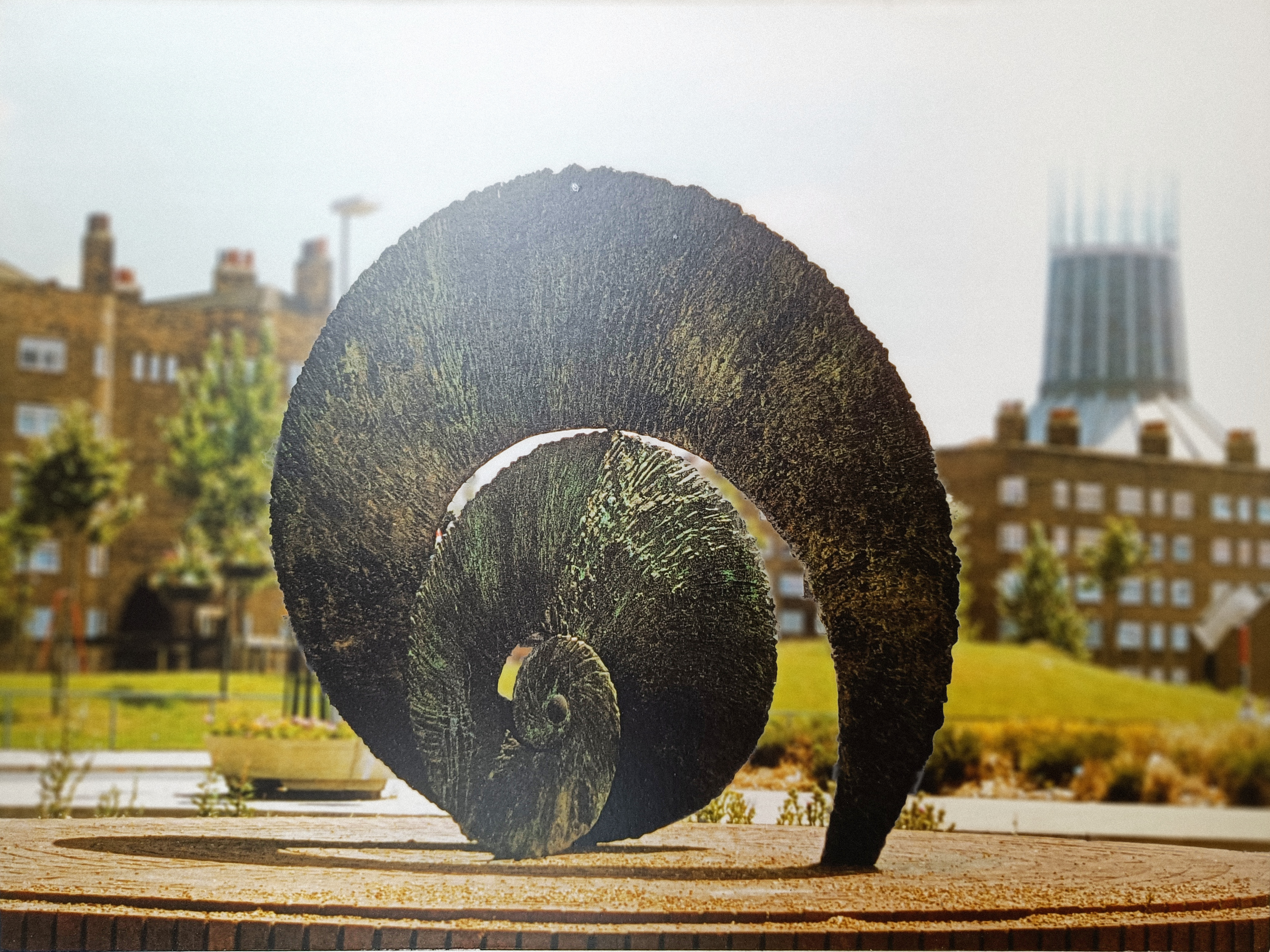
Sea Circle, Liverpool

Further major commissions during the 1990s and 2000s included Ascent (1991) for London’s Barbican Estate, Tree of Life (1992) for the North London Hospice, Wind & Fire (1997) for BNP Paribas’ UK headquarters, and Pharus (2000) for the Cass Sculpture Foundation. Ascent won the Royal Society of British Sculptors Silver Medal, and led to Mayer’s election as a Fellow of the Royal Society of Sculptors.

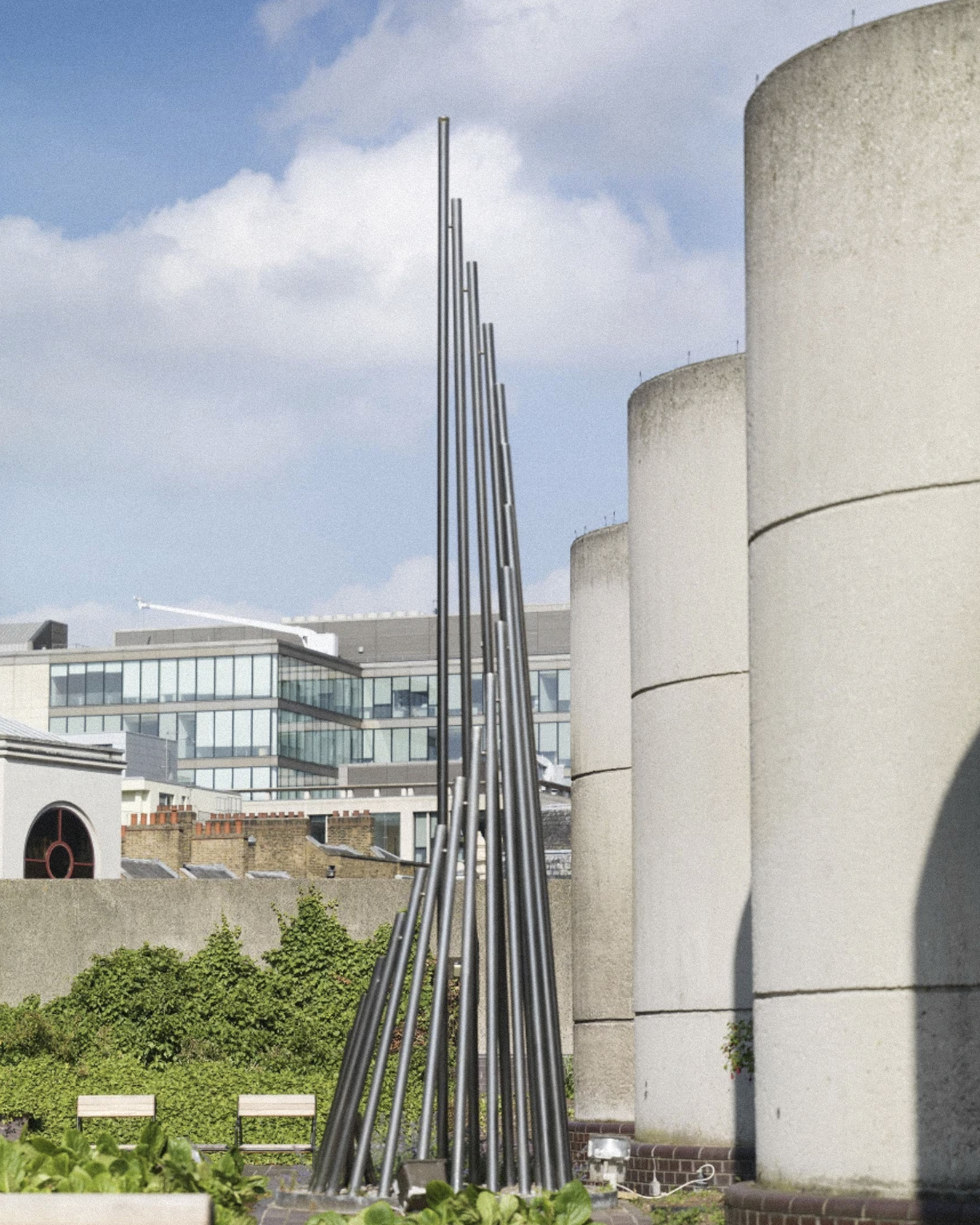
Ascent, Barbican, London

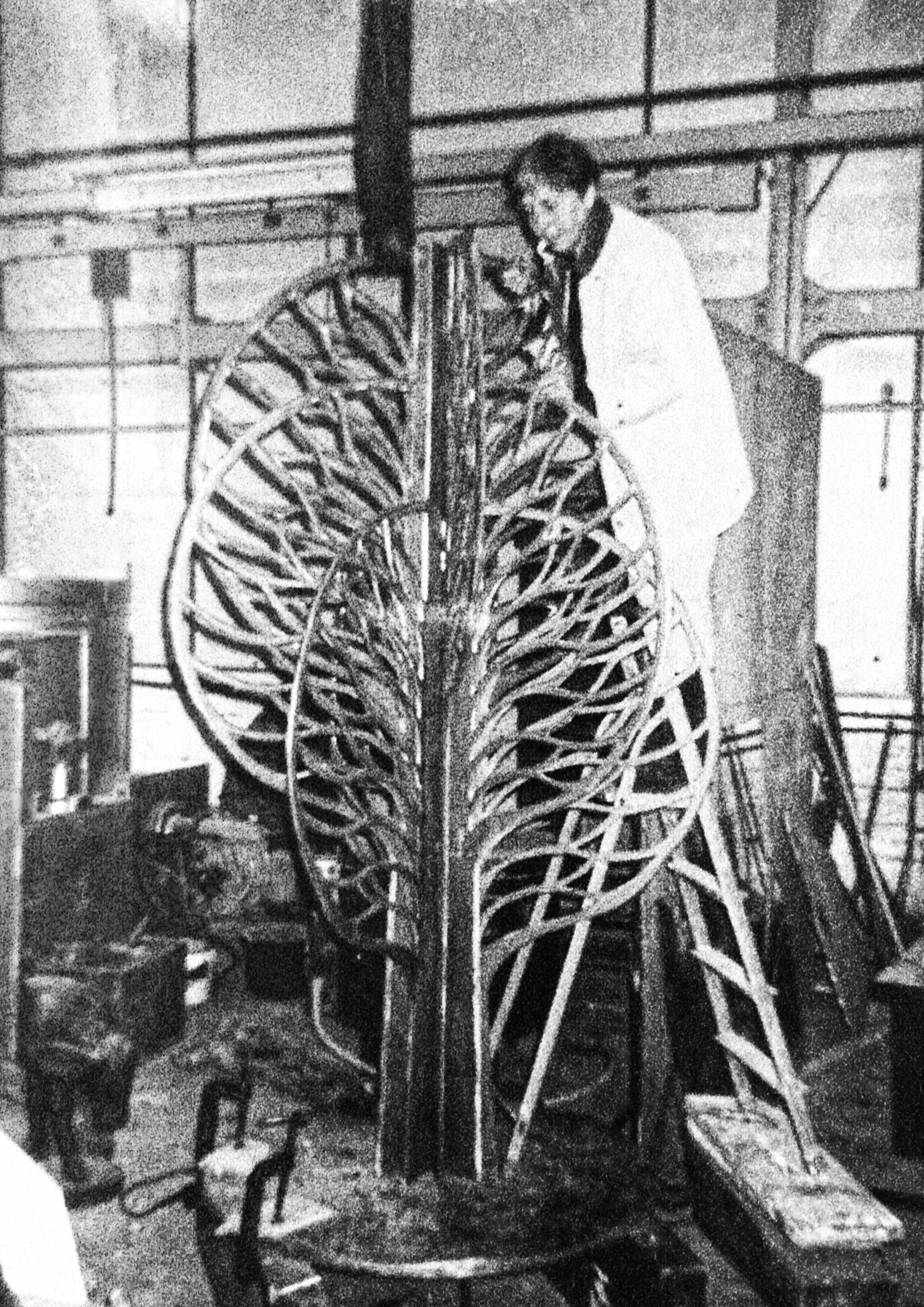
Mayer working on Tree of Life

Mayer’s works drew influence from her regular practice of meditation, as well as seismic events in her personal life: Tree of Life, and later further tree-inspired forms such as Joy, Unity, Abundance, Friendship, Laughter and Hope (2006) stem from the impact of the death of her son Julian in 1989.

In 2006, through the creation of Thornflower, Mayer confronted her experience of the Holocaust, and the personal impact of the loss of her grandmother, Růžena Stutzová. Mayer gradually came to regard the work not only as a Holocaust Memorial piece, but as a sculpture that speaks of reconciliation and unity in times of darkness and inhumanity. In 2019, the piece joined the permanent collection at Coventry Cathedral.

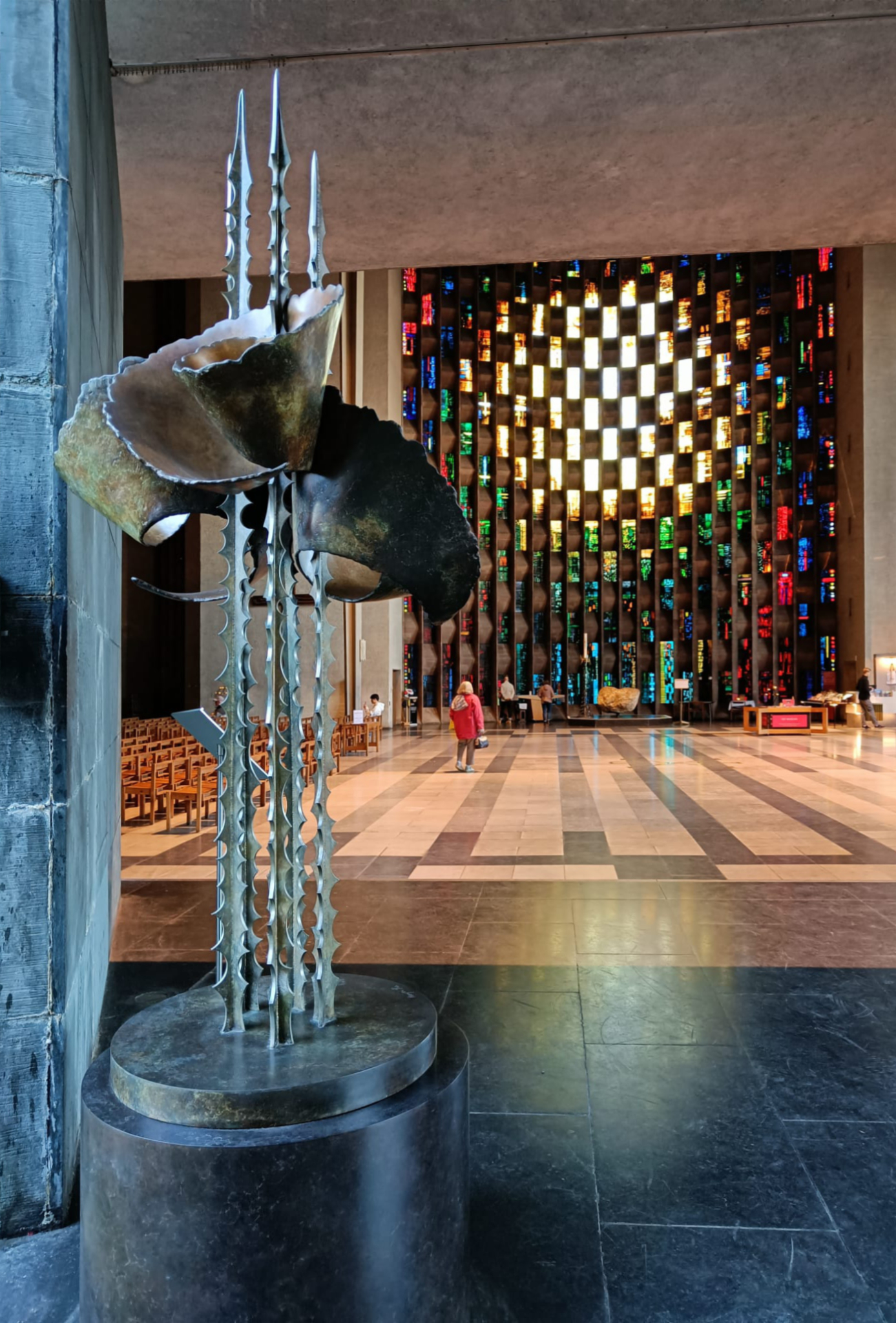
Thornflower, Coventry Cathedral

Mayer continued to work consistently until her death in 2022, experimenting with a wide range of media and painting. Notable pieces included Solar (2009), Guardian (2009), and Monumental Turning (2016). Commissioned for a new office park development in Bicester, the latter is Mayer’s largest sculpture to date.

=== Exhibitions ===
- Hodgkins/Hubbard/Mayer, Royal Society of British Artists, 1999
- Solo Show, Ashbourne Gallery, Derbyshire, 1999
- Charlotte Mayer – Recent Sculptures, Gallery Pangolin, Gloucestershire
- Sculpture 2000, Milton Keynes General Hospital, 2000
- Bronze: Contemporary British Sculpture, Holland Park, London, 2000
- Solo Show, Bohun Gallery, Henley on Thames, 2002
- Sterling Stuff, RA Friends' Room, London, 2003; Sigurjon Olafsson Museum, Reykjavík, 2003; Gallery Pangolin, Gloucestershire, 2002
- Deirdre Hubbard & Charlotte Mayer, Thompson’s Gallery, London, 2003
- Solo show, Matara Centre, Gloucestershire, 2004
- Sculpture in the Garden: RBS Centenary, University of Leicester, 2005
- Quartet – Four Czech Sculptors, Curwen & New Academy Gallery, London, 2005
- Fe_{2}O_{5} Gili, Mayer, Rance, Tebbenhoff, Vollmer, Canary Wharf, London, 2006, APT Gallery, London, 2006, & Myles Meehan Gallery, Darlington, 2005
- Solo show, Rachel Bebb Contemporary, Hampshire, 2006
- All Female Cast, Gallery Pangolin, Gloucestershire, 2006
- Sterling Stuff II, Pangolin London, 2008
- Fire and Brimstone, Gallery Pangolin, Gloucestershire, 2009
- The Thornflower & other works, Salisbury Cathedral, 2009
- The Thornflower, Southwark Cathedral, London, 2010
- Crucible, Gloucester Cathedral, 2010
- Mayer & Von Stumm, Turrill Garden, Oxford, 2011
- Women Make Sculpture, Pangolin London, 2011
- Sculptors’ Drawings, Pangolin London, 2012
- Two in One: Charlotte Mayer & Almuth Tebbenhoff, Pangolin London, 2012
- Charlotte Mayer: The Space Between, Pangolin London, 2019
- Feathers, Bones & Stones, Pangolin London, 2021
- Charlotte Mayer: A Life in the Studio, Pangolin London, 2023
