= Eddie Brocklesby =

Oldest British woman to complete an Ironman triathlon

- Other names: Iron Gran
- Occupation: Director
- Awards: British Empire Medal (2019 New Year Honours)

Edwina Brocklesby BEM (1943–) is the founder and director of Silverfit, a charity dedicated to the promotion of the health benefits of physical activity for older people. and triathlete.

Eddie started running at age 50 following the loss of her husband to cancer, and at the age of 74 became the oldest British woman to complete an Ironman triathlon.

Born in 1943 Edwina was a social worker for 50 years, educated at the University of Nottingham with a bachelor's degree in Economics and Maths and then the University of Leicester with a PhD thesis titled "Just letterbox? : a study of indirect contact in adoption" in 2004.

Now based in Surrey, Edwina is a mother of three and grandmother of four. She has spent the last twenty years taking part in marathons, triathlons and Ironman races across the globe, has represented GB in many European and World triathlon and duathlon championships, cycled in a 4-person relay of over 3000 miles across America (Race Across AMerica) and completed five further Ironman triathlons

Brocklesby founded Silverfit in 2013, a charity devoted to increasing physical activity and social inclusion for older people – having fun. It has gone from strength to strength and is now a success in 17 venues across 9 London boroughs.

In April 2018 Brocklesby became a published author with the release of her autobiography, Irongran; leading to a wide range of TV, Radio, national and local newspaper and magazine appearances.

She was awarded the British Empire Medal in the 2019 New Year Honours "for services to the health and wellbeing of older people".

In 2019 she was given a "Special Excellence Award" by the University of Nottingham.

She was painted by Caroline Pool for a 2026 episode of the BBC Television series Extraordinary Portraits. The programme revealed that, at 82, she was in preparation for a half-Ironman event.
