= Jemisha Maadhavji =

British painter (born 1996)

Jemisha Maadhavji (born 1996) is a British painter.

== Early life ==
Maadhavji is from Leicester and of Gujarati Indian descent. She started drawing portraits at age 14. She graduated from De Montfort University with a Bachelor of Arts (BA) in Fine Art.

== Career ==
Maadhavji is best known for her figurative paintings and portraits, that have been exhibited in the Nottingham Castle Museum & Art Gallery, and have been featured in Harper's Bazaar and Vogue. A graduate of De Montfort University, she is the recipient of the Christopherson Collection Award and the Two Queens Graduate Award from the university. In 2023, she was the featured artist in an episode of Extraordinary Portraits on BBC1.
