= Brock Elbank =

British photographer

Brock Elbank is a photographer. Born in 1973 in Warwickshire, England, currently living in London. He received media attention in 2013 for his photo series #Project60. Commissioned by Isabella Blow for The Sunday Times Style, he began his career shooting women's fashion. Working in the UK, US and Australia, Elbank's bold distinctive approach led to male styling and portraiture for clients like Nike, Coca-Cola, San Pellegrino, Toyota, Dove and Snickers, for which he won an advertising award in 2004.

For nearly a decade, Elbank lived in Sydney where his work became more art based, moving away from professional models and exploring everyday characters and objects, celebrating the idiosyncratic beauty of imperfect features. It was in Australia that Elbank began his personal beard photography project and where he met charity campaigner Jimmy Niggles. Upon his return to the UK in 2013, Elbank embarked upon the #Project60 series as well as new work on the same theme specially for the Somerset House show.

Brock Elbank has photographed 90 striking subjects for the photo series and is aiming to collect 150 portraits before #Freckles exhibits in 2017.

He was the featured artist in an episode of the third series of the BBC TV series Extraordinary Portraits, where he took a portrait photograph of Araf Saddiq, Scotland's first Asian paramedic.
