= Lonely Girls Club =

UK-based Women's Community

The Lonely Girls Club
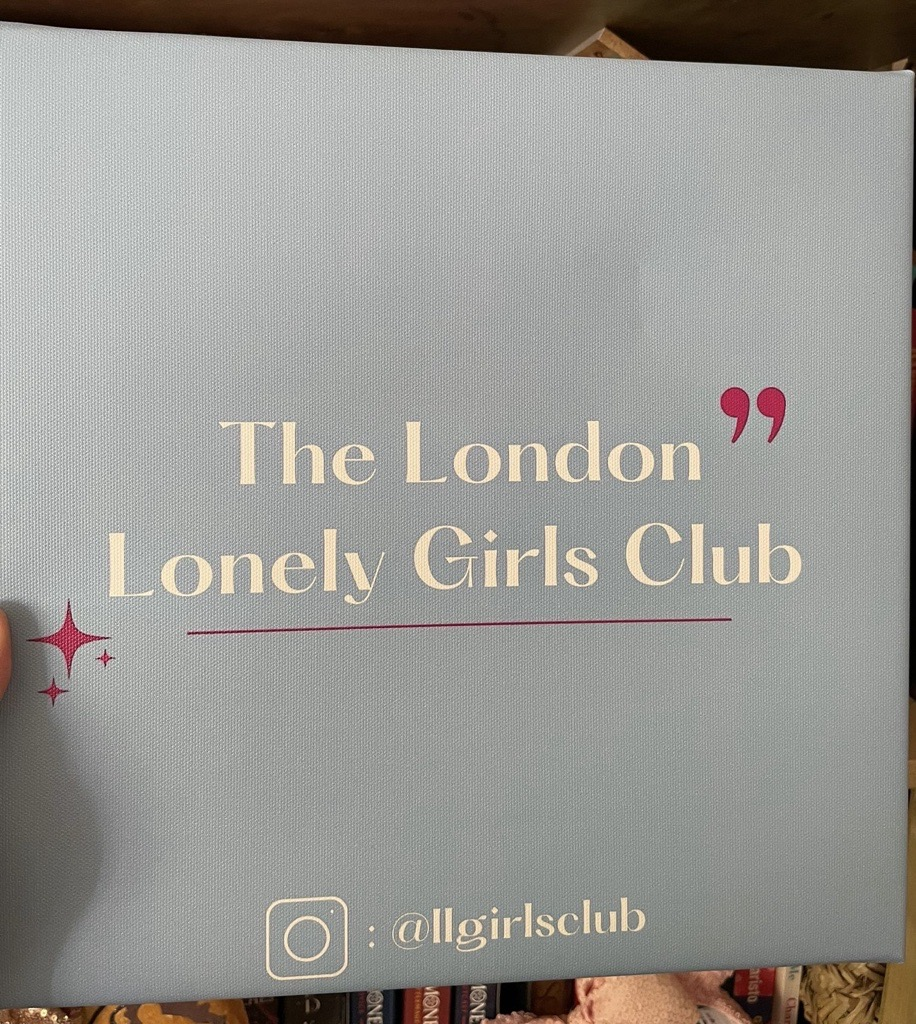
- Nickname: LGC
- Formation: November 2018
- Founder: Holly Cooke
- Headquarters: London, United Kingdom
- Location: London, Manchester, Nottingham, Birmingham, Brighton, Edinburgh, York, Stoke-on-Trent
- CEO: Holly Cooke
- Website: https://www.llgc.co.uk/

The Lonely Girls Club (LGC) is an organisation based in the United Kingdom that aims to promote friendship, and reduce loneliness and social isolation amongst adult women. The organisation claims to have a membership of over 170,000 members across 8 branches. According to The Washington Post, "Members range from age 18 to 70, and the average age is around 28."

The club was founded by Holly Cooke (aged 22 at the time) in November 2018, with the launch of the organisation's first branch, The London Lonely Girls Club. As the organisation expanded to other United Kingdom locations, Cooke rebranded to The Lonely Girls Club. Cooke is the CEO and director of The Lonely Girls Club Ltd, incorporated in March 2024.

== History ==
Cooke moved to London from Stoke-on-Trent in 2018 after graduating with a degree in Fashion Communication from Nottingham Trent University. She says she found her new city lonely and isolating. Cooke now says that most of her friendships initially stemmed from her work at LGC.

== Growth ==
Following the organisation's expansion, Cooke and LGC now advertise weekly social events across all branches. Previous events have included co-working days, retreats, brunches, friendship speed-dating, book clubs, walks, exercise classes, paint and sip classes, and theatre outings. Lowest cost events involve a ticket price of £1-£5. Event tickets sell out in minutes, according to Cooke.

The London Lonely Girls Facebook group had 10,000 members at the beginning of 2022, and grew to over 30,000 in the space of 12 months. In September 2026, it had reached a membership of over 101,000.

== Branches ==
As of February 2026, the organisation has eight operational branches across the UK; London (2018), Manchester (2023), Nottingham (2023), Birmingham (2024), Brighton (2025), Edinburgh (2025), York (2025), and Stoke-on-Trent (2025). On 8 September 2026, Cooke took to Instagram to tease the launch of a ninth branch, sharing a word search containing the word, Sheffield.

== Partnerships, recognition, and media coverage ==
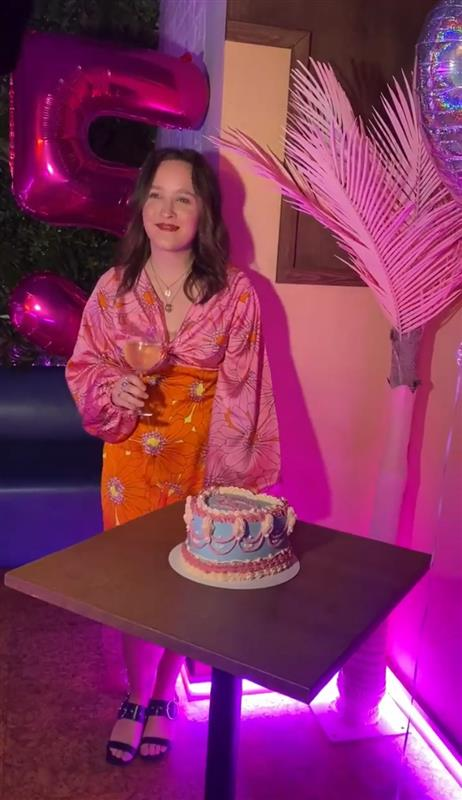
Cooke at London Lonely Girls Club Fifth Birthday, November 2023

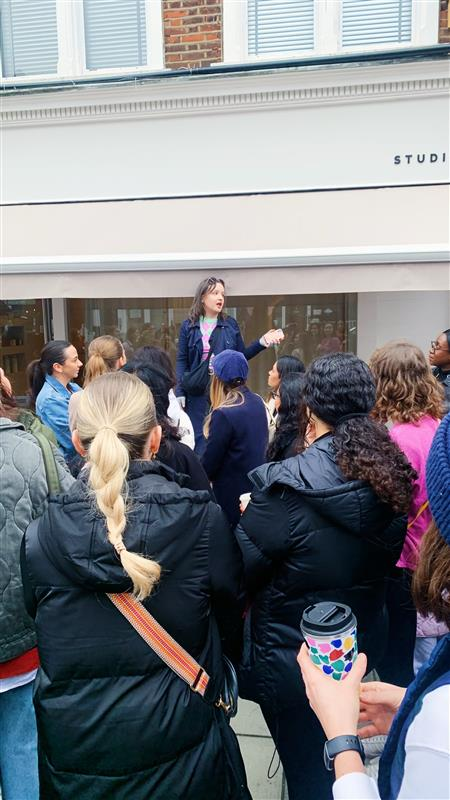
Cooke greets attendees at London Lonely Girls Club walk event in Clapham, London, 17 February 2024

The Lonely Girls Club has promoted partnerships with brands including Kate Spade, Chelsea F.C., TodayTix, and Battersea Dogs and Cats Home.

In June 2023, Cooke and The Lonely Girls Club were recognised by 10 Downing Street with the Points of Light Award. The description reads, "The award for Holly comes during Loneliness Awareness Week, which aims to address the issues around loneliness and highlight how it can affect mental health."

In 2025, Cooke and The Lonely Girls Club were the subject of a short documentary by Washington D.C.-born film-maker Katie Blake entitled, "The Lonely Girls Club". In the documentary, Cooke spoke about her personal experiences of childhood bullying, and described her new understanding of adult female friendship as being, "lifegiving, supportive, caring, fun... rather than something where you are beaten down, hurt, viewed as less than".
