= George Groves (artist) =

British artist

George Groves (born 1999) is an English contemporary portrait artist, based in Buckinghamshire.

In 2022, Groves unveiled one of his most notable portraits of British astronaut Major Tim Peake, and is also known for his portraits of Mark Ormrod, Idris Elba and Christine Ohuruogu.

His portrait of Muhammad Ali is in the permanent collection at the Muhammad Ali Center, in Louisville, Kentucky.

== Personal life ==
Groves works from his studio in Gerrards Cross, and practices meditation and mindfulness to encourage his creativity.
