= Christy Lee Rogers =

American underwater photographer

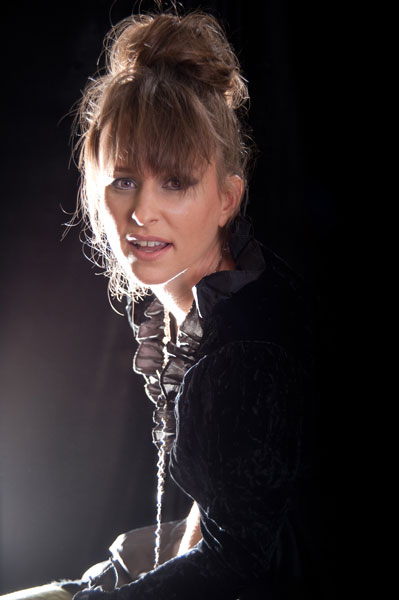
- Occupation: Photographer
- Known for: Underwater photography
- Movement: WaterAmore
- Website: christyrogers.com

Christy Lee Rogers is an fine art photographer, known for her works taken underwater.

== Early life ==
Rogers was born in Honolulu, Hawaii and grew up in Kailua, on the island of Oahu.

== Career ==
Rogers’ works have been exhibited globally from Paris, London, Italy, Mexico City to Shanghai, São Paulo, South Africa, Los Angeles and more, and are held in private and public collections throughout the world. She has been featured in international magazines including Vogue, Harper’s Bazaar Art China, Elle Decoration, Global Times, The Independent, Casa Vogue, Photo Technique, Photo Korea and others.

Rogers’ "Reckless Unbound" is currently housed at Longleat House in the UK. She is a two time finalist for the Contemporary Talents Award from the Fondation François Schneider in France. Rogers' art has been featured on several album covers, including “Orchesography” for the 80’s band Wang Chung, and her images were selected for the 2013–2014 performance season of the Angers-Nantes Opéra in France.

In 2019 she won Open Photographer of the Year at the Sony World Photography Awards and in 2020 she created the cover image for the 2021 Lavazza Calendar ‘The New Humanity.’

Rogers is known for her underwater photography, which has been exhibited in the United States, France, and Monaco. Her work was commissioned by Deutsche Grammophone to provide the album cover art for a boxed set of classical music, and by Apple to create underwater images with the iPhone 11 Pro. She was the featured artist in an episode of the first series of the BBC TV series Extraordinary Portraits, where she took a portrait photograph of model Cee Cee, a model who has albinism.

== Collections ==
- Siren (2009)
- Odyssey (2010)
- Reckless Unbound (2012)
- Of Smoke and Gold (2013)
- Elan (2014)
- Celestial Bodies (2015)
- A Quarter of a Million Miles (2016)
- Hybrids (2017)
- Muses (2018)
- Human (2020)
- Bioluminescence (2022)

== Exhibitions & Awards ==
- Marco Polo Airport, Ten Arts Paris, Venice, Italy (April 15 - December 15, 2022)
- Method & Concept, “The Underwater Photography of Christy Lee Rogers”, Naples, Florida (January 13 - February 25, 2022)
- Art Labor Gallery, “Human”, Shanghai, China (May 15 - June 30, 2021)
- Laura Rathe Fine Art, “Tidepools”, Houston, Texas (Jan. 14 - Feb, 11, 2021)
- Centre Pastoral Saint-Merry, Ten Arts Paris, Installation, Paris, France (Dec 23 2020 - Jan 27, 2021)
- Minnesota Marine Art Museum, “Christy Lee Rogers - Baroque Water Worlds”, Minnesota, US (May 8 - September 6, 2020)
- Art Labor Gallery, “Harmony”, Shanghai, China (Aug 25 - Sept. 15, 2019)
- Miller Gallery, "Weightless", Cincinnati, Ohio (July 25 - Aug. 27, 2019)
- Laura Rathe Fine Art, "Changing Tides", Dallas, Texas (Jan. 5 - Feb. 9, 2019)
- Art Labor Gallery, "Muses", Shanghai, China (June 23 - August 8, 2018)
- Angers Nantes Opéra House, Grand Théâtre d'Angers, Ten Arts, “Le lyrisme des abysses - Retrospective Show”, Angers, France (Sept. 19 - Nov. 20, 2014)
- The Outsiders Gallery, Lazarides, “Élan", London, United Kingdom (June 12 - July 19, 2014)
- Honolulu Museum of Arts - Academy Arts Center at Linekona, "An Underwater Odyssey", Honolulu, Hawaii (2011)
- Let There Be Art Gallery, “Celestial Bodies", Mexico City, Mexico (August 6, 2015 September 6, 2015)

Awards
Year	Contest	Award	Artwork
2018	Sony World Photography Awards	Photographer of the Year	"Harmony"
2018	London International Creative Competition	Honorable Mention	"A Conversation with Angels"
2018	London International Creative Competition	Honorable Mention	"Color High"
2018	Sony World Photography Awards	First Place	"Harmony"
2018	Tokyo International Foto Awards	Silver Award	"Muses"
2018	One Eyeland Photography Awards	Silver Award	"Muses"
2018	Chromatic Photography Awards	Second Place	"Muses"
2019	Moscow International Creative Competition	Silver Award	"Muses"
2019	Trierenberg Super Circuit	Gold Medal	"Creation"
