= Extraordinary Portraits =

- Presented by: Tinie Tempah (series 1 & 2); Bill Bailey (series 3-)
- Country of origin: United Kingdom
- No. of series: 5
- No. of episodes: 30

Production
- Production company: Chatterbox Media

Original release
- Network: BBC Television
- Release: 14 February 2022

Extraordinary Portraits is a BBC Television series produced by Chatterbox Media, in which members of the public who have a notable achievement are paired with an artist to have their portrait painted, or in some cases drawn, photographed, or sculpted. It first aired on 14 February 2022.

The first two series were presented by Tinie Tempah; series three to five by Bill Bailey. All the sitters in series three were related to the NHS, to mark its 75th anniversary.

An exhibition of works from the first two series was held at Turner Contemporary in 2022. From 13 March to 6 April 2025, during Bradford's year as UK City of Culture, an exhibition of the portraits from series four was held at the city's Loading Bay venue.

Series four and five were filmed at Kelmarsh Hall in Northampton.

== Episodes ==
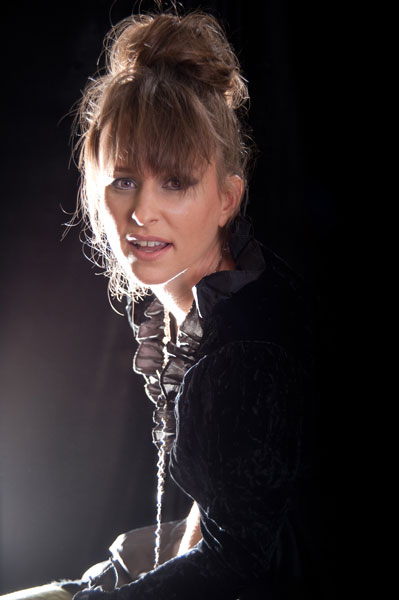
Christy Lee Rogers, seen in 2011

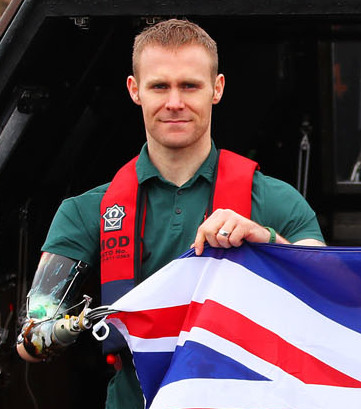
Mark Ormrod, seen in 2017

- 1:1. Twin sisters Georgia and Melissa Laurie, who survived a crocodile attack, painted by Roxana Halls
- 1:2. Model Cee Cee, who has albinism, photographed underwater by Christy Lee Rogers
- 1:3. Patrick Hutchinson, painted by Dale Grimshaw
- 1:4. Burns survivor Catrin Pugh, drawn by Kelvin Okafor
- 1:5. Former Royal Marine Mark Ormrod, painted by Thomas Croft — the abstract background was painted by Ormrod's children Mason and Evie
- 1:6. 88-year-old farmer Alec Burrough, painted by Caroline Pool
- 2:1. Fundraiser and cancer survivor Harriet Middleton, painted by Stuart Pearson Wright — who subsequently donated his painting to Shetland Museum
- 2:2. Charlotte Banfield, who has cerebral palsy, photographed by Bella Kotak
- 2:3. Footballer Jahmal Howlett-Mundle, painted by Lo Lo
- 2:4. Powerlifter Karenjeet Kaur Bains, painted by Amar Stewart
- 2:5. Jamie Dalgoutte, painted by Ross Muir
- 2:6. Teacher Christian Foley, painted by Laura Quinn Harris
- 3:1. Trauma surgeon Martin Griffiths, sculpted by Nick Elphick
- 3:2. Doctor Grace Spence Green, painted by Jemisha Maadhavji
- 3:3. Araf Saddiq, Scotland's first Asian paramedic, photographed by Brock Elbank
- 3:4. Jules Lewis, an end-of-life care nurse, painted by Belinda Eaton
- 3:5. Six members of the Edwards family, painted by Adebanji Alade
- 3:6. Hospital porter Holly Crawshaw, with her daughter Renae, painted by Mark Draisey
- 4:1. Clare Sacco, who founded a charity after receiving a diagnosis of incurable cancer, painted by Oriane Pierrepoint
- 4:2. Rizwan Javed, painted by Jack Dickson
- 4:3. Gill Sayell, painted by David James
- 4:4. Former paratrooper Christian Lewis, sculpted by Hywel Pratley
- 4:5. Foster carers Marva and Lionel Warmington, painted by Chloe Cox
- 4:6. Down's syndrome campaigner Millie Anna, painted by Karen Turner
- 5:1. Darryn Frost, a hero of the 2019 London Bridge stabbings, sculpted by Nick Elphick
- 5:2. Eddie Brocklesby, aka ‘Iron Gran’, an 82-year-old female Ironman triathlete, painted by Caroline Pool
- 5:3. Lindsay McKenna, who runs a rescue centre for exotic animals, painted by Ricky Wilson
- 5:4. Two brothers, Jordan and Cian Adams, who raise finds for Alzheimer's Research UK after being given a prognosis of inherited early-onset frontotemporal dementia, painted by Unza Saleem
- 5:5. Seema Misra, a victim of the British Post Office scandal, who subsequently worked for justice for other victims, painted by Jack Dickson
- 5:6. Sisters Amy Purdie and Grace Davidson, donor and recipient respectively, in the UK's first successful womb transplant, painted by Karen Turner
