= Nick Elphick =

British sculptor (born 1979)

- Born: 1979; Chester
- Alma mater: St David's College; Coleg Menai; Loughborough University
- Occupation: Sculptor
- Website: nickelphicksculpture.co.uk

Nick Elphick (born 1979) is a British sculptor, known for his public artworks and appearances on television.

== Early life and education ==
Gerald Nicholas Tunstall Elphick was born in Chester, England, in 1979 and moved to Llandudno, Wales, aged 11 or 12, in order to attend St David’s College due to his severe dyslexia. The college encouraged his pursuit of art. To develop his skills, he did jobs in theatre set design and for the bronze casting foundry Pangolin Editions.

He eventually became a sculptor, and lived for a time in a studio without running water, as he could not afford a separate home.

He took an art foundation course at Coleg Menai, and in 2022 graduated with a degree in fine art from Loughborough University.

== Career ==
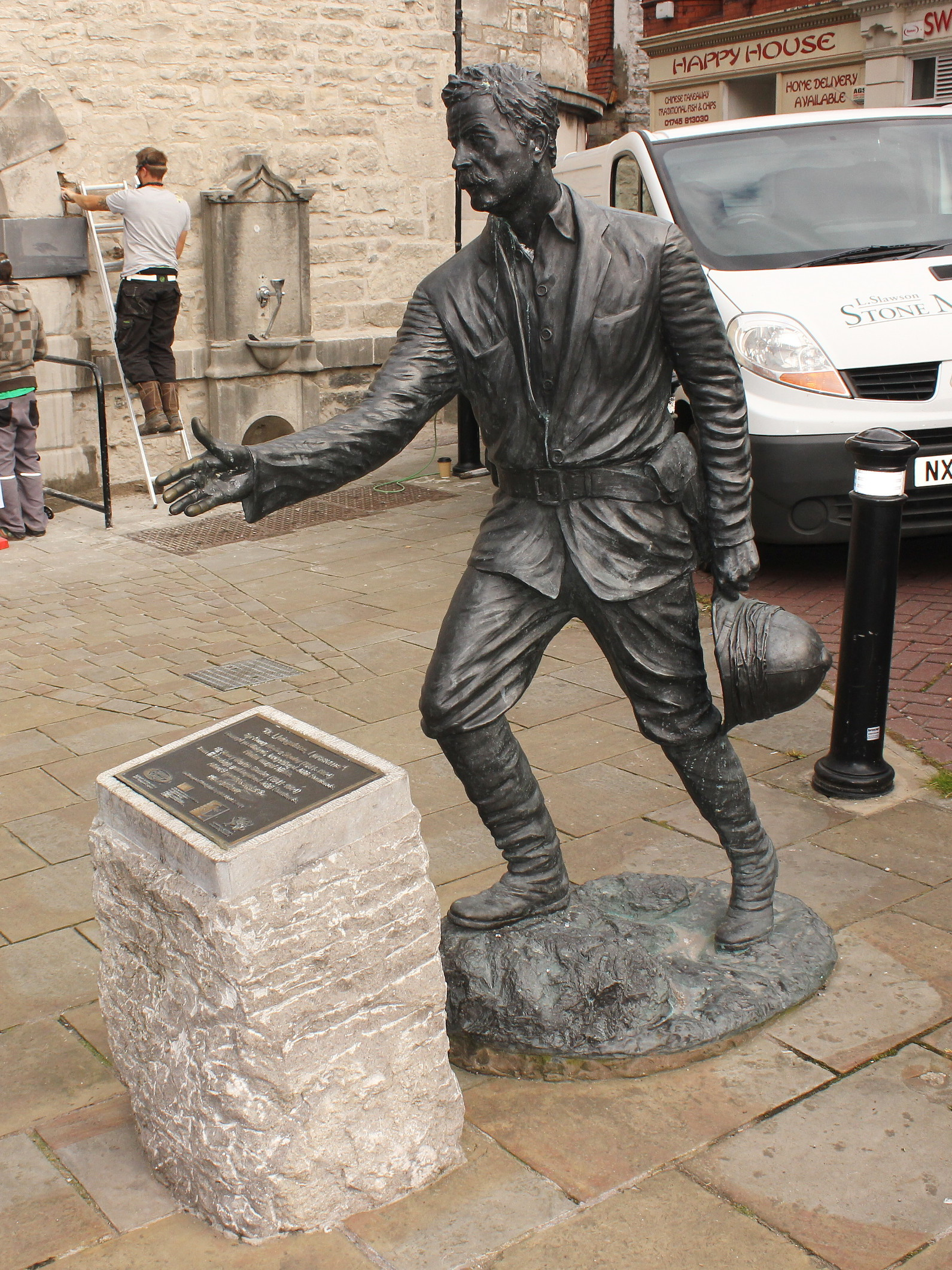
Statue of Henry Morton Stanley

His 2010 statue of Henry Morton Stanley, Dr Livingstone I Presume, stands in Hall Square, Denbigh. A 2021 public consultation and vote, arranged by Denbigh Town Council in response to a Black Lives Matter-related campaign to remove the statue, resulted in an 80-per-cent majority for retaining it.

For the Diamond Jubilee of Elizabeth II, he was commissioned to make a 5-foot (1.5 m) sculpture of her head, from which 60 casts were made. He sculpted larger-than-life Greek figures for a Garsington Opera performance of Vivaldi's L'Olimpiade, in advance of the 2012 Olympics.

In 2015 he restored the "White Rabbit Memorial" commemorating Alice in Wonderland, in Llandudno. His 2016 oversize bust of BBC drama producer and theatre founder Wilbert Lloyd Roberts is in Bangor University's Pontio centre.

He sculpted Lance Corporal Shenkin IV, a Cashmere goat mascot, and its human goat-major, for the Royal Welsh Regiment memorial, unveiled at Hightown Barracks, Wrexham, in March 2023. It was cast at The Lost Foundry in Axminster.

His bust of RAF World War II pilot Sergeant Brian Lathan has been in the collection of the RAF Manston History Museum since 2024.

His statue of Monty Python comic actor and historian Terry Jones was unveiled in Colwyn Bay in April 2026.

Elphick is a member of the Royal Cambrian Academy. He has also worked with Jean-Paul Gaultier and Damien Hirst.

=== Television ===
Elphick has featured in two episodes of the BBC series Extraordinary Portraits; in 2024, for the first episode of series 3, he sculpted trauma surgeon Martin Griffiths and in the first of series five, in 2026, he sculpted Darryn Frost, a hero of the 2019 London Bridge stabbings. He has also participated in episodes of Salvage Hunters: The Restorers.

== Personal life ==
In addition to his severe dyslexia, Elphick has also had issues with bulimia, anorexia and social anxiety, beginning in his childhood. He has been treated with antidepressants, cognitive behavioural therapy, and kinesiology therapy.

He is the subject of the 2023 film Life with Emotions, directed by Shafin Basheer, which depicts his grief following the death of his father. During that period, his bulimia worsened. He now considers himself fully recovered from his eating disorders.
