= Rizwan Javed =

British railway worker (born 1990)

Rizwan Javed MBE
- Born: 1990
- Occupation: Railway worker
- Employers: Great Western Railway (–Unknown); Transport for London
- Awards: Member of the Order of the British Empire (For services to Vulnerable People, 2023, 2024 New Year Honours); Points of Light (1700)

Rizwan Javed (born 1990) is a British railway worker, who has been commended for saving the lives of 29 people who were planning suicide.

== Career ==
Javed was born in 1990.

During induction in 2015, after being given a job with Great Western Railway, Javed underwent a Samaritans "Managing Suicidal Contacts" course on recognising and comforting people intending suicide. The next week, he identified and reassured his first potential suicide victim.

By 2023, the total number of people he had dissuaded from killing themselves had risen to at least 29. During that time, he had switched to working for MTR, on the Elizabeth line, at Ealing Broadway station, as a customer experience manager.

He also works with The Samaritans, for example promoting the "Small Talk Saves Lives" campaign.

== Recognition ==
In 2021, Javed received a Points of Light award from the Prime Minister for his actions.

He received a Samaritans Lifesaver Award in 2023, as part of the UK railway industry's RailStaff Awards.

He was appointed a Member of the Order of the British Empire (MBE) in the 2024 New Year Honours "for services to vulnerable people".

He has appeared in an episode of the Islam Channel's Living the Life and as a guest on the ITV programme This Morning. He featured in the second episode of the fourth series of the BBC TV programme Extraordinary Portraits, where his portrait was painted by Jack Dickson.
