= Mark Ormrod (Royal Marine) =

British triple amputee (born 1983)

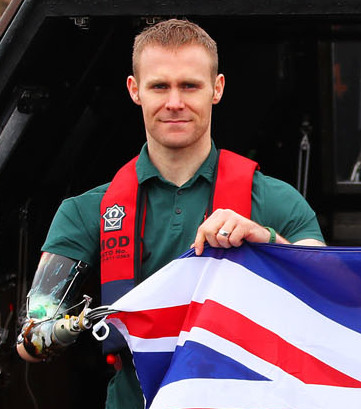
- Ormrod in 2017
- Born: 29 July 1983 (age 43)
- Spouse: Becky
- Children: 3
- Military career
- Branch: Royal Marine
- Service years: 2001–2006; 2007–2010
- Rank: Marine
- Unit: 40 Commando
- Awards: MBE
- Other work: Invictus Games athlete
- Website: www.markormrod.com

Mark Ormrod MBE (born 29 July 1983) is a former Royal Marine, Invictus Games athlete, author and motivational speaker. After triggering an improvised explosive device during a routine foot patrol in 2007, he suffered serious injuries resulting in a triple amputation. He was the UK's first triple amputee to survive the Afghanistan conflict. He has since gone on to participate in the Invictus Games.

== Military career ==
=== Royal Marine ===
Ormrod joined the Royal Marines in 2001 at the age of 17. He served in the Iraq War before leaving the Royal Marines after completing his minimum service in 2006. After working as a bodyguard, he rejoined 40 Commando in 2007. He was deployed to Afghanistan as part of Operation Herrick.

On Christmas Eve 2007 Ormrod's platoon was conducting a foot patrol in Helmand Province when Ormrod stepped on an IED, losing his left leg and his right arm in the explosion. His right foot was attached to his body by only a thick muscle. He was evacuated to Camp Bastion by the Medical Emergency Response Team (MERT) commanded by Squadron Leader Charlotte Thompson-Edgar. They were unable to insert an intravenous line into Ormrod's left arm as the vein had collapsed so they had to improvise by drilling a needle into his iliac crest, part of his pelvis. For her "great skill, courage and determination” in saving Ormrod's life, Thompson-Edgar was made an Associate of the Royal Red Cross. Ormrod was the first British service person injured in Afghanistan to survive a triple amputation.

He was then repatriated to the Royal Centre for Defence Medicine at Queen Elizabeth Hospital Birmingham. After a period of recovery at Selly Oak, Ormrod was transferred to Headley Court to begin his rehabilitation. While in rehabilitation he met Prince Harry during a visit. After initially being told he would never walk again, Ormrod walked across the Parade Ground to receive his operational medal in 2008, six months after he lost his limbs. He was medically discharged from the Royal Marines in 2010 before being employed by the Royal Marines Association.

Ormrod was one of the torchbearers during the 2012 Summer Olympics torch relay.

=== Invictus Games ===
Ormrod stated that initially he thought "disabled sports would be patronising." He eventually tried out for the Invictus Games 10 years after the explosion. After being selected for the team, Ormrod participated in the 2017 Invictus Games in Toronto where he won two silver and two bronze medals with one of the medals being presented by Prince Harry. At the closing ceremony of the Games Ormrod was awarded the Jaguar Award for Exceptional Performance, Determination and Dedication.

He reapplied for the 2018 Invictus Games where he won seven medals, four gold. He was noted for participating in the 50m breaststroke with only a few hours preparation having never swum in the event before. He participated in the event after finding out it would be cancelled due to a lack of participants. He was awarded the BBC South West Sports Personality of the year Award for 2018 for his participation in the Invictus Games.

== Other work ==
Ormrod was awarded an honorary master's degree in sports science by Plymouth Marjon University in 2018. A documentary about his life entitled NoLimits was released in 2017. It was announced in August 2020 that a film was to be made about Ormrod's life. Development of the film was slowed down by the COVID-19 pandemic.

In the Queen's Birthday Honours for 2020 Ormrod was appointed a Member of the Order of the British Empire (MBE) "for services to the Royal Marines and Veterans."

He received the Freedom of the City of Plymouth, Devon on 22 November 2021 following a vote by Plymouth City Council.

He was featured in the penultimate episode of the first series of the BBC TV programme Extraordinary Portraits, where his portrait was painted by Thomas Croft; the picture's abstract background being painted by Ormrod's children Mason and Evie.

In February 2023 he spoke at the Oxford Union during the debate 'This House Would Not Fight For King and Country', opposing the motion. Exceptionally for a debate speaker, he received a standing ovation at the conclusion of his speech.

== Personal life ==
Ormrod lives in a house in Plymouth with a garden renovated by Alan Titchmarsh with help from a number of organisations including the Royal Marines.

Ormrod is a Freemason. In 2024 he appeared on Craftcast, the official podcast of the United Grand Lodge of England to talk about his experience in the armed forces and Freemasonry.
