= Portraits for NHS Heroes =

Art project in the UK

Portraits for NHS Heroes was an art project held in the United Kingdom during the COVID-19 pandemic.

Artist Thomas Croft, at a loss as to what to paint during COVID-19 lockdown, put out an offer on Instagram on 4 April 2020, saying he would paint a free portrait for the first National Health Service (NHS) worker to reply:

I'm offering a free oil portrait to the first NHS frontline worker to DM me, I will work in lockdown from a photo you can provide me with. You get to keep the oil portrait and when the restrictions are lifted we can have an exhibition of all the portraits. Tag any artist who you think might want to participate and any NHS key workers you think deserve a portrait. #portraitsfornhsheroes 🎨💚 -

This led to him painting a portrait in oils of Manchester Royal Infirmary Accident & Emergency nurse Harriet Durkin, wearing PPE, including a 3M face mask, a Guardian visor, gloves and a gown. He gave the painting to her.

However, Croft received so many requests that he eventually put 500 NHS workers in touch with professional artists, who volunteered to paint them.

To showcase some of the artwork - including Croft's portrait of Harriet Durkin - a virtual exhibition was created in May 2020 by The Net Gallery, a London-based arts platform that uses 3D technology to turn exhibitions into virtual walkthroughs. The Net Gallery installed fine art prints by fifteen artists at Fitzrovia Chapel and then scanned the work to create a virtual walkthrough. The entire process was completed in a single day, following strict government social distancing guidelines, and was organised in support of NHS Charities Together. All the artists featured in the exhibition, including Croft, are members of the Contemporary British Portrait Painters (CBPP).

In August 2020, Croft partnered with Paintings in Hospitals and Google Arts & Culture to present Healthcare Heroes, an online exhibition of over 700 painted portraits submitted through the initiative.

A physical exhibition of many of the portraits was arranged for May 2021.

Croft published a book of the portraits in January 2021.

The idea has also been adopted in other countries, including Belgium, Ireland, the Netherlands, Spain, and the United States.

== Publication ==
- Tom Croft (12 November 2020), Portraits for NHS Heroes, Bloomsbury Publishing, OL 25259363W, Wikidata Q101499921
