= Charlotte Thompson-Edgar =

British nurse and servicewoman

Group Captain Charlotte Thompson ARRC MSc BA(Hons) MCMI Dip HE RN PMRAFNS
- Occupation: Nurse
- Employer: Princess Mary's Royal Air Force Nursing Service
- Awards: Associate of the Royal Red Cross

Group Captain Charlotte Joanne Thompson ARRC is a British nurse. She served as the United Kingdom's Officer Commanding Medical Emergency Response Teams in Afghanistan and in 2015, while holding the rank of Squadron Leader, was awarded an Associate of the Royal Red Cross (ARRC) for her services to the Princess Mary's Royal Air Force Nursing Service.

After giving emergency treatment on the battlefield to Mark Ormrod, Britain's first triple amputee in the war in Afghanistan, she argued for and was given permission to develop specialist clinical training for such extreme cases.

Thompson was featured in BBC coverage of the 2016 Royal British Legion Festival of Remembrance.
