= Sadie Lee =

British painter

- Born: 1967 (age 58–59)
- Education: Epsom School of Art Hackney Institute
- Known for: Painting
- Movement: Feminism
- Website: www.sadielee.f9.co.uk

Sadie Lee is a British painter, best known for her feminist pieces.

== Early life and education ==
Sadie Lee was born in 1967 and grew up in Yorkshire, England. She studied as a Fine Art student at the Epsom School of Art and later studied mural painting and marbling at the Hackney Institute. She moved to London in 1988.

== Work ==
Lee's painting of David Hoyle is included in Queer Britain and won the 2021 Queer Britain Madame F Award.
