= Perceval (sculpture) =

Coordinates: 25°15′37.4″N 51°26′11.0″E

Perceval, by Sarah Lucas, at Aspire Park, Doha, Qatar, 2012

Perceval is a public sculpture by British artist Sarah Lucas, a member of the Young British Artists movement. It is located in Aspire Park, Doha, Qatar. Perceval is the only piece of public art made by Lucas. It depicts a Clydesdale horse and cart, in the manner of a china ornament.

Perceval was cast at the Pangolin Editions foundry in Stroud, England.
