= Aspire Park =

Park in Doha, Qatar

Coordinates: 25.261°N 51.436°E

Aspire Park

Aspire Park is located in Aspire Zone, in the southern district of Baaya in Doha, Qatar. It covers an area of 88 hectares and it is Doha's biggest park. It is a popular place to have picnics and outdoor gatherings while overlooking the Aspire Tower. The park has different features such as fountains, playgrounds for children, and other features. It has the only lake in Qatar, a small hill, a coffee shop where different kinds of beverages can be bought, and various kinds of trees, both rare and common. Located close by is the Aspire Tower, a 300-meter modern hotel, which served as a giant torch for the 15th Asian Games. On 23 March, 2020, the Ministry of Commerce and Industry closed the park, along with other parks, due to the COVID-19 pandemic. It has been since reopened.

== Art installations ==
Perceval by British artist Sarah Lucas is a life-sized bronze sculpture of a Shire horse pulling a cart with two oversized squash installed at the Aspire Park. The subject matter reflects Lucas' fondness for re-examining everyday objects in unusual contexts.

== Gallery ==
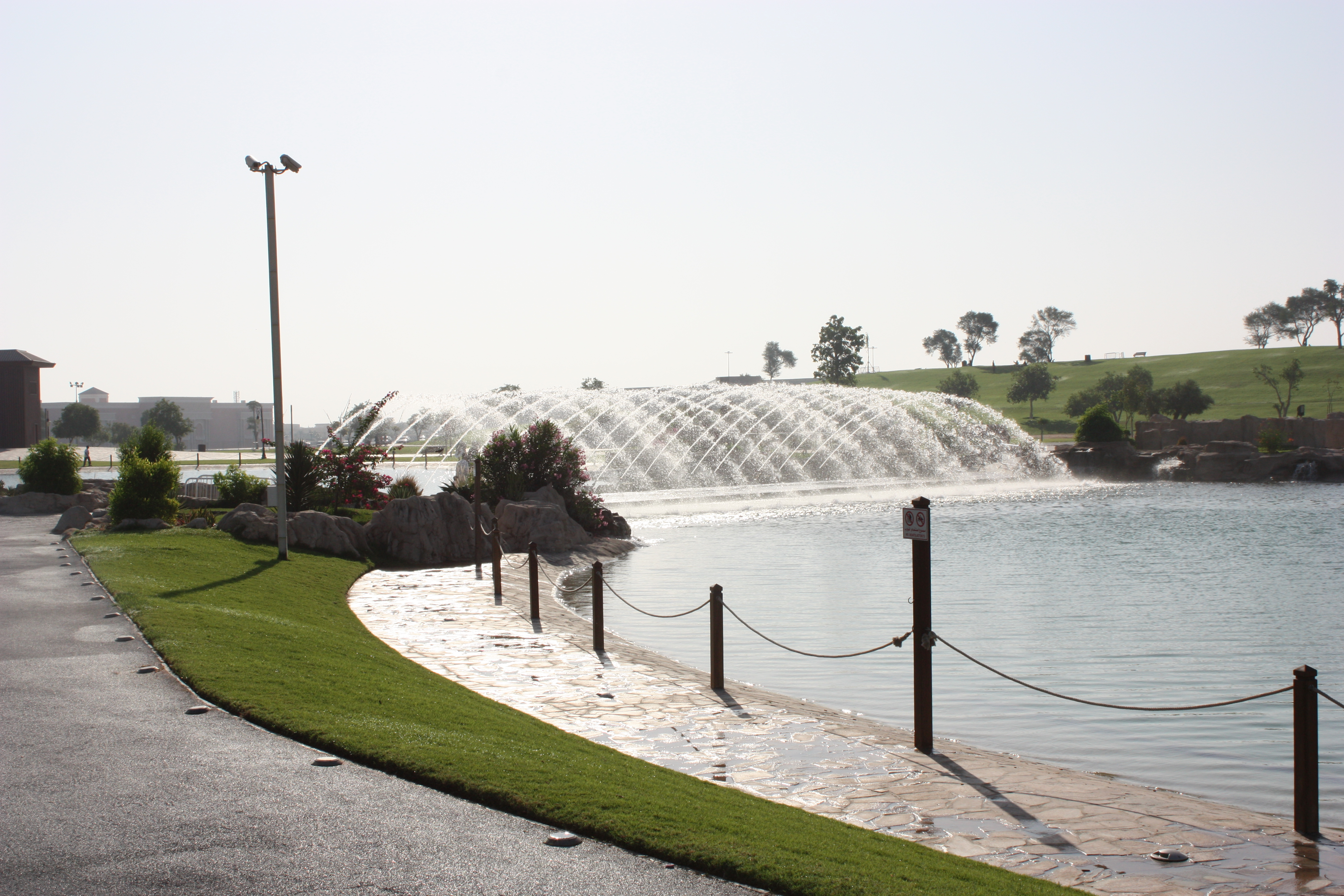
Fountain at Aspire Park.

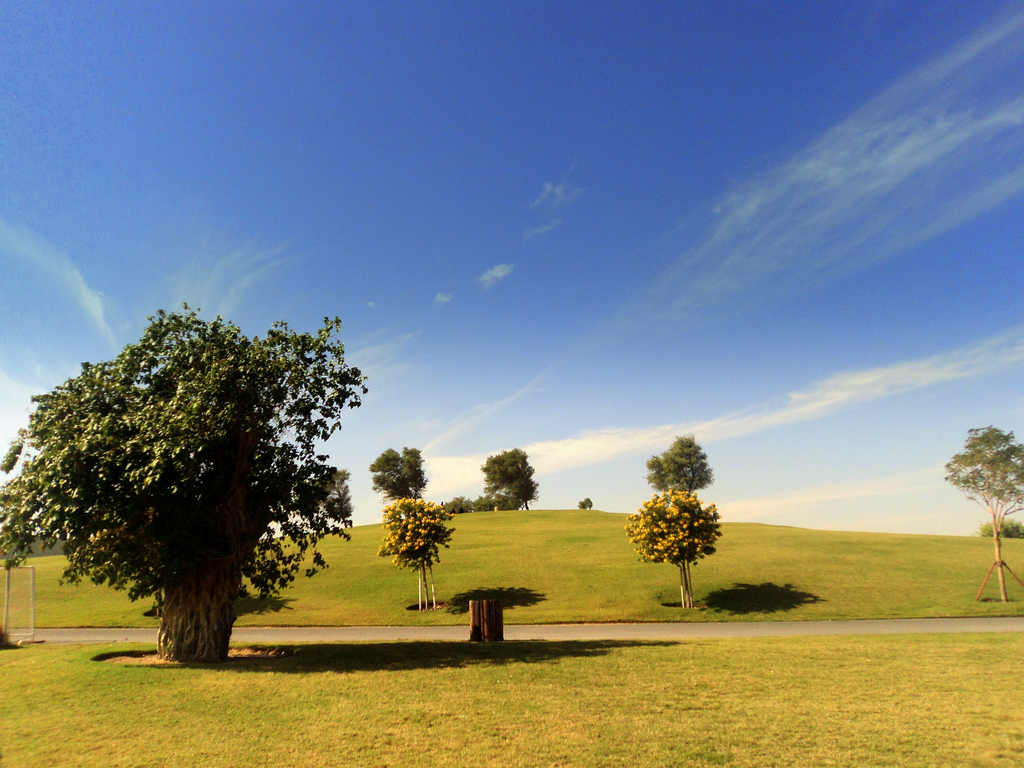
Trees in Aspire Park, with the hill as its background.

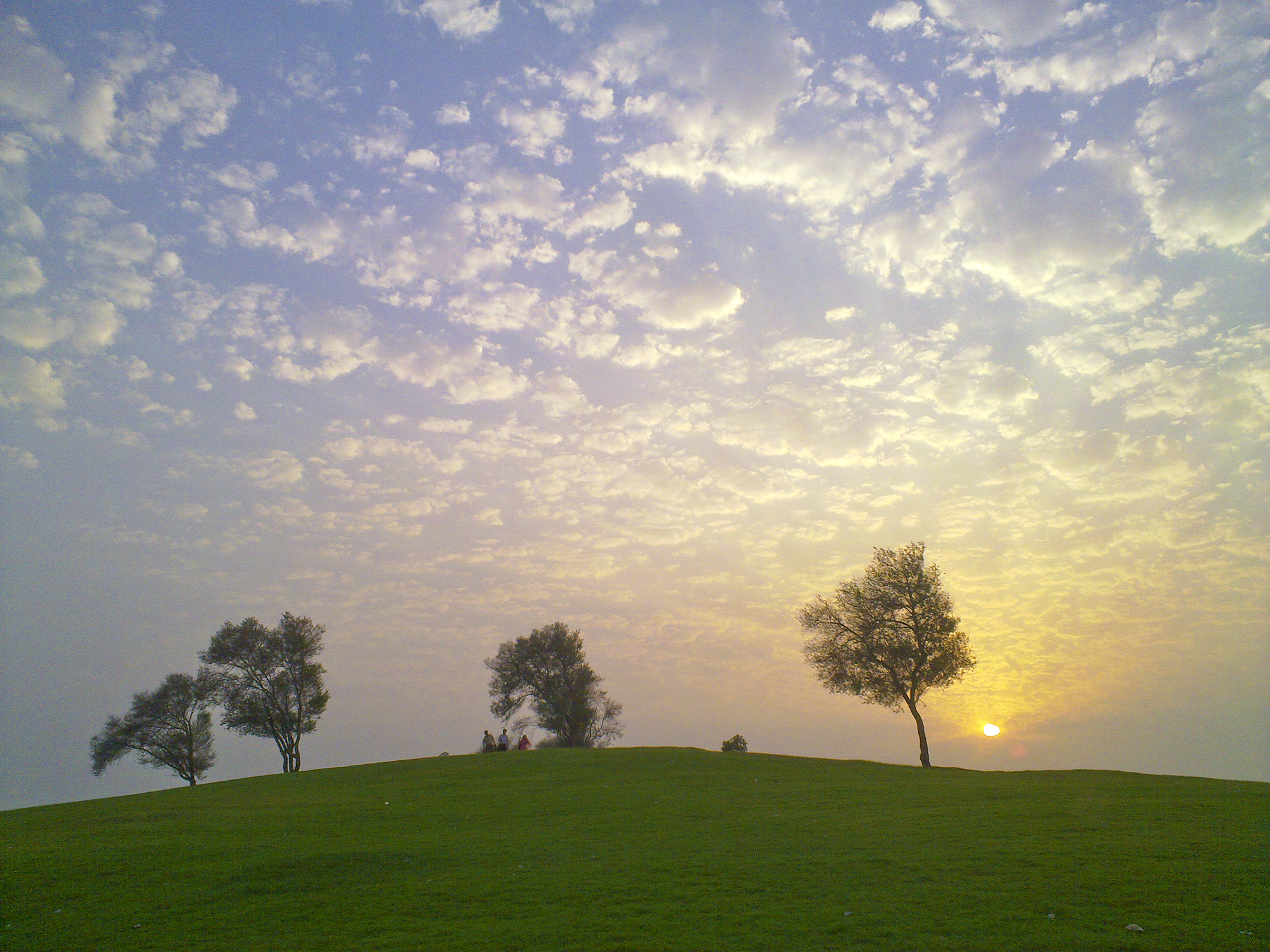
Aspire Park.
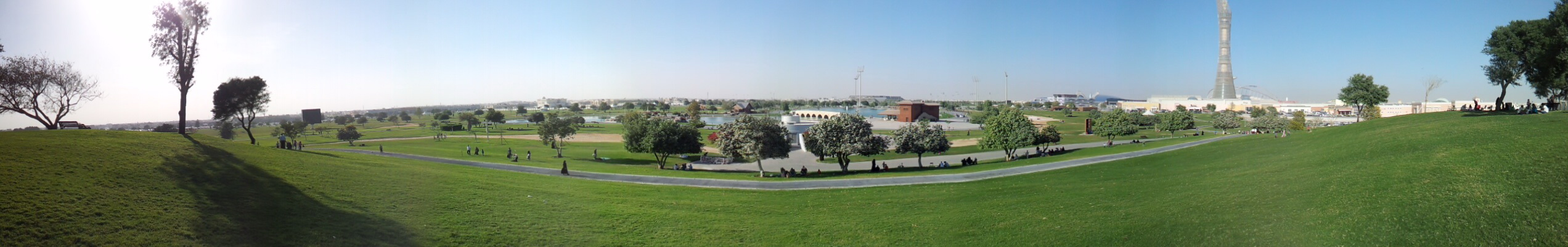
Aspire Park Panorama View.

== See also ==
- Villagio Mall
- Aspire Dome
- Aspire Academy
- Aspire lake
