= NHS Charities Together =

Federation of charities

- Formation: 2008
- Legal status: Charitable Company
- Headquarters: Lake View House, Wilton Drive, Tournament Fields, Warwick CV34 6RG
- Region served: United Kingdom
- Members: Various NHS charities
- Chief Executive: Ellie Orton
- Website: www.nhscharitiestogether.co.uk

The Association of NHS Charities, operating as NHS Charities Together, is a network of over 230 charitable organisations that support the devolved National Health Service (NHS), their staff, patients, and communities in the United Kingdom. It acts as a collective voice for NHS charities, as well as coordinating national fundraising efforts.

Charities have played an important role in supporting the NHS throughout its history. NHS Charities Together began as a membership organisation back in 2000, under the name Association of NHS Charities. Its purpose was to support members through training, advocacy and networking – helping them to have more impact.

In 2018 it changed its name to NHS Charities Together, and when Covid-19 hit in 2020, it launched the first-ever national appeal for the NHS, raising over £150 million to support staff as they faced the biggest crisis in the NHS's history.

Since then, NHS Charities Together has continued to raise money and awareness for NHS charities at a national level, whilst still fulfilling its role as a membership organisation, ensuring that funds are sent to where they are needed most. In 2026 the member organisations were raising about £620 million each year. The NHS pays about £2 billion a year for services provided by charities, but most of them say that the NHS funding does not meet the full cost of the services they provide.

In December 2020, the Duke and Duchess of Cambridge became joint patrons of the organisation.
