= Thomas Wilson =

Thomas Wilson, Tom Wilson or Tommy Wilson may refer to:

== Actors ==
- Thomas F. Wilson (born 1959), American actor most famous for his role of Biff Tannen in the Back to the Future trilogy
- Tom Wilson (actor) (1880–1965), American actor
- Dan Green (voice actor) (born 1970), American actor sometimes credited as "Tom Wilson" in films

== Businessmen ==
- Thomas Wilson (shipping magnate) (1792–1869), British shipping magnate
- Thomas Wilson, London merchant for whom Wilsons Promontory is named
- Thomas Wilson (industrialist) (fl. 1850s to early 20th century), American business magnate
- Thomas E. Wilson (1868–1958), Canadian American businessman, founder of Wilson Sporting Goods and the Wilson and Company meatpacking company
- Thomas J. Wilson (born 1958), American businessman

== Clergy ==
- Thomas Wilson (dean of Worcester) (died 1586), English Anglican priest
- Thomas Wilson (lexicographer) (1563–1622), English Anglican priest, compiler of an early biblical reference work
- Thomas Wilson (archdeacon of Cashel) (fl. 1608–1616), Irish Anglican priest
- Thomas Wilson (dean of Lismore) (fl. 1611–1622), Irish Anglican priest, also Dean of Dromore
- Thomas Wilson (dean of Carlisle) (died 1778), English Anglican priest
- Thomas Wilson (bishop) (1663–1755), English Anglican Bishop of Sodor and Man
- Thomas Wilson (schoolmaster) (1747–1813), English cleric known as master of Clitheroe grammar school
- Thomas Wilson (archdeacon of Worcester) (1882–1961), English Anglican priest
- Thomas Arnold Ikunika Wilson, Anglican bishop and scholar in Sierra Leone

== Musicians ==
- Thomas Wilson (composer) (1927–2001), Scottish composer
- Tom Wilson (DJ) (1952–2004), Scottish radio/club DJ
- Tom Wilson (musician) (born 1959), Canadian rock musician with the band Junkhouse
- Tom Wilson (record producer) (1931–1978), American record producer

== Politicians ==
- Sir Thomas Wilson (record keeper) (1560?–1629), English official and member of parliament (MP)
- Thomas Wilson (c.1767–1852), MP for the City of London, 1818–1826
- Thomas Wilson (mayor) (1787–1863), mayor of Adelaide, Australia
- Thomas Wilson (Minnesota politician) (1827–1910), U.S. representative from Minnesota
- Thomas Wilson (Pennsylvania politician) (1772–1824), U.S. representative from Pennsylvania
- Thomas Wilson (Virginia politician) (1765–1826), U.S. representative from Virginia
- Thomas Wilson (Queensland politician) (1865–1933), miner and member of the Queensland Legislative Assembly
- Thomas B. Wilson (1852–1929), New York state senator
- Thomas Fleming Wilson (1862–1929), British member of parliament for North East Lanarkshire, 1910–1911
- Thomas Spencer Wilson (1727–1798), British Army officer and member of parliament
- Thomas Stokeley Wilson (1813–1894), judge in Iowa
- T. Webber Wilson (1893–1948), U.S. representative from Mississippi
- Thomas Woodrow Wilson (1856–1924), 28th president of the United States (used his first name until he was a student at Princeton)
- Tom Wilson (lobbyist) (born 1967), chairman of the New Jersey Republican State Committee

== Sportsmen ==
=== Association football ===
- Tom Wilson (footballer, born 1896) (1896–1948), England and Huddersfield Town footballer
- Tom Wilson (footballer, born 1902) (1902–1992), English footballer
- Tom Wilson (footballer, born 1930) (1930–2010), English footballer
- Tom Wilson (footballer, born 1940), Scottish footballer at Falkirk, Millwall and Hull City
- Tommy Wilson (footballer, born 1877) (1877–1940), English footballer
- Tommy Wilson (footballer, born 1930) (1930–1992), Nottingham Forest and Walsall footballer
- Tommy Wilson (footballer, born 1961), head coach of Scotland U-19 national team, as of 2006
- Tug Wilson (footballer) (Thomas Harold Wilson, 1917–1959), Gillingham F.C. player of the 1930s and 1940s

=== American football ===
- Tom Wilson (American football) (1944–2016), Texas A&M University head football coach
- Tommy Wilson (American football) (1932–2006), National Football League running back

=== Baseball ===
- Tom Wilson (1910s catcher) (1890–1953), Major League Baseball catcher
- Tom Wilson (2000s catcher) (born 1970), Major League Baseball catcher
- Tommy Wilson (shortstop) (fl. 1940s), American baseball player

=== Basketball ===
- Bubba Wilson (Thomas Eugene Wilson, born 1955), American professional basketball player
- Tom Wilson (basketball) (born 1997), Australian basketball player and footballer

=== Cricket ===
- Thomas Wilson (cricketer, born 1841) (1841–1929), English cricketer
- Thomas Wilson (cricketer, born 1849) (1849–1924), English cricketer
- Thomas Wilson (New Zealand cricketer) (1869–1918)
- Thomas Wilson (Middlesex cricketer) (fl. 1880s), English cricketer
- Thomas Wilson (cricketer, born 1936) (1936–2022), English cricketer
- Tommy Wilson (umpire) (1937–2023), English cricket umpire

=== Other sports ===
- Thomas Wilson (equestrian) (born 1962), Puerto Rican Olympic equestrian
- Thomas Wilson (pickleball) (born 1990), American professional pickleball player
- Tom Wilson (Australian footballer) (born 1992), Australian rules football player and coach
- Tom Wilson (curler), Canadian curler
- Tom Wilson (ice hockey) (born 1994), Canadian ice hockey player
- Tommy Wilson (gymnast) (born 1953), British Olympic gymnast
- Tom Wilson (rower) (born 1992), British rower and Gladiator

== Others ==
- Thomas Wilson (academic) (1726–1799), Irish academic and clergyman
- Thomas Wilson (economist) (1916–2001), British economist
- Thomas Wilson (rhetorician) (1524–1581), English diplomat, judge, and privy councillor
- Thomas Wilson (philanthropist) (1764–1843), English Congregationalist benefactor
- Thomas Wilson (poet) (1773–1858), Tyneside poet, writer of The Pitman's Pay
- Thomas Braidwood Wilson (1792–1843), Scottish explorer, medical practitioner and settler after whom Wilson Inlet in Western Australia is named
- Thomas Bellerby Wilson (1807–1865), American naturalist
- A. T. M. Wilson (1906–1978), known as Tommy, British psychiatrist
- Thomas Wilson (shipwreck), American whaleback freighter wrecked in Lake Superior in 1902
- Tom Wilson, one of the people behind the Martian Monkey hoax
- Tom Wilson (cartoonist) (1931–2011), US cartoonist whose most famous creation was the cartoon Ziggy
- Thomas D. Wilson (born 1935), information scientist researching information-seeking behaviors
- Thomas Edmonds Wilson (1859–1933), Canadian outfitter and guide
- Thomas R. Wilson (born 1946), director of the Defense Intelligence Agency
- Tom Wilson (filmmaker) (born 1980), British filmmaker based in Romania
- Thomas Wilson, fictional US president in the 2009 film 2012
- Tom Read Wilson (born 1986), TV personality
- Thomas George Wilson (1876–1958), Australian obstetrician and gynaecologist
- T. G. Wilson (Thomas George Wilson, 1901–1969), Anglo-Irish surgeon
- Sir Thomas Maryon Wilson, 8th Baronet (1800–1869)
- Thomas Needham Furnival Wilson (1896−1961), British Army officer

== See also ==
- Thomas Willson (1860–1915), Canadian inventor and industrialist
