= Gladiators (2024 British TV series) series 3 =

Gladiators
- Series 3
- Starring: Bradley Walsh; Barney Walsh; Mark Clattenburg; Sonia Mkoloma; Lee Phillips; Guy Mowbray
- No. of episodes: 12 (including Celebrity special)

Release
- Original network: BBC One
- Original release: 25 December 2025 (Celebrity special)
- Original release: 17 January – 28 March 2026

Series chronology
- ← Previous; Series 2

The third series of Gladiators began airing in the UK from 17 January 2026 on BBC One. It was recorded in the summer of 2025 at the Sheffield Arena.

The third series was announced by the BBC after the growing attention and the success of the second series in 2025. It is once again being hosted by Bradley and Barney Walsh, and being refereed by Mark Clattenburg with the assistance of Sonia Mkoloma and Lee Phillips.

Another celebrity special episode with four new celebrity contenders was also announced. Joe Wicks, Sam Thompson, Vogue Williams and Nicola Adams were announced as the new celebrity lineup. The special once again preceded the run of the main series, but was this time aired on Christmas Day.

In January 2026, following his divorce, male gladiator Giant reverted his last name to his birth name, Bigg. However, as the series was filmed in the summer of 2025, he is still listed here as Jamie Christian-Johal, using his previous double-barrel surname.

When airing of the episodes began, it was quickly announced that the programme had started casting contenders for a further, fourth series.

== Gladiators ==
All of the 18 Gladiators from across the previous two series were set to return this series. Nitro returned from his hiatus on Series 2 after suffering an knee injury before the filming of the series, as did Giant, who was only seen briefly in the previous series due to a bicep injury.

Males			Females		
Gladiator name	Real name	Stats	Gladiator name	Real name	Stats
Apollo	Alex Gray	6 ft 6 in, 249 lb (1.98 m, 113 kg)	Athena (Note: Was featured sparsely due to a leg injury discovered during the tapings.)	Karenjeet Bains	5 ft 4 in, 148 lb (1.63 m, 67 kg)
Bionic (Note: Suffered a major injury in Hang Tough forcing him out of the series due to being put into medical care.)	Matty Campbell	6 ft 6 in, 260 lb (1.98 m, 120 kg)	Comet	Ella-Mae Rayner	5 ft 8 in, 146 lb (1.73 m, 66 kg)
Giant	Jamie Bigg (Note: Credited as Jamie Christian-Johal, per previous two-part surname)	6 ft 5 in, 280 lb (1.96 m, 130 kg)	Cyclone	Lystus Ebosele	5 ft 10 in, 209 lb (1.78 m, 95 kg)
Hammer	Tom Wilson	6 ft 6 in, 257 lb (1.98 m, 117 kg)	Diamond (Note: Suffered an leg injury in Powerball forcing her to withdraw from the series early on.)	Liv Sheldon	6 ft 0 in, 176 lb (1.83 m, 80 kg)
Legend (Note: Misses most of the series' events due to bicep injury from competing but is still seen in the programme via different skits, including becoming a guest referee in Heat 5.)	Matt Morsia	6 ft 1 in, 212 lb (1.85 m, 96 kg)	Dynamite	Emily Steel	5 ft 5 in, 141 lb (1.65 m, 64 kg)
Nitro	Harry Aikines-Aryeetey	5 ft 11 in, 187 lb (1.80 m, 85 kg)	Electro	Jade Packer	5 ft 8 in, 154 lb (1.73 m, 70 kg)
Phantom	Toby Olubi	6 ft 5 in, 247 lb (1.96 m, 112 kg)	Fire	Montell Douglas	5 ft 10 in, 148 lb (1.78 m, 67 kg)
Steel	Zack George	6 ft 0 in, 222 lb (1.83 m, 101 kg)	Fury	Jodie Ounsley	5 ft 7 in, 163 lb (1.70 m, 74 kg)
Viper	Quang Luong	6 ft 0 in, 200 lb (1.83 m, 90 kg)	Sabre	Sheli McCoy	5 ft 7 in, 154 lb (1.70 m, 70 kg)

== Contenders ==
The winning contenders are marked in bold. As the series contains only five heats, and three quarter finals, in addition to the winners of the previous episodes, winners of unaired head-to-head versions of Duel between the two fastest runners-up advance to the next stage in the heats and the fastest losers in the quarters. (Marked with WC)

Episodes	Male Contenders		Female Contenders	
Celebrity Special	**Joe Wicks**	Sam Thompson	Nicola Adams	**Vogue Williams**
Heat 1	**Finn Hutton**	Josh McDonald	Rachael Phillips	**Naomi Church**
Heat 2	**Mark Billings**	Jason Melrose	Gail Woodburn	**Emily Bell**
Heat 3	Elliot Barton	**Tyler Spence**	**Ellie Lederer**	Millie Margetts (WC)
Heat 4	Shaun Stephen (WC) (Note: Contender Shaun revealed that his father, Murray Stephen, was a contender who made it to the semi-finals of the original programme in 1995.)	**Hinley Chan**	**Ella Donnelly**	Ciara Scullion
Heat 5	**Mo Robertson**	Sid Islam	**Helena Moss**	Nikki Hufano
Quarter Final 1	Mark Billings/**Josh McDonald** (Note: Contender Mark got injured in Crash Course and had to withdraw, giving earlier contender Josh a new chance. Josh was one of the two fastest losers in the heats.)	Tyler Spence	Ellie Lederer	**Naomi Church**
Quarter Final 2	Mo Robertson (WC)	**Shaun Stephen**	Helena Moss	**Millie Margetts**
Quarter Final 3	**Finn Hutton**	Hinley Chan	**Ella Donnelly**	Emily Bell (WC)
Semi Final 1	Mo Robertson/**Tyler Spence** (Note: Contender Mo got injured in Everest and had to withdraw, giving earlier contender Tyler a new chance. Tyler was the second fastest loser in the quarter finals.)	Finn Hutton	Ella Donnelly	**Naomi Church**
Semi Final 2	Shaun Stephen	**Josh McDonald**	Millie Margetts	**Emily Bell**
Grand Final	Tyler Spence	**Josh McDonald**	Naomi Church	**Emily Bell**
Winners	Josh McDonald		Emily Bell	

== Events ==
In addition to the events from the previous series (Duel, Gauntlet, Hang Tough, Collision, Powerball, The Wall, The Edge, Unleash, Atlaspheres, Crash Course and The Eliminator), several brand new and returning classic events are introduced on the third series.

- Destruction is one of the new games in this series. In this event, two contenders are facing one Gladiator, in a race to press the button at the center of the arena. To get to the button, they have to break through four 8 ft tall barriers, each one requiring a different technique. The first is a straight run through, the second requires use of a battering ram, the third has marked crosses that must be kicked or punched to create hand/foot holds to climb over, and the fourth must be got through via brute force with repeated barges and attacks. 10 points are awarded for a win, 5 for coming second. If the gladiator comes first, 5 points are given to the first contender to strike the button.
- Everest is the second of the brand new games of the series. In a game of pushing power on an elevated platform 21 ft above the arena floor, the contender and the Gladiator must push a 220kg solid perspex wall the length of the platform so that the opponent will fall off the due to lack of space. At a certain point a siren will sound meaning the platform will tilt, firstly in the contender's favour and then in the Gladiator's. 10 points are gained for pushing the Gladiator off.
- Suspension Bridge makes its return from the original series. A variant of Duel, contenders and gladiators fight on an unstable suspension bridge, and the contenders must reach the Gladiator's platform on the opposite side of the bridge to win. As in the original version, combatants fight using the hammerhead weapons. 10 points are awarded if the contenders reaches the Gladiator's platform, 5 points for a draw or if the Gladiator breaks the rules.

In a change to previous series, a head-to-head version of Duel between the two fastest runner-ups in the heats was used to determine which contenders would receive the final spot in the quarter-finals; however, there were no clear winners due to none of the contenders falling in either the male or female bouts so the head referee made the final decision based on performance; this was not mentioned or aired in the programme.

For this series, the balance beam obstacle of the Eliminator has been modified so instead of a level run it dips in the middle. Any red section on the beam must be touched or the contender will have to start again. For the grand final, the timings for Unleash and Gauntlet were reduced by one second and five seconds respectively.

== Episodes ==
Note, that some of the episodes are shown in a different order from that which they were filmed in.

No. overall	No. in series	Title	BBC One airdate	UK viewers (millions)	Weekly Rank
–	–	"Christmas Celebrity Special"	25 December 2025	4.29	17th
Competing in the Christmas season's Celebrity Special edition are fitness coach Joe Wicks, TV personality Sam Thompson, presenter and media personality Vogue Williams and former Olympic boxer Nicola Adams. Male Gladiators Giant and Nitro made returns in Duel and The Wall respectively, the latter being missed entirely in the previous series and the former after the fifth episode due to injuries. Legend, Diamond and Athena did not compete in this special. Event 1: Duel Male contenders Joe Wicks vs. Viper (5–0) (5–0) Sam Thompson vs. Giant Though Viper dispatched Joe off the podium, he actually went just before the starting whistle. Beecause of that, Viper was disqualified for this and Joe was rewarded with 5 points. Female contenders Nicola Adams vs. Fury (0–0) (0–0) Vogue Williams vs. Sabre Nicola forfeited the event after falling onto Fury's podium. After the event, Fury revealed that Nicola was her childhood sporting hero. Event 2: Collision Male contenders Joe Wicks vs. Phantom, Apollo, Bionic & Steel (6–4) (11–4) Sam Thompson vs. Phantom, Apollo, Bionic & Steel Following the men's event, Joe and Sam got into trouble with Giant and Phantom after messing around in the locker room. Female contenders Nicola Adams vs. Sabre, Electro, Fire & Comet (10–6) (10–6) Vogue Williams vs. Sabre, Electro, Fire & Comet Event 3: The Wall Male contenders Joe Wicks vs. Nitro (0–10) (11–14) Sam Thompson vs. Hammer Nitro's return event and Hammer's Wall-debut. Female contenders Nicola Adams vs. Dynamite (0–0) (10–6) Vogue Williams vs. Cyclone Cyclone's debut on The Wall. Event 4: Gauntlet Male contenders Joe Wicks vs. Nitro, Steel, Phantom, Bionic & Apollo (10–8) (21–22) Sam Thompson vs. Nitro, Steel, Phantom, Bionic & Apollo Though Sam crossed the finish line just as time ran out, he wasn't fully over the line and therefore only scored 8 points. Female contenders Nicola Adams vs. Comet, Electro, Dynamite, Fury & Cyclone (10–10) (20–16) Vogue Williams vs. Comet, Electro, Dynamite, Fury & Cyclone Comet's first shown outing on this event. Event 5: The Eliminator Male contenders: Joe Wicks / Sam Thompson; Entering the Eliminator, the score was 21–22. This 1-point lead gave Sam a 0.5-second head-start. Winner; Joe Wicks Female contenders: Nicola Adams / Vogue Williams; Entering the Eliminator, the score was 20–16. This 4-point lead gave Nicola a 2-second head-start. Winner; Vogue Williams
23	1	"Heat 1"	17 January 2026	5.14	6th
The heats begin. Gladiators Legend, Athena and Diamond are back, and a brand new event, Destruction, debuts. Contenders for the episode are Finn, Josh, Rachael and Naomi. A new stats comparing feature was brought to compare the 6 ft 4 in tall contender Finn and the 6 ft 5 in gladiator Giant side-by-side before their Duel game. Event 1: Powerball Male contenders Finn vs. Phantom, Steel, Hammer (7–6) (7–6) Josh vs. Phantom, Steel, Hammer The game was briefly stopped after Hammer almost tore Finn's shirt off midway through. Finn's first ball, though scored while the pod was on its side, was also deemed legal. Female contenders Rachael vs. Electro, Sabre, Fury (0–8) (0–8) Naomi vs. Electro, Sabre, Fury The commentator claimed Naomi's last ball, which would have scored her 10 points, was deemed invalid because it had touched the ground before being put in a pod. Event 2: Duel Male contenders Finn vs. Giant (10–10) (17–16) Josh vs. Viper Giant's first ever proper defeat in Duel. Upon being defeated by Josh after accidentally stepping onto Josh's podium before falling off, Viper threw a tantrum, damaging the podium with the pugil stick, and therefore was sent off the arena by the referees. Female contenders Rachael vs. Fire (5–0) (5–8) Naomi vs. Diamond Event 3: Destruction Male contenders Finn vs. Bionic (5–0) (22–16) Josh vs. Bionic In an all-new event, the two contenders face just ONE Gladiator simultaneously. Female contenders Rachael vs. Cyclone (0–5) (5–13) Naomi vs. Cyclone Event 4: The Edge Male contenders Finn vs. Apollo (4–10) (26–26) Josh vs. Legend Legend's first shown outing since Series 2. Although shown and mentioned in the "Heat 4" episode of the program, and as the episodes are aired in a different order than they're produced, Legend suffered a major bicep muscle tear, when competing on The Edge against contender Josh. Since this is his last played event during the filmings, every other event he's competed after this (including The Wall in "Heat 1") have been filmed pre-injury. Female contenders Rachael vs. Dynamite (10–10) (15–23) Naomi vs. Fury Event 5: The Wall Male contenders Finn vs. Legend (10–0) (36–26) Josh vs. Nitro Nitro returns in regular series, remains victorious with 6 total wins on The Wall across the entire regular show. Female contenders Rachael vs. Athena (10–5) (25–28) Naomi vs. Comet Event 6: The Eliminator Male contenders: Finn / Josh; Entering the Eliminator the score was 36–26. This 10-point lead gave Finn a 5-second head-start. Winner; Finn Female contenders: Rachael / Naomi; Entering the Eliminator the score was 25–28. This 3 point lead gave Naomi a 1.5-second head-start. Winner; Naomi
24	2	"Heat 2"	24 January 2026	4.74	9th
In this heat, another brand-new event called Everest debuts. Contenders are Mark, Jason, Gail and Emily. Gladiators Legend, Diamond and Fire did not compete in this episode, although Legend provided a backstage skit suggesting he replace all the Gladiators. Event 1: Duel Male contenders Mark vs. Phantom (0–0) (0–0) Jason vs. Nitro Jason forfeited the event after stepping onto Nitro's podium. Female contenders Gail vs. Fury (0–5) (0–5) Emily vs. Cyclone During her duel with Emily, Cyclone was repeatedly warned by Mark Clattenburg for using her pugil stick to push Emily. Event 2: Destruction Male contenders Mark vs. Steel (10–0) (10–0) Jason vs. Steel Female contenders Gail vs. Sabre (10–0) (10–5) Emily vs. Sabre Event 3: Collision Male contenders Mark vs. Viper, Apollo, Hammer & Nitro (6–2) (16–2) Jason vs. Viper, Apollo, Hammer & Nitro Nitro's debut on Collision. Female contenders Gail vs. Athena, Comet, Electro & Dynamite (0–2) (10–7) Emily vs. Athena, Comet, Electro & Dynamite Event 4: Everest Male contenders Mark vs. Giant (10–10) (26–12) Jason vs. Bionic Female contenders Gail vs. Cyclone (0–10) (10–17) Emily vs. Dynamite Event 5: The Edge Male contenders Mark vs. Apollo (2–10) (28–22) Jason vs. Steel Female contenders Gail vs. Fury (6–10) (16–27) Emily vs. Dynamite Event 6: The Eliminator Male contenders: Mark / Jason; Entering the Eliminator the score was 28–22. This 6-point lead gave Mark a 3-second head-start Winner; Mark Female contenders: Gail / Emily; Entering the Eliminator the score was 16–27. This 11-point lead gave Emily a 5.5-second head-start Winner; Emily
25	3	"Heat 3"	31 January 2026	4.75	6th
This heat sees the return of events Unleash and Hang Tough. Contenders for the episode are Elliot & Tyler, Ellie & Millie. This episode sees the return of gladiators Diamond, Legend and Fire, who were absent from events in the previous episode. Event 1: Duel Male contenders Elliot vs. Hammer (5–0) (5–0) Tyler vs. Nitro Hammer got disqualified for going before the whistle so therefore Elliot got 5 points. Female contenders Ellie vs. Sabre (5–0) (5–0) Millie vs. Cyclone Event 2: Unleash Male contenders Elliot vs. Apollo (0–5) (5–5) Tyler vs. Phantom Female contenders Ellie vs. Electro (5–10) (10–10) Millie vs. Diamond Diamond's Unleash debut. Event 3: Destruction Male contenders Elliot vs. Giant (0–10) (5–15) Tyler vs. Giant Female contenders Ellie vs. Fire (0–5) (10–15) Millie vs. Fire Event 4: Hang Tough Male contenders Elliot vs. Steel (0–0) (5–15) Tyler vs. Legend Steel's Hang Tough debut. After knocking Tyler off the rings, Legend was warned by Mark Clattenburg for deliberately tackling high with his feet. Female contenders Ellie vs. Fury (0–10) (10–25) Millie vs. Athena Event 5: Gauntlet Male contenders Elliot vs. Viper, Phantom, Legend, Apollo & Bionic (10–10) (15–25) Tyler vs. Viper, Phantom, Legend, Apollo & Bionic Female contenders Ellie vs. Diamond, Fury, Comet, Dynamite & Cyclone (10–8) (20–33) Millie vs. Diamond, Fury, Comet, Dynamite & Cyclone Millie's Gauntlet run was stopped briefly when she and Fury inadvertently grappled with each other. Event 6: The Eliminator Male contenders: Elliot / Tyler; Entering the Eliminator the score was 15–25. This 10-point lead gave Tyler a 5-second head-start Winner; Tyler Female contenders: Ellie / Millie; Entering the Eliminator the score was 20–33. This 13-point lead gave Millie a 6.5-second head-start Winner; Ellie
26	4	"Heat 4"	7 February 2026	4.74	6th
This heat includes events like Everest and Hang Tough. Contenders are Shaun and Hinley, Ella and Ciara. During the episode, injured Gladiator Legend was seen walking in, announcing his accident, and he did a skit for The Wall event, writing the hosts' teleprompter. Purvinder Kaur Shokar is credited as an assistant referee for the first time. Event 1: Collision Male contenders Shaun vs. Phantom, Hammer, Bionic & Giant (6–4) (6–4) Hinley vs. Phantom, Hammer, Bionic & Giant Female contenders Ella vs. Sabre, Fire, Athena & Electro (12–2) (12–2) Ciara vs. Sabre, Fire, Athena & Electro Ella scored the highest score on Collision so far, by 12 points. Event 2: Everest Male contenders Shaun vs. Hammer (0–10) (6–14) Hinley vs. Viper Viper was warned by referee Mark for holding to the railings of the Everest platform. After the event Viper ripped Dynamite's toy panda in the locker room which he hates cuddly toys. Female contenders Ella vs. Cyclone (0–10) (12–12) Ciara vs. Diamond Event 3: Hang Tough Male contenders Shaun vs. Steel (5–0) (11–14) Hinley vs. Nitro Female contenders Ella vs. Fury (5–5) (17–17) Ciara vs. Dynamite Event 4: Powerball Male contenders Shaun vs. Bionic, Steel & Apollo (2–0) (13–14) Hinley vs. Bionic, Steel & Apollo Female contenders Ella vs. Fire, Dynamite & Diamond (7–2) (24–19) Ciara vs. Fire, Dynamite & Diamond The event was ended prematurely after a tackle resulted in Diamond injuring her right knee. Both contenders claimed the points they had earned up to that point. Event 5: The Wall Male contenders Shaun vs. Nitro (5–10) (18–24) Hinley vs. Apollo After this event Nitro pulled Shaun's sock which Bradley later used it to prank Apollo who chased him throughout the arena. Female contenders Ella vs. Sabre (10–5) (34–24) Ciara vs. Comet Event 6: The Eliminator Male contenders: Shaun / Hinley; Entering the Eliminator, the score was 18–24. This 6-point lead gave Hinley a 3-second head-start. Winner; Hinley Female contenders: Ella / Ciara; Entering the Eliminator, the score was 34–24. This 10-point lead gave Ella a 5-second head-start. Despite the male contenders going first in all the events prior, the female contenders went first in the Eliminator. Winner; Ella
27	5	"Heat 5"	14 February 2026	3.56	15th
Events for the final heats include Duel and returning Crash Course. Final set of contenders are Mo & Sid, Helena & Nikki. During the episode, injured Gladiator Legend was seen walking in, becoming an assistant referee; Lee Phillips did not feature in this episode and was replaced by a male assistant referee but had the name 'Purvinder Kaur Shokar' in the credits. This episode was made available on iPlayer from 4pm due to live FA Cup football, hence it getting lower 7-day viewer ratings than usual. Event 1: The Wall Male contenders Mo vs. Apollo (0–0) (0–0) Sid vs. Viper Legend appeared instead of Viper but the referee did not allow Legend to climb with his sling but Viper did compete. During the post interview, Viper called Apollo "ugly" and subsequently called himself a "SEXY BEAST!" Female contenders Helena vs. Comet (10–0) (10–0) Nikki vs. Sabre Event 2: Unleash Male contenders Mo vs. Hammer (0–0) (0–0) Sid vs. Nitro Nitro's Unleash debut. Sid completed the challenge incorrectly by not climbing up the stairs one step at a time. He was therefore disqualified and got no points. Female contenders Helena vs. Fury (0–0) (10–0) Nikki vs. Fire Event 3: Crash Course Male contenders Mo vs. Giant & Phantom (5–10) (5–10) Sid vs. Giant & Phantom Mo was originally not awarded any points but Phantom failed to release the contender against the barrier for three seconds so Mo was awarded 5 points. Female contenders Helena vs. Fury & Cyclone (0–10) (10–10) Nikki vs. Fury & Cyclone Event 4: Duel Male contenders Mo vs. Bionic (0–0) (5–10) Sid vs. Apollo Female contenders Helena vs. Electro (0–0) (10–10) Nikki vs. Comet Electro's Duel debut. Three duels ended up with contenders being disqualified after their pugil sticks made contact with the Gladiator's platforms. The only one who lost by falling off was Sid. Event 5: Gauntlet Male contenders Mo vs. Hammer, Steel, Bionic, Phantom & Giant (10–6) (15–16) Sid vs. Hammer, Steel, Bionic, Phantom & Giant Legend interrupted the countdown before Mo started his attempt. During Sid's run, Phantom's release before the time ran out was deemed legal. Female contenders Helena vs. Athena, Dynamite, Sabre, Electro & Cyclone (6–10) (16–20) Nikki vs. Athena, Dynamite, Sabre, Electro & Cyclone Athena's final appearance during the series, before discovering an ACL tear. During Nikki's run, Cyclone used her arm to hold Nikki and was disqualified, allowing the contender to complete the final zone unopposed. Event 6: The Eliminator Male contenders: Mo / Sid; Entering the Eliminator, the score was 15–16. This 1-point lead gave Sid a 0.5-second head-start. Sid stopped as Mo started his run. Also, Sid's attempt was mostly done with one shoe. Winner; Mo Female contenders: Helena / Nikki; Entering the Eliminator, the score was 16–20. This 4-point lead gave Nikki a 2-second head-start. Nikki fell off the course twice and needed assistance with a ladder before tackling the red overhead ladders. Winner; Helena
28	6	"Quarter Final 1"	21 February 2026	3.16	34th
Marking the start of the quarter finals, classical event Suspension Bridge returns. Returning contenders from the heats are Mark & Tyler, Ellie & Naomi. The episode was made available on iPlayer from 6am due to a live Six Nations rugby union match. Gladiators Bionic and Fury were not seen competing in this episode, and injured Legend did a skit on top of The Wall. Sonia Mkoloma did not referee Collision or Suspension Bridge and was replaced for these events by the same male referee who appeared in the fifth heat but was uncredited. Lee Phillips was the sole assistant referee for the Eliminator. Event 1: Collision Male contenders Mark vs. Giant, Phantom, Apollo & Steel (10–2) (10–2) Tyler vs. Giant, Phantom, Apollo & Steel Female contenders Ellie vs. Comet, Electro, Dynamite & Cyclone (2–4) (2–4) Naomi vs. Comet, Electro, Dynamite & Cyclone Cyclone's Collision debut. Event 2: Suspension Bridge Male contenders Mark vs. Hammer (0–0) (10–2) Tyler vs. Nitro Female contenders Ellie vs. Fire (0–0) (2–4) Naomi vs. Sabre Naomi and Sabre fell off the bridge at the same time, but as Naomi was the first to touch the ground, Sabre was declared victorious. Event 3: Crash Course Male contenders Mark vs. Apollo & Giant (5–10) (15–12) Tyler vs. Apollo & Giant Following this event, it was revealed that Mark tore his hamstring whilst trying to turn the Atlasphere on the final bend and ran against the direction of the spin. Following the women's event, it was revealed he was forced to withdraw and Josh was reinstated in his place for the remainder of the competition. Likely due to this, the male contenders were shown going first in both this event and Destruction. Female contenders Ellie vs. Electro & Comet (0–10) (2–14) Naomi vs. Electro & Comet Electro's debut inside an Atlasphere in Crash Course. Event 4: Destruction Male contenders Josh vs. Nitro (0–10) (15–22) Tyler vs. Nitro Female contenders Ellie vs. Sabre (5–0) (7–14) Naomi vs. Sabre Event 5: The Wall Male contenders Josh vs. Hammer (5–10) (20–32) Tyler vs. Viper Female contenders Ellie vs. Cyclone (10–5) (17–19) Naomi vs. Fire Event 6: The Eliminator Male contenders: Josh / Tyler; Entering the Eliminator, the score was 20–32. This 12-point lead gave Tyler a 6-second head-start. Winner; Josh Female contenders: Ellie / Naomi; Entering the Eliminator, the score was 17–19. This 2-point lead gave Naomi a 1-second head-start. Winner; Naomi
29	7	"Quarter Final 2"	28 February 2026	4.14	9th
The second quarter final sees events like Gauntlet and The Edge played. Returning contenders are Mo and Shaun, Helena and Millie. Although there was no sports coverage that week, the episode was still made available to watch on iPlayer from 6am. Event 1: Everest Male contenders Mo vs. Steel (0–0) (0–0) Shaun vs. Giant Female contenders Helena vs. Sabre (0–0) (0–0) Millie vs. Cyclone First 0-point Everest of the show. Event 2: Unleash Male contenders Mo vs. Nitro (0–0) (0–0) Shaun vs. Hammer Female contenders Helena vs. Electro (0–0) (0–0) Millie vs. Fire Event 3: Gauntlet Male contenders Mo vs. Nitro, Viper, Hammer, Phantom & Apollo (10–8) (10–8) Shaun vs. Viper, Nitro, Hammer, Phantom & Apollo The Gladiator line-ups above reflect the line-ups in each contender's run, as Viper beefed Hammer for no reason before Shaun's run, forcing Nitro to switch positions with Viper. Additionally, during Mo's run, Apollo ringed Mo out of the Gauntlet; he was disqualified for this and, despite only clearing 4 zones, Mo claimed full points. Female contenders Helena vs. Comet, Fire, Dynamite, Electro & Cyclone (6–8) (6–8) Millie vs. Comet, Fire, Dynamite, Electro & Cyclone Event 4: Duel Male contenders Mo vs. Giant (0–0) (10–8) Shaun vs. Phantom Female contenders Helena vs. Comet (5–5) (11–13) Millie vs. Dynamite Event 5: The Edge Male contenders Mo vs. Apollo (10–4) (20–12) Shaun vs. Steel Female contenders Helena vs. Dynamite (6–6) (17–19) Millie vs. Sabre Event 6: The Eliminator Male contenders: Mo / Shaun; Entering the Eliminator, the score was 20–12. This 8-point lead gave Mo a 4-second head-start. Winner; Shaun Female contenders: Helena / Millie; Entering the Eliminator, the score was 17–19. This 2-point lead gave Millie a 1-second head-start. Winner; Millie
30	8	"Quarter Final 3"	7 March 2026	3.54	17th
The last of the quarter finals. Classic Atlaspheres makes a brief return to the series. Contenders are Finn & Hinley, and Emily & Ella from the Heats. This episode was once again available on iPlayer from 6 am due to FA Cup coverage and was aired later than usual due to extra time. Gladiators Bionic and Fury returned, and injured Legend was seen blending in as an audience member in the crowd. Event 1: Destruction Male contenders Finn vs. Apollo (5–0) (5–0) Hinley vs. Apollo This was the first time where barrier 4 was destroyed in one hit. Female contenders Ella vs. Fury (5–0) (5–0) Emily vs. Fury Fury hurt her shoulder playing the event, hence her fewer appearances during the rest of the series. Event 2: Hang Tough Male contenders Finn vs. Bionic (10–0) (15–0) Hinley vs. Viper Viper's first win on Hang Tough. Bionic dislocated his shoulder during the event, forcing him to retire for the rest of the series. Female contenders Ella vs. Fire (0–0) (5–0) Emily vs. Comet Fire's Hang Tough debut. Event 3: Duel Male contenders Finn vs. Giant (0–0) (15–0) Hinley vs. Nitro Giant's rematch against Finn after losing in the heats. Female contenders Ella vs. Sabre (0–0) (5–0) Emily vs. Dynamite Both contenders forfeited their respective duels for making contact with the Gladiator's podium in different ways; Emily stepping onto it and Ella's pugil stick touching it. Event 4: Atlaspheres Male contenders Finn vs. Hammer (2–0) (17–0) Hinley vs. Steel Hammer's Atlaspheres debut. Female contenders Ella vs. Comet (2–6) (7–6) Emily vs. Fire Event 5: Unleash Male contenders Finn vs. Nitro (0–0) (17–0) Hinley vs. Phantom Female contenders Ella vs. Electro (10–10) (17–16) Emily vs. Cyclone Event 6: The Eliminator Male contenders: Finn / Hinley; As Hinley failed to score at all, Finn had a 8.5-second head-start due to his 17 points. Similar to Heat 4, the male contenders went first in the Eliminator. Winner; Finn Female contenders: Ella / Emily; Entering the Eliminator the score was 17–16. This 1-point lead gave Ella a 0.5-second head-start Winner; Ella
31	9	"Semi Final 1"	14 March 2026	3.87	11th
The first Semi Final. Events include Collision, Suspension Bridge and Everest. Contenders were Finn and Mo, Ella and Naomi. Giant made no appearance in the events for undisclosed reasons, and Fury was seen competing on Suspension Bridge with shoulder tapings due to her earlier injury. Event 1: Suspension Bridge Male contenders Mo vs. Nitro (0–0) (0–0) Finn vs. Apollo Female contenders Ella vs. Fire (0–10) (0–10) Naomi vs. Fury Ella forfeited her bout with Fire after losing her hammerhead. Event 2: The Wall Male contenders Mo vs. Phantom (10–0) (10–0) Finn vs. Viper Phantom's Wall debut. Female contenders Ella vs. Dynamite (0–0) (0–10) Naomi vs. Fire Event 3: Collision Male contenders Mo vs. Viper, Apollo, Phantom & Hammer (6–4) (16–4) Finn vs. Viper, Apollo, Phantom & Hammer Female contenders Ella vs. Sabre, Electro, Dynamite & Comet (6–4) (6–14) Naomi vs. Sabre, Electro, Dynamite & Comet Event 4: Everest Male contenders Mo vs. Hammer (0–10) (16–14) Finn vs. Viper Following this event, Mo was found to have been injured after being pushed off the platform. Following Finn's Hang Tough run, it was revealed that Mo had tore his ACL due to landing awkwardly from the fall in Everest. Therefore, Tyler was reinstated for the remainder of the competition. Female contenders Ella vs. Cyclone (0–0) (6–14) Naomi vs. Cyclone Naomi was originally intended to face Fury, but Cyclone selfishly insisted she stay on due to her not being happy with Ella's defeat. Event 5: Hang Tough Male contenders Tyler vs. Nitro (0–0) (16–14) Finn vs. Steel Female contenders Ella vs. Sabre (0–10) (6–24) Naomi vs. Comet Comet's first loss on Hang Tough, as she failed to get a hold on contender Naomi. Event 6: The Eliminator Male contenders: Tyler / Finn; Entering the Eliminator, the score was 16–14. This 2-point lead gave Tyler a 1-second head-start. Winner; Tyler Female contenders: Ella / Naomi; Entering the Eliminator, the score was 6–24. This 18-point lead gave Naomi a 9-second head-start. Winner; Naomi
32	10	"Semi Final 2"	21 March 2026	3.61	18th
The last Semi Final sees contenders Shaun, Josh, Millie and Emily fight for the final places in this year's Grand finals. Legend interrupted the male contenders' introduction, and Giant made his only Semifinal appearance of the year on Everest. Event 1: Everest Male contenders Shaun vs. Phantom (0–0) (0–0) Josh vs. Giant Female contenders Millie vs. Dynamite (10–10) (10–10) Emily vs. Sabre Event 2: Collision Male contenders Shaun vs. Viper, Apollo, Nitro & Phantom (8–10) (8–10) Josh vs. Viper, Apollo, Nitro & Phantom Female contenders Millie vs. Cyclone, Fury, Electro & Fire (4–10) (14–20) Emily vs. Cyclone, Fury, Electro & Fire Fury's first Collision game of the season. Event 3: The Wall Male contenders Shaun vs. Hammer (0–0) (8–10) Josh vs. Nitro Female contenders Millie vs. Sabre (0–10) (14–30) Emily vs. Comet Event 4: Suspension Bridge Male contenders Shaun vs. Viper (5–0) (13–10) Josh vs. Hammer Viper broke the game rules by charging and pushing Shaun off the bridge, resulting in the contender awarded 5 points. Female contenders Millie vs. Electro (0–0) (14–30) Emily vs. Cyclone Event 5: Hang Tough Male contenders Shaun vs. Steel (5–0) (18–10) Josh vs. Apollo Female contenders Millie vs. Fire (5–0) (19–30) Emily vs. Dynamite Event 6: The Eliminator Male contenders: Shaun / Josh; Entering the Eliminator, the score was 18–10. This 8-point lead gave Shaun a 4-second head-start. However, due to Shaun taking two attempts to jump over the final hurdle, he lost his 4 second lead and a lot of distance to Josh. Winner; Josh Female contenders: Millie / Emily; Entering the Eliminator, the score was 19–30. This 11-point lead gave Emily a 5.5-second head-start. Winner; Emily
33	11	"The Final"	28 March 2026	4.18	9th
The Grand Finals, where two contenders will be crowned Gladiators Champions. Events include Unleash and Gauntlet. Finalists are Tyler & Josh, Emily & Naomi. This episode also featured rematch of Josh and Tyler after the former beat the latter on the Eliminator. Electro also opted to race against Bradley Walsh on Unleash after he complimented her speed. Sonia Mkoloma did not feature in this episode, and Purvinder Kaur Shokar served as the assistant referee officially for the first time, replacing Mkoloma in the final. Event 1: Unleash Male contenders Tyler vs. Nitro (0–10) (0–10) Josh vs. Phantom Female contenders Naomi vs. Electro (10–10) (10–10) Emily vs. Fire Fire's first loss on Unleash. After her race against Naomi, Electro opted to race against Bradley. She won the skit event, with Bradley "cheating" by crossing across the course which allowed the gladiator to catch up with him. Event 2: Destruction Male contenders Tyler vs. Giant (10–5) (10–15) Josh vs. Giant The first instance in Destruction in which both contenders defeated the Gladiator. Female contenders Naomi vs. Cyclone (5–0) (15–10) Emily vs. Cyclone Event 3: Gauntlet Male contenders Tyler vs. Hammer, Steel, Viper, Phantom & Apollo (10–10) (20–25) Josh vs. Hammer, Steel, Viper, Phantom & Apollo After Josh's run, Viper agreed to a handshake for this, marking it the first time he has broke the character. Female contenders Naomi vs. Comet, Electro, Fire, Dynamite & Cyclone (10–10) (25–20) Emily vs. Comet, Electro, Fire, Dynamite & Cyclone Event 4: The Edge Male contenders Tyler vs. Steel (6–4) (26–29) Josh vs. Apollo Legend disrupted Guy's commentary in the men's event. Female contenders Naomi vs. Sabre (2–10) (27–30) Emily vs. Fury Fury's only appearance in the Finals, carrying major shoulder injury. Event 5: Duel Male contenders Tyler vs. Hammer (0–0) (26–29) Josh vs. Nitro Female contenders Naomi vs. Dynamite (0–10) (27–40) Emily vs. Sabre Naomi forfeited her duel after her pugil stick made contact with Dynamite's podium. Event 6: The Eliminator Male contenders: Tyler / Josh; Entering the Eliminator, the score was 26–29. This 3-point lead gave Josh a 1.5-second head-start. Winner; Josh Female contenders: Naomi / Emily; Entering the Eliminator, the score was 27–40. This 13-point lead gave Emily a 6.5-second head-start. Winner; Emily

=== Contenders progress ===
Colour key:

Series champions
Series runners-up
The contender won the episode and advanced
The contender won the episode as a substitute for an injured contender
The contender was medically withdrawn from the competition
The contender lost the episode but was later the winner of the head-to-head Duel-off in the heats or fastest loser in the quarter finals and therefore qualified
The contender lost the episode and was eliminated

Contenders	Episodes										
Contenders	Heats					Quarter Finals			Semi Finals		Final
Contenders	1	2	3	4	5	6	7	8	9	10	11
Josh	OUT	—N/a				WIN (Note: See Contenders section above for notes)	—N/a			WIN	CHAMPION
Emily	—N/a	WIN	—N/a					FF	—N/a	WIN	CHAMPION
Naomi	WIN	—N/a				WIN	—N/a		WIN	—N/a	RUNNER-UP
Tyler	—N/a		WIN	—N/a		OUT	—N/a		WIN	—N/a	RUNNER-UP
Millie	—N/a		FF	—N/a			WIN	—N/a		OUT	—N/a
Shaun	—N/a			FF	—N/a		WIN	—N/a		OUT	—N/a
Finn	WIN	—N/a						WIN	OUT	—N/a	
Ella	—N/a			WIN	—N/a			WIN	OUT	—N/a	
Mo	—N/a				WIN	—N/a	FF	—N/a	WDR	—N/a	
Hinley	—N/a			WIN	—N/a			OUT	—N/a		
Helena	—N/a				WIN	—N/a	OUT	—N/a			
Ellie	—N/a		WIN	—N/a		OUT	—N/a				
Mark	—N/a	WIN	—N/a			WDR	—N/a				
Sid	—N/a				OUT	—N/a					
Nikki	—N/a				OUT	—N/a					
Ciara	—N/a			OUT	—N/a						
Elliot	—N/a		OUT	—N/a							
Jason	—N/a	OUT	—N/a								
Gail	—N/a	OUT	—N/a								
Rachael	OUT	—N/a									

== Contender records ==
- Heat 1: Finn became the first contender to defeat Giant and gain 10 points against him on Duel.
- Heat 4: Ella scored a record 12 points on Collision.
- Quarter Final 3: Ella set an unspecified women's record for the fastest time to complete Unleash.
- Grand Final: The Final contained the show's oldest and youngest ever female finalists with Naomi, aged 40, and Emily, who was competing on her 23rd birthday.

The fastest Eliminator times mentioned this season (with the new, more difficult balance beam introduced into the course) were Emily’s 81 seconds in her quarter-final and Tyler’s 69 seconds in his semi-final.

== Gladiator injuries ==
The third season has seen the most Gladiator injuries to date. Male Gladiator Legend (Matt Morsia) damaged his left bicep tendon during a failed tackle that resulted in him falling off The Edge on aired episode 1 (episodes are produced and aired in a different order). Diamond (Livi Sheldon) suffered a major ACL and MCL tear during the fourth aired episode in Powerball, sidelining her for the rest of the series as well.

Athena (Karenjeet Kaur Bains) was last seen competing in Gauntlet in Heat 5. After the filming, she was discovered she had a full ACL tear, in addition to LCL and MCL ruptures, forcing her to step off for a surgery. She wasn't seen on the Celebrity Special either due to this. Bionic (Matty Campbell) received a shoulder injury in Quarter Finals stage playing Hang Tough, forcing him to withdraw from the remainder of the season as well. Fury (Jodie Ounsley) also mildly hurt her shoulder during the early Quarter Finals recordings in a game of Destruction, which required her to step out for few episodes, and makes only sparse appearances during the rest of the series, wearing shoulder tapings.
