= Gladiators (2024 British TV series) series 2 =

Gladiators
- Series 2
- Starring: Bradley Walsh; Barney Walsh; Mark Clattenburg; Sonia Mkoloma; Lee Phillips; Guy Mowbray
- No. of episodes: 12 (including Celebrity special)

Release
- Original network: BBC One
- Original release: 1 January 2025 (Celebrity special)
- Original release: 18 January – 12 April 2025

Series chronology
- ← Previous; Series 1 Next → Series 3

The second series of Gladiators aired in the UK on 18 January 2025 on BBC One. It was recorded in August 2024 at the Sheffield Arena.

The series was commissioned by the BBC after a successful relaunch in 2024, which attracted nearly ten million viewers during its whole first series.

The eleven-part series is being presented by the Walshes (Bradley and Barney), who also presented the first series. Mark Clattenburg returns as the lead referee alongside assistants Lee Phillips and Sonia Mkoloma.

In addition to the regular episodes, the series also has a "one-off" celebrity special episode, where four celebrity contestants; Rob Beckett, Joel Dommett, Louise Minchin and Ellie Taylor, took on the Gladiators.

The first heat episode is dedicated to original Gladiators referee John Anderson, who died in July 2024.

== Gladiators ==
All of the Gladiators from the previous series return this series, with Diamond and Giant being amongst the very first announced returnees. New Gladiators Cyclone (Lystus Ebosele), and Hammer (Tom Wilson) were revealed in the course of the series.

Males			Females		
Gladiator name	Real name	Stats	Gladiator name	Real name	Stats
Apollo	Alex Gray	6 ft 6 in, 249 lb (1.98 m, 113 kg)	Athena	Karenjeet Bains	5 ft 4 in, 148 lb (1.63 m, 67 kg)
Bionic	Matty Campbell	6 ft 6 in, 260 lb (1.98 m, 120 kg)	Comet	Ella-Mae Rayner	5 ft 8 in, 146 lb (1.73 m, 66 kg)
Giant	Jamie Christian-Johal	6 ft 5 in, 280 lb (1.96 m, 130 kg)	Cyclone (Note: Irish powerlifter joined mid-series filming.)	Lystus Ebosele	5 ft 10 in, 209 lb (1.78 m, 95 kg)
Hammer (Note: British indoors rower joined mid-series filming.)	Tom Wilson	6 ft 6 in, 257 lb (1.98 m, 117 kg)	Diamond	Liv Sheldon	6 ft 0 in, 176 lb (1.83 m, 80 kg)
Legend	Matt Morsia	6 ft 1 in, 212 lb (1.85 m, 96 kg)	Dynamite	Emily Steel	5 ft 5 in, 141 lb (1.65 m, 64 kg)
Nitro (Note: Although Nitro featured on the programme, he did not appear in any of the events during the series, due to knee injury he picked up from the trainings.)	Harry Aikines-Aryeetey	5 ft 11 in, 187 lb (1.80 m, 85 kg)	Electro	Jade Packer	5 ft 8 in, 154 lb (1.73 m, 70 kg)
Phantom	Toby Olubi	6 ft 5 in, 247 lb (1.96 m, 112 kg)	Fire	Montell Douglas	5 ft 10 in, 148 lb (1.78 m, 67 kg)
Steel	Zack George	6 ft 0 in, 236 lb (1.83 m, 107 kg)	Fury	Jodie Ounsley	5 ft 7 in, 163 lb (1.70 m, 74 kg)
Viper	Quang Luong	6 ft 0 in, 200 lb (1.83 m, 90 kg)	Sabre	Sheli McCoy	5 ft 7 in, 154 lb (1.70 m, 70 kg)

== Contenders ==
The colours, red and blue, used in the table below denote the colours worn by the contender. The winning contenders are marked in bold. As the series contains only five heats, and three quarter finals, in addition to the winners of the previous episodes, the fastest runner-ups advance to the next stage as wildcards (marked with WC).

Episodes	Male Contenders		Female Contenders	
Celebrity Special	Rob Beckett	**Joel Dommett**	**Ellie Taylor**	Louise Minchin
Heat 1	**Nathan Bland**	Scott Castell	**Zavia Hill**	Katie Ip
Heat 2	**Joe Holroyde**	Aman Yadh	Nikki Billingham	**Keeva Neely** (Note: Contender Keeva advanced directly to the quarter finals round, as Nikki was unable to participate in the Eliminator due to sustaining an injury after The Edge prior.)
Heat 3	Lewis Prothero (WC)	**Mus Dumbuya**	Toni Prothero	**Amanda Wah**
Heat 4	**Joe Fishburn**	Junior Cunningham	Stacey Brown	**Poppy Bulmer**
Heat 5	Nush Sajjad	**Andy Mitchell**	Rachel Bruno-Hardy (WC)	**Aneila Afsar**
Quarter Final 1	Joe Holroyde (WC)	**Mus Dumbuya**	**Zavia Hill**	Poppy Bulmer
Quarter Final 2	**Joe Fishburn**	Lewis Prothero	Aneila Afsar (WC)	**Amanda Wah**
Quarter Final 3	**Nathan Bland**	Andy Mitchell	Rachel Bruno-Hardy	**Keeva Neely**
Semi Final 1	**Joe Fishburn**	Joe Holroyde	Keeva Neely	**Amanda Wah**
Semi Final 2	Nathan Bland	**Mus Dumbuya**	**Zavia Hill**	Aneila Afsar
Grand Final	**Joe Fishburn**	Mus Dumbuya	Zavia Hill/Aneila Afsar (Note: Though Zavia won in the Eliminator in the semi final, a post from the official Gladiators Instagram later revealed that she was forced to withdraw before the Grand Final due to an injury she had sustained during the Powerball event, with Aneila, who was the fastest runner-up, taking her place in the Grand Final. Zavia appeared in the audience throughout the Final.)	**Amanda Wah**
Winners	Joe Fishburn		Amanda Wah	

== Events ==
In addition to all of the events from the previous series (Duel, Gauntlet, Hang Tough, Collision, The Ring, Powerball, The Wall, The Edge and The Eliminator), some new events are introduced on the second series of Gladiators.

Following events were added to the roster:

- Atlaspheres, which returns from the 1990s version. In the event, the contenders are inside large metal cages, or "spheres" and try to gain points by crossing different score pods on the arena floor, while two Gladiators try to prevent this inside their own spheres. The contenders earn 2 points for every check in the pods.
- Crash Course is a modification of Atlaspheres, where the contenders must race around the arena while simultaneously being pursued by the Gladiators, trying to catch the contenders in their own spheres, before these reach the finish line. The first to complete two laps earns 10 points, and the second has a limited time to reach to finish line after that, to claim 5 points.
- Unleash is a new game of tag, where the contender must make it around the arena floor, and grab a "G" flag from the top of a podium, while a Gladiator is "Unleashed" and starts a pursuit behind them. 10 points for the contender are up to grab if they can pick up the hanging flag at the top of the platform. 5 points for jumping for the flag, and 0 points if the gladiator reaches the contender and grabs this flag behind their back. The competitors must climb the steps to the platform one at a time, or they will be disqualified automatically.

As the result of fan feedback from the previous series, the Gauntlet received some major upgrades for this series. An additional fifth zone/Gladiator was added, and a new "shield" weapon resembling the shape of a claw or bucket was introduced.

== Episodes ==
Note, that some of the episodes are shown in a different order from that which they were filmed in.

No. overall	No. in series	Title	BBC One airdate	UK viewers (millions)	Weekly Rank
–	–	"Celebrity Special"	1 January 2025	6.04	9th
Competing in the New Year’s Celebrity Special are: Rob Beckett, Louise Minchin, Joel Dommett and Ellie Taylor. The celebrities face the Gladiators in events like the classical Duel and the updated version of Gauntlet, before taking on each other in the legendary Eliminator. The episode saw gladiator Comet's first appearance on the show since major injury she suffered last series. Male gladiator Giant featured only in the locker room with the other Gladiators in this episode. This special episode was announced by the BBC on 7 August 2024, and was recorded in between the regular series' production. Event 1: Collision Male contenders Rob Beckett vs. Steel, Bionic, Viper & Apollo (4–8) (4–8) Joel Dommett vs. Steel, Bionic, Viper & Apollo Female contenders Ellie Taylor vs. Sabre, Comet, Fire & Athena (6–8) (6–8) Louise Minchin vs. Sabre, Comet, Fire & Athena Sabre's very first Collision outing. Louise suffered a graze on her philtrum after being knocked off. Event 2: Duel Male contenders Rob Beckett vs. Legend (0–0) (4–8) Joel Dommett vs. Phantom Although not shown on the programme – Viper appeared to climb to the podiums against Joel Dommett – but he was dispatched by the referee after refusing to use a helmet. Instead it was Phantom who played the round. Female contenders Ellie Taylor vs. Dynamite (5–5) (11–13) Louise Minchin vs. Fire Event 3: Gauntlet Male contenders Rob Beckett vs. Viper, Steel, Legend, Apollo & Phantom (10–6) (14–14) Joel Dommett vs. Viper, Steel, Legend, Apollo & Phantom Revamped version of the event, where the contenders have to now get past 5 Gladiators. A new weapon is introduced for the 4th Gladiator in line. Female contenders Ellie Taylor vs. Electro, Athena, Fury, Dynamite & Diamond (8–6) (19–19) Louise Minchin vs. Electro, Athena, Fury, Dynamite & Diamond Event 4: Powerball Male contenders Rob Beckett vs. Apollo, Bionic & Steel (2–3) (16–17) Joel Dommett vs. Apollo, Bionic & Steel After the event ended, the Gladiators rushed and put both the contenders and the hosts in the Powerball "bins", for comedy. Female contenders Ellie Taylor vs. Sabre, Electro & Fury (2–4) (21–25) Louise Minchin vs. Sabre, Electro & Fury The scores for the women's game above reflect the scoreboard during the event and the aggregate scoreboard; Louise's first ball bounced out of the basket it was put in, but was deemed to have counted towards her score, therefore she scored 6 points. Event 5: The Eliminator Male contenders: Rob Beckett / Joel Dommett; Entering the Eliminator, the score was 16-17. This 1-point lead gave Joel Dommett a 0.5-second head start. Winner; Joel Dommett Female contenders: Ellie Taylor / Louise Minchin; Entering the Eliminator, the score was 21-25. This 4-point lead gave Louise Minchin a 2-second head start. She had to be assisted by the referees through the hurdles. This cost her the race, as she lost a lot of distance to Ellie Taylor. Winner; Ellie Taylor
12	1	"Heat 1"	18 January 2025	5.38	8th
The heats begin. The 15 returning Gladiators face another set of contenders from all over the UK. Two new Gladiators are introduced this series – and some new events. For this series, Gladiator Nitro shifts to support his fellow colleagues due to an injury he picked up during training sessions. The contenders for the heat are: Nathan, and Scott, Zavia and Katie. The first heat sees classical events like Duel and The Wall being played, in addition to the returning 90's classic Atlaspheres. Giant, who is so far unbeaten in the event – returns to Duel. Event 1: The Edge Male contenders Nathan vs. Apollo (10–2) (10–2) Scott vs. Legend Female contenders Zavia vs. Fury (10–4) (10–4) Katie vs. Sabre Event 2: Duel Male contenders Nathan vs. Giant (5–0) (15–2) Scott vs. Phantom Giant's first draw with a contender on the event. Female contenders Zavia vs. Diamond (0–0) (10–4) Katie vs. Fire Event 3: Atlaspheres Male contenders Nathan vs. Steel (6–6) (21–8) Scott vs. Giant Female contenders Zavia vs. Sabre (2–4) (12–8) Katie vs. Diamond Event 4: The Wall Male contenders Nathan vs. Legend (0–0) (21–8) Scott vs. Viper Viper's first sole event victory on The Wall. After the event, he commented his performance saying "Piece of cake!" and laughing maniacly, before dropping the microphone and storming off. Scott also suffered a dislocated finger from when Viper pulled him off. Female contenders Zavia vs. Comet (10–5) (22–13) Katie vs. Athena Event 5: Powerball Male contenders Nathan vs. Phantom, Steel & Bionic (6–0) (27–8) Scott vs. Phantom, Steel & Bionic Female contenders Zavia vs. Electro, Fury & Dynamite (12–2) (34–13) Katie vs. Electro, Fury & Dynamite The women's scores above reflect the scoreboard during the event and the aggregate score. Katie's only ball was deemed invalid as she broke the rule of not taking it from the opposite bin after losing the one prior. Event 6: The Eliminator Male contenders: Nathan / Scott; Entering the Eliminator, the score was 27–8. This 19-point lead gave Nathan a 9.5-second head-start. Winner; Nathan Female contenders: Zavia / Katie; Entering the Eliminator, the score was 34–13. This 21-point lead gave Zavia a 10.5-second head-start. Winner; Zavia
13	2	"Heat 2"	25 January 2025	4.94	10th
Second of the heats. The contenders for the heat are: Joe and Aman; and Nikki and Keeva. New female Gladiator, Cyclone, debuts in this episode. Events for this heat include the classics Duel and The Wall, in addition to the renewed Gauntlet. During a round of The Edge, female contender Nikki suffered an injury upon falling from the edge with Gladiator Dynamite. She was subsequently dispatched from the competition by the medical team, and was not able to do the Eliminator – therefore putting Keeva straight through to the quarter finals. This marks the first time in the show's history where only one Eliminator is played. Event 1: Duel Male contenders Joe vs. Bionic (0–0) (0–0) Aman vs. Steel Aman forfeited the event after falling onto Steel's podium. Female contenders Nikki vs. Cyclone (0–0) (0–0) Keeva vs. Cyclone Cyclone won by default in her duel with Keeva after the latter put her pugil stick down onto her own podium. Event 2: Gauntlet Male contenders Joe vs. Steel, Bionic, Apollo, Phantom and Giant (6–10) (6–10) Aman vs. Steel, Bionic, Apollo, Phantom and Giant The Gladiator line-up represents the initial set-up; Steel and Bionic swapped weapons so that Bionic would guard the first zone. Apollo was subsequently disqualified for pushing Joe into the next zone. Female contenders Nikki vs. Fire, Sabre, Athena, Dynamite, and Cyclone (8–10) (8–10) Keeva vs. Fire, Sabre, Athena, Dynamite, and Cyclone Nikki's run was briefly stopped after she lost her helmet. In Keeva's run, Sabre was disqualified for leaving her zone whilst holding Keeva. Event 3: The Wall Male contenders Joe vs. Legend (5–10) (11–20) Aman vs. Apollo Before trying to eliminate his contender from the Wall, Legend played with this, and bypassed this to the top of the Wall. However, the Gladiator had not enough time left to dispatch the contender from the Wall, hence the game ending with a draw; earning the contender 5 points. Female contenders Nikki vs. Comet (10–0) (18–10) Keeva vs. Diamond Event 4: Collision Male contenders Joe vs. Viper, Giant, Legend, and Phantom (8–6) (19–26) Aman vs. Viper, Giant, Legend, and Phantom Female contenders Nikki vs. Comet, Diamond, Fire, and Electro (0–10) (18–18) Keeva vs. Comet, Diamond, Fire, and Electro The scores above reflect Keeva's scores on the scoreboard during the event and the aggregate score. Keeva repeatedly stopped during her run, so despite scoring 10 points, she received a 2-point penalty for her actions and scored 8 instead. Event 5: The Edge Male contenders Joe vs. Steel (2–2) (21–28) Aman vs. Legend Female contenders Nikki vs. Dynamite (2–2) (20–20) Keeva vs. Fury Nikki suffered an unspecified injury after she fell from The Edge. She was eventually deemed to be unable to continue, so Keeva automatically qualified for the quarter finals. Event 6: The Eliminator Male contenders: Joe / Aman; Entering the Eliminator, the score was 21–28. This 7-point lead gave Aman a 3.5-second head-start. Winner; Joe Female contenders The female Eliminator was cancelled due to Nikki's earlier unrecoverable injury. Winner; Keeva (by default)
14	3	"Heat 3"	1 February 2025	5.11	7th
Third of the heats. A new event, a fast-paced pursuit game Unleash, is revealed. Other events include The Wall, Atlaspheres and The Ring, which is being played for the first time this series. This is the first episode of the revival series not to feature Duel. The contenders for this heat are: Lewis and Mus, and Toni and Amanda. Event 1: The Ring Male contenders Lewis vs. Phantom (12–6) (12–6) Mus vs. Steel Female contenders Toni vs. Electro (10–12) (10–12) Amanda vs. Sabre Amanda suffered a calf cramp in the first 15 seconds. She was given the option to forfeit or continue and ultimately chose the latter. Event 2: Unleash Male contenders Lewis vs. Apollo (0–10) (12–16) Mus vs. Phantom Phantom broke the rules twice by cutting the final corner on the track and ascending the stairs two by two. He was therefore disqualified meaning that despite defeat, Mus automatically won the event. Female contenders Toni vs. Cyclone (5–0) (15–12) Amanda vs. Fire Like Phantom, Toni inadvertently broke the rules by ascending the steps two by two. Therefore despite capturing the flag, she was only rewarded 5 points. Event 3: The Wall Male contenders Lewis vs. Viper (5–10) (17–26) Mus vs. Legend Female contenders Toni vs. Athena (0–10) (15–22) Amanda vs. Dynamite Event 4: The Edge Male contenders Lewis vs. Steel (2–2) (19–28) Mus vs. Apollo Female contenders Toni vs. Diamond (10–2) (25–24) Amanda vs. Fury Event 5: Atlaspheres Male contenders Lewis vs. Bionic (6–6) (25–34) Mus vs. Giant Female contenders Toni vs. Cyclone (0–2) (25–26) Amanda vs. Comet Event 6: The Eliminator Male contenders: Lewis / Mus; Entering the Eliminator, the score was 25–34. This 9-point lead gave Mus a 4.5-second head-start. Mus also broke the then-current male Eliminator record of 1.06 by 2 seconds. Winner; Mustapha Female contenders: Toni / Amanda; Entering the Eliminator, the score was 25–26. This 1-point lead gave Amanda a 0.5-second head-start. Winner; Amanda
15	4	"Heat 4"	15 February 2025	4.96	7th
Fourth of the heats. Hang Tough event returns for the first time in this series. The contenders for the heat are: Joe and Junior, and Stacey and Poppy. Event 1: Unleash Male contenders Joe vs. Apollo (10–0) (10–0) Junior vs. Phantom Female contenders Stacey vs. Electro (0–0) (0–0) Poppy vs. Fire Event 2: Gauntlet Male contenders Joe vs. Viper, Phantom, Legend, Bionic and Giant (10–6) (20–6) Junior vs. Viper, Phantom, Legend, Bionic and Giant Viper tried to confront Joe before his run; Joe's run was subsequently stopped twice – first when he lost his helmet and then when Legend ringed him out of the Gauntlet. Junior's run likewise was stopped after Bionic held him and didn't let go. Female contenders Stacey vs. Athena, Fury, Electro, Sabre and Diamond (8–10) (8–10) Poppy vs. Athena, Fury, Electro, Sabre and Diamond Stacey's run was briefly stopped when Sabre deliberately pinned her down, for which Sabre was disqualified. Event 3: Hang Tough Male contenders Joe vs. Legend (0–10) (20–16) Junior vs. Viper Viper's first outing at Hang Tough. Female contenders Stacey vs. Comet (0–10) (8–20) Poppy vs. Sabre Event 4: Duel Male contenders Joe vs. Bionic (0–0) (20–16) Junior vs. Giant Female contenders Stacey vs. Dynamite (0–0) (8–20) Poppy vs. Diamond Event 5: The Ring Male contenders Joe vs. Steel (6–2) (26–18) Junior vs. Apollo The game was briefly stopped early after Junior injured his hamstring. Junior opted not to continue the event, leaving Joe to take on the event unopposed for the remainder of the time limit. Female contenders Stacey vs. Athena (12–8) (20–28) Poppy vs. Fury Event 6: The Eliminator Male contenders: Joe / Junior; Entering the Eliminator, the score was 26–18. This 8-point lead gave Joe a 4-second head-start. Joe also broke the previous male Eliminator record by a second. Winner; Joe Female contenders: Stacey / Poppy; Entering the Eliminator, the score was 20–28. This 8-point lead gave Poppy a 4-second head-start. Winner; Poppy
16	5	"Heat 5"	22 February 2025	4.90	11th
The last of the heats include Duel, Hang Tough and Unleash being played. The contenders for the heat are: Nush and Andy, and Rachel and Aneila. Gladiator Giant tore his biceps on Powerball, and had to be sidelined for the rest of the series. Event 1: Duel Male contenders Nush vs. Legend (0–0) (0–0) Andy vs. Steel Female contenders Rachel vs. Comet (5–0) (5–0) Aneila vs. Dynamite Event 2: Atlaspheres Male contenders Nush vs. Steel (10–6) (10–6) Andy vs. Apollo Female contenders Rachel vs. Fire (2–8) (7–8) Aneila vs. Sabre This was the last event in the heat where the female contenders scored points; no further points were scored in any of the subsequent events at all. Event 3: Hang Tough Male contenders Nush vs. Bionic (10–0) (20–6) Andy vs. Apollo Both Bionic and Apollo's first Hang Tough outings. Andy reached the platform but lost his balance and fell off, resulting in him scoring no points Female contenders Rachel vs. Athena (0–0) (7–8) Aneila vs. Sabre Event 4: Unleash Male contenders Nush vs. Phantom (0–10) (20–16) Andy vs. Viper Viper was sent to the referees' room due to his outburst, where he trashed it before leaving. He didn't return for the rest of the episode due to him cleaning up the referees' room as told by the referee. Female contenders Rachel vs. Fury (0–0) (7–8) Aneila vs. Electro Event 5: Powerball Male contenders Nush vs. Giant, Legend & Phantom (4–6) (24–22) Andy vs. Giant, Legend & Phantom The event was briefly stopped after Giant pulled his arm, forcing him to withdraw from the event for the remainder of the event time. Female contenders Rachel vs. Diamond, Dynamite & Cyclone (0–0) (7–8) Aneila vs. Diamond, Dynamite & Cyclone First 0-point Powerball round of the rewamped series. Event 6: The Eliminator Male contenders: Nush / Andy; Entering the Eliminator, the score was 24–22. This 2-point lead gave Nush a 1-second head-start. Winner; Andy Female contenders: Rachel / Aneila; Entering the Eliminator, the score was 7–8. This 1-point lead gave Aneila a 0.5-second head-start. Winner; Aneila
17	6	"Quarter Final 1"	1 March 2025	4.62	7th
New male Gladiator, Hammer, debuts in this episode. Injured Gladiator Giant is still seen in the locker room after the arm injury in heat 5. Contenders for this quarter finals are Joe from heat 2, Mus from heat 3, Zavia from heat 1 and Poppy from heat 4. Event 1: Hang Tough Male contenders Joe vs. Legend (10–10) (10–10) Mus vs. Legend Legend opted for playing the event twice, for losing the first round. Female contenders Zavia vs. Comet (5–0) (5–0) Poppy vs. Athena Event 2: Collision Male contenders Joe vs. Steel, Bionic, Viper & Phantom (2–0) (12–10) Mus vs. Steel, Bionic, Viper & Phantom Female contenders Zavia vs. Sabre, Electro, Dynamite & Fury (4–2) (9–2) Poppy vs. Sabre, Electro, Dynamite & Fury Event 3: The Wall Male contenders Joe vs. Legend (0–10) (12–20) Mus vs. Apollo Female contenders Zavia vs. Fire (10–5) (19–7) Poppy vs. Sabre Event 4: Duel Male contenders Joe vs. Phantom (0–0) (12–20) Mus vs. Hammer Female contenders Zavia vs. Diamond (0–0) (19–7) Poppy vs. Cyclone Zavia forfeited the event by stepping onto Diamond's platform before falling off. Event 5: Gauntlet Male contenders Joe vs. Viper, Steel, Apollo, Bionic & Hammer (8–6) (20–26) Mus vs. Viper, Steel, Apollo, Bionic & Hammer Female contenders Zavia vs. Cyclone, Fury, Electro, Fire & Diamond (8–10) (27–17) Poppy vs. Cyclone, Fury, Electro, Fire & Diamond Zavia's run was briefly stopped when Fury deliberately threw Zavia into the next zone. Fury was disqualified for this and the event was restarted from zone 3. In Poppy's run, though time ran out, Diamond was ruled as illegally having used her arm to hold Poppy back, therefore Poppy was rewarded the full 10 points. Event 6: The Eliminator Male contenders: Joe / Mus; Entering the Eliminator, the score was 20–26. This 6-point lead gave Mus a 3-second head-start. Winner; Mus Female contenders: Zavia / Poppy; Entering the Eliminator, the score was 27–17. This 10-point lead gave Zavia a 5-second head-start.Zavia also broke her previous female Eliminator record by 6 seconds. Winner; Zavia
18	7	"Quarter Final 2"	8 March 2025	4.21	11th
New event Crash Course appears in this episode. Contenders in this episode are: Joe from heat 4, Lewis from heat 3, Aneila from heat 5 and Amanda from heat 3. Lewis was the fastest runner-up for the male contenders. Event 1: Unleash Male contenders Joe vs. Phantom (5–10) (5–10) Lewis vs. Hammer Though Joe reached the platform, he missed the flag and therefore claimed 5 points for reaching the platform. Female contenders Aneila vs. Cyclone (10–0) (10–0) Amanda vs. Electro Event 2: The Wall Male contenders Joe vs. Legend (10–0) (15–10) Lewis vs. Viper Viper won by default as Lewis fell from the Wall in the cause of mis-step. Female contenders Aneila vs. Diamond (10–5) (20–5) Amanda vs. Comet Event 3: Crash Course Male contenders Joe vs. Bionic & Steel (5–10) (20–20) Lewis vs. Bionic & Steel Female contenders Aneila vs. Fire & Dynamite (5–10) (25–15) Amanda vs. Fire & Dynamite Event 4: The Edge Male contenders Joe vs. Apollo (10–10) (30–30) Lewis vs. Steel Female contenders Aneila vs. Dynamite (0–10) (25–25) Amanda vs. Sabre Event 5: Powerball Male contenders Joe vs. Apollo, Legend & Hammer (4–4) (34–34) Lewis vs. Apollo, Legend & Hammer The game was briefly stopped when the Gladiators illegally went into the contenders' zone. Legend also illegally took one of the red balls out of a basket, but the score was allowed. Female contenders Aneila vs. Sabre, Athena & Fury (4–6) (29–31) Amanda vs. Sabre, Athena & Fury Event 6: The Eliminator Male contenders: Joe / Lewis; Both contenders' scores were tied going into the Eliminator, meaning neither got a time advantage. Winner; Joe Female contenders: Aneila / Amanda; Entering the Eliminator, the score was 29–31. This 2-point lead gave Amanda a 1-second head-start. Amanda also broke the previous female Eliminator record of 1:35 by 9 seconds. Winner; Amanda
19	8	"Quarter Final 3"	15 March 2025	4.97	9th
The third and final of the quarter finals. Giant featured in the show to detail his injury on Powerball he suffered in the last heat episode. This episode marks the last time The Ring is played. Contenders in this quarter final are: Nathan from heat 1, Andy from heat 5, Rachel from heat 5 as the fastest runner-up from the female contenders, and Keeva from heat 2. Event 1: Duel Male contenders Nathan vs. Bionic (10–0) (10–0) Andy vs. Apollo Nathan won by default due to Bionic stepping onto his platform. Female contenders Rachel vs. Cyclone (0–5) (0–5) Keeva vs. Fury Keeva's duel with Fury was briefly stopped when her helmet was dislodged. Event 2: Unleash Male contenders Nathan vs. Phantom (5–0) (15–0) Andy vs. Hammer Though Phantom won, he was found to have illegally held onto Nathan's harness before removing his tag, meaning Nathan won by default. Female contenders Rachel vs. Electro (0–0) (0–5) Keeva vs. Fire Event 3: The Ring Male contenders Nathan vs. Steel (8–8) (23–8) Andy vs. Phantom The game was briefly stopped after Nathan lost his helmet. Female contenders Rachel vs. Dynamite (6–10) (6–15) Keeva vs. Sabre Event 4: The Wall Male contenders Nathan vs. Legend (5–10) (28–18) Andy vs. Viper Female contenders Rachel vs. Athena (0–10) (6–25) Keeva vs. Fire Event 5: The Edge Male contenders Nathan vs. Steel (10–2) (38–20) Andy vs. Legend Female contenders Rachel vs. Fury (4–2) (10–27) Keeva vs. Diamond Event 6: The Eliminator Male contenders: Nathan / Andy; Entering the Eliminator, the score was 38–20. This 18-point lead gave Nathan a 9-second head-start. Nathan also broke the previous men's Eliminator record of 1:03 by 4 seconds. Winner; Nathan Female contenders: Rachel / Keeva; Entering the Eliminator, the score was 10–27. This 17-point lead gave Keeva a 8.5-second head-start. Winner; Keeva
–	–	"Comic Relief Special"	21 March 2025	2.06	N/A
During the Comic Relief Red Nose Day 2025 episode, Chabuddy G took on gladiator Bionic in even Duel, and was seen doing skit in the locker room with Nitro, Diamond and other gladiators. Chabuddy was allegedly also disqualified from the arena by referee Mark Clattenburg by "stuffing heavyweight plates" inside a pugil stick to cheat in Duel. Event 1: Duel Male contenders (0) (0) Chabuddy G vs. Bionic In the skit event, Chabuddy G managed to distract gladiator Bionic off the podium by shouting "protein shake" and pointing away, before hitting the gladiator off, claiming full 10 points. However, he was later disqualified from "cheating" in the event. Female contenders
20	9	"Semi Final 1"	22 March 2025	4.34	12th
The first of the semi-finals. Contenders in this episode are: Joe F, Joe H, Keeva and Amanda, with Joe H qualified as the fastest runner up of the male contenders from the quarter-finals. Event 1: Gauntlet Male contenders Joe F. vs. Hammer, Phantom, Legend, Apollo & Bionic (6–10) (6–10) Joe H. vs. Hammer, Phantom, Legend, Apollo & Bionic Joe F.'s run was stopped after he was ringed out after clearing 3 zones; he was ruled to have deliberately jumped out of the gauntlet and therefore only claimed 6 points. Female contenders Keeva vs. Athena, Electro, Cyclone, Fire & Diamond (10–6) (10–6) Amanda vs. Cyclone, Electro, Athena, Fire & Diamond The Gladiator line-ups represent the female contender's respective runs; Cyclone and Athena switched zones for Amanda's run. Event 2: Duel Male contenders Joe F. vs. Bionic (0–0) (6–10) Joe H. vs. Legend Female contenders Keeva vs. Fury (0–0) (10–6) Amanda vs. Diamond Event 3: Collision Male contenders Joe F. vs. Bionic, Phantom, Hammer & Viper (6–10) (12–20) Joe H. vs. Bionic, Phantom, Apollo & Viper The Gladiator line-ups reflect the two Joes' respective runs; Hammer pulled his arm during Joe F.'s run, so Apollo substituted him for Joe H.'s run. Female contenders Keeva vs. Sabre, Comet, Electro & Fire (8–6) (18–12) Amanda vs. Sabre, Comet, Electro & Fire Event 4: The Wall Male contenders Joe F. vs. Steel (10–0) (22–20) Joe H. vs. Viper Female contenders Keeva vs. Sabre (5–10) (23–22) Amanda vs. Dynamite Event 5: Powerball Male contenders Joe F. vs. Apollo, Legend & Steel (4–7) (26–27) Joe H. vs. Apollo, Legend & Steel Female contenders Keeva vs. Fury, Dynamite & Cyclone (2–18) (25–40) Amanda vs. Fury, Dynamite & Cyclone The event was briefly stopped when Amanda lost a shoe. Event 6: The Eliminator Male contenders: Joe F. / Joe H.; Entering the Eliminator, the score was 26–27. This 1-point lead gave Joe H. a 0.5-second head-start. Winner; Joe F. Female contenders: Keeva / Amanda; Entering the Eliminator, the score was 25–40. This 15-point lead gave Amanda a 7.5-second head-start. Winner; Amanda
21	10	"Semi Final 2"	5 April 2025	3.86	12th
The second of the semi-finals. Contenders in this episode are: Nathan, Mus, Zavia and Aneila, with Aneila qualified as the fastest runner up of the female contenders from the quarter finals. Event 1: Duel Male contenders Nathan vs. Phantom (0–5) (0–5) Mus vs. Steel Both Mus and Steel fell off their podiums in their Duel. Steel was ruled to have pushed Mus off illegally and therefore Mus scored 5 points. Female contenders Zavia vs. Fire (5–5) (5–5) Aneila vs. Comet Event 2: Collision Male contenders Nathan vs. Legend, Steel, Viper & Apollo (2–2) (2–7) Mus vs. Legend, Steel, Viper & Apollo Female contenders Zavia vs. Dynamite, Diamond, Athena & Fury (8–6) (13–9) Aneila vs. Dynamite, Diamond, Athena & Fury The female scores above reflect the scores during the event and the aggregate scores. One of Aneila's balls wasn't counted as she picked it up after it fell onto the bridge, therefore only scoring 4 points. Event 3: The Wall Male contenders Nathan vs. Apollo (5–10) (7–17) Mus vs. Legend Female contenders Zavia vs. Diamond (0–0) (13–9) Aneila vs. Athena Event 4: Powerball Male contenders Nathan vs. Bionic, Phantom & Hammer (4–6) (11–23) Mus vs. Bionic, Phantom & Hammer The event was briefly stopped when Bionic lost a shoe. Female contenders Zavia vs. Sabre, Fire & Electro (2–6) (15–15) Aneila vs. Sabre, Fire & Electro The event was stopped twice, first after a tackle from Sabre seemed to injure Zavia, and then when a tackle from Fire seemed to result in Zavia twisting her knee. She was allowed to continue both times. Event 5: Gauntlet Male contenders Nathan vs. Hammer, Viper, Legend, Apollo & Bionic (10–10) (21–33) Mus vs. Hammer, Viper, Legend, Apollo & Bionic After the event, Legend and Viper had a fight over Viper getting tired of Legend's "selfish" persona, and the other male Gladiators had to calm them down. Female contenders Zavia vs. Electro, Fury, Dynamite, Sabre & Cyclone (6–8) (21–23) Aneila vs. Electro, Fury, Dynamite, Sabre & Cyclone The event was briefly stopped during both contenders' runs. Zavia's was stopped after she cleared zone 3 when she seemed to suffer a reoccurrence of her injury in the previous event. She opted to complete the event. Aneila's was stopped after Sabre refused to back down after clearing zone 4. Event 6: The Eliminator Male contenders: Nathan / Mus; Entering the Eliminator, the score was 21–33. This 12-point lead gave Mus a 6-second head-start. He also beat Nathan's Eliminator record by 2 seconds. Winner; Mus Female contenders: Zavia / Aneila; Entering the Eliminator, the score was 21–23. This 2-point lead gave Aneila a 1-second head-start. Winner; Zavia (later withdrew)
22	11	"The Final"	12 April 2025	4.71	6th
The series champions are crowned at the end of this episode. events include new Unleash and Crash Course. The male contenders are Joe F and Mus and the female finalists were Aneila and Amanda. It was announced that Zavia withdrew after the injury during the semi-final with Aneila replacing her for the final. Event 1: The Edge Male contenders Joe F vs. Legend (4–2) (4–2) Mus vs. Apollo Female contenders Aneila vs. Sabre (4–6) (4–6) Amanda vs. Fury Event 2: Unleash Male contenders Joe F vs. Hammer (10–10) (14–12) Mus vs. Phantom Female contenders Aneila vs. Electro (10–0) (14–6) Amanda vs. Fire Event 3: The Wall Male contenders Joe F vs. Apollo (10–5) (24–17) Mus vs. Legend To get back at Mus for his previous losses on The Wall, Legend demanded to change the rules for the men's event so that each contender raced their respective Gladiator to the top of the Wall, with 10 points rewarded for the contender if they got to the top first or 5 points if they lost but reached the top within the 20 second time limit. Female contenders Aneila vs. Diamond (0–10) (14–16) Amanda vs. Athena Event 4: Crash Course Male contenders Joe F vs. Viper & Apollo (10–5) (34–22) Mus vs. Viper & Apollo Viper's only appearance in this series' Grand Finals. Upon exiting his sphere, Viper threw a tantrum by smashing a pole to the sphere, throwing it off and storming off the set refusing to speak to the presenters. Female contenders Aneila vs. Cyclone & Comet (10–5) (24–21) Amanda vs. Cyclone & Comet Event 5: Duel Male contenders Joe F vs. Phantom (0–0) (34–22) Mus vs. Hammer Mus forfeited his duel after stepping onto Hammer's podium. Female contenders Aneila vs. Dynamite (0–0) (24–21) Amanda vs. Sabre Aneila forfeited her duel after losing her pugil stick. Though Amanda survived her duel, she was ruled to have deliberately gone down on her knees to avoid Sabre's attacks and therefore Sabre won by default. Event 6: The Eliminator Male contenders: Joe F / Mus; Entering the Eliminator, the score was 34–22. This 12-point lead gave Joe a 6-second head-start. Joe also broke the previous men's Eliminator record by 2 seconds. Winner; Joe Female contenders: Aneila / Amanda; Entering the Eliminator, the score was 24–21. This 3-point lead gave Aneila a 1.5-second head-start. Amanda also broke the previous female Eliminator record by 8 seconds. Winner; Amanda

=== Contenders progress (excluding Celebrity Special) ===
Colour key:

Series champions
Series runners-up
The contender won the episode and advanced
The contender was medically withdrawn from the competition
The contender lost the episode but was the fastest finisher out of the other eliminated contenders and thus qualified
The contender lost the episode and was eliminated

Contenders	Episodes										
Contenders	Heats					Quarter Finals			Semi Finals		Final
Contenders	1	2	3	4	5	6	7	8	9	10	11
Amanda	—N/a		WIN	—N/a			WIN	—N/a	WIN	—N/a	CHAMPION
Joe F.	—N/a			WIN	—N/a		WIN	—N/a	WIN	—N/a	CHAMPION
Mus	—N/a		WIN	—N/a		WIN	—N/a			WIN	RUNNER-UP
Aneila	—N/a				WIN	—N/a	FF	—N/a		FF	RUNNER-UP (Note: See Contenders section above for notes)
Zavia	WIN	—N/a				WIN	—N/a			WIN	WDR
Nathan	WIN	—N/a						WIN	—N/a	OUT	—N/a
Joe H.	—N/a	WIN	—N/a			FF	—N/a		OUT	—N/a	
Keeva	—N/a	WIN	—N/a					WIN	OUT	—N/a	
Andy	—N/a				WIN	—N/a		OUT	—N/a		
Rachel	—N/a				FF	—N/a		OUT	—N/a		
Lewis	—N/a		FF	—N/a			OUT	—N/a			
Poppy	—N/a			WIN	—N/a	OUT	—N/a				
Nush	—N/a				OUT	—N/a					
Junior	—N/a			OUT	—N/a						
Stacey	—N/a			OUT	—N/a						
Toni	—N/a		OUT	—N/a							
Aman	—N/a	OUT	—N/a								
Nikki	—N/a	WDR	—N/a								
Scott	OUT	—N/a									
Katie	OUT	—N/a									

== Contender records ==
Records announced during the series include:

- Heat 3: Mus set a record time of under 15 seconds to climb The Wall, a record he broke in the semi-final.
- Heat 4: Poppy became the first contender to complete Hang Tough and gain the full 10 points. This was matched in the same episode by Junior. Joe F. set an unwanted record for the shortest time lasted on Duel, with 2 seconds. He then set an Eliminator Record of 1:03.
- Quarter Final 1: Mus set an unwanted record for the fastest time to be knocked off Collision, with 4.4 seconds.
- Quarter Final 2: Joe F. set a record time for gaining the full 10 points on The Edge, with 19.7 seconds.
- Quarter Final 4: Nathan beat Mus' Eliminator Record with 0:59.
- Semi Final 1: Amanda scored a record 18 points in Powerball.
- Semi Final 2: Mus re-took the Eliminator Record with 0:57.
- Final: Amanda set the women's Eliminator Record with 1:18, and Joe F. beat Mus's Eliminator Record with 0:55.

== Gladiator injuries ==
During the training sessions for the second series, Gladiator Nitro (Harry Aikines-Aryeetey) picked up a knee injury whilst training for one of the new events this season, Unleash, and was therefore forced to step out of competing in the events for the series. He was still seen in the programme, "hyping up" his fellow Gladiators and bringing the "Nitro energy" to the arena.

During filming of the second series, Giant (Jamie Christian-Johal) also suffered a severe injury, as he tore his biceps during Powerball in Heat 5. Due to this, he was also sidelined for the rest of the series, but still appears on the locker room segment from the Celebrity Special onwards. Although not seen explicitly, both Bionic (Matty Campbell) and Steel (Zack George) also suffered injuries competing in Gauntlet and Duel respectively, during Semi-Finals stage, owing to both's absence from the events of the Grand Final.
