= Arnold Payne =

Arnold Payne may refer to:

- Arnold Payne (cricketer), English cricketer
- Arnold Payne (athlete), Zimbabwean runner
- Arnold Payne, one of the hoaxers collectively known as Martian Monkey
- Arnold Payne, candidate in Bulawayo Central (Parliament of Zimbabwe constituency)
