= List of Gladiators events =

List of Gladiators events cover sporting game events from the Gladiators TV franchise, which has had local versions broadcast in several countries since the 1990s.

== Events ==
There have been 35 events involving The Gladiators (as well as the Eliminator) across the incarnations. Four of the events have an alternate name in certain territories. A different selection of the events will be played in each episode. No single territory has had all thirty-five events on its roster. The UK had the largest number of events during its initial run with twenty-three events.

All events were created by either the American or UK series with the exception of Soccer Shootout in the South African version and Spidercage in the Swedish version. The UK notably adapted some of the American events, with the adaptations becoming the standard design for the concept. For example the UK version of Skytrack would later be adopted by the Australian and American revival series whereas the UK concept of the American event Tug-o-War, known as Tilt, eventually superseded Tug-o-War for the 2008 American revival and used in many of the 2020 revivals.

Over the course of the original UK and American series, several events were dropped, often due to safety reasons. The Eliminator was the only event which was played in every episode across every territory.

=== Second revivals ===
The following events made appearances during the revival series aired since 2024. All the new events, highlighted below, originated in the United Kingdom; the majority of which are based on or inspired by classic events from the original ITV series. Notably the German revival brought back the game Swingshot which had not been featured in any of the 2000s revivals.

Event	United Kingdom	Australia	France	Russia	Germany	United States
Atlaspheres	Yes (Note: Atlaspheres was reintroduced to the roster of events in the second series and inspired a new "sister-event" called Crash Course)			Yes		Yes
Breakthrough & Conquer						Yes
Collision	Yes		Yes	Yes		
Crash Course	Yes					Yes
Destruction	Yes					
Duel	Yes	Yes	Yes	Yes	Yes	Yes
Earthquake			Yes			
Eliminator	Yes	Yes	Yes	Yes	Yes	Yes
Everest	Yes					
Gauntlet	Yes		Yes	Yes	Yes	Yes
Hang Tough	Yes	Yes	Yes	Yes	Yes	
Powerball	Yes	Yes	Yes	Yes	Yes	Yes
Pyramid		Yes		Yes		
Snapback					Yes	
Sumo Ball					Yes	
Suspension Bridge	Yes (Note: In pre-production of the first series, an adaptation of the event named 'Battlebridge' was listed in the programme but ultimately dropped before filming. Suspension Bridge itself returned in the third series.)		Yes (Note: The event is referred to as 'Duel' despite Duel itself being in the event roster)			
Swingshot					Yes	
The Edge	Yes	Yes	Yes		Yes	Yes
The Ring	Yes		Yes	Yes	Yes	Yes
The Wall	Yes	Yes	Yes	Yes	Yes	Yes
Tilt		Yes	Yes (Note: The event was slightly modified so that both platforms were at the same height, similar to the US event Tug O War, though in keeping with the original event, both tables tilt forwards and backwards.)		Yes	
Unleash	Yes				Yes	Yes
Whiplash		Yes	Yes		Yes	Yes

=== First revivals ===
The various revivals in the 2000s and 2010s mostly used events previously seen during the show's original airing in that country.

Australia introduced UK events Pendulum, Sumo Ball and Vertigo for the first time and the United States introduced Hit & Run, Tilt and Vertigo. Snapback, whilst re-introduced to the US, had a completely different gameplay to previously and Skytrack would adopt the gameplay from the original UK and Australian series.

All the brand new events, highlighted below, for the revivals originated in the United States. Whilst Sideswipe only aired in the US, Rocketball would be used in the UK revival and Earthquake amongst almost all revivals.

Event	Arab League	Australia	Finland	Sweden	United Kingdom	United States
Assault/Danger Zone			Yes			Yes
Atlaspheres		Yes	Yes			Yes
Breakthrough			Yes			
Duel/Joust	Yes	Yes	Yes	Yes	Yes	Yes
Earthquake	Yes		Yes	Yes	Yes	Yes
Eliminator	Yes	Yes	Yes	Yes	Yes	Yes
Gauntlet	Yes	Yes	Yes	Yes	Yes	Yes
Hang Tough	Yes	Yes	Yes	Yes	Yes	Yes
Hit & Run	Yes	Yes	Yes	Yes	Yes	Yes
Pendulum		Yes				
Powerball	Yes	Yes	Yes	Yes	Yes	Yes
Pursuit					Yes	
Pyramid	Yes	Yes	Yes	Yes	Yes	Yes
Rocketball					Yes	Yes
Sideswipe						Yes
Skytrack						Yes
Snapback				Yes		Yes
Sumo Ball		Yes				
Suspension Bridge		Yes	Yes	Yes	Yes	
Swingshot			Yes			
Tilt						Yes
The Wall	Yes	Yes	Yes	Yes	Yes	Yes
Vertigo		Yes				Yes
Whiplash		Yes				

=== Original series ===
Event	Australia	Denmark	Finland	Nigeria	South Africa	Sweden	United Kingdom	United States
Assault/Danger Zone			Yes				Yes (Note: An adapted version of this event was played in the British children's spin-off, Gladiators: Train 2 Win)	Yes (Note: An adaptation of this event was played in the American children's spin-off, Gladiators 2000)
Atlaspheres	Yes		Yes		Yes	Yes	Yes	Yes
Breakthrough & Conquer			Yes				—N/a (Note: Breakthrough & Conquer was roadtested at the Wembley Live 1993 shows but was not taken forward for the televised series)	Yes
Catapult							Yes	
Cyclotron							—N/a (Note: Cyclotron was planned for the sixth series and appeared in the opening credits in CGI format. However problems persisted throughout pre production and the event was scrapped before making a televised appearance)	
Dogfight							Yes	
Duel/Joust	Yes	Yes	Yes	Yes	Yes	Yes	Yes	Yes
Eliminator	Yes	Yes	Yes	Yes	Yes	Yes	Yes	Yes
Gauntlet	Yes	Yes	Yes	Yes	Yes	Yes	Yes	Yes
Hang Tough	Yes		Yes		Yes	Yes	Yes	Yes
Hit & Run	Yes	Yes		Yes	Yes	Yes	Yes	
Human Cannonball								Yes (Note: Human Cannonball was axed mid way through series 2, was brought back for Series 4 before being retired)
Joust	Yes (Note: The apparatus of Joust was that from the UK series, which was shipped to Australia after the event was axed in the UK)						Yes (Note: Joust was retired following Series 4 due to consistent negative feedback)	
Pendulum/Rat Race	—N/a (Note: Pendulum was intended to be introduced to the Australian series should a fourth series have been commissioned)				Yes		Yes	
Pole-Axe							Yes (Note: Pole-Axe would be axed prior to filming of Series 5 after severe injuries to both a Gladiator and contender. The event would return in Series 6 in safer form)	
Powerball	Yes	Yes	Yes	Yes	Yes	Yes	Yes	Yes
Pursuit	Yes						Yes (Note: Pursuit would be retired following Series 5 for unspecified reasons)	
Pyramid	Yes	Yes				Yes	Yes (Note: Pyramid was axed prior to production on Series 5 following several severe injuries. It returned in a modified, safer version in Series 6 only to be axed again the following year)	Yes
Skytrack	Yes						Yes	Yes
Soccer Shootout				Yes	Yes			
Snapback		Yes				Yes (Note: Sweden had both versions of Snapback in their original series run)		Yes
Spidercage						Yes		
Sumo Ball		Yes				Yes	Yes	
Suspension Bridge	Yes	Yes		Yes	Yes	Yes	Yes	
Swingshot	Yes					Yes	Yes	Yes
The Maze								Yes (Note: The Maze was retired after Series 4)
The Wall	Yes	Yes	Yes	Yes	Yes	Yes	Yes	Yes
Tightrope						Yes	Yes	
Tilt	Yes					Yes	Yes (Note: Tilt was axed following Series 4 due to severe injuries)	
Tug O War								Yes
Vertigo							Yes	
Whiplash	Yes				Yes	Yes	Yes	Yes

== See also ==
- Gladiators (franchise)
- List of Gladiators UK events
- List of American Gladiators events
