= The București Experiment =

2013 film directed by Tom Wilson

The București Experiment is a 2013 Romanian film directed by British filmmaker Tom Wilson and starring Carmen Anton. It was winner of the Gopo Award for Best Long Documentary in 2014.
