= Thomas Wilson (cricketer, born 1849) =

English cricketer

Personal information
- Full name: Thomas Ward Wilson
- Born: 1 April 1849; Nocton, Lincolnshire, England
- Died: 4 January 1924 (aged 74); Broadstone, Dorset, England
- Batting: Right-handed
- Bowling: Right-arm roundarm medium-fast

Domestic team information
- Years: Team
- 1869–1871: Cambridge University

Career statistics
Competition	First-class
Matches	8
Runs scored	171
Batting average	15.54
100s/50s	–/1
Top score	50
Balls bowled	872
Wickets	17
Bowling average	17.88
5 wickets in innings	1
10 wickets in match	–
Best bowling	5/25
Catches/stumpings	1/–
- Source: Cricinfo, 5 August 2019

Thomas Ward Wilson (1 April 1849 – 4 January 1924) was an English first-class cricketer active 1869–1871 who played for Cambridge University. He was born in Nocton and died in Broadstone, Dorset. He appeared in eight first-class matches as a right-handed batsman who bowled fast or medium pace roundarm. Wilson scored 171 career runs with a highest score of 50; he held one catch and took 17 wickets with a best return of five for 25.
