= Matt Morsia =

British weightlifter and television personality

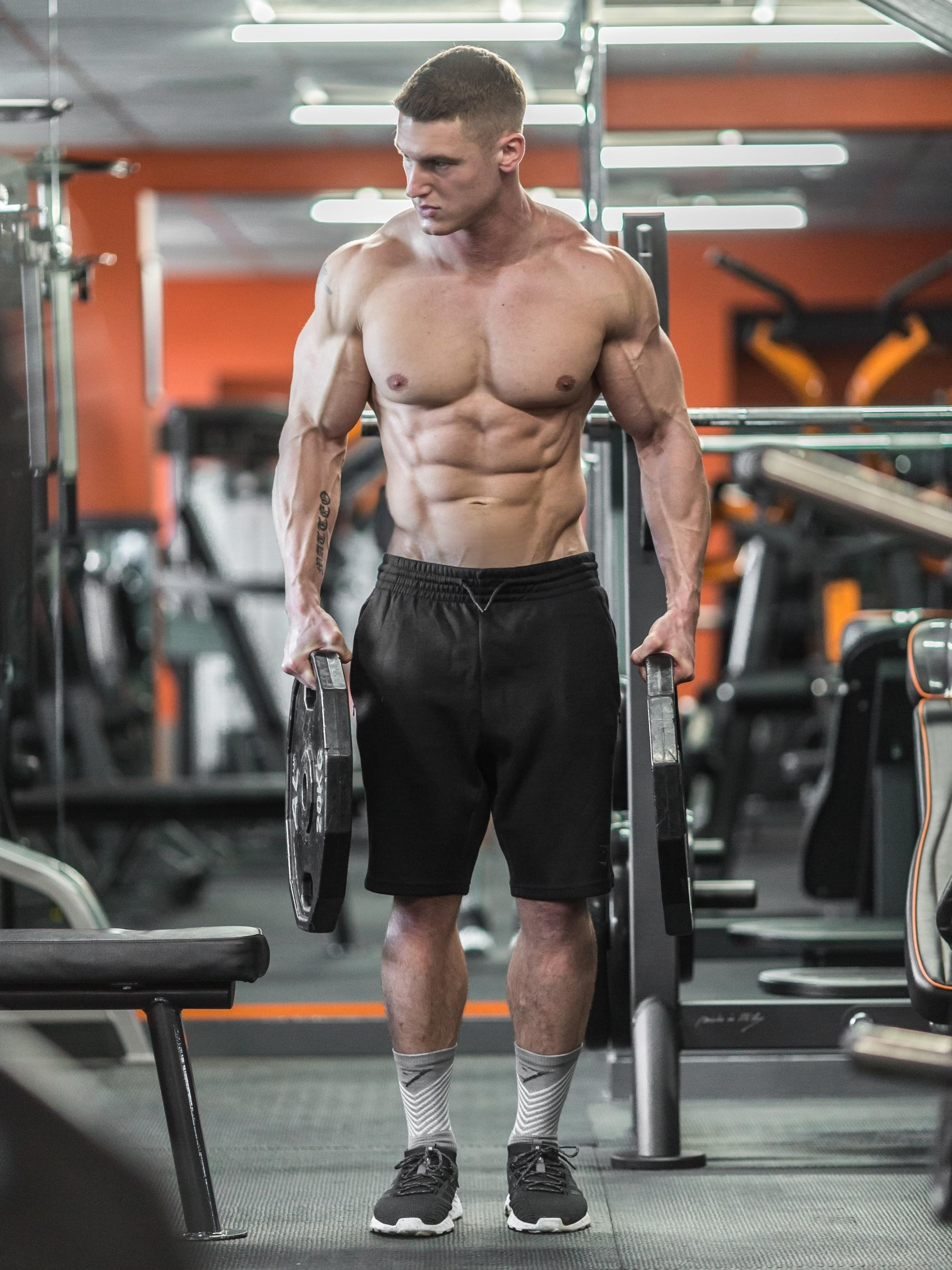

Personal information
- Nicknames: "MattDoesFitness" "Legend"
- Born: Matthew Morsia; 19 January 1986 (age 40) Barnet, Greater London, England
- Home town: Hythe, Kent, South East England, England
- Education: University of Kent
- Occupations: Bodybuilder; fitness influencer; television personality
- Height: 6 ft 1 in (185 cm)
- Weight: 96 kg (212 lb)
- Spouse: Sarah Morsia
- Children: 2

Sport
- Country: (United Kingdom) Great Britain
- Sport: Long and triple jump

Achievements and titles
- Personal bests: Long jump: 7.15; Triple jump: 15.13

Matthew Morsia (born 19 January 1986) is an English YouTuber, bodybuilder, fitness coach and television personality, known for appearing as Legend on the British sports game show Gladiators. He is a former track and field athlete and powerlifter, and is known by his social media profile "MattDoesFitness".

== Early life ==
Matthew Morsia, born on 19 January 1986, in Barnet, Southeast England, attended the University of Kent.

== Career ==
Morsia competed as an athlete in the long jump and the triple jump. He has described his early attempts at managing his body weight whilst competing as disordered eating. After suffering a stress fracture to his spine in 2012 he became a powerlifter. He won a silver medal at the European Championships in 2016.

In 2013 Morsia began building up an online fitness clientele using the moniker MattDoesFitness. By 2017 he was a PE teacher at Folkestone Academy. The success of his fitness coaching led him to leave his teaching job. In 2020 was given a YouTube Creator Award for gaining a million subscribers. The channel later had two and a half million subscribers. His book The 24/7 Body was published by Century in 2020.

In January 2024, he began appearing as "Legend" on British TV endurance sports game show Gladiators, where he is best known for his arrogant and self-obsessed character that has been popular with the show's viewers. Morsia's Legend has so far appeared to be one of the toughest male gladiators to face on the show, as he is described as the great "all-rounder", naming event The Edge as his favourite. He described the role as a "lifetime ambition", having been a huge fan of the original show when he was a child.

Whilst filming for the third series of Gladiators, Morsia suffered a major injury, as he tore his bicep off the bone, while tackling one contender in one of the events. Due to extensive surgery, he had to miss most of the series, but still appeared in some episodes briefly.

== Personal life ==
Morsia is roughly 6 feet 1 inch (1.85 m) tall and weighs 96 kilograms (212 lb). He is married to Sarah Morsia, and they have two sons, Luca and Mauro. They live in Hythe, Kent. He trains up to six days a week with bodybuilding and powerlifting.
