= List of Gladiators UK events =

This is a list of Gladiators UK events featured in the UK version of Gladiators.

== Original series events ==
The following events appeared during the original eight-year run of the UK series of Gladiators. In total there were 24 televised events with the Eliminator being the only event to appear in every episode.

The event line-up changed from series to series, with new events being added every series; however, over the years some events were dropped for safety reasons, and some never made it onto screen.

=== Atlaspheres ===
- First appearance: series 1, 1992 – heat 1

The first event ever shown on Gladiators in 1992. The two contenders and two Gladiators were enclosed in large spherical cages weighing around 220 kilograms (490 lb) that they had to propel from within. The contenders' task was to roll the atlasspheres onto any of the four scoring pods. When a pod was activated the score was registered by a plume of smoke and the contender scored 3 points. They were given 60 seconds to score as many points as they could in this fashion, whilst the Gladiators had to block the contenders from scoring. It was crucial that the contenders get the atlasphere into the dead-centre of a pod in order to score. This round holds the record for most objections where video replays demonstrated the referees had made the correct decision. Contenders were not allowed to score on the same pod twice unless they had already scored on or at least made an attempt on another since their last visit. Gladiators were not allowed to double-team a contender and could only keep them confined for ten seconds. The event's signature tune was "We Will Rock You" by Queen. The event was sometimes modified for celebrity specials, in which either two Gladiators faced three contenders, or three Gladiators faced three contenders from a standing start. From series 7 onwards, 2 contenders faced 3 Gladiators

The event returned for series 12 (BBC series 2). Instead of plumes of smoke coming from the pods, the floor display lights up red or blue depending on which contender rolled over it and each time this happened the contender scored 2 points. All other rules remained the same as the original version.

=== Catapult ===
- First appearance: series 7, 1998 – heat 4
- Last appearance: series 7, 1998 – quarter final 3

Two contenders faced two Gladiators. Each competitor was attached to a bungee cord and on the whistle they began to bounce up and down. The contenders scored 2 points by throwing balls into octagonal goals situated behind the Gladiators, whilst the Gladiators attempted to stop the contenders from scoring by blocking the goals. Each game lasted 60 seconds. The event had some modification to its gameplay between its initial concept and first outing, with the official 1998 programme mentioning a “volleyball-style net” situated between contenders and Gladiators. It was modified into the event that made it onto screen as this was deemed more exciting.

=== Danger Zone ===
- First appearance: series 1, 1992 – heat 1
- Last appearance: series 7, 1998 – quarter final 3

Contenders, one at a time, made their way across the arena whilst dodging tennis balls fired at high speed by a Gladiator. Between the start and finish were stations where the contender was shielded from the Gladiator's fire, and where they could attempt, using a projectile weapon, to hit a target above the Gladiator. Each of the stations self-destructed at ten-second intervals and their weapons were rendered unusable (a difference from the US version, named Assault, which did not have a limit). Successful shots on the target ended the game, earning the contender 10 points. However, contestants could still earn 5 points (10 points in series 1) by reaching the end of the course without being hit and touching a second, lower target. If the contender did not hit either the target above the Gladiator or reach the lower target, they were awarded 1 point for each weapon fired. If the contender was hit directly by a tennis ball (ricochets off the floor, station or weapon did not count), they were eliminated but would receive 1 point for each weapon fired.

=== Dogfight ===
- First appearance: series 7, 1998 – heat 1
- Last appearance: series 7, 1998 – semi-final 2

Contender and Gladiator were each strapped into an airship suspended 30 feet (9.1 m) above the arena floor. The aim was to hit the glowing chest plate on their opponent using a combat club. Two successful hits resulted in the loser being automatically released from their harness onto the safety net below. Each hit was registered by a pyro explosion. One hit from the contender earned 5 points, while sending the Gladiator flying within the 30-second time limit earned them 10. Decisions were frequently reviewed as the equipment did not always register direct hits. The event's signature tune was "Up in a Puff of Smoke" by Polly Brown.

=== Duel ===
- First appearance: series 1, 1992 – heat 1

Regarded by many as the signature event of Gladiators and known as Joust in the US series, a contender and a Gladiator were each placed atop an elevated platform a short distance apart. Armed with a pugil stick (often referred to as a giant cotton bud), they attempted to cause the other to fall from their platform within the 30-second time limit. This could be achieved with either an offensive or a defensive strategy, although some contenders automatically lost if they made no attacking move towards the Gladiator. If either competitor touched their opponent, their opponent's pugil stick or platform with anything other than the padded ends of their own pugil stick, this also led to an automatic loss as did losing a pugil stick. Contenders scored 10 points for knocking the Gladiator off or 5 points for remaining on their platform for the duration or, in some cases, if the Gladiator was found to have started just before the whistle before knocking the contender off. If a contender falls off, "Another One Bites the Dust" by Queen is played in the background.

The Sky series version of the event had the same rules and scoring system, but was played above water rather than crash mats.

The BBC version saw the return of the crash mats and it works similarly to the ITV version, although the platforms are both closer together and joined with a rigid bar, sometimes this would lead to someone to step or fall onto the opponent's platform causing the offender to lose.

=== The Eliminator ===
- First appearance: series 1, 1992 – heat 1

The final event, and the only event seen in every episode; this was a contender against contender obstacle course. The first contender to complete the Eliminator course would win the episode and progress to the next round. Unlike in the American version, the Gladiators would have no involvement with this round. Points gathered throughout the episode were used to determine a head start. For every point the contender with the higher score was ahead, 0.5 seconds would be added to their head start. Once a winner was determined, the runner-up was encouraged to finish the course anyway.

Each obstacle on the course had rules which were only explained to viewers if there was a potential violation, and if the referee was not satisfied that the contender crossed an obstacle properly, he could demand that they retake it.

The first obstacle was originally a cargo net with a steel slide and a scramble sheet. In series 2 this was replaced by high-and-low beams and a rope climb. The high-and-low beams were a set of four hurdles to scale; the high hurdles needing to be scaled while the low ones needed to be rolled under. In series 5, a new obstacle was placed between the high-and-low beams and the rope climb, called Spaghetti Junction which is a bungee maze where contenderes are required to climb through a series of elastic ropes. The second low hurdle was removed from the course to make room. In series 6, the Spaghetti Junction was replaced by a double-sided cargo net with a trampoline at its base; both sides needed to be scaled to pass.

After the scramble sheet/rope climb, contenders would cross from one platform to another; the females on a hand ladder while males used a hand bike; falling from these meant the contender had to wait for ten seconds before continuing. They then crossed to a third platform by running across rolling beams, which were replaced by two trapezes in series 6. After this, contenders would climb a vertical cargo net up to a gantry, where they would take a zip line down to a crash mat on the arena floor. Following this, they traversed a balance beam, which was introduced in series 2. During series 6, the single balance beam was replaced with two seesaws. Each had a teeter-totter mechanism; the contenders needed to negotiate the obstacle without falling off and had to make certain their feet touched a yellow mark at the end of each seesaw, though this was only a rule during the heats as from the quarter-finals onwards, the yellow mark was not included on the seesaws.

The final obstacle was the travelator, which was an incline into which two belts running toward the floor were installed. The object was to scale the ramp while running against the belts. When attempting the travelator, contenders were not allowed to use the covers on either side of the moving belt to help them get up. Once atop the travelator, contenders then grabbed a rope and used it to burst through a paper barrier to finish. When it was unclear which contender won, producers would watch a replay to determine who had torn the paper wall at the end first; in series 1, one heats Eliminator was declared a dead heat after replays, and both contenders entered onto the leaderboard for a place in the semi-finals, although neither ultimately progressed.

A new version was created for the Sky 1 series, and incorporated an underwater swim in the pool at the beginning. This feature caused contenders to become fatigued sooner, and being wet made some obstacles harder to overcome. As a result, the travelator would sometimes need to be slowed down or even stopped to help the contender finish the course. The order of obstacles in the rebooted series was as follows: underwater swim, cargo net, cotton reel (series 9 (Sky series 1) only), fireman's rope (series 9 (Sky series 1) only), floor travelator (series 10 (Sky series 2) only), monkey bars (women)/hand bike (men), balance beam, pyramid, zipline and travelator.

The BBC series' version of the Eliminator was similar to the original version, consisting of high-and-low beams (Two high hurdles and one low hurdle like the last four series of the ITV version), rope climb, monkey bars (For both genders unlike in prior versions which had monkey bars for female and hand bike for males), trapeze (Only one, unlike the last three series of the ITV version which had two), cargo net, zipline, balance beam, the travelator and the paperburst. For the 2024 New Year's Day celebrity special, the rope climb has knots and the monkey bars were replaced with a balance beam. The 2025 Christmas celebrity special onwards also altered the balance beam so that it dips in the middle, making it more difficult. Any red section on the beam must be touched or the contender will have to start again.

=== Gauntlet ===
- First appearance: series 2, 1993 – heat 6

A contender had to "run the gauntlet" by passing Gladiators armed with ramrods. Originally played with three Gladiators, Gauntlet became one of the staple events after a revamp in series 3 in which the contenders had to run a narrower gauntlet against five Gladiators, the second and fourth having power pads to slow the contenders down. Contenders were forbidden from crawling or grappling with the Gladiators or their equipment. In series 2, contenders scored 3 points for each zone completed, plus one bonus point for the fastest time. From the quarter-finals onward, they scored 10 points for the fastest time and 5 for second fastest. From series 3 to 6, 10 points were awarded for finishing in under 20 seconds and 5 points for under 30 seconds. In series 7 and 8, contenders scored 10 points for finishing, otherwise 1 point for each sector completed. Gladiators could only interact with the contender if they were in their designated zone, and had to cease the instant the contender had reached the white line marking the edge of that territory. Gladiators were also forbidden from holding and pinning the contenders, pushing them out of the gauntlet (in contrast to the American series, where this was allowed for no more than five seconds and would result in the contender losing the event), or even discarding their pads or ramrods.

In series 9 and 10 (Sky series 1 and 2), contenders scored 2 points for each Gladiator passed, plus a bonus 2 for breaking through the foam wall of bricks beyond the final Gladiator. There were stricter penalties for ducking and crawling under Gladiators, resulting in disqualification. The contenders were also further hindered by protective packs they were required to wear to house camera equipment. In the heats, contenders faced four Gladiators, but from the quarter-finals onwards, this was increased to five and a new unnamed weapon was featured. It was redesigned to help prevent the Gladiators' from pushing the contenders out of the chute, which now had barriers on the sides and a standing audience behind them.

In series 11 to 13 (BBC Series 1 to 3) the version of the event was similar in rules and scoring system to the Sky version, with 2 points per sector completed and 10 for a complete run. In series 1 contenders faced four Gladiators with 30 seconds in the heats and the quarter-finals to complete the Gauntlet. This was reduced down to 20 seconds in the semi-finals and the final (This change would be carried over to the next series). In series 12 (BBC series 2) the event was changed to include five Gladiators and a new weapon resembling the shape of a claw or bucket is introduced for the 4th Gladiator in line. In the Grand Final of Series 13 (BBC series 3), the time was reduced from 20 to 15 seconds.

=== Hang Tough ===
- First appearance: series 1, 1992 – heat 1

Contender and Gladiator begin on opposite sides of the arena, on raised platforms. Between them hangs a grid of suspended rings, similar to gymnastic rings. The contender's objective is to reach the Gladiator's platform within 60 seconds by traversing the rings, scoring 10 points if successful. The Gladiator meanwhile, swinging in the opposite direction, will attempt to prevent the contender from completing this task, usually by causing the contender to fall from the rings. Contenders were not allowed to try and make a Gladiator fall, or use their feet to impede the Gladiator. In addition, the contenders could not stay on any one ring for more than 10 seconds, unless they engage with the Gladiator. If the Gladiator fell, they were not allowed to interfere with the contender again. A contender still scored five points if they were holding onto a ring within the scoring zone, the area from a line of red rings halfway across the area to the Gladiator's platform, when the time limit expired (In the first series, the area was coloured blue). Contenders and Gladiators were not allowed to use either headlocks or tickling against each other, even though the latter happened frequently for comedic reasons. If a contender falls off, "Another One Bites the Dust" by Queen is played in the background.

Hang Tough returned in the Sky series with the same rules and scoring system, but now played above water rather than crash mats.

The 2024 BBC revival saw the crash mats return in Hang Tough, however, the event was dropped for the remainder of series 11 (BBC series 1) after an injury to Comet; but returned for series 12 (BBC series 2). All rings, and the chains they hang from, in the scoring zone are red, rather than just the demarcation line.

=== Hit & Run ===
- First appearance: series 3, 1994 – heat 5
- Last appearance: series 10, 2009 – "The Legends' Last Stand"

Originally known as Cannonball Run in its road test at the Wembley live shows, the contender had 30 seconds to run back and forth across a suspension bridge, scoring two points for each crossing. A crossing is only registered if they touch the backboard of the platform. Four Gladiators (two on each side of the bridge) attempted to knock the contender off by launching 4 feet (1.2 m) foam rubber demolition balls at them. Contenders were forbidden from crawling, holding onto a ball to avoid falling, standing still or moving backwards.

The event returned in the Sky series. The bridge was suspended above water and to register the crossing the contender had to touch a buzzer located on each platform. In series 10, contenders had a limited time after hitting each button to get to the other side. The time limit was eight seconds for female contenders and seven for male contenders. If the contender did not hit the button in time, a light went out and the crossing did not score any points. When a contender is knocked from the bridge, the Bananarama cover of Na Na Hey Hey Kiss Him Goodbye is played.

=== Joust ===
- First appearance: series 2, 1993 – heat 2
- Last appearance: series 4, 1995 – quarter final 1

A variation on Duel (which is known as Joust in the US series) in which contender and Gladiator were sat on sky bikes that twisted, bucked and spun like a rocking rodeo. Both participants had single-ended "combat clubs" with which they attempted to knock each other off. In the Wembley live shows, the bikes were large and only a few feet off the ground and contestants fought using pugil sticks. For the televised series, the bikes were made smaller, were further off the ground and combat clubs used. Contenders scored 10 points for knocking the Gladiator off or 5 points for remaining on the sky bike for the full 30 seconds. A significant majority of games ended in a time limit draw and this event was quickly phased out, making very few appearances before being axed after the 1995 series. It wasn't a popular event with fans. Many calling for it to be axed from its debut in series 2. After the events axing from the UK show the equipment was shipped to Australia and debuted during their versions third series.

=== Pendulum ===
- First appearance: series 4, 1995 – heat 2
- Last appearance: series 7, 1998 – final

The pendulum was a ball 5 metres in diameter, which hung from the ceiling of the arena, 40 feet (12 m) above the ground. The event was contender versus Gladiator in a chasing game of hide and seek and tag. On the command from the referee of “set the Pendulum” the ball would be set to the tune of "O Fortuna". On the whistle, the pendulum would begin to swing from side to side. The aim of the contender was to avoid the Gladiator, whose objective was to track the contender down and remove the Velcro tag from their back. Once this was done, the game was over. If the contender or Gladiator fell off, the remaining participant won. Contenders scored 10 points for remaining on the Pendulum for 60 seconds or 5 points for staying on for 40 seconds. If the contender was judged to be actively blocking the Gladiator from removing their tag, rather than trying to move away, the event was stopped. Both participants were forbidden from climbing above the red section at the top of the sphere, although this was largely for safety reasons as this took them near the swinging mechanism. In 1998, the rules were changed: the contender's objective was to hit 4 lit “sectors” in different positions around the pendulum, while still avoiding being caught by the Gladiator. Contenders could score 2 points for each of three upper sectors hit and 4 points for lower sector (for a maximum of 10 points).

Pendulum was originally planned to debut in the Sheffield live 1995 shows, but had to be dropped as the safety net was too big to fit in the arena. Instead, Joust was played.

=== Pole-Axe ===
- First appearance: series 3, 1994 – heat 8
- Last appearance: series 7, 1998 – semi-final 1

A contender and Gladiator each climbed a 36-foot (11 m) pole fitted with helically-arranged pegs. The poles also rotated on the referee's command. The first to the top pressed a button that retracted the pegs on the opponent's pole, causing them to fall to the crash mat below. If the contender beat the Gladiator, they would score 10 points. If the contender fell off at any point, they lost. The rules required the contender to reach their button to score points even if the Gladiator fell off before the contender did, though no Gladiator ever fell off by mistake.

This event was dropped in 1996 because of injuries to both Gladiators and contenders. Most noticeably to Zodiac who made only 2 appearances during series 5 and later had to retire from the show. It returned in 1997 with safety harnesses to stop the "freefall" aspect. This also enabled a run-up before mounting the pole and meant a higher and longer climb.

=== Powerball ===
- First appearance: series 2, 1993 – heat 1

This cross between basketball and rugby in which 2 contenders faced 3 Gladiators on the Powerball pitch. Contenders had 60 seconds to place balls in the five scoring baskets on the pitch (2 points for a score in one of the four outer baskets and 3 points for the middle) whilst the Gladiators had to tackle the contenders, preventing them from scoring (though head-high tackles and similar moves were illegal for safety reasons and would result in the Gladiator being disqualified). A Gladiator could not touch a contender until they had stepped into the indicated zone on the mat. If any part of the contender or the ball touched the floor, the ball become invalid and could not be used to score. Before continuing, the contender was required to get a ball from the other container. If a Gladiator deliberately moved a scoring basket or blocked the opening, the affected player would be awarded the lost points after the game. This event became one of the most played events during Gladiators. From 1998 onwards, the rules were changed: there were only two Gladiators and each one targeted a specific contender. The signature tune for the female Gladiators was "We Are Family" by Sister Sledge and later "Sisters Are Doin' It for Themselves" by Eurythmics. The song used for the male Gladiators was "The Boys Are Back in Town" by Thin Lizzy and later "Let's Get Ready to Rhumble" by PJ & Duncan. If Wolf and Vulcan played together, "Bad Boys" by Inner Circle would be used.

In series 9 and 10 (Sky series 1 and 2), the centre basket was worth 5 points.

The BBC revival returned to three Gladiators and three points for the centre basket.

=== Pursuit ===
- First appearance: series 3, 1994 – heat 7
- Last appearance: series 10, 2009 – semi-final 2

Two contenders raced against each other over an obstacle course, chased by two Gladiators. The course comprised a snake beam, wire bridge, hand ladder, two web traps, a high and low wall and a sprint finish. The course was rearranged for series 4 onwards, with one set of apparatus recoloured white rather than both being red, and the rules were tightened up with penalty points being introduced for stepping off the beam or missing rungs on the hand ladder. Initially, Gladiators could catch the contenders by simply touching ("tagging") them, from series 4 they needed to remove a tag from the contender's back before they reached the finish line. Gladiators were expected to run the obstacles in exactly the same way that the contenders did. If they tagged a contender without doing this, the Gladiator would be disqualified and the contender awarded five points. Contenders scored 10 points for finishing the course first, 5 points for finishing second.

During Series 10 (Sky series 2), the obstacle course featured the over & under hurdles, monkey bars, snake beams, two walls, and a swim across the pool to the finish podium. Two points for completing the monkey bars, four for reaching the first wall, and ten for finishing the course. But get caught by a gladiator, and you score only the points you have banked.

=== Pyramid ===
- First appearance: series 3, 1994 – heat 2
- Last appearance: series 10 – champion of champions episode, 2009

Two contenders would race up a giant black-and-white pyramid with steps 2 feet (0.61 m) in height. The aim for the contenders was to reach the summit, the aim of the Gladiators was to stop them. Each contender would have a Gladiator assigned to them. The Gladiator was not permitted to touch the contender until they had passed the second step. While the contenders started on different sides of the pyramid, they were not required to stay on their own side and had free run of the entire Pyramid. This event was dropped in 1996 after Jet was badly injured in the Sheffield live shows, causing her retirement from Gladiators. Youdale later revealed that she compressed her spinal cord, and narrowly avoided breaking her neck. It was reintroduced in series 6 with smaller steps which increased in height the further up the pyramid you got. A new “red step” was brought in which, once reached, meant the contender had free run to the top. However, it wasn't popular with viewers because it lacked the excitement of the original and consequently it was axed again for series 7.

The event returned in series 9 and 10 (Sky series 1 and 2), and in series 10, a new three point zone was introduced on the sixth step. Three points if the contender was in the scoring zone after time expires. Also, gladiators could not tackle a contender below the second step.

=== Skytrak ===
- First appearance: series 2, 1993 – heat 1
- Last appearance: series 7, 1998 – heat 7

Two contenders and two Gladiators were suspended 40 feet (12 m) in the air on the Skytrak course – an upside down Scalextric-style figure of eight. Contenders had a 10 yards (9.1 m) head start over the Gladiators. Each contender had a trailing detonator button behind them, and was caught if the Gladiator pressed this button. Should this happen, a small pyrotechnic explosion was released from the contender's backpack. Contenders scored 10 points for finishing first and 5 points for finishing second, but no points if caught by the Gladiator.

=== Sumo Ball ===
- First appearance: series 5, 1996 – Northern heat 2
- Last appearance: series 7, 1998 – quarter final 3

The only new game for series 5 and first road-tested in the 1996 live shows, the contender and Gladiator were positioned on a circular platform in which a large red sumo ball hung from the ceiling. Both participants had 30 seconds to push the opponent off the platform using the 75 kilograms (165 lb) ball. Both participants were required to hold unto a rope on the ball. Releasing this rope would result in an automatic DQ. Contenders scored 10 points if they pushed the Gladiator off the platform or 5 points for remaining on the platform for the full 30 seconds.

=== Suspension Bridge ===
- First appearance: series 2, 1993 – heat 1

An adaption of the Duel event in which the contender must cross a suspension bridge. They were armed with a hammerhead, and were impeded by a Gladiator with the same. For most of the series, if the contender knocked a Gladiator off, this was an automatic win. However, in series 3, the contender was not required to knock the Gladiator off the bridge, was not rewarded for doing so and if the Gladiator fell, the round continued until the contender had reached the Gladiator's platform or the time limit had expired. The time limit in series 2 and 3 was 60 seconds, and was reduced to 30 seconds from series 4 to 7 along with reinstating the automatic win for a Gladiator fall. Contenders scored 10 points for reaching the opposite platform and 5 points for remaining on the bridge until the end of the time limit, if the Gladiator landed first if both them and the contender fall off, or (as seen in the 2024 revival) if the Gladiator breaks the rules in any way.

The event returned in series 10 (Sky series 2) albeit with ramrods (from Gauntlet) used as weapons. Due to the longer length of the bridge and the change of weaponry, the event tended to see participants push rather than actually fight.

During pre-production of series 11 (BBC series 1), an adaptation of the event, named "Battle Bridge", was listed in the show's official booklet but was ultimately dropped before filming. Suspension Bridge itself will return in the third series, filmed in 2025 and due to broadcast in 2026, with a return to the original game play and hammerheads. This time around, there's no time limit, so it's either 10 points for the contender if they win, otherwise zero if they either get knocked off or lose their hammerhead. The theme for this version is "Tubthumping" by Chumbawamba, which is heard if the contender is knocked off.

=== Swingshot ===
- First appearance: series 1, 1992 – heat 1
- Last appearance: series 8, 2000 – final

In this event, contestants started on a platform and were harnessed onto bungee ropes. Suspended above the arena was a column with coloured balls affixed to it, the lowest balls were yellow (worth 1 point each), the middle balls blue (2 points) and the higher balls red (3 points). The objective of the game was for the contenders to jump from their platform to the floor, bouncing up to the suspended column and grabbing balls to place in a basket atop their platform. Gladiators were positioned on opposite platforms and would time their jumps to block the contenders. Balls only counted if the contender successfully placed them in their basket before the 60 second time limit had expired, and any ball that had touched the arena floor could not be used to score points. In the first two series, only one ball could legitimately be taken per swing; But from series 3 onwards, contenders could grab as many balls as they could for each swing.

=== Tightrope ===
- First appearance: series 6, 1997 – heat 1
- Last appearance: series 7, 1998 – final

The only new event of series 6 after “Cyclotron” was dropped from the events roster during filming. A one-on-one event where the contender and Gladiator are harnessed up to the “Tightrope” 30 feet (9.1 m) above the arena floor. On the whistle they race up the inclining rope to the halfway platform. Once there they hit a button to activate a zip Line (the zip line would not be activated if the button was not hit, although this never happened.) The aim then is to them grab the zip line and slide back down to hit the impact cushion at the end, therefore winning the event and sending their opponent flying to the net below as their zip line disconnected in a pyro explosion. The contender would score 10 points for beating the Gladiator.

=== Tilt ===
- First appearance: series 2, 1993 – heat 1
- Last appearance: series 4, 1995 – heat 8

An tug-of-war in which both contender and Gladiator were on tilting platforms. The contender was placed on a lower platform and the Gladiator on a higher platform. Because of the height difference in platforms, Gladiators were able to use their platform to their advantage to make the task harder for the contender. Two 30-second bouts were played, and contenders would score 5 points for pulling the Gladiator off, or 2 points for remaining on their platform until the end of the time limit (except in series 4, where there were no points for a draw due to damage to the equipment used). This event wasn't popular with the Gladiators due to the risk of injury and the clear advantage initially given to the contender. The tilting of the platforms often caused competitors to fall awkwardly. If either competitor released the rope or fell off a platform, the sudden loss of tension would cause their opponent to fall unexpectedly. Due to the higher height of the Gladiator's platforms, they were at greater risk of injury. After both Panther and Nightshade suffered serious injuries because of this event, it was axed after series 4. Tilt became the basis for the American Gladiators event Tug-O-War, which debuted in US series 5 (which aired after the UK series 2), safer due to the platforms being at the same height with each other. Players could only score points if the flag was on their side within the 30 seconds.

=== Vertigo ===
- First appearance: series 7, 1998 – heat 1
- Last appearance: series 7, 1998 – final

Vertigo was a one-on-one race between contender and Gladiator across five 27 feet (8.2 m) “sway” poles. On the whistle contender and gladiator climbed the first pole to the top. Once at the top, they swung their pole and used momentum to transfer across to the next pole. They had to complete a left-to-right swing before transferring. Directly leaning over to the next pole is not allowed. The aim is to traverse all five poles until the end where a suspended silver ring awaited, the first to grab this won the event in a shower of sparks. Contenders scored 10 points for reaching the end ring first, if not, they get 1 point for each pole completed.

=== The Wall ===
- First appearance: series 1, 1992 – heat 1

Contenders attempted to climb up a 36 feet (11 m) climbing wall covered with hand and foot holds while the Gladiators gave chase, and attempted to pull them off. There were two separate Walls - the version the females used had one overhang; the male version had two. In the BBC revival, the Walls were reduced to 30 feet (9.1 m) tall, and did not feature the ridges or overhangs of the originals. However, they were also used as projection screens outside of the event.

In the first series, the female contenders received a 20-second head-start, falling to 15 seconds in the semi-finals and final; while the men received a 15-second head-start falling to 10 seconds in the semi-finals and final. In later series, the head-starts were standardised at 10 seconds for female contenders and 7 seconds for the male contenders. In series 1 and the series 2 heats, contenders received 10 points for reaching the top of The Wall; from the series 2 quarter-finals onward this was changed to 10 points for reaching the top first and 5 points for reaching the top second. Contenders could also score 5 points if they remained on The Wall at the end of the 60-second time limit.

In the Grand Final of series 12 (BBC series 2), one of the Gladiators (Legend, in this case) changed the rules to make each contender race their respective Gladiator to the top of the Wall, with 10 points rewarded for the contender if they got to the top first or 5 points if they lost but reached the top within the 20 second time limit. If the contender fell off The Wall before the Gladiator was released, they were allowed to try again. However, if the contender fell after the Gladiator started climbing, it would be a loss. The Gladiator was allowed as many tries as necessary. A win was only counted if the contender got their entire body over the wall within the time limit. Contenders were not allowed to try and remove the Gladiators or their opponents from the wall. Gladiators were forbidden from touching the contenders' harness equipment or necks. In the BBC version touching the harness is now allowed.

=== Whiplash ===
- First appearance: series 4, 1995 – heat 1
- Last appearance: series 8, 1999 – "Battle of the Giants"

Taken from series 5 of the American version in 1993, this is a tug-of-war game in which contender and Gladiator grip a "dog bone" and the contender had to use this to pull the Gladiator out of the ring or to obtain the "dog bone". No wrenching or pulling was permitted on the Gladiator's part, their role was strictly defence; however, the contender could use any means to remove the Gladiator. The "dog bone" was changed in later seasons and was designed to keep both contender and Gladiator from letting go and making for more exciting bouts. Contenders would score 10 points for pulling the Gladiator out of the ring within the 30-second time limit. (The American series 7 rule for a draw was not used.)

=== Unused events ===
Two events were planned, even appearing in the opening titles, but never made it to any televised series.

==== Breakthrough & Conquer ====
This two-part event (based on the event of the same name in the American series) was road-tested in the 1993 Wembley live shows, but it was never played in any televised series (although clips of it were shown in the series 2 opening show).

For the first part of the event, the contender, armed with a rugby ball, had to get past a Gladiator without being tackled, gaining 5 points if successful. Any foul by a Gladiator (illegal strike to the head, not in the five-yard zone, etc.) also was an automatic win. For the second part, the contender was placed in a small circle against a different Gladiator and had 30 seconds to remove the Gladiator from the circle, again receiving 5 points should they be successful.

==== Cyclotron ====
This event was due to appear as a new event in the 1997 series along with Tightrope, even appearing (as a CGI image) in the opening credits.

Gameplay appeared to involve both contender and Gladiator on cycles on a rotating circular track. It appeared that the Gladiator was to chase the contender with the aim of catching them. The reason for Cyclotron's removal from the events roster is unknown, although it is rumoured that it was due to technical problems and certain Gladiators commented on it being too difficult to play and very hard for the audience to follow.

== Sky One series events ==
These events were added in Sky's revival of the series in 2008.

=== Earthquake ===
- First appearance: series 9, 2008 – heat 2
- Last appearance: series 10, 2009 – "The Legends' Last Stand"

The contender and Gladiator were situated on a circular platform suspended above crash mats, which is free to tilt slightly. The contender and Gladiator attempted to throw each other off the platform. If the contender threw the Gladiator off, they scored 10 points, and could score 5 points for remaining on the platform at the end of the 30 second time limit. The theme for being knocked out was Boom! Shake the Room.

When the event was first shown, several warnings were issued by the referee to both contenders and Gladiators for wrestling, not allowing the other to get up after being pushed down on the platform, deliberatley staying down on the ground, and for holding onto the supporting wires. In one episode, the referee stated that competitors were only allowed to push against their rival's arms, but this rule was never enforced beyond that occasion. The event continued to be plagued by stop-start calls due to vague interpretations of the rules. In series 10 (Sky series 2) the platform was higher up in the studio and the fall was onto a net instead of crashmats. The prohibition on wrestling was removed, as it was leading to too many interruptions.

=== Rocketball ===
- First appearance: series 10, 2009 – heat 1
- Last appearance: series 10, 2009 – “The Legends Last Stand”

Effectivley Swingshot in reverse, contenders and Gladiators were attached to harnesses and push buttons to be launched into the air. Contenders attempted to throw balls into a lower white basket (worth 1 point each) or upper yellow basket (worth 2 points). The Gladiators attempted to block the goals. This event was unique in UK Gladiators as it lasted 90 seconds, the longest time limit of any game.

== BBC One series events ==
The following new events have been added in the BBC One's 2024 revival.

=== Collision ===
- First appearance: series 11, 2024 – heat 1

This game is based on the earlier "Hit and Run" event, but this time the giant balls are replaced with four of the Gladiators themselves. The Gladiators' mission is to prevent the Contender from crossing the bridge by launching themselves towards the Contender from the side platforms and knock this off. For every time the contender successfully manages to cross, and returns a ball to a basket, they are awarded two points. The Gladiators are allowed to just knock off the Contender off the bridge by swinging towards them, but not allowed to get their legs to "scissors hold" and grab them off, neither are they allowed to leave their trapezes when swinging. Just like in the "Hit and Run" event, the Contenders must keep moving upon crossing the bridge, as stopping for too long leads to either a 2-point penalty or disqualification.

The signature theme for this event is "Jungle Boogie" by Kool & the Gang, the opening section of which plays if a contender is knocked off the bridge.

=== Crash Course ===
- First appearance: series 12, 2025 – quarter-final 2

This event is a modification of classic event Atlaspheres, in which the contenders are sent off in their Spheres side-by-side, and they have to navigate around the arena floor to the finish line while two Gladiators are trying to impede their progress in their own Spheres. Gladiators are limited to specific “zones” and are not permitted to impede/attack outside of these areas. 10 points to the contender who makes it to the finish first after two laps, and 5 points for the second if they finish within 10 seconds of the first contender, otherwise no points are scored. This is sometimes called Atlaspheres: Crash Course since the game uses the same Atlaspheres.

=== Destruction ===
- First appearance: series 13, 2026 – heat 1

In this event, the two contenders face one Gladiator in a race to hit a button in the center of the arena. They must first break through four 8 feet (2.4 m) high barriers, each with their own unique way to get through: The first barrier is a straight run through, the second barrier must be broken using a battering ram, the third barrier is conquered by climbing over but first the participant must punch and kick handholds/footholds to do so and the fourth barrier is the toughest of all which takes several “charges” to get through. If the contenders reach the button first, the first to hit the button gets 10 points (even if the Gladiator came second), while the second contender will claim 5. If the Gladiator wins, the first contender to hit the button wins 5 points while the second contender gains no points regardless if the Gladiator came first or second. This became the first event in UK Gladiators history to be a 1 Gladiator against 2 contenders with at least 1 contender guaranteed to score.

=== The Edge ===
- First appearance: series 11, 2024 – heat two

Contender and Gladiator are raised 30 feet (9.1 m) off the arena floor on a criss-cross grid of one-metre wide walkways. Contender and Gladiator start on opposite platforms, and the aim for the contender is to reach the opposite platform as many times as possible, without being knocked off "the edge" or through the middle by the Gladiator. From the heats to the quarter-finals, each successful crossing of the grid was worth three points and contenders could cross a maximum of six times, meaning there's an available maximum of 18 points. From the semi-finals of series 11 (BBC series 1) each crossing was worth two points; after five successful crossings from the contender, the game ends meaning the maximum now available was 10 points. This scoring format was carried over into subsequent series.

If the Gladiator either falls or is knocked off during the normal course of play but the contender is still standing they must keep making crossings until the maximum score is made. As evidenced in the first Semi Final, if a Gladiator sustains an injury during the event (Sabre in this instance), the contender is automatically awarded the full points.

The signature theme for this event is either the riff from The Score's "Legend" (in series 1) or Skepta's "Shutdown" (series 2 onward), which play if the contender (and sometimes along with the Gladiator) falls into the net after going off the Edge.

=== Everest ===
- First appearance: series 13, 2026 – heat 2

Suspended 21 feet (6.4 m) above the arena floor, both the contender and the Gladiator are positioned on a 10 metres (33 ft) long platform. Between them stands a 220 kilograms (490 lb) Perspex barrier, reinforced with a steel frame. The aim of the event is to push your opponent off the platform using the barrier. The twist is the platform will tilt from side to side during the course of the event, first in the contender's favour, then the Gladiator's. 10 points are awarded if the contender defeats the Gladiator, 5 points if no one falls. the Gladiator each of the contender faces is chosen at random by a roulette selector projected onto the Wall prior to the event.

The signature theme for this event is "Push It" by Salt-n-Pepa, which plays regardless of a win or loss.

=== The Ring ===
- First appearance: series 11, 2024 – heat 1
- Last appearance: series 12, 2025 – quarter final 3

In this event reminiscent of classic event Powerball, two contenders and two gladiators go face to-face in a large "ring" on the arena floor. In the centre of the ring is a circular button. The aim is for the contender to bypass the gladiator and hit the button. Every successful hit is worth two points. The gladiator may tackle the contender to the floor but once down they must release the contender within 2 seconds. Once the contender has made a successful hit on the button they must go to the outer boundary of the ring to restart. The event has a 60 second time-limit. The event uses state of the art floor projection technology.

The Ring is not featured in series 13 (BBC series 3), despite being in the recordings official programme. The "button" of the Ring is however used in one of the brand-new events of the series, Destruction.

=== Unleash ===
- First appearance: series 12, 2025 – heat 3

On the referees whistle, the contender starts running around the 110 metres (120 yd) unleash track. On the way round they encounter some obstacles. A small hurdle first and then a wall made of blocks further on. The aim is to reach the end of the track, climb the stairs and grab the suspended "G" flag. However, after three seconds, a Gladiator is released, their sole aim is to catch the contender before they can grab the flag. In a Gladiators first, the contender doesn't know which Gladiator they are facing, as they come from a tunnel behind the start line. 10 points are awarded if they manage to capture the flag, 5 points if they complete the course but do not grab the flag. If any rule breaks occur on either the contender's or Gladiator's part, these scores are accounted for in the respective cases. No points are scored if the contender is caught by the Gladiator. One specific rule that was enforced was that the stairs must be taken one step at a time. In the Grand Final of Series 13 (BBC series 3), the countdown was reduced from three seconds to two.

The signature theme for this event is "The Next Episode" by Dr. Dre, which plays if the contender is caught by the Gladiator.

== See also ==
- Lists of Gladiators events
