= Lystus Ebosele =

Irish powerlifter (born 2001)

Personal information
- Nickname: Cyclone
- Nationality: Irish
- Born: 9 February 2001 (age 25) Enniscorthy, County Wexford, Ireland
- Occupations: Powerlifter; television personality
- Height: 5 ft 10 in (178 cm)
- Weight: 96 kg (212 lb)

Sport
- Country: (Republic of Ireland) Ireland
- Sport: Powerlifting
- Event: 84+ kg

Achievements and titles
- Personal best(s): Squat (raw) 240 kg (518 lb); Deadlift 227.5 kg (501.5 lb)

Lystus Ebosele (born 9 February 2001) is an Irish powerlifting champion. She won a gold medal at 84+ junior weight category at World Powerlifting Championships 2023. While training for the 2024 Arnold Classics, she has managed to raw squat 240 kilograms (518 lbs) "for a Double". She also has the role "Cyclone" in the BBC sports entertainment show Gladiators.

== Early life and career ==
Lystus Ebosele was born on 9 February 2001 in Enniscorthy, County Wexford, Ireland. She became the Junior European Champion in the European Powerlifting Federation in 2022, and took the International Powerlifting Federation (IPF) Junior world title in the 84+ weight-class in Romania in 2023. In addition to powerlifting, Ebosele also competed in shot put events as a teenager.

In 2025, Ebosele debuted on the British TV endurance sports show Gladiators as "Cyclone", becoming the "first-ever Irish Gladiator". She joined the show in the "heats" stage of the second series, saying: "I've got the look, I've got the energy and I've got the muscles".

== Personal life ==
Ebosele is 5 ft 10 in tall, and weighs around 95–96 kg. Her brother is the Irish professional association footballer Festy Ebosele.
