= Martian Monkey =

Hoax (1953)

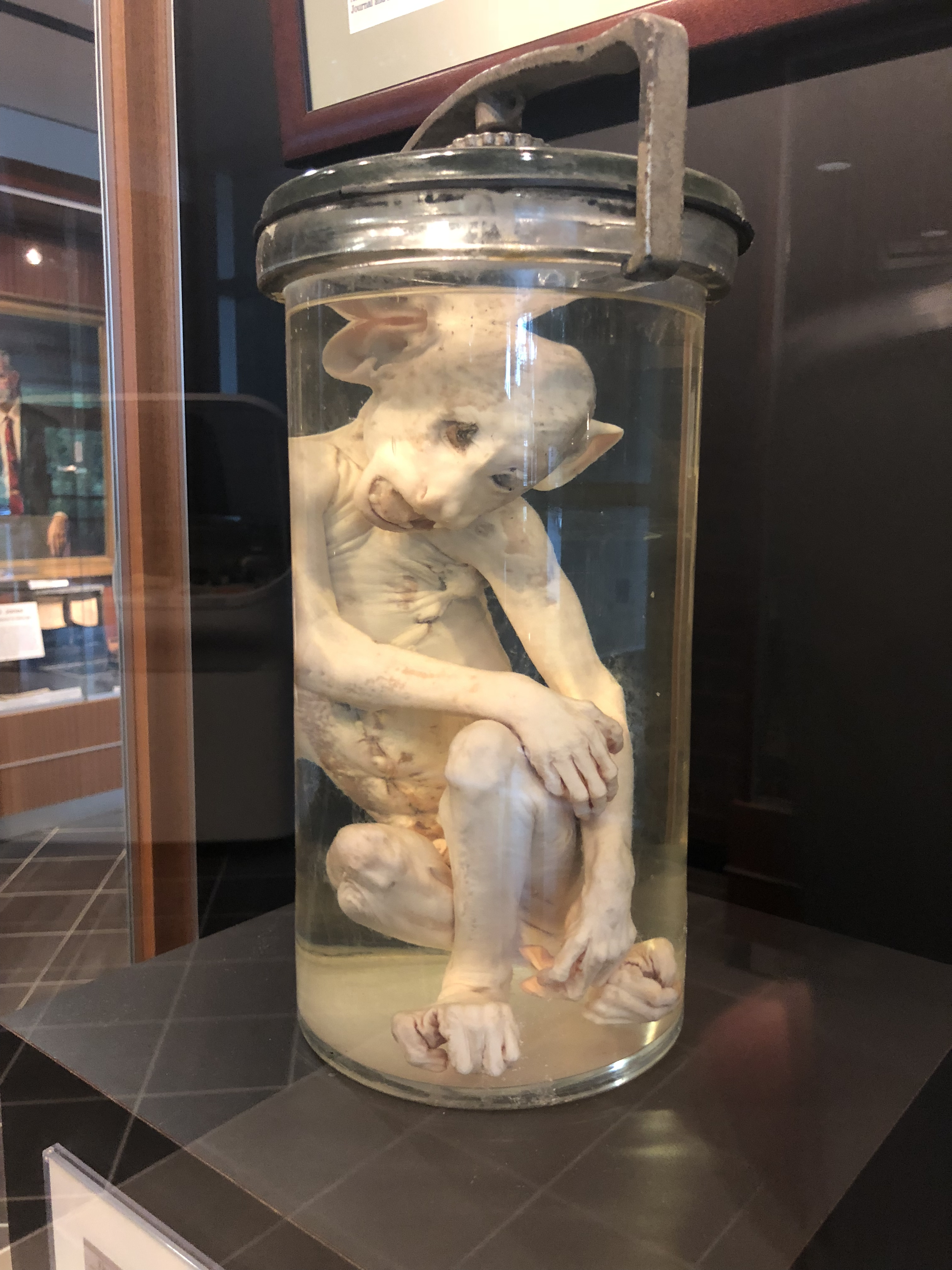
The monkey on display at GBI headquarters

The Martian Monkey is the name given to the monkey used by Edward Watters, Tom Wilson and Arnold Payne to perpetrate a hoax in Atlanta, Georgia, in 1953.

== The hoax ==
In 1953, young Atlanta barbers Edward Watters and Tom Wilson, along with butcher Arnold Payne, took a dead rhesus monkey and removed its tail, applied large doses of hair remover and used green food coloring to make the corpse of the monkey appear abnormal. They then used a blow torch to create a burning circle in the pavement. On July 8, 1953, Officer Sherley Brown came across the scene by accident and was told by the hoaxers that they had seen many creatures just like it. They claimed that they had hit the dead one with their truck and the other creatures had left in their flying saucer, which is what caused the scorch marks.

The prank was played at the height of UFO hysteria in the United States. As a result, the Atlanta Police Department received constant phone calls after news of the story broke, with multiple residents adamant they had seen the flying saucer that the pranksters described. The situation was propelled further when a veterinarian agreed that the animal was not from Earth. The United States Air Force was also called in to investigate.

== Hoax revealed ==
The hoax was discovered hours after the event by Herman Jones and Emory University anatomy professor Marion Hines. They found that the anatomy of the creature was identical to that of a monkey and Hines is quoted as saying "If it came from Mars, they have monkeys on Mars."

Wilson, Payne and Watters eventually admitted to the hoax. Watters was made to pay a $40 fine "for obstructing a highway."

== Present day ==
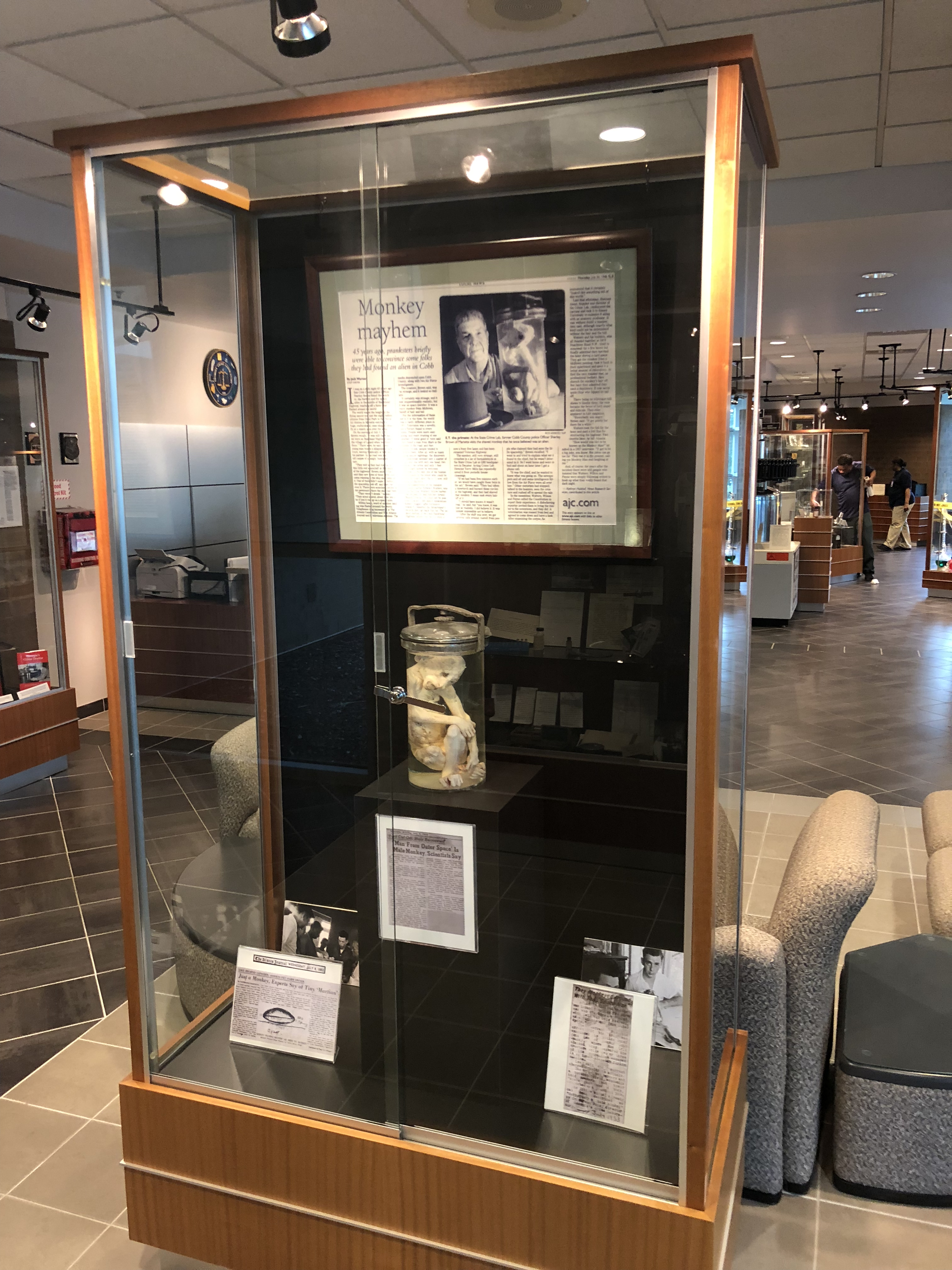
The display at GBI

The Martian Monkey is now on display in the Georgia Bureau of Investigation mini-museum, along with other notable items, such as an illegal moonshine still and the fibers that solved the Atlanta child murders. The exhibit is showcased along with the news report that was published at the time.

== In the media ==
Nate DiMeo retold this story in "Every Night Ever", episode 67 of his podcast The Memory Palace.

The story was featured in season 6, episode 8 of the Travel Channel show Mysteries at the Museum.
