= Tom Wilson (rower) =

British indoor rower (born 1992)

Personal information
- Nickname: Hammer
- Nationality: British
- Born: Thomas Jack Wilson; 11 March 1992 (age 34) Nottingham, East Midlands, England
- Occupations: Indoor rower; personal trainer; television personality
- Height: 6 ft 6 in (198 cm)
- Weight: 18 st 5 lb (257 lb; 117 kg)
- Spouse: Chelsea Atkin (2026–present)

Sport
- Country: (United Kingdom) Great Britain
- Sport: Indoor rowing

Thomas Jack Wilson (born 11 March 1992) is a British Indoor rowing champion and personal trainer who won the 2024 British Indoor Rowing Championships. He has also placed 2nd in European, and World Championships in 2023. He has the role "Hammer" in the BBC sports entertainment game show Gladiators.

Thomas Jack Wilson was born in Nottinghamshire, England, in March 1992. He attended the present St Peter's Church of England Junior School. Representing his hometown of Nottingham, he secured the silver medal in World Rowing Indoor Championships in February 2024, held in Prague, Czechia.

In 2025, Wilson, standing at 6 feet 6 inches (1.98 m) and weighing roughly 19 stone (270 lb; 120 kg), was named as one of the new Gladiators for the second series of the hit UK endurance sports show, taking the brute moniker "Hammer". Upon joining the show in the quarter finals, he described himself as "Hard hitting, powerful, quick, explosive and surprising". He said his build "sets him apart from everyone else".

Outside of the rowing boat, Wilson is also a personal trainer, and has gained following on his Instagram, where he shares exercise tips as well as updates from his personal life. Wilson was engaged to his fiancée Chelsea Atkin in May 2023. Wilson and Atkin married in September 2026.
