= American Gladiators (2008 TV series) season 2 =

Season of American reality television series

American Gladiators
- Season 2
- Hosted by: Hulk Hogan; Laila Ali
- No. of contestants: 40
- Winners: Tim Oliphant; Ally Davidson
- No. of episodes: 12

Release
- Original network: NBC
- Original release: April 12 – August 4, 2008

Season chronology
- ← Previous; Season 1

The second season of the 2008 American Gladiators revival premiered on April 12, 2008, and concluded on August 4 of the same year, airing on NBC in the United States and Citytv in Canada.

== Format ==
Season 2 of the revival featured 40 contenders (20 male, 20 female) as opposed to the first season featuring 24 (12 male, 12 female). Men and women compete in separate tournaments, with two men and two women competing in each episode. In each episode, contenders take part in several events against the Gladiators, trying to earn as many points as possible before the final event, the Eliminator. Each point separating the contenders translates into a half-second advantage for the leader (or a half-second handicap for the trailing contender). Preliminary round matches consisted of six events plus the Eliminator (by comparison, the original series had either six or seven events plus the Eliminator). However, during the two-hour season premiere, the contenders only participated in four events before competing in the Eliminator in both heats.

The six male contenders and the six female contenders who won their respective preliminary matches with the fastest Eliminator times advanced to the semifinals. Unlike the first season, there are now three semifinal rounds, and only the two winning male and two winning female contenders with the fastest Eliminator times qualify for the finals.

The grand prize was $100,000 and a 2008 Toyota Sequoia.

== Gladiators ==
=== Returning Gladiators ===
Females			Males		
Gladiator Name	Birth Name	Height & Weight	Gladiator Name	Birth Name	Height & Weight
Crush	Gina Carano	5'8", 150 lbs (1.70 m, 68 kg)	Justice	Jesse "Justice" Smith Jr.	6'8", 290 lbs (2.03 m, 131 kg)
Hellga	Robin Coleman	6'1", 205 lbs (1.83 m, 93 kg)	Militia	Alex Castro	6'3", 220 lbs (1.88 m, 99.7 kg)
Siren	Valerie Waugaman	5'9", 145 lbs (1.73 m, 66 kg)	Titan	Michael O'Hearn	6'3", 263 lbs (1.91 m, 119 kg)
Venom	Beth Horn	5'8", 137 lbs (1.70 m, 62 kg)	Toa	Tanoai Reed	6'3", 240 lbs (1.91 m, 108 kg)
			Wolf	Don "Hollywood" Yates	6'4", 225 lbs (1.94 m, 102 kg)

=== New Gladiators ===
Females			Males		
Gladiator Name	Birth Name	Height & Weight	Gladiator Name	Birth Name	Height & Weight
Jet	Monica Carlson	5'7", 120 lbs (1.68 m, 59 kg)	Rocket	Evan Dollard	5'10", 160 lbs (1.75 m, 72 kg)
Panther	Corinne van Ryck de Groot	5'5", 125 lbs (1.63m, 57 kg)	Hurricane	Breaux Greer	6'2", 230 lbs (1.85 m, 104 kg)
Phoenix	Jennifer Widerstrom	5'7", 153 lbs (1.67 m, 68 kg)	Zen	Xin Wuku	5'9", 160 lbs (1.73 m, 72 kg)
Steel	Erin Toughill	5'10", 156 lbs (1.75 m, 73 kg)	Beast	Matt Morgan	7'0", 310 lbs (2.13 m, 140 kg)

=== Reserves ===
Females		Males	
Gladiator Name	Birth Name	Gladiator Name	Birth Name
Blast	Jennifer Barry	Hammer	Michael Briehler

== Contenders ==
=== Female contenders ===
Contender Name	Height & Weight	Occupation	Quarterfinals		Semifinals		Finals
Contender Name	Height & Weight	Occupation	Heat	Result	Heat	Result	Finals
Ally Davidson	5'6", 126 lbs	Sales Rep	7	1st	1	Advanced	Winner
Tiffaney Florentine	5'1", 122 lbs	Business Consultant	4	2nd	2	Advanced	Runner-up
Abbe Dorn	5'6", 152 lbs	Denver Police Officer	3	3rd	3	3rd	
Lillian Thomassen	5'9", 150 lbs	Concrete Artist	6	5th	2	Eliminated	
Vanessa Warren	5'2", 119 lbs	U.S. Air Force Major	2	6th	1	Eliminated	
Annie Castellano	4'11", 108 lbs	College Student	9	4th	3	Eliminated	
Rochelle Gilken	4'11", 113 lbs	Crime Reporter	5	7th			
Patti Franklin	5'4", 125 lbs	Nurse	8	8th			
Tatum Yount	5'2", 122 lbs	Advertising Sales Rep	10	9th			
Melissa Trinidad	5'1", 111 lbs	Martial Arts Instructor	1	10th			
Adriana Posadas	5'7", 145 lbs	College Student	10	Eliminated			
Yoko Ohigashi	5'0", 115 lbs	Investment Broker	9	Eliminated			
Jessica Garcia	4'11", 106 lbs	Cheerleading Coach	8	Eliminated			
Kendra Sirignano	5'7", 126 lbs	Social Worker	7	Eliminated			
Clinessa Burch	5'8", 143 lbs	Concrete Business Owner	6	Eliminated			
Chuanda Mason	5'5", 113 lbs	Mother	5	Eliminated			
De Day	5'3", 115 lbs	Business Owner	4	Eliminated			
Vicki Ferrari	5'3", 124 lbs	Denver Police Officer	3	Eliminated			
Nikki Smith	5'7", 141 lbs	6th Grade Teacher	2	Eliminated			
Elena Maskalik	5'6", 143 lbs	Fire Fighter	1	Eliminated			
Nikki Key	5'6", 138 lbs	Bartender	2	Injured			

=== Male contenders ===
Contender Name	Height & Weight	Occupation	Quarterfinals		Semifinals		Finals
Contender Name	Height & Weight	Occupation	Heat	Result	Heat	Result	Finals
Tim Oliphant	5'11", 147 lbs	Camp Media Director	9	1st	1	Advanced	Winner
Mike Gamble	6'0", 160 lbs	Dancer	6	3rd	3	Advanced	Runner-up
James Ruggiero	6'1", 216 lbs	English Teacher	8	5rd	2	3rd	
Jeff Davidson	5'10", 160 lbs	Financial Advisor	7	2nd	2	Eliminated	
Randee Haynes	5'8", 175 lbs	Construction Worker	1	4th	3	Eliminated	
Brick Reilly	5'10", 165 lbs	NJ Dept. of Public Works	4	7th	1	Eliminated	
Alexander Coates	6'0", 210 lbs	Mortgage Consultant	10	6th	1	Injured	
Tony Tolbert	5'10", 150 lbs	Science Teacher	5	8th			
Gerry Garcia	5'5", 157 lbs	Special Ed. Teacher	2	9th			
Melvin Davis	5'10", 203 lbs	Chicago Police Officer	3	10th			
Anthony Pagnotta	5'11", 161 lbs	NYPD Detective	10	Eliminated			
Alejandro Soto	5'8", 160 lbs	Marine Mammal Trainer	9	Eliminated			
Sean Hetherington	5'9", 169 lbs	Personal Trainer	8	Eliminated			
Aaron Simpson	6'0", 193 lbs	Wrestling Coach	7	Eliminated			
Adam Hill	6'0", 167 lbs	ER Doctor	6	Eliminated			
Landon Jones	6'2", 216 lbs	Medical Device Salesman	5	Eliminated			
Toby Gordin	5'9", 200 lbs	Grocery Store Owner	4	Eliminated			
David Moore	5'11", 215 lbs	Chicago Police Officer	3	Eliminated			
John Siciliano	5'7", 155 lbs	Prosthetic Manufacturer	2	Eliminated			
Jay Martinez	6'0", 191 lbs	S.W.A.T. Officer	1	Eliminated			

== Events ==
=== Returning Events ===
==== Assault ====
In Assault, the turret for the second station no longer moves side to side, and a bazooka was added for the third station. Contenders no longer have to fish in the sand for an arrow or load any of the weapons with the exception of the slingshot. If a ball fired by the gladiator bounces off the floor before hitting the contender, the hit does not count.

==== Earthquake ====
In Earthquake, the contender and Gladiator wrestle on a 12-foot-diameter (3.7 m) platform that is suspended above the pool, rather than over the floor as in the first season. If the Contender takes the Gladiator off the platform, he or she is declared the winner, even if he or she also comes down in the process. A Contender gets 10 points if he or she pulls the Gladiator down, and 5 points if he or she lasts the entire 30 seconds. Holding on to the wires supporting the Earthquake ring is legal, but kicking or otherwise using the foot to remove the Contender from the ring is not. The event is similar in concept to the "Conquer", part of the "Breakthrough and Conquer" event from the original series.

==== Gauntlet ====
In the quarterfinals, the rules of Gauntlet remained largely the same as the first season. However, during the semifinals, the rules reverted to ones similar to those used in the original US version: contenders earn 10 points for completing the Gauntlet in under 20 seconds, or 5 for doing so within the 30-second limit.

==== Hang Tough ====
The rules for Hang Tough are largely the same as in the first season, except the course has been lengthened and the scoring rings are blue instead of red.

==== Hit & Run ====
Hit & Run remains largely the same as in the first season.

==== Joust ====
Joust remains largely the same as in the first season.

==== Powerball ====
In Powerball, caps have been added to the scoring pods to narrow the opening and prevent the contenders from scoring by shooting the ball and the course has been enlarged. Points scored from in outer pods are now worth one point rather than two and points scored in the inner pod are now worth two points rather than three.

==== Pyramid ====
Pyramid remains largely the same as in the first season.

==== The Wall ====
In The Wall, the height of the wall was raised to 50 feet, and each contender raced up a separate wall. Contenders and Gladiators cross floating platforms to reach the Wall (the same platforms were used at the beginning of the Eliminator in Season 1). Once the Gladiators begin their pursuit, the platforms are retracted. Contenders that are pulled or fall from the Wall drop into the water. Unlike previous editions, however, contenders earn 5 points if they are still on the Wall when the 60-second time limit expires.

=== New Events ===
==== Rocketball ====
In Rocketball, two Gladiators and two contenders begin the match at the corners of the arena. When each competitor presses a button, they are launched via their harnesses into the air toward two goals at the center of the arena. The contenders try to score by throwing balls into the goals, while the Gladiators play defense. Goals in the lower basket are worth 1 point, while goals in the upper basket are worth 2. The event is similar to an inverted version of the original series event Swingshot.

==== Sideswipe ====
Sideswipe features a series of five platforms, similar in size to those used in Joust. Each end platform has a "bullseye" target, and colored balls attached to the base. The contenders have 60 seconds to pull a ball off one platform, race across the five platforms, and place the ball in the target at the other end; each ball placed in the target earns one point. As in Hit and Run, the Gladiators try to end the event early by knocking the contender into the water. In Sideswipe, though, the Gladiators themselves are the projectiles, swinging on ropes to try to hit the contender.

==== Skytrack ====
The 2008 revival uses the UK rules of Skytrack. The two contenders race around one lap suspended upside down from a figure 8 track hanging from the ceiling of the arena. They are chased by two Gladiators, whose goal is to pull a ripcord being trailed by the Contenders. If the Gladiator pulls the ripcord, the contender is released from their carriage and is eliminated from the race. The first contender to cross the finish line earns 10 points whereas the second contender to do so earns 5 points. The contenders also face a time limit of 60 seconds. The Gladiators start further away from the contenders so they can have a fair match.

==== Snapback ====
The 2008 version of Snapback is very different from the event of the same name in the original series. In the new version, each contender is connected by a bungee cord to a Gladiator, who stands on a platform behind a 50-foot-long lane. The contenders race toward red buttons at the end of their lanes while the Gladiators resist by pulling back on their bungee lines. Contenders can earn 2, 4, 6, or 8 points based on their progress down the lane when time expires. If they reach the red button at the end of their lane, they earn 10 points and launch their Gladiator into the air (but not into the pool, as in Assault); both contenders can earn 10 points.

==== Tilt ====
The rules of Tilt, which is originally from the UK version, are similar to Tug-O-War from the original run of American Gladiators. The Contender and Gladiator begin each match on a platform situated above the pool. The Gladiator's platform is higher than the contender's and is tilted forward. The Contender's platform is tilted backwards to start the match. 5 points are awarded if the Contender can remain on the platform for the entire 30 seconds. The Contender can earn 10 points if they can pull the Gladiator off the platform and into the water. The rope is attached to both Contender and Gladiator by a harness, which removes the possibility of losing by letting go of the rope.

==== Vertigo ====
In Vertigo, which was first introduced in the UK version, the contender and Gladiator race across a course of seven flexible poles with handholds and platforms. The game begins with both competitors racing up a laddered pole. Upon reaching the top, they must then sway their pole towards the next, crossing onto it. The winner is the first to complete the course, grabbing a large hoop at the end to return to the ground. Contenders earn 10 points if they beat the Gladiator, or 5 if they reach the scoring zone (the fifth pole or beyond) if the Gladiator wins.

==== Atlasphere ====
The return of Atlasphere, last seen in Season 5 of the original series (1993–94), includes elements from the original series. The competitors begin on ramps, as in Seasons 3 and 4 of the original series, and each contender must roll his/her sphere directly over the sensors in the middle of the pod to release a blast of steam and score 2 points.

=== The Eliminator ===
In season 2 the Eliminator had these tasks

- Jump directly into the pool and swim under the fiery surface.
- Climb up a cargo net.
- Rope swing downward.
- Tightrope walk downward.
- Use a Hand bike to cross over a 6 ft deep ball pit.
- Run across a spinning barrel.
- Climb the Pyramid.
- Travel down a zipline.
- Cross a teeter-totter.
- Run up the Travelator.
- Climb a short flight of stairs.
- Rope swing through a banner into the pool.

== Quarterfinals ==
=== Females ===
Heat 1

Contender	Events				Final Score	Headstart	Result
Contender	Pyramid	Joust	Assault	Wall	Final Score	Headstart	Result
Elena Maskalik	0	0	4	10	14	5.0s	Loss
Melissa Trinidad	0	0	4	0	4		Win

Heat 2

Contender	Events				Final Score	Headstart	Result
Contender	Pyramid	Gauntlet	Vertigo	Powerball	Final Score	Headstart	Result
Nikki Key/Nikki Smith	0	10	0	2	12	0.5s	Loss
Vanessa Warren	0	10	0	1	11		Win

Heat 3

Contender	Events						Final Score	Headstart	Result
Contender	Rocketball	Hang Tough	Earthquake	Assault	Skytrack	Wall	Final Score	Headstart	Result
Abbe Dorn	6	5	5	5	0	0	21	7.0s	Win
Vicki Ferrari	5	0	5	4	0	0	14		Loss

Heat 4

Contender	Events						Final Score	Headstart	Result
Contender	Pyramid	Joust	Rocket Ball	Earthquake	Tilt	Skytrack	Final Score	Headstart	Result
De Day	0	0	4	5	10	0	19	2.0s	Loss
Tiffaney Florentine	0	0	5	10	0	0	15		Win

Heat 5

Contender	Events						Final Score	Headstart	Result
Contender	Hang Tough	Assault	Vertigo	Tilt	Skytrack	Joust	Final Score	Headstart	Result
Rochelle Gilken	0	2	0	0	0	0	2		Win
Chuanda Mason	0	3	5	0	0	0	8	3.0s	Loss

Heat 6

Contender	Events						Final Score	Headstart	Result
Contender	Hit and Run	Rocket Ball	Wall	Pyramid	Skytrack	Snapback	Final Score	Headstart	Result
Lillian Thomassen	12	3	5	0	0	8	28		Win
Clinessa Burch	12	4	10	0	0	4	30	1.0s	Loss

Heat 7

Contender	Events						Final Score	Headstart	Result
Contender	Powerball	Wall	Earthquake	Rocket Ball	Skytrack	Sideswipe	Final Score	Headstart	Result
Ally Davidson	3	10	0	10	0	3	26	5.0s	Win
Kendra Sirignano	3	0	5	4	0	4	16		Loss

Heat 8

Contender	Events						Final Score	Headstart	Result
Contender	Joust	Hit and Run	Rocket Ball	Tilt	Skytrack	Snapback	Final Score	Headstart	Result
Jessica Garcia	5	8	4	0	0	4	21	5.0s	Loss
Patti Franklin	0	8	1	0	0	2	11		Win

Heat 9

Contender	Events						Final Score	Headstart	Result
Contender	Joust	Pyramid	Wall	Hang Tough	Snapback	Sideswipe	Final Score	Headstart	Result
Yoko Ohigashi	0	0	0	5	4	1	10		Loss
Annie Castellano	0	0	10	0	0	1	11	0.5s	Win

Heat 10

Contender	Events						Final Score	Headstart	Result
Contender	Powerball	Pyramid	Hang Tough	Joust	Skytrack	Earthquake	Final Score	Headstart	Result
Tatum Yount	0	0	0	0	0	0	0		Win
Adriana Posadas	3	0	5	0	0	0	8	4.0s	Loss

==== Eliminator Times ====
#	Contender	Time
1	Ally Davidson	2:08
2	Tiffaney Florentine	2:57
3	Abbe Dorn	2:58
4	Annie Castellano	3:00
5	Lillian Thomassen	3:08
6	Vanessa Warren	3:21
7	Rochelle Gilken	3:48
8	Patti Franklin	4:32
9	Tatum Yount	6:11
10	Melissa Trinidad	9:42

=== Males ===
Heat 1

Contender	Events				Final Score	Headstart	Result
Contender	Rocket Ball	Hang Tough	Gauntlet	Pyramid	Final Score	Headstart	Result
Randee Haynes	2	5	6	0	13	0.5s	Win
Jay Martinez	2	0	10	0	12		Loss

Heat 2

Contender	Events				Final Score	Headstart	Result
Contender	Hang Tough	Rocket Ball	Powerball	Wall	Final Score	Headstart	Result
John Siciliano	0	1	1	0	2		Loss
Gerry Garcia	0	5	0	0	5	1.5s	Win

Heat 3

Contender	Events						Final Score	Headstart	Result
Contender	Powerball	Joust	Earthquake	Gauntlet	Skytrack	Wall	Final Score	Headstart	Result
Melvin Davis	1	0	10	4	0	0	15		Win
David Moore	1	0	10	10	0	0	21	3.0s	Loss

Heat 4

Contender	Events						Final Score	Headstart	Result
Contender	Hang Tough	Joust	Rocket Ball	Vertigo	Tilt	Skytrack	Final Score	Headstart	Result
Brick Reilly	0	0	4	10	10	10	34	12.5s	Win
Toby Gordin	0	0	4	5	0	0	9		Loss

Heat 5

Contender	Events						Final Score	Headstart	Result
Contender	Gauntlet	Assault	Powerball	Skytrack	Wall	Joust	Final Score	Headstart	Result
Landon Jones	10	5	5	0	0	0	20	2.0s	Loss
Tony Tolbert	10	4	2	0	0	0	16		Win

Heat 6

Contender	Events						Final Score	Headstart	Result
Contender	Pyramid	Tilt	Earthquake	Hit and Run	Wall	Snapback	Final Score	Headstart	Result
Adam Hill	0	5	10	0	0	8	23	3.5s	Loss
Mike Gamble	0	0	0	12	0	4	16		Win

Heat 7

Contender	Events						Final Score	Headstart	Result
Contender	Joust	Pyramid	Wall	Rocket Ball	Hang Tough	Sideswipe	Final Score	Headstart	Result
Jeff Davidson	0	0	10	7	10	4	31		Win
Aaron Simpson	0	10	0	12	10	7	39	4.0s	Loss

Heat 8

Contender	Events						Final Score	Headstart	Result
Contender	Powerball	Joust	Hang Tough	Rocket Ball	Earthquake	Snapback	Final Score	Headstart	Result
Sean Hetherington	1	0	0	4	0	0	5		Loss
James Ruggiero	2	10	10	9	0	10	41	18.0s	Win

Heat 9

Contender	Events						Final Score	Headstart	Result
Contender	Pyramid	Wall	Snapback	Tilt	Skytrack	Sideswipe	Final Score	Headstart	Result
Tim Oliphant	10	0	0	0	0	6	16		Win
Alejandro Soto	5	10	4	0	0	2	21	2.5s	Loss

Heat 10

Contender	Events						Final Score	Headstart	Result
Contender	Powerball	Rocket Ball	Hang Tough	Pyramid	Wall	Earthquake	Final Score	Headstart	Result
Anthony Pagnotta	0	4	5	0	0	0	9	1.5s	Loss
Alexander Coates	2	4	0	0	0	0	6		Win

==== Eliminator Times ====
#	Contender	Time
1	Tim Oliphant	1:24
2	Jeff Davidson	1:34
3	Mike Gamble	1:58
4	Randee Haynes	2:06
5	James Ruggerio	2:07
6	Alexander Coates	2:08
7	Brick Reilly	2:10
8	Tony Tolbert	2:56
9	Gerry Garcia	3:03
10	Melvin Davis	10:30

== Semifinals ==
=== Females ===
Heat 1

Contender	Events						Final Score	Headstart	Result
Contender	Rocket Ball	Atlasphere	Gauntlet	Hang Tough	Skytrack	Powerball	Final Score	Headstart	Result
Ally Davidson	6	2	10	0	0	5	23	2.5s	Win
Vanessa Warren	6	0	5	5	0	2	18		Loss

Heat 2

Contender	Events						Final Score	Headstart	Result
Contender	Pyramid	Tilt	Gauntlet	Hang Tough	Skytrack	Joust	Final Score	Headstart	Result
Lillian Thomassen	0	5	5	0	0	0	10	2.5s	Loss
Tiffaney Florentine	0	0	5	0	0	0	5		Win

Heat 3

Contender	Events						Final Score	Headstart	Result
Contender	Rocket Ball	Atlasphere	Gauntlet	Tilt	Joust	Powerball	Final Score	Headstart	Result
Abbe Dorn	7	4	5	5	0	4	25	3.5s	Win
Annie Castellano	5	2	0	5	0	6	18		Loss

=== Eliminator Times ===
#	Contender	Time
1	Tiffaney Florentine	2:06
2	Ally Davidson	2:07
3	Abbe Dorn	2:16

=== Males ===
Heat 1

Contender	Events						Final Score	Headstart	Result
Contender	Rocket Ball	Atlasphere	Pyramid	Tilt	Skytrack	Joust	Final Score	Headstart	Result
Tim Oliphant	4	4	5	0	0	0	13	3.0s	Win
Alexander Coates/Brick Reilly	3	4	0	0	0	0	7		Loss

Heat 2

Contender	Events						Final Score	Headstart	Result
Contender	Rocket Ball	Atlasphere	Gauntlet	Hang Tough	Tilt	Powerball	Final Score	Headstart	Result
Jeff Davidson	2	4	5	0	0	2	13		Loss
James Ruggiero	6	2	10	10	5	1	34	10.5s	Win

Heat 3

Contender	Events						Final Score	Headstart	Result
Contender	Pyramid	Hang Tough	Atlasphere	Skytrack	Joust	Powerball	Final Score	Headstart	Result
Randee Haynes	5	0	4	0	0	5	14	none	Loss
Mike Gamble	10	0	2	0	0	2	14	none	Win

==== Eliminator Times ====
#	Contender	Time
1	Tim Oliphant	1:17
2	Mike Gamble	1:35
3	James Ruggiero	1:43

== Finals ==
=== Females ===
Contender	Events						Final Score	Headstart	Result
Contender	Sideswipe	Hang Tough	Joust	Pyramid	Rocket Ball	Wall	Final Score	Headstart	Result
Ally Davidson	2	0	0	0	10	5	17		Win
Tiffaney Florentine	4	10	0	0	3	10	27	5.0s	Loss

==== Eliminator Times ====
#	Contender	Time
1	Ally Davidson	1:46

=== Males ===
Contender	Events						Final Score	Headstart	Result
Contender	Gauntlet	Sideswipe	Pyramid	Hang Tough	Rocket Ball	Wall	Final Score	Headstart	Result
Tim Oliphant	5	7	10	0	4	10	36	12.5s	Win
Mike Gamble	0	5	5	0	1	0	11		Loss

==== Eliminator Times ====
#	Contender	Time
1	Tim Oliphant	1:21

== Elimination Table ==
Females

Contender	Round													
Contender	Quarterfinals										Semifinals			Finals
Contender	Heat 1	Heat 2	Heat 3	Heat 4	Heat 5	Heat 6	Heat 7	Heat 8	Heat 9	Heat 10	Heat 1	Heat 2	Heat 3	Finals
Ally							WIN				WIN		RISK	WINNER
Tiffaney				WIN								WIN		RUNNER-UP
Abbe			WIN										WIN	
Annie									WIN				OUT	
Lillian						WIN						OUT		
Vanessa		WIN								RISK	OUT			
Tatum										WIN				
Adriana										OUT				
Rochelle					WIN			RISK	RISK					
Yoko									OUT					
Patti								WIN						
Jessica								OUT						
Melissa	WIN						RISK							
Kendra							OUT							
Clinessa						OUT								
Chuanda					OUT									
De				OUT										
Vicky			OUT											
Nikki Smith		OUT												
Nikki Key		INJ												
Elena	OUT													

Males

Contender	Round													
Contender	Quarterfinals										Semifinals			Finals
Contender	Heat 1	Heat 2	Heat 3	Heat 4	Heat 5	Heat 6	Heat 7	Heat 8	Heat 9	Heat 10	Heat 1	Heat 2	Heat 3	Finals
Tim									WIN		WIN			WINNER
Mike						WIN							WIN	RUNNER-UP
James								WIN				WIN	RISK	
Jeff							WIN						OUT	
Randee	WIN											OUT		
Brick				WIN						RISK	OUT			
Alexander										WIN	INJ			
Anthony										OUT				
Tony					WIN				RISK					
Alejandro									OUT					
Gerry		WIN						RISK						
Sean								OUT						
Melvin			WIN				RISK							
Aaron							OUT							
Adam						OUT								
Landon					OUT									
Toby				OUT										
David			OUT											
John		OUT												
Jay	OUT													

The contender won their heat, and had an Eliminator time that qualified for the leaderboard.
The contender won their heat, but did not finish an Eliminator time that qualified for the leaderboard.
The contender was the contender on the leaderboard with the slowest time in the Eliminator, but was not eliminated.
The contender was the contender on the leaderboard with the slowest time in the Eliminator, and was eliminated.
The contender did not compete.
The contender was eliminated from the competition.
The contender was injured during an event and was forced to withdraw from the competition.

== Special episodes ==
Season 2 featured a number of "theme" episodes. These episodes were not stand-alone episodes.

Episode 2: Both competitions featured cops who work together: Melvin Davis and David Moore work in the Chicago Police Department, while Abbe Dorn and Vicki Ferrari are partners working in Denver.

Episode 4: This episode was dedicated to the movie The Incredible Hulk. Special Hulk themed elements to the show included: green lighting in the rafters and the pool; the use of green scoring balls in Powerball (one contender used solid green balls, the other used green and black balls); Gauntlet power pads being replaced by "Hulk Hands"; and Titan competing in Joust covered in green body paint. Lou Ferrigno, who portrayed the Incredible Hulk on the 1978 TV series, was in the audience for this episode.

Episode 5: Twin sisters Clinessa Burch and Lillian Thomassen competed against one another.

Episode 6: Two married couples—Jeff and Ally Davidson, and Aaron Simpson and Kendra Sirignano—competed (individually).

Episode 7: All four contestants had lost 50 or more pounds prior to competing on the show.

Episode 9: The female competition was called "The Battle of the Ages" as it pitted the youngest contender of the season, Annie Castellano, age 20, against the oldest contender ever on the show, Yoko Ohigashi, age 52.
