= American Gladiators (2008 TV series) season 1 =

Season of American reality television series

American Gladiators
- Season 1
- Hosted by: Hulk Hogan; Laila Ali
- No. of contestants: 24
- Winners: Evan Dollard; Monica Carlson
- No. of episodes: 8

Release
- Original network: NBC
- Original release: January 8 – February 17, 2008

Season chronology
- Next → Season 2

The first season of the 2008 American Gladiators revival premiered on January 8, 2008, and concluded on February 17 of the same year, airing on NBC in the United States and Citytv in Canada.

== Format ==
Season 1 of the revival featured 24 contenders (12 male, 12 female). Men and women compete in separate tournaments, with two men and two women competing in each episode. In each episode, contenders take part in several events against the Gladiators, trying to earn as many points as possible before the final event, the Eliminator. Each point separating the contenders translates into a half-second advantage for the leader (or a half-second handicap for the trailing contender). Preliminary round matches consisted of four events plus the Eliminator; semifinals and finals matches were extended to five events plus the Eliminator (by comparison, the original series had either six or seven events plus the Eliminator).

The four male contenders and the four female contenders who won their respective preliminary matches with the fastest Eliminator times advanced to the semifinals; the winners of the two semifinals matches competed in the finals.

The grand prize was $100,000, a 2008 Toyota Sequoia, and the right to become a Gladiator for Season 2.

== Gladiators ==
Females			Males		
Gladiator Name	Birth Name	Height & Weight	Gladiator Name	Birth Name	Height & Weight
Crush	Gina Carano	5'8", 150 lbs (1.70 m, 68 kg)	Justice	Jesse "Justice" Smith, Jr.	6'8", 290 lbs (2.03 m, 131 kg)
Fury	Jamie Reed	5'8", 150 lbs (1.70 m, 68 kg).	Mayhem	William Romeo	6'6", 230 lbs (1.98 m, 104 kg)
Hellga	Robin Coleman	6'1", 205 lbs (1.83 m, 93 kg)	Militia	Alex Castro	6'3", 220 lbs (1.88 m, 99.7 kg)
Siren	Valerie Waugaman	5'9", 145 lbs (1.73 m, 66 kg)	Titan	Michael O'Hearn	6'3", 263 lbs (1.91 m, 119 kg)
Stealth	Tanji Johnson	5'2", 100 lbs (1.55 m, 56 kg)	Toa	Tanoai Reed	6'3", 240 lbs (1.91 m, 108 kg)
Venom	Beth Horn	5'8", 137 lbs (1.70 m, 62 kg)	Wolf	Don "Hollywood" Yates	6'4", 225 lbs (1.94 m, 102 kg)

=== Reserves ===
Females		Males	
Gladiator Name	Birth Name	Gladiator Name	Birth Name
Blast	Jennifer Barry	Hammer	Michael Briehler

== Contenders ==
=== Female contenders ===
Contender Name	Height & Weight	Occupation	Quarterfinals		Semifinals		Finals
Contender Name	Height & Weight	Occupation	Heat	Result	Heat	Result	Finals
Monica Carlson	5'7", 130 lbs	Fitness Model	4	1st	2	Advanced	Winner
Shannay Norvell	5'5", 141 lbs	Youth Counselor	2	2nd	1	Advanced	Runner-up
Venus Ramos	5'4", 125 lbs	Rehab Physician	1	4th	2	Eliminated	
Siene Silva	5'4", 127 lbs	Gymnastics Coach	3	3rd	1	Eliminated	
Toni Oppliger	5'5", 121 lbs	High School Athletic Director	6	5th			
Jennifer Blum	5'6", 155 lbs	Lawyer	5	6th			
Kim Marciniak	5'3", 116 lbs	Cheerleader	6	Eliminated			
Christine Kim	5'3", 117 lbs	Mortgage Broker	5	Eliminated			
Belinda Gavin	5'7", 130 lbs	Bull Rider	4	Eliminated			
Christie Philips	5'7", 130 lbs	Karate Instructor	3	Eliminated			
Bonnie Blanco	5'7", 138 lbs	Retired Marine	2	Eliminated			
Koya Webb	5'10", 145 lbs	Life Coach	1	Eliminated			
Jessie Adams	5'5", 140 lbs	Sales Rep	1	Injured			

=== Male contenders ===
Contender Name	Height & Weight	Occupation	Quarterfinals		Semifinals		Finals
Contender Name	Height & Weight	Occupation	Heat	Result	Heat	Result	Finals
Evan Dollard	5'10", 160 lbs	Retail Manager	5	1st	1	Advanced	Winner
Alex Rai	5'8", 150 lbs	History Teacher	6	2nd	2	Advanced	Runner-up
Andy Konigsmark	5'10", 185 lbs	Youth Minister	4	3rd	2	Eliminated	
Anthony Abbatemarco	5'10", 190 lbs	New York City Firefighter	1	4th	1	Eliminated	
Molivann Duy	5'7", 155 lbs	Dare Care Provider	2	5th			
Adonis Lockett	6'0", 196 lbs	Engineer	3	6th			
Mark Baker	5'11", 185 lbs	Chiropractor	6	Eliminated			
Son Nguyen	6'0", 165 lbs	Firefighter	5	Eliminated			
Sharaud Moore	5'11", 205 lbs	Algebra Teacher	4	Eliminated			
Adam Levin	5'9", 175 lbs	Shark Fisherman	4	Injured			
Jeff Chapman	6'4", 248 lbs	Radiation Control Technician	3	Eliminated			
Jeff Keller	5'11", 208 lbs	Ad Sales	2	Eliminated			
Chad Knight	5'10", 180 lbs	Pro Skateboarder	1	Eliminated			

== Events ==
The following is a list of events featured on American Gladiators. Descriptions of events that were played on the original version of American Gladiators contain only the changes made in the revival and the season the event was introduced in is shown in brackets. Season 1 featured a total of ten events, including the Eliminator.

=== Assault ===
In Assault, the contenders begin the course holding the ball for use in the first weapon, a slingshot. The second station is a rotating turret that contenders must rotate into position and load themselves. The third station is a sandpit where an arrow is hidden for the crossbow waiting at station four (they complete the station by finding the arrow). Contenders are given a smokescreen at station three to assist in moving to station four. The fifth station consists of throwing three balls at the target. If the contenders hit any part of the target, they earn 10 points. Hitting the target or pushing the button at the end of the course triggers pyrotechnics at the Gladiator's platform, and the Gladiator is rapidly pulled off the platform by a pulley and harness fly system across the arena and into the water tank. If time runs out, or contenders are hit by a ball fired by the Gladiator before hitting the target, they earn one point for each station completed.

=== Earthquake ===
In Earthquake, the contender and Gladiator wrestle on a 12-foot-diameter (3.7 m) platform that is suspended above the floor and is moved during the event. If the Contender takes the Gladiator off the platform, he or she is declared the winner, even if he or she also comes down in the process. A Contender gets 10 points if he or she pulls the Gladiator down, and 5 points if he or she lasts the entire 30 seconds. Holding on to the wires supporting the Earthquake ring is legal, but kicking or otherwise using the foot to remove the Contender from the ring is not. The event is similar in concept to "Conquer", the second part of "Breakthrough and Conquer".

=== Gauntlet ===
In Gauntlet, the contenders earn two points for each of four Gladiators they pass within the 30-second time limit and an additional two points if they can break through a foam wall 10 feet beyond the final Gladiator, for a maximum of 10 points. The rule change is similar to the seventh and eighth seasons of the UK Series. In addition, the Gauntlet is enclosed, so contenders cannot be pushed "out of bounds."

=== Hang Tough ===
In Hang Tough the course is shorter, situated over a pool of water, and has much smaller platforms. Further, the Gladiator is allowed to use the contender's equipment (such as the straps holding the backpack) to pull the contender in. As in the original version, contenders receive 5 points if they are still on the course when the 60-second time limit expires.

=== Hit & Run ===
In Hit & Run, which was first introduced in the UK version, the contender traverses a 50-foot suspension bridge hanging above the water tank. Four Gladiators, two on each side of the bridge, attempt to knock the contender off using 100-pound demolition balls. Contenders receive two points for each successful trip across the bridge within the 60-second time limit, and must press a button on the platform to register the points (a difference from the UK version, which required contenders to touch the rail at the back of the platform). Furthermore, there is no penalty for crawling on the suspension bridge, as there was in the UK version, though the referee has instructed contenders to return to their feet in some instances after significant crawling.

=== Joust ===
In Joust, the platforms are situated over a pool of water. Gladiators, but not contenders, may be disqualified if both their knees touch the platform simultaneously. Both gladiators and contenders will be disqualified if they step on their opponents' platform. If gladiator is knocked off by contender the contender will earn 10 points. If the contestant does not get hit off by 30 seconds then the contender will receive 5 points.

=== Powerball ===
In Powerball, the time limit is now 60 seconds. In addition, the playing field is lined with padded walls, which means there is no "out of bounds," and the scoring bins have much wider openings, making tossed balls more effective than the original. For Season 2, caps have been added to the scoring pods to narrow the opening and prevent the contenders from scoring by shooting the ball and the course has been enlarged.

=== Pyramid ===
In Pyramid, Modified UK Gladiators rules have been adopted. Contenders earn 5 points for getting their feet atop the Pyramid tier marked with a white dotted line. Pressing the button at the top within the 60-second time limit is worth 5 more points, for a total of 10, and immediately ends the event.

=== The Wall ===
The Wall uses the original format, with a three-section Wall, and contestants are given a seven-second head start. The Wall was 40 feet high in Season 1 (an eight-foot increase over the Wall in the original American Gladiators). Contenders and Gladiators cross floating platforms to reach the Wall (the same platforms were used at the beginning of the Eliminator). Once the Gladiators begin their pursuit, the platforms are retracted. Contenders that are pulled or fall from the Wall drop into the water. Unlike previous editions, however, contenders earn 5 points if they are still on the Wall when the 60-second time limit expires.

== The Eliminator ==
In Season 1, The Eliminator had these tasks:

- Traverse the floating platforms used in the Wall
- Climb an 8-foot wall. (a rope is provided to help climb up)
- Swim under a fiery surface.
- Climb a 30-foot cargo net.
- Go downward on an inclined barrel roll (A rope is provided to help hold on)
- Use a hand bike to cross a pit
- Run down a balance beam inclined downward
- Run up the pyramid
- Travel down a zipline
- Run up the Travelator (a rope is provided to help climb up)
- Climb a short flight of stairs
- Then crash through the foam wall from gauntlet

== Quarterfinals ==
=== Females ===
Heat 1

Contender	Events				Final Score	Headstart	Result
Contender	Powerball	Joust	Earthquake	Pyramid	Final Score	Headstart	Result
Koya Webb	6	5	0	0	11		Loss
Jessie Adams/Venus Ramos	2	0	5	5	12	0.5s	Win

Heat 2

Contender	Events				Final Score	Headstart	Result
Contender	Gauntlet	Wall	Hang Tough	Hit & Run	Final Score	Headstart	Result
Bonnie Blanco	10	10	5	0	25	1.0s	Loss
Shannay Norvell	10	5	10	2	27		Win

Heat 3

Contender	Events				Final Score	Headstart	Result
Contender	Gauntlet	Joust	Hang Tough	Assault	Final Score	Headstart	Result
Christie Philips	6	0	0	1	7		Loss
Siene Silva	10	0	10	2	22	7.5s	Win

Heat 4

Contender	Events				Final Score	Headstart	Result
Contender	Powerball	Joust	Assault	Pyramid	Final Score	Headstart	Result
Monica Carlson	6	10	1	10	27	6.5s	Win
Belinda Gavin	4	0	10	0	14		Loss

Heat 5

Contender	Events				Final Score	Headstart	Result
Contender	Wall	Earthquake	Assault	Hit & Run	Final Score	Headstart	Result
Christine Kim	0	5	3	10	18		Loss
Jennifer Blum	0	5	10	8	23	2.5s	Win

Heat 6

Contender	Events				Final Score	Headstart	Result
Contender	Powerball	Joust	Hang Tough	Assault	Final Score	Headstart	Result
Toni Oppliger	0	10	5	4	19	0.5s	Win
Kim Marciniak	4	10	0	4	18		Loss

==== Eliminator Times ====
#	Contender	Time
1	Monica Carlson	2:00.0
2	Siene Silva	2:22.0
3	Shannay Norvell	2:22.4
4	Venus Ramos	3:37.6
5	Toni Oppliger	3:44.6
6	Jennifer Blum	4:07.1

=== Males ===
Heat 1

Contender	Events				Final Score	Headstart	Result
Contender	Powerball	Hang Tough	Hit & Run	Pyramid	Final Score	Headstart	Result
Anthony Abbatemarco	12	10	10	5	37	16.5s	Win
Chad Knight	2	0	2	0	4		Loss

Heat 2

Contender	Events				Final Score	Headstart	Result
Contender	Gauntlet	Joust	Assault	Pyramid	Final Score	Headstart	Result
Jeff Keller	8	10	2	0	20	1.0s	Loss
Molivann Duy	6	10	2	0	18		Win

Heat 3

Contender	Events				Final Score	Headstart	Result
Contender	Gauntlet	Wall	Earthquake	Hang Tough	Final Score	Headstart	Result
Adonis Lockett	10	0	0	10	20		Win
Jeff Chapman	8	10	10	0	28	4.0s	Loss

Heat 4

Contender	Events				Final Score	Headstart	Result
Contender	Powerball	Joust	Hit & Run	Assault	Final Score	Headstart	Result
Adam Levin/Andy Konigsmark	2	0	8	3	13		Win
Sharaud Moore	2	10	8	1	21	4.0s	Loss

Heat 5

Contender	Events				Final Score	Headstart	Result
Contender	Gauntlet	Pyramid	Assault	Wall	Final Score	Headstart	Result
Evan Dollard	10	0	10	10	30	9.0s	Win
Son Nguyen	6	0	1	5	12		Loss

Heat 6

Contender	Events				Final Score	Headstart	Result
Contender	Powerball	Earthquake	Hang Tough	Hit & Run	Final Score	Headstart	Result
Mark Baker	4	10	0	8	22		Loss
Alex Rai	6	0	10	14	30	4.0s	Win

==== Eliminator Times ====
#	Contender	Time
1	Evan Dollard	1:29.0
2	Alex Rai	1:38.0
3	Andy Konigsmark	2:04.1
4	Anthony Abbatemarco	2:10.3
5	Molivann Duy	2:13.4
6	Adonis Lockett	3:47.0

== Semifinals ==
=== Females ===
Heat 1

Contender	Events					Final Score	Headstart	Result
Contender	Hit & Run	Hang Tough	Gauntlet	Joust	Wall	Final Score	Headstart	Result
Shannay Norvell	8	0	10	5	0	23	2.5s	Win
Siene Silva	8	0	10	0	0	18		Loss

Heat 2

Contender	Events					Final Score	Headstart	Result
Contender	Powerball	Hang Tough	Joust	Wall	Pyramid	Final Score	Headstart	Result
Monica Carlson	9	10	10	10	0	39	16.0s	Win
Venus Ramos	7	0	0	0	0	7		Loss

==== Eliminator Times ====
#	Contender	Time
1	Shannay Norvell	1:51.0
2	Monica Carlson	1:54.1

=== Males ===
Heat 1

Contender	Events					Final Score	Headstart	Result
Contender	Powerball	Hang Tough	Joust	Wall	Pyramid	Final Score	Headstart	Result
Evan Dollard	6	10	0	10	5	31	5.0s	Win
Anthony Abbatemarco	6	5	0	5	5	21		Loss

Heat 2

Contender	Events					Final Score	Headstart	Result
Contender	Hit & Run	Hang Tough	Gauntlet	Joust	Wall	Final Score	Headstart	Result
Andy Konigsmark	2	5	10	10	5	32	5.0s	Loss
Alex Rai	6	0	6	0	10	22		Win

==== Eliminator Times ====
#	Contender	Time
1	Evan Dollard	1:23.0
2	Alex Rai	1:49.1

== Finals ==
=== Females ===
Contender	Events					Final Score	Headstart	Result
Contender	Hang Tough	Assault	Joust	Pyramid	Wall	Final Score	Headstart	Result
Monica Carlson	0	10	0	0	10	20	3.5s	Win
Shannay Norvell	0	3	5	0	5	13		Loss

=== Males ===
Contender	Events					Final Score	Headstart	Result
Contender	Hang Tough	Assault	Joust	Pyramid	Wall	Final Score	Headstart	Result
Evan Dollard	10	10	0	0	10	30	9.5s	Win
Alex Rai	0	1	0	5	5	11		Loss

== Elimination Table ==
Females

Contender	Round								
Contender	Quarterfinals						Semifinals		Finals
Contender	Heat 1	Heat 2	Heat 3	Heat 4	Heat 5	Heat 6	Heat 1	Heat 2	Finals
Monica				WIN				WIN	WINNER
Shannay		WIN					WIN		RUNNER-UP
Venus	WIN				RISK	RISK		OUT	
Siene			WIN				OUT		
Toni						WIN			
Kim						OUT			
Jennifer					WIN				
Christine					OUT				
Belinda				OUT					
Christie			OUT						
Bonnie		OUT							
Koya	OUT								
Jessie	INJ								

Males

Contender	Round								
Contender	Quarterfinals						Semifinals		Finals
Contender	Heat 1	Heat 2	Heat 3	Heat 4	Heat 5	Heat 6	Heat 1	Heat 2	Finals
Evan					WIN		WIN		WINNER
Alex						WIN		WIN	RUNNER-UP
Andy				WIN				OUT	
Anthony	WIN						OUT		
Molivann		WIN				RISK			
Mark						OUT			
Adonis			WIN		RISK				
Son					OUT				
Sharaud				OUT					
Adam				INJ					
Jeff C			OUT						
Jeff K		OUT							
Chad	OUT								

The contender won their heat, and placed in the Top 4 or advanced to the next round.
The contender won their heat, but did not finish with one of the Top 4 times on the Eliminator.
The contender was in the Top 4 with the slowest time in the Eliminator, but was not eliminated.
The contender was in the Top 4 with the slowest time in the Eliminator, and was eliminated.
The contender did not compete.
The contender was eliminated from the competition.
The contender was injured during an event and was forced to withdraw from the competition.
