= Potent potables =

Potent potables may refer to:

- Alcoholic beverages
- A recurring category on the game show Jeopardy! and on the Saturday Night Live skit "Celebrity Jeopardy!", that both refer to alcoholic drinks.
