= Sean Hetherington =

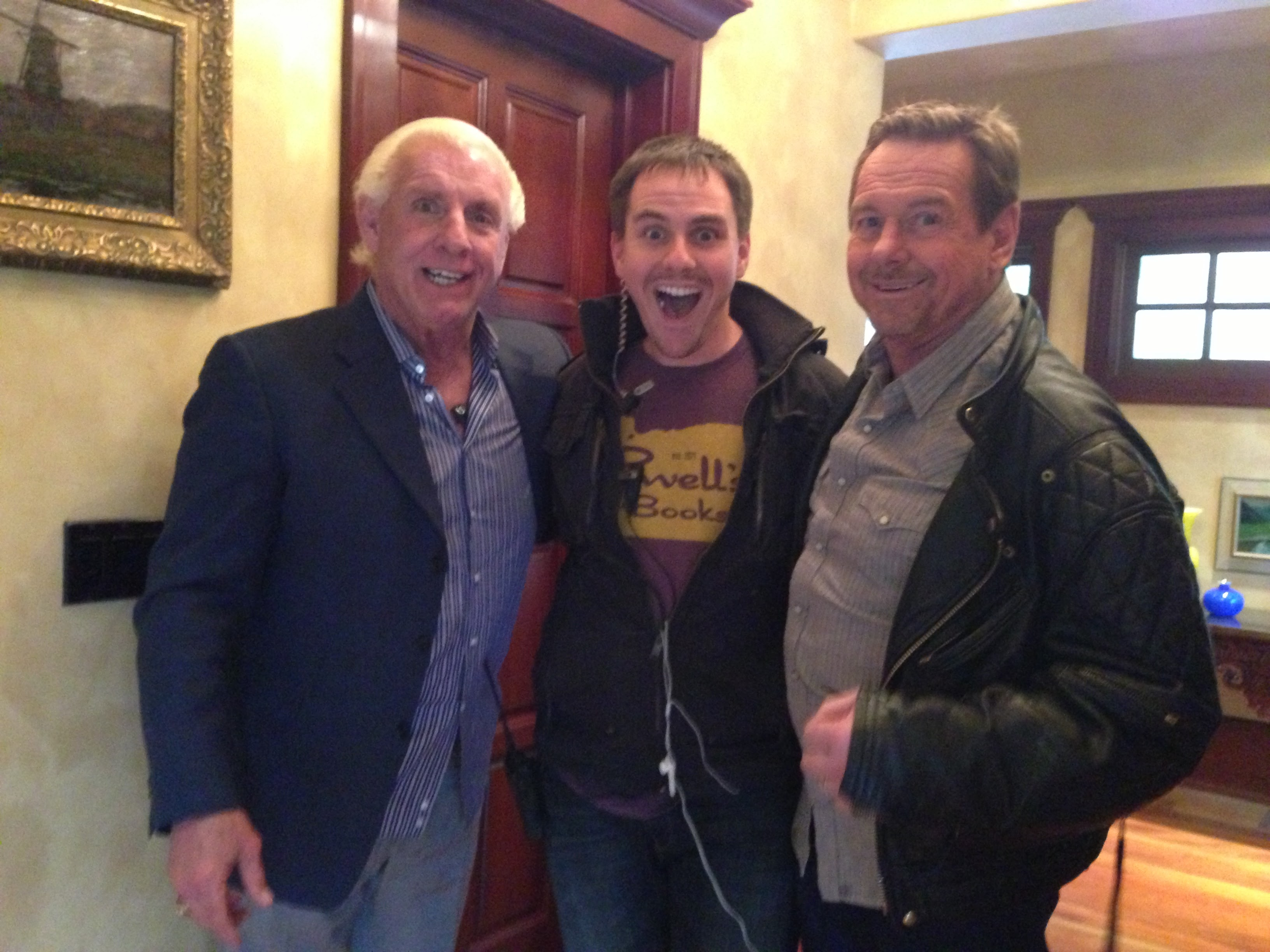
Hetherington in 2013 with Ric Flair and "Rowdy" Roddy Piper, whom he cast on ABC's Celebrity Wife Swap.

Sean Hetherington is an American casting director and reality TV producer. He is a former stand-up comedian who was a contestant in the second season of NBC's American Gladiators on their Weight Loss Survivors episode.

In 2008, Hetherington was cast on the Extreme Weight-Loss edition of American Gladiators. After his appearance, he gained media attention in the pages of Us Weekly, AfterElton, Sirius Satellite Radio, MTV and E!

In 2008, Hetherington and his then boyfriend, Aaron Hartzler, founded the international volunteer movement Day Without A Gay. LGBT people were asked to call in "gay for the day" and spend the day volunteering as a form of peaceful protest. Day Without A Gay was covered in The New York Times, CNN, and The Wall Street Journal.

Since 2010, Hetherington has served as casting director and producer on TLC's This is Life Live, ABC's Celebrity Wife Swap, Oxygen's Battle of the Ex Besties, MTV's Real World, CBS' Undercover Boss, and E!'s Famously Single.

Hetherington is an alumnus of Belmont University.
