= Against the Dark =

- Official movie poster
- Directed by: Richard Crudo
- Written by: Mathew Klickstein
- Produced by: Phillip B. Goldfine
- Starring: Steven Seagal; Tanoai Reed; Jenna Harrison; Linden Ashby; Emma Catherwood; Skye Bennett; Keith David
- Cinematography: William Trautvetter
- Edited by: Tim Silano
- Music by: Philip White
- Distributed by: Sony Pictures Home Entertainment
- Release date: February 10, 2009
- Running time: 93 minutes
- Country: United States
- Language: English
- Budget: $7,000,000

Against the Dark is a 2009 American action horror film starring Steven Seagal and directed by Richard Crudo. the film was released on direct-to-DVD in the United States on February 10, 2009.

In a post-apocalyptic world, destroyed by a disease, which turns infected humans into beings strongly resembling vampires, Seagal plays Tao, the leader of a squad of ex-military vigilantes who are attempting to find and rescue a group of survivors trapped in a hospital. This is Steven Seagal's first American horror film.

== Plot ==
An epidemic disease has overwhelmed humanity, turning nearly everyone into blood-thirsty infected who resemble vampires and zombies. There is no known cure and there are very few survivors left fighting "against the dark".

Tao (Seagal) is in charge of a group of vampire/zombie hunters. The survivors in the hospital are shown to be scared, isolated and untrusting. As the characters work their way through the hospital, they drift apart numerous times, often getting lost and attacked. To make matters worse for the survivors, a massive army base is planning to bomb the area at dawn.

The survivors must get to the one functioning exit from the hospital before the emergency power runs out and they are shut inside. In addition, many of the stairways and elevators are blocked off, forcing them to make their way level by level.

Meanwhile, Cross (Linden Ashby) tries to prevent Lieutenant Waters (Keith David) from unleashing a bombing raid on the hospital. A number of survivors and a hunter are killed and a different hunter is infected as they make their way out of the hospital. A survivor is captured by a human to be fed on by his infected daughter, but is rescued by Tao. As the humans make their way out, a horde of infected chase them. As they exit the hospital just in time before the power fails the vampires become trapped inside. The surviving humans then run as jet planes bomb the forsaken hospital.

== Cast ==
- Steven Seagal as Tao
- Tanoai Reed as Tagart
- Jenna Harrison as Dorothy
- Danny Midwinter as Morgan
- Emma Catherwood as Amelia
- Stephen Hagan as Ricky
- Daniel Percival as Dylan
- Skye Bennett as Charlotte
- Linden Ashby as Cross
- Keith David as Lieutenant Colonel Wyaters

== Reception ==
Rob Hunter of FilmSchoolRejects.com says that although the film could have been entertaining, "the idea and the execution are worlds apart" and questions the strange decisions of the survivors. Hunter praises Tanoai Reed as the one bright spot of the film, delivering top-notch fight scenes, even if his acting could do with improvement.

== See also ==
- Vampire film
