= Celebrity Jeopardy! (Saturday Night Live) =

Saturday Night Live sketch series

- Saturday Night Live sketch
- Written by: Norm Macdonald; Steve Higgins
- Starring: Will Ferrell; Darrell Hammond; Six episodes: Jimmy Fallon; Norm Macdonald; Two episodes: Kenan Thompson; One episode each: Alec Baldwin; Drew Barrymore; Jim Carrey; David Duchovny; Dean Edwards; Ana Gasteyer; John Goodman; Tom Hanks; Taran Killam; Lucy Liu; Tobey Maguire; Kate McKinnon; Matthew Perry; Amy Poehler; Winona Ryder; Reese Witherspoon; Horatio Sanz; Molly Shannon; Martin Short; Ben Stiller; Alex Trebek (Cameo); Kristen Wiig
- Total episodes: 15
- Air dates: 1996–2002, 2005, 2009, 2015

Celebrity Jeopardy! is a series of sketches that aired regularly on the television comedy/variety show Saturday Night Live between 1996 and 2002, the years when Will Ferrell was a cast member. It parodies the same-named special event on the television quiz show Jeopardy! that features competition between notable individuals with all winnings going towards charitable organizations, and significant reductions to the game's level of difficulty. Fifteen sketches aired between December 1996 and February 2015: two sketches per season from 1996 to 2002, and one each in 2005 and 2009, when Ferrell returned to the show as host. The sketch was revived for the Saturday Night Live 40th Anniversary Special on February 15, 2015.

Ferrell portrayed Jeopardy! host Alex Trebek. Darrell Hammond also appeared in each sketch, usually portraying Sean Connery, Trebek's "arch-nemesis" who makes crass insults implying a sexual relationship between Connery and Trebek's mother. Norm Macdonald appeared as Burt Reynolds in six sketches. Jimmy Fallon also appeared six times, portraying a different character in each appearance.

On several occasions, Celebrity Jeopardy! sketches have been referenced during actual episodes of Jeopardy!.

== Sketch ==
The participants in each sketch consist of Ferrell, Hammond, the host for the episode, and a third cast member; after Norm Macdonald left the series, the third celebrity would be most frequently played by Jimmy Fallon. The sketch uses a mock-up of the first set designed for the real Jeopardy! by production designer Naomi Slodki (the "sushi bar" set), introduced one month before the first sketch; this set remains in use for all fifteen sketches, including the three return appearances of the sketch after Ferrell's departure, which were produced after the set's basis was retired.

The sketch often begins at the start of the Double Jeopardy! round. Trebek welcomes the audience and, occasionally, apologizes for an offense or incident that occurred before the break. He then introduces the celebrity contestants and reveals their scores, which are either $0, a negative score, or a very low positive score. Many times, the contestants refuse or fail to select an appropriate category and dollar value from the game board, grinding the game to a halt and often requiring Trebek to choose them himself. As the celebrities' growing ineptitude and lack of interest became apparent, the subject matter used for categories shifted from normal topics (such as "Movies" and "Popular Music") to more childish topics, categories with titles giving not-so-subtle hints as to the correct response without reading the clues (such as "Colors that end in 'urple'", "Countries between Mexico and Canada", and "Famous Kareem Abdul-Jabbars"), and those requiring no responses whatsoever (such as "Automatic Points" or "Tie Your Shoe"). Recurring Jeopardy! category "Potent Potables" appears in every sketch but is never selected, and when it finally is chosen, it results in an inadvertently offensive pre-recorded Video Daily Double involving Bill Cosby (played by Kenan Thompson).

Instead of buzzing in with the correct questions, contestants either give wildly incorrect responses or say things that have nothing to do with the game, frustrating Trebek, who does nothing to hide his contempt for the celebrities' performance. Trebek's mood is also exacerbated by Connery's pranks and antics, which include making sexual jokes at Trebek's expense, deliberately misreading or vandalizing the categories on the board to turn them into sexually suggestive phrases (such as "Let It Snow" as "Le Tits, Now" or "Catch These Men" as "Catch the Semen"; or in terms of vandalizing, "I Have a Chardonnay" as "I Have a hardon"), and implying that he has had sexual relations with Trebek's mother.

Trebek eventually grows exasperated with his inability to conduct the show and cuts it short by moving to Final Jeopardy!. He either discards the scripted category in favor of a much easier task (such as having the celebrities write and respond to their own questions), or announces a childishly simple category. Even though it appears impossible for the celebrities to fail, they invariably do. Connery occasionally provides a correct response, yet uses his wager to transform the text into a rude phrase or drawing (such as the letter V which is the Roman numeral for 5, until the V was revealed as part of the whole wager which reads "SucK it Trebek"). Sometimes Connery appears to have sympathy for Trebek until the wager reveal, which happens to be a rude drawing at Trebek's expense.

Trebek is the beleaguered straight man and is generally the only person on stage interested in the game. The contestants, who are either unaware of what the game is or uninterested in playing, will ramble incoherently, deliver irrelevant monologues, or openly antagonize the host. Whenever a contestant takes the game seriously, they prove utterly incapable of supplying the correct question. No contestant ever offers a correct response; however, two come close: Phil Donahue and Tony Bennett, who in their respective sketches, offer descriptions for the holiday of Christmas and The Adventures of Tom Sawyer. When Reynolds, who had initially been the celebrity who appeared in each sketch, makes his return appearances, he misreads categories in the same manner as Connery and insists that he be addressed as "Turd Ferguson" because he finds that name funny.

At the end of almost every sketch, all three celebrities have scores in the negative thousands of dollars, and in most cases, a humorous, often sexual, Final Jeopardy! punchline is delivered by Connery. In one of his sketches, Reynolds is declared an unquestioned winner, even though he wins simply because he has the least amount of negative money, rather than actually earning a victory. When Trebek ends the show, he either states that money will be withheld or taken away from the contestants' charities due to their negative scores, or announces his intention to resign or kill himself.

== Episodes ==
#	Original airdate	Episode	Celebrities impersonated			Notes
1	December 7, 1996	S22:E08	Jerry Lewis	Burt Reynolds	Sean Connery	
2	May 10, 1997	S22:E19	Phil Donahue	Burt Reynolds	Marlon Brando	
3	October 4, 1997	S23:E02	John Travolta	Burt Reynolds	Michael Keaton	
4	May 9, 1998	S23:E20	Minnie Driver	Jeff Goldblum	Sean Connery	
5	October 24, 1998	S24:E04	Tom Cruise	Adam Sandler	Sean Connery	
6	March 20, 1999	S24:E16	Nicolas Cage	Calista Flockhart	Sean Connery	Nicolas Cage finishes with $8
7	October 23, 1999	S25:E03	French Stewart	Burt Reynolds	Sean Connery	Only episode with the four people (Ferrell, Fallon, Macdonald, Hammond) who appeared more than once. Reynolds starts with the highest score on any of the sketches: $14. Macdonald, now hosting, reprises his role as Reynolds.
8	April 15, 2000	S25:E17	Keanu Reeves	Hilary Swank	Sean Connery	Ricky Martin (Chris Kattan) appears in the Video Daily Double and Swank's then-husband Chad Lowe (Chris Parnell) appears in the audience, who is crying to his wife's acceptance speech, a la the 72nd Oscars.
9	December 16, 2000	S26:E08	Robin Williams	Catherine Zeta-Jones	Sean Connery	
10	February 8, 2001	SNL Primetime Extra 2	Ozzy Osbourne	Martha Stewart	Sean Connery	Writing on the sketch originally began the week before it aired. The real Martha Stewart competed on the real Celebrity Jeopardy! the following Tuesday.
11	September 29, 2001	S27:E01	Chris Tucker	Anne Heche	Sean Connery	The real Alex Trebek shaved off his mustache starting with Jeopardy! episodes airing the previous week, but Ferrell's version of Trebek maintained the mustache.
12	May 18, 2002	S27:E20	Dave Matthews	Björk	Sean Connery	Rock & Roll Edition; Connery had recorded an album of "filthy limericks" about Trebek to be eligible. The real Alex Trebek made a cameo appearance at the end of the sketch. Dean Edwards appeared as Boyd Tinsley for performing Matthews' song "Ants Marching" during one answer. The last episode with Ferrell as a regular cast member.
13	May 14, 2005	S30:E19	Bill Cosby	Sharon Osbourne	Sean Connery	Ferrell, now hosting, reprises his role as Trebek.
14	May 16, 2009	S34:E22	Kathie Lee Gifford	Tom Hanks	Sean Connery	A fourth lectern for Reynolds appears for only one round, then he and his lectern mysteriously vanish while no one is paying attention, only to reappear at the end of the sketch; however he has Hulk Hands to revisit the studio. Hanks appeared as himself. Hammond's last episode as a regular cast member.
15	February 15, 2015	40th Anniversary; Special	Justin Bieber	Tony Bennett	Sean Connery	Reynolds (who arrives by "driving" his lectern, which has a steering wheel, steer horns and four car horns on it), Christoph Waltz (Taran Killam) and Matthew McConaughey (Jim Carrey) appear in the middle of the sketch, replacing Bieber and Bennett, respectively. Trebek quickly ends the game without advancing to Final Jeopardy! after a Video Daily Double under Potent Potables features footage of Bill Cosby (Kenan Thompson) preparing a cocktail; in light of Cosby's sexual assault allegations, Trebek apologizes and clarifies that it was filmed in June.

== Cast ==
=== SNL cast members ===
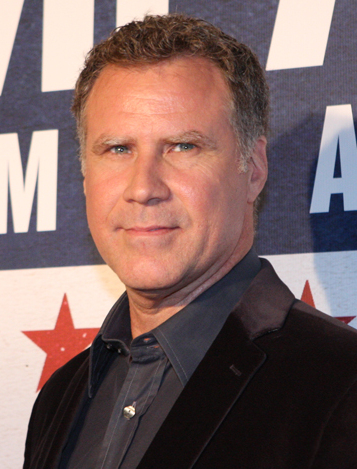
Will Ferrell plays Alex Trebek in the skits.

A typical Celebrity Jeopardy! sketch featured three cast members (two as contestants and Ferrell as Trebek), plus that week's host as a third contestant. The thirteenth edition of the sketch (Cosby, Sharon Osbourne, Connery) featured three members of the SNL cast as the three contestants and Ferrell, now hosting, reprising his role as Trebek. The episode with Connery, Ozzy Osbourne and Martha Stewart featured cast members in all four roles.

- Dean Edwards as Chris Tucker
- Jimmy Fallon as Adam Sandler, Nicolas Cage, French Stewart, Hilary Swank, Robin Williams and Dave Matthews
- Will Ferrell as Alex Trebek
- Ana Gasteyer as Martha Stewart
- Darrell Hammond as Sean Connery, Phil Donahue and John Travolta
- Taran Killam as Christoph Waltz
- Norm Macdonald as Burt Reynolds
- Kate McKinnon as Justin Bieber
- Amy Poehler as Sharon Osbourne
- Horatio Sanz as Ozzy Osbourne
- Molly Shannon as Minnie Driver
- Kenan Thompson as Bill Cosby
- Kristen Wiig as Kathie Lee Gifford

=== SNL hosts ===
Thirteen of the fifteen sketches included the episode's host, usually as a contestant. The tenth sketch was one of two not to feature a host, as it was part of an SNL primetime special that did not feature a guest host. The 40th anniversary special also did not have a host. Both Ferrell and Macdonald were previous cast members who reprised their Celebrity Jeopardy! role upon their return. Notably, two hosts appeared as actual contestants on the real Celebrity Jeopardy!: David Duchovny (in 1995 and 2010) and Martin Short (in 2006).

- Alec Baldwin as Tony Bennett
- Drew Barrymore as Calista Flockhart
- Jim Carrey as Matthew McConaughey
- David Duchovny as Jeff Goldblum
- Will Ferrell as Alex Trebek
- John Goodman as Marlon Brando
- Tom Hanks as himself
- Lucy Liu as Catherine Zeta-Jones
- Norm Macdonald as Burt Reynolds (who changed his name to Turd Ferguson in several sketches, claiming "it's a funny name").
- Tobey Maguire as Keanu Reeves
- Matthew Perry as Michael Keaton
- Winona Ryder as Björk
- Martin Short as Jerry Lewis
- Ben Stiller as Tom Cruise
- Reese Witherspoon as Anne Heche

== Background ==
Norm Macdonald was inspired to create the first Celebrity Jeopardy! after noting how much easier the questions on the real-life Celebrity Jeopardy! were compared to regular episodes. Macdonald acknowledged that his concept would be substantially the same as "Half-Wits," a recurring sketch that originated on SCTV (of which Macdonald was a fan) in which Eugene Levy played a transparently veiled spoof of Trebek, Alex Trebel, who would get exasperated by the incredibly dumb contestants on the program. Macdonald called Levy and secured permission to co-opt the premise of the sketch.

During the May 2007 special Saturday Night Live in the '90s: Pop Culture Nation, Macdonald said he created the Celebrity Jeopardy! sketch purely as an excuse to do his Burt Reynolds impersonation. He purposely chose to make Reynolds an anachronism, appearing on stage as if Reynolds was still the same age he was in 1972. Macdonald also claims that Reynolds was a fan of the sketch and that there were talks to do a sketch where the real Reynolds would crash the game and punch out Macdonald. Reynolds would then play the remainder of the game, with his responses being even dumber than Macdonald's. However, Macdonald was fired from SNL before that sketch could be written. Darrell Hammond (who initially played a different celebrity contestant in every installment) resumed playing Sean Connery from 1998 onwards as the new regular contestant to aggravate Alex Trebek.

The host and contestants are played as caricatures of their real-life personalities. Hammond said that, while his initial Connery impression was as accurate as possible, it would eventually morph into a "bastardization" of the actor, which audiences — and Hammond himself — found far more entertaining. Though Trebek shaved his trademark mustache in 2001, Ferrell retained it as long as he played the character, even in the twelfth sketch — Ferrell's last episode as a cast member — when a clean-shaven real Trebek made a cameo at the end.

== Critical reactions ==
Critical responses to the sketches have been positive. In 2008, Ferrell's portrayal of Trebek was #3 in IGN's "Top 15 Will Ferrell characters".

== Impact ==
Jeopardy! host Alex Trebek mentioned his admiration for Will Ferrell's impression of him in interviews. Trebek also stated that during every taping of the show, he was asked by one of the audience members how he felt about Ferrell's impression, and always replied that he loved it. On several occasions, Celebrity Jeopardy! sketches have been referenced during actual Jeopardy! episodes:

In the May 19, 1999 Celebrity Jeopardy! episode, the Jeopardy! round featured the category "'S' Words", and the Double Jeopardy! round featured "Swords" in the same column (in the first sketch, wherein "'S' Words" is a category, Connery misreads it as "Swords"). During the September 5, 2001, episode, the Double Jeopardy! categories were "Sean Connery", "Surprise Me, Trebek!", "Therapists" (misread by Connery as "The Rapists"), "Things You Shouldn't Put in Your Mouth", "The Number After 2", and "Rhymes With 'Dog'".

The June 27, 2006, show featured the category "Japan-U.S. Relations", which had been misread by Connery as "Jap Anus Relations". In the November 8 and 16, 2006 Celebrity Jeopardy! episodes, categories included "Surprise Me, Trebek!" and "Answers That Start With 'Feb'", respectively (the latter of which is a reference to the category "Months that start with Feb" from the sketch). On the September 24, 2008 episode, the Jeopardy! round featured the category "Stars With Feb, Trebek". When contestant Brian Levinson first selected the category, he did so in a Sean Connery voice. On the November 23, 2009, show, the categories in the Jeopardy! round were "SNL Celebrity Jeopardy!", "States That End in Hampshire", "What Color Is Green?", "Current Black presidents", "Sounds That Kitties Make", and "Twinkle Twinkle Little Word That Rhymes With Star".

A May 15, 2015 Celebrity Jeopardy! featured "The Pen is Mightier", a category about famous authors and their books (which was misread in a Celebrity Jeopardy! sketch as "The Penis Mightier" by Connery, who thought it was a penis enlargement product); and on September 16, 2015, a contestant who did not know the actual answer jokingly guessed "The Love Ballad of Turd Ferguson" during Final Jeopardy!

The Jeopardy! round from the July 8, 2016, episode featured the categories "States That Begin with Californ", "Is That a Hat?", "Catch These Men" (which Connery reads in a sketch as "Catch The Semen"), "A Petite Dejeuner" (a respelling of the category from the sketch which was "A Petit Dejeuner", which Burt Reynolds misread as "Ape Tit Dejeuner"), "'S' Words" (which appeared again after appearing in 1999), and "SNL Cracks Us Up". On July 10, 2019, the Jeopardy! round featured the category "An Album Cover", which Connery reads in a sketch as "Anal Bum Cover".

The category "Surprise Me, Trebek!" appeared again in the Jeopardy! The Greatest of All Time special in 2020. When contestant Brad Rutter picked the category for the first time, he too shouted its name in an imitation Sean Connery voice.

Jeopardy! host and Trebek's successor Ken Jennings is also a fan of the sketches, and jokingly suggested that Kate McKinnon should play him if they are revived with him as host. Categories on episodes since Trebek's death have occasionally continued referencing the SNL sketches, like "Months That Start with Feb" on the February 6, 2023 episode, and the return of "States That End in Hampshire" on July 11, 2024 (after previously being featured in 2009).

== Home video releases ==
The October 1999 Celebrity Jeopardy! sketch featuring Sean Connery, Burt Reynolds, and French Stewart was featured in the SNL Game Show Parodies compilation special from February 2000 and its later home video release. The special was co-hosted by Will Ferrell in character as Alex Trebek alongside Darrell Hammond as then-Who Wants to Be a Millionaire host Regis Philbin, who was briefly mentioned in the April 2000 Celebrity Jeopardy! installment. Two of the three Best of Will Ferrell home video compilations would include Celebrity Jeopardy! sketches, including the Connery/Reynolds/Stewart sketch in 2003's first volume and 2005's Connery/Osbourne/Cosby installment in 2010's third volume.

== Other Jeopardy! sketches ==
Saturday Night Live has parodied Jeopardy! in other unrelated sketches, such as the futuristic parody Jeopardy! 1999 from October 1976, Bob Swerkski's Quiz Masters (featuring Bill Swerski's Superfans) from 1992, Stand Up and Win (a 1992 parody featuring stand-up comedians as contestants), "Das Ist Jeöpardy!" (an episode of Sprockets) from November 1993, and the April 1995 sketch Gapardy, featuring The Gap Girls. Most recently, a sketch parodying a regular Jeopardy! episode aired on the October 4th, 2025 episode, with cast member Andrew Dismukes playing Ken Jennings.

Additionally, various contestant impersonations, including Connery and Reynolds, have appeared outside of Celebrity Jeopardy! sketches with the same cast members.

=== Black Jeopardy! ===
A recurring sketch in more recent seasons is Black Jeopardy!, which debuted in season 39, and whose clues frequently invoke African American stereotypes.

Black Jeopardy! is hosted by Darnell Hayes (Kenan Thompson), and whose contestants often include two stereotypical African American contestants and the third either being a white person, a foreigner of African descent, or someone who is ignoring the game for their own personal agenda. The first two contestants are always played by the regular cast members and always have an African American name, while the third contestant is always played by the guest host and almost always with a more "European" name that catches Darnell by surprise. Among the "third" contestants have been:

- Mark, a professor of African American studies at Brigham Young University. (Louis C.K.)
- Allison, who "understands Black culture because she once dated a Black man" and claims to be "color blind". (Elizabeth Banks)
- Doug, a Donald Trump supporter with a MAGA hat. (Tom Hanks) Doug does surprisingly well until the Final Black Jeopardy! category is revealed as "Lives That Matter"
- T'Challa, Prince of Wakanda. (Chadwick Boseman)
- Jared, a Black Canadian. (Drake)
- Velvet Jones, an African American contestant who promotes his consultation business on how women can make money as prostitutes through numerous books. (Eddie Murphy)

The sketches are implied to take place in an apartment building in a residential neighborhood as opposed to a TV studio, and also have several sponsors pertaining to African American stereotypes, most of them fictional though Sprite was listed as one due to that drink's long association with the National Basketball Association.

== See also ==
- Recurring Saturday Night Live characters and sketches
