= Jamie Kovac =

American actress, body builder, and civil engineer

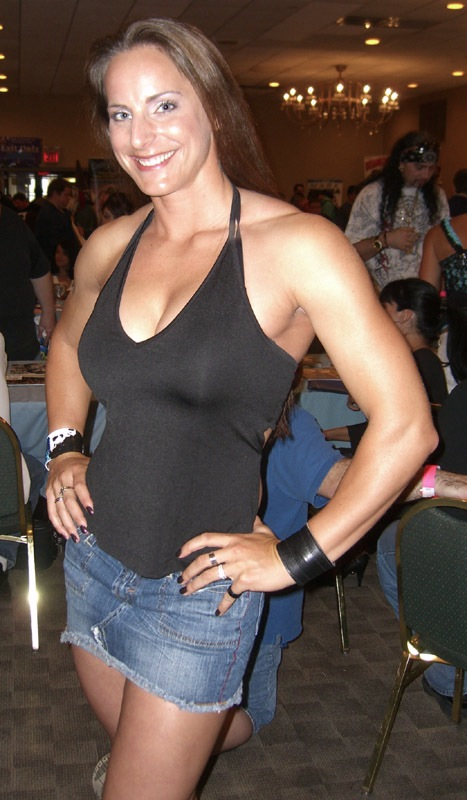
- Kovac at the Big Apple Summer Sizzler in Manhattan, June 13, 2009.
- Occupation: Television actress

Jamie Reed Kovac is an American actress, body builder and civil engineer. She is best known for playing Fury on American Gladiators. Born Jamie Reed, she holds a B.S. in Civil Engineering and a Masters in Engineering Management from Cornell's College of Engineering, and played varsity softball and competed in pole vault on the varsity track and field team. She has also competed in National Physique Committee Figure events, and in 2007 she placed 4th at the NPC National Figure Championships in New York and 3rd at the NPC USA Figure Championships in Las Vegas. In 2010, she won the title America's Strongest Middleweight Woman. She is married to former Cornell Big Red hockey player Frank Kovac.
