= Jennifer Widerstrom =

American personal trainer

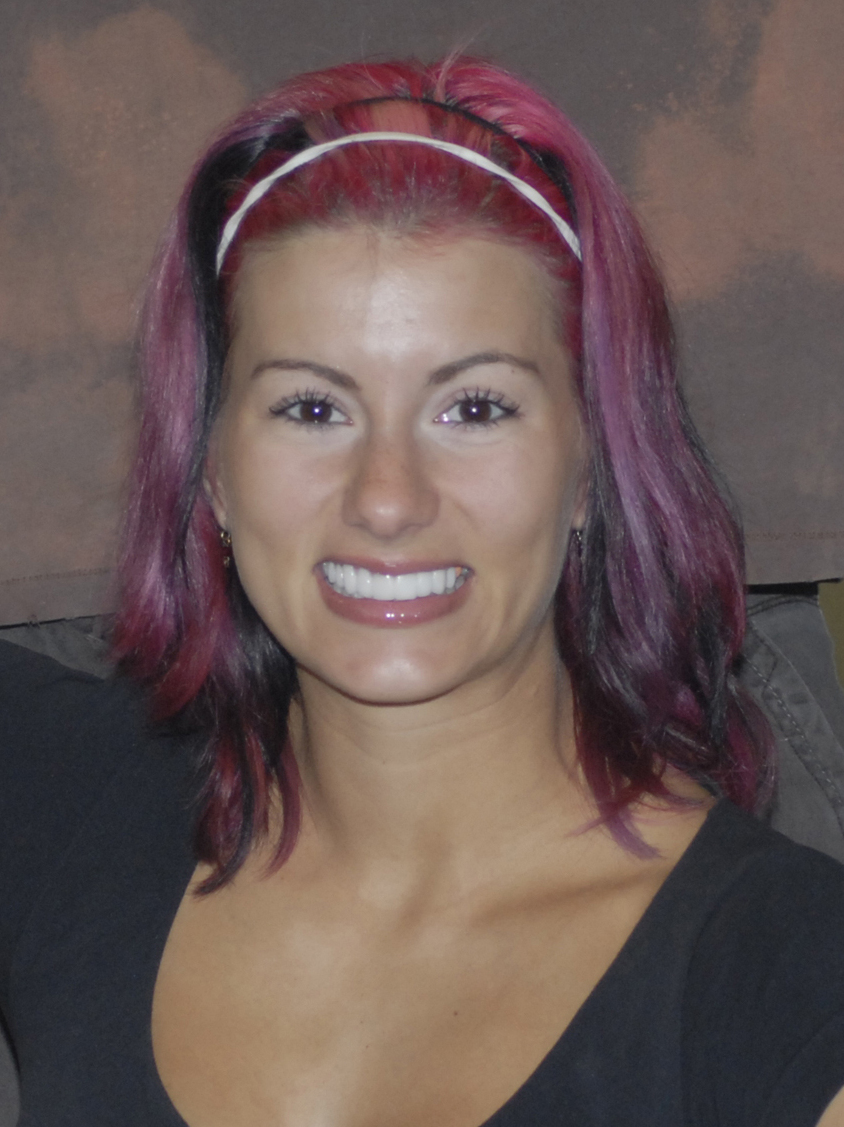
- Widerstrom in 2008
- Born: August 24, 1982 (age 43); Downers Grove, Illinois, U.S.
- Occupations: fitness model, personal trainer
- Height: 5 ft 6 in (168 cm)
- Website: https://jenwiderstrom.com

Jennifer Widerstrom (born August 24, 1982) is an American fitness model and personal trainer. She appears as a trainer on the American version of the television series The Biggest Loser. She appeared on American Gladiators in 2008 as the female gladiator Phoenix. She also appeared in the 2015 documentary Why Am I So Fat?

== Early life ==
Widerstrom was born in Downers Grove, Illinois. She attended the University of Kansas, where she was a hammer thrower.

== Career ==
After graduating, Widerstrom moved to Los Angeles, where she worked towards becoming a personal trainer and fitness model. In 2008, she was discovered by a casting agent for American Gladiator and joined the show's second season as the gladiator Phoenix.

In 2014, Widerstrom joined Season 16 of NBC's The Biggest Loser.

She is a Reebok Global Women's brand ambassador and the author of Diet Right for Your Personality Type.
