= Hulk Hands =

Toy resembling green oversized foam rubber boxing gloves

Hulk Hands are a toy, originally released as part of the merchandise for Hulk in 2003, consisting of large foam-rubber clenched fists into which the wearer inserts their hands. It is based on the Marvel Comics superhero Hulk.

The Hulk Hands are wired so that when they are bashed together or against objects, they emit various smashing or crashing sound effects, as well as occasional Hulk-related roars or catch phrases.

== History ==
Following the success of the Dual Action Web Shooters in 2002, released to promote Spider-Man, Marvel Entertainment subsidiary ToyBiz saw it as an opportunity to adapt another Marvel character's powers as a toy.

Designer Jesse Falcon reflected the Hulk Hands' conception in a 2020 interview, stating that "by the time the 2003 Hulk movie came around, we were also challenging that same thing; how do we take the Hulk and make an experience for a kid that is exactly what this is for Spider-Man?". Because the Hulk doesn't use any peripherals or gadgets, the designers initially considered large, inflatable hands, before pivoting to a foam design.

The original release featured semi-open packaging and large "Try Me" tags, which made them extremely popular with children, but less so with retailers who had to deal with damaged packaging.

After Marvel Entertainment shut down ToyBiz and licensed its properties to Hasbro, Hulk Hands continued to be produced either as part of a standard Incredible Hulk or Avengers line, or to coincide with a Marvel Cinematic Universe film that features a Hulk. These variants had more enclosed packaging but retained the "Try Me" feature.

Screen-accurate Hulk Hands were produced by Hasbro to coincide with the Marvel Studios film The Incredible Hulk in 2008. The "Gamma Green Smash Fists" made for the The Avengers were smaller and a darker green, with the Avengers: Age of Ultron variant "Hulk Gamma Green Fists" featuring open palms, allowing the wearer to loosely grip objects whilst maintaining the ability to clench their fists.

Additional Hulk Hands were produced as part of the merchandise for Captain America: Brave New World, based on Red Hulk, and Spider-Man: Brand New Day.

== Controversies ==
Hulk Hands have been noted for the blunt impact injuries they may cause, which resulted in the product's nomination among the "10 Worst Toys" by the consumer watchdog World Against Toys Causing Harm (WATCH) in 2012 and 2025.

A variant, the Thing Hands, were listed among WATCH's 10 Most Dangerous Toys during the 2005 Christmas season, due to the risk of blunt trauma injuries.

== Similar products ==
Toy Biz also produced Electronic Thing Hands as merchandise for the 2005 Fantastic Four film. The Thing Hands were basically a version of the Hulk Hands colored and textured to resemble those of the Thing, with appropriate sound effects and catch phrases.

Part of the toyline for Disney's 2012 film Wreck-It Ralph included cloth covered "Wrecking Fists" and foam "Smash Hands", both of which produce electronic sound effects.

Bruce Lee Dragon Fists are electronic plush toys that make sounds upon impact.

In addition to the open palmed "Gamma Grip Fists" for the 2015 Age of Ultron toyline, there were "Iron Man Arc FX Armor" hands and "Hulk Buster Gauntlets" as a Walmart exclusive.

== In popular culture ==
Hulk Hands were featured in the 2008 comedy Step Brothers, the 2011 comdey film The Change-Up, The Venture Bros. season 2 episode "Hate Floats", The Big Bang Theory season 3 episode "The Psychic Vortex",The Simpsons season 21 episode "Homer the Whopper", the How I Met Your Mother season 6 episode "Desperation Day", the Rick and Morty season 2 episode "Total Rickall", and the 2020 black comedy The King of Staten Island.

The June 12th, 2008 opening bell of the New York Stock Exchange was rang by Joe Quesada and others wearing hulk hands to promote the film The Incredible Hulk.

The fourth episode of season two of the 2008 American Gladiators series was dedicated to the Hulk as part of a promotion of the 2008 film and Hulk Hands were worn in place of Gauntlet power pads.

In comic A + X #8 (2015) Deadpool turned Hulk Hands into trick arrows that end up greatly resembling Green Arrow's boxing glove arrows in functionality. He then states that the real trick is they were all filled with explosives.

The Hulk Hands became available as an in-game gear in Roblox to coincide with the release of Thor: Ragnarok in 2017.

The Hulk Hands became available as an in-game harvesting tool in Fortnite to coincide with the release of Marvel's Avengers in 2020, periodically appearing in the Item Shop alongside the Hulk outfit.

Hulk Hands were also mentioned in the 2024 Marvel Studios film Deadpool & Wolverine.

== See also ==
- Hulk
