= Valerie Waugaman =

American actress

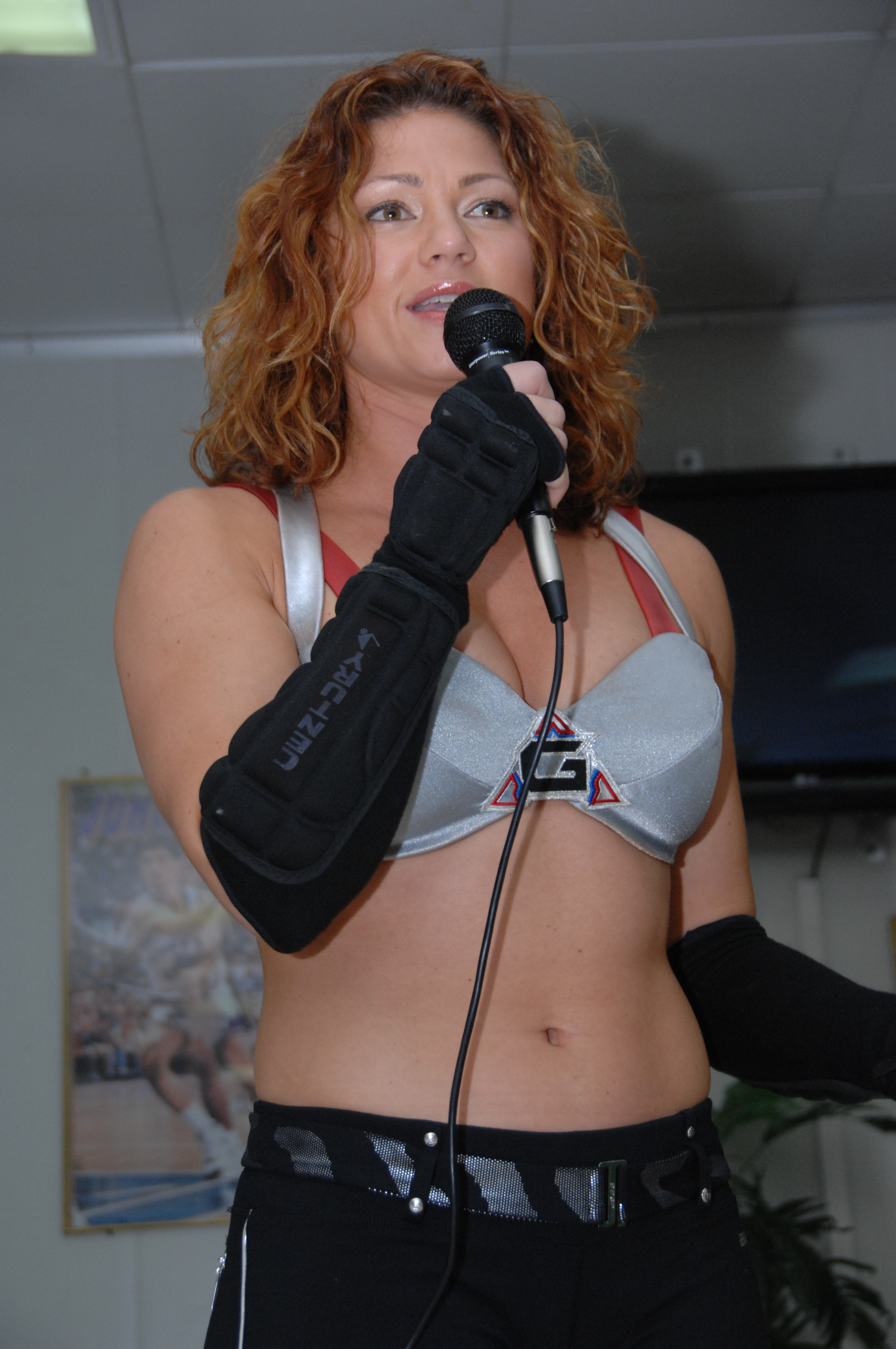
- Born: February 26, 1978 (age 47); Cleveland, OH, U.S.
- Occupation(s): Actress, television personality, bodybuilder
- Website: www.valspace.com

Valerie Waugaman (born February 26, 1978) is a former IFBB Figure Professional and appeared as the Gladiator "Siren" on the 2008 American Gladiators revival.

== Biography ==
Waugaman was born and raised in Cleveland. She has always excelled in sports. In high school track she held six school records and qualified for the Division I State Meet in three events: hurdles, long jump and high jump, winning the Division I State High Jump Championship. Her 30 inches (762 mm) vertical leap helped make her a top player in basketball and volleyball. As a volleyball player she was named a Regional All-Star and Conference MVP.

Waugaman attended Ohio University on a volleyball scholarship and graduated with a BFA degree in Graphic Design and a minor in Photography. After college, she became the Director of Marketing at Octane Café, a fitness-oriented restaurant in Cleveland.

While at the Arnold Classic, Waugaman was inspired by the pro figure women gracing the stage. Soon after, she competed in her first national fitness event in the National Physique Committee (NPC) "Figure" competition. In 2005, she earned her professional status and has been competing ever since in the IFBB Pro Figure Athlete category and has earned three International Pro Figure titles. The exposure in the IFBB has landed her on the covers of fitness magazines: Oxygen, Flex (twice), Muscle & Fitness Hers, Ironman and H2O.

In 2008, Waugaman joined the 2008 season of American Gladiators. In February 2008, she announced her retirement from IFFB competition.

Waugaman is also a motivational speaker and has created a non-profit organization, FitMission, with the goal of educating people about fitness and to inspire them to improve their quality of life. She has her own video series on Bodybuilding.com entitled "Fit Mission Revolution!"

== IFFB Figure Pro competitions ==
2007

- IFBB Houston Pro Figure Contest - 1st Place
- IFBB Colorado Pro/Am Classic Bodybuilding And Figure Contest - 1st Place
- IFBB Olympia - 9th Place
- IFBB Arnold Classic - 5th Place

2006

- IFBB Shawn Ray Colorado Pro - 1st Place
- IFBB Olympia - 12th Place
- IFBB Arnold Classic And Internationals - 8th Place

2005

- IFBB Sacramento Pro Fitness - 2nd Place
- IFBB Olympia - 7th Place
- Europa Super Show - 2nd Place
- NPC 2005 NPC Junior Nationals - 1st Place

== Fitness magazine appearances ==
- Flex (cover)
- Muscle & Fitness
- M&F Hers
- Iron Man
- H2O
- Oxygen (cover)
