= American Gladiators (2008 TV series) =

American television series

- Genre: Sports entertainment game show
- Developed by: John Ferraro; Dan Carr
- Directed by: J. Rupert Thompson
- Presented by: Hulk Hogan; Laila Ali
- Announcer: Van Earl Wright (play-by-play)
- Composers: Jeff Lippencott and Mark T. Williams, Ah2 Music
- Country of origin: United States
- Original languages: English (NBC); Spanish (Telemundo)
- No. of seasons: 2
- No. of episodes: 22

Production
- Executive producers: Howard T. Owens; Mark Koops; David A. Hurwitz; Johnny C. Ferraro
- Producers: Matthew Baxt; Anthony Carbone; Eric Kaufman; Jason Miller
- Production locations: Sony Pictures Studios; Culver City, California (Season 1); Los Angeles Sports Arena; Los Angeles, California (Season 2)
- Editor: Anthony Carbone
- Camera setup: Multicamera setup
- Running time: 60, 90, or 120 minutes
- Production companies: Flor-Jon Films; Reveille Productions; Room 403 Productions; MGM Television

Original release
- Network: NBC; Telemundo
- Release: January 6 – August 7, 2008

Related
- American Gladiators (1989–1996) Gladiators 2000 (1994–1996) American Gladiators (2026–present)

American Gladiators is an American competition television series that aired on NBC and Citytv in Canada. Hosted by Hulk Hogan and Laila Ali, the show matches amateur athletes against each other and the show's own "gladiators" in contests of strength, agility, and endurance. It is a remake of the original series of the same name which ran from 1989 to 1996, with elements of the British version of the 1990s. The show was refereed by Al Kaplon, a former American League umpire, who can also be seen as the referee in Dodgeball: A True Underdog Story. Play-by-play narration was handled by Van Earl Wright.

Two seasons were produced by Reveille Productions and MGM Television, both of which were aired in 2008. The first season was taped at Sony Pictures Studios in Culver City, California. The show moved to the Los Angeles Sports Arena for season two.

== Format ==
Season 1 of the revival featured 24 contenders (12 male, 12 female), while Season 2 had 40 contenders (20 male, 20 female). Men and women compete in separate tournaments, with two men and two women competing in each episode. In each episode, contenders take part in several events against the Gladiators, trying to earn as many points as possible before the final event, the Eliminator. Each point separating the contenders translates into a half-second advantage for the leader (or a half-second handicap for the trailing contender). For Season 1, preliminary round matches consisted of four events plus the Eliminator; semifinals and finals matches were extended to five events plus the Eliminator (by comparison, the original series had either six or seven events plus the Eliminator). The first two preliminary matches of Season 2 had four events plus the Eliminator. All other rounds had six events plus the Eliminator. For 90-minute episodes, all the events were shown in their entirety, but for 60-minute episodes, two events for each gender were shown only in brief "recap" segments; those events could be viewed in their entirety on the NBC website.

In Season 1, the four male contenders and the four female contenders who won their respective preliminary matches with the fastest Eliminator times advanced to the semifinals; the winners of the two semifinals matches competed in the finals. In Season 2, the top six contenders of each gender advanced to the semifinals; after three semifinal matches, the two winning contenders of each gender with the fastest Eliminator times advanced to the finals.

The grand prize in Season 1 was $100,000, a 2008 Toyota Sequoia, and the right to become a Gladiator for Season 2. The cash prize and car remained the same in Season 2, but there was no explicit mention of the contenders becoming Gladiators.

== History ==
After discussions with MGM, NBC confirmed in August 2007 that a revival would be produced by Reveille Productions and MGM Television for a mid-season debut. Shortly thereafter, NBC announced a casting call on its website. The first ad for the revival aired during the Macy's Thanksgiving Day Parade on November 22, 2007. Although some analysts believe that the show was revived in response to talks of an upcoming WGA strike, which was ongoing at the time of American Gladiators' premier, evidence of this is inconclusive.

American Gladiators premiered on Sunday, January 6, 2008, an average of 12 million people watched the two-hour premiere. All other Season 1 episodes aired Mondays at 8:00 ET/PT, except for the finale, which aired Sunday, February 17, 2008, at 7:00 ET/PT. Season 2 premiered May 12, 2008, on NBC, with a two-hour episode. The two-hour Season 2 finale aired on August 4, 2008, at 8:00 ET/PT. While the final two-hour episode of Season 1 was devoted entirely to the finals, the Season 2 finale consisted of the third semifinal round followed by the finals.

New episodes and new cast members were planned for a 3rd season in the summer of 2009, however, NBC canceled those plans in March.

Rights holder MGM was developing an American Gladiators revival, with Seth Rogen and Evan Goldberg on as executive producers, as of August 2018.

The Hollywood Reporter has reported that Johnny Ferraro is to bring back a second revival following the BBC's successful revival of the British version.

== Syndication ==
In August 2008, season 1 of American Gladiators began airing on WKAQ-TV, Telemundo Puerto Rico every Sunday at 8 pm. In September 2008, the first season began airing on Sky1 in the United Kingdom on Tuesday afternoons. In April 2009, Season 2 was broadcast on Sky1 on Saturday evenings. In Australia, American Gladiators started airing on Seven's new free-to-air digital channel 7Two on Wednesdays at 7:30pm from November 4, 2009. The first season was also broadcast in Spain as Gladiadores s.XXI, with dubbed commentary, on Cuatro. Today, the show (plus the original one) can be seen on Hulu. In addition, the series airs on their dedicated channel on Pluto TV.

== Gladiators ==
=== Female gladiators ===
One of the female gladiators on this series, Jennifer Widerstrom, known by the stage name "Phoenix" on this show, later became a fitness trainer on The Biggest Loser, replacing Jillian Michaels.

Alias	Seasons		Birth name	Height and Weight	Information
Alias	First	Last	Birth name	Height and Weight	Information
Crush	1	2	Gina Carano	5'8", 150 lbs (1.70 m, 68 kg)	Professional mixed martial artist and actress
Fury	1	1	Jamie Reed	5'8", 150 lbs (1.70 m, 68 kg)	Jamie Reed “Fury” Kovac is not related to Tanoia Reed (Toa)
Hellga	1	2	Robin Coleman	6'1", 205 lbs (1.83 m, 93 kg)	Actress and professional bodybuilder
Jet	2	2	Monica Carlson	5'7", 130 lbs (1.68 m, 59 kg)	Became Gladiator by virtue of Season 1 women's overall championship
Panther	2	2	Corinne van Ryck de Groot	5'5", 125 lbs (1.63m, 57 kg)	
Phoenix	2	2	Jennifer Widerstrom	5'7", 153 lbs (1.67 m, 68 kg)	
Siren	1	2	Valerie Waugaman	5'9", 145 lbs (1.73 m, 66 kg)	Professional bodybuilder
Stealth	1	1	Tanji Johnson	5'2", 100 lbs (1.55 m, 56 kg)	
Steel	2	2	Erin Toughill	5'10", 156 lbs (1.75 m, 73 kg)	Professional boxer and mixed martial artist
Venom	1	2	Beth Horn	5'8", 137 lbs (1.70 m, 62 kg)	

=== Male gladiators ===
Alias	Seasons		Birth name	Height & Weight	Information
Alias	First	Last	Birth name	Height & Weight	Information
Beast	2	2	Matt Morgan	7'0", 310 lbs (2.13 m, 140 kg)	Professional wrestler who has had long stints with WWE and TNA.
Hurricane	2	2	Breaux Greer	6'2", 230 lbs (1.85 m, 104 kg)	Represented the United States in the 2000 and 2008 Summer Olympics, American record holder for the javelin throw
Justice	1	2	Jesse "Justice" Smith, Jr.	6'8", 290 lbs (2.03 m, 131 kg)	Actor in Thor and Like Mike, professional kickboxer and competitor on WWE's Tough Enough
Mayhem	1	1	William Romeo	6'6", 230 lbs (1.98 m, 104 kg)	Reserve (Season 2)
Militia	1	2	Alex Castro	6'3", 220 lbs (1.88 m, 99.7 kg)	
Rocket	2	2	Evan Dollard	5'10", 160 lbs (1.75 m, 72 kg)	Season 1 Men's Champion
Titan	1	2	Michael O'Hearn	6'3", 263 lbs (1.91 m, 119 kg)	Gladiator captain; Reserve (original version – as "Thor")
Toa	1	2	Tanoai Reed	6'3", 240 lbs (1.91 m, 108 kg)	Tanoai Reed is not related to costar Jamie Reed “Fury” Kovac.
Wolf	1	2	Don "Hollywood" Yates	6'4", 225 lbs (1.94 m, 102 kg)	
Zen	2	2	Xin Wuku	5'9", 160 lbs (1.73m, 72 kg)	Gained fame through the "Urban Ninja" YouTube video.

== Events ==
The following is a list of events featured on American Gladiators. Descriptions of events that were played on the original version of American Gladiators contain only the changes made in the revival and the season the event was introduced in is shown in brackets. Season 1 featured a total of ten events, including the Eliminator, where Season 2 featured seven additional events.

=== Assault ===
In Assault (Season 1), the contenders begin the course holding the ball for use in the first weapon, a slingshot. The second station is a rotating turret that contenders must rotate into position and load themselves. The third station is a sand pit where an arrow is hidden for the crossbow waiting at station four (they complete the station by finding the arrow). Contenders are given a smokescreen at station three to assist in moving to station four. The fifth station consists of throwing three balls at the target. If the contenders hit any part of the target, they earn 10 points. Hitting the target or pushing the button at the end of the course triggers pyrotechnics at the Gladiator's platform, and the Gladiator is rapidly pulled off the platform by a pulley and harness fly system across the arena and into the water tank. If time runs out, or contenders are hit by a ball fired by the Gladiator before hitting the target, they earn one point for each station completed. In Season 2, the turret no longer moves side to side, and a bazooka was added for the third station. Contenders no longer have to fish in the sand for an arrow or load any of the weapons with the exception of the slingshot. If a ball fired by the gladiator bounces off the floor before hitting the contender, the hit does not count.

=== Atlasphere ===
The return of Atlasphere (Season 2), last seen in Season 5 of the original series (1993–94), includes elements from the original series. The competitors begin on ramps, as in Seasons 3 and 4 of the original series, and each contender must roll his/her sphere directly over the sensors in the middle of the pod to release a blast of steam and score 2 points.^{[a]}

=== Earthquake ===
In Earthquake, the contender and Gladiator wrestle on a 12-foot-diameter (3.7 m) platform that is suspended above the floor in Season 1, or the pool in Season 2, and is moved during the event. If the Contender takes the Gladiator off the platform, he or she is declared the winner, even if he or she also comes down in the process. A Contender gets 10 points if he or she pulls the Gladiator down, and 5 points if he or she lasts the entire 30 seconds. Holding on to the wires supporting the Earthquake ring is legal, but kicking or otherwise using the foot to remove the Contender from the ring is not. The event is similar in concept to "Conquer", the second part of "Breakthrough and Conquer".

=== Gauntlet ===
In Gauntlet (Season 1), the contenders earn two points for each of four Gladiators they pass within the 30-second time limit and an additional two points if they can break through a foam wall 10 feet beyond the final Gladiator, for a maximum of 10 points. The rule change is similar to the seventh and eighth seasons of the UK Series. In addition, the Gauntlet is enclosed, so contenders cannot be pushed "out of bounds."

In the Season 2 semifinals, the rules reverted to ones similar to those used in the original US version: contenders earn 10 points for completing the Gauntlet in under 20 seconds, or 5 for doing so within the 30-second limit.

=== Hang Tough ===
In Hang Tough (Season 1) the course is shorter, situated over a pool of water, and has much smaller platforms. Further, the Gladiator is allowed to use the contender's equipment (such as the straps holding the backpack) to pull the contender in. As in the original version, contenders receive 5 points if they are still on the course when the 60-second time limit expires. In Season 2, the course has been lengthened, and contenders must have at least one hand on a blue ring (all rings from the center row to the Gladiator's platform) when time expires in order to earn points for a draw.

=== Hit & Run ===
In Hit & Run (Season 1), which was first introduced in the UK version, the contender traverses a 50-foot suspension bridge hanging above the water tank. Four Gladiators, two on each side of the bridge, attempt to knock the contender off using 100-pound demolition balls. Contenders receive two points for each successful trip across the bridge within the 60-second time limit, and must press a button on the platform to register the points (a difference from the UK version, which required contenders to touch the rail at the back of the platform). Furthermore, there is no penalty for crawling on the suspension bridge, as there was in the UK version, though the referee has instructed contenders to return to their feet in some instances after significant crawling.

=== Joust ===
In Joust (Season 1), the platforms are situated over a pool of water. Gladiators, but not contenders, may be disqualified if both their knees touch the platform simultaneously.^{[b]} Both gladiators and contenders will be disqualified if they step on their opponents platform. If gladiator is knocked off by contender the contender will earn 10 points. If the contestant does not get hit off by 30 seconds then the contender will receive 5 points.

=== Powerball ===
In Powerball (Season 1), the time limit is now 60 seconds. In addition, the playing field is lined with padded walls, which means there is no "out of bounds," and the scoring bins have much wider openings, making tossed balls more effective than the original. For Season 2, caps have been added to the scoring pods to narrow the opening and prevent the contenders from scoring by shooting the ball and the course has been enlarged.

=== Pyramid ===
In Pyramid (Season 1), Modified UK Gladiators rules have been adopted. Contenders earn 5 points for getting their feet atop the Pyramid tier marked with a white dotted line. Pressing the button at the top within the 60-second time limit is worth 5 more points, for a total of 10, and immediately ends the event.

=== Rocketball ===
In Rocketball (Season 2), which is a new event, two Gladiators and two contenders begin the match at the corners of the arena. When each competitor presses a button, they are launched via their harnesses into the air toward two goals at the center of the arena. The contenders try to score by throwing balls into the goals, while the Gladiators play defense. Goals in the lower basket are worth 1 point, while goals in the upper basket are worth 2. The event is similar to an inverted version of the original series event Swingshot.

=== Sideswipe ===
Sideswipe (Season 2) features a series of five platforms, similar in size to those used in Joust. Each end platform has a "bullseye" target, and colored balls attached to the base. The contenders have 60 seconds to pull a ball off one platform, race across the five platforms, and place the ball in the target at the other end; each ball placed in the target earns one point. As in Hit and Run, the Gladiators try to end the event early by knocking the contender into the water. In Sideswipe, though, the Gladiators themselves are the projectiles, swinging on ropes to try to hit the contender.

=== Skytrack ===
The 2008 revival uses the UK rules of Skytrack (Season 2). The two contenders race around one lap suspended upside down from a figure 8 track hanging from the ceiling of the arena. They are chased by two Gladiators, whose goal is to pull a ripcord being trailed by the Contenders. If the Gladiator pulls the ripcord, the contender is released from their carriage and is eliminated from the race. The first contender to cross the finish line earns 10 points. If both contenders cross the finish line, the second place contender gets 5 points. The contenders also face a time limit of 60 seconds. The Gladiators start further away from the contenders so they can have a fair match.

=== Snapback ===
The 2008 version of Snapback (Season 2) is very different from the event of the same name in the original series. In the new version, each contender is connected by a bungee cord to a Gladiator, who stands on a platform behind a 50-foot-long lane. The contenders race toward red buttons at the end of their lanes while the Gladiators resist by pulling back on their bungee lines. Contenders can earn 2, 4, 6, or 8 points based on their progress down the lane when time expires. If they reach the red button at the end of their lane, they earn 10 points and launch their Gladiator into the air (but not into the pool, as in Assault); both contenders can earn 10 points.

=== Tilt ===
The rules of Tilt (Season 2), which is originally from the UK version, are similar to Tug-O-War from the original run of American Gladiators. The Contender and Gladiator begin each match on a platform situated above the pool. The Gladiator's platform is higher than the contender's and is tilted forward. The Contender's platform is tilted backwards to start the match. 5 points are awarded if the Contender can remain on the platform for the entire 30 seconds. The Contender can earn 10 points if they can pull the Gladiator off the platform and into the water. The rope is attached to both Contender and Gladiator by a harness, which removes the possibility of losing by letting go of the rope.

=== Vertigo ===
In Vertigo (Season 2), which was first introduced in the UK version, the contender and Gladiator race across a course of seven flexible poles with handholds and platforms. The game begins with both competitors racing up a laddered pole. Upon reaching the top, they must then sway their pole towards the next, crossing onto it. The winner is the first to complete the course, grabbing a large hoop at the end to return to the ground. Contenders earn 10 points if they beat the Gladiator, or 5 if they reach the scoring zone (the fifth pole or beyond) if the Gladiator wins.

=== The Wall ===
The Wall (Season 1) uses the original format, with a three-section Wall, and contestants given a seven-second head start. The Wall was 40 feet high in Season 1 (an eight-foot increase over the Wall in the original American Gladiators). In Season 2, it was raised to 50 feet, and each contender raced up a separate wall. Contenders and Gladiators cross floating platforms to reach the Wall (the same platforms were used at the beginning of the Eliminator in Season 1). Once the Gladiators begin their pursuit, the platforms are retracted. Contenders that are pulled or fall from the Wall drop into the water. Unlike previous editions, however, contenders earn 5 points if they are still on the Wall when the 60-second time limit expires.

- ^aThe NBC website incorrectly refers to the revived event as "Altrasphere."
- ^bSiren was disqualified for this facing Kim Marciniak. However Crush was not disqualified for going to her knees while facing Koya Webb.

== The Eliminator ==
In both seasons, unlike the original series, contenders do not wear helmets. Also, like most episodes of Season 7 of the original series, no Gladiators are present on the course.

=== Season 1 ===
In Season 1, The Eliminator had these tasks:

- Traverse the floating platforms used in the Wall
- Climb an 8-foot wall. (a rope is provided to help climb up)
- Swim under a fiery surface.
- Climb a 30-foot cargo net.
- Go downward on an inclined barrel roll (A rope is provided to help hold on)
- Use a hand bike to cross a pit
- Run down a balance beam inclined downward
- Run up the pyramid
- Travel down a zipline
- Run up the Travelator (a rope is provided to help climb up)
- Climb a short flight of stairs
- Then crash through the foam wall from gauntlet

=== Season 2 ===
In season 2, The Eliminator had these tasks:

- Jump directly into the pool and swim under the fiery surface.
- Climb up a cargo net.
- Rope swing downward.
- Tightrope walk downward.
- Use a Hand bike to cross over a 6 ft deep ball pit.
- Run across a spinning barrel.
- Climb the Pyramid.
- Travel down a zipline.
- Cross a teeter-totter.
- Run up the Travelator.
- Climb a short flight of stairs.
- Rope swing through a banner into the pool.

== Tournament ==
In Season 1, the four men and four women who had the fastest winning times in the Eliminator moved on to the semifinals. Matchups were determined by seeding based on the preliminary Eliminator results.

In Season 2, the six men and six women with the fastest winning times in the Eliminator advanced to the semifinals, where matchups were determined by seeding based on the preliminary Eliminator results. After three semifinal rounds, the two men and two women with the fastest winning Eliminator times in the semifinals advanced to the finals.
All results are from the NBC official American Gladiators website.

=== Grand Champions ===
Season	Male Champion	Female Champion
1	Evan Dollard	Monica Carlson
2	Tim Oliphant	Ally Davidson

== See also ==
- American Gladiators (original series)
