= List of American Gladiators events =

American Gladiators is an athletic competition game show where contestants, referred to as "contenders", competed against the show's titular Gladiators in a series of physical games called "events" with the goal to be crowned the Grand Champion at the end of the season and win thousands of dollars in cash and prizes.

Over the course of the original series and a 2008 revival, twenty-three events were conceived. Each event was scored, with the objectives for scoring differing from event to event. When the original series premiered in 1989, points were awarded in multiples of five. Following a reconfiguration of the show's format in 1990, points were awarded in numbers ranging from one to ten; this carried over for the remainder of the original series and the 2008 revival.

The number of events per episode ranged from six to eight on the original series depending on the season, while the 2008 revival ranged from five to seven depending on the season and round of play. The one constant was the final event, The Eliminator.

== Assault ==
Years active: 1989–96, 2008

The contender had 60 seconds to hit a target using a series of projectile weapons, while avoiding high-speed tennis balls being fired at them by a Gladiator using an air-powered cannon. The course spanned the entire arena floor with each weapon located at a safe zone that provided some cover for the contender. Each successive station brought the contender closer to the Gladiator's cannon, and traveling to each one required the contender to cross open space where the Gladiator had an unobstructed shot at the contender. The contender's run ended immediately if he/she hit the target or was hit by the Gladiator's fire.

In the first half of season one, there were four safe zones consisting of a pillbox (where the contender started the event, weapon in hand), a burnt out building, a thatch bush, and two oil drums, and four weapons (see chart below). If the contenders hit the bull's eye on the target, which was located at the foot of the Gladiator's platform, they would receive 100 points. Hitting the outer rim was worth less points, originally 60 and rising to 75 by the end of the season. If the contender fired all four weapons unsuccessfully, he/she could take cover in the last safe zone until time expired to earn 30 points for a draw.

From the second half of season one onward, the course consisted of five safe zones and five weapons. The contenders also had to run to the first safe zone instead of starting at it, and the target was moved above the Gladiator's head. A finish line was also added after the last weapon station, and contenders had to cross the finish line within the allotted time in order to earn a draw.

Other changes made over the course of the series:

- For the second half of season one and all of season two, hitting the outer rim of the target was worth seven points and the bull's eye worth ten. Crossing the finish line at the end of the course earned the contender four points and a draw.
- Beginning in season three and continuing for the rest of the original series and the revival, all target hits were worth ten points. If they failed to hit the target, contenders were awarded one point per weapon fired. A draw awarded an additional point for a total of six points.
- Beginning in season five the contenders had to hit an actuator at the end of the course in order to earn a draw.
- In season one of the 2008 series, each weapon had to be loaded by hand and several smaller barriers were added to further aid the contenders. The second season returned to having the weapons pre-loaded, with the exception of one.

Assault Course configurations over the years:

Season	Station 1	Station 2	Station 3	Station 4	Station 5	Draw Criteria	Target Hit Result
Original Run
1a	Rocket launcher	Cannon	Glitter pistol	2 or 3 Hand Grenades	None	Last 60 seconds without getting hit at final safe zone	Gladiator is covered in dirt (males) or glitter (females)
1b	Crossbow	Rocket launcher	Cannon	Pistol	3 hand grenades	Must cross finish line within time limit	Pyrotechnics at foot of Gladiator platform
2	Crossbow	Rocket launcher	Cannon	Pistol	3 softballs	Must cross finish line within time limit	A smoke cannon shoots the Gladiator and their cannon
3 and early 4	Crossbow	Rocket launcher	Cannon	Pistol	Pump gun	Must cross finish line within time limit	Smoke cannon in front of Gladiator
Later 4	Ball rifle	Rocket launcher	Cannon	Crossbow	2 softballs	Must cross finish line within time limit	Smoke cannon in front of Gladiator
5–7	Crossbow	Rocket launcher	Cannon	Arrow rifle	2 softballs	Must hit buzzer at end of course within time limit	Smoke cannon shoots Gladiator
2008 Version
1	Slingshot	Turret Cannon	Rocket search/Smokescreen	Rocket crossbow rifle	3 balls, must be deployed with a button	Press button at end of course within time limit	Pyrotechnics, and Gladiator is launched backward into pool of water
2	Slingshot	Cannon (no longer rotates)	Bazooka/smokescreen	Rocket crossbow rifle	3 balls, must be deployed with a button	Press button at end of course within time limit	Pyrotechnics, and Gladiator is launched backward into pool of water

This event is known in the British series as Danger Zone.

== Atlasphere ==
Years active: 1990–94, 2008, 2026-present

Atlasphere is conducted across the entire arena floor and sees the contenders and Gladiators enter spherical metal cages to do battle in a sixty-second event. The object for the contenders is to roll their spheres into any of four octagonal scoring pods while the Gladiators use their spheres to impede the contenders' progress.

In the first year that Atlasphere was part of the event rotation, the scoring pods had a large circular depression in the middle. The contenders had to roll into the pod and settle their sphere into it for one second in order for a score, which would be indicated by a blast of nitrogen "smoke" from the center of the pod. This caused problems for some contenders as they could not generate enough momentum to get out of the pod and would become stuck for an extended period. For season three, the pods were redesigned to prevent contenders from getting stuck. In addition, an actuator was placed in the middle of each pod and all a contender had to do to score was roll directly over it, which would cause the actuator to depress, which then triggered a ring of chase lights (and, for seasons four and five, a sound effect) and a plume of smoke.

1, 2, or 3 points were awarded for each score, depending on the season and round of play.

After season five of the original series, Atlasphere would not be played again until season two of the 2008 series. For the final two seasons of the original series, Snapback took its place in the event rotation.

This game returned in season 1 of the 2026 Prime Video revival.

== Breakthrough & Conquer ==
Years active: 1989–96, 2026-present

Breakthrough & Conquer is a combination of American football and freestyle wrestling. The event is divided into two parts, each scored separately. This was also an event that the show did not initially allow female contenders to compete in; for portions of the preliminary rounds in 1989 a different game was played off screen (see Swingshot).

In Breakthrough, the contender begins at the 15-yard line of an artificial turf field and has to carry a football into the end zone for a touchdown. A Gladiator is positioned inside the five-yard line and must remain there until the contender reaches them. The contender scores by getting any part of the ball over the goal line without being tackled, going out of bounds, or losing hold of the ball.

The contender then moves over to a circle to grapple with a second Gladiator for 10 seconds (15 in season four). The contender can win Conquer by forcing any part of the Gladiator's body to touch the floor outside the circle. If the contender is forced out, they can re-enter the circle and keep grappling until time expired.

In the first half of season one, 30 (later 40) points were given for each successful part, and a contender earned bonus points if they were successful at both parts for a total of 100 points. From that point forward, 5 points were given for each successful portion of the event (although 3 were given during a point in season three).

During the second semifinal round of the first half of season one, Breakthrough and Conquer was the penultimate event before the running of The Eliminator and the Conquer circle was lifted off the floor, effectively making it a platform. This meant that instead of just managing to force a part of the Gladiator's body outside of the circle, in order to win the event the contender had to physically move the Gladiator off of the elevated circle and have their feet touch the floor. For safety, a blue padded mat was placed on the floor surrounding the circle.

While the men played the event without consequence, the women's competition did not fare as well. In one round, Gladiator Sunny suffered a severe knee injury when contender Tracy Phillips caused her to land awkwardly after pulling her off of the elevated circle from the front. The Conquer circle was lowered back down for contender Joanna Needham's turn, but she suffered a serious shoulder injury during her attempt at Breakthrough and was forced to drop out of the event and the Eliminator that followed.

This game was not played in Season 1 of the Prime Video revival, but as two seasons were initially recorded, it will be played in Season 2.

== Crash Course ==
Years active: 2026-present

This event is a 'Level Up' modification of classic event Atlasphere, in which the contenders are sent off in their Spheres side-by-side, and they have to navigate around the arena floor to the finish line while two Gladiators are trying to impede their progress in their own Spheres. 10 points to the contender who makes it to the finish first after two laps, and 5 points for the second if they finish within 10 seconds of the first contender, otherwise no points are scored.

== Collision ==
Years active: 2025-present

This game is based on the events "Hit and Run" and "Sideswipe." Unlike in Hit and Run, the balls are replaced by four of the Gladiators themselves, Just like in Sideswipe. The Gladiators' mission is to prevent the Contender from crossing the bridge by launching themselves towards the Contender from the side platforms and knock this off. For every time the contender successfully manages to cross, and returns a ball to a basket, they are awarded two points. The Gladiators are allowed to just knock off the Contender off the bridge by swinging towards them, but not allowed to get their legs to "scissors hold" and grab them off, neither are they allowed to leave their trapezes when swinging. The contender must keep moving at all times.

This event will debut in the Prime Video version.

== Earthquake ==
Years active: 2008, 2025-present

In Earthquake, a contender and Gladiator attempt to throw each other off of a moving twelve-foot circular platform above the arena floor and either onto crash mats (2008 season one and 2025 season one) or into water (2008 season two). In order to win the event, one has to have their opponent be completely removed from the platform and not be hanging onto anything supporting it.

The contender receives ten points for throwing the Gladiator off the platform and five for lasting the entire thirty seconds.

This game was not played in Season 1 of the Prime Video revival, but as two seasons were initially recorded, it will be played in Season 2.

== The Edge ==
Years active: 2025-present

First used on the 2023 UK revival, contender and gladiator are raised off the arena floor on a criss-cross grid of one-meter wide walkways. Contender and gladiator start on opposite platforms, and the aim for the contender is to reach the opposite platform as many times as possible, without being knocked off "the edge" or through the middle by the Gladiator.

== Gauntlet ==
Years active: 1993–96, 2008, 2025-present

In this event, the contenders have to run through a half-pipe chute while avoiding five Gladiators, all holding blocking pads to impede the contender's progress. In the first version, 25 seconds were given to start. If the contender made it out in time or without being forced out of the chute, they earned 5 points. If they made it out in under 20 seconds, 10 points were awarded.

In the final season of the original series, the event was played with four Gladiators, and the time limits were reduced to 15 seconds for 10 points, and 20 seconds for 5.

For the 2008 series, the contenders were given thirty seconds to negotiate the Gauntlet, which was redesigned to take away the Gladiators' ability to push the contenders out of the chute. For the first season and the preliminary rounds of the competition, contenders received two points for passing each Gladiator for a total of eight, and then two more for breaking through a wall at the end after passing the last Gladiator. For the remainder of the series, the timed scoring rules were revived with contenders receiving ten points for escaping within twenty seconds and five for escaping within thirty.

== Hang Tough ==
Years active: 1990–96, 2008, 2025-present

Hang Tough sees the contenders and Gladiators use a series of hanging gymnastic rings to swing themselves from one side of the arena to the other with the object for the contender being to reach and land on a platform on the opposite side while trying to avoid being taken off the rings by a Gladiator or falling off on their own.

The contenders are given sixty seconds to reach the opposite end and received ten points if they succeed. If they last the whole sixty seconds and are still on the rings, they receive five points for a draw unless the official determines that they did not make enough of an effort to advance, resulting in no points being awarded; this rule was instituted after several early playings saw contenders only go out a short distance from their platform. It also gave rise to a short-lived seven point draw possibility, which required the contender to advance to the closest rings to the Gladiator's platform (which were color coded).

In the 2008 Revival Contenders were awarded five points for reaching the red ringed zone (at the halfway mark) in sixty seconds.

Contenders are required to continue moving as long as they were not stuck on one ring or engaged with a Gladiator, and neither the contender nor the Gladiator can stay in one place for more than ten seconds. Gladiators are not allowed to contact the contenders above the shoulders or pull the contestant down by their uniform, or they would be disqualified.

Hang Tough debuted on the 1990 alumni show season premiere, but did not join the event rotation until the second half of the season began in 1991.

This event will return on the Prime Video revival.

== Hit & Run ==
Years active: 2008, 2025-present

Hit & Run was one of several events that the 2008 series adopted from the UK series.

The event took place on 50-foot (15 m) suspension bridge hanging above a water tank. At each end of the bridge was an actuator and each time a contender crossed the bridge and pushed it, two points were scored. Meanwhile, four Gladiators attempted to knock the contenders off by throwing 100-pound wrecking balls at them. The contenders were allowed to duck to avoid the balls but had to remain standing at all times otherwise. The event went on for sixty seconds or until the contender fell from the bridge.

== Human Cannonball ==
Years active: 1989–90 (through first half of season two), 1992–93

The object of this game was simple: swing on a rope from an elevated platform and try to knock a Gladiator off a pedestal some distance away. The Gladiator was given a blocking pad for protection.

Originally, three Gladiators played this event and contenders received three swings. For the first half of season one, each successful swing was worth 30 points and 10 bonus points were given if the contender managed to knock all three Gladiators off the pedestal. In the second half of season one, this was reduced to three points for each swing and one bonus point for knocking all three off. After that, two Gladiators competed in the event and contenders were given five points for each successful swing.

After the preliminary round in the first half of season one, a rule was added that forbade contenders from leaving a tucked position while swinging; the rule was put in place out of safety concerns raised after Gladiator Malibu suffered a gash caused by contender Brian Hutson hitting him in the face with his feet extended. Any contender who did not remain in this position for the entire swing had the results of their swing disallowed. A first season addendum also called for removal from the event for a second offense, which happened to contender Elden Kidd in the second half of the season when he committed two fouls against Gladiator Titan.

Human Cannonball was replaced by Hang Tough in the rotation after the first half of season 2, and was brought back in season 4 before being retired.

== Joust ==
Years active: 1989–96, 2008, 2025-present

The Joust sees the contender and Gladiator face off against each other with pugil sticks for thirty seconds.

In the first half of season one, the event was conducted on an apparatus resembling a bridge. To win the event, either the contender or Gladiator could knock the other off of the bridge or advance on them and try to get them to cross a line behind them. This was supposed to trigger a trap door, which would open and drop the loser onto the floor, but it rarely worked properly. In addition, each contender was guaranteed points regardless of the result. The scale started at 30 points and increased by 5 for every five seconds a contender stayed in the bout. Draws were worth 75 points and a victory was worth 100.

Beginning in the second half of season one and continuing across the remainder of the original and revival series, the object became to knock the opponent off of a pedestal onto a crash pad (original series) or into a pool (revival). Ten points were awarded for a win, with five for a draw.

Several things could result in a disqualification, such as:

- dropping the pugil stick
- failing to keep both hands on one's own stick (initial half-season only)
- actively grabbing the opponent's stick out of their hands
- touching the opponent's pedestal with any part of the body
- failure to mount an offensive effort
- both knees touching the pedestal (2008 revival only)
- losing one's protective helmet

In the second half of season three, the contenders and Gladiators began wearing gloves while Jousting. This rule was instituted after contender Marek Wilczynski had to have the tip of one of his fingers amputated when it got jammed against his pugil stick.

Internationally this event is known as Duel.

This game will return for the upcoming Prime Video revival.

== The Maze ==
Years active: 1991–93

A giant maze was constructed across the entire length of the arena floor, and the contenders were given 45 seconds to negotiate their way through it. Inside were four Gladiators, armed with blocking pads to impede their path. To aid the contenders each Gladiator was restricted to a particular area in the maze and could not chase the contenders past it. In each playing of The Maze, there were only two correct paths to take, and with movable partitions inside the maze those two paths were different each time.

The first contender to escape in time earned 10 points. If both contenders made it out before time expired, the second contender was awarded five points. In order to receive points, a contender had to be outside of the structure with both feet on the floor before the clock hit zero.

== Powerball ==
Years active: 1989–96, 2008, 2025-present

Regarded as a signature event of the whole series, Powerball is an event where the contenders attempt to score by depositing red and blue colored balls (originally rubber play balls, then soccer balls and then much smaller Nerf balls) into a series of upright plastic cylinders while trying to evade three Gladiators who defend the playing field.

In the first half of season one, Powerball was conducted on a half-circle shaped field with two bins filled with balls at one end and the scoring cylinders laid out on the edge of the circle at the other end. Each score was worth 15 points and for 45 seconds, the contenders would grab balls from their respective bins and try to score while the Gladiators attempted to stop them by any means possible (tackling, pushing the contender out of bounds, etc.) so long as they were not excessively rough with the contenders; if any Gladiator was determined to have violated this rule, the contender was rewarded with a score.

In the second half of the season, the Powerball field was extended to take up the entire length of the arena floor and the layout of the scoring cylinders changed and one was placed in the middle of the field, with any ball deposited there worth more points. In addition, the ball bins were placed on opposite ends of the field and the contenders had to alternate which bin they chose balls from. The Gladiators were not allowed in these areas. Also, penalties for rough contact now resulted in a Gladiator being removed from the event and all tackling was banned; with the exception of the tackling ban, these rules remained in place for the remainder of the original series (Gladiators were forbidden to tackle above the shoulders, though).

In the second half of the first season, goals in the four outer cylinders were worth one point and the center cylinder was worth two. After that, the scoring varied from 1–3 points for outer goals and 2–5 for center goals depending on the season and round of play.

For the second season, the scoring cylinders were redesigned. The original season's cylinders were narrow, flat-bottomed, and had a tendency to fall over during play. It was also possible for a cylinder to become so full with balls that it could no longer be used during a game, and on several occasions the weight of contenders and Gladiators falling on them would cause the plastic to break, stopping play while a replacement was brought out. The redesigned cylinders were wider and able to hold more balls, and a rounded bottom prevented the cylinders from completely toppling over with contact.

The 2008 series' Powerball game was played for 60 seconds on a field had a retaining wall placed around it, which took away the out of bounds option for the Gladiators. For the first season, goals were worth two points for the outer cylinders and three for the center, and the cylinders had wider openings to encourage contenders to attempt to toss their scoring balls into them. The second season discarded that in favor of the original cylinder style and goals were reduced to one point for the outer cylinders and two for the center.

Super Powerball (1992–93)

Introduced in season four of the original series, Super Powerball was a variant on the original event played with two Gladiators and three scoring cylinders laid in a straight line in the middle of the field. Three points were awarded for goals in the left or right cylinders, and five points were awarded for center cylinder goals. If a Gladiator committed a violation the contender was credited with a score.

This event will return on the Prime Video revival.

== Pyramid ==
Years active: 1993–96, 2008

The contenders faced a pyramid made out of tiered crash mats and were given 45 seconds to try to ascend it. Two Gladiators stood in their way, attempting to prevent them from reaching the top. At the top of the Pyramid was an actuator (originally a ring bell) that the contenders were required to hit to score. The first contender to do so scored ten points, and the second contender to do so earned five points.

The 2008 series increased the time limit to 60 seconds and adapted a rule from the British series for scoring purposes. The fourth tier from the top was marked with a white dotted line, referred to as the "scoring zone". Contenders earned five points for reaching this level; if one of them reached the summit and hit the actuator before time ran out, that contender scored five additional points and the event ended. The British series called the fourth tier from the top the "safety step" and instituted this after Diane Youdale, who portrayed female Gladiator Jet, was forced to retire from the series after suffering an injury on their Pyramid. The rule that the Gladiators could not chase contenders above the step was not adopted as contenders would have an unfair advantage.

Also in 2008, the Pyramid became part of the Eliminator course at the end of each episode. (See the Eliminator section below.)

== Rocketball ==
Years active: 2008

Rocketball was an event that saw the contenders face off against two Gladiators in a high flying basketball game, in an almost reversed version of Swingshot.

Each player was attached by harness to a bungee cord. The contenders each had a bin of colored balls that they would try to place in one of two colored baskets, one red and one yellow, hung from the ceiling of the arena. To do this, they would press a button on the stage floor which would launch them toward the baskets. The Gladiators, meanwhile, had buttons of their own and would use theirs to launch themselves up to play defense.

The process repeated itself for sixty seconds. For each ball the contenders put in the red basket, which was the higher basket, two points were awarded. Each ball in the lower yellow basket was worth one.

== Sideswipe ==
Years active: 2008

A new event for Season 2, Sideswipe has both contenders hopping or running from platform to platform above the water as they try to take a colored ball from a container on one end of a line of five platforms and deposit it in a "bullseye" goal at the other end. While the contestants are transporting the balls, three Gladiators try to knock them off the platforms by swinging at them on rope swings – with the Gladiators themselves being the projectiles.

== Sky Track ==
Years active: 1992–95, 2008

In the version of Sky Track played on the original series, the contenders and a Gladiator raced each other on an inverted, Velcro-covered track. Using their hands and feet (each covered in Velcro to assist in moving), they would move down the track to the opposite end, hit an actuator button, then turn around and head back to the start/finish line.

There were three possible outcomes to every race and they were scored in the following manner.

- Gladiator finishes first: the contender who crossed the line in second place received five points.
- One contender finishes ahead of Gladiator: the contender is awarded ten points for winning the event.
- Both contenders finish ahead of Gladiator: the first contender to finish receives ten points, and the second receives five.

The 2008 series adopted the format used on the British series. Here, both contenders were chased by a Gladiator over a figure-eight shaped track and had to make one lap around the track. Each contender wore a harness with a ripcord on it, which the Gladiators would try to grab. If they did, the contender would be disconnected from the track and lose the event. Ten points were awarded for completing the course first, with the second contender receiving five.

== Snapback ==
There were two different events called Snapback played on American Gladiators. The first one debuted in season six of the original series, replacing Atlasphere in the event rotation, and was played for the remainder of the series. The second was part of the 2008 series.

Original Snapback

The contenders faced two Gladiators, with all attached to bungee cords. The object was to run out onto the field of play and grab large red and blue scoring cylinders that were hung above the field, using the bungee cord for assistance. The Gladiators tried to impede the progress of the contestants and/or knock the cylinders away.

Once the contender had a cylinder, they would bring it back to a large scoring bin and drop it in if they kept possession of it. The red cylinders were hung lower than the blue ones and were worth two points (later one) for each one retrieved. The higher-hanging blue cylinders were worth three points (later two) as they were tougher to grab.

2008 Snapback

The 2008 edition saw the contenders try to hit a red button at the end of a 50-foot-long (15 m) lane. Each contender was attached to a Gladiator with a bungee cord, with the Gladiator providing resistance by pulling on the cord from a platform above the floor. Contenders were given thirty seconds to reach the buttons, and if they did the Gladiators would be launched across the arena. There were four scoring zones along each lane, and if any part of the contender's body was in one of those zones, which ranged from two to eight points in two-point increments, when time expired they received that number of points.

== Swingshot ==
Years active: 1989, 1991–96

The contenders faced three (later two) Gladiators in a 45 (later 60) second event. The object for the contender was to jump from a platform using a bungee cord, use their momentum to propel themselves from the floor to a cylinder with red, yellow, and blue colored scoring balls, grab one, then spring back to their platform and deposit them in a bin. The Gladiators were there to try to block the contenders from doing so.

1 point was awarded for each yellow ball grabbed, since they were the lowest level and easiest to grab. The blue balls were on the second level of the cylinder, and were worth 2–3 points. The red balls were highest on the cylinder and were worth 3–5 points. Contenders were required to jump off their platforms immediately once in the position to jump, and could not throw off a Gladiator's timing by "faking" a jump. If they did, any balls they scored on the ensuing jump would not count.

In the first half of season one, the Swingshot game was strictly played by the female contenders and Gladiators in the early rounds of play in place of Breakthrough and Conquer. Due to time constraints in the first season, not all events were shown, and footage of the first version of the game was never shown, only how the contenders did. The game was eventually discarded in favor of having the women play Breakthrough and Conquer with the men, so there is no record other than the offhanded mentions of how the game was played in the first season. Swingshot was then rested, and returned with modifications for its televised debut in 1991.

== Tug-O-War/Tilt ==
Years active: 1993–96 (as Tug-O-War), 2008 (as Tilt)

The contender faced a Gladiator in a two-man tug of war on tilting platforms for thirty seconds.

In the original series, the platforms were at equal height and the contender started tilted back with the Gladiator starting tilted forward. The object was to pull the Gladiator off the platform, which was worth ten points. A flag was placed in the middle of the rope and the contender could earn five points for a draw if they stayed on the platform for the entire thirty seconds and had the flag on their side of the arena. Neither the contender nor the Gladiator could let go of the rope, as doing so would result in a disqualification.

In the 2008 series, which saw the event adopt its British series' name, the rope was attached to two harnesses worn by the contender and Gladiator and the Gladiator's platform was raised above the contender's to put them at a disadvantage. Ten points were awarded for a win and staying on the platform for the entire thirty seconds earned the contender a draw.

== Vertigo ==
Years active: 2008

Vertigo was another UK series import added to the 2008 series rotation.

The event was a race between the contender and Gladiator on a course of seven poles hung from the roof of the arena. Each participant had their own set of poles to traverse. The race started with the contender and Gladiator climbing up the first pole, and from there they had to maneuver from pole to pole and reach a hoop at the end of the course. The first to pull their respective hoop won the race.

The contenders earned ten points for winning. If the Gladiator won, the contenders could still add five points if they had reached the fifth pole before the race ended.

== The Wall ==
Years active: 1990–96, 2008, 2025-present

The Wall sees contenders trying to ascend a rock-climbing wall without being pulled off by a pursuing Gladiator. The original series conducted the event on a 32-foot (9.8 m) structure. The height of the wall during the first season of the 2008 series was 40 feet (12 m) high, and it was extended to 50 feet (15 m) for the second.

Debuting in the second half of season one, the time limit for The Wall was two minutes. The contenders were also given a head start on the Gladiators, with the men receiving fifteen seconds and the women ten. Beginning in season two, and continuing across both the original and revival series, the limit was set at one minute. Originally, the head starts were carried over and both men and women contenders received ten seconds with the exception of a brief spell in season four when fifteen seconds were given.

In season five of the original series, The Wall was given an overhaul. The Wall was divided into five sections, with grips placed on the dividers so participants could cross between sections. The contenders started in the second and fourth sections, respectively, while their assigned Gladiators started in the outermost sections. The contenders and Gladiators each started climbing their assigned partitions, with no head start for the contenders. To pull their contender off the Gladiators had to cross over at least once. The contenders, meanwhile, were able to cross over to the center partition and force their Gladiator to cross two partitions to pull them down. When the series returned in 2008, The Wall's previous format returned with it but with only a seven-second head start given.

Ten points were given to the first to successfully ascend The Wall and five were given to the second if both made it. For the first two seasons (and very briefly in season four), the higher advancing climber earned five points if both were pulled off. The 2008 series awarded five points for staying on The Wall without being pulled off for the entire time (Inspired by UK gladiator).

This game will return for the upcoming Prime Video revival.

== Whiplash ==
Years active: 1993–96, 2025-present

The contender and Gladiator stand atop a 20-foot (6.1 m) diameter circular platform, with each participant having one hand strapped to a handle of a triangular apparatus referred to as the “dog bone”. The event is played for thirty seconds, with contender and Gladiator pulling on their sides of the bone in an attempt to break the other's grip and thus “own the bone”. Neither participant can place their free hand on the bone, and doing so will result in a disqualification.

For the first two seasons of Whiplash, each participant had different objectives. The contender could win by either “owning the bone” or using it to pull the Gladiator off of the platform, scoring ten points in either instance. All the Gladiators were required to do was remain on the platform for the full thirty seconds to win, although they could also win by “owning the bone”. For the seventh season, the rule was changed and the Gladiator could only win by “owning the bone”. If the Gladiator was still on the platform when time expired, the contender was awarded five points for a draw.

This event will return for the Heats in the Prime Video revival.

== The Eliminator ==
The Eliminator serves as each episode's final event and is the only event where the contenders faced off directly with each other instead of against the Gladiators. Initially, the Gladiators would still participate but as the years went on they were involved less and less.

The Eliminator is an obstacle course laid out over the entire arena floor. The obstacles used varied from year to year.

=== 1989–91 ===
For the first two seasons the Eliminator was played for points like every other event. Both contenders started at the same time and had to complete the course within a time limit. That limit was sixty seconds for the men for the first two seasons, while the women had sixty in the first season and seventy-five in the second.

The points scale was different from the other events. A contender's score was determined by how much time was left on the clock when the course was finished. Each second earned the contender two points (five in 1989). However, there were penalties assessed to contenders if they either failed to complete obstacles in the proper manner or fell off of them. These added five seconds to the contenders' finishing time for each violation, which meant a loss of ten points from the overall Eliminator score (twenty-five in 1989).

Prior to the Eliminator, the deficit between the leader and the opponent was divided by the appropriate point scale and in order for the trailing contender to win the match, he/she needed to not only finish the course first but do so in enough time (once penalties were factored in) to earn enough points to overtake the leader. For example, in the first half of season one, a trailing contender behind by 25 points would need to make up five seconds. In the second half of the season a ten-point deficit would require the same amount of time.

Once both contenders finished the course and the scores were totaled, the contender leading won the match and advanced in further play. If the match ended in a tie, the contender with the faster Eliminator time won.

On the occasion that a contender was unable to run the Eliminator due to injuries sustained in the earlier parts of the competition, the opposing contender automatically advanced to the next round. In the preliminary rounds, that contender would be required to run the Eliminator as seeding for the quarterfinals were determined by score totals from the preliminaries. If a contender was forced to withdraw before the Eliminator at any subsequent point in the competition, the opponent would advance by forfeit and no Eliminator run would take place.

The first season's Eliminator was run in a manner where the contenders started at the front of the arena, with the course layout bringing them back around to the front for the finish. It featured the following obstacles:

- An inclined ramp that the contestants climbed while pushing giant medicine balls, which had to be placed in holders at the top
- A pair of pits to cross:
  - First pit crossed with a balance beam, with six Gladiators swinging smaller medicine balls at the contenders to impede progress
  - Second pit crossed with a rope walk, referred to as "commando ropes/lines"
- The "swing for life", a rope swing over a small wall
- A set of cylindrical "cones" which had to be weaved through
- A corridor for each contender that featured two paper barriers at the end to select; one would allow the contender to cross the finish line unimpeded, while the other was blocked by one of the Gladiators with a blocking pad

For the second half of season one, the two pits were lengthened and the ropes were adjusted in the second pit to aid taller contenders. In addition, the corridors before the finish line were made much narrower, and only one of them was not impeded by a Gladiator.

For season two, the Eliminator saw an overhaul with new obstacles and the finish line was moved from the front of the arena to the back. These were the changes made:

- Two reverse treadmill belts were built into the ramp, and contenders were given three chances to reach the top before being allowed to walk upon the side
- To get across the first pit a hand bike was used
- The balance beam was used to cross the second pit, with a Gladiator at the end of each beam with a weighted blocking pad waiting
- A 20-foot (6.1 m) cargo net climb to a platform, where the contenders rode a zip line back to the floor
- Two track hurdles were placed in front of the corridors, which were otherwise unchanged

=== 1991–93 ===
From the third season on, the Eliminator was no longer scored. Instead the leading contender was given a head start of half a second for each point by which they led entering the event; the trailing contender had to make up the deficit. Whoever finished the course first won the match.

With the third season came some changes, many of which remained in place for season four. The layout of both courses, with corresponding changes, follows:

- Falling off the hand bike resulted in a ten (women) or seven (men) second penalty before the contender could climb back on the course. Gladiators enforced the penalty.
- The balance beam was removed and replaced by spinning cylinders. Falling off the apparatus forced contenders to use an unsteady rope ladder to climb back up.
- The old corridors were done away with in favor of several new obstacles.

In the early episodes of season three, the first obstacle after the zip line was a padded wall with a step at the bottom to aid the contenders in climbing over. Once over the wall, two Gladiators stood holding giant medicine balls to form a gauntlet that would impede their path temporarily. After that, a climb over a short hurdle led to a straightaway, which the contenders would run down while two more Gladiators stood on a platform above the straightaway with their own giant medicine balls to throw at them. The producers decided to change the layout of the course shortly after the season started and removed the gauntlet. The contenders now had to climb over one additional wall, which was also padded and had ropes attached to it to aid the contenders, and the short hurdle at the front of the straightaway was removed and replaced by the stepped wall.

Once past the straightaway, the contenders climbed over one final hurdle and from there had a short run to the end of the course, with the first contender to break through a piece of yellow tape and cross the finish line winning the match and advancing in the tournament. In season three, the distance between the final hurdle and the finish was short enough that contenders could make desperate leaps to try to cross the line first; it also was possible for a contender to win without breaking the tape so long as some portion of their body crossed over the line first. This happened in the men's Grand Championship match during that same season, as eventual champion Mark Ortega vaulted over the final hurdle just as runner-up Joseph Mauro went to break the tape; Ortega landed on the floor with his arm across the line just before Mauro was able to break through and was declared the winner after a video review.

In season four, the sequence following the zipline returned to using one wall; this wall was made of Plexiglas and would be used for the remainder of the series. Season four also saw the return of the gauntlet as an obstacle; this time, a series of blocking pads were attached to poles that swung back and forth with handles operated by two Gladiators. The final hurdle was set back further from the finish line, making it extremely difficult for contenders to make the desperation leaps they were able to make in season three.

=== 1993–96 ===
In keeping with the aesthetic overhaul AG went through at the start of its fifth season, the Eliminator too was given a makeover inspired by the British Gladiators course in use at the time. While most of the course remained the same, three new obstacles were added in season five and a fourth in season seven.

In seasons five and six, the Gladiators' involvement was limited to allowing contenders to climb back on the platform after a game judge enforced the time penalties with a stopwatch for falling off the hand bike. In season seven, the Gladiators did not participate in the game, with the game judge enforcing penalties. Gladiators did not participate in the course in both seasons of the 2008 revival.

The major changes for season five involved the start and finish of the event. The contenders began at the base of a tower, which they would scale by using a modified Versaclimber machine. Once at the top of the tower, they would use a slide to reach the handbike. The series also borrowed a cue from its British counterpart and moved the treadmill ramp to the end of the course to serve as the penultimate obstacle, with the belts slowed and two attempts to scale the treadmill allowed before a contender could walk up the side. Once at the top of the ramp, the contenders would then swing on a rope and break through a paper barrier to finish the Eliminator. As a result, the referee was positioned at the base of the top of the treadmill, with the game judge enforcing head starts and lanes.

The Eliminator course introduced in season five remained in place for the remainder of the series, except for one change made for the final season. The spinning cylinders after the handbike were done away with, replaced by two pits filled with plastic balls which the contenders had to wade through. After the second ball pit, there was a short wall to climb to reach the cargo net.

=== International tournaments ===
For both International Gladiators tournaments, which were made by London Weekend Television for ITV in the UK, and held in the National Indoor Arena in Birmingham, England where the British series taped, the Eliminator course from that series was used and consisted of these obstacles.

- Contenders started by negotiating a set of four hurdles, with two high and two low. They had to climb over the high hurdles and roll under the low ones.
- In order to get to the platform in front of the pit, a climbing rope was used.
- Both sets of contenders crossed the pit in a different manner. The men used the hand bike, while the women used a monkey bar-style apparatus called a hand ladder.
- Once across the pit the next three obstacles were the same as the American series: a run across the spinning cylinders, a climb up the cargo net, and a zipline ride to the floor.
- Once off the zipline each contender had to negotiate a balance beam.
- The treadmill followed, but keeping with British custom it was referred to as the Travelator.
- Once atop the Travelator a rope swing through a paper barrier was the finish.

=== 2008 version ===
The 2008 series used the same scoring rules that were in place from 1991 onward on the original series.

For the 2008 version, the layout was as follows.

==== Season 1 ====
- The course began with contenders climbing an 8-foot (2.4 m) wall. A rope was available for assistance.
- Once over the wall the contenders jumped into a 20-foot (6.1 m) long pool with a wall of fire on top, which they swam under.
- They would then climb a 30-foot (9.1 m) cargo net to get to the next obstacle.
- The Barrel Roll was next; the contenders had to grab and hold onto a cylinder as it rotated downward.
- The handbike followed with no specific penalty enforced for falling.
- After the handbike contenders negotiated a downhill balance beam.
- This placed the contenders at the base of the Pyramid, which they had to scale to reach the zipline.
- The last obstacle was the Travelator (adopting the treadmill's UK name). The belts were much narrower and contenders had a rope to use for assistance, but the previous series' free pass rule was not in place.

After the Travelator, a small set of stairs led to a series of crash blocks that the contenders had to break through to finish, and the first contender to do so won. If the second contender was still on the Travelator when the first contender broke through, the second contender could opt to have the Travelator turned off.

==== Season 2 ====
For season two, these changes were made:

- The wall was taken out and the swim under the wall of fire, which was now the first obstacle, doubled in length.
- The Barrel Roll was replaced by a rope swing.
- The commando lines last seen in season one returned and were referred to as the Tightrope. The major difference was that instead of a straight line walk, the ropes were slanted downward.
- Two 6-foot (1.8 m) deep ball pits were placed below the handbike, and contenders had to wade through them if they fell.
- The downhill balance beam was replaced with a spinning cylinder, which was called the "Rolling Pin".
- After the zipline, the series opted to use another balance beam, called the "Teeter Totter" after its mechanism of action, as an obstacle before the Travelator; this was another nod to the British series (which called the obstacle the "seesaw"), which adopted the mechanism toward the end of its run.
- After the stairs, the finish reverted to the one seen on the last three seasons of the original series, with a rope swing through a paper barrier into the pool. Pyrotechnics would go off for the first person to break through the barrier.

This game will return for the upcoming Prime Video revival.

== See also ==
- Lists of Gladiators events
