= Tanoai Reed =

American stunt performer

- Born: February 10, 1974 (age 52); Honolulu, Hawaiʻi, U.S.
- Occupations: Stuntman; actor
- Years active: 1995–present
- Relatives: Anoaʻi family

Tanoai Reed (born February 10, 1974) is an American stuntman and actor. He is best known for his work as the stunt double for his cousin Dwayne Johnson in multiple films.

== Early life ==
Tanoai Reed was born in Honolulu on February 10, 1974. He is primarily of Samoan descent with smaller amounts of Irish, Norwegian, and Swedish ancestry. After the separation of his parents, he grew up in California before being sent back to Hawaiʻi to live with his grandmother. He was educated at Kahuku High School and the University of Hawaiʻi.

== Career ==
Reed's stunt career began when he worked on Waterworld (1995), and he began steady work as a stunt double for his cousin Dwayne Johnson on The Scorpion King (2002). His other work includes acting in the music video for the Black Eyed Peas song "Pump It" (2005), playing one of the villains fought by Fergie. He also appears in the 2008 television series American Gladiators as the gladiator Toa. He made his voice acting debut as Royd in the 2025 video game Dispatch.

== Appearances ==
Year	Title	Role	Notes	Refs.
1995	Baywatch Nights	Stunt work	Television series	
1995	Waterworld	Stunt work		
1996	Nash Bridges	Stunt work	Television series	
1997	Buffy the Vampire Slayer	Stunt work	Television series	
1999	Angel	Stunt work	Television series	
2002	The Scorpion King	Mathayus (stunt double)		
2002	The Tuxedo	Stunt work		
2003	Charlie's Angels: Full Throttle	Wrestler		
2003	Daredevil	Stunt work		
2003	The Rundown	Stunt double for Dwayne Johnson		
2004	Max Havoc: Curse of the Dragon	Stunt work		
2004	The Stepford Wives	Tonkiro		
2004	Walking Tall	Stunt double for Dwayne Johnson		
2005	Doom	Stunt work		
2005	Be Cool	Stunt double for Dwayne Johnson		
2005	Constantine	Bouncer		
2006	Crank	Stunt work		
2006	The Fast and the Furious: Tokyo Drift	Stunt work		
2006	Gridiron Gang	Stunt double for Dwayne Johnson		
2006	Southland Tales	Stunt coordinator		
2006	You, Me and Dupree	Stunt work		
2006	The Santa Clause 3: The Escape Clause	Stunt work		
2006	Smokin' Aces	Stunt work		
2007	Epic Movie	Stunt work		
2007	Half Past Dead 2	V (stunts)		
2007	The Game Plan	Stunt work		
2007	Urban Justice	Stunt work		
2008	American Gladiators	Himself / Toa		
2008	Get Smart	Stunt double for Dwayne Johnson		
2008	Pathology	Stunt work		
2009	Lakeview Terrace			
2009	Against the Dark	Tagart		
2009	Blood and Bone	"Gold Tooth"		
2009	Dollhouse	Arcane, The Dark Figure	Season 2, Episode 10 "The Attic"	
2009	Spring Breakdown	Bouncer		
2009	Gamer			
2009	Race to Witch Mountain	Stunt double for Dwayne Johnson		
2010	Iron Man 2	Security Guard		
2010	The Other Guys	Stunt double for Dwayne Johnson		
2010	Percy Jackson & the Olympians: The Lightning Thief			
2010	Tooth Fairy	Stunt double for Dwayne Johnson		
2010	Faster	Assistant stunt coordinator		
2011	Transformers: Dark of the Moon	Stunt work		
2011	Fast Five	Stunt double for Dwayne Johnson		
2011	Priest	Brave Priest		
2012	Journey 2: The Mysterious Island	Stunt double for Dwayne Johnson		
2012	The Avengers	Stunt work		
2013	The Last Stand	Stunt work		
2013	Empire State	Stunt double for Dwayne Johnson		
2013	Star Trek Into Darkness			
2013	Fast & Furious 6	Stunt double for Dwayne Johnson		
2013	Hawaii Five-0		Season 3, Episode 19, "Levi"	
2013	Road to Paloma	"Moose"		
2013	Pain & Gain	Stunt double for Dwayne Johnson		
2013	G.I. Joe: Retaliation	Stunt double for Dwayne Johnson		
2013	Snitch	Stunt double for Dwayne Johnson		
2014	Hercules	Stunt double for Dwayne Johnson		
2015	Ballers			
2015	Furious 7	Stunt double for Dwayne Johnson		
2015	San Andreas	Stunt double for Dwayne Johnson		
2016	Central Intelligence	Stunt double for Dwayne Johnson		
2017	Baywatch	Stunt double for Dwayne Johnson		
2017	Jumanji: Welcome to the Jungle	Stunt double for Dwayne Johnson		
2017	The Fate of the Furious	Stunt double for Dwayne Johnson		
2018	Ant-Man and the Wasp			
2018	Rampage	Stunt double for Dwayne Johnson		
2018	Skyscraper	Stunt double for Dwayne Johnson		
2019	Hobbs & Shaw	Stunt double for Dwayne Johnson		
2021	Red Notice	Stunt double for Dwayne Johnson		
2021	Jungle Cruise	Stunt double for Dwayne Johnson		
2022	Black Adam	Stunt double for Dwayne Johnson		
2025	Dispatch	Royd (voice)	Video game	
