= Gladiators (2024 British TV series) series 1 =

Gladiators
- Series 1
- Starring: Bradley Walsh; Barney Walsh; Mark Clattenburg; Sonia Mkoloma; Lee Phillips; Guy Mowbray
- No. of episodes: 11

Release
- Original network: BBC One
- Original release: 13 January – 30 March 2024

Series chronology
- Next → Series 2

The first series of Gladiators aired in the UK in Spring 2024 on BBC One, and is also available on video on demand platform BBC iPlayer. The series was filmed in June 2023 at Sheffield Arena in the city of Steel.

The show is presented by Bradley Walsh and his son Barney Walsh, with ex-premier league Mark Clattenburg, Sonia Mkoloma and Lee Phillips acting as the referees. The voiceover commentary is provided by sports commentator Guy Mowbray.

The premiere episode of the rebooted Gladiators attracted a total audience of 6 million viewers, and became the biggest entertainment launch of the network in seven years. The entire 11-part series averaged with nearly 10 million total viewers on BBC One, making it confirm its second series for the following year.

== Gladiators ==
In May 2023, the following 16 elite athletes, such as professional bodybuilders or Olympic athletes were revealed as the cast of the rebooted series of Gladiators.

Males			Females		
Gladiator name	Real name	Stats	Gladiator name	Real name	Stats
Apollo	Alex Gray	6 ft 6 in, 249 lb (1.98 m, 113 kg)	Athena	Karenjeet Bains	5 ft 4 in, 148 lb (1.63 m, 67 kg)
Bionic	Matty Campbell	6 ft 6 in, 260 lb (1.98 m, 120 kg)	Comet (Note: Appeared only sparingly on the series due to major leg injury.)	Ella-Mae Rayner	5 ft 8 in, 146 lb (1.73 m, 66 kg)
Giant	Jamie Christian-Johal	6 ft 5 in, 280 lb (1.96 m, 130 kg)	Diamond	Liv Sheldon	6 ft 0 in, 176 lb (1.83 m, 80 kg)
Legend	Matt Morsia	6 ft 1 in, 212 lb (1.85 m, 96 kg)	Dynamite	Emily Steel	5 ft 5 in, 141 lb (1.65 m, 64 kg)
Nitro	Harry Aikines-Aryeetey	5 ft 11 in, 187 lb (1.80 m, 85 kg)	Electro	Jade Packer	5 ft 8 in, 154 lb (1.73 m, 70 kg)
Phantom	Toby Olubi	6 ft 5 in, 247 lb (1.96 m, 112 kg)	Fire	Montell Douglas	5 ft 10 in, 148 lb (1.78 m, 67 kg)
Steel	Zack George	6 ft 0 in, 236 lb (1.83 m, 107 kg)	Fury	Jodie Ounsley	5 ft 7 in, 163 lb (1.70 m, 74 kg)
Viper	Quang Luong	6 ft 0 in, 200 lb (1.83 m, 90 kg)	Sabre	Sheli McCoy	5 ft 7 in, 154 lb (1.70 m, 70 kg)

== Contenders ==
The colours red and blue used below denote the colours worn by the contender. The winning contenders are marked in bold. As the series consists of only five heats, and three quarter finals, in addition to the winners of the previous episodes, the fastest runner-ups advance to the next stage as wildcards (marked with WC).

Episodes	Male Contenders		Female Contenders	
Heat 1	Myles Harris	**Finley Burkitt**	**Kerry Wilson**	Tasha Lawrence (WC)
Heat 2	**Jake Spence**	John Darwen	Zoe McIntosh	**Marie-Louise Nicholson**
Heat 3	**Finlay Anderson**	Ashley Harwood (WC)	Alex McKnight	**Bronte Jones**
Heat 4	Matt Jones	**Chung Leung**	Sharan Riyat	**Nia Rutter**
Heat 5	**Dev Pankhania**	Paul Campbell	Tuathlaith Murtagh	**Betti Worth**
Quarter Final 1	Finley Burkitt/**Wesley Malé** (Note: Wesley entered the competition as a "standby contender" to replace Finley, who got injured during the heats.)	Finlay Anderson (WC)	Tasha Lawrence	**Bronte Jones**
Quarter Final 2	Jake Spence	**Chung Leung**	**Marie-Louise Nicholson**	Nia Rutter
Quarter Final 3	**Dev Pankhania**	Ashley Harwood	**Kerry Wilson**	Betti Worth (WC)
Semi Final 1	Dev Pankhania/Jake Spence (Note: Fastest runner-up of the quarter finals, Jake, replaced injured contender Dev.)	**Finlay Anderson**	Betti Worth	**Bronte Jones**
Semi Final 2	**Wesley Male**	Chung Leung/Matt Jones (Note: The fastest losing contender of the heats, Matt replaced injured contender Chung halfway through the show.)	Kerry Wilson	**Marie-Louise Nicholson**
Grand Final	Wesley Male	**Finlay Anderson**	**Marie-Louise Nicholson**	Bronte Jones
Winners	Finlay Anderson		Marie-Louise Nicholson	

== Events ==
The first rebooted series of Gladiators consisted from 8 preliminary events, from which 5 were played in each episode. The final obstacle course The Eliminator is played at the end of each episode.

The series saw the return of the following events, in order of appearance:

- Duel, in which the contender and gladiator try to knock each other down from an elevated platform using a pugil stick.
- Gauntlet, in which the contender must bypass four gladiators in a gauntlet shaped obstacle course.
- Hang Tough, in which the contender and gladiator start from opposite platforms and must use gymnastics rings to travel through the air.
- Powerball, in which the contenders must score points by getting a ball to a basket while being attacked by three gladiators.
- The Wall, which is a climbing race of a thirty feet high vertical Wall; in which the contenders must reach the top without being pulled down.

In addition, three new games appear. In order of appearance:

- Collision, in which the contenders must cross a suspension bridge, whilst four gladiators are swinging towards, trying to knock this off the bridge.
- The Ring, in which the contenders must reach a central button, whilst a gladiator tries to tackle this down.
- The Edge, which is a cat-and-mouse hunt 30 ft (9.1 m) above arena floor, where the contender must cross a grid platform as the gladiator chases this.

== Episodes ==
Note, that the episodes may not be filmed in the order of broadcast, e.g. the heat rounds may be in different order, or the second semi final was recorded before the first.

No. overall	No. in series	Title	BBC One airdate	UK viewers (millions)	Weekly Rank
1	1	"Heat 1"	13 January 2024	8.37	1st
The series begins, the first in 15 years with 2 male and 2 female contenders taking on the brand new team of Gladiators. The contenders are Finley Burkitt, a 22-year-old railway Trackman from Doncaster; Myles Harris, a 32-year-old DJ and IT engineer from Leeds; Tasha Lawrence, a 41-year-old nurse and personal trainer from Ipswich; and Kerry Wilson, a 34-year-old dogwalker from Dunfermline. Events of the first heat include the returning games Duel, Gauntlet, and Hang Tough. Two brand new games make their debut Collision and The Ring. The two winners of this heat progress straight to the quarter finals. Event 1: Duel Male contenders Finley vs. Nitro (0–0) (0–0) Myles vs. Giant Female contenders Tasha vs. Diamond (5–0) (5–0) Kerry vs. Fire Event 2: Collision Male contenders Finley vs. Legend, Steel, Giant, and Viper (DQ) (8–2) (8–2) Myles vs. Legend, Steel, Giant, and Viper During the game against Finley, Viper was disqualified for leaving his trapeze and pushing Finley off. Finley contested the next 17 seconds against the three remaining Gladiators. Female contenders Tasha vs. Fire, Athena, Electro, and Dynamite (2–4) (7–4) Kerry vs. Fire, Athena, Electro, and Dynamite Event 3: The Ring Male contenders Finley vs. Phantom (6–6) (14–8) Myles vs. Apollo The game was stopped briefly when Phantom failed to release Finley after the two second limit. Female contenders Tasha vs. Sabre (6–12) (13–16) Kerry vs. Dynamite Event 4: Gauntlet Male contenders Finley vs. Viper, Phantom, Steel, and Apollo (4–10) (18–18) Myles vs. Viper, Phantom, Steel, and Apollo After Finley had cleared half the Gauntlet, his left knee was injured when Phantom pushed him back to the start. The round had to be ended early, with Finley undergoing medical examination and receiving 4 points for the two sections he had cleared. Female contenders Tasha vs. Electro, Athena, Fury, and Diamond (10–10) (23–26) Kerry vs. Electro, Athena, Fury, and Diamond Event 5: Hang Tough Male contenders Finley vs. Legend (0–5) (18–23) Myles vs. Nitro In Myles' round, the contender reached Nitro's platform, but didn't land on it and instead started to approach the Gladiator again, although staying on the red rings and earning 5 points. Female contenders Tasha vs. Fury (0–0) (23–26) Kerry vs. Sabre Event 6: The Eliminator Male contenders: Finley / Myles; Entering the Eliminator, the score was 18–23. This 5-point lead gave Myles a 2.5-second head-start. Winner; Finley (NOTE: Due to his knee injury, Finley would later announce his withdrawal from the first quarter final for the sake of health, with substitute contender Wesley Malé taking his place for the rest of the series.) Female contenders: Tasha / Kerry; Entering the Eliminator, the score was 23–26. This 3-point lead gave Kerry a 1.5-second head-start. Winner; Kerry
2	2	"Heat 2"	20 January 2024	7.32	1st
The second of the heats, in which four new contenders take on the Gladiators. The contenders are John Darwen, a 31-year-old occupational therapy student from Preston; Jake Spence, a 23-year-old steelworker from Sheffield; Zoe McIntosh, a paramedic in the West Midlands; and Marie-Louise Nicholson, a 28-year-old fitness coach from Dublin. Events include returning contests Powerball and The Wall. The final new event is shown for the first time The Edge – in which Gladiators chase the contenders on a platform thirty feet (9 m) above the arena floor. Two Gladiators make their debut in this heat – Bionic in Duel, and Comet in The Wall. Event 1: Powerball Male contenders Jake vs. Nitro, Apollo, and Steel (2–4) (2–4) John vs. Nitro, Apollo, and Steel Female contenders Zoe vs. Fury, Sabre, and Dynamite (8–2) (8–2) Marie-Louise vs. Fury, Sabre, and Dynamite Event 2: The Edge Male contenders Jake vs. Legend (15–0) (17–4) John vs. Apollo Female contenders Zoe vs. Sabre (6–12) (14–14) Marie-Louise vs. Fury Event 3: Gauntlet Male contenders Jake vs. Viper, Phantom, Steel, and Giant (10–10) (27–14) John vs. Viper, Phantom, Steel, and Giant Female contenders Zoe vs. Athena, Fire, Electro, and Diamond (10–10) (24–24) Marie-Louise vs. Athena, Fire, Electro, and Diamond Event 4: Duel Male contenders Jake vs. Giant (0–0) (27–14) John vs. Bionic Bionic won by default after 20 seconds when John grabbed his pugil stick after being rendered unable to fight back after Bionic's first blow. Female contenders Zoe vs. Diamond (0–0) (24–24) Marie-Louise vs. Fire Zoe forfeited the event when she stepped onto Diamond's podium. Event 5: The Wall Male contenders Jake vs. Nitro (0–10) (27–24) John vs. Legend Female contenders Zoe vs. Diamond (5–10) (29–34) Marie-Louise vs. Comet Event 6: The Eliminator Male contenders: Jake / John; Entering the Eliminator, the score was 27–24. This 3-point lead gave Jake a 1.5-second head-start. Winner; Jake Female contenders: Zoe / Marie-Louise; Entering the Eliminator, the score was 29–34. This 5-point lead gave Marie-Louise a 2.5-second head-start. Winner; Marie-Louise
3	3	"Heat 3"	27 January 2024	6.63	5th
The third heat, with contenders are Bronte Jones, a 23-year-old firefighter from Sheffield; Alex McKnight, 29-year-old civil servant; Finlay Anderson, a 34-year-old army officer from Edinburgh; and Ashley Harwood, a 28-year-old salesman from London. Events Duel, Gauntlet, The Wall, The Ring and The Edge are played, in addition to The Eliminator. The two winners of this heat again progress to the quarter finals. Event 1: Duel Male contenders Finlay vs. Giant (0–10) (0–10) Ash vs. Viper Viper received a warning from the referee for a false start; Ash won the restarted event. Female contenders Alex vs. Dynamite (0–5) (0–5) Bronte vs. Diamond Event 2: The Ring Male contenders Finlay vs. Apollo (4–4) (4–14) Ash vs. Phantom Female contenders Alex vs. Sabre (4–8) (4–13) Bronte vs. Fury The game was briefy stopped when Bronte lost her helmet. Event 3: The Edge Male contenders Finlay vs. Legend (12–9) (16–23) Ash vs. Nitro Female contenders Alex vs. Diamond (9–9) (13–22) Bronte vs. Fury Event 4: Gauntlet Male contenders Finlay vs. Steel, Apollo, Nitro, and Bionic (10–6) (26–29) Ash vs. Steel, Apollo, Nitro, and Bionic During the game against Ash, Steel was disqualified for deliberately holding him. Ash restarted the game in the next zone. Female contenders Alex vs. Electro, Athena, Fire, and Dynamite (10–10) (23–32) Bronte vs. Electro, Athena, Fire, and Dynamite Event 5: The Wall Male contenders Finlay vs. Steel (10–5) (36–34) Ash vs. Legend Female contenders Alex vs. Comet (5–10) (28–42) Bronte vs. Sabre Event 6: The Eliminator Male contenders: Finlay / Ash; Entering the Eliminator, the score was 36–34. This 2-point lead gave Finlay a 1-second head-start. Winner; Finlay Female contenders: Alex / Bronte; Entering the Eliminator, the score was 28–42. This 14-point lead gave Bronte a 7-second head-start. Winner; Bronte
4	4	"Heat 4"	3 February 2024	6.82	3rd
Contenders for the fourth heat are Matt Jones, a 41-year-old civil servant from Cardiff; Chung Leung, a 33-year-old software engineer from London; Sharan Riyat, a 33-year-old dentist from Buckinghamshire; and Nia Rutter, a 37-year-old stay at home mum from Blackpool. In this heat, Gladiator Comet makes her debut in Hang Tough, which was her last appearance in this series due to injuries sustained. Other played events include Duel, Powerball and The Wall. None of the brand-new events were played in this heat. Event 1: Powerball Male contenders Matt vs. Apollo, Phantom, and Legend (2–8) (2–8) Chung vs. Apollo, Phantom, and Legend Female contenders Sharan vs. Fury, Athena, and Fire (2–2) (2–2) Nia vs. Fury, Athena, and Fire Event 2: Hang Tough Male contenders Matt vs. Legend (0–0) (2–8) Chung vs. Nitro Female contenders Sharan vs. Comet (0–0) (2–2) Nia vs. Dynamite Although not mentioned during the show, after Sharan's Hang Tough round against Comet, the Gladiator issued that upon falling awkwardly on the crash-mat, she had to retire from the series due to serious leg injury on several places. Event 3: The Wall Male contenders Matt vs. Steel (5–10) (7–18) Chung vs. Nitro Female contenders Sharan vs. Diamond (10–5) (12–7) Nia vs. Electro Sharan and Nia reached the top around the same time, with Sharan deemed to have gotten there first. Event 4: Duel Male contenders Matt vs. Giant (0–0) (7–18) Chung vs. Phantom Female contenders Sharan vs. Sabre (0–0) (12–7) Nia vs. Fury Event 5: Gauntlet Male contenders Matt vs. Bionic, Viper, Steel, and Giant (6–10) (13–28) Chung vs. Bionic, Viper, Steel, and Giant Female contenders Sharan vs. Electro, Fire, Dynamite, and Sabre (10–10) (22–17) Nia vs. Electro, Fire, Dynamite, and Sabre Event 6: The Eliminator Male contenders: Matt / Chung; Entering the Eliminator, the score was 13–28. This 15-point lead gave Chung a 7.5-second head-start. Winner; Chung Female contenders: Sharan / Nia; Entering the Eliminator, the score was 22–17. This 5-point lead gave Sharan a 2.5-second head-start. Winner; Nia
5	5	"Heat 5"	10 February 2024	5.94	9th
The last of the heats. Contenders for the fifth heat are Tuathlaith Murtagh, a 29-year old activity manager from Belfast; Betti Worth, a 31-year old gym fitness trainer from Bolton; Dev Pankhania, a 30-year old HGV mechanic from Essex;, Paul Campbell, a 57-year old salesman from Sheffield. All of the brand-new events, Collision, The Edge and The Ring are played, amongst classical ones. Event 1: The Ring Male contenders Dev vs. Nitro (0–2) (0–2) Paul vs. Phantom Female contenders Tuathlaith vs. Diamond (6–8) (6–8) Betti vs. Fury Event 2: Collision Male contenders Dev vs. Legend, Apollo, Viper and Giant (2–2) (2–4) Paul vs. Legend, Apollo, Viper and Giant During the game against Dev, Legend knocked the contender off the bridge by getting him in a scissor hold. As this was an illegal move, Dev replayed the event but was then knocked of by Viper; Viper was deemed to have legally knocked Dev off, therefore ending the event. Female contenders Tuathlaith vs. Electro, Athena, Dynamite and Fire (6–4) (12–12) Betti vs. Electro, Athena, Dynamite and Fire Event 3: The Wall Male contenders Dev vs. Viper (10–0) (12–4) Paul vs. Nitro Female contenders Tuathlaith vs. Sabre (10–0) (22–12) Betti vs. Diamond Event 4: The Edge Male contenders Dev vs. Steel (6–6) (18–10) Paul vs. Legend Female contenders Tuathlaith vs. Fury (15–3) (37–15) Betti vs. Sabre Betti suffered an unspecified injury after landing in the net awkwardly from being tackled off the Edge by Sabre. Event 5: Duel Male contenders Dev vs. Phantom (0–0) (18–10) Paul vs. Steel Paul forfeited the event when he put his hands down onto Steel's podium Female contenders Tuathlaith vs. Athena (10–5) (47–20) Betti vs. Fire Event 6: The Eliminator Male contenders: Dev / Paul; Entering the Eliminator, the score was 18–10. This 8-point lead gave Dev a 4-second head-start. Winner; Dev (NOTE: On his return to the third quarter-final, Dev was shown to have suffered a shoulder injury; this would be pointed out in the Eliminator then. Female contenders: Tuathlaith / Betti; Entering the eliminator, the score was 47–20. This 27-point lead gave Tuathlaith a 13.5-second head start. Winner; Betti
6	6	"Quarter Final 1"	17 February 2024	6.05	7th
The quarter finals begin. Contenders for this episode are Finley and Tasha from Heat 1, the latter qualifying as the fastest female runner-up from the heats; and Finlay and Bronte from Heat 3. However, as contender Finley was injured during the heat, a standby contender, Wesley, took his place for the quarter-final and competed for the place in the semi-finals. The first of the quarters consists from events Duel, The Wall, The Ring, The Edge and Gauntlet. Event 1: Duel Male contenders Wesley vs. Phantom (0–5) (0–5) Finlay vs. Bionic Female contenders Tasha vs. Dynamite (0–0) (0–0) Bronte vs. Fury Tasha forfeited the event after putting her hands down onto Dynamite's podium. Event 2: The Wall Male contenders Wesley vs. Viper (10–0) (10–5) Finlay vs. Nitro Female contenders Tasha vs. Electro (0–10) (0–10) Bronte vs. Dynamite Event 3: The Ring Male contenders Wesley vs. Steel (4–6) (14–11) Finlay vs. Apollo Female contenders Tasha vs. Electro (8–10) (8–20) Bronte vs. Fury Event 4: The Edge Male contenders Wesley vs. Apollo (18–9) (32–20) Finlay vs. Legend Finlay was later found to have sustained a rib injury after Legend took him off the Edge. Consequentially, he would forfeit running the Gauntlet for this reason. Female contenders Tasha vs. Diamond (18–3) (26–23) Bronte vs. Sabre Event 5: Gauntlet Male contenders Wesley vs. Nitro, Viper, Phantom and Giant (10-Forfeit) (42–20) No Contest vs. None (No Contest) Female contenders Tasha vs. Sabre, Athena, Fire, Diamond (10–10) (36–33) Bronte vs. Sabre, Athena, Fire and Diamond Bronte's round was stopped twice, as Gladiators Sabre and Fire discarded their pads and stopped Bronte barehanded. They were each disqualified for doing this with Bronte continuing the game from the next sector each time. Diamond was likewise warned by Clattenberg after dropping her rod at the end of Bronte's run. Event 6: The Eliminator Male contenders: Wesley / Finlay; Entering the Eliminator, the score was 42–20. This 22-point lead gave Wesley an 11-second head-start. Winner; Wesley Female contenders: Tasha / Bronte; Entering the eliminator, the score was 36–33. This 3-point lead gave Tasha a 1.5-second head start. Winner; Bronte
7	7	"Quarter Final 2"	24 February 2024	5.65	6th
The second of the quarter finals. Contenders are Jake and Marie-Louise, the winners of Heat 2, and Chung and Nia, from Heat 4 respectively. The second of the quarters consists the events Powerball, The Wall, The Edge, Gauntlet and Duel. The two winners of this quarters progress to the semi-finals. Event 1: Powerball Male contenders Jake vs. Giant, Apollo, and Steel (4–0) (4–0) Chung vs. Giant, Apollo, and Steel Female contenders Marie-Louise vs. Fury, Fire, and Electro (2–4) (2–4) Nia vs. Fury, Fire, and Electro The game was briefly stopped when Nia suffered a glute injury after landing on her right hip from being tackled by Fury. Event 2: The Wall Male contenders Jake vs. Apollo (0–10) (4–10) Chung vs. Nitro Female contenders Marie-Louise vs. Sabre (10–0) (12–4) Nia vs. Dynamite Event 3: The Edge Male contenders Jake vs. Steel (0–18) (4–28) Chung vs. Legend The event was restarted when Legend was doing push-ups at the first few seconds of the game instead of chasing Chung. Female contenders Marie-Louise vs. Fury (0–6) (12–10) Nia vs. Sabre Event 4: Gauntlet Male contenders Jake vs. Viper, Legend, Phantom, and Giant (10–10) (14–38) Chung vs. Viper, Legend, Phantom, and Giant Legend was reprimanded when he continued to fight Jake after the latter got past his zone. He got reprimanded again after ringing out Chung over the rim of the Gauntlet. Both contenders' runs were restarted from the subsequent zone. Female contenders Marie-Louise vs. Dynamite, Athena, Electro, and Diamond (10–10) (22–20) Nia vs. Dynamite, Athena, Electro, and Diamond Event 5: Duel Male contenders Jake vs. Nitro (0–0) (14–38) Chung vs. Bionic Jake forfeited the event after he fell onto Nitro's podium. Female contenders Marie-Louise vs. Diamond (0–5) (22–25) Nia vs. Fire Event 6: The Eliminator Male contenders: Jake / Chung; Entering the Eliminator, the score was 14–38. This 24-point lead gave Chung a 12-second head-start. Winner; Chung Female contenders: Marie-Louise / Nia; Entering the eliminator, the score was 22–25. This 3-point lead gave Nia a 1.5-second head start. Winner; Marie-Louise
8	8	"Quarter Final 3"	2 March 2024	5.41	5th
The last of the quarter finals. The contenders are: Dev and Betti from Heat 5, Ash from Heat 3, who qualified as the fastest male runner-up and Kerry from Heat 1. The events played include The Ring, Collision, and Hang Tough for the last time in this series. Event 1: Collision Male contenders Dev vs. Legend, Giant, Phantom and Bionic (4–0) (4–0) Ash vs. Legend, Giant, Phantom and Bionic Female contenders Kerry vs. Athena, Electro, Dynamite and Diamond (0–8) (0–8) Betti vs. Athena, Electro, Dynamite and Diamond Event 2: The Ring Male contenders Dev vs. Steel (4–10) (8–10) Ash vs. Viper The event was briefly stopped when Viper held onto Ash for longer than 2 seconds. He was warned for this action. Female contenders Kerry vs. Fire (8–8) (8–16) Betti vs. Fury Event 3: Duel Male contenders Dev vs. Nitro (0–0) (8–10) Ash vs. Giant Female contenders Kerry vs. Dynamite (5–0) (13–16) Betti vs. Sabre Though Betti survived the Duel, she did so entirely defensively using her pugil stick for balance, so Sabre won by default. Event 4: The Wall Male contenders Dev vs. Steel (10–0) (18–10) Ash vs. Apollo Female contenders Kerry vs. Electro (10–0) (23–16) Betti vs. Diamond Event 5: Hang Tough Male contenders Dev vs. Legend (0–0) (18–10) Ash vs. Nitro Female contenders Kerry vs. Sabre (5–0) (28–16) Betti vs. Dynamite Event 6: The Eliminator Male contenders: Dev / Ash; Entering the Eliminator, the score was 18–10. This 8-point lead gave Dev a 4-second head-start. Winner; Dev (NOTE: due to his shoulder injury reoccurring in the Eliminator, Dev would announce his withdrawal from the first semi-final, with Jake, who completed it quicker than Ash did, being reinstated in his place) Female contenders: Kerry / Betti; Entering the eliminator, the score was 28–16. This 12-point lead gave Kerry a 6-second head start. Winner; Kerry
9	9	"Semi Final 1"	9 March 2024	4.67	6th
The first of the semi finals. Quarter-final winners Dev and Bronte, as well as the fastest runners-up Finlay and Betti, competed for the place in the finals. However, Dev had to withdraw from the competition due to injury and was replaced by Jake, the next fastest male runner-up. Powerball, Duel, Gauntlet, The Wall and The Edge are played in this episode. Gladiator Sabre injured herself on The Edge and had to retire from this series, although appeared in Semi Final 2 as her game had been recorded prior to the injury. Event 1: Powerball Male contenders Jake vs. Giant, Viper, and Nitro (4–6) (4–4) Finlay vs. Giant, Viper, and Nitro Female contenders Betti vs. Fire, Electro and Fury (8–6) (6–6) Bronte vs. Fire, Electro and Fury The scores above reflect the scoreboard during the event and the total scoreboard; both Betti's first ball during the women's game and Finlay's second ball during the men's game were deemed invalid, as Betti had been fully tackled by Electro before she scored, and Finlay's attempt at a long pot bounced before entering the basket. Event 2: Duel Male contenders Jake vs. Bionic (0–0) (4–4) Finlay vs. Phantom Finlay forfeited the event when he stepped onto Phantom's podium. Female contenders Betti vs. Sabre (5–5) (11–11) Bronte vs. Diamond Event 3: Gauntlet Male contenders Jake vs. Steel, Legend, Apollo and Giant (10–10) (14–14) Finlay vs. Steel, Legend, Apollo and Giant Female contenders Betti vs. Electro, Athena, Fire and Diamond (10–10) (21–21) Bronte vs. Electro, Athena, Fire and Diamond Event 4: The Wall Male contenders Jake vs. Apollo (10–0) (24–14) Finlay vs. Nitro Female contenders Betti vs. Dynamite (0–10) (21–31) Bronte vs. Sabre Event 5: The Edge Male contenders Jake vs. Legend (6–4) (30–18) Finlay vs. Apollo In Finlay's run, the game was briefly stopped after he lost a shoe. Female contenders Betti vs. Fury (4–2 (10)) (25–41) Bronte vs. Sabre In Bronte's run, the game was stopped after 30 seconds when Sabre injured herself when trying to push her off, therefore Bronte automatically claimed maximum points. Event 6: The Eliminator Male contenders: Jake / Finlay; Entering the Eliminator, the score was 30–18. This 12-point lead gave Jake a 6-second head-start. Winner; Finlay Female contenders: Betti / Bronte; Entering the eliminator, the score was 25–41. This 16-point lead gave Bronte an 8-second head start. Winner; Bronte
10	10	"Semi Final 2"	23 March 2024	5.41	4th
In the last semi final, battling for the final places for the Grand Final are male contenders Wesley and Chung, and female contenders Kerry and Marie-Louise. During the fourth event, Powerball, Chung injured himself and had to withdraw from the competition. He was replaced by Matt, the competitor who lost to him in the heats, for the remainder of the competition. The episode also sees Sabre's last appearance during the series, and Dynamite appearing in 4 different events, which is more than any other Gladiator has participated in a single episode. Event 1: Duel Male contenders Wesley vs. Giant (0–0) (0–0) Chung vs. Bionic Female contenders Kerry vs. Fire (5–0) (5–0) Marie-Louise vs. Dynamite Event 2: The Wall Male contenders Wesley vs. Steel (0–10) (0–10) Chung vs. Nitro Female contenders Kerry vs. Diamond (10–5) (15–5) Marie-Louise vs. Dynamite Event 3: The Edge Male contenders Wesley vs. Legend (8–2) (8–12) Chung vs. Apollo Female contenders Kerry vs. Sabre (10–2) (25–7) Marie-Louise vs. Diamond Contender Kerry faced Sabre in this event, although the Gladiator can be seen injuring herself during the previous episode; this semi final was recorded before the previous semi final. Sabre was pushed off the Edge by Kerry, allowing Kerry to complete the event unopposed. Event 4: Powerball Male contenders Wesley vs. Phantom, Steel and Apollo (4–0) (12–12) Chung/Matt vs. Phantom, Steel and Apollo The men's game was suspended after 15 seconds when a tackle by Apollo resulted in Chung injuring his left knee. After the women's game was played to allow time for a medical examination, it was deemed that Chung could no longer compete, with his heat runner-up, Matt, being reinstated for the remainder of the semi-final from the restarted men's game. Female contenders Kerry vs. Fury, Athena and Dynamite (4–4) (29–11) Marie-Louise vs. Fury, Athena and Dynamite Event 5: Gauntlet Male contenders Wesley vs. Viper, Nitro, Phantom, and Giant (10–10) (22–22) Matt vs. Viper, Nitro, Phantom, and Giant In Matt's run, Matt was forced to re-run the last section of the Gauntlet after he was illogically deemed to have "deliberately" left the Gauntlet when he was actually ringed out over the edge by Giant. Female contenders Kerry vs. Electro, Athena, Dynamite, and Diamond (10–10) (39–21) Marie-Louise vs. Electro, Athena, Dynamite, and Diamond Event 6: The Eliminator Male contenders: Wesley / Matt; Both contenders' scores were tied going into the Eliminator, meaning neither got a time advantage. Winner; Wesley Female contenders: Kerry / Marie-Louise; Entering the eliminator, the score was 39–21. This 18-point lead gave Kerry a 9-second head start. Winner; Marie-Louise
11	11	"The Final"	30 March 2024	5.54	4th
The Series Champions are crowned here. The male finalists are Wesley Male and Finlay Anderson, and female finalists are Marie-Louise Nicholson and Bronte Jones. This episode will also feature a rematch against Finlay and Wesley after the latter beat the former on the Eliminator. Events of the final are Gauntlet, Duel, The Edge, The Wall and Collision. Former Gladiators legend Saracen, Mike Lewis, appeared on the audience for the finale. At the end of the show, it was announced that the casting for the contenders of series 2 was open. Event 1: Gauntlet Male contenders Finlay vs. Nitro, Steel, Phantom, and Apollo (10–10) (10–10) Wesley vs. Nitro, Steel, Phantom, Apollo Female contenders Bronte vs. Electro, Athena, Fire, Diamond (10–10) (10–10) Marie-Louise vs. Electro, Athena, Fire, and Diamond Marie-Louise's run was briefly stopped when Diamond deliberately pinned her as time ran out; the event was restarted in the fourth zone with the 6 seconds that remained from when Marie-Louise first entered. Event 2: Duel Male contenders Finlay vs. Giant (0–0) (10–10) Wesley vs. Bionic After his match against Finlay, Giant announced that Saracen was in the audience. Female contenders Bronte vs. Fire (0–0) (10–10) Marie-Louise vs. Dynamite The event was briefly stopped when during her match against Bronte, Fire continued to jab against the contender after being warned against doing so during the match. Bronte subsequently forfeited the event when she fell onto Fire's platform. Event 3: The Edge Male contenders Finlay vs. Legend (4–2) (14–12) Wesley vs. Apollo Female contenders Bronte vs. Fury (0–8) (10–18) Marie-Louise vs. Diamond Event 4: The Wall Male contenders Finlay vs. Steel (0–0) (14–12) Wesley vs. Nitro Female contenders Bronte vs. Dynamite (0–0) (10–18) Marie-Louise vs. Diamond Event 5: Collision Male contenders Finlay vs. Viper, Giant, Bionic, and Legend (0–2) (14–14) Wesley vs. Viper, Giant, Bionic, and Legend Viper's only event in the finals. After the mens event ended, Legend and the rest of the gladiators had to calm down Viper after going nosey with Bradley. Female contenders Bronte vs. Athena, Electro, Dynamite, and Fury (6–2) (16–20) Marie-Louise vs. Athena, Electro, Dynamite, and Fury Bronte's fourth ball, which would've scored her 8 points, was deemed invalid as it had entered the basket just after time was up. She was also constantly reminded by the referee to keep moving, as the rule of the game suggests. Event 6: The Eliminator Male contenders: Wesley / Finlay; Just as in the second Semi-Final, both contenders' scores were tied going into the Eliminator, meaning neither got a time advantage. Winner; Finlay (Finlay crowned as the series male champion) Female contenders: Marie-Louise / Bronte; Entering the Eliminator, the score was 16–20. This 4-point lead gave Marie-Louise a 2-second head-start. Winner; Marie-Louise (Marie-Louise crowned as the series female champion)

=== Contenders progress ===
Color key:

Series champions
Series runners-up
The contender won the episode and advanced
The contender won the episode as a substitute for an injured contender
The contender was medically withdrawn from the competition
The contender lost the episode but was the fastest finisher out of the other eliminated contenders and thus qualified
The contender lost the episode and was eliminated

Contenders	Episodes										
Contenders	Heats					Quarter Finals			Semi Finals		Final
Contenders	1	2	3	4	5	6	7	8	9	10	11
Marie-Louise	—N/a	WIN	—N/a				WIN	—N/a		WIN	CHAMPION
Finlay	—N/a		WIN	—N/a		FF	—N/a		WIN	—N/a	CHAMPION
Bronte	—N/a		WIN	—N/a		WIN	—N/a		WIN	—N/a	RUNNER-UP
Wesley	—N/a					WIN (Note: See Contender notes above)	—N/a			WIN	RUNNER-UP
Matt	—N/a			OUT	—N/a					OUT	—N/a
Kerry	WIN	—N/a						WIN	—N/a	OUT	—N/a
Chung	—N/a			WIN	—N/a		WIN	—N/a		WDR	—N/a
Jake	—N/a	WIN	—N/a				OUT	—N/a	OUT	—N/a	
Betti	—N/a				WIN	—N/a		FF	OUT	—N/a	
Dev	—N/a				WIN	—N/a		WIN	WDR	—N/a	
Ash	—N/a		FF	—N/a				OUT	—N/a		
Nia	—N/a			WIN	—N/a		OUT	—N/a			
Tasha	FF	—N/a				OUT	—N/a				
Finley	WIN	—N/a				WDR	—N/a				
Paul	—N/a				OUT	—N/a					
Tuathlaith	—N/a				OUT	—N/a					
Sharan	—N/a			OUT	—N/a						
Alex	—N/a		OUT	—N/a							
John	—N/a	OUT	—N/a								
Zoe	—N/a	OUT	—N/a								
Myles	OUT	—N/a									

== Gladiator injuries ==
Two of the female Gladiators were injured during the filming of the series. Comet (Ella-Mae Rayner) sustained several bone fractures in her legs in several places – including the talus – as well as sustaining a Lisfranc injury, three ruptured ligaments, and a dislocated bone, when competing in her speciality event Hang Tough in aired Heat 4. Sabre (Sheli McCoy) also injured her hamstring as a result of her attempt to push contender Bronte off The Edge in Semi-Final 1. Owing to these incidents both of the Gladiators had to go on hiatus for the remainder of the series. Male Gladiator Bionic (Matty Campbell) also made fewer appearances during the season due to minor shoulder- and leg injury.

== Controversy ==
In January 2024, upon the series premiere, the BBC discovered past use of anabolic steroids by Gladiator Giant (Jamie Christian-Johal) from a 2022 YouTube video, which the video has since been deleted. The Gladiator himself stated that he has not been in contact with any kind of "performance enhancing drug" since his professional career ended. The BBC also stated that upon the casting for the Gladiators and contenders, they had to complete multiple tests in case of any prohibited steroid-use; the tests were negative for all of the Gladiators. Consequently, it was reported that Giant would still return for the second series of the show.
