= Sheli McCoy =

British weightlifter (born 1988)

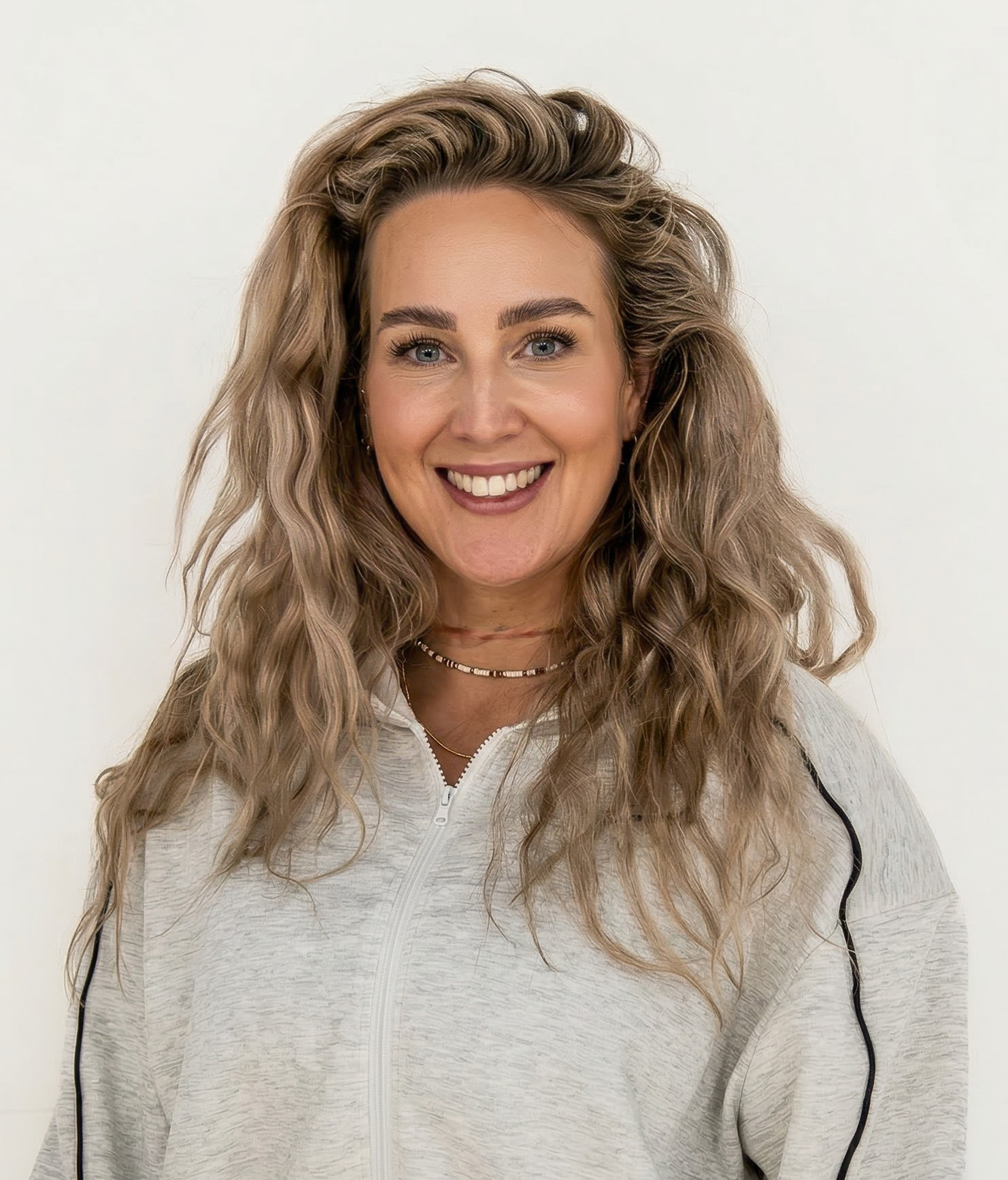
- Sheli McCoy in 2026.

Personal information
- Nicknames: Coach Sheli; Sabre
- Nationality: Scottish
- Born: Sheli Jane McCoy; 10 July 1988 (age 38) Windsor, Berkshire, England
- Home town: Menzieshill, Dundee, Scotland
- Education: Robert Gordon University
- Occupations: Weightlifter; personal trainer; fitness influencer; television personality
- Height: 5 ft 7 in (170 cm)
- Weight: 70 kg (154 lb)

Sport
- Country: (United Kingdom) Great Britain
- Sport: Weightlifting

Achievements and titles
- Personal bests: Back squat 140 kg (310 lb); Clean and jerk 100 kg (220 lb); Deadlift 160 kg (350 lb)

Sheli Jane McCoy (born 10 July 1988) is a Scottish CrossFit athlete, weightlifter and television personality, who set three Scottish weightlifting records in 2023. She appears as Sabre on the British TV endurance sports game show Gladiators.

== Early life ==
Sheli Jane McCoy was born on 10 July 1988 in Windsor, Berkshire, attended Bell Baxter High School, and graduated with a master's degree from Robert Gordon University in Aberdeen, before moving and living in the Menzieshill area of Dundee, Scotland.

== Career ==
McCoy has competed in five British Weightlifting Championships events and CrossFit championships, and became Scottish champion in both sports. She set three new Scottish records in Olympic weightlifting at the Scottish Championships in 2023, and ranked 104th out of over 23,000 participants in the 2023 CrossFit championships.

In 2024, she first appeared as "Sabre" on the BBC One television endurance sports game show Gladiators. Although she suffered an injury during the semi-final stages of the competition, she was described as a “standout" and a "breakout star" from the television show. Initially, she wanted to be called Alpha, the name of her pet husky. The hit-success of the series has been credited in part to the popularity of new Gladiators like Sabre, Diamond and Fury.

She was a guest speaker for Dundee University in February 2024 giving their Annual Public Lecture in Entrepreneurship. She was a guest on the BBC Sounds podcast For Fitness Sake in March 2024. That month, she also appeared on the BBC One charity fundraising show Comic Relief. In 2024, McCoy appeared on television quiz shows The Weakest Link as a contestant, alongside fellow Gladiators Giant, Bionic, Athena and Fire, and on The Wheel as one of the celebrity experts. In November 2025, McCoy won the Scottish Bafta Audience Award for Favourite Scot on Screen at the 2025 British Academy Scotland Awards for her work as Sabre.

== Personal life ==
Standing roughly 5 ft 7 in tall, McCoy trains up to 16–19 hours per week to maintain her physique. Her training programme relies on strength, power, agility, and flexibility and mobility, for gymnastics. Outside weight training and coaching, she enjoys golfing.

Her parents were both army sergeants. Her mother, Kaz, was in the Royal Signals and her father, Sean, was in the Scots Guards. She has a brother. Her father died in a car accident when she was three years old. She is the co-owner of a gym in Dundee alongside former professional ice hockey player Sam McCluskey. She is also a qualified sports rehabilitation therapist. She is teetotal.

She has been open about being a victim of domestic abuse during a previous relationship, which inspired her to become a fitness champion.

== Filmography ==
Year	Title	Role	Ref.
2024–present	Gladiators	Sabre	
2024	Comic Relief	Sabre	
2024	The Weakest Link	Sabre	
2024	Michael McIntyre's The Wheel	Sabre	

== Awards and nominations ==
- BAFTA Scotland 2025 Audience Award — Favourite Scot On Screen
