= Christopher Whitehead Language College =

Location
- Bromwich Road; Worcester, Worcestershire, WR2 4AF; England; 52°11′10″N 2°13′59″W

Information
- Type: Academy
- Motto: In pursuit of Excellence
- Established: 1983
- Founder: Christopher Whitehead
- Local authority: Worcestershire
- Specialist: Language College
- Department for Education URN: 136890 Tables
- Ofsted: Reports
- Chair: Kathryn Bentley
- Headteacher: Catherine Clark
- Gender: Mixed
- Age: 11 to 18
- Enrolment: approx 1640
- Houses: Brunel, Da Vinci, Shakespeare, Curie, Pankhurst, Seacole
- Colours: Yellow, Red, Green, Cyan, Blue and Purple

Christopher Whitehead Language College and Sixth Form is a secondary school in Worcester, Worcestershire, England. It is a co-educational school, in which there are about 1500 students enrolled, aged between 11 and 19. The school holds Specialist Language College status, and became an academy in 2011. In 2015 they opened a new sixth form centre with the first intake arriving in September 2015.

== History ==
The school was opened in 1983 following the merger of two schools and it draws its pupils mainly from the St John's area of Worcester and the surrounding west side of Worcester City. The school gained specialist language college status in September 2005.

Geography teacher Christopher Elliott was found guilty on 3 June 2011 of "unprofessional conduct" at Christopher Whitehead Language College in Worcester where he worked for nine years for "mocking disabled children and throwing chairs at students". On one occasion, it is said he "mocked one child who suffered from a condition that left him shorter than his fellow pupils" by kneeling on the floor next to the student and saying: "'Is this what it is like being you?'".

== Grounds and Facilities ==
The school occupies a large site on the west bank of the River Severn with views of the Malvern Hills and of Worcester City and its cathedral. The school was formed in 1983 by the amalgamation of two schools, Christopher Whitehead Boys School and Christopher Whitehead Girls School. The Boys School was formerly housed in the older 1950s buildings and the Girls Schools in the newer 1960s and 1970s buildings. As such, its buildings vary in age and architecture. The 1950s School building originally housed both the Boys and Girls school, separate entrances were used. It has been substantially modernised and re-equipped since its formation.

An extension opened in 2017, with 29 new classrooms built, as a result of a government funded build. This allowed for an increase in the intake number of year 7 students in addition to the 220 Sixth Form students.

== Houses ==
In September 2007, the school was divided into six houses. Each pupil wears a coloured tie or pin badge of their corresponding house. Students now share their forms with approximately five pupils from each year at the school in the same house. The houses are: Brunel, Da Vinci, Shakespeare, Curie, Pankhurst and Seacole.

== Notable former students ==
- Livi Sheldon, TV personality Gladiators (2024)

Dave Mason, Singer and Songwriter (1946-2026)
