= Clubcall =

Clubcall can mean:

- ClubCall, a British football information website and previously phone line
- Club Call, an opportunity for teams in the Super League play-offs after winning a match in the first week to select their opponents in the third week
