= Myton School =

Location
- Myton Road; Warwick, Warwickshire, CV34 6PJ; England; 52°16′48″N 1°33′55″W

Information
- Type: Academy
- Established: 1968
- Local authority: Warwickshire County Council
- Department for Education URN: 136907 Tables
- Ofsted: Reports
- Headteacher: Andy Perry
- Gender: Coeducational
- Age: 11 to 18
- Enrolment: 1,659
- Houses: 🟩Beauchamp, 🟥Leycester, 🟨Greville, 🟦Montgomery, 🟪Oken
- Website: http://www.mytonschool.co.uk/

Myton School is a coeducational secondary school and sixth form. Most students live locally, although the school attracts students from outside the priority area. The school is located on Myton Road in the town of Warwick in Warwickshire, England. The history of the school in its current form dates from 1968. As of January 2015 the school has around 1,700 students.

== History ==
The school started life as Oken School, a mixed-sex, non-selective secondary school which was opened in 1954. In 1959 Oken became Oken High School for Boys when the girls were transferred to the newly established Beauchamp High School for Girls. The two single-sex schools had each moved to the site that Myton School presently occupies and they were amalgamated in 1968. Since then the school has grown substantially as the size of each school year has increased, 11-year-olds were admitted for the first time in 1996 (when Warwickshire changed its secondary school start date to a year earlier) and as the Sixth Form has grown in size.

The school became a grant maintained school in 1992, and a foundation school after grant maintained status was abolished by the incoming Labour government in 1997. Under the government's school specialisation funding scheme it has become a specialist Science College. On 1 July 2011, the school became an academy.

The school was one of two in Warwick embroiled in the reinforced autoclaved aerated concrete (RAAC) scandal of 2023. In early September of that year, just before the start of the academic year, it was disclosed that up to 28 teaching spaces in the school could be unusable due to safety concerns based on the use of RAAC in the construction of those parts of the school. This delayed the return of pupils to the school for the start of the autumn term of the 2023-2024 school year.

== Traditions ==
Each student in year 7 to 11 belongs to one of the Houses (Beauchamp, Leycester, Greville, Montgomery and Oken) and participates in events to earn points for their particular House.

Colours are awarded in subjects such as Science, Art, Eco-Club, Music, Drama and various sports in recognition of attendance, effort, commitment and achievement over the year.

== Mural ==
Myton School caused controversy in November 2015 with its decision to board up one of the most important murals of the artist Alan Sorrell, which he painted in the entrance hall before the school opened. The School justified this act in a newsletter under the heading "Sorrell mural protected for future generations", saying "In the instance of our lower school reception, which acts as the main student entrance to the school, we felt that the whole area needed to be adapted to create a bright, engaging and stimulating entrance for our students." The 16-metre long mural has been covered by plastic boards with slogans such as Enthusiasm and zest, Self Control and Curiosity. The mural was listed Grade II by Historic England in 2016.

== Notable former pupils ==
- Neil Adams - judo champion
- Karenjeet Kaur Bains - powerlifter and gladiator
- Jess Carter - Footballer for Chelsea F.C. Women and England women's national football team
- Lucy Collett - British glamour model
- Josh Dacres-Cogley - Bolton Wanderers footballer
