= Gideon Coe =

British radio presenter

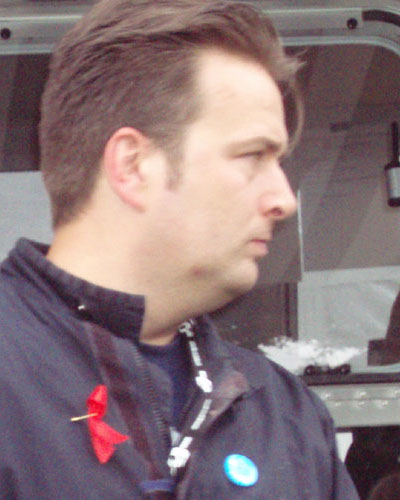
- Coe in 2005
- Born: Gideon Jon Quantrill Coe; 22 September 1967 (age 58); Canterbury, Kent, England
- Other name: The Guv'nor
- Education: Lanchester Polytechnic
- Occupation: radio presenter
- Years active: 1976–present
- Known for: DJ presenter of BBC Radio 6 Music
- Parent: Tony Coe

Gideon Jon Quantrill Coe (born 22 September 1967) is a radio DJ, presenter, sportscaster, voiceover artist and journalist.

== Early career ==
He began his broadcasting career in 1976 as a child presenter on the BBC One TV programme Why Don't You?.

Coe graduated from Coventry's Lanchester Polytechnic (now Coventry University) in 1989, gaining a 2.1 in Communication Studies. During his time there he played rhythm guitar with pop/punk band Cradle Song (AKA The Vendetta Men), having previously played in The Strike It Out Gang (featuring Martin-Kid - Curtis, Michael Clarke, Big Chris Bryan and his brother Simon Coe) and A-Bomb, the latter featuring guitarist Mick Corney and drummer Dom Clark. He began working in local government for Kent County Council, before starting as a sports broadcaster at BT ClubCall.

== Radio work ==
Coe joined BBC GLR in 1994 as Breakfast show sports reporter, moving up to joint-presentation duties with Fi Glover. He won Sony Awards in 1995 and 1999 for the Sports show. He has presented shows on BBC Radio 5 Live and BBC Radio 4, where he became a regular guest on Loose Ends. He has also appeared in TV programmes and was presenter of Something for the Weekend on VH1 and The Live Six Show on Sky One. He also does voiceovers for Channel Five as well as contributing to The Guardian.

He joined BBC Radio 6 Music in 2002, presenting the 10 am – 1 pm weekday show from the station's launch until October 2007. He won his third Sony Award in 2003 for his work presenting the mid-morning show. On 22 October 2007 Coe's show was moved to 10 pm – 1 am, Mondays to Thursdays. This was followed by a move to 9 pm – midnight on Mondays to Thursdays in June 2008 - a slot he maintained for more than 13 years. Since 2023 he has co-presented the show 9-11pm with Marc Riley, currently co-hosting for two weeks, taking a week off, then hosting solo. While the mid-morning show featured live sessions in the 6 Music Hub, the late show with Riley mixes archived BBC Radio sessions with new ones from emerging and established talent.

On 11 February 2024, Coe, sitting in for Cerys Matthews, hosted the last 6 Music programme from Wogan House after 18 years. The station has now moved back in to Broadcasting House.

== Personal life ==
Coe is the son of jazz musician Tony Coe. He has three brothers, is married and has a son named Nathaniel. A pescatarian, he is a fan of Tottenham Hotspur and of The Clash.
