= Amar Stewart =

British painter

Amar Stewart is a Brooklyn-based artist who often depicts modern celebrities in the guise of Renaissance-style oil paintings. He moved to the United States from London in early 2014. He brought with him paintings of Biggie and Tupac inspired by the Dutch painter Frans Hals. He was Cotton Candy Machine's first resident artist in early 2014, completing 13 works in just one month. The collected series is titled "Hip-Hop Royalty." His work was shown at a solo show in San Francisco, at the Public Barber Gallery in August 2014. In January 2019 several of Stewart's paintings were displayed in the newly opened Williamsburg bar "KillBar" whose theme was an homage to Quentin Tarantino. Bar owner Michael Galkovich commissioned Stewart to curate and create the main pieces of art at the bar. One painting depicts The Bride from the Tarantino film Kill Bill.

He was the featured artist in an episode of the second series of the BBC TV series Extraordinary Portraits, where he painted a portrait of powerlifter Karenjeet Kaur Bains.

As an artist, he is self-taught.
