= Guy Mowbray =

English football commentator

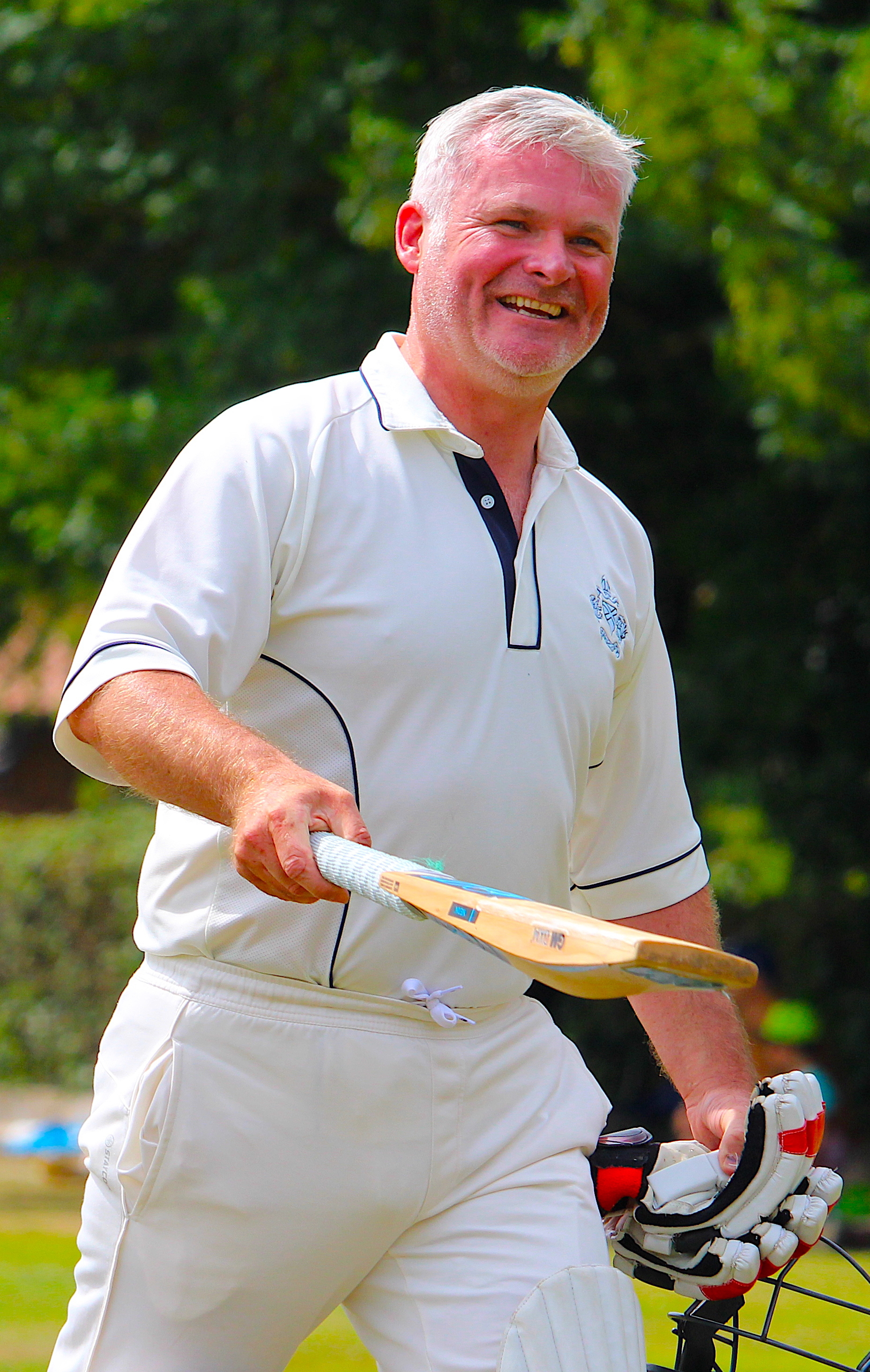
- Mowbray in 2022
- Born: Guy Nicholas Mowbray; 16 February 1972 (age 54); York, England
- Occupation: Football commentator
- Employer(s): BBC Sport; IMG; TNT Sports EA Sports

Guy Nicholas Mowbray (born 16 February 1972) is an English football commentator, who primarily appears on the BBC and TNT Sports. While working for Eurosport at the 1998 World Cup, he became the youngest ever television commentator on a World Cup final, aged 26.

== Early life ==
Guy Nicholas Mowbray was born on 16 February 1972 in York, Yorkshire. His career began in the mid-1990s through the ClubCall network, a series of premium rate phone lines containing club information and commentaries. He joined BBC Radio York where he covered rugby league, cricket and football. He then moved to commercial station Sun FM in Sunderland and then to Metro Radio in Newcastle.

Whilst at Metro Radio he started commentating on Sunderland's matches alongside summariser Eric Gates. During this time he became sports editor and won Sony and EMAP Radio Awards.

== Broadcasting career ==
=== Eurosport (1997–1999) ===
In April 1997 Mowbray made his television debut with Eurosport. In little over a year he became their primary commentator 1998 World Cup in France. At 26 he became the youngest broadcaster to commentate on the World Cup final for television. He also picked up the Newcomer of the Year award from the Royal Television Society.

=== ITV (1999–2004) ===
Mowbray departed Eurosport and Metro Radio in 1999 to join ITV. In five years with the network he covered live Champions League, Football League and Italian matches. He was a leading member of the commentary team on the ill-fated ITV Sport Channel. He also contributed commentaries at Euro 2000 and Euro 2004 as well as the 2002 World Cup. ITV also held the rights to Premiership highlights for three seasons and Mowbray was a regular commentator alongside Clive Tyldesley, Peter Drury and Jon Champion on the Saturday night highlights show.

=== BBC (2004–present) ===
However, with the loss of Premiership highlights to the BBC in 2004, Mowbray found his prospects at ITV limited and turned freelance, gaining regular work with the corporation on Match of the Day. Due to a change in format, the BBC send commentators to all the Premier League matches played on a Saturday, so he has been able to commentate on a Premier League match virtually every week. Mowbray has established himself in the BBC team and has been afforded live match opportunities in the FA Cup, as well as travelling to the 2006 World Cup, Euro 2008 and the women's World Cup in China in autumn 2007.

Alongside his BBC commitments Mowbray has also contributed frequently to Eurosport's coverage since 2004 and has occasionally covered matches for Setanta Sports. From January 2010 until 2014, he hosted the Yorkshire & Lincolnshire edition of the BBC's regional football show Late Kick Off, and the following month he commentated on the BBC's live coverage of the 2010 Football League Cup Final. He also commentated on the 2011 and 2012 finals.

Mowbray was the chosen commentator for the BBC's coverage of England games at the 2010 World Cup following the retirement of John Motson from live commentary duties. He went on to commentate on England during Euro 2012 including England's eventual quarter-final shoot-out defeat to Italy.

He was also chosen by the BBC to commentate the BBC's coverage of the England matches in the Euro 2020 tournament.

In 2024 and 2025, Mowbray commentated on the revived edition of hit game show Gladiators.

=== BT Sport (2015–present) ===
Since BT Sport acquired the domestic exclusive rights for the UEFA club competitions for the UK and Republic of Ireland from ITV and Sky Sports in 2015, Mowbray returned his Champions League commentaries since covering the network in 1999 for some matches on their channels.

=== IMG (2016–present) ===
Since the start of 2016–17 season, Mowbray went to commentate for the English-language UEFA Champions League and the Europa League world feed commentary for the international viewers outside of the countries with the exclusive rights, but on the 2020 final, he replaced Tony Jones for the Champions League final live commentary duties. As part of his work for IMG, Mowbray commentated on Wrexham's FA Cup ties on US television network ESPN.

== Personal life ==
Mowbray continues to live in Haxby, York with his family. He plays cricket regularly for Bishopthorpe Cricket Club second team, and occasionally for the first team. He is a supporter of York City Football Club.

== Awards ==
- 1998 Sony Radio Academy Award (for Metro Radio commentary on Sunderland v Charlton play-off final)
- 1999 Best Newcomer in TV Sport Royal Television Society
