= Ella-Mae Rayner =

British gymnast and television personality (born 1995)

Personal information
- Nicknames: "Ella"; Comet
- Born: Ella-Mae Rayner; 24 April 1995 (age 31) Hemel Hempstead, Hertfordshire, South East of England
- Education: Birmingham University
- Occupations: Elite gymnast; fitness model; television personality
- Height: 5 ft 8 in (173 cm)
- Spouse: James Exton (2026-present)

Ella-Mae Rayner (born 24 April 1995) is an English former elite-level gymnast, fitness model and television personality, known for appearing as Comet in BBC's sports game show Gladiators.

== Early life and education ==
Ella-Mae Rayner was born on 24 April 1995 in Hemel Hempstead, Hertfordshire. She gained a sports degree from the University of Birmingham.

== Career ==
Rayner previously competed in elite level gymnastics in her younger years, diving as a teen and then cheerleading at national level during her time at university. She stood out for being a tall girl for that level of gymnastics. However, a serious ankle injury changed her career. Unable to continue with cheerleading or gymnastics, Rayner found herself in the gym. Nowadays she trains up to six days a week, in addition to working as a fitness model and coach.

She has also gained a following on social media, primarily on Instagram and TikTok, on the latter of which she has over 600,000 followers. In 2023, she was named as one of the Gladiators in the game show of the same name. Earning the fierce moniker "Comet", she has been described as the "new [generation's] Jet" (Diane Youdale), who herself also came from a similar gymnastics background. Due to her elegance, dynamic flexibility and strength, Rayner's favourite event on the show is "Hang Tough", in which she suffered a severe leg injury during the filming of the first series. Her appearances were restricted to three episodes, as she was forced to retire for the rest of the series. However, she was said to have made a full recovery and returned "even stronger" for the second series.

== Personal life ==
Rayner married entrepreneur James Exton on 6 August 2026.
