= Zack George =

British CrossFit athlete and television personality (born 1990)

Personal information
- Born: Zack Edward George; 13 July 1990 (age 35) Leicester, Leicestershire, England
- Occupations: CrossFit athlete; fitness model; television personality
- Height: 6 ft (183 cm)
- Weight: 107 kg (236 lb)
- Spouse: Samantha Brown
- Children: 2

Zack Edward George (born 13 July 1990) is an English elite CrossFit athlete, fitness model and television personality, known for appearing as "Steel" on the British television sports endurance game show Gladiators. In 2020, he won the UK CrossFit Open and was dubbed the "fittest man in the United Kingdom".

== Early life ==
Zack Edward George was born on 13 July 1990 in Leicester, England to a Guyanese father and an English mother. George was overweight as a child and said that until the age of 14, "he'd have McDonald's four or five times a week and big bags of Haribo every day after school."

== Career ==
George, age 18, pursued a single year personal training course at Loughborough University, after working for a chain of gyms. In 2012, George began a period training as a CrossFit athlete, and in 2020 he placed well in the UK CrossFit Open. He qualified for the CrossFit Games, however lost his spot due to the COVID-19 pandemic.

In January 2024, he began appearing as "Steel" on the television endurance sports game show Gladiators. George appeared as Steel alongside fellow Gladiator, Giant (Jamie Bigg) at Sheffield railway station, to promote the revived game show.

== Personal life ==
George has a daughter, born in 2023. Previously he had a son (2025) deceased following premature birth. He married Samantha Brown in 2024.

== Filmography ==
Year	Title	Role	Ref.
2024–present	Gladiators	Steel	
2024	Blue Peter	Steel	
2024	Comic Relief	Steel	
