= Jade Packer =

British fitness coach, sprinter and television personality (born 1998)

Personal information
- Nickname: Electro
- Born: Jade Lois I Packer; 19 May 1998 (age 28) Southend-on-Sea, Essex, East of England, England
- Home town: Chelmsford, Essex, East of England, England
- Education: University of Sheffield
- Occupations: Bodybuilder; sports model; television personality
- Height: 5 ft 8 in (173 cm)
- Weight: 70 kg (154 lb)

Sport
- Country: Great Britain
- Sport: Sprinting

Achievements and titles
- Personal bests: 100m: 12.69; 200m: 25.86

Jade Lois I Packer (born 19 May 1998) is an English gold medal holding bodybuilder, sports model, former sprinter and television personality, known from the role of "Electro" on BBC One game show Gladiators. In her youth, she was titled as one of the "Top 10 Fastest Runners in the UK".

== Early life ==
Jade Lois I Packer was born in Essex, East of England on 19 May 1998. From an early age, she enjoyed sprinting, and competed at National level for the Great Britain and Northern Ireland.

== Career ==
At just aged 12, Packer ranked in the "Top 10 Fastest Runners in the UK" for 150 metres. Later, she has achieved many titles from various championships over both 100 metres and 200 metres.

Packer got into bodybuilding at the age of 18, after discovering the sport on Instagram. Her dedication to training won her 4 x Top 3 UKBFF Placings in the Wellness Category, as well as an invite to compete at the Arnold Classic and an IFBB Elite Pro Card by taking Gold at the English Grand Prix. Now training in CrossFit, with a unique "hybrid-style" that incorporates her athletic background, Packer describes running as 'still her forte' alongside strength and power. Since 2024, she has appeared on the BBC's sports game show Gladiators as "Electro". She believed that it is a "good opportunity for the new generation" to see her in the program, and hopes to be an inspiration.

Packer is also successful influencer in social medias, and boasts with around 40,000 followers on her Instagram. She has become a "prominent figure" in the fitness community through her role as an online coach and sports model, and her unique approach to training has helped many.

== Personal life ==
Packer stands at figures 5 ft 8 in and 154 lbs. Away from the gym and training, she says she enjoys dancing and "attending raves".
