= Gladiators (2024 British TV series) =

British television game show

- Genre: Game show
- Created by: John Ferraro; Dann Carr
- Presented by: Bradley Walsh; Barney Walsh
- Starring: Mark Clattenburg; Sonia Mkoloma; Lee Phillips; The Gladiators
- Voices of: Guy Mowbray
- Country of origin: United Kingdom
- Original language: English
- No. of series: 3
- No. of episodes: 35 (including celebrity specials)

Production
- Executive producers: Dan Baldwin; Lou Brown; Dom Bird
- Producers: Reshmi Bajnath; James Pratt
- Production locations: Sheffield Arena, Sheffield, England
- Running time: 60 minutes
- Production companies: Hungry Bear Media; MGM Alternative UK

Original release
- Network: BBC One
- Release: 13 January 2024 – present

Related
- Gladiators (1992–2000); Gladiators (2008–2009)

Gladiators is a British television series which began airing on BBC One and BBC iPlayer on 13 January 2024. It is the second revival of the 1992 Gladiators series on ITV, after the 2008 series on Sky One. The series is produced by Hungry Bear Media and MGM Alternative UK.

The series is presented by Bradley Walsh and his son, Barney. Each episode consists of four players, known as 'contenders' – two male and two female – competing in a series of physically challenging events against the show's resident 'Gladiators', a group of elite athletes – such as bodybuilders or track and field athletes – and eventually competing in one contenders-only final event, the Eliminator. The series has introduced a total of 18 new Gladiators. The series consists of the heats, the quarter-finals, the semi-finals and a grand final, to determine the overall champions. It is refereed by Mark Clattenburg, assisted by Sonia Mkoloma and Lee Phillips, with voice-over commentary provided by Guy Mowbray.

Upon its release, the revived series of Gladiators became one of the most successful family entertainment launches for the BBC in seven years, attracting more than six million viewers during its premiere episode, and scoring nearly nine million during the whole first series. The BBC subsequently commissioned Gladiators: Epic Pranks, a spin-off children's prank series for CBBC. The fifteen-episode series, filmed behind the scenes of the main programme, and hosted by Gladiator Nitro, started airing in February 2025.

Alongside the commissioning of a second series, which began airing in January 2025, a "one-off" celebrity special, which was filmed alongside the second series, was aired on New Year's Day 2025 on BBC One; the episode featured Rob Beckett, Joel Dommett, Ellie Taylor and Louise Minchin as the contenders taking on the Gladiators. A second celebrity special aired on Christmas Day 2025, this time with Sam Thompson, Joe Wicks, Vogue Williams and Nicola Adams as the contenders. In March 2025, during the Red Nose Day 2025, a comedy sketch of Gladiators was seen, in which comedian Chabuddy G took on Gladiator Bionic in Duel.

In April 2025, it was announced that Gladiators was to embark on a new live arena tour across the cities of the UK, including Liverpool, Manchester, London, Birmingham and Glasgow, in November and December 2025. During the tour, the super fans of the programme can meet the Gladiators in person, and witness live action on the arena floor, as the Gladiators face some of returning contenders from the first two series of the reboot. The tour is being hosted by Maia Beth and Radzi Chinyanganya. After the success of the first tour, a second will take place from October 2026, adding in new locations Aberdeen and Newcastle.

== Production ==
=== Background and development ===
The original LWT series of Gladiators aired between 1992 and 2000 on ITV and its first revival aired on Sky One in 2008 and 2009. In July 2022, it was reported that the BBC were in talks with Metro-Goldwyn-Mayer, who hold the rights to the original format, to relaunch the show on BBC One. The BBC later announced that the revival, produced by Hungry Bear Media and MGM Television, would air in 2023.

The casting for the new contenders took place across England, Scotland, Wales and Northern Ireland in April 2023. The following month it was announced that Bradley Walsh would co-host the revived series alongside his son Barney.

=== Filming and release ===
Filming of the programme took place at the Sheffield Arena, which previously hosted the 1995 live shows for the original ITV series, in June 2023. Tickets to attend filming of the series were free. Applause Store, the company who oversaw ticket distribution, stated that there was an "unprecedented demand" for tickets and the venue reached its 3,000 capacity earlier than anticipated, which led to ticketholders being denied entry. In a statement, Applause Store said that entrance would be on a "first-come first-served" basis dependent on capacity, and that there was no guarantee of admission to the venue.

Gladiators Giant, Nitro, Fury and Fire made an appearance during the Strictly Come Dancing finale in mid-December 2023, where Fire stated that the programme would premiere in January 2024. The first official trailer of the show was released on 25 December 2023, showing both new and classic events. On 3 January 2024, the BBC announced that the series would premiere on 13 January at 5.50 pm on BBC One and BBC iPlayer. The revival of Gladiators attracted an audience of 6 million viewers, becoming the biggest entertainment launch for the BBC in seven years.

Owing to the ratings success, BBC bosses announced that they had been planning for the next series, which was filmed in August 2024 at the Sheffield Arena, and airing in January 2025. According to a BBC boss, there would be some adjustments to the flow of the game, and some new events for the second series, but all of the Gladiators from the first series were set to return. The casting for the contenders of the second series closed in June 2024. During the broadcast of the show's second series, BBC again renewed the show for a third series, with filming taking place in summer 2025. The following year, the day after the third series premiered on 17 January 2026, the BBC renewed the show for a fourth series which was filmed in July/August 2026. The series is due to air in early 2027 on BBC One.

== Format ==
The format of Gladiators follows that of the previous series, where two men and two women compete against the Gladiators before taking on each other on The Eliminator obstacle course, and the infamous "Travelator". The series follows a knock-out tournament format of preliminary heats leading to finals.

=== Events ===
The first revived series of Gladiators saw the return of the classic events: Hang Tough, The Wall, Powerball, Duel, and Gauntlet.

Some Brand-new events have appeared in the revived series. Collision, The Edge and The Ring debuted in Season 1, Unleash in Season 2 and Destruction and Everest in Season 3.

The second series, airing in 2025, saw the return of the first event ever played in the 1990s version, Atlaspheres. This series also saw the introduction of a “Sister-Event” to Atlaspheres named Crash Course. The third series saw the re-introduction of Suspension Bridge which had appeared in the original and 2008 revival series. For unknown reasons The Ring was dropped for Series 3.

== Cast and crew ==
Cast of the first series, including hosts and referees.

=== Presenters ===
The revamped series of Gladiators is hosted by father-son duo Bradley and Barney Walsh. Donna Walsh, Barney's mother and Bradley's wife, was head choreographer for the "G Force" troupe of cheerleaders on the 1992 series. Bradley also has previous connections to the show, having taken part in a "Celebrities vs Jockeys" special episode of the programme in 1997.

=== The Gladiators ===
Throughout May 2023, the 16-strong roster of Gladiators for Series 1 were announced on Morning Live and The One Show, among other media outlets. Profiles were also released on the BBC Media Centre websites.

In January 2025, the BBC announced the addition of two new Gladiators ahead of its second series. Lystus Ebosele and Tom Wilson portray Cyclone and Hammer respectively.

In April 2026, it was announced that male Gladiator Giant (Jamie Bigg) had left the show and will not be returning for the fourth series. Consequently, Scottish strongman champion Tom Stoltman was revealed as a new male gladiator for Series 4.

In August 2026, former rugby union player Joe Marler was announced to be joining the show as Mauler, and was dubbed the first "celebrity Gladiator" due to his already established recognition in the media.

Male Gladiators
| Alias | Portrayed by | Televised series | Live shows | Background |
|---|---|---|---|---|
| Apollo | Alexander Gray | Series 1– | Live Tour 2025, Experience 2026, Live Tour 2026 | Former rugby union and NFL player |
| Bionic | Matty Campbell | Series 1– | Live Tour 2025, Experience 2026, Live Tour 2026 | Bodybuilder and former sprinter and footballer |
| Giant | Jamie Bigg | Series 1–3 | Live Tour 2025 | Former professional bodybuilder and firefighter |
| Hammer | Tom Wilson | Series 2– | Live Tour 2025, Experience 2026, Live Tour 2026 | National rowing champion and personal trainer |
| Legend | Matt Morsia | Series 1– | Live Tour 2025, Live Tour 2026 | Bodybuilder, powerlifter, and former long and triple jumper |
| Mauler | Joe Marler | Series 4– | —N/a | Former rugby union player |
| Nitro | Harry Aikines-Aryeetey | Series 1, 3– (Note: Nitro did not participate in any events in Series 2 due to injury) | Live Tour 2025, Experience 2026, Live Tour 2026 | World and Commonwealth sprinting champion |
| Phantom | Toby Olubi | Series 1– | Live Tour 2025, Experience 2026, Live Tour 2026 | Bobsledder and sprinter |
| Steel | Zack George | Series 1– | Live Tour 2025, Experience 2026, Live Tour 2026 | Elite CrossFit athlete and sports model |
| Viper | Quang Luong | Series 1– | Live Tour 2025, Experience 2026, Live Tour 2026 | Bodybuilder and boxer |
| TBA | Tom Stoltman | Series 4– | —N/a | Three-time World's Strongest Man |

Female Gladiators
| Alias | Portrayed by | Televised series | Live shows | Background |
|---|---|---|---|---|
| Athena | Karenjeet Kaur Bains | Series 1– | Live Tour 2025, Experience 2026, Live Tour 2026 | Three-time Commonwealth powerlifting champion |
| Comet | Ella-Mae Rayner | Series 1– | Live Tour 2025, Experience 2026, Live Tour 2026 | Former elite gymnast, diver, and cheerleader |
| Cyclone | Lystus Ebosele | Series 2–3 | Live Tour 2025, Experience 2026, Live Tour 2026 | Irish powerlifting champion |
| Diamond | Livi Sheldon | Series 1– | Live Tour 2025, Experience 2026, Live Tour 2026 | Bodybuilder and former footballer |
| Dynamite | Emily Steel | Series 1– | Live Tour 2025, Experience 2026, Live Tour 2026 | CrossFit athlete, weightlifter, and former swimmer |
| Electro | Jade Packer | Series 1– | Live Tour 2025, Experience 2026, Live Tour 2026 | Hybrid-athlete, and former bodybuilder and sprinter |
| Fire | Montell Douglas | Series 1– | Live Tour 2025, Experience 2026, Live Tour 2026 | Commonwealth sprint relay champion and former bobsledder, broadcaster |
| Fury | Jodie Ounsley | Series 1– | Live Tour 2025, Experience 2026, Live Tour 2026 | Former rugby union player and coal carrying champion, broadcaster |
| Sabre | Sheli J. McCoy | Series 1– | Live Tour 2025, Experience 2026, Live Tour 2026 | Scottish weightlifting and CrossFit champion |
| TBA | Tabitha Stoecker | Series 4– | —N/a | 2026 Winter Olympics Gold medallist in skeleton, and former circus performer and gymnast |

=== Other cast members ===
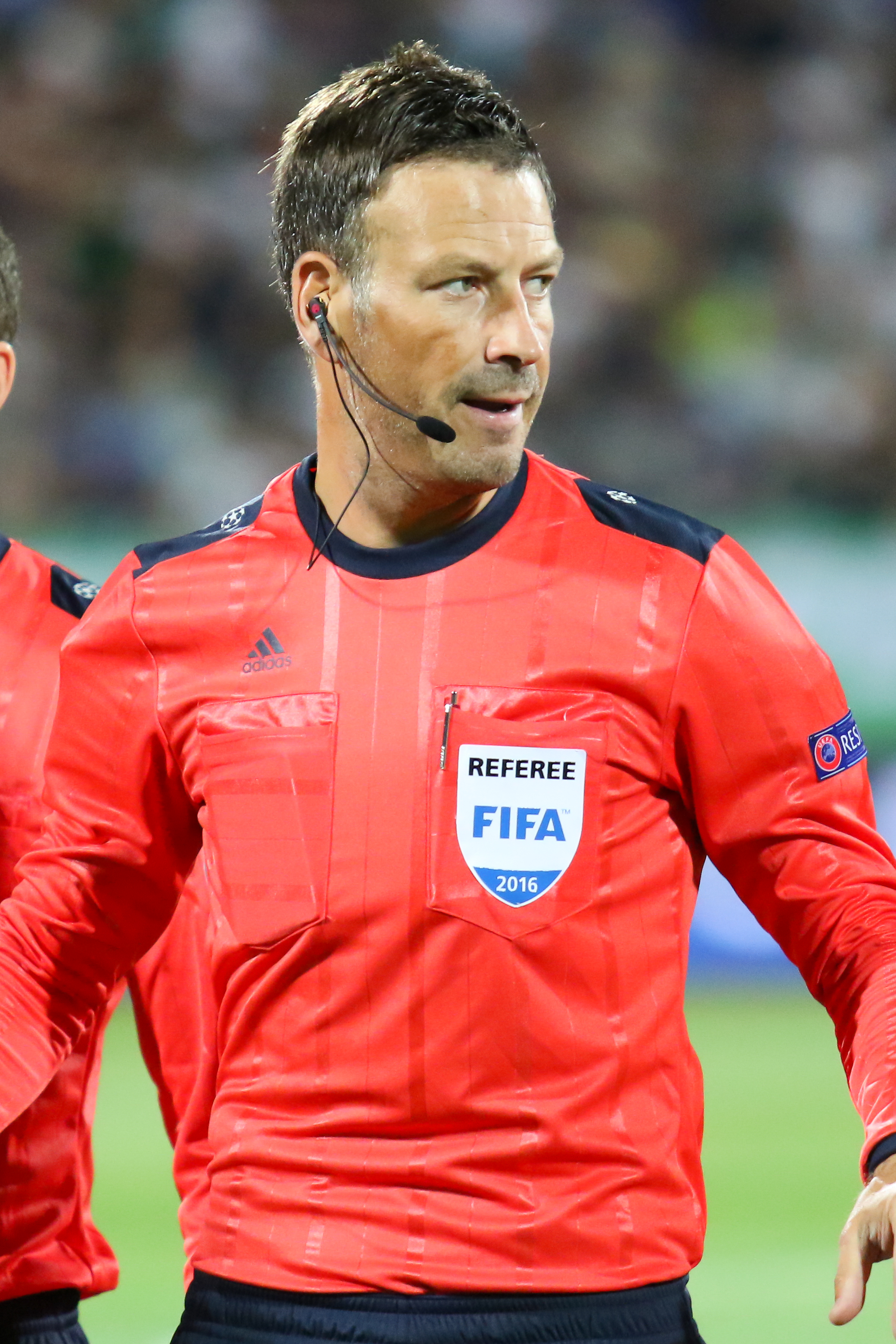
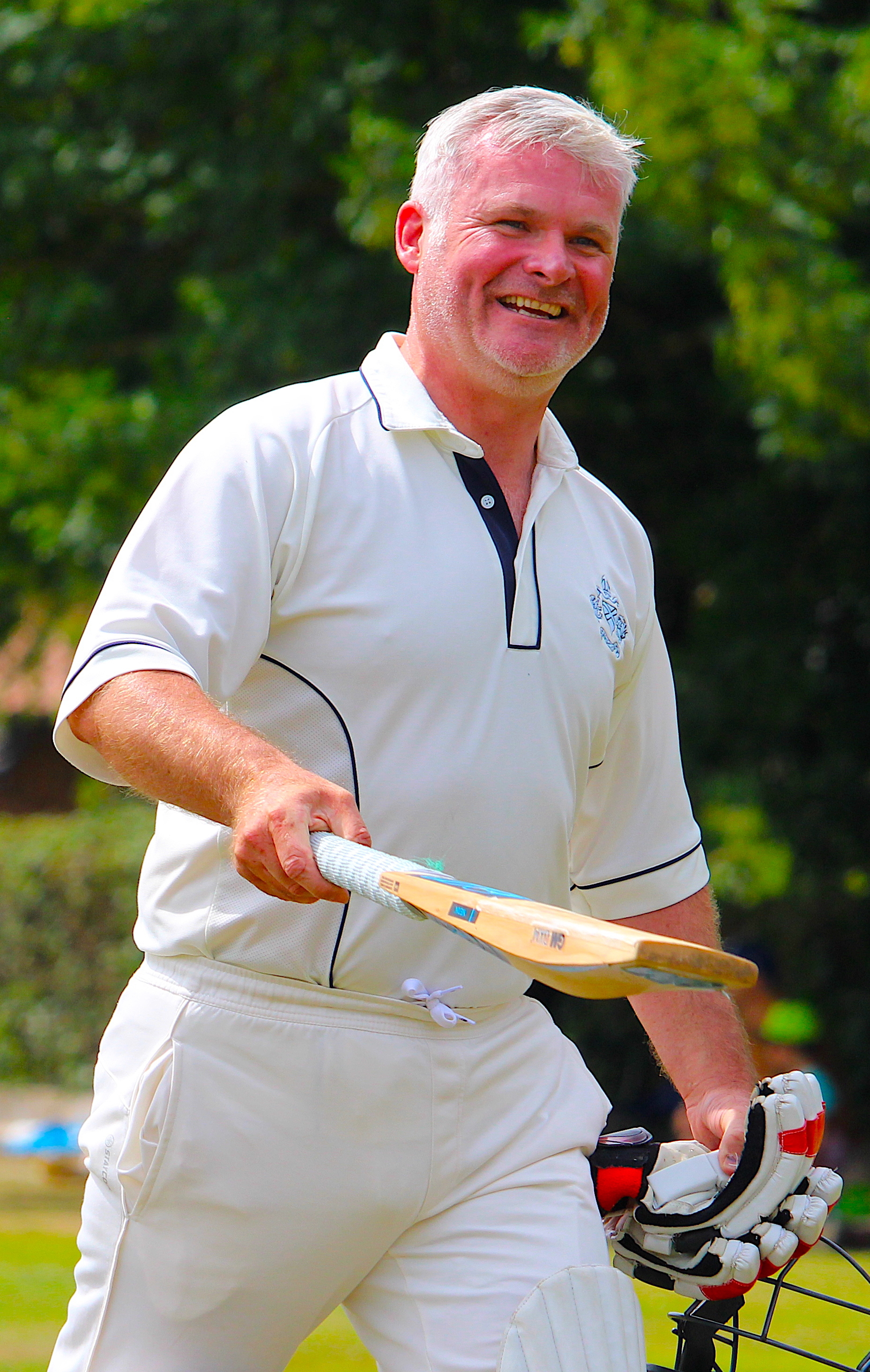
The series is refereed by Mark Clattenburg (left), and commentated by Guy Mowbray (right).

Referees
| Name | Tenure | Background |
|---|---|---|
| Head referee Mark Clattenburg | Series 1– | Clattenburg is one of the UK's most decorated football referees. He adjudicated the 2012 Men's Olympic football final, and the 2016 Champions League and European Championship finals. |
| Sonia Mkoloma | Series 1– | Mkoloma is a former English international netball player. She competed at five Netball World Cups and three Commonwealth Games. Mkoloma made 123 international test appearances. |
| Lee Phillips | Series 1– | Phillips is a fitness professional, model, firefighter and CrossFit athlete. He competed in the World Police and Firefighter Games, winning the Ultimate Firefighter and CrossFit competitions. |
| Unknown assistant referee | Series 3 | An unknown male assistant referee replaced Phillips in the fifth heat and for some events in the first quarter final. Purvinder Kaur Shokar was credited as an assistant referee for the fourth and fifth heat but she did not appear until the final. |
| Purvinder Kaur Shokar | Series 3 | Shokar was first listed in the credits for Series 3 Heat 4 and in Series 3 Heat 5 but she did not appear. However, an unncredited male assistant referee assisted in Heat 5 and Quarter Final 1. Again in the Final, Shokar was credited where she replaced Mkoloma for the whole episode. Shokar is a founder of the Women's Football Academy and is a UEFA-C qualified coach. |

Commentators
| Name | Tenure | Background |
|---|---|---|
| Guy Mowbray | Series 1– | Mowbray is a football commentator. He has provided commentary for the FIFA World Cup, The Africa Cup of Nations, the UEFA European Championships, the Emirates FA Cup, and the Premier League. He has also provided voiceovers for the EA FC video game. |

== Injuries ==
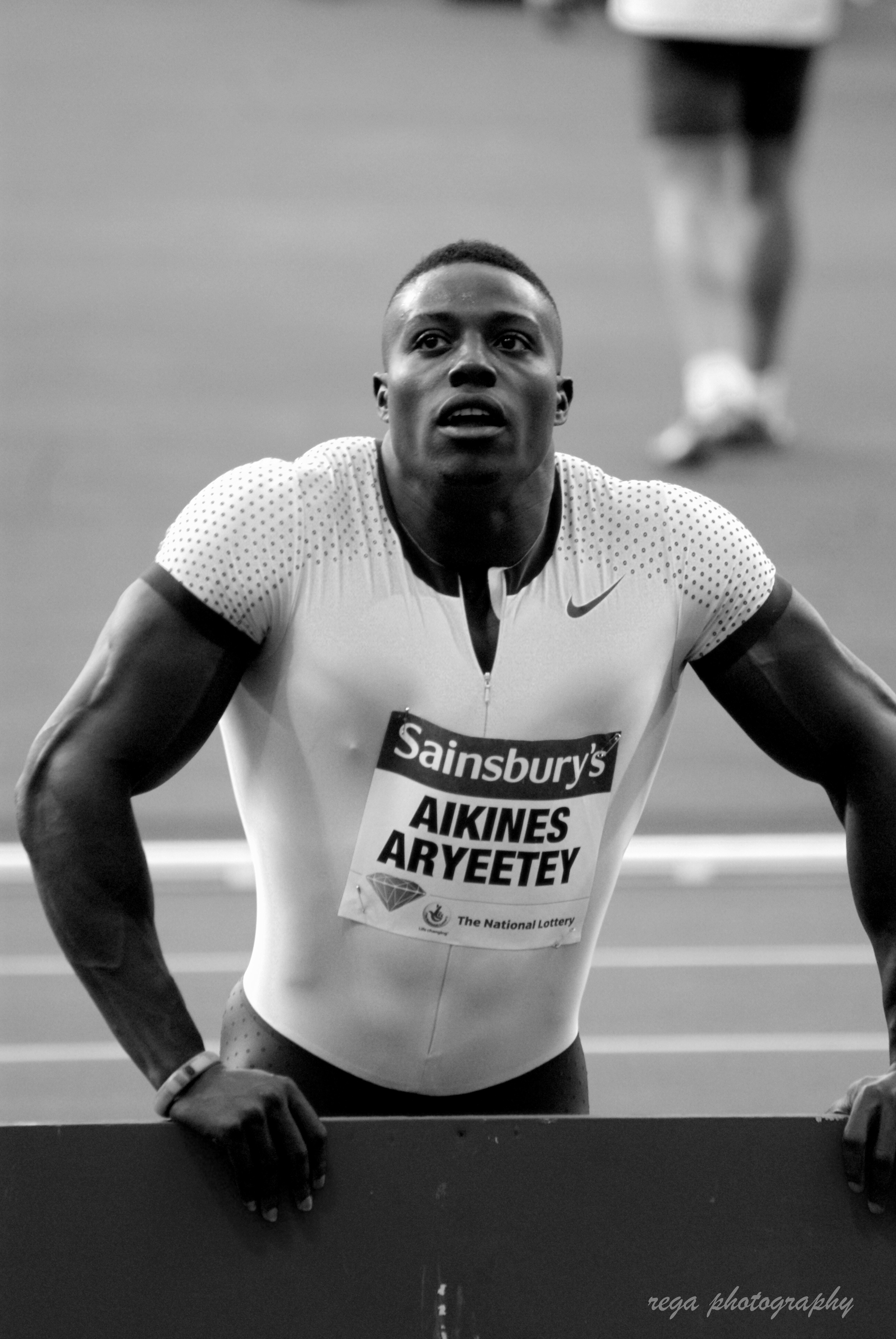
Male Gladiator Nitro (Harry Aikines-Aryeetey) sustained a major knee injury preparing for series 2.

Due to the rough, physical nature of the show, several contestants and Gladiators have suffered a large spectrum of different injures during the filmings. Detailed below are the most notable Gladiator-injuries during the course of a series.

Two of the female Gladiators were injured during the filming of the first series. Comet (Ella-Mae Rayner) sustained several bone fractures in her legs in several places – including the talus – as well as sustaining a Lisfranc injury, three ruptured ligaments, and a dislocated bone, while Sabre (Sheli McCoy) injured and tore her hamstring muscle. Owing to these incidents both of the Gladiators had to go on hiatus for the remainder of the series.

The most notable Gladiator injury of the second season occurred to Nitro (Harry Aikines-Aryeetey), who picked up a knee injury before the filmings began, and was, therefore, forced to step out of competing in the events for the series. He was still seen in the programme, "hyping up" his fellow Gladiators and bringing the "Nitro energy" to the arena. Giant (Jamie Bigg) was also injured in Powerball during one of the heats and he also was out for the series.

The third series has seen the most Gladiator injuries to date. The most notable occurred to Legend (Matt Morsia), who suffered a bicep tear off the bone to his left arm. In addition, Diamond (Livi Sheldon) suffered full ACL tear, sidelining her off the majority of the series. Athena (Karenjeet Kaur Bains) and Bionic (Matty Campbell) also suffered series-ending injuries making sporadic appearances throughout the series.

== Controversies ==
In January 2024, the BBC discovered past use of steroids by Gladiator Giant (Jamie Bigg) from a 2022 YouTube video. The video has since been deleted, and the Gladiator himself stated that he has not been in contact with any kind of "performance enhancing drug" since his professional career ended. The BBC also stated that upon the casting for the Gladiators and contenders, they had to complete multiple tests in case of any prohibited steroid-use; the tests were negative for all of the Gladiators. Consequently, it was reported that Giant would return for the second series of the show.

== Episodes ==
=== Series overview ===
==== Main series ====
Series overview
| Series | Episodes | Originally released | | Series Champions | Runners-Up | Average viewers (millions) |
| Series | Episodes | First released | Last released | Series Champions | Runners-Up | Average viewers (millions) |
|---|---|---|---|---|---|---|
| 1 | 11 | 13 January 2024 | 30 March 2024 | Marie-Louise Nicholson & Finlay Anderson | Bronte Jones & Wesley Male | 6.17 |
| 2 | 11 | 18 January 2025 | 12 April 2025 | Amanda Wah & Joe Fishburn | Aneila Afsar & Mus Dumbuya | 4.73 |
| 3 | 11 | 17 January 2026 | 28 March 2026 | Emily Bell & Josh McDonald | Naomi Church & Tyler Spence | 4.13 |

==== Celebrity special ====
Series overview
| Series | Episodes | Originally released | | Champions | Runners-Up | Viewers (millions) |
| Series | Episodes | First released | Last released | Champions | Runners-Up | Viewers (millions) |
|---|---|---|---|---|---|---|
| I | 1 | 1 January 2025 | 1 January 2025 | Ellie Taylor & Joel Dommett | Louise Minchin & Rob Beckett | 6.04 |
| II | 1 | 25 December 2025 | 25 December 2025 | Vogue Williams & Joe Wicks | Nicola Adams & Sam Thompson | 4.29 |

==== Spin-offs ====
Series overview
| Series | Episodes | Originally released | | Network |
| Series | Episodes | First released | Last released | Network |
|---|---|---|---|---|
| Epic Pranks I | 15 | 15 February 2025 | 13 March 2025 | CBBC |
| Epic Pranks II | 20 | 16 January 2026 | 12 February 2026 | CBBC |

=== Series 1 (2024) ===
The first series premiered on 13 January 2024, and ran through the first quarter of the year. It featured eleven 60-minute long episodes.

The series became a ratings success on the BBC network, with the series averaging 6.02 million viewers, and constantly ranking in the Top 10 weekly most viewed shows on the channel.

| No. overall | No. in series | Title | BBC One airdate | UK viewers (millions) | Weekly Rank |
|---|---|---|---|---|---|
| 1 | 1 | "Heat A (Note: Episodes symboled with letters due to some being aired off the taping order.)" | 13 January 2024 | 8.37 | 1st |
| 2 | 2 | "Heat B" | 20 January 2024 | 7.32 | 1st |
| 3 | 3 | "Heat C" | 27 January 2024 | 6.63 | 5th |
| 4 | 4 | "Heat D" | 3 February 2024 | 6.82 | 3rd |
| 5 | 5 | "Heat E" | 10 February 2024 | 5.94 | 9th |
| 6 | 6 | "Quarter Final A" | 17 February 2024 | 6.05 | 7th |
| 7 | 7 | "Quarter Final B" | 24 February 2024 | 5.65 | 6th |
| 8 | 8 | "Quarter Final C" | 2 March 2024 | 5.41 | 5th |
| 9 | 9 | "Semi Final A" | 9 March 2024 | 4.67 | 6th |
| 10 | 10 | "Semi Final B" | 23 March 2024 | 5.41 | 4th |
| 11 | 11 | "Grand Final" | 30 March 2024 | 5.54 | 4th |

=== Series 2 (2025) ===
The second, 11-part series was commissioned by the BBC, following the ratings success of the first series. The series was filmed in August 2024 at the Sheffield Arena, and began airing in January 2025. The series started with a "one-off" celebrity special, which was aired on New Year's Day 2025.

The series averaged with roughly 5 million viewers, enough for the show to be commissioned for its third series.

| No. overall | No. in series | Title | BBC One airdate | UK viewers (millions) | Weekly Rank |
|---|---|---|---|---|---|
| — | — | "Celebrity Special" | 1 January 2025 | 6.04 | 9th |
Competing in the New Year's "one-off" Celebrity Special edition are TV presenter Louise Minchin and comedians Rob Beckett, Joel Dommett and Ellie Taylor.
| 12 | 1 | "Heat A" | 18 January 2025 | 5.38 | 8th |
| 13 | 2 | "Heat B" | 25 January 2025 | 4.94 | 10th |
| 14 | 3 | "Heat C" | 1 February 2025 | 5.11 | 7th |
| 15 | 4 | "Heat D" | 15 February 2025 | 4.96 | 7th |
| 16 | 5 | "Heat E" | 22 February 2025 | 4.90 | 11th |
| 17 | 6 | "Quarter Final A" | 1 March 2025 | 4.62 | 7th |
| 18 | 7 | "Quarter Final B" | 8 March 2025 | 4.21 | 11th |
| 19 | 8 | "Quarter Final C" | 15 March 2025 | 4.97 | 9th |
| — | — | "Comic Relief Special" | 21 March 2025 | 2.06 | TBA |
In a Red Nose Day 2025 special, Chabuddy G was seen challenging gladiator Bionic (Matty Campbell) in a hilarious round of Duel, in a "Gladiators Sketch".
| 20 | 9 | "Semi Final A" | 22 March 2025 | 4.34 | 12th |
| 21 | 10 | "Semi Final B" | 5 April 2025 | 3.86 | 12th |
| 22 | 11 | "Grand Final" | 12 April 2025 | 4.71 | 6th |

=== Gladiators: Epic Pranks I (2025) ===
The BBC commissioned a 15-episode spin-off series, aimed at children, on the CBBC channel, which aired from February 2025.

The series features the "Secret Prankster" – Nitro (Harry Aikines-Aryeetey) – with his fellow Gladiators competing against each other in a set of games and competitions, as well as a look behind the scenes to their locker rooms and rest of the arena.

| No. overall | No. in series | Title | CBBC airdate |
|---|---|---|---|
| 1 | 1 | "Dynamite!" | 15 February 2025 |
The spin-off series, hosted by Gladiator Nitro (Harry Aikines-Aryeetey), begins. Nitro and Apollo prank Dynamite turning her into a singing banana.
| 2 | 2 | "Fire!" | 18 February 2025 |
For the second episode, Gladiators Nitro and Phantom prank Fire at a kids' birthday party.
| 3 | 3 | "Giant!" | 17 February 2025 |
Giant is pranked by Nitro when he appears as a guest of honour at a fake school award ceremony.
| 4 | 4 | "Apollo!" | 18 February 2025 |
Nitro pranks Apollo with fake influencer Aubry Devonne Keep, causing a big splash! The letters in his name when rearranged spell out “You’ve been pranked”.
| 5 | 5 | "Steel!" | 19 February 2025 |
Nitro and Sabre prank Steel at a fake Halloween photoshoot with a huge spider costume, bats and a surprising ghost.
| 6 | 6 | "Cyclone!" | 24 February 2025 |
Nitro and Fury prank Cyclone, who thinks she is filming an animal-themed exercise video dressed as a turtle.
| 7 | 7 | "Diamond!" | 25 February 2025 |
Nitro pranks Diamond when the guest on a live TV show cannot stop pumping!
| 8 | 8 | "Apollo Again!" | 26 February 2025 |
Nitro pranks Apollo again - this time he thinks he is filming for a Gladiator video game set in ancient Greece.
| 9 | 9 | "Viper!" | 3 March 2025 |
Nitro pranks Viper with a fake interview that ends with an unexpected splashdown, but he does not find it funny!
| 10 | 10 | "Hammer!" | 4 March 2025 |
Nitro pranks Hammer with a hysterical, historical Gladiator mix-up in a magazine interview.
| 11 | 11 | "Bionic!" | 5 March 2025 |
Bionic ends up dressed as a rabbit when Nitro pranks him at a fake photoshoot.
| 12 | 12 | "Electro!" | 10 March 2025 |
Nitro pranks Electro at a fake fashion photoshoot when her fabulous, precious dress is ruined.
| 13 | 13 | "Comet!" | 11 March 2025 |
Nitro and Diamond prank Comet at a fake Christmas calendar photoshoot.
| 14 | 14 | "Athena!" | 12 March 2025 |
Nitro and Bionic prank Athena as a massive broccoli at a fake healthy eating film shoot.
| 15 | 15 | "Phantom!" | 13 March 2025 |
Phantom is pranked by Nitro and Steel when he believes he is in a new Gladiators video game.
| S1 | S1 | "Children In Need Special" | 14 November 2025 |
Nitro goes undercover for a special Children In Need prank on Apollo and recruits Sabre, Alfie Watts and Pudsey to help.

=== Series 3 (2026) ===
The third series was commissioned by the BBC to be produced in summer of 2025, to be aired from January 2026.

The series also had another Celebrity Special episode during the Christmas season, which was again produced alongside the main series.

| No. overall | No. in series | Title | BBC One airdate | UK viewers (millions) | Weekly Rank |
|---|---|---|---|---|---|
| — | — | "Celebrity Special" | 25 December 2025 | 4.29 | 17th |
Competing in the Celebrity Special edition are fitness coach Joe Wicks, TV personality Sam Thompson, presenter and media personality Vogue Williams and former Olympic boxer Nicola Adams.
| 23 | 1 | "Heat A" | 17 January 2026 | 5.14 | 6th |
| 24 | 2 | "Heat B" | 24 January 2026 | 4.74 | 9th |
| 25 | 3 | "Heat C" | 31 January 2026 | 4.75 | 6th |
| 26 | 4 | "Heat D" | 7 February 2026 | 4.74 | 6th |
| 27 | 5 | "Heat E" | 14 February 2026 | 3.56 | 15th |
| 28 | 6 | "Quarter Final A" | 21 February 2026 | 3.16 | 34th |
| 29 | 7 | "Quarter Final B" | 28 February 2026 | 4.14 | 9th |
| 30 | 8 | "Quarter Final C" | 7 March 2026 | 3.54 | 17th |
| 31 | 9 | "Semi Final A" | 14 March 2026 | 3.87 | 11th |
| 32 | 10 | "Semi Final B" | 21 March 2026 | 3.61 | 18th |
| 33 | 11 | "Grand Final" | 28 March 2026 | 4.18 | 9th |

=== Gladiators: Epic Pranks II (2026) ===
On 24 July 2025, BBC recommissioned the successful spin-off for a second series, which is set to feature 20 more 15–20 minute long episodes in the lead of Prankster Nitro (Harry Aikines-Aryeetey).

In this series, the Gladiators also face different dares, or face-offs in locations outside the arena, like the Gym or at a Hotel reception. Celebrity faces like JB Gill and Dame Maggie Aderin-Pocock also make guest appearances in the episodes.

| No. overall | No. in series | Title | CBBC airdate |
|---|---|---|---|
| 16 | 1 | "Giant, Apollo, Fury, Athena Funny Farmers!" | 16 January 2026 |
Gladiators Nitro, Legend and Freddie Fraser fool Apollo, Athena, Fury and Giant with a hilarious farm prank!
| 17 | 2 | "Bionic Birdwatching!" | 16 January 2026 |
Nitro and Wildlife presenter Megan McCubbin confuse Bionic with a fake birdwatching club, as he dresses in feathers, makes bizarre bird calls and joins a bird-loving conga.
| 18 | 3 | "Viper, Phantom Rebrand!" | 19 January 2026 |
Nitro hires a fake image guru and, with help from the Gladiator producers, tell Viper and Phantom they need new looks as a prancing unicorn and a lassoing cowboy!
| 19 | 4 | "Hammer, Fire, Nitro Daddiator!" | 20 January 2026 |
Nitro, Fire and Hammer prank a dad who thinks his son is meeting the Gladiators. However, when Hammer does not appear, he is asked to put on a fake wig, beard and costume and stand in!
| 20 | 5 | "Sabre, Legend, Cyclone, Nitro v the Hotel!" | 21 January 2026 |
Nitro, Cyclone, Legend and Sabre compete at a hotel check-in desk as they dare each other with outrageous instructions for the chance to win or tap out and risk losing.
| 21 | 6 | "Electro's Pop Song!" | 26 January 2026 |
Nitro and JB Gill bring boy band chaos, turning Electro's pop song into a note-perfect prank with weird warm-ups, hoodie rage, cheesy pop video moves and snowball choreography.
| 22 | 7 | "Fire, Nitro, Diamond, Cyclone v the Restarant!" | 27 January 2026 |
Will a magic banana, french fries, an ostrich or a big bottom burp cause a tap out?
| 23 | 8 | "Comet in Space!" | 28 January 2026 |
Comet face fake space helmets and meteor showers with Nitro and Dame Maggie Aderin-Pocock.
| 24 | 9 | "Phantom, Fire, Hammer, Nitro v the Gym!" | 29 January 2026 |
Will rubber ducks, silly bird calls, fake gladios or a duel defeat lead to a tap out?
| 25 | 10 | "Sabre, Legend, Cyclone, Nitro v the Hotel Rematch!" | 30 January 2026 |
Will the horsing around, a piano break, a worm or a complimentary banana prove too much?
| 26 | 11 | "Fury's Relaxation Retreat!" | 2 February 2026 |
Fury gets pranked with breathing exercises with fart whistles, bubble yoga and a snail oracle.
| 27 | 12 | "Dynamite, Giant, Nitro, Comet V The Restaurant!" | 3 February 2026 |
Will fake bumble bees, jelly wobbles, bottom burps or a Giant conga be a dare too far?
| 28 | 13 | "Apollo, Hammer, Fire, Nitro V The Exercise Class!" | 4 February 2026 |
Will bottom burps, magic sporty spells, pom-poms or meows cause a tap out?
| 29 | 14 | "Dynamite Gets Arty!" | 5 February 2026 |
Dynamite faces messy painting and a ruined celebrity masterpiece at a fake art auction.
| 30 | 15 | "Fire, Nitro, Diamond, Cyclone v the Restaurant Rematch!" | 6 February 2026 |
A robot, rockstar, broccoli or water over the head - the Gladiators dish out the dares!
| 31 | 16 | "Phantom, Fire, Hammer, Nitro v the Gym Rematch!" | 9 February 2026 |
Donut dares, haunted gym bikes, motivational mayhem and personal bests. Will they tap out?
| 32 | 17 | "Nitro, Fire, Hammer, Apollo v The Exercise Class Rematch!" | 10 February 2026 |
Will ponytails, air guitars, inflatable flamingos or zebras make the fitness four tap out?
| 33 | 18 | "Giant, Dynamite, Comet, Nitro v The Restaurant Rematch!" | 11 February 2026 |
Beatboxing, singing burgers, flat cola and a leaping salmon. Will any be a dare too far?
| 34 | 19 | "Gladiators Revenge On Nitro!" | 12 February 2026 |
The Gladiators get their own back on Nitro in an epic prank full of pie pandemonium!

=== Series 4 (2027) ===
Casting for the contenders for the fourth series began in January 2026 and filming took place during late July/early August of that year. The series is due to be screened in early 2027 on BBC One.

== Reception ==
=== Critical reception ===
The series received positive reviews, with The Guardian describing it as a "phenomenal reboot" of its original show. In a highly positive thinkpiece, The Independent praised the show's updated sensibilities, writing: "The entire show is a testament to the fact that we can still enjoy those things from our youth, and that 'updating them for a modern audience' doesn't mean ripping out the heart of what made them appealing in the first place." On his The Rest Is Entertainment podcast, Richard Osman praised the casting and described the series debut as a "smash hit".

Ulrika Jonsson, who presented the original programme, said the reboot had done a "good job" overall, but criticised the absence of cheerleaders that had been used in previous iterations of the show, stating that the cheerleaders brought "another level" to the production.

The show's official Instagram account, which covers exclusive and behind the scenes footage, has gathered more than 100,000 followers to date, with each of the Gladiators' individual accounts gathering tens of thousands of followers.

=== Awards and nominations ===
| Year | Group | Award | Nominated | Result | Ref(s) |
|---|---|---|---|---|---|
| 2024 | National Television Awards | The Bruce Forsyth Entertainment Award | Gladiators, Series 1 | Longlisted | |
| 2024 | Rose d'Or | Studio Entertainment | Gladiators | Won | |
| 2025 | Broadcast Awards | Best Entertainment Programme | Gladiators | Nominated | |
| 2025 | National Television Awards | The Bruce Forsyth Entertainment Award | Gladiators, Series 2 | Longlisted | |
| 2025 | BAFTA Scotland | Favourite Scot On Screen | Sheli McCoy (Sabre) | Won | |
| 2026 | National Television Awards | The Bruce Forsyth Entertainment Award | Gladiators, Series 3 | Nominated | |

== Merchandise ==
=== Gladiators: Ready!, The Official Companion Book ===
Bloomsbury Publishing released an official companion book for the series in hardback on 7 November 2024. It includes an extended number of behind-the-scenes details of the show, including training - and eating/dieting routines of the Gladiators themselves – with one chapter dedicated for each of the sixteen Gladiators from Series One – and more deep-in details about the show itself, including stats, etc.

=== Other merchandise ===
Show's trademark goods like the iconic "Foam Fingers", or full set of costumes including T-shirts and/or caps can be purchased typically prized from between £3 to £50 online. Gladiators Live Tour and Gladiators Experience merchandise was also introduced including t-shirts, hoodies, posters, drinking bottles and other collectibles exclusive to these events.

== International adaptations ==
Based on the ratings success of the BBC reboot of Gladiators, several other countries have picked up the format and adapted it to their networks. International rights are held by the production company MGM Studios.

=== International versions ===
Legend: Currently airing Upcoming version/season No longer airing Current status unknown

| Country | Title | Presenters | Filming location(s) | Channel | First aired |
|---|---|---|---|---|---|
| Australia | Gladiators Australia | Beau Ryan; Liz Ellis | Disney Studios Australia | Network 10 | 15 January 2024 |
| France | Gladiators: Qui Osera Les Défier? (Gladiators: Who Will Dare To Challenge Them?) | Hélène Mannarino; Jean-Pierre Foucault | Aren'Ice | TF1 | 27 December 2024 |
| Germany | Gladiators - Die Show Der Giganten (Gladiators - The Show Of Giants) | Frank Buschmann; Jan Köppen; Laura Wontorra | Messe Düsseldorf | Amazon Prime Video; RTL | September 2026 |
| Russia | Гладиаторы; Gladiatory (Gladiators) | Nikita Panfilov; Kirill Kosharin | WeiT Media Studios Moscow | NTV | 11 May 2025 |
| United Kingdom | Gladiators | Bradley Walsh; Barney Walsh | Sheffield Arena | BBC One | 13 January 2024 |
| United Kingdom | Gladiators: Celebrity Special | Bradley Walsh; Barney Walsh | Sheffield Arena | BBC One | 1 January 2025 |
| United Kingdom | Gladiators: Epic Pranks | Harry Aikines-Aryeetey | Sheffield Arena | CBBC | 15 February 2025 |
| United States (Flagship) | American Gladiators | The Miz; Rocsi Diaz | Aren'Ice | Amazon Prime Video | 17 April 2026 |

=== Australia ===
Based on the new BBC revival of Gladiators, the Australian channel Network 10 announced their own version to be produced for the calendar year. The series was hosted by Beau Ryan and Liz Ellis, two Australian sporting veterans, and saw Australian-New Zealander Gladiators like "Phoenix" or "Viking" being portrayed by Sandor Earl and Jett Kenny respectively. The series was refereed by former Australian Gladiator "Hammer", Mark McGaw.

The show was cancelled after only one commissioned series, which "failed to find its audience" by the end of the series. The intention was for the two winning contestants to return for the following series as new Gladiators.

=== France ===
The French version was commissioned to be aired from December 2024 on TF1 network. The show was hosted by Hélène Mannarino and Jean-Pierre Foucault, with live on-arena commentary provided by Denis Brogniart.

Just like the Australian revival, it was ultimately cancelled before the first series ended, as the programme was poorly received and attracted low ratings. Many viewers told that the version was rather "blatant" or "boring".

=== Germany ===
A German iteration of the BBC reboot was announced in September 2025, to be produced and broadcast during 2026 for German network RTL and Amazon Prime Video. It is set to be their first domestic iteration of the format since participation in the International Gladiators tournament.

=== Russia ===
A Russian adaption of the format based on the BBC programme was announced by NTV, and its production began in March 2025. It began airing in May 2025, with Nikita Panfilov and Kirill Kosharin as its presenters. Just like with Germany, it is their first domestic series since sending "unofficial" Gladiators to the International Gladiators competition in the mid-1990s.

=== United States ===
After the success of the British reboot, the American producers showed their interest of rebooting the very original American Gladators format, in the lead of original producer and creator of the franchise, Johnny Ferraro. In May 2025, Deadline announced WWE superstar Mike 'The Miz' Mizanin as the host of the new reboot of the American Gladiators, based upon the success of the BBC reboot, to be aired on Amazon Prime Video from April 2026.

== Gladiators: Live Tour ==
=== 2025 ===
The very first live arena tour based on the BBC show was set to run from the start of November to the end of December 2025, across different cities of the mainland England and Scotland.

Gladiators Live Tour displays of superhuman strength, lightning speed and awe-inspiring athleticism across four gripping events of the show, and the Eliminator. Each of the two-hour long shows showcase "spectacular action and fierce competition", where some of the main show's gladiators take on previous contenders across the already aired BBC reboot. The live tours also allow the fans of the show to meet and greet with the Gladiators, and have a closer look at the arena floor.

Hosting the tour are Maia Beth, a London-based DJ and radio presenter on BBC Radio 1, and Radzi Chinyanganya, a former UK Gladiators contender. The tour is being overseen by the TV referee Mark Clattenburg with the assistance of Sonia Mkoloma and Lee Phillips. Like for the main televised series, the official Instagram account of the live tour, which has currently over 2,000 followers, covers the highlights and main events relating to the tour.

The tour is following:

==== Liverpool M&S Bank Arena: 1–2 November ====
- Events played: Duel, Powerball, Gauntlet, The Wall, The Eliminator
- Referees: Mark Clattenburg and Sonia Mkoloma
- Gladiators participating: Apollo, Giant, Hammer, Phantom, Steel & Viper / Comet, Dynamite, Electro, Fire, Fury & Sabre
- Attendance: 6,000+

==== London O2 Arena: 8–9 November ====
- Events played: Duel, Powerball, Gauntlet, The Wall, The Eliminator
- Referees: Clattenburg, Mkoloma and Lee Phillips
- Gladiators participating: Apollo, Giant, Hammer, Legend, Nitro, Phantom, Steel & Viper / Comet, Cyclone, Dynamite, Electro, Fire & Sabre
- Attendance: 12,000
- Notes: Legend's first appearance since major injury whilst filming for Series 3.

==== Manchester AO Arena: 22–23 November ====
- Events played: Duel, Powerball, Gauntlet, The Wall, The Eliminator
- Referees: Clattenburg and Mkoloma
- Gladiators participating: Apollo, Giant, Hammer, Phantom, Steel & Viper / Comet, Cyclone, Dynamite, Electro, Fire & Sabre
- Notes: Giant and Viper's final tourings marking their appearances on different pantomime shows at the end of the year. Also Giant's last known outing as a Gladiator after being sacked from Series 4 of the TV show consequently.

==== London Wembley Arena: 29–30 November ====
- Events played: Duel, Powerball, Gauntlet, The Wall, The Eliminator
- Referees: Clattenburg, Mkoloma and Phillips
- Gladiators participating: Apollo, Bionic, Hammer, Legend, Nitro, Phantom & Steel / Comet, Cyclone, Dynamite, Electro, Fire & Sabre
- Notes: Bionic's first official appearance during the tours since major shoulder injury earlier the year.

==== Birmingham bp pulse LIVE: 13–14 December ====
- Events played: Duel, Powerball, Gauntlet, The Wall, The Eliminator
- Referees: Clattenburg, Mkoloma and Phillips
- Gladiators participating: Apollo, Bionic, Hammer, Legend, Phantom & Steel / Comet, Cyclone, Dynamite, Electro, Fire & Sabre
- Notes: Athena's home town show

==== Glasgow OVO Hydro: 20–21 December ====
- Events played: Duel, Powerball, Gauntlet, The Wall, The Eliminator
- Referees: Clattenburg, Mkoloma and Phillips
- Gladiators participating: Apollo, Bionic, Hammer, Legend, Phantom & Steel / Cyclone, Dynamite, Electro, Fire & Sabre
- Notes: Last tour of the year. Entitled as "Sabre's home show" given she is from Scotland.

=== 2026 ===
Following to the sold-out Live tour on the end of 2025, a second round is taking its place from October to December 2026, touring once again across Scotland and mainland England, adding in new locations from Aberdeen and Newcastle.

==== Aberdeen P&J Live: 10–11 October ====
- Events played: Duel, Powerball, Gauntlet, The Wall, The Eliminator
- Referees: Clattenburg
- Gladiators participating: Apollo, Bionic, Hammer, Legend, Steel & Viper / Athena, Cyclone, Dynamite, Electro, Fury & Sabre
- Notes: A new location. Athena's first time competing in a tour after injury.

==== Glasgow OVO Hydro: 24–25 October ====
- Events played: Duel, Powerball, Gauntlet, The Wall, The Eliminator
- Referees: Clattenburg and Mkoloma
- Gladiators participating: Hammer, Nitro, Phantom, Steel & Viper / Cyclone, Diamond, Electro, Fire, Fury & Sabre
- Notes: Diamond's first official tour since injury.

==== London Wembley Arena: 7–8 November ====
- Events played: Duel, Powerball, Gauntlet, The Wall, The Eliminator
- Referees: Clattenburg, Mkoloma and Phillips
- Gladiators participating: Apollo, Legend, Nitro, Phantom, Steel & Viper / Diamond, Dynamite, Electro, Fire, Fury & Sabre

==== Manchester AO Arena: 14–15 November ====
- Events played: Duel, Powerball, Gauntlet, The Wall, The Eliminator
- Referees: Clattenburg, Mkoloma and Phillips
- Gladiators participating: Hammer, Legend, Nitro, Steel & Viper / Comet, Cyclone, Diamond, Dynamite, Fury & Sabre
- Notes: Comet's first tour since 2025

== Gladiators Experience ==
Based upon the success of both Gladiators and the Gladiators Live Tour, the National Exhibition Centre in Birmingham hosted an exclusive event in Summer 2026, where the fans of the show got, for the first time ever, the opportunity to test their skills across Hang Tough, Duel, The Wall, Unleash and the legendary Eliminator, as well as access to some all-exclusive features like "The Vault" and the Gladiators' Training Facility.

With an exclusive package, the fans attending had an opportunity to meet and greet with some of the show's gladiators themselves, in separate dates. Diamond, Hammer, Fury and Nitro were among some of them appearing from the start.
