= Hélène Mannarino =

French journalist, television and radio presenter

- Born: 17 July 1990 (age 36); Valenciennes, France
- Education: University of Lille
- Occupations: Television journalist Television anchor
- Years active: 2014–present
- Employer(s): LCI; TF1

Hélène Mannarino (born 17 July 1990) is a French journalist, television, and radio presenter. Having a passion for media and journalism at a young age, she interned at several radio stations and national television channels before appearing for the first time on screen in 2014 as a columnist on channel France Ô, before later joining C8.

In 2018, she joined the TF1 Group and became presenter for the program Appels d'urgence on TFX. She also presented several columns on the channel LCI and the radio station Europe 1.

== Early life and education ==
Hélène Mannarino was born in Valenciennes in the department of Nord, and grew up in the town of Saint-Saulve. She is of Italian descent. At the age of 10, Mannarino became interested in journalism, taking an interest in French presenter and producer Marc-Olivier Fogiel. She joined the audience of the program On ne peut pas plaire à tout le monde. Mannarino studied in Valenciennes at the Saint-Jean Baptiste middle school and the Notre-Dame high school. She completed her middle school internship at the redaction of the regional daily newspaper La Voix du Nord.

Mannarino began her training course with a communications degree in Lille, followed by a history degree at the Charles de Gaulle University. She completed her second year abroad, interning at the radio station RTL. She met Jean-Michel Apathie who collaborated with the station and who allowed her to join the staff of Le Grand Journal as an intern for six months in 2011. During this period, she also joined the European Institute of Journalism but ended the classes after having been hired as an assistant for the program La Nouvelle Édition. She made a validation des acquis and obtained her master's degree.

== Television career ==
She appeared for the first time on screen in 2014 as a columnist for the program Le Lab.Ô on France Ô, with her column titled Les Scoops d'Hélène. She then joined the staff of Le Grand 8 on D8 to present a column titled La semaine d'Hélène in 2015. In September 2016, she stayed on the same channel, re-named C8 in the meantime, and became a columnist for the program Il en pense quoi Camille?, presented by Camille Combal. She stopped being a columnist for Il en pense quoi Camille? when the program became more focused on entertainment.

In 2017, she arrived at the TF1 Group on channel LCI, where she presented from Monday to Friday a column titled Carte blanche. In October 2020, she tried for one week presenting the evening news on the same channel. In early 2019, her column Carte blanche ended on LCI. In replacement, she participated at La Matinale on the same channel. Since September 2021, she became a co-host of La Matinale.

In September 2018, she began presenting the reportage program Appels d'urgence on TFX. In late 2020, she presents Rétroscopie on TMC, a program that imagines an interview of a celebrity in the future.

During the summer of 2021, she presented several episodes on prime time on TF1 of Le Grand Quiz, a program that quizzes the audience on several precise themes.

== Radio career ==
In August 2019, she debuted on radio on the station Europe 1, presenting from Monday to Friday in the morning Le Portrait inattendu, a column from the breakfast program Culture médias.

== Personal life ==
Hélène Mannarino has a brother and two sisters. Her brother works in physiotherapy, and her sisters are in education and human resources. Her father works with foster children and her mother Geneviève Mannarino is engaged in politics.

Her father was diagnosed with cancer, leading her engage herself at the Curie Institute.

== Television programs ==
=== Presenter and columnist ===
- 2014 : columnist for Le Lab.Ô on France Ô
- 2015 : columnist for Le Grand 8 on D8
- 2016 : colimnist for Il en pense quoi Camille ? on C8
- 2017–2019 : cultural columnist with Carte blanche on LCI
- 2018–present : presenter of Appels d'urgence on TFX
- 2019 : columnist for La Matinale on LCI
- 2020–present : presenter of Rétroscopie on TMC
- 2021 : presenter of Incroyables mariages gitans on TFX
- 2021 : presenter of Le Grand Quiz on TF1
- 2021–2022 : co-host with Stefan Etcheverry of La Matinale on LCI

=== Contestant ===
- 2018, 2019, 2020 and 2021 : Le Grand Concours des Animateurs on TF1 (4 participations)
