= Livi Sheldon =

British bodybuilder (born 1994)

Liv Sheldon
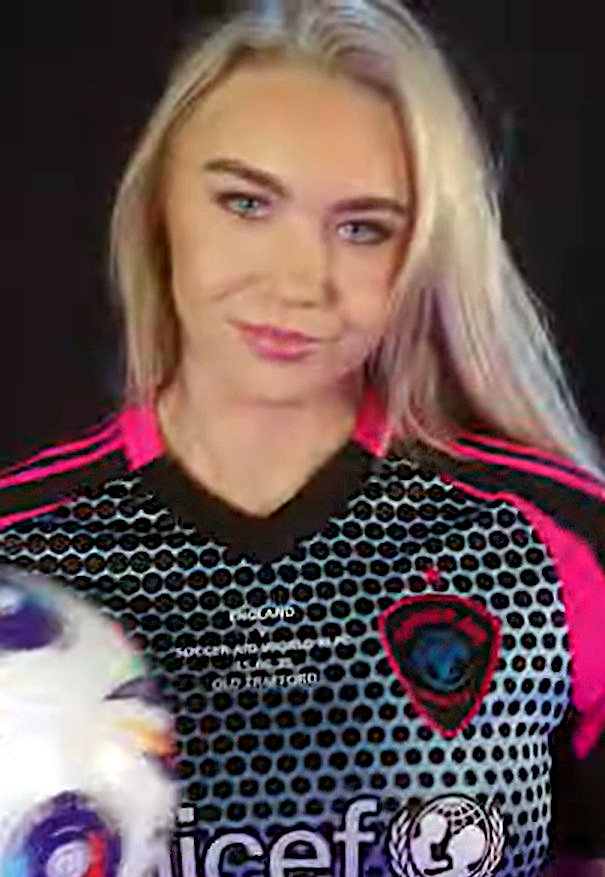
- Sheldon in Soccer Aid for Unicef 2025

Personal information
- Nicknames: Liv; LivFit; Diamond
- Nationality: English
- Born: Livi Sheldon; 18 May 1994 (age 32) Worcester, Worcestershire, England
- Education: Christopher Whitehead Language College; Worcester University
- Occupations: Bodybuilder; personal trainer; television personality
- Height: 6 ft (183 cm)
- Weight: 85 kg (187 lb)

Livi "Liv" Sheldon (born 18 May 1994) is an English television personality, personal trainer and former professional bodybuilder. She appears as Diamond on the BBC One's sports entertainment television game show Gladiators.

== Early life ==
From Worcestershire, Livi Sheldon attended Christopher Whitehead Language College. She graduated with a degree in Sports Science from Worcester University.

== Career ==
Sheldon was a keen footballer from a young age, and initially played on boys' teams before playing for – and captaining – Worcester City Ladies. She started weight training at 18 and bodybuilding at the age of 24. She was a finalist in the 'England Toned Figure' competition.

She made an appearance alongside Olympic sprinter Harry Aikines-Aryeetey, on BBC Breakfast on 19 May 2023, on which they were announced as new Gladiators on the re-booted show, with Sheldon taking the name 'Diamond'. Sheldon, who, at 6 ft is the tallest female Gladiator on the show, has spoken about her desire to use her appearances to inspire people to embrace their uniqueness, because she was bullied for her height at school. The show debuted on BBC One in January 2024. It was an immediate ratings success, becoming the channel's biggest entertainment launch since 2017. The success of the series has been credited in part to the popularity of new Gladiators like Sabre (Sheli McCoy), Fury (Jodie Ounsley), and Sheldon's Diamond. In April 2024, she confirmed she would be returning as Diamond for series two.

In March 2024, she was also confirmed as one of the celebrities to play in the televised charity football match Soccer Aid. Her other television appearances have included being a guest on The One Show.

While filming for the third season of Gladiators, the fan favourite Sheldon's Diamond suffered a major ACL tear, and had to undergo a surgery. Due to this, she had to miss most of the season.

== Personal life ==
Sheldon lives in Worcester with her fiancé Grant Gibbs. They both work as online personal trainers, with Sheldon running her own training app titled LivFitness.
