= Quang Luong =

Chinese actor, model and television personality

Personal information
- Nickname: Viper
- Nationality: British
- Born: Quang Thanh Luong; 1 March 1989 (age 37) China
- Home town: Leatherhead, Surrey, England
- Occupations: Actor; bodybuilder; fitness model
- Height: 6 ft (183 cm)
- Weight: 90 kg (200 lb)

Quang Thanh Luong (born 1 March 1989) is a Chinese-born British actor, fitness model and television personality, known for appearing as Viper on the British television endurance sports game show Gladiators.

== Life and career ==
Quang Thanh Luong, born in China and living in Leatherhead, Surrey, is an actor and fitness model. As an actor, he appeared in an episode of the Sky One sci-fi series Intergalactic as Diazo Chroma in 2021. The late martial arts superstar Bruce Lee has been the idol of his. As a model, he has appeared on drinks cans and book covers. Over a 15-year period, Luong dedicated his life to bodybuilding, and also boxes regularly.

In January 2024, Luong began appearing as "Viper" on the television endurance sports game show Gladiators. His character's personality is described as "mean, moody, sneaky and powerful", with Viper being perceived as the programme's villain, rarely speaking and regularly storming off set after facing defeat against the contenders. He has drawn comparisons to Wolf (Michael Van Wijk) from the original series of Gladiators, and he became the first gladiator in history to enter the referees' room. As Viper, Luong appeared in an April Fools Day skit for CBeebies in which he was jokingly introduced as a new presenter.

In July 2024, Luong was named as one of the cast members of Snow White at Lyceum Theatre, Sheffield in December 2024, playing a cameo role as "Henchman Viper".

== Filmography ==
Year	Title	Role	Ref.
2002	Die Another Day	Gangster (uncredited)	
2021	Intergalactic	Diazo Chroma	
2024–present	Gladiators	Viper	
2024	This Morning	Viper	
2024	Comic Relief	Viper	
2024	The Brothers Swap	Cobra	
