= Emily Steel (weightlifter) =

British weightlifter (born 2003)

Personal information
- Nickname: "Dynamite"
- Nationality: (England) English
- Born: 22 February 2003 (age 23) Hale, Trafford, Greater Manchester, England
- Education: Loughborough University (BSc)
- Occupations: Weightlifter; Elite CrossFit athlete; Television personality
- Height: 5 ft 5 in (165 cm)
- Weight: 64 kg (141 lb)

Sport
- Country: (United Kingdom) Great Britain
- Sport: Weightlifting
- Event: 64 kg

Achievements and titles
- Personal bests: Snatch: 71 kg (157 lb); Clean and jerk: 100 kg (220 lb); Total: 171 kg (377 lb)

Emily Steel (born 22 February 2003) is an English elite CrossFit athlete and weightlifter who broke the British U23 record in the clean and jerk in 2023. She also has the role "Dynamite" on British TV endurance sports game show Gladiators as well as being a country music singer.

== Early life and education ==
Born in 2003, Emily Steel grew up in the Altrincham and Hale areas of Greater Manchester. She was a competitive swimmer in her youth, and competed nationally. She attended Cheadle Hulme School. In 2020, she became the CrossFit European champion in her age category. Steel went on to study sport and exercise science at Loughborough University, graduating with a Bachelor of Science (BSc) in 2024.

== Career ==
As a weightlifter, she held the under-20 64 kg snatch record at the British age group weight lifting championships. Competing at the 2023 BUCS Weightlifting and Para Powerlifting Championships in Bangor in April 2023, Steel won gold and broke the British U23 record in the women's 64 kg clean and jerk, when she lifted 71 kg in the snatch and 100 kg in the clean and jerk, giving her a total of 171 kg.

Steel performs as Dynamite on the British TV endurance sports game show Gladiators shown on BBC One from January 2024. Her favourite events include Collision and Duel. At 23 years of age she is the youngest Gladiator competing on the re-booted series, and had not been born when the original British version of the show was broadcast.

== Personal life ==
At 5 ft 5 in tall, Steel is also a full-time CrossFit athlete. She has also released original songs like "Walking Away" and "Still Chasing You" on Spotify, Apple Music and YouTube platforms.
