= Jodie Ounsley =

England international rugby union player (born 2001)

- Born: Jodie Ounsley; 17 January 2001 (age 25) Dewsbury, West Yorkshire, England
- Height: 1.70 m (5 ft 7 in)
- Weight: 74 kg (163 lb)

Rugby union career
- Position: Wing
Senior career
Years	Team	Apps	(Points)
2018–2020	Loughborough Lightning		
2020–2022	Sale Sharks Women		
2022–2024	Exeter Chiefs Women		
International career
Years	Team	Apps	(Points)
2018	England U18s		
National sevens teams
Years	Team		Comps
2018	England U18s		
2019–2024	England		
2019	GB Women		

Jodie Ounsley (born 17 January 2001) is an English television personality, sports commentator, children's author, and former rugby union player. She has appeared as "Fury" in the BBC One show Gladiators since 2024 and has worked as an interviewer for Channel 4's coverage of the 2024 Paralympic Games in Paris.

She played rugby union for Premier 15s side Exeter Chiefs Women as a winger. In 2019 she became the first deaf female rugby player to play for a senior England side and the world's first-ever deaf female rugby sevens international. She is also a former British Brazilian jiu jitsu champion.

== Early life ==
From Dewsbury, West Yorkshire, Ounsley was born prematurely and needed medication which subsequently impacted her hearing and became profoundly deaf. She had a cochlear implant as a toddler, becoming the youngest person in the country to have the procedure. A high achiever in sports she was the junior world coal carrying champion on five occasions and won five sprint titles at the Deaf Athletics Championship, and won a gold medal at the British Open Brazilian jiu-jitsu finals.

She attended Shelley College where her sporting endeavours were initially frustrated by a knee injury known as Osgood Schlatter Disease. She began playing rugby in October 2015 and by May 2016 was top try scorer for her age group Sandal Girls RUFC team and was representing Yorkshire under-15s. She attended Loughborough College to study a degree in sports coaching.

== Rugby union career ==
Ounsley plays rugby with a scrum cap which protects her cochlear implant. In 2018 Ounsley won the young Deaf Sports Personality award, following a year in which she scored for Yorkshire in the County Championship final held at Twickenham Stadium, represented England U18s against Wales U18s at the Principality Stadium, and signed for Premier 15s side Loughborough Lightning as well as being part of a winning World Deaf Rugby Sevens Championship side. In 2019 she earned her first senior England rugby sevens cap having previously played for the 15's and 7's England team at Under 18's level. In doing so she became the world's first-ever deaf female rugby sevens player to be selected for a full international and the first deaf female rugby player to play for a senior England side. Awarded a full-time England 7s contract she made her World Sevens Series debut in Glendale, Colorado, US and scored her first try in the event in Cape Town, South Africa, in December 2019.

In February 2020 Ounsley was included in the GB Women rugby sevens provisional squad for the 2020 Summer Olympics. She won the Deaf Sports Personality of the Year 2020 award. In July 2020 Ounsley joined Premier 15s side Sale Sharks Women. In 2022 she signed for Exeter Chiefs Women. She injured her shoulder in the first game of the 2023-24 Allianz Cup and missed seven months of the season but returned to the Exeter side in April 2024 at the competition's semi-final stage for their match against Saracens Women.

In April 2024, Ounsley reportedly was leaving rugby sevens, due to the injury, and her will to "pursue new opportunities".

== Media career ==
=== Gladiators ===
In May 2023, Ounsley was named as ‘Fury’, one of the new Gladiators in a reboot of the television series of the same name to be broadcast on BBC One from 2024. Both the female finalists of the first rebooted series named Fury as the toughest opponent they faced. Given her "veteran" status in the rugby fields, her favourite events on the show include Powerball, The Ring and The Edge; these are the more head-to-head and combat-based events. The success of the series has been credited in part to the popularity of new Gladiators like Sabre, Diamond and Fury.

=== Other projects ===
In August 2024, she was a member of the Channel 4 team covering the 2024 Paralympic Games in Paris. In December 2024, she was an award presenter at the BBC Sports Personality of the Year. The following year, Ounsley was a celebrity contestant on Celebrity MasterChef and the Strictly Come Dancing Christmas Special 2025.

In September 2024, Ounsley signed a two-book deal with the publisher Macmillian Children’s Books. Her book Keep Smashing It: Be Strong, Be Brave, Be Confident written with Becky Grey and illustrated by Dane Thibeault was nominated for Children’s Sports Book of the Year at the 2026 Sports Book Awards. Ounsley voiced a character for the Peppa Pig episode "Hearing Test", where Peppa's younger brother George gets diagnosed with moderate hearing loss and requires a hearing aid, with Ounsley voicing the audiologist in the storyline.

== Personal life ==
Her father Phil was a former professional mixed martial artist and took part in the 2008 Gladiators reboot on Sky One. Her younger brother also played rugby. Ounsley is an ambassador for The Elizabeth Foundation charity, a pre-school nursery for deaf children. In 2021, Ounsley launched Not Just Anyone (NJA), a storytelling platform designed to inspire younger generations. In 2023, she was named on the Woman's Hour Power List 2023: Women in Sport. Her father competed at the World Coal Carrying Championships, and she won the children's race five times at the event. In 2025, she set a new Guinness World Record in Wakefield, running 50 metres (160 ft) while carrying a bag of coal in 8.06 seconds.

On 1 December 2025, Ounsley announced that her father had died suddenly while out walking.
