= Jamie Bigg =

British bodybuilder and television personality (born 1985)

Personal information
- Nickname: "The Giant"
- Born: Jamie Bigg
- Occupations: Bodybuilder; television personality; fitness coach
- Height: 6 ft 5 in (1.96 m)
- Weight: 287 lb (130 kg)

Jamie Bigg is an English former bodybuilder, firefighter and former television personality, known for appearing as "Giant" on the British TV endurance sports game show Gladiators. He was the world's tallest professional bodybuilder.

== Life and career ==
At the age of four, Bigg's surname was changed to Johal after his mother got married. He reverted to Bigg in 2026. Prior to working as a bodybuilder with an attempt at becoming an influencer via an online fitness coach persona, he claims to have been a firefighter. During his bodybuilding career, Bigg was described as one of the tallest professional bodybuilder, and earned a nickname "The Giant" for standing at 6 feet 5 inches (1.96 m) and weighing over 20 stone (280 lb; 130 kg).

Bigg used to eat around 10,000 calories a day to maintain his physique. He is employed at Ilkeston Gym and Fitness. In January 2024, he began appearing as "Giant" on British TV endurance sports game show Gladiators. His strongest event on the show is Duel. During his time on the show, Bigg was criticised for previously promoting the use of anabolic steroids, despite their being Class C drugs. In response, Bigg said he stopped using steroids in around October 2022 and no longer advocates their use. On 24 April 2026, he announced that he wouldn't be returning for the fourth series of Gladiators, claiming he had been "axed" after planning to go public about his relationship with OnlyFans creator, Taylor Ryan.

In 2024 Bigg appeared as Giant alongside fellow Gladiator Steel (Zack George) at Sheffield railway station, a stunt to promote the rebooted game show.

In 2024 Bigg, made his pantomime debut at Grand Theatre, Wolverhampton, in Beauty and the Beast from 30 November to 5 January. His 2025/26 panto season was in Jack & the Beanstalk at the Winding Wheel in Chesterfield.

When he got married, Bigg changed his name to the double-barrelled "Christian-Johal". In December 2025, he confirmed his divorce. He also said he would be reverting to using his birth surname, Bigg.

== Filmography ==
Year	Title	Role	Ref.
2023	Strictly Come Dancing	Terms and conditions reader	
2024–2026	Gladiators	as Giant	
