= Matty Campbell =

British bodybuilder and television personality

Personal information
- Nicknames: "Bionic" "The Mountain"
- Born: 28 November 1995 (age 30) Middlesbrough, North Yorkshire, England
- Occupations: Bodybuilder; television personality
- Height: 6 ft 6 in (1.98 m)
- Weight: 260 lb (120 kg)

Matty Campbell (born 28 November 1995) is an English bodybuilder, former sprinter, footballer and television personality, known for appearing as "Bionic" on the British television endurance sports game show Gladiators.

== Life and career ==
Matty Campbell was born in Middlesbrough, North Yorkshire on 28 November 1995.

When he was a child, Campbell used to sprint and play football, reaching academy level with the latter, until he was involved in a car accident as a teenager. Upon his rehabilitation, he began attending the gym and after discovering his natural ability to gain muscle, he subsequently started bodybuilding. Since then, he has also competed in professional level, and is known among peers as "The Mountain", due to his formidable frame. During his bodybuilding prime, Campbell weighed around 307 pounds (139 kg).

In January 2024, Campbell, at 6 feet 6 inches (1.98 m) tall began appearing as "Bionic" on the television endurance sports game show Gladiators. Upon joining the show, Campbell said "Never in a million years did [he] expect to get the call to be a Gladiator", adding that "it's a feeling that'll never sink in [...] the training and hard work has finally paid off for me, I can't wait to get started!".

Across the filming of Gladiators, Campbell's Bionic has suffered several injuries ranging from arm- to leg injuries. While filming for series 3, he suffered a shoulder dislocation, and due to having to undergo surgery, he missed out on most of the series.

== Filmography ==
Year	Title	Role	Ref.
2024–present	Gladiators	"Bionic"	
2024	Saturday Mash-Up!	"Bionic"	
2024	Comic Relief	"Bionic"	
2024	The Weakest Link	"Bionic"	
