= Karenjeet Kaur Bains =

British powerlifter

Karenjeet Bains
Personal information
- Nicknames: Bullet Bains; Athena
- Nationality: British
- Born: Karenjeet Kaur Bains; 23 July 1996 (age 29) Warwick, Warwickshire, England
- Home town: Warwick, Warwickshire, England
- Education: Myton School; Durham University
- Height: 5 ft 4 in (163 cm)
- Weight: 67 kg (148 lb)

Sport
- Country: (United Kingdom) Great Britain
- Sport: Powerlifting

Karenjeet Kaur Bains (born 23 July 1996) is a British powerlifter, former track and field athlete and television personality known for appearing on the television show Gladiators as "Athena". She has won the Commonwealth Powerlifting Championships junior title and became the first British Sikh woman to represent her country at both the European and World championships.

== Early life ==
Karenjeet Kaur Bains was born 23 July 1996 in Warwickshire, England, to Sikh parents from Punjab, India. Her mother came from a family of wrestlers and her father was a former bodybuilder and powerlifter. She attended Myton School, where she was a champion track and field athlete, racing in the 100 metres, 200 metres and 300 metres, and Hammer throw. She earned the nickname "Bullet Bains" at school due to her speed. Her older twin brothers were also athletes, competing nationally in the 400 metres hurdles.

Bains started to train with weights in order to increase her sprinting power, then found she enjoyed powerlifting in its own right. She used the gym at her family home and her father coached her in the exercises of squat, bench press and deadlift; after three months of training, she won her first competition. She attended Durham University, where she gained a degree in accounting. She then worked in audit at KPMG.

== Career ==
Whilst at university, Bains took the British and English powerlifting titles and won the British Universities powerlifting in the junior women's 63 kg category. At the age of 19, she injured her piriformis muscle in her left buttock and it took two years to recover her strength. She then won the Commonwealth Powerlifting Championships junior title and became the first British Sikh woman to represent her country at both the European and World championships. Her first senior event was at the World Classic Bench Press Championships in Vilnius, Lithuania and she came sixth. After six years working for KPMG, Bains switched to working for a small arts company in 2022 and also put her name to an online training app.

In 2024, Bains began to appear on the television show Gladiators as Athena. Despite being only 5 ft 4 in tall, one of the all-time shortest Gladiators, she has been training up to 6 times a week, to maintain her physique for the show. In 2024, she appeared on the quiz show The Weakest Link alongside fellow Gladiators.

She was the featured in an episode of the second series of the BBC TV series Extraordinary Portraits, where her portrait was painted by Amar Stewart.

A major surgery following from a leg injury put Bains' Athena off air from the third season of Gladiators.
