= ClubCall =

British football information website and previously phone line

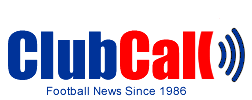
- Website type: Sports News
- Owner: ICS Ltd
- Revenue: Advertising
- Website: https://www.clubcall.com/
- Registration: Optional
- Launched: 1986
- Current status: online

ClubCall is a British football information service, which was started as a telephone publishing business in 1986. It has since become a sports website and international mobile content provider.

== History ==
ClubCall was launched as a club-by-club telephone information service by BT Supercall (1983–87), the UK's first audiotext business set up by Kieran Levis following deregulation of the telecoms industry, which for the first time allowed fans to listen to a telephone news service dedicated to their team.

Leading clubs in the then First Division (Manchester United, Manchester City, Arsenal, Chelsea, Everton, Sheffield Wednesday and Liverpool) were among the first raft of teams signed up on a revenue share basis, whereby they received a percentage of income from the calls to their official information line which quickly proved popular among fans who could hear club news, interviews and commentary on the telephone by ringing an 0898 prefixed number. The success of the new service saw ClubCall expand to cover 72 teams in England and Scotland as clubs scrambled to be part of a new and significant revenue stream.

Local reporters, dedicated to a particular club, provided an at the ground news gathering service, which was fed back to ClubCall's headquarters at Downham Road, Dalston, London where it was updated by a team of editors. One of the first appointed editors was radio reporter Ian Holding, one of the current owners of the ClubCall business.

In 1991, BT sold ClubCall to bookmaker Ladbrokes at a time when the premium rate telephone market was flourishing. Ladbrokes saw it as an opportunity to develop relationships with football clubs and to associate its brand with football which was becoming an increasingly important betting medium. The company operated ClubCall at a time when interest in football was heightened by the formation of the Premier League in 1992.

By 1999 ClubCall was in the hands of Scottish Telecom, later Thus plc, who wanted additional call minutes for its network.

Under long-serving Managing Editor Eamonn Watson, ClubCall extended its coverage to all major football tournaments in 14 countries and uniquely offered, at that time, the only match commentary service for supporters of many teams.

However, by the turn of the millennium, many premium rate information services were in a period of decline as the popularity of the internet began to take hold. In 2001, Glasgow-based Thus plc wanted to focus on building sales of phone and internet services to the corporate sector and sold ClubCall and its other consumer brands (RaceCall and WeatherCall) to mobile media firm iTouch as part of a £3.5 million disposal.

iTouch took a conscious decision not to cannibalise the ClubCall telephone customer base and offered a minimal web presence. In contrast, competitor Teamtalk (launched as an independent telephone service in 1992 by ex ClubCall editor Ian Holding) was attracting a huge internet audience and was listed on the London Stock Exchange in April 2000 at the height of the tech-stock boom.

iTouch changed its emphasis in 2004 and began tapping into its reporter base to create a web version of stories. In 2008 the ClubCall and RaceCall telephony and web services were sold to Independent Content Services Ltd, owned by Holding, as a service for mobile and the web in addition to telephone.

The telephone and mobile publishing is now promoted via networks, bookmakers and media partners such as The Daily Telegraph and The Guardian Newspapers.
