= Gladiators (franchise) =

Sports entertainment television show

- Created by: Dan Carr and John C. Ferraro
- Original work: American Gladiators
- Owner: MGM Television
- Years: 1989–present

Films and television
- Television series: Gladiators (see international versions)

Games
- Video game: American Gladiators (1991)

Miscellaneous
- Genre: Sports entertainment
- First aired: 9 September 1989; 37 years ago

Gladiators is a sports entertainment television show that was first broadcast in the United States and was an international success during the 1990s and early 2000s.

The concept of the show is that athletic members of the public battle against the show's own Gladiators (often semi-professional or ex-athletes) to claim points in several events that require speed, strength and skill. In the final event of the show, "The Eliminator" the contenders race against each other (with starting times based on previous events), with the first to finish winning the episode and moving onto the next round.

Versions of the show were filmed for local broadcasters in the United Kingdom, Finland, Japan, Australia, South Africa, Sweden, Nigeria, and Denmark. Selected athletes from Russia, Germany, Netherlands, South Korea and The Bahamas would also compete in international shows during the series' original run, despite the fact that they did not have their own domestic series.

After a lengthy break, Gladiators was revived in 2008 in the United Kingdom, the United States and Australia; in 2009 Lebanon created their own series featuring competitors from all over the Arab region and in 2012 Sweden brought back their version which proved most successful of all the first revivals, with another revival airing in Finland during 2017 and 2019. A further British revival began airing in 2024 and was followed by a second Australian revival; later that year a French version was launched for the first time, however both of the latter versions were poorly received and attracted low ratings. Both versions were swiftly cancelled as a result. In May 2025, a Russian version of the show debuted. Later an American reboot went into production mid-2025 for an early 2026 debut, and, after thirty years since last competing in the international editions, Germany announced it would produce their own debut domestic series.

A children's derivative of the concept was also made in the United States, called Gladiators 2000 (a.k.a. G2) (1994–1996). A British variant of this was aired starting in 1995, called Gladiators: Train 2 Win. A one-off, celebrity derivative primetime special in the United States, called Superstar American Gladiators aired on ABC on May 4, 1995.

== History ==
=== 1990s success ===
The initial concept for the show by Dan Carr and John C. Ferraro was held in Erie, Pennsylvania, in the USA before being sold to Samuel Goldwyn Productions/MGM where the format was adapted and televised as American Gladiators with the first series airing over 1989–90. As the show progressed, new events were introduced along with new Gladiators, sometimes retiring previous Gladiators.

Following the success of American Gladiators, other countries began to produce their own versions of the show with the UK and Finland starting production in 1992. American Gladiators had already picked up a cult following in the UK after being shown on late night TV. The UK, most noticeably adapted the concept into a large arena (the National Indoor Arena in Birmingham), glamorising the show, often adapting events from the American series as well as introducing many of their own, often more high-tech. Winners from the UK and Finnish series would then go over to America, to film a special show of American Gladiators in which they competed against the current American champions along with selected athletes from other territories such as Japan and the Bahamas and South Korea.

In early 1995, the first full scale international competition was launched in which selected Gladiators from the American, Finnish and British series competed against contender champions from those three countries. A fourth country, Russia was added but as they did not have their own domestic series, the Gladiators and contenders were hand-picked by Russian TV producers. The Finnish series ceased production after International Gladiators 1.

In 1995, Australia began production of their own show, basing it on the British series. After the first series, a three part 'Ashes' mini-series was filmed in Australia, in which a selection of British and Australian Gladiators faced champions from the opposing countries. Australia then went on to compete in International Gladiators 2 along with the UK and the US. Russia also returned, even though they still did not have a domestic series. Germany and South Africa also competed even though they too did not have their own domestic series.

=== Decline ===
After International Gladiators 2, the American Gladiators series ceased production due to falling ratings, although a live dinner show ran in Florida between 1996 and 1998. The United Kingdom and Australia continued to produce their own editions of the show, with the UK continuing to add new events to its roster (retiring some due to safety reasons) with Australia adding events from the British series in its second and third series.

In 1996, the United Kingdom and Australia faced each other again in 'the Ashes 2' this time held in the UK Gladiator arena and an Australia vs. Russia mini-series was filmed in Australia with two of the Russian Gladiators who had appeared in International Gladiators 2 appearing alongside new faces. After both of the mini-series were filmed and aired, the Australian show was cancelled due to falling ratings, even though plans for a fourth domestic series had commenced, which would include a brand-new event that would be exclusive to Australia. A third series of International Gladiators was planned to be filmed in Australia, but this was cancelled after ITV and LWT refused to finance another series. A third Ashes series was also planned for 1997, but this was also cancelled by the time the UK's sixth domestic series aired.

In 1997, South Africa competed against the UK in the Springbok Challenge held in the UK Gladiator arena, despite the fact that they did not have their own domestic series. Only one of the South African Gladiators who appeared in International Gladiators 2 appeared.

In 1998, there were plans for the show to have a massive overhaul, but this was cancelled after it was announced that the British series was to be axed due to falling ratings. A final mini-series in which past champions competed was filmed instead. It was at this time that South Africa finally began production of their own series and in 2000, a team of UK Gladiators and contenders went over to film the Springbok Challenge 2, a series filmed exclusively for South African TV only.

=== New millennium ===
With the South African production in full swing, other territories began producing their own versions. Sweden began producing their own version in 2000 under the name Gladiatorerna, with the old UK apparatus being shipped over. Before TV4 started producing its own seasons, the American version was broadcast in the 1990s with Swedish commentators. Short lived series in Nigeria (2002) and Denmark (2003) followed.

In 2001, the South African series was overhauled, but it proved unpopular with viewers and the show was axed. Sweden continued to produce Gladiators, creating an event unique to the series, Spidercage, before being axed in 2004.

=== The revival ===
In August 2007, NBC confirmed that a revival of American Gladiators would be produced by Reveille Productions and MGM Television to air mid-season during early 2008. In addition to events from the original show, the series drew elements from the 1990s British series as well as being updated for the new millennium in which several events would be played over water. The UK also produced a revival of Gladiators. In September 2007, the Seven Network in Australia announced that it too was reviving Gladiators, although unlike the American revival, the Australian revival was to follow the lines of its predecessor rather than be overhauled.

The first episode of the new American Gladiators premiered on Sunday 6 January 2008 proving to be a ratings hit. A second season was instantly commissioned. At the same time, it was announced that Sky One were commissioning a British revival which would follow the basis set by the American revival.

The Australian revival premiered on 30 March 2008 with the British series starting on Sunday 11 May. Both revivals proved instant ratings hits for their respective channels. On 12 May 2008, the second season of the American show began, with the series being moved to a bigger arena.

Due to low ratings, the Seven Network placed filming for a second series on hold and released the Gladiators from their holding contracts. NBC similarly have yet to commission a third series due to ratings for the second series being lower than expected.

The British revival first aired in August 2008, a second series aired in January 2009. On 20 May 2009, the British series was axed by the new controller for Sky 1, Stuart Murphy.

The Arab World launched its own version in 2009 featuring contenders and Gladiators from all over the Arab region. It only lasted one season.

Between 2012 and 2017, the Swedish version, known as Gladiatorerna, made a return to television and the revived show proved to be successful and is the longest lasting revival of the franchise.

=== Potential revivals ===
In July 2014, Arthur A. Smith company announced plans to bring American Gladiators back again for the third time and were shopping the idea to networks to give it a home, this version would have incorporated elements that were inspired by films such as The Hunger Games along with mixed martial arts.

In August 2018, actor Seth Rogen and Evan Goldberg announced plans to bring American Gladiators back again for the fourth time and are shopping the idea to distributors who are interested in the revival.

In August 2019, former UK gladiator Wolf said in a Lorraine interview, he has been begging TV producers to bring back the UK version of the show for a third time. Davina McCall expressed an interest to host the show later that month.

In September 2021, it was reported that MGM Television has teaming up with WWE for a reboot of American Gladiators that will featuring WWE wrestlers. The project is currently being pitched to broadcasters and streaming platforms.

=== Second official revivals ===
In July 2022, Metro reported that BBC One were in talks to bring back the British version. Filming was rumoured to take place in Sheffield Arena early next year. The revival was confirmed by the BBC on 25 August 2022.

In July 2023, following the BBC’s revival of the British version, the Australian version of the show was confirmed to return for the second time and is set to be revived by Warner Bros. Television Studios. The revival was cancelled after only one season as it "didn’t resonate with audiences".

In May 2024, Amazon Prime announced that they had ordered a reboot of American Gladiators and a casting call was sent out in June 2024. Later that month, it was confirmed that the format had been sold to French broadcaster TF1 and would be produced by ITV Studios France. The French version was filmed in Aren'Ice, a multi-purpose arena that is primarily used as an ice rink, located in Cergy. The Amazon Prime reboot would announce in May 2025 that WWE Superstar Mike "The Miz" Mizanin would host.

In March 2025, Russian TV station NTV and production company WeiT Media began filming the debut series for Russia, known as Гладиаторы.

== Format ==
In a standard show, two female and two male contenders face each other and the Gladiators in anywhere from four to seven events. The line up of events differs across each show with different Gladiators playing the different events dependent on their skill type. Towards the end of the initial UK and American series, the male and female contenders did not necessarily play the same events. Contenders score points for winning against the Gladiators, with the winner having a time advantage in the last event the contenders compete in, the Eliminator.

The winner of the Eliminator goes through to the next round (or wins the series) unless a qualifying time is needed for the next round.

Shows are usually presented by a male and female host (with the exception of all but two seasons of the original American Gladiators, which were presented by two male hosts), as well as a main referee (often wearing a striped black and white shirt, in the style of an American football referee) presiding over events, handing out disqualifications or red and yellow cards to contenders or Gladiators if needed. A timekeeper is often present behind the referee but these are not always referred to or provide a speaking role. An unseen commentator will provide play by play accounts (again with the exception of the original American series, where the on-screen hosts also provided the play by play)

The show is filmed in front of a live studio audience made up of fans and supporters of the contenders. It is not uncommon for the cameras to focus on particular crowd members or banners. Some incarnations of the show such as the Australian and original UK series have cheerleaders to provide background entertainment.

== Events ==
There have been 35 events involving Gladiators (as well as the Eliminator) across the incarnations. Four of the events have an alternate name in certain territories. A different selection of the events will be played in each episode. No single territory has had all thirty five events on its roster. The UK had the biggest number of events during its initial run with twenty three events.

All events were created by either the American or British series with the exception of "Soccer Shootout" (South Africa) and "Spidercage" (Sweden). The UK notably adapted some of the American events, with the adaptations becoming the standard design for the concept. For example, the UK version of "Skytrack" would later be adopted by the Australian and American revival series whereas the UK concept of the American event "Tug-o-War" known as "Tilt" eventually superseded Tug-o-War for the 2008 American revival.

Over the course of the original UK and American series, several events were dropped, often due to safety reasons. The Eliminator was the only event which was played in every episode across every territory.

== The Gladiators ==
There have been more than 400 Gladiators across all participating territories. Inevitably, there has been some repeat usage of names, and there have been seven instances where the same name has been used twice in a territory for a televised series. The original American Gladiators had two different Gladiators named Lace, and the names Siren and Titan have been used in both the original and revival formats of the American show. The names Amazon, Panther, Siren and Warrior have been used for both the original and revived UK shows. The name Valkyria was used both in the original and revived series in Sweden. The names Panther, Ice, Scorpio/Scorpion, Tornado, Lightning, Blade, Cyclone, Fierce/Féroce/Hurja, Flash, Force, Shadow, Ninja, Thunder, Viper, Nitro, Tiger/Tiikeri, Terminator, Cobra, Rebel, Hurricane, Laser, Phoenix, Destroyer, Rocket, Dynamite, Sabre, Bullit/Bullet, Delta and Steel have been used for both male and female Gladiators.

Most Gladiators come from either a bodybuilding or athletic background. Nine Olympic athletes have competed as Gladiators: Amazon (Sharron Davies) (UK), Nightshade (Judy Simpson) (UK), Rebel (Jennifer Stoute) (UK), Olympia (Tatiana Grigorieva) (first Australian revival), Hurricane (Breaux Greer) (US revival), Predator (Du'aine Ladejo) (first UK revival), Battleaxe (Shirley Webb) (first UK revival), Phantom (Toby Olubi) (second UK revival) and Fire (Montell Douglas) (second UK revival).

There have been a few instances where contenders have become Gladiators. Minna Ryynänen, a quarter-finalist from the first series of Finnish Gladiators returned as Gladiator Safiiri for the next series. UK season 3 and International Gladiators 1 champion Eunice Huthart became Gladiator Blaze. However, Eunice only competed as Blaze in non televised live shows, opting to perform as herself in future televised episodes. Australian series 2 champion and International Gladiators 2 runner-up Lourene Bevaart became Glacier, American Gladiators 2008 series 1 champions Monica Carlson and Evan Dollard becoming Jet and Rocket respectively (this was actually mentioned as part of the "prize package" for this season) and after a seven-year gap, Gladiatorerna season 5 winner Patrick Lessa joined the Swedish team for the 2012 revival as Gladiator Baron Samedi, series 4 Gladiaattorit champion Janica Timonen joined the 5th series as Siren (Seireeni).

Only two Gladiators have played for two different domestic series in differing countries; Vulcan (John Seru) who was originally an Australian Gladiator who transferred to the UK team for Season 7 upon the end of the Australian series and Fox (Tammy Baker) who transferred from the UK to the South African team when the UK series finished. Laser (Tina Andrew), a UK Gladiator went on to compete as Sheena, a member of a South African team for the Springbok Challenge 1. However, she did not compete in the domestic South African series.

Some Gladiators have died since their Gladiator careers ended, including Siren, Havoc, Hawk, Rage, Atlas, Thunder, Gold, and Storm from the original American Gladiators, Dynamite and Spartak from Russia, Zeke and Indra from Sweden, Sahara, Samson and Scorpion from South Africa, Ninja from Japan, Viking and Timantti from Finland, Sapphire from Nigeria, and Falcon and Gold from the United Kingdom.

== International versions ==
Country	Show name	Host(s)	TV station	Premiere	Finale
Arab League	المصارعون; Almusarieun	Zeina Khoury	LBC	2009	2009
Arab League	المصارعون; Almusarieun	Nasser Abu Lafi	LBC	2009	2009
Australia	Gladiators	Kimberley Joseph	Seven Network	29 April 1995	12 October 1996
Australia	Gladiators	Aaron Pedersen	Seven Network	29 April 1995	12 October 1996
Australia	Gladiators	Mike Hammond	Seven Network	29 April 1995	12 October 1996
Australia	Gladiators	Tom Williams	Seven Network	30 March 2008	6 July 2008
Australia	Gladiators	Zoe Naylor	Seven Network	30 March 2008	6 July 2008
Australia	Gladiators	Beau Ryan	Network 10	15 January 2024	28 January 2024
Australia	Gladiators	Liz Ellis	Network 10	15 January 2024	28 January 2024
Denmark	Gladiatorerne	Lotte Thor-Jensen	TV3	2003	2003
Denmark	Gladiatorerne	Jakob Kjeldbjerg	TV3	2003	2003
Finland	Gladiaattorit	Juha-Pekka 'JP' Jalo	MTV3	6 January 1993	11 May 1994
Finland	Gladiaattorit	Katariina Ebeling	MTV3	6 January 1993	11 May 1994
Finland	Gladiaattorit	Minna Aaltonen	MTV3	6 January 1993	11 May 1994
Finland	Gladiaattorit	Heikki Paasonen	Nelonen	23 September 2017	16 December 2017
Finland	Gladiaattorit	Viivi Pumpanen	MTV3	21 April 2019	16 June 2019
France	Gladiators : Qui osera les défier ?	Denis Brogniart	TF1	27 December 2024	17 January 2025
France	Gladiators : Qui osera les défier ?	Hélène Mannarino	TF1	27 December 2024	17 January 2025
France	Gladiators : Qui osera les défier ?	Jean-Pierre Foucault	TF1	27 December 2024	17 January 2025
Germany	Gladiators – Die Show der Giganten	Frank Buschmann	Amazon Prime Video; RTL	6 August 2026 (Amazon Prime); 4 September 2026 (RTL)	TBA 2026 (Amazon Prime); 2 October 2026 (RTL)
Germany	Gladiators – Die Show der Giganten	Laura Wontorra	Amazon Prime Video; RTL	6 August 2026 (Amazon Prime); 4 September 2026 (RTL)	TBA 2026 (Amazon Prime); 2 October 2026 (RTL)
Germany	Gladiators – Die Show der Giganten	Jan Köppen	Amazon Prime Video; RTL	6 August 2026 (Amazon Prime); 4 September 2026 (RTL)	TBA 2026 (Amazon Prime); 2 October 2026 (RTL)
Japan	Bang! Bang! Bang!	George Tokoro	Fuji Television	January 1996	September 1996
Japan	Bang! Bang! Bang!	Silvia Tomoko Hane	Fuji Television	January 1996	September 1996
Nigeria	MTN Gladiators	Ken Cyril Nta	M-Net Africa	2002	2002
Nigeria	MTN Gladiators	Rich Cyril Nta	M-Net Africa	2002	2002
Russia	Гладиаторы; Gladiatoriy	Nikita Panfilov	NTV	11 May 2025	28 June 2025
Russia	Гладиаторы; Gladiatoriy	Kirill Kosharin	NTV	11 May 2025	28 June 2025
South Africa	MTN Gladiators	Ursula Chikane	SABC3	1999	2002
South Africa	MTN Gladiators	Glenn Hicks	SABC3	1999	2002
South Africa	MTN Gladiators	James Lennox	SABC3	1999	2002
Sweden	Gladiatorerna	Gunde Svan	TV4	31 March 2000	2 April 2004
Sweden	Gladiatorerna	Agneta Sjödin	TV4	31 March 2000	2 April 2004
Sweden	Gladiatorerna	Gry Forssell	TV4	7 January 2012	27 January 2018
Sweden	Gladiatorerna	Anders Timell	TV4	7 January 2012	27 January 2018
United Kingdom	Gladiators	Ulrika Jonsson	ITV	10 October 1992	1 January 2000
United Kingdom	Gladiators	John Fashanu	ITV	10 October 1992	1 January 2000
United Kingdom	Gladiators	Jeremy Guscott	ITV	10 October 1992	1 January 2000
United Kingdom	Gladiators	Ian Wright	Sky One	11 May 2008	25 October 2009
United Kingdom	Gladiators	Kirsty Gallacher	Sky One	11 May 2008	25 October 2009
United Kingdom	Gladiators	Caroline Flack	Sky One	11 May 2008	25 October 2009
United Kingdom	Gladiators	Bradley Walsh	BBC One	13 January 2024	
United Kingdom	Gladiators	Barney Walsh	BBC One	13 January 2024	
United States	American Gladiators	Mike Adamle	Syndication	9 September 1989	11 May 1996
United States	American Gladiators	Joe Theismann	Syndication	9 September 1989	11 May 1996
United States	American Gladiators	Todd Christensen	Syndication	9 September 1989	11 May 1996
United States	American Gladiators	Larry Csonka	Syndication	9 September 1989	11 May 1996
United States	American Gladiators	Lisa Malosky	Syndication	9 September 1989	11 May 1996
United States	American Gladiators	Danny Lee Clark	Syndication	9 September 1989	11 May 1996
United States	American Gladiators	Hulk Hogan	NBC; Telemundo	6 January 2008	4 August 2008
United States	American Gladiators	Laila Ali	NBC; Telemundo	6 January 2008	4 August 2008
United States	American Gladiators	Mike Mizanin	Amazon Prime Video	17 April 2026	

A number of versions were cancelled in the pre-production stage: these are France's Gladiateur (Gladiator) in 1993, Spain's Gladiadors in 1994, Poland's Gladiatorzy (Gladius) in 1999, the Italian Gladiatore in 2008, and the Turkish version Gladyiators in 2009.

Zodiac TV, who worked alongside TV4 and MTV Produktion to produce Gladiatorerna and Gladiatorerne in the early 2000s, also started to create series in Russia, Germany, and Benelux (Netherlands, Belgium and Luxembourg), but they never materialised.

=== International series and specials ===
Show name	Year	Participants	Episodes	Location
International Challenge of Champions	1993	USA, Nigeria, Netherlands, UK, Germany, Japan and South Korea	1	United States
International Challenge of Champions	1994	USA, Japan, UK, Finland and The Bahamas	1	United States
International Gladiators 1	1994	UK, USA, Russia and Finland	7	United Kingdom
International Gladiators 2	1995	UK, USA, Russia, Australia, Germany and South Africa	7	United Kingdom
International Gladiators 3 (Note: The UK had held the previous 2 international series at considerable cost to broadcaster ITV and production company LWT, who both refused to finance another series. The show was due to be filmed in Australia but with the end of the Australian domestic series, this series was cancelled as no other country agreed to host it.)	1996	Australia, UK, USA, Germany and Russia (Note: Also interested in competing were New Zealand, South Korea, Japan, South Africa and a joint Scandinavian team consisting of Sweden, Finland and Norway.)	Unknown	Australia
Gladiators: Battle of the Champions	1995	UK, USA and Australia	1	United Kingdom
Gladiators: The Ashes 1	1995	UK vs Australia	3	Australia
Gladiators: The Ashes 2	1996	UK vs Australia	3	United Kingdom
Gladiators: Australia vs Russia	1996	Australia vs Russia	3	Australia
Gladiators: Springbok Challenge 1	1997	South Africa vs UK	3	United Kingdom
Gladiators: Springbok Challenge 2 (Note: This series has never been broadcast in the UK.)	2000	South Africa vs UK	11	South Africa

=== Spin-offs ===
Country	Name	Host(s)	TV station	Premiere	Finale
United Kingdom	Gladiators: Train 2 Win	Sharron Davies	ITV	2 September 1995	13 March 1998
United Kingdom	Gladiators: Train 2 Win	Daley Thompson	ITV	2 September 1995	13 March 1998
United Kingdom	Gladiators: Train 2 Win	Various Gladiators on rotation	ITV	2 September 1995	13 March 1998
United Kingdom	Gladiators: Train 2 Win	Margherita Taylor	ITV	2 September 1995	13 March 1998
United Kingdom	Gladiators: Train 2 Win	Kyran Bracken	ITV	2 September 1995	13 March 1998
United Kingdom	Gladiators: Train 2 Win	Lee Sharpe	ITV	2 September 1995	13 March 1998
United Kingdom	Gladiators: Epic Pranks	Harry Aikines-Aryeetey (as Nitro)	CBBC	15 February 2025	
United States	Gladiators 2000	Ryan Seacrest	Syndication	17 September 1994	11 May 1996
United States	Gladiators 2000	Maria Sansone	Syndication	17 September 1994	11 May 1996
United States	Gladiators 2000	Valarie Rae Miller	Syndication	17 September 1994	11 May 1996
United States	Superstar American Gladiators	Pat O'Brien	ABC	4 May 1995	
United States	Superstar American Gladiators	Kim Alexis Duguay	ABC	4 May 1995	

== Other ventures ==
=== 30 for 30 ===
On April 12, 2021; it was announced by Vice Studios & ESPN Films that a documentary about American Gladiators has been set for an upcoming episode of the ESPN series 30 for 30 helmed by Ben Berman. The two part episodes aired on May 30 & May 31, 2023.

=== Muscles & Mayhem ===
On June 28, 2023; a limited five-part documentary series called Muscles & Mayhem: An Unauthorized Story of American Gladiators was released on the streaming service Netflix.

== See also ==
- List of television game show franchises
