= MTN Gladiators =

- Genre: Sports entertainment game show
- Starring: Glenn Hicks; Ursula Chikane; James Lennox; Cyril Mitchley; Wayne "The Boss" Price; Ingrid Chantler; Marion Hind
- Country of origin: South Africa
- No. of series: 5 x Domestic series 1 x International Gladiators; 2 x Springbok Challenge

Production
- Producers: Keith Shaw (1999–2000); Donovan Marsh (2001)
- Production locations: Standard Bank Arena, Johannesburg (1999–2000); Big Top Arena, Carnival City (2001)
- Running time: 60 minutes

Original release
- Network: SABC3
- Release: 1999 – 2001

MTN Gladiators is a game show produced by MTN for SABC3 in South Africa from 1999 to 2001. Following South Africa's initial participation in the second International Gladiators and the first Springbok Challenge tournaments in Birmingham, England, the format developed a cult following in South Africa. In 1998 production finally began for a domestic series, eventually airing in 1999.

A special second Springbok Challenge series, known simply as Gladiators: Springbok Challenge 2, against a team of British Gladiators and contenders was filmed in South Africa in 2000.

== Format ==
The show pitted contestants in a variety of physical events against the 'Gladiators', who would attempt to prevent them from achieving maximum points on a variety of games. After this, the two contenders would race each other on the Eliminator, an assault course containing climbing, balancing, and cargo nets. The contender with the most points received a half second head start for every 1 point they were in front by.

== Production ==
All the MTN Gladiators tapings took place at the Standard Bank Arena, Johannesburg (1999–2000) and Big Top Arena, Carnival City (2001) in South Africa.

== Presenters and crew ==
The show was originally presented by Glenn Hicks, executive producer of the first four series, and Ursula Chikane. Following Glenn's departure from the show in 2000, he was replaced by James Lennox when it was resurrected for its penultimate fifth series in 2001.

The referees were legendary South African cricketer Cyril Mitchley (1999–2000) and international strongman Wayne "The Boss" Price (2001). The timekeepers over the show's run were Ingrid Chantler (1999–2000), and female Gladiator ICE in 2001, who was unable to compete due to pregnancy. The Gladiators and crowds alike were cheered on by a group of cheerleaders, known as G-Force.

== Gladiators ==
Alias	Gladiators career	Real name
Aqua/Ivory	Springbok Challenge (Ivory); Series 3 (Aqua)	Marieka Theunissen
Blade	Series 1 Series 2 Series 3 Series 4	Clint Walters
Delilah	International Gladiators 2	Louise Burnett
Diamond	Springbok Challenge; Series 5	Bernadette Beyer
Fire	Series 1 Series 2 Series 3 Series 4 Series 5	Magdalena Wysoczanska
Force	Series 1 Series 2 Series 3 Series 4	Joanne Parnell
Fox	Series 4 (UK); Series 5 (SA)	Tammy Baker
Gazelle	Springbok Challenge	Lara De Klerk
Giant	Series 2 Series 3 Series 4 Series 5	Matthew Haldenby
Gold	Series 1 Series 2	Sherry Rissik
Granite	Series 1 Series 2 Series 3 Series 4 Series 5	Garth Collins
Ice	Series 3 Series 4 Series 5 (timekeeper)	Marion Hind
Impi	International Gladiators 2 Series 1 Series 2	Bible Mhizha
Jackal	Springbok Challenge; Series 1 Series 2 Series 3	Dave Ridley
Jazz	Series 5	Bontle Litheko
Lightning	Series 2 Series 3 Series 4	Rene Roberts Patel
Lynx	Series 5	Mariska Nel
Nightshade	Series 1 Series 2 Series 3 Series 4	Nelly Mokohoana
Quartz	Series 1 Series 2 Series 3	Michelle Sievwright
Rhino	Series 3	Themba John
Sahara	International Gladiators 2 Springbok Challenge; Series 1 Series 3 Series 4	Christy Skoglund
Samson	International Gladiators 2	Bob Dahmen
Shadow	Series 2 Series 3 Series 4 Series 5	Desiré Thomas
Shaka	Springbok Challenge; Series 3	Warren Simango
Sheena	Springbok Challenge (SA)	Tina Andrew
Spider	Springbok Challenge; Series 1 Series 2 Series 3 Series 4 Series 5	Sergio Capellino
Thunder	Series 2 Series 3 Series 4 Series 5	Jade Russell
Tusk	Springbok Challenge; Series 1 Series 2 Series 3 Series 4	Shannon Gaskin
Venus	Series 5	Alex Dorrestein
Warrior	Series 1 Series 2 Series 3 Series 4 Series 5	Franco Kawaza
Wildebeest	Springbok Challenge; Series 1 Series 2 Series 3 Series 4 Series 5	Andries Coetzee

== Contenders ==
Series	Female Champion	Female Runner-Up	Male Champion	Male Runner-Up
1A	Natasha de Jongh	Nina Cave	Christo Blignaut	Patrick Dlamini
1B	Michelle Gray	Kirsten Meyer	Andre McDonald	Pieter Brits
Series 1 Champion Of Champions	Michelle Gray	Natasha de Jongh	Christo Blignaut	Andre McDonald
2A	Jenny Chalmers	Robyn Penton	Remington Mnkhawile	Shilo Bunce
2B	Kathryn van Niekerk	Dani Ridgeway	Craig Smith	Christo de Jager
3A	Nivea Sekele	Marelise Le Roux	Graham Green	Tyrone Agliotti
3B: SA National Forces Challenge	Nicky Seger (Navy)	Lizzie Allworth (Air Force)	Annes De Buryn (Medical)	Nick April (Navy)
3C: Africa Challenge	Natasha de Jongh (SA)	Elise Sauls (SA)	Remington Mnkhawile (SA)	Gray Chikowi (MW)
3D: Varsity Challenge	Marna Dipenaar (Pukke)	Penny Andrews (RAU)	Charles Steenkamp (Tukkies)	Juan Pretorius (RAU)
Series 2/3 Champion Of Champions	Nivea Sekele	Marna Dipenaar	Craig Smith	Remington Mnkhawile
4A: Springbok Trials	Nivea Sekele	Marna Dipenaar	Shilo Bunce	Juan Pretorius
4B: International Challenge	Andreya Wharry (UK)	Nivea Sekele (SA)	Mark Everitt (UK)	Shilo Bunce (SA)
5A	Fiddy Gey van Pittius	Karen-Marie Becker	Kwanele Gumbi	Luton Grobbelaar
5B	Vanessa Beckel	Leandri Vermeulen	Matt Linder	Leletuhu Ndyoko
