= Gladiators: Springbok Challenge 2 =

- Title card
- Genre: Game show
- Based on: American Gladiators by: Dann Carr; John Ferraro
- Starring: Glenn Hicks; Ursula Staplefeldt; Cyril Mitchley
- No. of episodes: 13

Production
- Producer: Keith Shaw
- Production locations: Standard Bank Arena, Johannesburg
- Running time: 60 minutes (inc. adverts)
- Production company: Shaw Pictures

Original release
- Network: SABC 3
- Release: March 2000 – July 2000

Gladiators: Springbok Challenge 2 (mentioned on-screen as The Second International Challenge) was a competition that comprised the second half of the fourth series of MTN Gladiators, the South African adaptation of the international Gladiators franchise.

The series saw a number of former domestic South African contenders, including past champions and finalists, compete against their British counterparts for the overall title of international champion. The format involved 24 contenders, each of whom would compete twice across two heats, to determine who would be selected by their team to compete in an overall grand final. Only contenders with two wins across the heats stage would be eligible for selection.

Broadcast in 2000 on SABC 3, it would be the last series of MTN Gladiators to be presented by Glenn Hicks, who had been with the programme since its inception, as well as the last series to be refereed by Cyril Mitchley.

== Broadcast ==
The series aired on Friday nights between 7pm and 8pm on SABC3, as mentioned several times on screen by Hicks and Staplefeldt. Several sources erroneously listed the series as airing between March 20 and July 3, 2000, however, these are Mondays, and eighteen weeks apart, suggesting these dates are not correct, seen as the series had only 13 episodes.

Notably, despite the inclusion of British contenders and Gladiators, it is the only series featuring either which has never been broadcast on British television, having been recorded after the final domestic series was broadcast on ITV.

After being largely unseen since its initial broadcast, ten of the 13 episodes resurfaced on YouTube for the first time in 2025.

== Contenders ==
=== United Kingdom ===
- Pauline Shirt — Series 7 quarter-finalist
- Louise Land — Series 7 standby contender
- Louise Raines — Series 7 runner-up
- Trudi Ballentine — Series 7 semi-finalist
- Andreya Wharry† — Series 5 & Springbok Challenge 1 champion, & Series 8 Runner-up
- Maria Ward^{1} — Series 7 semi-finalist
- Phil Norman — Series 2 champion, International Gladiators 1 & Series 8 semi-finalist
- Mick Jones — Series 7 standby contender
- Dave Walter — Series 7 & 8 champion
- Gary Johnson — Series 7 contender
- Mark Everitt ^{2}† — Series 4 champion, The Ashes 2 and Series 8 runner up
- Neil Parsley — Series 7 runner-up

=== South Africa ===
- Kirsten Meyer — Series 1B runner-up (Replaced Natasha De Johng in the Springbok Trials)
- Marelise Le Roux — Series 3 runner-up
- Marna Dippenaar — Student Challenge champion, Champion of Champions II & Springbok Trials runner-up
- Nicky Seger — SA National Forces Challenge champion & Springbok Trials semi-finalist
- Tammy Le Roux — Series 3 quarter-finalist
- Nivea Sekele — Series 3, Springbok Trials & Champion of Champions II champion
- Michael Toll ^{3} — Series 1B semi-finalist
- Jason van der Walt — Series 3 semi-finalist
- Charles Steenkamp — Student Challenge champion, Springbok Trials semi-finalist
- Juan Pretorius — Student Challenge runner-up & Springbok Trials runner-up
- Shilo Bunce — Series 2A runner-up & Springbok Trials champion
- Remington Mnkhawile — Series 2A & Africa Challenge champion, Champion of Champions II runner-up, Springbok Trials semi-finalist

† Overall Series Winner

- ^{1} Ward replaced Pauline Shirt after she was injured during Atlas Spheres in her first show.
- ^{2} Everitt replaced Phil Norman after he was injured during Duel in his second show.
- ^{3} Toll replaced Juan Pretorius after he was injured during Demolition Run in his second show.

== Gladiators ==
The British Gladiators team were largely made up of Gladiators who had featured in the final series of the domestic run, with the exception of Gold, who had not competed since Series 6, some three years before the series was filmed. Her brother, Jason, also appeared as a contender for the South African team and competed in the South African domestic series.

Notably, Fox (Tammy Baker) made such an impression on the South African producers, that she was later signed on for the fifth domestic South African series.

=== United Kingdom ===
- Fox — Tammy Baker
- Gold — Lize Van Der Walt
- Rio — Jane Omorogbe
- Siren — Alison Paton
- Vogue — Suzanne Cox
- Ace — Warren Furman
- Cobra — Michael Willson
- Hunter — James Crossley
- Rhino — Mark Smith
- Saracen — Mike Lewis

=== South Africa ===
- Force — Joanne Rossi
- Fire — Magdalena Wysoczanska
- Ice — Marion Hind
- Lightning — Rene Roberts Patel
- Nightshade — Nelly Mokohoana
- Sahara — Christy Skoglund
- Thunder — Jade Russell
- Blade — Clint Walters
- Giant — Matthew Haldenby
- Granite — Garth Collins
- Spider — Sergio Capellino
- Tusk — Shannon Gaskin
- Warrior — Franco Kawaza
- Wildebeest — Andries Coetzee

== Events ==
- Atlas Spheres — The South African version of Atlaspheres follows a different format to the international version. Five giant bowling pins are positioned across the arena floor. The contender has 60 seconds to knock as many of the pins down as possible, whilst the Gladiator tries to prevent them from scoring. Four pins are silver and are worth 2 points each - these must be knocked down first, before the contender can go for the final red pin, which is worth 4 points.
- Demolition Run — A South African version of Hit and Run, which follows the same rules as the original incarnation, albeit with slightly heavier demolition balls than those used in international versions.
- Duel — This event follows the same rules as the original incarnation.
- Gauntlet — This event normally follows the same rules as the original incarnation, except that all five gladiators use "Battle Sticks" instead of ram rods and power pads. For this series only, contenders are awarded two points per zone cleared and a ten-point bonus for clearing the Gauntlet in under fifteen seconds.
- Hang Tough — This event follows the same rules as the original incarnation.
- Powerball — As per the first Springbok Challenge, UK Series 7 and 8, and every SA MTN Gladiators series, contenders face two Gladiators rather than three. Each gladiator is assigned to a contender.
- Rat Race — A South African version of Pendulum, where the globe is positioned just above the arena floor, rather than in the air, and rotates rather than swings (hence why it's called a globe). Contenders are also chased by two Gladiators rather than one.
- Suspension Bridge — This event follows the same rules as the original incarnation.
- The Mountain — Announced as The Mountain but with a title card that reads MTN Mountain, this event follows the same rules as its international counterpart, The Wall, but with a much higher summit than any other international incarnation.
- Whiplash — Unlike its international counterparts, this version is played on a platform six feet above the arena floor, and involves the contender attempting to pull the Gladiator from the platform. If the contender gains control of the wishbone, they receive ten points. Pulling the Gladiator from the platform also receives ten, but a combination of the two earns fifteen points. Contenders are not allowed to step over the Gladiator, but the Gladiator is allowed to sit down unlike most other versions.
- Eliminator — Similar in design to its British counterpart, the only differences being that the hand ladder is slightly longer (and referred to as the Sky Ladder), and in place of the rolling beam/trapeze before the cargo net, contenders must drop down from the platform and climb through a "Spider's Web" (similar to Spaghetti Junction used in the fifth British series) back up to the platform to reach the cargo net. On the Travelator, contenders are not allowed to touch any black areas outside of the conveyor belt itself (hence the term, "Black No-Go Zone"), as this results in a penalty and both contenders being ordered back to the start of the balance beam for a "run off".

== Episodes ==
Bold indicates the winner of each competition. Like the Australian series, only four events are played in each episode prior to the Eliminator. Each contender competes in two heats, only by winning both of their heats could a contender qualify for selection by their team for the grand final.

Show Number	Contenders	Events played (excluding Eliminator)	Date of original transmission
Stage 1 ― Heat 1	Kirsten Meyer (SA); Pauline Shirt/**Maria Ward (UK)**; Phil Norman (UK); **Michael Toll (SA)**	Demolition Run (Hit & Run); Duel; Hang Tough; Atlaspheres	
Stage 1 ― Heat 2	**Louise Land (UK)**; Marelise Le Roux (SA); **Jason van der Walt (SA)**; Mick Jones (UK)	Demolition Run (Hit & Run); MTN Mountain (The Wall); Suspension Bridge; Rat Race (Pendulum)	
Stage 1 ― Heat 3	**Marna Dipenaar (SA)**; Louise Raines (UK); Dave Walter (UK); **Charles Steenkamp (SA)**	Atlaspheres; Whiplash; Duel; Hang Tough	
Stage 1 ― Heat 4	**Trudy Ballantine (UK)**; Nicky Seger (SA); **Juan Pretorius (SA)**; Gary Johnson (UK)	Demolition Run (Hit & Run); MTN Mountain (The Wall); Suspension Bridge; Hang Tough	
Stage 1 ― Heat 5	Tammy Le Roux (SA); **Andraya Wharry (UK)**; **Mark Everitt (UK)**; Shilo Bunce (SA)	Demolition Run (Hit & Run); MTN Mountain (The Wall); Suspension Bridge; Hang Tough	
Stage 1 ― Heat 6	Maria Ward (UK); **Nivea Sekele (SA)**; **Remington Mnkhawile (SA)**; Neil Parsley (UK)	Powerball; MTN Mountain (The Wall); Duel; Atlaspheres	
Stage 2 ― Heat 1	Louise Raines (UK); **Marelise Le Roux (SA)**; Charles Steenkamp (SA); Phil Norman/**Mark Everitt (UK)**	Atlaspheres; Whiplash; Duel; Rat Race (Pendulum)	
Stage 2 ― Heat 2	??? (SA) ??? (UK) ??? (UK); Michael Toll (SA)		
Stage 2 ― Heat 3	**Marna Dipenaar (SA)**; Maria Ward (UK); Neil Parsley (UK); Juan Pretorius/**Michael Toll (SA)**	Demolition Run (Hit & Run); Suspension Bridge; MTN Mountain (The Wall); Atlaspheres	
Stage 2 ― Heat 4	**Andraya Wharry (UK)**; Nicky Seger (SA); Remington Mnkhawile (SA); **Mark Everitt (UK)**	Atlaspheres; Duel; Whiplash; Rat Race (Pendulum)	
Stage 2 ― Heat 5	Trudy Ballentine (UK); **Kirsten Meyer (SA)**; Jason van der Walt (SA); **Gary Johnson (UK)**	Demolition Run (Hit & Run); Duel; Hang Tough; Gauntlet	
Stage 2 ― Heat 6	??? (SA) ??? (UK) ??? (UK); Shilo Bunce (SA)		
Grand Final	Nivea Sekele (SA); **Andraya Wharry (UK)**; Shilo Bunce (SA); **Mark Everitt (UK)**		
