= Lani Tupu =

New Zealand actor

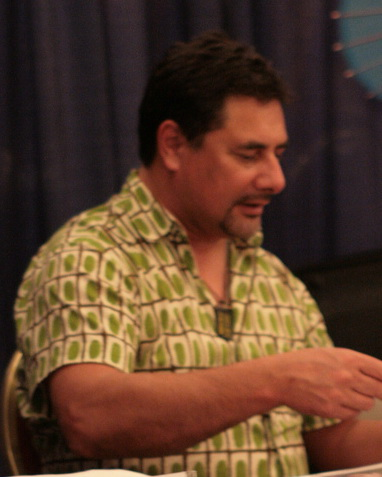
- Tupu at DragonCon 2009
- Born: 4 November 1955 (age 71); Auckland, New Zealand
- Other names: John Tupu, Larney Tupu
- Education: Rongotai College; Wellington Teachers' Training College; New Zealand Drama School (1979)
- Occupation: Actor
- Known for: Farscape

Lani Tupu (born 4 November 1955), billed variously as Larney Tupu, John Tupu and Lani John Tupu, is a New Zealand actor, known for his dual role as Bialar Crais and the voice of Pilot in the series Farscape.

== Early life ==
Tupu was born in 1955 to an English mother and a Samoan father. He was named after his father Lani Tupu, who was also an actor. Tupu started acting in church plays. He was educated at Rongotai College and Wellington Teachers' Training College. He was awarded a Queen Elizabeth II Arts Council Bursary in 1977 to study as New Zealand Drama School. When he graduated drama school in 1979, he was the first Samoan to do so.

== Career ==
Tupu began his career as a singer, and as a dancer on music show Ready to Roll. The year before he was accepted to drama school, he made his television debut in an episode of thriller Epidemic.

After graduating from drama school, Tupu moved to Auckland, where he was part of the Theatre Corporate company for three years, before spending two years at the Mercury Theatre. He then landed the lead role of Dr Miller in prime-time soap opera Country GP, remaining on the show for two seasons, from 1984 to 1985.

Tupu then moved to Australia to pursue other acting opportunities. He co-founded an Australian theatre group called The Walkers and Talkers, alongside other New Zealanders. He had guest roles in television series including A Country Practice, Richmond Hill, the 1988 reboot of Mission: Impossible and Embassy. He returned to New Zealand to make his film debut, in 1988 New Zealand comedy Send a Gorilla, He then featured in 1989 American vigilante action film The Punisher, based on the Marvel comic of the same name, playing Laccone, opposite Dolph Lundgren and Louis Gossett Jr.

In 1992, Tupu played the recurring role of David Goldberg, alongside Gary Sweet and Steve Bastoni in the second season of ABC series Police Rescue, before returning to New Zealand to play the role of straight-laced casino manager David Spence in two seasons of drama series Marlin Bay.

In 1993, he featured in the Auckland premiere of John Kneubuhl's play Think of a Garden, directed by Nathaniel Lees, which reviewers compared to Bruce Mason's The End of the Golden Weather, in terms of being iconic for New Zealand. He also appeared in 1993 Australian TV movie The Feds: Abduction. Guest roles followed in Time Trax, G.P., High Tide, The New Adventures of Flipper and Tales of the South Seas.

Tupu made his debut screen directing role in 1996, with short film Talk of the Town. The short was an episode of Tala Pasifika, an anthology series of short dramas showcasing Samoan talent, written by Lisa Taouma, before appearing in 1997 American TV film Heart of Fire, based on heroic New Zealand firefighter Royd Kennedy. He had a recurring guest role in Australian comedy series House Gang, before making guesting in several episodes of American fantasy series The Lost World, based on the 1912 novel of the same name by Arthur Conan Doyle.

After having originally auditioned for the role of D’Argo sci-fi series Farscape, in 1999, Tupu landed the two major ongoing roles of Bailar Crais and the voice of Moya's Pilot, appearing in the series until 2003. He reprised his role as Pilot in the 2004 miniseries Farscape: The Peacekeeper Wars.

During this time, Tupu also had roles in the TV films Green Sails and The Finder and made guest appearances in the TV series Stingers and Grass Roots. He also took on further film roles in the acclaimed 2001 Australian mystery-drama Lantana, alongside Barbara Hershey, Anthony LaPaglia and Geoffrey Rush, and 2003 drama Liquid Bridge with Ryan Kwanten.

In 2007, Tupu landed a recurring guest role in long-running soap opera Home and Away, playing Lou Baines. That same year, he appeared in American action film The Condemned with Steve Austin and Vinnie Jones and performed in a stage production of Pulitzer Prize-winning play Anna in the Tropics for Sydney's Belvoir Theatre.

Guest roles in drama miniseries The Cut and police procedural series Rush were followed by roles in 2011 sci-fi adventure film Robotropolis and 2012 comedy-thriller film The King Is Dead!, alongside Dan Wyllie and Anthony Hayes. Tupu's television guest appearances continued in series including Packed to the Rafters, Camp, Redfern Now, The Code, The Letdown, Fighting Season and Reef Break before he had a significant guest role in 2019, in season 4 of AMC supernatural adventure series Preacher, developed by Seth Rogen.

In 2020, Tupu had a recurring role in Reckoning, and narrated the documentary series Sydney's Super Tunnel. He then had a guest role in drama series Wakefield. In 2023, Tupu appeared as a voice actor on Shadows at the Door: The Podcast, before playing the guest role of Eldon Sami in the second season of Paramount+ crime series Last King of the Cross opposite Lincoln Younes the following year.

More recently, Tupu played the recurring role of the Defence Barrister in 2024 SBS series The Jury: Death on the Staircase, a re-enactment of a real manslaughter case, presented before a new jury of everyday Australians. he resumed his narration duties in the second series of Sydney's Super Tunnel in 2025. In 2026, he appeared in an episode of children's series Caper Crew, with Tina Bursill. and played Viktor Shevchenko in Return to Paradise.

Tupu established Screen Actors Studio in the late 1990s, and has worked as an acting coach at Toi Whakaari in Wellington, and Sydney's National Institute of Dramatic Art (NIDA). He also performs voice work, including on SBS. Mario Gaoa a Niu FM radio host and star of the Naked Samoans theatre company describes Tupu as one of three godfathers of Pacific theatre, along with Jay Laga'aia and Nathaniel Lees.

== Awards ==
Year	Work	A Ward	Category	Result	Ref.
1984	Country GP	Feltex Awards	Best New Talent	Won	
1986	Send a Gorilla	Listener Film and Television Awards	Best Supporting Actor	Nominated	

== Filmography ==
=== Film ===
Year	Title	Role	Notes	Ref.
1979	Sons for the Return Home	Minor role		
1988	Send a Gorilla	Ian Hunter		
1989	The Punisher	Laccone		
1996	Talk of the Town		Short	
2001	Lantana	Patrick's Lover		
2003	Liquid Bridge	Sharky Garcia		
2007	The Condemned	El Salvador Warden		
2009	Dear Diary	Dan	Short	
2009	Broken Hill	Maestro Pindari (voice)		
2011	Robotropolis	Gordon Standish		
2012	The King Is Dead!	Boss Maori		
2012	Marla	Carlos	Short	
2015	Mise-En-Abyme	Ryan Cumberford	Short	
2021	Under the Concrete	Watchman	Short	
2024	The Flower Man	Radio Gary	Short	

=== Television ===
Year	Title	Role	Notes	Ref.
1976	Epidemic	Tini	Miniseries, 1 episode	
1984–1985	Country GP	David Miller	2 seasons	
1985	Roche	Siosi Vaumauga	1 episode	
1986–1987	A Country Practice	Richard Monti	4 episodes	
1988	Richmond Hill	Phillip Davidson	1 episode	
1990	Mission: Impossible	Michael Otagi	1 episode	
1990	Embassy	Kalim	1 episode	
1992	Police Rescue	David Goldberg	Season 2, 6 episodes	
1992	Marlin Bay	David Spence	2 seasons	
1994	Time Trax	Col. Nabib Kila	1 episode	
1994	G.P.	Brian Farmer	1 episode	
1994; 1995	High Tide	Rev. Simon Henry	2 episodes	
1995	The Feds: Abduction	Idris Karya	TV film	
1996	Flipper	Count Vicente	1 episode	
1997	Heart of Fire	Roger Parks	TV film	
1998	Tales of the South Seas	Caleb Trader	1 episode	
1998	House Gang	Dennis	2 episodes	
1999	The Lost World	River Guide	TV film	
1999–2000	The Lost World	Capicotchi, Chief Guide / Tolmac / Prince Apep's Slave	4 episodes	
1999–2003	Farscape	Bialar Crais / Pilot (voice)	Main role	
2000	Green Sails	CCT Negotiator	TV film	
2001	The Finder (aka Trackdown)	Lyle Riskin	TV film	
2002	Marshall Law	Dylan Boyd	Unaired original pilot	
2002; 2004	Stingers	Ellery Berman / Consul Khemal Lazo	2 episodes	
2003	Grass Roots	Lynton Aubrey	2 episodes	
2004	Farscape: The Peacekeeper Wars	Pilot (voice)	Miniseries, 2 episodes	
2006	Monarch Cove	Joe	1 episode	
2007	Home and Away	Lou Baines	2 episodes	
2007	The Sun's Search for the Moon	Blue God (voice)	Miniseries, 1 episode	
2009	The Cut	Norberto Silwa	1 episode	
2010	Rush	Pell Fisher	1 episode	
2012	Packed to the Rafters	Psychic Simon	1 episode	
2013	Camp	Dr. Welter	1 episode	
2013	Redfern Now	Minister	1 episode	
2014	The Code	Thom	1 episode	
2017	The Letdown	Jimmy	2 episodes	
2018	Fighting Season	David Simpson	1 episode	
2019	Preacher	Deputy Prime Minister of New Zealand Winston Peters	Season 4, episode 2	
2019	Reef Break	Denian	1 episode	
2020	The Gloaming	Event MC	1 episode	
2020	Reckoning	Dr Horatio Cabrera	3 episodes	
2020; 2025	Sydney's Super Tunnel	Narrator	8 episodes	
2021	Wakefield	Baz's Neighbour	Miniseries, 1 episode	
2024	Last King of the Cross	Eldon Sami	1 episode	
2024	The Jury: Death on the Staircase	Defence Barrister	3 episodes	
2026	Caper Crew	Mr D	1 episode	
2026	Return to Paradise	Viktor Shevchenko		

== Theatre ==
Year	Title	Role	Notes	Ref.
	Beauty and the Beast	The Beast	Theatre Corporate, Auckland	
1970	Everyman		City Gallery Wellington	
1978	The Shadow Box	Sound Artist	NZ Drama School	
1979	What if You Died Tomorrow?		NZ Drama School	
1980	The Stationary Sixth Form Poetry Trip	Vishnu	Theatre Corporate, Auckland	
1981	Piaf		Theatre Corporate, Auckland	
1981	Who's Randy		Theatre Corporate, Auckland	
1981	As You Like It	Orlando	Theatre Corporate, Auckland	
1982	Dracula	Jonathan Harker	Mercury Theatre, Auckland	
1982	Amadeus	Venticello	Mercury Theatre, Auckland	
1983	King Lear	Gloucester	Circa Theatre, Wellington	
1989	Our Country's Good	Lieutenant Ralph Clark	Court Theatre, Christchurch	
1992	Lovelock's Dream Run	Silvers	ANU, Canberra	
1992–1993	Think of a Garden	The Writer / Narrator	Canberra, Watershed Theatre, Auckland	
1997	The Tempest	Stephano / Antonio	Melbourne Athenaeum with Bell Shakespeare	
2007	Anna in the Tropics	Santiago	Belvoir, Sydney with Theatron Group (also manager)	
2009	References to Salvador Dalí Make Me Hot	The Moon	Stables Theatre, Sydney with Griffin Theatre Company	
2010	Ben Hur	Sheik Ilderim	Stadefrance	
2017	Between the Streetlight & the Moon		KXT on Broadway	
2023	La Cage Aux Folles	Edouard Dindon	The Concourse Theatre, Sydney	
2023	Black Sun Blood Moon	Police Officer / Lawyer / various	National tour with Critical Stages	
2026	The Comedy of Errors	Duke Solinus / Balthazar / Ensemble	NSW tour with Sport for Jove	

== Podcasts ==
Year	Title	Role	Notes	Ref.
2023	Shadows at the Door	Cohen Grant	1 episode	
2025	Snap! Crackle, Pop!	Voice		

== Video game ==
Year	Title	Role	Notes	Ref.
2002	Farscape: The Game	Captain Bialar Crais / Pilot (voice)	Video game	
