= Robotropolis =

- Promotional poster
- Directed by: Christopher Hatton
- Written by: Christopher Hatton
- Starring: Zoe Naylor; Graham Sibley; Edward Foy
- Release date: September 2, 2011
- Running time: 80 minutes
- Countries: United States; Singapore
- Language: English

Robotropolis is a science-fiction action adventure film written and directed by Christopher Hatton and starring Zoe Naylor, Graham Sibley and Edward Foy.

== Synopsis ==
A group of reporters are covering the unveiling of a new facility that is completely maintained by robot prototypes. When one of the robots goes haywire, the reporters find themselves not just reporting on the malfunction, but fighting for their lives.

== Cast ==
- Zoe Naylor as Christiane Nouveau
- Graham Sibley as Danny Ross
- Edward Foy as Jason Brooks
- Lani John Tupu as Gordon Standish
- Jourdan Lee Khoo as Harlan
- Karina Sindicich as Lisa
- Peer Metze as Luther Kobler
- Tonya Cornelisse as Sky Bennett
- Bjorn Turmann as Tobin
- Remesh Panicker as Dr. Roshan Manik

== Reception ==
- The Guardian gave it a negative review saying "Humans in the middle of robo-armageddon should be a recipe for fun. But this does not compute".
- Ain't it Cool News gave it a positive review saying "With some decent acting and some nicely done effects, there’s a lot to like about ROBOTROPOLIS despite its shortcomings."

== Sequels ==
The plot of Robotropolis is continued in Battle of the Damned (2013).
