= Tonya Cornelisse =

American actress

- Education: New York University (BFA)
- Occupations: Actor, writer
- Years active: 2000–present
- Website: Official website

Tonya Cornelisse is an American actress.

== Education ==
Cornelisse earned her BFA in theatre from the New York University Tisch School of Performing Arts along with a degree in psychology.

== Career ==
Cornelisse starred in films like Liminal, Yellow, Lost Time, A Leading Man, Pelé: Birth of a Legend and The Wolves of Savin Hill.

Cornelisse's theater work includes Buried Child, Who's Afraid of Virginia Woolf? and STOP IT!.

Cornelisse provided the audio for the Hidden Series’ audio books.

== Filmography ==
=== Film ===
| Year | Title | Role | Notes |
|---|---|---|---|
| 2000 | The Gypsy Years | Charlotte Jenkins | |
| 2002 | 25th Hour | Prep Student | Uncredited |
| 2004 | Zombie Honeymoon | Nikki Boudreaux | |
| 2006 | Underdogs | Marilyn | |
| 2011 | Robotropolis | Sky Bennett | |
| 2011 | The Blue of Noon | Eyed Sad Woman | |
| 2012 | Wolfpack of Reseda | Debbie from HR | |
| 2012 | Yellow | Starla | |
| 2012 | Crave | AA Girlfriend | |
| 2013 | A Leading Man | Megan | |
| 2014 | Lost Time | Gillian | |
| 2014 | The Wolves of Savin Hill | Cassandra | |
| 2015 | Midnight Sex Run | Kelsey | |
| 2016 | Pelé: Birth of a Legend | Swedish Girl | |
| 2016 | Threshold | Book Club Member | |
| 2017 | Grow House | Tonnie | |
| 2017 | Abigail | Abigail | |
| 2018 | Bent | Helen | |
| 2019 | Mope | Tampa | |
| 2020 | Dolittle | The Island Milkmaid | Uncredited |
| 2020 | Love Is Not Love | Joelle | |
| 2022 | Slumberland | Agent Red | |

=== Television ===
| Year | Title | Role | Notes |
|---|---|---|---|
| 2000 | Strangers with Candy | Track Star | Episode: "Blank Relay" |
| 2005 | As the World Turns | Java Waitress | 3 episodes |
| 2005 | Law & Order: SVU | Claire | Episode: "Alien" |
| 2007 | ER | Emily Wilson | Episode: "Crisis of Conscience" |
| 2007 | Afterworld | Amy | 4 episodes |
| 2009 | NCIS | Kayla Vacari | Episode: "Caged" |
| 2010 | For a Green Card | Kissing Girl on Bench | Episode: "The Sanctity of Marriage: Part 1" |
| 2011 | Parks and Recreation | Juliet | Episode: "Andy and April's Fancy Party" |
| 2011 | Let It Go Already | Ginger | Miniseries |
| 2016 | Scandal | Racer Jacket Lady | 2 episodes |
| 2016 | How to Get Away with Murder | Sketchy Woman | Episode: "Don't Tell Annalise" |
| 2017 | Judy and Me | Barrel Jessup | Episode: "Unusual Suspect" |
| 2019 | Catastrophe | Mrs. Cohen | Episode #4.5 |
| 2020 | Hitmen | Liz | 4 episodes |
| 2020 | Sisters | Allie | 11 episodes |
| 2020 | The Homemade Sketch Show | Sketch Comedian | 8 episodes |
| 2021–present | Yellowjackets | Allie Stevens | 2 episodes |
