= Jack J. Yang =

American actor

- Born: Jack Jung-Kai Yang; 1974 (age 51–52); Toronto, Ontario, Canada
- Occupation: Actor
- Years active: 2003–present

Chinese name
- Traditional Chinese: 楊榮凱
- Simplified Chinese: 杨荣凯
Transcriptions
Standard Mandarin
- Hanyu Pinyin: Yáng Róngkǎi

Jack Jung-Kai Yang (simplified Chinese: 杨荣凯; traditional Chinese: 楊榮凱; pinyin: Yáng Róngkǎi) (born 1974) is an American-Canadian actor of Taiwanese ethnicity. He was born in Toronto, Ontario, Canada and currently resides in Los Angeles, California.

== Filmography ==
- The Yellow Truth as Jack (2003)
- Shadow Chaser (2003)
- Law & Order: Special Victims Unit as Ricky Yao (2004)
- Skin Trade (short film) as The Designer (2004)
- The Seat Filler as Page (2004)
- CSI: Miami as Shawn Kimsey (2005)
- All of Us as Harry (2005)
- Grey's Anatomy as Walter (2005-2007)
- Bones as Ming Tsou (2005-2007)
- Nip/Tuck as Chiyo (2006)
- The Evidence as Ha Huang (2006)
- Scrubs as Patient (2006)
- ER as Bevan Wong (2007)
- Seven Pounds as Apogee Engineer (2008)
- Need for Speed: Undercover (video game) as Chau Wu (2008)
- Command & Conquer: Red Alert 3 (video game) as Commander Kenji Tenzai (2008)
- Samurai Girl as Hiko (2008)
- The Mummy: Tomb of the Dragon Emperor (video game) as General Yang (2008)
- Cashmere Mafia as Jason Chung (2008)
- Knight Rider as Cross (2008)
- Chuck as Jason Wang (2009)
- Command & Conquer: Red Alert 3 – Uprising (video game) as Commander Kenji Tenzai (2009)
- Point of Entry Season 4 as Glenn Chua (2013)
- A Leading Man as GQ (2013)
- American Ultra as Gangster (2015)
- Star as Elliot (2017)
- Lucifer (season 3 episode 6) as police inspector (2017)
- Justice League (2017) as Garrett Bowman
- Shadowhunters as Asmodeus (2018–2019)
