= Steven J. Kung =

Taiwanese-American Filmmaker

Steven Jen-Hon Kung is a Taiwanese American film director and writer.

== Early life and education ==
Kung was born and raised in Virginia Beach, Virginia where he attended Kempsville High School. He received a BA with High Distinction in Foreign Affairs from the University of Virginia, and an MFA in Motion Picture Producing from the Peter Stark Program at the University of Southern California School of Cinematic Arts.

== Career in film ==
Kung worked as an assistant producer on the film Mad Men and associate producer on the film "The Man Who Shook the Hand of Vicente Fernandez", starring Ernest Borgnine. Kung's documentary, SPEW: The World of Competitive Debate, premiered at the Independent Film Festival of Boston. He was the writer and director of the narrative feature, A Leading Man, which premiered at the Hawaii International Film Festival It was the first film he had directed, and it won awards for Best Drama, Best Actor and Best Supporting Actor at the Asians on Film Festival. In 2014, PolicyMic listed Kung as one of six Asian-American Filmmakers shattering America's Asian Film Bias. He is currently a director in the Disney ABC Directing Program for the 2016-2018 television seasons.
