= Gladiators (2008 Australian TV series) =

- Genre: Sports entertainment
- Created by: Dan Carr; John Ferraro
- Developed by: Endemol Southern Star (Licensed from MGM Television)
- Presented by: Tom Williams; Zoe Naylor
- Starring: Bill Harrigan; John Forsyth
- Announcer: Andy Paschalidis
- Theme music composer: Neil Sutherland
- Country of origin: Australia
- Original language: English
- No. of seasons: 1
- No. of episodes: 15

Production
- Executive producers: Rikkie Proost; Lisa Fitzpatrick
- Production locations: The Dome, Sydney Showground, New South Wales
- Editor: Thom Cochoran
- Camera setup: Multiple-camera setup
- Running time: 60 minutes (including commercials)
- Production company: Endemol Southern Star

Original release
- Network: Seven Network
- Release: 30 March – 6 July 2008

Related
- Gladiators (1995–1997); Gladiators (2024)

Gladiators is an Australian television series which aired on the Seven Network in 2008. It was a revival of the earlier series of the same name, and was based on the American version of the show, which was also revived in 2008.

The revival of Gladiators was first announced in September 2007, and premiered on 30 March 2008 at 6:30 pm. The Challengers in this series competed to win A$50,000 and a new Subaru Forester. The revival lasted for one season.

In July 2023, following the BBC’s revival of the British version, the show was confirmed to return for the second time, set to be revived by Warner Bros. Television Studios and began broadcasting on Network Ten on 15 January 2024, hosted by Beau Ryan and Liz Ellis, but was cancelled in May later that year due to a lack of audience.

== Production ==
The show was filmed at The Dome at the Sydney Showground, and was hosted by Tom Williams and Zoe Naylor. Well known NRL referee Bill Harrigan was one of the two referees for the show, the other was John Forsythe, who was a referee on the original series. Although not credited, the Sydney Altitude Cheerleaders were present in every episode, doing various routines throughout each episode whether an event was taking place or not.

Behind the scenes, military fitness expert 'Chief' Brabon (head strength & conditioning coach) was responsible for preparing the gladiators for their extremely physical roles.

=== Selection process ===
To ensure that both Gladiators, and Challengers were of the highest possible calibre, all prospects were submitted to a grueling physical selection process designed by the shows head strength & conditioning coach 'Chief' Brabon.

Chief's gruelling 'Barrier Test' was based on similar selection programs that he had designed for elite military and law enforcement tactical response teams around the world.

The barrier test was so successful at vetting would-be Gladiators & Challengers that less than 10% of applicants successfully completed the first event known as the "Grunt Challenge". The challenge required participants to do a burpee style exercise (Grunts) to a cadence called by Chief himself. Prospective Challengers were required to complete a minimum of 75 Grunts to pass through to the next event, whereas Gladiators were required to complete 100 Grunts.

=== Pre-series training ===
Once Chief and the producers had selected the final 13 Gladiators, they entered Chief's intensive 6 week preparation program known as "Camp Agoga". Along with wife and fellow coach Emilie Brabon-Hames, Chief set about transforming the team both aesthetically and athletically, in order to achieve their demigod like looks and ability.

== Results ==
Note: Challengers which are bolded advanced through to the next stage. Times listed next to the challengers' name is their runtime for the Eliminator. DNR indicates the challenger did not run the Eliminator due to the other challenger pulling out from injury. The colour indicates what the challenger was wearing for each episode. The challengers also have the state they were from represented next to their name.

=== Men ===
Heats
**Damien Nicholls (SA)**	0:55
Sam Brodie (QLD)
Simon Pavolo (VIC)
**Nathan Wood (NSW)**	1:05
Marcus Saltmarsh (QLD)
**Nick Hicks (SA)**	1:04
**Phillip Breslin (QLD)**	0:57
Shane Elisara (NSW)
Shaun Baxter (WA)
**Joseph McKay (VIC)**	1:06
**Lincoln Burns (VIC)**	1:08
Nikolai Sawaszenko (NSW)
James Stretch (WA)
**Simon Orton (QLD)**	DNR
**Paul Baird (VIC)**	0:56
Hayden Forder (WA)

Quarterfinals
Damien Nicholls (SA)
**Nick Hicks (SA)**	1:01
Nathan Wood (NSW)
**Phillip Breslin (QLD)**	0:56
**Joseph McKay (VIC)**	1:04
Lincoln Burns (VIC)
Simon Orton (QLD)
**Paul Baird (VIC)**	1:07

Semifinals
**Nick Hicks (SA)**	0:57
Philip Breslin (QLD)
Joseph McKay (VIC)
**Paul Baird (VIC)**	0:58

Grand Final
Nick Hicks (SA)
**Paul Baird (VIC)**	0:52

The eventual winner of the Grand Final was Paul Baird from Victoria (the youngest challenger of the series).

=== Women ===
Heats
**Natasha Haines (VIC)**	1:19
Bryony Barker (NSW)
**Georgie Leake (QLD)**	1:27
Janere Reid (SA)
Julie Casella (VIC)
Jules Clinch (WA)/**Nicole Sawon (SA)**	1:22
Rony Lebovics (QLD)
**Ashleigh Kelly (VIC)**	DNR
**Jacqueline Watson (NSW)**	1:26
Emily Sharp (SA)
**Kim Papp (SA)**	1:26
Louise Symonds (QLD)
Michelle Halemai (NSW)
**Michaela Williams (VIC)**	1:36
**Kristine Banks-Smith (VIC)**	1:28
Jessica Scott (NSW)

Quarterfinals
Nicole Sawon (SA)
**Natasha Haines (VIC)**	1:11
**Georgie Leake (QLD)**	1:16
Ashleigh Kelly (VIC)
Kim Papp (SA)
**Jacqueline Watson (NSW)**	1:20
Kristine Banks-Smith (VIC)
**Michaela Williams (VIC)**	1:52

Semifinals
**Natasha Haines (VIC)**	1:24
Georgie Leake (QLD)
**Jacqueline Watson (NSW)**	1:20
Michaela Williams (VIC)

Grand Final
**Natasha Haines (VIC)**	1:12
Jacqueline Watson (NSW)

Winner of the Grand Final was Natasha Haines (now Natasha Anderson) from Victoria.

== Episodes ==
No.	Title	Original release date
1	Episode 1	30 March 2008
Events: Gauntlet, Duel, Pyramid, Pendulum
2	Episode 2	6 April 2008
Events: Hit and Run, The Wall, Sumo Ball, Pyramid
3	Episode 3	13 April 2008
Events: Hang Tough, Atlasphere, Suspension Bridge, Vertigo
4	Episode 4	20 April 2008
Pendulum, Gauntlet, Hang Tough, Powerball
5	Episode 5	27 April 2008
Events: Duel, Vertigo, Pyramid, Hit and Run
6	Episode 6	4 May 2008
Events: Gauntlet, Hit and Run, Sumo Ball, The Wall
7	Episode 7	11 May 2008
Events: Gauntlet, Duel, Pendulum, Pyramid
8	Episode 8	18 May 2008
Events: Suspension Bridge, Powerball, Hang Tough, Atlasphere
9	Episode 9	25 May 2008
Events: Pendulum, Whiplash, Gauntlet, The Wall
10	Episode 10	1 June 2008
Events: Atlasphere, Vertigo, Suspension Bridge, Pyramid
11	Episode 11	8 June 2008
Events: Gauntlet, Hang Tough, Powerball, Sumo Ball
12	Episode 12	15 June 2008
Events: Hit and Run, The Wall, Duel, Pyramid
13	Episode 13	22 June 2008
Events: Vertigo, Suspension Bridge, Powerball, The Wall
14	Episode 14	29 June 2008
Events: Pendulum, Gauntlet, Duel, Whiplash
15	Episode 15	6 July 2008
Events: Gauntlet, Hang Tough, Sumo Ball, Pyramid

== Episode Scores ==
=== Heat 1 ===
Female

Events	Natasha	Bryony	Gladiators
Gauntlet	10	0	Bionica, Olympia, Destiny, Viper, Amazon
Duel	0	10 - Foul On Amazon	Destiny & Amazon
Pyramid	0	0	Olympia & Viper
Pendulum	0	0	Angel & Nitro
Total scores	10	10	

Male

Events	Damien	Sam	Gladiators
Gauntlet	10	0	Outlaw, Hunter, Tank, Kouta, Thunder
Duel	0	0	Kouta & Thunder
Pyramid	10	10 - Foul On Outlaw	Scar & Outlaw
Pendulum	10	0	Nomad & Hunter
Total scores	30	10	

The Eliminator

- Winners: Natasha and Damien

Incidents

- Duel: Amazon stepped onto Bryony's platform before falling off and was disqualified. But the result remained the same.
- Pyramid: Outlaw tackled Sam while he was on the first step, which you cannot do.

=== Heat 2 ===
Female

Events	Georgie	Janere	Gladiators
Hit & Run	2	0	Destiny, Bionica, Olympia, Viper
The Wall	10	0	Angel & Nitro
Sumo Ball	10 - Foul & Amazon Ejected	5	Amazon & Viper
Pyramid	0	0	Olympia & Destiny
Total scores	22	5	

Male

Events	Simon	Nathan	Gladiators
Hit & Run	4	4	Thunder, Tank, Kouta, Scar
The Wall	10	0	Nomad & Hunter
Sumo Ball	0	0	Thunder & Tank
Pyramid	0	0 - Foul On Challenger	Outlaw & Kouta
Total scores	14	4	

The Eliminator

- Winners: Georgie and Nathan

Incidents

- Sumo Ball: Amazon took her hands off the ball while Georgie was still on the platform. She was initially warned and also disqualified, giving ten points to Georgie. Amazon was then ejected for insulting Bill Harrigan.
- Pyramid: Nathan was disqualified for grabbing Kouta first. Bill checked who was at fault because if Kouta had been disqualified, Nathan would have been awarded 10 points.

=== Heat 3 ===
Female

Events	Julie	Jules/Nicole	Gladiators
Hang Tough	0	0 - Jules Injured	Angel & Nitro
Atlaspheres	4	6	Destiny & Bionica
Suspension Bridge	10	0	Amazon & Destiny
Verigo	0	10	Olympia & Viper
Total scores	14	16	

Male

Events	Marcus	Nick	Gladiators
Hang Tough	10 - Foul & Warning on Outlaw	0	Outlaw & Nomad
Atlaspheres	0	0	Kouta & Thunder
Suspension Bridge	0	0	Tank & Thunder
Vertigo	0	10	Scar & Hunter
Total scores	14	16	

The Eliminator

- Winners: Nicole and Nick

Incidents

- Hang Tough: Outlaw grabbed Marcus by the collarbone area where Catherine Arlove was injured in 1996. As of 2008, a new rule was established making grabbing near the collarbone area illegal. As a result, Outlaw was given a yellow card, and Marcus was given ten points.
- Hang Tough/Atlaspheres: Jules was injured in the ribs and could not carry on after one event. As a result, Nicole replaced her.

=== Heat 4 ===
Female

Events	Rony	Ashleigh	Gladiators
Pendulum	10	10	Viper & Olympia
Gauntlet	0	0	Bionica, Nitro, Destiny, Viper, Amazon
Hang Tough	5	10 - Foul On Angel	Nitro & Angel
Powerball	2 - Rony Injured	2 - Foul on Amazon	Amazon, Viper, Destiny
Total scores	17	22	

Male

Events	Phillip	Shane	Gladiators
Pendulum	10	10	Hunter & Scar
Gauntlet	10	5	Scar, Tank, Kouta, Hunter, Thunder
Hang Tough	5	0	Outlaw & Hunter
Powerball	2	2	Outlaw, Scar, Kouta
Total scores	27	17	

The Eliminator

- Winners: Phillip and Ashleigh

Incidents

- Hang Tough: Ashleigh would have had five points for hanging in the scoring zone. But Angel was disqualified for holding onto a ring for more than ten seconds. As a result, Ashleigh was given an extra five points for a total of 10 points for this event.
- Powerball: Amazon Tackled Ashleigh above the shoulder, and two penalty points were awarded instead of a yellow card because there wasn't a stoppage.
- Powerball: Rony sustained a knee injury after a tackle from Amazon. If an injury occurs before the eliminator, they forefit and can't be replaced. Hence, Ashley did not run the eliminator.

=== Heat 5 ===
Female

Events	Jacquie	Emily	Gladiators
Duel	0	0	Amazon & Destiny
Vertigo	0	0	Olympia & Angel
Pyramid	0	0	Viper & Bionica
Hit & Run	6	10	Angel, Nitro, Olympia, Viper
Total scores	6	10	

Male

Events	Shaun	Joe	Gladiators
Duel	0 - Foul On Challenger	0	Tank & Thunder
Vertigo	0	10 - Scar wasn't even close	Outlaw & Scar
Pyramid	0	0	Kouta & Hunter
Hit & Run	12	6	Tank, Nomad, Outlaw, Kouta
Total scores	12	16	

The Eliminator

- Winners: Jacqueline and Joseph

Incidents

- Duel: Shaun touched Tank's platform, which meant he was disqualified.

=== Heat 6 ===
Female

Events	Kim	Louise	Gladiators
Gauntlet	10 - Missed Disqualification Call	0	Bionica, Olympia, Destiny, Viper, Amazon
Hit & Run	6	0	Nitro, Viper, Olympia, Angel
Sumo Ball	10	0	Destiny & Amazon
The Wall	10	5	Nitro & Angel
Total scores	36	5	

Male

Events	Lincoln	Nikolai	Gladiators
Gauntlet	0 - Warning on Thunder	10 - Foul on Tank	Hunter, Tank, Kouta, Outlaw, Thunder
Hit & Run	0	0	Scar, Kouta, Hunter, Nomad
Sumo Ball	0	0	Thunder & Scar
The Wall	10	0 - Nikolai Injured but Cleared	Hunter & Nomad
Total scores	10	10	

The Eliminator

- Winners: Kim and Lincoln

Incidents

- Gauntlet: Kim ran at Bionica and put her hands on Bionica's battle stick. She would have been disqualified for pushing Bionica out of the way. But Bill Harrigan and John Forsyth couldn't figure out if she actually did. So she was awarded the points.
- Gauntlet: Thunder pushed Lincoln after the whistle into a camera operator and was yellow carded.
- Gauntlet: Tank also pushed Nikolai outside his zone and was disqualified, awarding Nikolai 10 penalty points.
- The Wall/Eliminator: Nikolai picked up an injury on the wall but was cleared to run the eliminator. However, it didn't make much difference to the outcome.

=== Heat 7 ===
Female

Events	Michelle	Michaela	Gladiators
Gauntlet	10	0	Bionica, Olympia, Destiny, Viper, Amazon
Duel	0	0	Destiny & Amazon
Pendulum	0	0	Angel & Nitro
Pyramid	10 - Foul on Viper	0	Viper & Olympia
Total scores	20	0	

Male

Events	James	Simon	Gladiators
Gauntlet	0 - Foul on Thunder	0 - Foul & Warning on Challenger	Outlaw, Tank, Kouta, Hunter, Thunder
Duel	0	0	Kouta & Tank
Pendulum	10 - Foul On Nomad	10	Nomad & Hunter
Pyramid	0 - James Injured	0	Scar & Outlaw
Total scores	20	10	

The Eliminator

- Winners: Simon and Michaela

Incidents

- Gauntlet: James cleared the gauntlet with more than 2 seconds left which would have earned him five points. But Thunder held him down with his bare hands instead of the battle stick which awarded James an extra five points for a total of 10 for this event. Thunder was disqualified for this run.
- Gauntlet: Simon pushed Thunder after the whistle. As a result, he got a yellow card. If he got a red card, James would win automatically without a challenger replacement.
- Pendulum: Nomad used a scissor takedown like in Hang Tough, which you can't do as a gladiator on the pendulum. You can only take the tag. Ten points were awarded to James.
- Pyramid: Viper did not release Michelle at the bottom of the pyramid and was disqualified. 10 points to Michelle.
- Pyramid: James suffered a shoulder injury against Scar on the pyramid. He couldn't carry on and had to forefit the competition without a replacement. Meaning Simon could not run the eliminator.

=== Heat 8 ===
Female

Events	Kristine	Jessica	Gladiators
Suspension Bridge	0	0	Viper & Amazon
Powerball	2	4	Bionica, Olympia, Nitro
Hang Tough	0	10	Angel & Nitro
Atlaspheres	2	6	Bionica & Destiny
Total scores	4	20	

Male

Events	Paul	Hayden	Gladiators
Suspension Bridge	0	0	Kouta & Tank
Powerball	0	6	Kouta, Tank, Outlaw
Hang Tough	0	0	Hunter & Outlaw
Atlaspheres	6 - Thunder Ejected	4	Scar & Thunder
Total scores	6	10	

The Eliminator

- Winners: Paul and Kristine

Incidents

- Powerball: Paul picked up a ball from the floor instead of the side basket when he placed it in a pod. That score did not count.
- Atlaspheres: Thunder pushed Hayden inside of his atlasphere after Zoe interviewed Hayden, and Thunder raged. Bill warned him, and Scar tried to calm him down. But Thunder ate the yellow card and got ejected.

=== Quarter-Final 1 ===
Female

Events	Nicole	Natasha	Gladiators
Pendulum	0	0	Olympia & Nitro
Whiplash	0	0	Amazon & Destiny
Gauntlet	10	10	Bionica, Olympia, Viper, Nitro, Amazon
The Wall	0	10	Nitro & Angel
Total scores	10	20	

Male

Events	Damien	Nick	Gladiators
Pendulum	0	10	Outlaw & Hunter
Whiplash	10	0 - Foul on Challenger	Tank & Thunder
Gauntlet	5	10 - Foul on Scar	Tank, Nomad, Kouta, Scar, Thunder
The Wall	5	10	Scar & Outlaw
Total scores	20	30	

The Eliminator

- Winners: Natasha and Nick

Incidents

- Whiplash: Nick held the dogbone with two hands and was disqualified.
- Gauntlet: Scar tackled Nick outside his zone and was disqualified giving Nick ten penalty points.

=== Quarter-Final 2 ===
Female

Events	Georgie	Ashleigh	Gladiators
Atlaspheres	0	2	Bionica & Destiny
Vertigo	0	0	Olympia & Angel
Suspension Bridge	10 - Foul On Amazon	10 - Foul On Destiny	Amazon & Destiny
Pyramid	10	0	Viper & Nitro
Total scores	20	12	

Male

Events	Nathan	Phillip	Gladiators
Atlaspheres	4	4	Kouta & Hunter
Vertigo	10	10	Scar & Hunter
Suspension Bridge	0	0	Tank & Thunder
Pyramid	0	0	Kouta & Outlaw
Total scores	14	14	

The Eliminator

- Winners: Georgie and Phillip

Incidents

- Atlaspheres: Georgie was in the blue ball and Ashleigh was in the red ball at Bionica's request.
- Suspension Bridge: Amazon was supposed to attack. The challenger was supposed to attack. Amazon did not attack at all and was once again disqualified from the match against Georgie.
- Suspension Bridge: Destiny took her hands off her own hammerhead and used Ashleigh's hammerhead to remain balanced. Destiny was also disqualified.

=== Quarter-Final 3 ===
Female

Events	Kim	Jacquie	Gladiators
Gauntlet	0 - Foul On Challenger	5	Bionica, Olympia, Destiny, Viper, Amazon
Hang Tough	5	0	Angel & Nitro
Powerball	8	0	Viper, Bionica, Olympia
Sumo Ball	0 - Foul On Challenger	0	Amazon & Destiny
Total scores	13	5	

Male

Events	Joe	Lincoln	Gladiators
Gauntlet	0 - Warning On Thunder	5	Tank, Nomad, Kouta, Hunter, Thunder
Hang Tough	5	0	Outlaw & Hunter
Powerball	6 - Foul On Nomad	4 - Foul On Nomad	Scar, Kouta, Nomad
Sumo Ball	0	0	Tank & Thunder
Total scores	11	9	

The Eliminator

- Winners: Joe and Jacqueline

Incidents

- Gauntlet: Kim again ran into Bionica and pushed her out of the way, but this time she was disqualified.
- Gauntlet: Joe was pushed into a camera operator, causing a stoppage. No penalty points are awarded when there is a stoppage, giving a yellow card.
- Powerball: Nomad tackled both Joe and Lincoln in the safety zone awarding two points to each of them. Also, Lincoln went to the same side twice so the ball didn't count.
- Sumo Ball: Kim put her hand on the platform in Sumo Ball which meant disqualification again.

=== Quarter-Final 4 ===
Male

Events	Simon	Paul	Gladiators
Hit & Run	4	10	Kouta, Nomad, Scar, Outlaw
The Wall	5	10	Hunter & Outlaw
Duel	0	0	Tank & Thunder
Pyramid	0	10	Nomad & Kouta
Total scores	9	30	

Female

Events	Kristine	Michaela	Gladiators
Hit & Run	8	10	Bionica, Olympia, Angel, Destiny
The Wall	0	0	Nitro & Angel
Duel	5	0 - Foul On Challenger	Destiny & Viper
Pyramid	0	0	Amazon & Bionica
Total scores	23	10	

The Eliminator

- Winners: Michaela and Paul

Incidents

- Hit & Run: Kristine called Amazon Arrogant and as a result, Amazon got mad and wanted to face her on Pyramid instead of face Michaela on Duel.
- Duel: Michaela stepped onto Viper's podium and was disqualified.
- Duel: Paul did false start against Tank, but it didn't matter as he was knocked out.

=== Semi-Final 1 ===
Male

Events	Nick	Phillip	Gladiators
Vertigo	10	0	Scar & Hunter
Suspension Bridge	10 - Foul On Thunder	10 - Missed Disqualification On Challenger	Thunder & Tank
Powerball	0	8	Kouta, Nomad, Outlaw
The Wall	10	5	Outlaw & Hunter
Total scores	30	23	

Female

Events	Natasha	Georgie	Gladiators
Vertigo	0	0	Nitro & Olympia
Suspension Bridge	0 - Foul On Challenger	0	Destiny & Amazon
Powerball	10 - Foul On Bionica	2	Olympia, Viper, Bionica
The Wall	0	0	Nitro & Angel
Total scores	10	2	

The Eliminator

- Winners: Nick and Natasha

Incidents

- Suspension Bridge: Natasha pushed Destiny off the bridge with her hammerhead and was disqualified.
- Suspension Bridge: Thunder pushed Nick off the bridge with his hammerhead and was disqualified and Nick got ten penalty points.
- Suspension Bridge: Phillip would have been disqualified by kneeling on the bridge, but Tank didn't challenge in time, and the ten points stood. Phillip also could have been given a yellow card for fighting with Tank.
- Powerball: There was no stoppage when Bionica gave Natasha a high tackle, and she was awarded two penalty points.
- Powerball: Nick placed a blue ball in a pod after the final whistle from John Forsyth and another one after he was tackled, so the balls did not count.

=== Semi-Final 2 ===
Male

Events	Joe	Paul	Gladiators
Pendulum	0	0	Hunter & Outlaw
Gauntlet	5	0	Scar, Nomad, Kouta, Outlaw, Tank
Duel	10 - Foul On Kouta	10 - Foul On Thunder	Kouta & Thunder
Whiplash	0	0	Tank & Scar
Total scores	15	10	

Female

Events	Jacquie	Michaela	Gladiators
Pendulum	10	0	Angel & Nitro
Gauntlet	0	0	Bionica, Olympia, Destiny, Viper, Amazon
Duel	0	5	Viper & Destiny
Whiplash	10	0 - Foul On Challenger	Bionica & Amazon
Total scores	20	5	

The Eliminator

- Winners: Paul and Jacqueline

Incidents

- Duel: Kouta stepped onto Joe's podium and was disqualified. Joe was awarded ten points.
- Duel: Thunder had a false start against Paul, was disqualified, and given a yellow card. Paul also got ten points.
- Whiplash: Michaela held the dogbone with two hands and was disqualified.

=== Grand Final ===
Male

Events	Nick	Paul	Gladiators
Gauntlet	0 - Missed Warning On Challenger	5	Tank, Nomad, Kouta, Scar, Thunder
Hang Tough	0	0	Outlaw & Hunter
Sumo Ball	0	0	Thunder & Tank
Pyramid	0	0	Outlaw & Kouta
Total scores	0	5	

Female

Events	Natasha	Jacquie	Gladiators
Gauntlet	0	0	Bionica, Nitro, Destiny, Viper, Amazon
Hang Tough	5	0	Nitro & Angel
Sumo Ball	0	10	Amazon & Destiny
Pyramid	0	0	Olympia & Viper
Total scores	5	10	

The Eliminator

- Champions: Paul and Natasha

Incidents

- Gauntlet: Nick retaliated against Thunder from behind after the whistle went. He was supposed to receive a yellow card, but Bill Harrigan and John Forsyth forgot to issue it.
- Eliminator: This is the only time the men's eliminator had a record broken. Paul Baird won the eliminator with a record of 52 seconds.

== Gladiators ==
=== Male ===
- Hunter - Zach Kozyrski (WA)
- Kouta - Anthony Koutoufides (VIC)
- Nomad - Ali Ahmadi (SA By way of exile from AFG)
- Outlaw - Jackson Mullane (NSW)
- Scar - Michael Gore (VIC/WA)
- Tank - Bobby Tuimaualuga (WS)
- Thunder - Derek Boyer (QLD by way of FJI)

=== Female ===
- Amazon - Shari Onley (NSW)
- Angel - Tiffiny Hall (VIC)
- Bionica - Stephanie Lethborg (WA)
- Destiny - Karen Harding (QLD)
- Nitro - Hayley Bateup (QLD)
- Olympia - Tatiana Grigorieva (QLD)
- Viper - Sarah Howett (VIC)

== Events ==
- Atlasphere
- Duel
- Gauntlet
- Hang Tough
- Hit & Run
- Pendulum
- Powerball
- Pyramid
- Sumo Ball
- Suspension Bridge
- The Wall
- Vertigo
- Whiplash
- Eliminator

== Development ==
In early 2007, an episode of the television series Where Are They Now? featured some of the original Gladiators as special guests. The Seven Network used this segment as research towards reviving the show depending on viewer numbers for the episode as well as if the ratings fell after the end of the segment.

Once the gladiators and challengers had been chosen by producers and head strength & conditioning coach Chief Brabon, filming of all the episodes for season four took place from 6 January 2008 to 10 February 2008 at The Dome, Sydney Showground, New South Wales.

Speculation around who was going to host the new series was evident, with many reports in the media about celebrities which have either successfully or unsuccessfully auditioned. Seven Network presenter Tom Williams was reportedly the only male who was auditioned, and was picked up for the male co-host role immediately. For the female co-host role, the process was more intense, with many females auditioning, including swimmers Elka Graham and Brooke Hanson as well as actors Zoe Ventoura and Samantha Noble. On 18 December 2007, it was reported in the media that former McLeod's Daughters actor Zoe Naylor was being seriously considered as the female host, with an insider stating that "She looked amazing in the screen tests and there was a great vibe between her and Tom. She's fresh and fun." She ultimately ended up being chosen for the female co-host position.

With new Gladiators being chosen for the new series, it was reported on 30 December 2007 that former Australian rules footballer Anthony Koutoufides and Olympic Pole vaulter Tatiana Grigorieva were two of the new gladiators for the new series, but the Seven Network refused to confirm the selections, even though these reports ended up being true. Strongman Derek Boyer is the third celebrity to be picked up as a Gladiator, followed by former ironwoman Hayley Bateup being the fourth. The other ten Gladiators have a non-public background. This show did help Tiffiny Hall become a celebrity as Angel was regarded as the most popular Gladiator on the show. Zach Kozyrski would eventually become noteworthy to Survivor fans for going onto Australian Survivor, but not as a gladiator alone.

== Ratings ==
No.	Title	Air date	Overnight ratings		Ref(s)
No.	Title	Air date	Viewers	Rank	Ref(s)
1	Episode 1	30 March 2008	1,847,000	1	
2	Episode 2	6 April 2008	1,571,000	1	
3	Episode 3	13 April 2008	1,427,000	6	
4	Episode 4	20 April 2008	1,560,000	3	
5	Episode 5	27 April 2008	1,366,000	7	
6	Episode 6	4 May 2008	1,276,000	6	
7	Episode 7	11 May 2008	1,294,000	6	
8	Episode 8	18 May 2008	1,379,000 (Note: Not aired in Adelaide due to AFL coverage)	4	
9	Episode 9	25 May 2008	1,262,000	6	
10	Episode 10	1 June 2008	1,229,000 (Note: Shown at 7:00-8:00pm in Adelaide due to AFL coverage)	8	
11	Episode 11	8 June 2008	1,035,000 (Note: Shown in a different timeslot in Adelaide due to AFL coverage)	9	
12	Episode 12	15 June 2008	1,254,000	10	
13	Episode 13	22 June 2008	1,264,000	7	
14	Episode 14	29 June 2008	1,020,000	11	
15	Episode 15	6 July 2008	1,258,000	6	

== See also ==
- Gladiators (2024 Australian TV series)
