= Orange Roughies =

- Genre: Action; Crime; Thriller
- Created by: Rod Johns & Scott McJorrow
- Starring: Nicholas Coghlan; Zoe Naylor; Mark Ruka; Caroline Craig; Stephen Hall; Nick Kemplen
- Country of origin: New Zealand
- Original language: English
- No. of seasons: 2
- No. of episodes: 19 (list of episodes)

Production
- Production location: Auckland, New Zealand
- Running time: 60 minutes
- Production company: Screenworks

Original release
- Network: TV One
- Release: May 25, 2006 – February 11, 2008

Orange Roughies is a New Zealand television drama created by Auckland-based film company Screenworks, the first season of which was screened on TV ONE from May to July 2006. The second season was due to be shown some time between October 2006 and January 2007, but due to poor ratings the programme was taken off the air.

An orange roughy, Hoplostethus atlanticus is a type of fish.

== About the show ==
The show centres around four main characters who are members of an elite taskforce in Auckland combining police and customs officers. Despite being an elite force, they are, as their commander Ron Maddock (Stephen Hall) remind them, underfunded, under-resourced and under the hammer. Because of this the Roughies (as they are called) have to make sure that they perform exceptionally well to avoid being canned, as they are, after all, an experiment. The Roughies are Detective Sergeant Danny Wilder (Nicholas Coghlan), Senior Customs Officer Jane Durant (Zoe Naylor), Detective Constable Zach Wiki (Mark Ruka) and Noel Bullerton (Nick Kemplen).

Each episode concerns a police or customs enquiry carried out by the taskforce, often of a high-risk nature.

The first episode deals with child trafficking from China. Jane decides to adopt one of the trafficked children, Tao Li, but several episodes later Tao is taken back to China, leaving Jane once again childless. There is also a romance that gradually develops between Danny and Jane, culminating in a kiss discovered by Maddock.

The first season ends with Jane being taken hostage by a homosexual Greek criminal and being shot in the stomach. It is uncertain whether she survives. Danny manages to track down the shooter in Melbourne and kills him.

== Cast ==
=== Primary ===
- Nicholas Coghlan as Detective Sergeant Danny Wilder
- Zoe Naylor as Jane Durrant
- Mark Ruka as Zack Wiki
- Caroline Craig as Chloe Meachen
- Stephen Hall as Ron Maddock
- Nick Kemplen as Noel Bullerton.

=== Secondary ===
- Nicole Whippy as Donna Wiki, Zack's wife and a nurse at the local hospital
- Roy Snow as Denis Fielding, Jane's flatmate
- Olivia James-Baird as Sophie Wilder, Danny's daughter
- William Wallace as Tom Bowden
- Sean Duffy as Paul Grayson
- Blair Strang as DS Sean Parkes
- Kimberley Ooi as Tao Li
- Peter Daube as David Chambers
- Stephen Butterworth as George "Sugarplum" Economou
- Andrew Robertt as Leo Sullivan

=== Guest ===
- Ingrid Park as Helen Moore
- Katherine Kennard as Maria Hanniford
- Josephine Davison as Jackie Sullivan
- Toni Potter as Cheryl Bowden

== Music ==
The soundtrack for Orange Roughies was composed mostly by Don McGlashan, who also wrote the music for Screenworks' other major television series, Street Legal. However, the opening credits are accompanied by the song Long White Cross performed by an Auckland band, Pluto.

== Locations ==
Orange Roughies was shot in the central business district of Auckland CBD. Locations included:

- police station with firearm storage - AUT University Design Building, Studio Entrance
- airport arrival hall - AUT University Administration Building (WA) foyer, Conference Centre
- airport Customs office - AUT University Administration Building (WA), security control room
- cutaway scene at bus station - Britomart Terminus
- party on boat - City Viaduct, close to ferry terminal.
