= Country GP =

1984–85 New Zealand television series

- Created by: Jane Galletly; Peter Hill; Stephen McElrea
- Country of origin: New Zealand
- Original language: English
- No. of seasons: 1
- No. of episodes: 66

Production
- Producer: Stephen McElrea
- Running time: 50 minutes

Original release
- Release: February 20, 1984 – July 15, 1985

Country GP is a New Zealand television series that aired on One beginning in 1984. In 1945 Dr David Miller moves into a small south Island town as their new doctor. It is set in the fictional town of Masons Valley with exterior sets for the town built in Hutt Valley.

== Cast ==
- Larney Tupu as David Miller
- Glenis Levestam as Evelyn Dalgleish
- Bruce Phillips as Richard Dalgleish
- Sarah Davison as Fiona Dalgleish
- May Lloyd as Brenda Duffield

== Reception ==
Country GP averaged around 35th in the ratings but jumped into the top ten for its finale. Its first year saw a consistent 700,000 viewers.

Ken Strongman in The Press wrote "For a few moments, the action is absorbing and then credibility is dashed. One is there, in the box, lost in the characters, and then, suddenly, one is back, nearly asleep on the settee."
