= Gladiators (2024 Australian TV series) =

Australian television game show

- Genre: Sports entertainment
- Created by: Dan Carr; John Ferraro
- Based on: Gladiators by Dan Carr and John Ferraro
- Presented by: Beau Ryan; Liz Ellis
- Starring: Hammer
- Announcer: Matt Russell
- Country of origin: Australia
- Original language: English
- No. of series: 1
- No. of episodes: 12

Production
- Executive producers: John Ferraro; Barry Poznick
- Camera setup: Multi-camera
- Production company: Warner Bros. International Television Production

Original release
- Network: Network 10
- Release: 15 January – 28 January 2024

Related
- Gladiators (1995–1996); Gladiators (2008)

Gladiators (also known as Gladiators Australia) is an Australian television series, which premiered on 15 January 2024 on Network 10. It is hosted by Beau Ryan and Liz Ellis. It is based on the earlier Australian iterations of the American version of the franchise. The first iteration being broadcast from 1995–1996 and a short-lived revival being the second in 2008.

The referee of the show is the former Australian Gladiator and rugby league player, Mark McGaw, also known as "Hammer". Casting for contenders for the first series began in August 2023 and the twelve "Gladiators" were announced on 26 September 2023. In May 2024, it was officially announced that Gladiators is being cancelled after only one season, that failed to find an audience.

== Production ==
The second possible revival of the Australian version of Gladiators was rumoured to be produced soon after the second British revival was announced. Casting for contenders to compete against the Gladiators was announced in August, and it was revealed that the show would air in early 2024 on Network 10. Distribution rights are held by Amazon MGM Studios Distribution, with the show being executively produced by John C. Ferraro and Barry Poznick. The episodes were filmed at Disney Studios Australia in Sydney, New South Wales.

The series was initially announced as premiering on 7 January 2024, within the summer non-ratings period; however, one month prior to the premiere, it was postponed by a day. It was later announced that the series would instead premiere on 15 January 2024, to enable a wider audience to view the revival series.

=== Marketing ===
The series was announced to air in early 2024. It is sponsored by a wide range of companies, including QSR International and auto home delivery services, and will include "back-to-school" marketing. Similar to the original series, it is a comedic sports entertainment show with "cartoon-ish violence" for a family audience.

The first official teaser trailer for the series was released on 6 November 2023, featuring eight of the Gladiators of the show (females Arrow, Chaos, Comet, Halo, and males Cyclone, Phoenix, Spartan and Viking).

== Format ==
The show involves permanent competitors known as "Gladiators" that compete against "Contenders" (formerly called "Challengers") in several events made to test out both their physical and mental capabilities.

In each episode, two men and two women compete for points against the Gladiators across four different events, with separate events for males and females. After this, each pair then competes against each other in "The Eliminator", a grueling obstacle course, of which any points they have won previously go towards time for a head start on their opponent. The winner of this is dubbed the champion of the episode, and will advance to the Finals, in hope to be crowned as the overall champions.

The winners of the series had the opportunity to become a Gladiator in the next series of the show and face off against new challengers, though there was never going to be another series.

== Events ==
On the show, the Challengers will face the Gladiators in events testing their speed, strength, stamina, agility and power. The series sees the return of some classic events, with a few brand-new events. Each episode featured four events chosen at random, with every episode finishing with The Eliminator obstacle course.

In the first series, the following events were introduced in this order:

- In the Heats, events Duel, Powerball, Pyramid and The Wall were played with a rotation.
- In the Quarter-Finals, two new events, Tilt and Hang Tough were introduced.
- In the Semi-Finals, new events Whiplash and The Edge premiered.

=== The Edge ===
The Edge is a brand new event in Gladiators Australia, in which the challenger goes head-to-head against one gladiator in a criss-cross-shaped platform 5 metres above the arena floor. The challenger must make it to the other side without being knocked off the Edge by the gladiator. Each cross is worth a point.

The game is based on the British event with the same name.

=== The Eliminator ===
The final Eliminator obstacle course includes nine different obstacles:

1. Over-under bars
2. Balance beams (The grand final also featured the seesaw)
3. Six meter rope climb (No platform in the grand final)
4. Hand ladders
5. Climbing up and down the Pyramid
6. Cargo net climb
7. Fire pole dismount
8. Travelator
9. Through the "foam brick" wall

== Gladiators ==
The 12 Australian and New Zealander athletes, appearing as Gladiators, were announced on 26 September 2023.

However, in November 2023, it was revealed that a seventh male Gladiator would appear on the show. Named "Dragon", light heavyweight mixed martial artist Tyson Pedro was revealed. Black Ops—real name Bertrand Venail—was also revealed during the airing of the series – bringing the total to 14 Gladiators.

The grand prize for the winners of the season, Kalani Lenehan and Taylah Bisshopp, was the title of Gladiator.

Female Gladiators
| Alias | Name | Age | Stats | State | Biography |
|---|---|---|---|---|---|
| Arrow | Harriet Roberts | 31 | 170 cm (5 ft 7 in); 74 kg (163 lb) | QLD | CrossFit Games athlete and gymnastic coach |
| Chaos | Jaymi-Lee Morris | 30 | 164 cm (5 ft 5 in); 82 kg (181 lb) | NSW | Bodybuilder and powerlifter |
| Comet | Tatyanna Pogonza-Dumas | 24 | 170 cm (5 ft 7 in); 65 kg (143 lb) | NSW | Basketball player, sports model and two-time Ninja Warrior |
| Elektra | Alethea Boon | 39 | 161 cm (5 ft 3 in); 64 kg (141 lb) | NSW | CrossFit Games and Commonwealth Games athlete |
| Halo | Chanique Greyling | 30 | 179 cm (5 ft 10 in); 68 kg (150 lb) | NSW | Hollywood stuntwoman, model and mixed martial artist |
| Raven | Katelin van Zyl | 31 | 173 cm (5 ft 8 in); 67 kg (148 lb) | QLD | CrossFit Games athlete and former Australian field hockey player |

Male Gladiators
| Alias | Name | Age | Stats | State | Biography |
|---|---|---|---|---|---|
| Black Ops | Bertrand Venail | 36 | N/a | NSW | Former football player and F45 trainer |
| Cobra | Damien Rider | 48 | 190 cm (6 ft 3 in); 95 kg (209 lb) | SA | Athlete, extreme adventurer and TED speaker |
| Cyclone | Blessings Chilufya | 22 | 191 cm (6 ft 3 in); 104 kg (229 lb) | QLD | Fitness coach |
| Dragon | Tyson Pedro | 31 | 188 cm (6 ft 2 in); 99 kg (218 lb) | NSW | UFC mixed martial artist |
| Maximus | Kwame Duah | 30 | 178 cm (5 ft 10 in); 108 kg (238 lb) | SA | Bodybuilder and influencer |
| Phoenix | Sandor Earl | 33 | 192 cm (6 ft 4 in); 105 kg (231 lb) | NSW | Former NRL player for New Zealand |
| Spartan | Khan Porter | 33 | 182 cm (6 ft 0 in); 92 kg (203 lb) | NSW | CrossFit Games athlete |
| Viking | Jett Kenny | 30 | 188 cm (6 ft 2 in); 93 kg (205 lb) | QLD | Australian ironman, television personality and model |

== Episodes ==
| Episode | Contest | Original airdate | Challengers (Female) | Challengers (Male) | Events |
|---|---|---|---|---|---|
| 1 | Heat 1 | 15 January 2024 | Ana v Makedonka | Jonny v Ben/Kurt (Note: Ben got injured in Powerball, so he was replaced by reserve challenger Kurt.) | Duel, Powerball, The Wall, Pyramid |
| 2 | Heat 2 | 16 January 2024 | Taylah v Caitlin | Chris v Alex | Powerball, Duel, Pyramid, The Wall |
| 3 | Heat 3 | 17 January 2024 | Tee v Yani | Zak/Danny (Note: Zak got injured in Duel, so he was replaced by reserve challenger Danny.) v Chris | The Wall, Duel, Powerball, Pyramid |
| 4 | Heat 4 | 18 January 2024 | Julia v Emilia/Bec (Note: Emilia got injured in Pyramid, so she was replaced by reserve challenger Bec.) | Leo/Daine (Note: Leo got injured in The Wall, so he was replaced by reserve challenger Daine.) v Dan | Powerball, Duel, Pyramid, The Wall |
| 5 | Heat 5 | 19 January 2024 | Sam v Rachelle | Kalani v Torey | Duel, Powerball, Pyramid, The Wall |
| 6 | Heat 6 | 21 January 2024 | Michelle v Janice | Jason v Sohrab | The Wall, Duel, Powerball, Pyramid |
| 7 | Quarter Final 1 | 22 January 2024 | Tee v Julia | Jason v Chris | Pyramid, Tilt, Hang Tough, The Wall |
| 8 | Quarter Final 2 | 23 January 2024 | Makedonka v Janice | Jonny v Kalani | Hang Tough, Tilt, Pyramid, The Wall |
| 9 | Quarter Final 3 | 24 January 2024 | Taylah v Sam | Daine v Danny | Tilt, Hang Tough, The Wall, Pyramid |
| 10 | Semi Final 1 | 25 January 2024 | Taylah v Tee | Daine v Chris | The Edge, Pyramid, Whiplash, The Wall/Duel |
| 11 | Semi Final 2 | 26 January 2024 | Janice v Julia (wildcard) | Kalani v Jason (wildcard) | The Edge, The Wall, Duel, Pyramid, Whiplash |
| 12 | Grand Final | 28 January 2024 | Taylah v Janice | Daine v Kalani | Hang Tough, The Wall, The Edge, Pyramid |

=== Episode summary ===
In the final eliminator round, each point is equal to 0.5 second head start for the leading challenger.

==== Heat 1 ====
Female

| Events | Ana | Makedonka | Gladiators |
|---|---|---|---|
| Duel | 0 | 0 | Chaos |
| Powerball | 1 | 0 | Arrow, Chaos, Elektra |
| The Wall | 5 | 0 | Halo & Elektra |
| Pyramid | 0 | 0 | Halo & Arrow |
| Total scores | 6 | 0 | |

Male

| Events | Jonny | Ben/Kurt | Gladiators |
|---|---|---|---|
| Duel | 0 | 0 | Phoenix |
| Powerball | 1 | 2 | Cobra, Phoenix, Spartan |
| The Wall | 0 | 0 | Spartan & Cobra |
| Pyramid | 0 | 0 | Cyclone & Phoenix |
| Total scores | 1 | 2 | |

The Eliminator

- Winners: Makedonka and Jonny

==== Heat 2 ====
Female

| Events | Taylah | Caitlin | Gladiators |
|---|---|---|---|
| Powerball | 7 | 2 | Chaos, Elektra, Arrow |
| Duel | 0 | 0 | Halo |
| Pyramid | 0 | 5 | Halo & Elektra |
| The Wall | 0 | 0 | Elektra & Arrow |
| Total scores | 7 | 7 | |

Male

| Events | Chris | Alex | Gladiators |
|---|---|---|---|
| Powerball | 3 | 5 | Cobra, Viking, Cyclone |
| Duel | 0 | 0 | Phoenix |
| Pyramid | 5 | 0 | Cobra & Spartan |
| The Wall | 0 | 10 | Cobra & Phoenix |
| Total scores | 8 | 15 | |

The Eliminator

- Winners: Taylah and Chris

==== Heat 3 ====
Female

| Events | Tee | Yani | Gladiators |
|---|---|---|---|
| The Wall | 10 | 5 | Halo & Elektra |
| Duel | 5 | 0 | Chaos |
| Powerball | 5 | 4 | Arrow, Elektra, Halo |
| Pyramid | 10 | 0 | Arrow & Chaos |
| Total scores | 30 | 9 | |

Male

| Events | Zak/Danny | Chris | Gladiators |
|---|---|---|---|
| The Wall | 10 | 5 | Spartan & Black Ops |
| Duel | 0 | 0 | Phoenix |
| Powerball | 5 | 4 | Cobra, Phoenix, Spartan |
| Pyramid | 5 | 0 | Cobra & Spartan |
| Total scores | 20 | 9 | |

The Eliminator

- Winners: Tee and Danny

==== Heat 4 ====
Female

| Events | Julia | Emilia/Bec | Gladiators |
|---|---|---|---|
| Powerball | 2 | 2 | Chaos, Arrow, Comet |
| Duel | 10 | 5 | Chaos |
| Pyramid | 0 | 10 | Arrow & Halo |
| The Wall | 0 | 0 | Elektra & Comet |
| Total scores | 12 | 17 | |

Male

| Events | Leo/Daine | Dan | Gladiators |
|---|---|---|---|
| Powerball | 4 | 3 | Viking, Phoenix, Cyclone |
| Duel | 5 | 0 | Spartan |
| Pyramid | 10 | 0 | Cobra & Cyclone |
| The Wall | 0 | 10 | Viking & Spartan |
| Total scores | 19 | 13 | |

The Eliminator

- Winners: Julia and Daine

==== Heat 5 ====
Female

| Events | Sam | Rachelle | Gladiators |
|---|---|---|---|
| Duel | 0 | 0 | Raven |
| Powerball | 2 | 0 | Comet, Arrow, Chaos |
| Pyramid | 0 | 0 | Halo & Elektra |
| The Wall | 5 | 10 | Raven & Elektra |
| Total scores | 7 | 10 | |

Male

| Events | Kalani | Torey | Gladiators |
|---|---|---|---|
| Duel | 0 | 0 | Maximus |
| Powerball | 3 | 7 | Spartan, Phoenix, Maximus |
| Pyramid | 5 | 0 | Cyclone & Phoenix |
| The Wall | 10 | 0 | Cobra & Black Ops |
| Total scores | 18 | 7 | |

The Eliminator

- Winners: Sam and Kalani

==== Heat 6 ====
Female

| Events | Michelle | Janice | Gladiators |
|---|---|---|---|
| The Wall | 10 | 0 | Comet & Elektra |
| Duel | 0 | 0 | Halo |
| Powerball | 3 | 1 | Arrow, Raven, Chaos |
| Pyramid | 0 | 0 | Comet & Raven |
| Total scores | 13 | 1 | |

Male

| Events | Jason | Sohrab | Gladiators |
|---|---|---|---|
| The Wall | 10 | 0 | Black Ops & Cobra |
| Duel | 10 | 0 | Phoenix |
| Powerball | 3 | 2 | Phoenix, Spartan, Maximus |
| Pyramid | 5 | 5 | Cyclone & Cobra |
| Total scores | 28 | 7 | |

The Eliminator

- Winners: Janice and Jason

==== Quarter Final 1 ====
Female

| Events | Tee | Julia | Gladiators |
|---|---|---|---|
| Pyramid | 10 | 0 | Arrow & Comet |
| Tilt | 5 | 0 | Elektra & Chaos |
| Hang Tough | 0 | 5 | Raven & Halo |
| The Wall | 10 | 5 | Raven & Elektra |
| Total scores | 25 | 10 | |

Male

| Events | Jason | Chris | Gladiators |
|---|---|---|---|
| Pyramid | 0 | 0 | Dragon & Cyclone |
| Tilt | 5 | 0 | Phoenix & Maximus |
| Hang Tough | 5 | 5 | Dragon & Spartan |
| The Wall | 10 | 5 | Phoenix & Cobra |
| Total scores | 20 | 10 | |

The Eliminator

- Winners: Tee and Chris

==== Quarter Final 2 ====
Female

| Events | Makedonka | Janice | Gladiators |
|---|---|---|---|
| Hang Tough | 5 | 0 | Comet & Halo |
| Tilt | 0 | 0 | Elektra & Arrow |
| Pyramid | 10 | 0 | Raven & Chaos |
| The Wall | 0 | 10 | Comet & Arrow |
| Total scores | 15 | 10 | |

| Events | Jonny | Kalani | Gladiators |
|---|---|---|---|
| Hang Tough | 0 | 5 | Spartan & Cobra |
| Tilt | 0 | 0 | Maximus & Dragon |
| Pyramid | 0 | 5 | Maximus & Phoenix |
| The Wall | 0 | 10 | Spartan & Cobra |
| Total scores | 0 | 20 | |

The Eliminator

- Winners: Janice and Kalani

==== Quarter Final 3 ====
Female

| Events | Taylah | Sam | Gladiators |
|---|---|---|---|
| Tilt | 0 | 0 | Strongwoman |
| Hang Tough | 0 | 0 | Raven & Elektra |
| The Wall | 0 | 0 | Comet & Arrow |
| Pyramid | 0 | 0 | Halo & Chaos |
| Total scores | 0 | 0 | |

Male

| Events | Daine | Danny | Gladiators |
|---|---|---|---|
| Tilt | 5 | 0 | Strongman |
| Hang Tough | 0 | 5 | Dragon & Spartan |
| The Wall | 10 | 0 | Phoenix & Cobra |
| Pyramid | 10 | 5 | Maximus & Cyclone |
| Total scores | 25 | 10 | |

The Eliminator

- Winners: Taylah and Daine

==== Semi Final 1 ====
Female

| Events | Taylah | Tee | Gladiators |
|---|---|---|---|
| The Edge | 4 | 2 | Elektra & Raven |
| Pyramid | 0 | 0 | Comet & Arrow |
| Whiplash | 10 | 10 | Chaos & Comet |
| The Wall | 0 | 10 | Arrow & Elektra |
| Total scores | 14 | 22 | |

Male

| Events | Daine | Chris | Gladiators |
|---|---|---|---|
| The Edge | 10 | 6 | Cyclone & Spartan |
| Pyramid | 0 | 5 | Maximus & Cyclone |
| Whiplash | 10 | 0 | Spartan & Cobra |
| Duel | 10 | 0 | Dragon |
| Total scores | 30 | 11 | |

The Eliminator

- Winners: Taylah and Daine

==== Semi Final 2 ====
Female

| Events | Janice | Julia | Gladiators |
|---|---|---|---|
| The Edge | 3 | 0 | Elektra & Halo |
| The Wall | 10 | 0 | Arrow & Raven |
| Duel | 0 | 0 | Chaos & Comet |
| Pyramid | 0 | 0 | Halo & Arrow |
| Whiplash | 0 | 10 | Elektra & Comet |
| Total scores | 13 | 10 | |

Male

| Events | Kalani | Jason | Gladiators |
|---|---|---|---|
| The Edge | 5 | 1 | Cyclone & Spartan |
| The Wall | 10 | 0 | Cobra & Dragon |
| Duel | 5 | 0 | Phoenix |
| Pyramid | 10 | 0 | Cyclone & Phoenix |
| Whiplash | 0 | 10 | Black Ops & Maximus |
| Total scores | 30 | 11 | |

The Eliminator

- Winners: Janice and Kalani

==== Grand Final ====
Female

| Events | Taylah | Janice | Gladiators |
|---|---|---|---|
| Hang Tough | 0 | 0 | Halo & Chaos |
| The Wall | 0 | 10 | Comet & Arrow |
| The Edge | 7 | 2 | Elektra & Raven |
| Pyramid | 0 | 5 | Halo & Arrow |
| Total scores | 7 | 17 | |

Male

| Events | Daine | Kalani | Gladiators |
|---|---|---|---|
| Hang Tough | 10 | 5 | Dragon & Cobra |
| The Wall | 0 | 0 | Phoenix & Cobra |
| The Edge | 6 | 9 | Spartan & Cyclone |
| Pyramid | 10 | 5 | Maximus & Cyclone |
| Total scores | 26 | 19 | |

The Eliminator

- Winners: Taylah and Kalani

=== Challenger's progress ===
Color key:

Series champions
Runners-up
The challenger won the episode and advanced
The challenger was medically withdrawn from the competition
The challenger was a wildcard and qualified
The challenger lost the episode and was eliminated

| Challengers | Episodes | | | | | | | | | | | |
| Challengers | Heats | | | | | | Quarter Finals | | | Semi Finals | | Final |
| Challengers | 1 | 2 | 3 | 4 | 5 | 6 | 7 | 8 | 9 | 10 | 11 | 12 |
|---|---|---|---|---|---|---|---|---|---|---|---|---|
| Kalani | —N/a | | | | WIN | —N/a | | WIN | —N/a | | WIN | CHAMPION |
| Taylah | —N/a | WIN | —N/a | | | | | | WIN | WIN | —N/a | CHAMPION |
| Daine | —N/a | | | WIN | —N/a | | | | WIN | WIN | —N/a | RUNNER-UP |
| Janice | —N/a | | | | | WIN | —N/a | WIN | —N/a | | WIN | RUNNER-UP |
| Jason | —N/a | | | | | WIN | WC | —N/a | | | OUT | —N/a |
| Julia | —N/a | | | WIN | —N/a | | WC | —N/a | | | OUT | —N/a |
| Chris | —N/a | WIN | —N/a | | | | WIN | —N/a | | OUT | —N/a | |
| Tee | —N/a | | WIN | —N/a | | | WIN | —N/a | | OUT | —N/a | |
| Danny | —N/a | | WIN | —N/a | | | | | OUT | —N/a | | |
| Sam | —N/a | | | | WIN | —N/a | | | OUT | —N/a | | |
| Jonny | WIN | —N/a | | | | | | OUT | —N/a | | | |
| Makedonka | WIN | —N/a | | | | | | OUT | —N/a | | | |
| Sohrab | —N/a | | | | | OUT | —N/a | | | | | |
| Michelle | —N/a | | | | | OUT | —N/a | | | | | |
| Torey | —N/a | | | | OUT | —N/a | | | | | | |
| Rachelle | —N/a | | | | OUT | —N/a | | | | | | |
| Dan | —N/a | | | OUT | —N/a | | | | | | | |
| Bec | —N/a | | | OUT | —N/a | | | | | | | |
| Leo | —N/a | | | WDR | —N/a | | | | | | | |
| Emilia | —N/a | | | WDR | —N/a | | | | | | | |
| Chris | —N/a | | OUT | —N/a | | | | | | | | |
| Zak | —N/a | | WDR | —N/a | | | | | | | | |
| Yani | —N/a | | OUT | —N/a | | | | | | | | |
| Alex | —N/a | OUT | —N/a | | | | | | | | | |
| Caitlin | —N/a | OUT | —N/a | | | | | | | | | |
| Kurt | OUT | —N/a | | | | | | | | | | |
| Ben | WDR | —N/a | | | | | | | | | | |
| Ana | OUT | —N/a | | | | | | | | | | |

== Reception ==
=== Critical reception ===
The return of Gladiators has received mixed–to–poor critique. The series received a lot of negative comments via social media, relating to the "poor set design", and the slow pacing. The lack of audience and variety of events were also denounced.

=== Ratings ===
Ratings data is from OzTAM and represents the top 20 viewership from the five largest Australian metropolitan centres (Sydney, Melbourne, Brisbane, Adelaide and Perth).

| No. | Title | Air date | Timeslot | Overnight ratings | | Consolidated ratings | | Total viewers | Ref(s) |
| No. | Title | Air date | Timeslot | Viewers | Rank | Viewers | Rank | Total viewers | Ref(s) |
|---|---|---|---|---|---|---|---|---|---|
| 1 | Premiere | 15 January 2024 | Monday 7:30 pm | 395,000 | 8 | —N/a | —N/a | 395,000 | |
| 2 | Episode 2 | 16 January 2024 | Tuesday 7:30 pm | 196,000 | 20 | —N/a | —N/a | 196,000 | |
| 3 | Episode 3 | 17 January 2024 | Wednesday 7:30 pm | 219,000 | 17 | —N/a | —N/a | 219,000 | |
| 4 | Episode 4 | 18 January 2024 | Thursday 7:30 pm | – | NR | —N/a | —N/a | – | |
| 5 | Episode 5 | 19 January 2024 | Friday 7:30 pm | – | NR | —N/a | —N/a | – | |
| 6 | Episode 6 | 21 January 2024 | Sunday 7:30 pm | 176,000 | 16 | —N/a | —N/a | 176,000 | |
| 7 | Episode 7 | 22 January 2024 | Monday 7:30 pm | 161,000 | 20 | —N/a | —N/a | 161,000 | |
| 8 | Episode 8 | 23 January 2024 | Tuesday 7:30 pm | – | NR | —N/a | —N/a | – | |
| 9 | Episode 9 | 24 January 2024 | Wednesday 7:30 pm | – | NR | —N/a | —N/a | – | |
| 10 | Episode 10 | 25 January 2024 | Thursday 7:30 pm | – | NR | —N/a | —N/a | – | |
| 11 | Episode 11 | 26 January 2024 | Friday 7:30 pm | – | NR | —N/a | —N/a | – | |
| 12 | Grand Final | 28 January 2024 | Sunday 7:30 pm | – | NR* | —N/a | —N/a | – | |

NR = Did not rank in Top 20

*From 28 September 2023, OzTAM ratings changed. The Grand Final ranked 21 on the Total TV Overnight Top 30 Programs with a reach of 697,000.
