= Darkness Rising (film) =

- Directed by: Austin Reading
- Written by: Vikram Weet
- Produced by: Julie S. Fuller; Paul Finkel; Marcus Dean Fuller; Daniel Hyman; Jason Potash
- Starring: Tara Holt; Katrina Law; Heather Mazur; Ted Raimi
- Cinematography: Adam Biggs
- Edited by: Robert Bramwell
- Music by: Thomas Gamble
- Distributed by: IFC Midnight
- Release date: June 30, 2017
- Running time: 81 minutes
- Country: United States
- Language: English

Darkness Rising is a 2017 American supernatural horror film directed by Austin Reading.

== Synopsis ==
The film opens with a man playing with his daughter Sarah as a house appears in the distance.

Twenty-five years ago Madison's mother smothered her infant daughter Olivia. Only the intervention of Madison's father saved the girl; however, he reported hearing a voice whispering the number five. Years later Madison returns to her childhood home alongside her boyfriend Jake and her cousin Izzy. Jake is concerned for Madison, as she has recently begun strange behaviors, one of which is writing the number five as slashes.

Once inside the house the trio experience strange supernatural events. When Madison reveals that there have been similar homes that have disappeared after tragic events, the group tries to leave the home but is unsuccessful. Izzy briefly disappears and returns possessed. She tries to kill Madison but is stopped by Jake, who ties Izzy up as she rants. While they are trying to find a way to get help or escape, Jake discovers a photo album containing pictures of Seth, a brother that Madison realizes she couldn't remember. Madison also recalls nightmares of the past and the words that "five must die". She tells Jake that she is pregnant, which is why she wanted to return home. Madison is attacked by Izzy and flees to another room, during which time she is also attacked by other supernatural forces.

When Madison returns to Jake, she discovers that he is possessed and states that the curse will continue. She is forced to defend herself against him, leading to his death. Madison is led by Seth to Izzy, who tells her that three more people must die, after which a door to the other side will open. Realizing that two more people must die, Madison kills Izzy. She is then possessed and experiences a vision of her mother implying that the final death can be the unborn baby. Madison stabs herself to kill the fetus and crawls to the front door. She opens it, but seemingly drops dead in the process. The film then shows the man looking at the house in surprise along with Sarah.

== Cast ==
- Tara Holt as Madison
- Christian Ganiere as Seth
- Bryce Johnson as Jake
- Katrina Law as Izzy
- Heather Mazur as Kate
- Myk Watford as Daniel
- Ted Raimi as Dad

== Reception ==
Frank Scheck for The Hollywood Reporter claimed the film "would be infuriating except that its terminal dullness saps the energy required for outrage." Monica Castillo for The New York Times found that the film had potential but disappointed saying "Austin Reading's horror movie "Darkness Rising" has the makings of a solid haunted-house story...However, tossing these ingredients together does not guarantee a decent scare." Noel Murray of the Los Angeles Times called the film "as blandly forgettable as its title."

Maitland McDonagh for Film Journal International said "Ultimately, the trouble with Darkness Rising isn't that so much it's generic—Robert Wise's The Haunting (1963) is a classic that works with the same basic notes—as that the characters are so undefined that it's impossible to care what happens to them beyond wishing that they'd stop screaming." Matt Boiselle for Dread Central gave the film two stars saying "Overall, I'd recommend Darkness Rising solely to fans of watered-down haunted house flicks, but only if damn near every other watered-down haunted house flick was unavailable to be viewed at that specific time—take a pass." Horrorella for Aint It Cool News called it "a very mixed bag of good intentions, potentially interesting ideas and poor execution."
