= Heather Mazur =

American actress

- Occupation: Actress
- Years active: 1990; 2003–present

Heather Mazur is an American actress, best known for her role as Sarah Cooper in the 1990 film Night of the Living Dead.

== Career ==
Mazur did not act on screen for over ten years after Night of the Living Dead was released, before making a guest appearance in the television series Hack in 2003. Since then she has guest starred in Numb3rs, Joey, CSI: NY, CSI: Miami, Medium, Criminal Minds, Law & Order: LA, The Mentalist, Bones and the J. J. Abrams-produced unsold television pilot Anatomy of Hope. She also had recurring roles in Crash (2008–2009) and Pretty Little Liars (2010–2012). She portrayed Deputy Mayor Eileen Ashby in the soap opera General Hospital from 2021 to March 30, 2023, when she was flung off a bridge by Victor Cassadine.

Her film credits include Over Her Dead Body (2008), the direct-to-video film The Funeral Planner (2010), and A Leading Man (2013). She has also acted on stage.

== Filmography ==
=== Film ===
Year	Title	Role	Notes
1990	Night of the Living Dead	Sarah Cooper	
2008	Over Her Dead Body	Sue	
2010	The Funeral Planner	Maddy Banks	Direct-to-video
2013	A Leading Man	Rachel Cohen	
2016	911 Nightmare	Cortez	
2017	Darkness Rising	Kate	
2017	I'm Not Here	Mom's attorney	
2018	Drive Me to Vegas and Mars	Momma	
2019	Deadly Switch	Zelda	
2026	Street Smart	Jogger Amy	

=== Television ===
Year	Title	Role	Notes
2003	Hack	Rina Lowe	Episode: "Presumed Guilty"
2006	Numbers	Janet Eckworth	Episode: "Harvest"
2006	Related	Sue	Episode: "His Name Is Ruth"
2006	Joey	Woman	Episode: "Joey and the Big Move"
2007	Big Shots	Nadia	Episode: "Who's Your Daddy?"
2007	Journeyman	Bonnie	Episode: "Winterland"
2007, 2008	CSI: NY	Natalie Greer	2 episodes
2008–2009	Crash	Amy Battaglia	10 episodes
2009	Medium	Clare Burnes	Episode: "A Taste of Her Own Medicine"
2009	Three Rivers	Tracy Warren	Episode: "The Kindness of Strangers"
2009	Anatomy of Hope	Harriet	Television film
2010	Law & Order: LA	Dr. Phoebe Coburn	Episode: "Playa Vista"
2010–2012	Pretty Little Liars	Isabel Randall	3 episodes
2011	CSI: Miami	Rose Garrigan	Episode: "Caged"
2011	Criminal Minds	Kate Phinney	Episode: "The Stranger"
2011–2015	Awkward	Darlene Saxton	7 episodes
2012	The Mentalist	Colette Santori	Episode: "Always Bet on Red"
2012	Bones	Marcy Drew	Episode: "The Tiger in the Tale"
2013	Marvin Marvin	Stickler	Episode: "St. Glar Kai Day"
2014	Switched at Birth	Lydia Kaiser	3 episodes
2014	Matador	Sayer Assistant	Episode: "Everything Old Is New Again"
2014	Modern Family	Anne Gibbs	Episode: "Queer Eyes, Full Hearts"
2015	Glee	Publicist	Episode: "Loser like Me"
2015	House of Lies	Kathy Nichols	Episode: "Praise Money! Hallowed Be Thy Name"
2015	Castle	Gwen Kelly	Episode: "At Close Range"
2015	NCIS	Laura Strike-DePalma	Episode: "Double Trouble"
2015	Wicked City	Penelope Evans	Episode: "Blizzard of Ozz"
2016–2017	Insecure	Hannah Richards-Foster	5 episodes
2017	Doubt	Stephanie Verner	Episode: "Not a Word"
2017	Chance	Talia	2 episodes
2018	9-1-1	Beth Clark	Episode: "Next of Kin"
2018	Grey's Anatomy	Erin Mason	Episode: "Bad Reputation"
2018–2019	The Young and the Restless	Brenda Brecheen	5 episodes
2019	Magnum P.I.	Gina Pryor	Episode: "A Kiss Before Dying"
2019	Dear White People	Caroline Tuttle	Episode: "Volume 3: Chapter V"
2019	Good Trouble	Angela Miller	11 episodes
2019	How to Get Away with Murder	Heidi Turpin	Episode: "I Hate the World"
2019–2023	Tacoma FD	Vicky Penisi McConky	Recurring role, 18 episodes
2020	NCIS: Los Angeles	Margaux West	Episode: "War Crimes"
2022	The Lincoln Lawyer	Carol Dubois	Recurring role, 5 episodes
2022	American Gigolo	Anne	Episode: "Nothing Is Real But the Girl"
2022	General Hospital	Eileen Ashby	Recurring role
2023	The Rookie: Feds	Ashley Page	Episode: "Red One"
2024	S.W.A.T.	Lydia Samuels	Episode: "Vanished"
