= Bosmont =

- Location within Gauteng Location within South Africa
- Coordinates: 26°11′19″S 27°57′20″E
- Country: South Africa
- Province: Gauteng
- Municipality: City of Johannesburg
- Main Place: Johannesburg
- Established: 1954

Area
  - Total: 6.13 km^{2} (2.37 sq mi)

Population (2011)
  - Total: 6,301
  - Density: 1,030/km^{2} (2,660/sq mi)

Racial makeup (2011)
  - Black African: 18.5%
  - Coloured: 70.8%
  - Indian/Asian: 5.5%
  - White: 0.7%
  - Other: 4.5%

First languages (2011)
  - English: 69.3%
  - Afrikaans: 19.9%
  - Tswana: 2.2%
  - Zulu: 2.2%
  - Other: 6.5%
- Time zone: UTC+2 (SAST)
- Postal code (street): 2093

Bosmont is a suburb of Johannesburg, South Africa. It is located in Region B of the City of Johannesburg Metropolitan Municipality. Bosmont is located in the West Rand of Johannesburg and 70% of its residents are Coloured as of 2011.

== History ==
It was during the sixties that people of colour were forced to move from areas such as Albertsville, Vrededorp (Fietas) and other areas in and around the inner city to be settled in new designated areas such as Bosmont and Eldorado Park.

The name of this suburb - BOSMONT is derived from the fact that the street names are named after South African trees of bushes (Bos in Afrikaans, one of the local languages) and Mont (short for Mountain). This has been contracted into Bosmont. Streets running in one direction are named after trees Eg Olywenhout Street. Streets running perpendicular to them are named after mountains Eg. Soutpansburg Str.

As a result of the Group Areas Act, the Coloured people were forcibly relocated from 1962 to 1974 since Vrededorp was declared a European township in 1936.

The land for the suburb was proclaimed in June 1954. The township Bosmont and New Monteleo were joined together under the same name Bosmont in 1962. Bosmont was incorporated into the Johannesburg municipal area and developed by the Department of Community Development for Coloured People.

By June 1962, residents started occupying homes in Bosmont. Bosmont used to enjoy and is still enjoying considerable prestige as an elite suburb in the eyes of the Coloured community and houses there are sought after by those who can afford them.

A significant difference between Bosmont and other predominantly Coloured areas is its large concentration of Cape Malay Coloureds (the largest Cape Malay culture in Johannesburg). Due to this, Islam has become a prominent feature in Bosmont and it also exists in complete peace and harmony with other faiths such as Christianity and Hinduism, however Christianity still remains as the largest religion in Bosmont.

== Religion ==
Churches in Bosmont include:

- Bosmont Congregational Church
- Calvary Baptist Church
- Evangelical Bible Church Bosmont
- New Apostolic Church
- St Joseph the Worker Catholic Church
- St Luke's Anglican Church
- IAG Bethel Assembly
- AFM Eagles Wings
- New Life Baptist Church

The majority of Muslims in Bosmont follow the Shafi Madhab. This too is unique in that the majority of Muslims in the Gauteng province of (who are mostly Indian) follow the Hanafi Madhab. Leaders in churches and mosques play a big role in uniting the community to fight crime, drugs, etc.

== Education ==
Bosmont is home to four government schools (C.J. Botha High, R.W. Fick High, G.R. Harris Primary and Bosmont Primary) and two private schools (Bosmont Muslim School and St Barnabas High School). Recreational activities are the Bosmont library, various sports grounds (soccer, cricket, basketball and tennis) and the BFA Soccer Stadium.

== Sport and recreation ==
Bosmont has a number of soccer teams, including Aston Villa, Rangers, Universals and Dazzlers. Dazzlers Football Club is the most well-known and popular soccer team from Bosmont. Dazzlers was founded in the South African winter of 1949 in Albertville, Johannesburg, South Africa by Wilfred, ‘Willie’, Mooi and his cousin, Clifford Jousten.

Dazzlers Football Club originated with a comic book. Frank Stuart Pepper wrote a comic strip called ‘Danny of the Dazzlers’ which started appearing in ‘The Champion’ in 1948 and continued until the magazine's demise in 1955. Dazzlers FC played under the TIFA (Transvaal Independent Football Association) which represented Coloured, Indian and African football clubs.

Other activities can be found at the Bosmont Recreation Centre (Ward 82). Activities include Bosmont Clinic, Bosmont Alcoholics Anonymous, Cancer support, Children's afternoon free play, Church groups, Crime forum, Hall hire, Holiday programme, Karate, Modern dance, Senior citizens group, Table tennis, Youth Club Bosmont also has Chinese, Christian, Hindu, Muslim and Tamil sections in the Bosmont Cemetery.

== Other ==
Distances to other towns close to Bosmont include:

- Maraisburg (8.8 km)
- Newlands (8.8 km)
- Triomf (8.8 km)
- Florida (13.5 km)
- Westdene (13.5 km)
- Roosevelt Park (17.6 km)
- Brixton (17.7 km)
- Northcliff (19.6 km)
- Blackheath (20.4 km)
- Diepkloof (20.5 km)
- Linden (22.8 km)
- Melville (23.5 km)
- Emmarentia (24.4 km)
- Meadowlands (24.4 km)
- Weltevredenpark (26.7 km)
- Windsor (26.7 km)
- Orlando (28.7 km)
- Jabavu (28.7 km)
- Westcliffe (30.1 km)
- Parkview (30.1 km)
- Parktown (30.1 km)

== Notable people ==
- Ursula Chikane, television and radio presenter
