= Zoe Naylor =

Australian actress

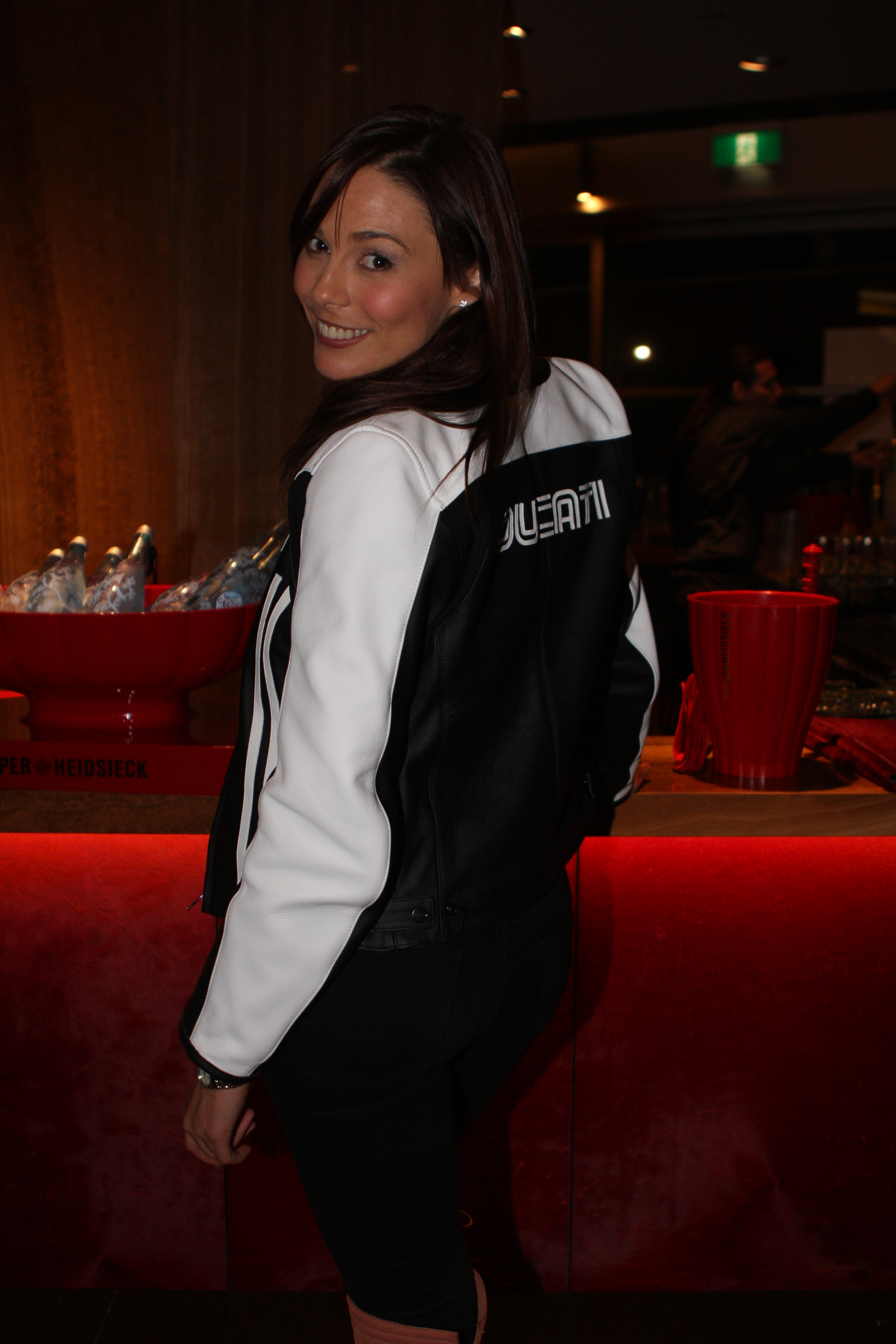
- Zoe Naylor in 2011
- Born: 4 July 1977 (age 48); Sydney, New South Wales, Australia
- Occupations: Actress/voiceover artist, model, presenter, speaker, writer
- Years active: 1995–present
- Spouse: James Trude (m. 2007, divorced)
- Partner: Aaron Jeffery (2010–present)
- Children: 2
- Website: zoenaylor.com

Zoe Naylor (born 4 July 1977) is an Australian actress, journalist and television presenter.

== Early life and education ==
Naylor was born in Sydney, Australia to Richard Naylor, a veterinarian, and Neroli, an English and History teacher. She graduated from Loreto Normanhurst where she was School Captain while training with the Australian Theatre for Young People in Sydney, then attended Charles Sturt University in Bathurst under a Seven Network scholarship. Naylor attended University of Technology in Sydney for a year to complete her Bachelor of Arts in Communications degree.

== Career ==
She was an announcer for Groove FM, then worked in television for A Current Affair, Escape with ET, The Footy Show, Gladiators, MTV Australia, National Nine News and SportsCafe (NZ). She has also written for magazines such as Australian Traveller and Road Rider.

After graduating from the Queensland University of Technology in 2002 with a Masters in Drama, she appeared in regional theatre productions. In 2005, she was cast as Regan McLeod in the television series McLeod's Daughters. She was also cast in the New Zealand series Orange Roughies. She later appeared in films such as The Reef (2010) and Robotropolis (2011).

== Personal life ==
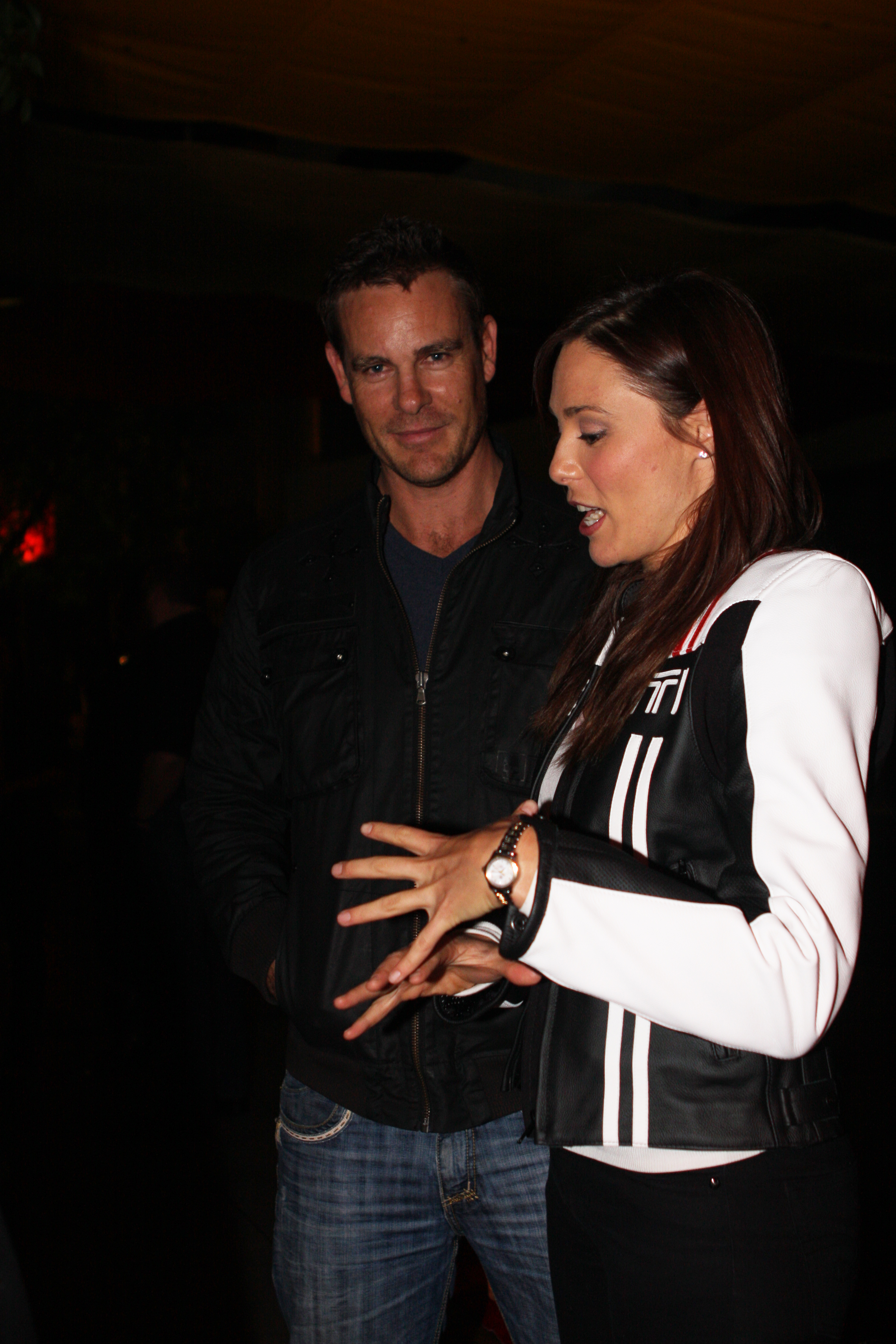
Aaron Jeffery and Zoe Naylor in 2011

Naylor married James Trude on 12 May 2007. She later divorced and began dating Aaron Jeffery. The couple welcomed their first child together, a daughter called Sophia Jade Jeffery, in 2012 and their second child, a son called Beau Charles Jeffery in 2016.

== Selected filmography ==
=== Film ===
Year	Title	Role	Type
2014	Locks of Love	Lady Claire	
2011	Robotropolis	Christiane Nouveau	Feature film
2010	The Reef	Kate	Feature film
2005	The Book of Revelation	Astrid	Feature film
2004	On the Lurk		
2003	Evil Never Dies	Abby	TV movie
2002	Sugar and Spice		
2000	Virtual Nightmare		TV movie
2000	A Love Story		
2000	The Product		
1999	Fearless	Hetty	TV movie

=== Television ===
Year	Title	Role	Type
2021	Birth Time - The Documentary	Self	Documentary; Also writer, producer, executive producer
2016–2018	Home and Away	Nina Gilbert	TV series, 7 episodes
2008	Gladiators	Host	TV series, 15 episodes
2007	Temptation	Contestant	TV series, 1 episode
2007–08	20 to One	Host	TV series, 4 episodes
2006	Orange Roughies	Jane Durant	TV series (NZ), 19 episodes
2005–2009	McLeod's Daughters	Regan McLeod	TV series, 48 episodes
2003	The Cooks	Janie	TV series Episode: Nights of Living Dangerously

== Bibliography ==
=== Contributor ===
- Naylor, Zoe (2007). "Contributor". Laugh Even Louder!. By Camp Quality. Gosford, New South Wales: Scholastic Australia Pty Limited. ISBN 978-1-74169-022-4.

Preceded by Kimberley Joseph	Co-Host of Gladiators; 2008–present	Succeeded by incumbent
