= Ursula Chikane =

South African television and radio presenter

- Born: Ursula Stapelfeldt; Bosmont, Johannesburg, South Africa
- Occupations: television and radio presenter
- Known for: Presenting Top Billing

Ursula Chikane (née Stapelfeldt) is a South African television and radio presenter best known for her role at Top Billing. She also presents on the radio using the handle "Brown Sugar."

== Biography ==
Chikane was born in Bosmont, Johannesburg. She was raised as a Catholic and was educated at Saint Catherine’s Convent in Florida, then studied Public Relations at Technikon Witwatersrand.

She began her television career as a sports presenter for SABC’s TopSport , then presented extreme sports shows Mild 2 Wild, Time Out, The Bar One Manhunt and MTN Gladiators. She is best known for presenting on SABC 2’s lifestyle magazine programme Top Billing. She has interviewed politicians including Tony Blair, Thabo Mbeki, Nelson Mandela, Cyril Ramaphosa and Helen Zille; celebrities including Halle Berry, Beyoncé, Colin Farrell, Sibongile Khumalo, John Legend, Hugh Masekela, Gregory Porter, and Charlize Theron; and writers including Toni Morrison and Iyandla Vanzant.

Chikane has also presented radio shows, including the World Chart Show on 5FM, Afternoons with Ursula Chikane on HOT 102.7FM and SoulPOWER on Power 98.7FM. Her show Jammin' Africa was produced by Radio Express in Hollywood, California. She presents on the radio using the handle "Brown Sugar."

Chikane has presented events including the Miss South Africa Pageant and the Presidential Sport Awards.
