= Glenn Hicks =

Canadian ice hockey player (born 1958)

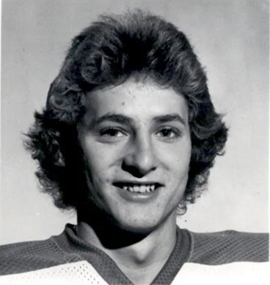
- Hicks in 1978 photo
- Born: August 28, 1958 (age 67) Red Deer, Alberta, Canada
- Height: 5 ft 10 in (178 cm)
- Weight: 177 lb (80 kg; 12 st 9 lb)
- Position: Left wing
- Shot: Left
- Played for: Detroit Red Wings; Winnipeg Jets; EHC Kloten
- NHL draft: 28th overall, 1978; Detroit Red Wings
- Playing career: 1978–1986

Glenn Ryan Hicks (born August 28, 1958) is a Canadian former professional ice hockey left winger. He played 69 games in the World Hockey Association with the Winnipeg Jets during the 1978–79 season and 108 games in the National Hockey League with the Detroit Red Wings during the 1979–80 and 1980–81 seasons. The rest of his career, which lasted from 1978 to 1986, was spent in the minor leagues. Glenn is the brother of Doug Hicks.

== Career statistics ==
=== Regular season and playoffs ===
			Regular season					Playoffs
Season	Team	League	GP	G	A	Pts	PIM	GP	G	A	Pts	PIM
1974–75	Red Deer Chiefs U18	AAHA	60	45	30	75	78	—	—	—	—	—
1975–76	Flin Flon Bombers	WCHL	71	16	19	35	103	—	—	—	—	—
1976–77	Flin Flon Bombers	WCHL	71	28	31	59	175	—	—	—	—	—
1977–78	Flin Flon Bombers	WCHL	72	50	69	119	225	17	15	15	30	34
1978–79	Winnipeg Jets	WHA	69	6	10	16	48	7	1	1	2	4
1979–80	Detroit Red Wings	NHL	50	1	2	3	43	—	—	—	—	—
1980–81	Detroit Red Wings	NHL	58	5	10	15	84	—	—	—	—	—
1980–81	Adirondack Red Wings	AHL	19	10	6	16	56	—	—	—	—	—
1981–82	Tulsa Oilers	CHL	78	14	34	48	103	3	0	0	0	7
1982–83	Birmingham South Stars	CHL	80	13	26	39	40	13	0	7	7	23
1983–84	Salt Lake Golden Eagles	CHL	62	4	26	30	87	5	0	1	1	16
1984–85	EHC Kloten	NLA	38	12	17	29	—	—	—	—	—	—
1984–85	Springfield Indians	AHL	11	3	4	7	4	—	—	—	—	—
1985–86	Salt Lake Golden Eagles	IHL	82	14	40	54	75	5	0	4	4	6
WHA totals			69	6	10	16	48	7	1	1	2	4
NHL totals			108	6	12	18	127	—	—	—	—	—
