= Gladiators (2008 British TV series) series 2 =

Gladiators
- Series 2

Release
- Original network: Sky1
- Original release: December 2008

The second series of Gladiators started in December 2008 with a Legends Special. The series aired on Sky1 and Sky1 HD. Many changes were made from the first series, including six new Gladiators - Cyclone (returning from series one), Siren, Amazon, Warrior, Goliath and Doom. Three more games were added to the event pool - Pursuit & Suspension Bridge, which were seen in the ITV version of the show, and Rocketball. Ian Wright returned as presenter with Caroline Flack, who replaced Kirsty Gallacher. Taking over from original referee John Anderson (due to his retirement from TV refereeing) was boxing referee John Coyle.

== Gladiators ==
Gladiators name	Portrayed by
Amazon	Zoe Williams
Atlas	Sam Bond
Battleaxe	Shirley Webb
Cyclone	Donna Williams
Doom	Wayne Gordon
Enigma	Jenny Pacey
Goliath	Mason Ryan
Inferno	Jemma Palmer
Oblivion	Nick Aldis
Panther	Kara Nwidobie-Sharpe
Predator	Du'aine Ladejo
Siren	Amy Guy
Spartan	Roderick Bradley
Tempest	Lucy Boggis
Tornado	David McIntosh
Warrior	Daniel Singh

== Events ==
Three new events were added to the pool for the second series. Suspension Bridge and Pursuit returned from the original series. Suspension Bridge is now played over water and the Pursuit course also contains a water element. The only new event was Rocketball, a modified version of Swingshot from the original series. The Eliminator layout was also heavily revised for this series, now including the "Floor Travelator" as the preceding obstacle to the monkey bars.

Event	Female Gladiator participation	Male Gladiator participation
Duel	Amazon; Battleaxe; Panther	Atlas; Goliath; Spartan
Earthquake	Battleaxe; Enigma; Panther; Siren	Atlas; Doom; Goliath; Oblivion; Warrior
Gauntlet	Amazon; Battleaxe; Enigma; Inferno; Panther; Siren; Tempest	Atlas; Doom; Goliath; Oblivion; Predator; Spartan; Warrior
Hang Tough	Battleaxe; Cyclone; Siren; Tempest	Atlas; Oblivion; Spartan; Tornado
Hit & Run	Amazon; Battleaxe; Cyclone; Enigma; Inferno; Siren; Tempest	Atlas; Doom; Oblivion; Spartan; Tornado; Warrior
Powerball	Amazon; Battleaxe; Enigma; Panther; Siren	Doom; Goliath; Oblivion; Predator; Spartan; Tornado; Warrior
Pursuit	Amazon; Enigma; Tempest	Doom; Predator; Spartan
Pyramid	Amazon; Battleaxe; Enigma; Panther; Siren	Doom; Goliath; Oblivion; Predator; Spartan; Tornado; Warrior
Rocketball	Cyclone; Enigma; Inferno; Siren; Tempest	Atlas; Oblivion; Predator; Spartan; Warrior
Suspension Bridge	Battleaxe; Panther; Siren	Doom; Goliath; Oblivion; Warrior
The Wall	Cyclone; Enigma; Tempest	Doom; Predator; Spartan; Tornado

== The Contenders ==
	Female Contenders		Male Contenders	
Heat 1	**Steph Owens**	Roz Richards	**Justin Thompson**	Mark Mills
Heat 2	Leanne Maisano	**Wendy Williams**	John Maisano	**Simeon Bambrook**
Heat 3	Becky Pykett	**Kathryn Evans**	**Kris Stirk**	Terry Sterling
Heat 4	**Yvette Shaw**	Gemma Green	Norris Thompson	**David Staff**
Heat 5	Kelly McTighe	**Hannah Creelman**	Ronnie Williams	**Dan Atkinson**
Heat 6	Vicky Poole	**Emma Piper**	Qu Adoo	**Paul Witham**

	Female Contenders		Male Contenders	
Quarter-Final 1	Yvette Shaw	**Steph Owens**	**Kris Stirk**	Dan Atkinson
Quarter-Final 2	Wendy Williams	**Kathryn Evans**	**Justin Thompson**	Paul Witham
Quarter-Final 3	**Hannah Creelman^**	**Emma Piper**	**David Staff**	**Simeon Bambrook^**

	Female Contenders		Male Contenders	
Semi-Final 1	**Kathryn Evans**	Emma Piper	**Kris Stirk**	Simeon Bambrook
Semi-Final 2	**Hannah Creelman**	Steph Owens	**David Staff**	Justin Thompson

	Female Contenders		Male Contenders	
Final	Hannah Creelman	**Kathryn Evans**	**David Staff**	Kris Stirk

Winner (Female)	Winner (Male)
Kathryn Evans	David Staff

^{Notes: Red & Blue denote the colours worn by the contestant
Contenders in bold are the ones that advanced
^ denotes the fastest runner-up in the 1/4 finals thus advancing to the semis.}

== Episodes ==
No.	Title	Event	Legends	Outcome	Original release date
Special	"The Legends Strike Back"	Event 1 - Hang Tough	Tempest / Oblivion	Scorpio 0 / 0 Wolf ^{01}	21 December 2008
Special	"The Legends Strike Back"	Event 2 - Gauntlet	Panther, Enigma, Inferno, Battleaxe / Atlas, Spartan, Tornado, Oblivion	Rocket 10 / 10 Cobra	21 December 2008
Special	"The Legends Strike Back"	Event 3 - The Wall	Tempest, Enigma / Predator, Tornado	Lightning, Scorpio 10 / 10 Cobra, Bullit	21 December 2008
Special	"The Legends Strike Back"	Event 4 - Duel	Panther / Spartan	Siren 20 / 10 Trojan	21 December 2008
Special	"The Legends Strike Back"	Eliminator Relay	Enigma, Battleaxe, Panther, Tempest / Spartan, Predator, Tornado, Oblivion	Female Legends LOSERS - WINNERS Female Gladiators Male Legends LOSERS - WINNERS - Male Gladiators	21 December 2008
Legends: Lightning, Rocket, Scorpio, Siren / Bullit, Cobra, Trojan, Wolf
1	"Heat 1: Roz Richards vs. Steph Owens; Mark Mills vs. Justin Thompson"	Event 1 - Duel	Panther / Spartan	Roz 0 - 0 Steph; Mark 0 - 0 Justin	4 January 2009
1	"Heat 1: Roz Richards vs. Steph Owens; Mark Mills vs. Justin Thompson"	Event 2 - Rocketball	Inferno, Siren / Atlas, Oblivion	Roz 3 - 5 Steph; Mark 4 - 7 Justin	4 January 2009
1	"Heat 1: Roz Richards vs. Steph Owens; Mark Mills vs. Justin Thompson"	Event 3 - Earthquake	Siren, Enigma / Oblivion, Goliath	Roz 3 - 15 Steph; Mark 14 - 7 Justin	4 January 2009
1	"Heat 1: Roz Richards vs. Steph Owens; Mark Mills vs. Justin Thompson"	Event 4 - Hit & Run	Battleaxe, Cyclone, Inferno, Siren / Atlas, Doom, Spartan, Warrior	Roz 3 - 15 Steph; Mark 14 - 15 Justin	4 January 2009
1	"Heat 1: Roz Richards vs. Steph Owens; Mark Mills vs. Justin Thompson"	Eliminator	N/A	Roz LOSER - WINNER Steph Mark LOSER - WINNER Justin	4 January 2009
2	"Heat 2: Wendy Williams vs. Leanne Maisano; Simeon Bambrook vs. John Maisano"	Event 1 - Powerball	Amazon, Battleaxe, Panther / Spartan, Oblivion, Predator	Wendy 2 - 0 Leanne; Simeon 8 - 2 John	11 January 2009
2	"Heat 2: Wendy Williams vs. Leanne Maisano; Simeon Bambrook vs. John Maisano"	Event 2 - Hang Tough	Siren, Tempest / Tornado, Spartan	Wendy 2 - 0 Leanne; Simeon 8 - 7 John	11 January 2009
2	"Heat 2: Wendy Williams vs. Leanne Maisano; Simeon Bambrook vs. John Maisano"	Event 3 - The Wall	Tempest, Cyclone / Predator, Tornado	Wendy 2 - 0 Leanne; Simeon 18 - 12 John	11 January 2009
2	"Heat 2: Wendy Williams vs. Leanne Maisano; Simeon Bambrook vs. John Maisano"	Event 4 - Gauntlet	Panther, Amazon, Siren, Battleaxe / Oblivion, Predator, Warrior, Goliath	Wendy 12 - 6 Leanne; Simeon 28 - 22 John	11 January 2009
2	"Heat 2: Wendy Williams vs. Leanne Maisano; Simeon Bambrook vs. John Maisano"	Eliminator	N/A	Wendy WINNER - LOSER Leanne Simeon WINNER - LOSER John	11 January 2009
3	"Heat 3: Kathryn Evans vs. Becky Pykett; Kris Stirk vs. Terry Sterling"	Event 1 - Hang Tough	Tempest, Siren / Atlas, Tornado	Kathryn 0 - 0 Becky; Kris 0 - 0 Terry	18 January 2009
3	"Heat 3: Kathryn Evans vs. Becky Pykett; Kris Stirk vs. Terry Sterling"	Event 2 - Pursuit	Enigma, Amazon / Predator, Doom	Kathryn 4 - 0 Becky; Kris 0^{1} - 10 Terry	18 January 2009
3	"Heat 3: Kathryn Evans vs. Becky Pykett; Kris Stirk vs. Terry Sterling"	Event 3 - Hit & Run	Battleaxe, Inferno, Siren, Tempest / Atlas, Doom, Spartan, Warrior	Kathryn 14 - 0 Becky; Kris 12 - 10^{2} Terry	18 January 2009
3	"Heat 3: Kathryn Evans vs. Becky Pykett; Kris Stirk vs. Terry Sterling"	Event 4 - Pyramid	Amazon, Enigma / Spartan, Tornado	Kathryn 14 - 0 Becky; Kris 12 - 20^{3} Terry	18 January 2009
3	"Heat 3: Kathryn Evans vs. Becky Pykett; Kris Stirk vs. Terry Sterling"	Eliminator	N/A	Kathryn WINNER - LOSER Becky Kris WINNER - LOSER Terry	18 January 2009
4	"Heat 4: Yvette Shaw vs. Gemma Green/Suzie; Norris Thompson vs. David Staff"	Event 1 - Powerball	Enigma, Amazon, Panther / Tornado, Oblivion, Doom	Yvette 0 - 0 Gemma; Norris 2 - 5 David	25 January 2009
4	"Heat 4: Yvette Shaw vs. Gemma Green/Suzie; Norris Thompson vs. David Staff"	Event 2 - Hang Tough	Tempest, Cyclone / Atlas, Tornado	Yvette 0 - 0 Gemma; Norris 7 - 10 David	25 January 2009
4	"Heat 4: Yvette Shaw vs. Gemma Green/Suzie; Norris Thompson vs. David Staff"	Event 3 - Gauntlet	Enigma, Tempest, Battleaxe, Panther / Atlas, Oblivion, Warrior, Goliath	Yvette 4 - 10 Gemma; Norris 17 - 20 David	25 January 2009
4	"Heat 4: Yvette Shaw vs. Gemma Green/Suzie; Norris Thompson vs. David Staff"	Event 4 - Suspension Bridge	Panther, Battleaxe / Warrior, Goliath	Yvette 4 - 10 Gemma; Norris 17 - 30 David	25 January 2009
4	"Heat 4: Yvette Shaw vs. Gemma Green/Suzie; Norris Thompson vs. David Staff"	Eliminator	N/A	Yvette WINNER - LOSER Suzie Norris LOSER - WINNER David	25 January 2009
5	"Heat 5: Hannah Creelman vs. Kelly McTighe; Dan Atkinson vs. Ronnie Williams"	Event 1 - Duel	Panther / Goliath	Hannah 0 - 0 Kelly v Dan 0 - 0 Ronnie	1 February 2009
5	"Heat 5: Hannah Creelman vs. Kelly McTighe; Dan Atkinson vs. Ronnie Williams"	Event 2 - Rocketball	Inferno, Tempest / Spartan, Predator	Hannah 3 - 2 Kelly; Dan 5 - 2 Ronnie	1 February 2009
5	"Heat 5: Hannah Creelman vs. Kelly McTighe; Dan Atkinson vs. Ronnie Williams"	Event 3 - Earthquake	Battleaxe, Siren / Warrior, Oblivion	Hannah 8 - 2 Kelly; Dan 5 - 12 Ronnie	1 February 2009
5	"Heat 5: Hannah Creelman vs. Kelly McTighe; Dan Atkinson vs. Ronnie Williams"	Event 4 - Hit & Run	Enigma, Inferno, Siren, Tempest / Atlas, Oblivion, Spartan, Warrior	Hannah 10 - 6 Kelly; Dan 7 - 12^{4} Ronnie	1 February 2009
5	"Heat 5: Hannah Creelman vs. Kelly McTighe; Dan Atkinson vs. Ronnie Williams"	Eliminator	N/A	Hannah WINNER - LOSER Kelly Dan WINNER - LOSER Ronnie	1 February 2009
6	"Heat 6: Vicky Poole vs. Emma Piper; Paul Witham vs. Qu Adoo"	Event 1 - Hang Tough	Siren, Cyclone / Atlas, Oblivion	Vicky 0 - 5 Emma; Paul 0 - 5 Qu	8 February 2009
6	"Heat 6: Vicky Poole vs. Emma Piper; Paul Witham vs. Qu Adoo"	Event 2 - Pursuit	Enigma, Tempest / Spartan, Doom	Vicky 4 - 7 Emma; Paul 10 - 7 Qu	8 February 2009
6	"Heat 6: Vicky Poole vs. Emma Piper; Paul Witham vs. Qu Adoo"	Event 3 - Hit & Run	Amazon, Cyclone, Enigma, Inferno / Atlas, Oblivion, Spartan, Tornado	Vicky 10 - 11 Emma; Paul 24 - 7 Qu	8 February 2009
6	"Heat 6: Vicky Poole vs. Emma Piper; Paul Witham vs. Qu Adoo"	Event 4 - Pyramid	Amazon, Siren / Predator, Doom	Vicky 10 - 11 Emma; Paul 24 - 17 Qu	8 February 2009
6	"Heat 6: Vicky Poole vs. Emma Piper; Paul Witham vs. Qu Adoo"	Eliminator	N/A	Vicky LOSER - WINNER Emma Paul WINNER - LOSER Qu	8 February 2009
7	"Quarter-Final 1: Yvette Shaw vs. Steph Owens; Dan Atkinson vs. Kris Stirk"	Event 1 - Hang Tough	Cyclone, Siren / Spartan, Atlas	Yvette 0 - 0 Steph; Dan 0 - 0 Kris	22 February 2009
7	"Quarter-Final 1: Yvette Shaw vs. Steph Owens; Dan Atkinson vs. Kris Stirk"	Event 2 - Gauntlet	Panther, Amazon, Enigma, Battleaxe / Spartan, Doom, Oblivion, Atlas	Yvette 6 - 10^{5} Steph; Dan 10 - 10 Kris	22 February 2009
7	"Quarter-Final 1: Yvette Shaw vs. Steph Owens; Dan Atkinson vs. Kris Stirk"	Event 3 - Suspension Bridge / Rocketball	Siren, Battleaxe / Predator, Oblivion	Yvette 6 - 10 Steph; Dan 10 - 14 Kris	22 February 2009
7	"Quarter-Final 1: Yvette Shaw vs. Steph Owens; Dan Atkinson vs. Kris Stirk"	Event 4 - Powerball	Amazon, Panther, Enigma / Spartan, Oblivion, Doom	Yvette 6 - 10 Steph; Dan 14 - 18 Kris	22 February 2009
7	"Quarter-Final 1: Yvette Shaw vs. Steph Owens; Dan Atkinson vs. Kris Stirk"	Eliminator	N/A	Yvette LOSER - WINNER Steph Dan LOSER - WINNER Kris	22 February 2009
8	"Quarter-Final 2: Wendy Williams vs. Kathryn Evans; Justin Thompson vs. Paul Witham"	Event 1 - Hang Tough	Tempest, Siren / Oblivion, Spartan	Wendy 0 - 0 Kathryn; Justin 0 - 0 Paul	1 March 2009
8	"Quarter-Final 2: Wendy Williams vs. Kathryn Evans; Justin Thompson vs. Paul Witham"	Event 2 - Gauntlet	Panther, Siren, Inferno, Enigma / Atlas, Doom, Warrior/Oblivion^{6}, Goliath	Wendy 6 - 2 Kathryn; Justin 10 - 8^{7} Paul	1 March 2009
8	"Quarter-Final 2: Wendy Williams vs. Kathryn Evans; Justin Thompson vs. Paul Witham"	Event 3 - Rocketball / Suspension Bridge	Inferno, Enigma / Doom, Oblivion	Wendy 7 - 6^{8} Kathryn; Justin 20 - 8 Paul	1 March 2009
8	"Quarter-Final 2: Wendy Williams vs. Kathryn Evans; Justin Thompson vs. Paul Witham"	Event 4 - Powerball	Siren, Amazon, Panther / Spartan, Goliath, Warrior	Wendy 9 - 8 Kathryn; Justin 26 - 12^{9} Paul	1 March 2009
8	"Quarter-Final 2: Wendy Williams vs. Kathryn Evans; Justin Thompson vs. Paul Witham"	Eliminator	N/A	Wendy LOSER - WINNER Kathryn Justin WINNER - LOSER Paul	1 March 2009
9	"Quarter-Final 3: Emma Piper vs. Hannah Creelman; Simeon Bambrook vs. David Staff"	Event 1 - Duel	Panther / Goliath	Emma 0 - 0 Hannah; Simeon 0 - 0 David	8 March 2009
9	"Quarter-Final 3: Emma Piper vs. Hannah Creelman; Simeon Bambrook vs. David Staff"	Event 2 - Rocketball	Inferno, Cyclone / Predator, Warrior	Emma 3 - 2 Hannah; Simeon 2 - 6 David	8 March 2009
9	"Quarter-Final 3: Emma Piper vs. Hannah Creelman; Simeon Bambrook vs. David Staff"	Event 3 - Hit & Run / Earthquake	Enigma, Inferno, Siren, Tempest / Oblivion, Doom	Emma 3 - 2 Hannah; Simeon 7 - 16 David	8 March 2009
9	"Quarter-Final 3: Emma Piper vs. Hannah Creelman; Simeon Bambrook vs. David Staff"	Event 4 - The Wall	Cyclone, Tempest / Spartan, Predator	Emma 3 - 2 Hannah; Simeon 17 - 21 David	8 March 2009
9	"Quarter-Final 3: Emma Piper vs. Hannah Creelman; Simeon Bambrook vs. David Staff"	Eliminator	N/A	Emma WINNER - FASTEST LOSER Hannah Simeon FASTEST LOSER - WINNER David	8 March 2009
10	"Semi-Final 1: Emma Piper vs. Kathryn Evans; Kris Stirk vs. Simeon Bambrook"	Event 1 - Duel	Panther / Goliath	Emma 0 - 0 Kathryn; Kris 0 - 0 Simeon	15 March 2009
10	"Semi-Final 1: Emma Piper vs. Kathryn Evans; Kris Stirk vs. Simeon Bambrook"	Event 2 - Pursuit	Enigma, Tempest / Spartan, Predator	Emma 2 - 2 Kathryn; Kris 10 - 4 Simeon	15 March 2009
10	"Semi-Final 1: Emma Piper vs. Kathryn Evans; Kris Stirk vs. Simeon Bambrook"	Event 3 - Hit & Run / Earthquake	Cyclone, Inferno, Siren, Tempest / Oblivion, Atlas	Emma 2 - 2^{10} Kathryn; Kris 10 - 14 Simeon	15 March 2009
10	"Semi-Final 1: Emma Piper vs. Kathryn Evans; Kris Stirk vs. Simeon Bambrook"	Event 4 - Pyramid	Siren, Panther / Predator, Doom	Emma 2 - 2 Kathryn; Kris 20 - 24^{11} Simeon	15 March 2009
10	"Semi-Final 1: Emma Piper vs. Kathryn Evans; Kris Stirk vs. Simeon Bambrook"	Eliminator	N/A	Emma LOSER - WINNER Kathryn Kris WINNER - LOSER Simeon	15 March 2009
11	"Semi-Final 2: Hannah Creelman vs. Steph Owens; Justin Thompson vs. David Staff"	Event 1 - Duel	Battleaxe / Spartan	Hannah 0 - 5 Steph; Justin 0 - 0 David	22 March 2009
11	"Semi-Final 2: Hannah Creelman vs. Steph Owens; Justin Thompson vs. David Staff"	Event 2 - Pursuit	Tempest, Amazon / Predator, Doom	Hannah 0 - 5 Steph; Justin 2 - 10 David	22 March 2009
11	"Semi-Final 2: Hannah Creelman vs. Steph Owens; Justin Thompson vs. David Staff"	Event 3 - Earthquake / Hit & Run	Siren, Panther / Atlas, Doom, Oblivion, Warrior	Hannah 5 - 5 Steph; Justin 6 - 14 David	22 March 2009
11	"Semi-Final 2: Hannah Creelman vs. Steph Owens; Justin Thompson vs. David Staff"	Event 4 - Pyramid	Battleaxe, Enigma / Oblivion, Predator	Hannah 5 - 5 Steph; Justin 6^{12} - 14 David	22 March 2009
11	"Semi-Final 2: Hannah Creelman vs. Steph Owens; Justin Thompson vs. David Staff"	Eliminator	N/A	Hannah WINNER - LOSER Steph Justin LOSER - WINNER David	22 March 2009
12	"Grand Final: Hannah Creelman vs. Kathryn Evans; David Staff vs. Kris Stirk"	Event 1 - Gauntlet	Panther, Siren, Tempest, Inferno, Enigma / Oblivion, Warrior, Predator, Atlas, Goliath	Hannah 2 - 2 Kathryn; David 8 - 6 Kris	29 March 2009
12	"Grand Final: Hannah Creelman vs. Kathryn Evans; David Staff vs. Kris Stirk"	Event 2 - Duel	Panther / Atlas	Hannah 2 - 2 Kathryn; David 8 - 6 Kris	29 March 2009
12	"Grand Final: Hannah Creelman vs. Kathryn Evans; David Staff vs. Kris Stirk"	Event 3 - The Wall / Hang Tough	Tempest, Cyclone / Oblivion, Atlas	Hannah 2 - 2 Kathryn; David 8 - 6 Kris	29 March 2009
12	"Grand Final: Hannah Creelman vs. Kathryn Evans; David Staff vs. Kris Stirk"	Event 4 - Pyramid	Siren, Enigma / Warrior, Goliath	Hannah 2 - 2 Kathryn; David 18 - 6 Kris	29 March 2009
12	"Grand Final: Hannah Creelman vs. Kathryn Evans; David Staff vs. Kris Stirk"	Eliminator	N/A	Hannah RUNNER-UP - CHAMPION Kathryn David CHAMPION - RUNNER-UP Kris	29 March 2009
13	"Champion of Champions: Anna Miller vs. Kathryn Evans; Simon Wray vs. David Staff"	Event 1 - Duel	Battleaxe / Atlas	Anna 0 - 5 Kathryn; Simon 0 - 0 David	5 April 2009
13	"Champion of Champions: Anna Miller vs. Kathryn Evans; Simon Wray vs. David Staff"	Event 2 - Powerball	Amazon, Panther, Siren / Oblivion, Spartan, Doom	Anna 8 - 7 Kathryn; Simon 8 - 9 David	5 April 2009
13	"Champion of Champions: Anna Miller vs. Kathryn Evans; Simon Wray vs. David Staff"	Event 3 - Hit & Run / Earthquake	Battleaxe, Inferno, Siren, Tempest / Oblivion, Goliath	Anna 18 - 15 Kathryn; Simon 8 - 9 David	5 April 2009
13	"Champion of Champions: Anna Miller vs. Kathryn Evans; Simon Wray vs. David Staff"	Event 4 - Pyramid	Battleaxe, Panther / Goliath, Warrior	Anna 18 - 15 Kathryn; Simon 18 - 14 David	5 April 2009
13	"Champion of Champions: Anna Miller vs. Kathryn Evans; Simon Wray vs. David Staff"	Eliminator	N/A	Anna WINNER - LOSER Kathryn Simon LOSER - WINNER David	5 April 2009
14	"Battle of the Athletes: Karen Pickering vs. Kelly Smith; Kyran Bracken vs. James DeGale"	Event 1 - Hang Tough	Siren, Battleaxe / Oblivion, Atlas	Karen 0 - 0 Kelly; Kyran 0 - 0 James	12 April 2009
14	"Battle of the Athletes: Karen Pickering vs. Kelly Smith; Kyran Bracken vs. James DeGale"	Event 2 - The Wall	Enigma, Cyclone / Doom, Predator	Karen 0 - 0 Kelly; Kyran 10 - 0 James	12 April 2009
14	"Battle of the Athletes: Karen Pickering vs. Kelly Smith; Kyran Bracken vs. James DeGale"	Event 3 - Duel	Amazon / Goliath	Karen 10^{13} - 0 Kelly; Kyran 10 - 0 James	12 April 2009
14	"Battle of the Athletes: Karen Pickering vs. Kelly Smith; Kyran Bracken vs. James DeGale"	Event 4 - Powerball	Panther, Siren, Enigma / Tornado, Oblivion, Doom	Karen 10 - 11 Kelly; Kyran 10 - 2^{14} James	12 April 2009
14	"Battle of the Athletes: Karen Pickering vs. Kelly Smith; Kyran Bracken vs. James DeGale"	Eliminator	N/A	Karen LOSER - WINNER Kelly Kyran WINNER - LOSER James	12 April 2009
15	"The Legends Last Stand"	Event 1 - Duel	Panther / Goliath	Panther 0 / 0 Khan	25 October 2009
15	"The Legends Last Stand"	Event 2 - Rocketball	Inferno, Tempest / Oblivion, Predator	Vogue, Panther 6 / 3 Cobra, Ace	25 October 2009
15	"The Legends Last Stand"	Event 3 - Earthquake	Siren / Wolf^{15}	Rebel 11 / 13 Trojan	25 October 2009
15	"The Legends Last Stand"	Event 4 - Hit & Run	Amazon, Cyclone, Inferno, Siren / Atlas, Oblivion, Spartan, Warrior	Siren 15 / 13 Ace	25 October 2009
15	"The Legends Last Stand"	Eliminator Relay	Siren, Panther, Amazon / Oblivion, Warrior, Spartan, Goliath	Female Legends LOSERS - WINNERS Female Gladiators Male Legends LOSERS - WINNERS - Male Gladiators	25 October 2009
Legends: Panther, Rebel, Siren, Vogue / Ace, Cobra, Khan, Trojan

^01 Wolf ignored the referee and was disqualified from this event.
^1 Kris was disqualified from this event.
^2 Terry was disqualified from this event.
^3 Tornado was disqualified from this event, giving Terry 10 points.
^4 Ronnie was disqualified from this event.
^5 Steph originally scored 6 points but was given an extra 4 points due to infringements from Panther and Enigma.
^6 Warrior was injured during a clash with Justin and had to retire from the event, instead Oblivion took his place.
^7 Paul originally scored 6 points but was given an extra 2 points due to an infringement from Doom.
^8 Kathryn originally scored 2 points but was given an extra 2 points due to two infringements from Enigma.
^9 Paul originally scored 2 points but was given an extra 2 points due an infringement from Warrior.
^10 Kathryn was disqualified from this event.
^11 Doom was disqualified from this event, giving Simeon 10 points.
^12 Justin was disqualified from this event.
^13 Amazon was disqualified from this event, giving Karen 10 points.
^14 Kyran placed a red ball on the outer pod, giving James 2 points.
^15 As Trojan said he wanted a revenge with Wolf for this' transition to the Gladiators team, Wolf decided to face him on Earthquake instead of Oblivion.

== Ratings ==
Episode Viewing figures from BARB.

=== Series ===
Episode No.	Heat No.	Airdate	Total Viewers	Sky One Weekly Rank
1	Heat 1	4 January 2009	748,000	#3
2	Heat 2	11 January 2009	621,000	#5
3	Heat 3	18 January 2009	N/A (Under 561,000)	N/A (Outside Top 10)
4	Heat 4	25 January 2009	N/A (Under 548,000)	N/A (Outside Top 10)
5	Heat 5	1 February 2009	645,000	#7
6	Heat 6	8 February 2009	N/A (Under 592,000)	N/A (Outside Top 10)
7	Quarter-Final 1	22 February 2009	605,000	#7
8	Quarter-Final 2	1 March 2009	558,000	#10
9	Quarter-Final 3	8 March 2009	N/A (Under 584,000)	N/A (Outside Top 10)
10	Semi-Final 1	15 March 2009	N/A (Under 505,000)	N/A (Outside Top 10)
11	Semi-Final 2	22 March 2009	N/A (Under 532,000)	N/A (Outside Top 10)
12	Grand Final	29 March 2009	N/A (Under 514,000)	N/A (Outside Top 10)

=== Specials ===
Episode No.	Heat No.	Airdate	Total Viewers	Sky One Weekly Rank
1	The Legends Strike Back (1½ hours)	21 December 2008	697,000	#3
2	Battle of the Forces	15 February 2009	548,000	#7
3	Champion Of Champions	5 April 2009	N/A (Under 471,000)	N/A (Outside Top 10)
4	Battle Of The Athletes	12 April 2009	N/A (Under 485,000)	N/A (Outside Top 10)
5	The Legends Last Stand	25 October 2009	N/A (Under 621,000)	N/A (Outside Top 10)

== Specials ==
=== The Legends Strike Back ===
Aired on 21 December 2008, original Gladiators Lightning, Wolf, Scorpio, Trojan, Rocket, Cobra, Siren and Bullit returned to the arena to compete against the new breed of Gladiators. In both of the Eliminators, the new breed of Gladiators won.

=== Battle of the Forces ===
Aired on 15 February 2009, Contenders from the RAF, Navy and the Army competed against each other in the second Battle of the Forces competition. The winning female contender was from the RAF and the winning male contender was from the Army.

=== Champion of Champions ===
Aired on 5 April 2009, last year's champions, Anna and Simon, compete against this year's champions, Kathryn and David. Anna proved to be on better form in the women's competition, but Simon failed to meet his expectations, and this year's winner David scooped the win.

=== Battle of the Athletes ===
Aired on 12 April 2009, four Olympic Athletes - Karen Pickering, Kelly Smith, James DeGale and Kyran Bracken - competed against each other for charity. Kelly Smith and Kyran Bracken were the Champions. Although a first occurred in Gladiators as boxer James DeGale slipped on the Floor Travelator, which has never happened before.

=== The Legends Last Stand ===
Aired on 25 October 2009, in the last episode of the first revival series, ex-Gladiators Trojan, Ace, Khan, Cobra, Rebel, Vogue, Panther and Siren return to the arena for one last time to compete against the new Gladiators. Features include Khan facing Goliath on Duel, and Wolf battling Trojan on Earthquake.
