= Gladiators: Train 2 Win =

- Genre: Children's sports entertainment game show
- Created by: Dan Carr and John Ferraro
- Based on: Gladiators 2000 (1994–1996)
- Presented by: Sharron Davies and Daley Thompson (1995); Various Gladiators on rotation (1996); Margherita Taylor (1997–98); Kyran Bracken (1997); Lee Sharpe (1998)
- Starring: Frank Dick (1995); John Anderson (1996); Andrew Norgate (1997–98)
- Narrated by: John Sachs (1995–96); Mitch Johnson (1997–98)
- Country of origin: United Kingdom
- Original language: English
- No. of series: 4
- No. of episodes: 37

Production
- Running time: 25 minutes
- Production company: LWT in association with The Samuel Goldwyn Company

Original release
- Network: ITV
- Release: 2 September 1995 – 13 March 1998

Related
- Scratchy & Co. Gladiators (1992–2000)

Gladiators: Train 2 Win is a children's spin-off of the British television series Gladiators and was based on its American counterpart Gladiators 2000 (1994–1996). Aired on ITV, the series featured younger contestants playing adapted versions of the games featured in the parent series, all while being mentored and assisted by a captain Gladiator. Four series of the programme were broadcast, airing from 2 September 1995 to 13 March 1998.

== Synopsis ==
The first series focused heavily on fitness education, and involved each of the young contenders answering questions relating to health and fitness while competing against each other playing specially adapted games. This series was presented by Sharron Davies, who at the time, was starring in the parent series as Amazon, and Daley Thompson. This series was initially broadcast on Saturday mornings as part of Scratchy & Co.

The second series heavily revised the format and it became much more like the main show. The series was moved to 4:40pm on Fridays, and the majority of the educational content was removed. Contenders now play in teams of two, each captained by a Gladiator. As many of the games featured Gladiator participation, the series was notable for being the first time that Gladiators had competed against one another in any form of domestic competition. Contenders competed in four events in each episode from a pool of six (See below). Like the main show every episode ended with the Eliminator. This format was retained for the third and fourth series. The second series was presented by the Gladiators themselves, working on rotation. Margherita Taylor and Kyran Bracken were appointed for the third series. Lee Sharpe replaced Bracken for the fourth and final series.

John Sachs acted as commentator for the first and second series, before being replaced by Mitch Johnson for the third and fourth series. Frank Dick was the referee for the first series, while John Anderson acted as referee for the second series, before timekeeper Andrew Norgate became referee for series three and four. Scripted commentary writers include: Andrew Whelan.

== Events ==
- Danger Zone: An adaptation of the parent event, in which the Gladiator captain acts as the contender, and has to run the Danger Zone whilst avoiding tennis balls being fired by a contender from the opposing team. The Gladiator does not have any weapons in this event, and simply must shield themselves using the four weapons stations. Each station explodes after five seconds. 5 points are awarded if the Gladiator makes it to the lower target. If they are hit, 1 point is awarded for each station reached.
- Skytrak: Both contenders and their Gladiator captains are attached to the Skytrak. The event acts as a relay race, with a member of the contender team running the first half of the course, and the Gladiator captain running the second half. The first team to cross the line receives 10 points. The runners-up receive 5 points.
- Hang Tough: Like Skytrak, Hang Tough acts as a relay race. One member of the contender team and their Gladiator captain each make one crossing of the Hang Tough grid, tagging the other when they reach the opposing platform. The first team to complete the relay receives 10 points. Again, the runners-up receive 5 points.
- The Wall: Again, The Wall acts as a relay race. One member of the contender team completes the first half of the wall, before tagging their Gladiator captain who is waiting on the overhang. The first team to make it to the top of the wall receive 10 points, the runners-up 5 points.
- Atlasphere Alley: A slight variation on the parent event, and similar to the format used in the South African series. One member of the contender team is mounted inside an Atlasphere. At the end of the area are ten giant bowling pins. The contender has to power the Atlasphere towards the pins, and 1 point is awarded for every pin that the contender manages to knock over.
- Pyramid: All three members of each team participate in this event. Jotted across the pyramid are pieces of a giant jigsaw puzzle. One by one, each member of the team has to collect an individual piece of the puzzle and assemble it on the arena floor. When the puzzle is complete, the Gladiator captain has to race to the top of the pyramid to collect the points. 10 points are awarded to the winner.
- Hit & Run: Adapted from the main event this version was played on crash mats rather than on the suspension bridge. Both team members from each team would compete. The aim was to pick up a ball and run on a designated path while trying to avoid the 4 demolition balls being swung by the opponsing teams Gladiator captain. The contender must place the ball in the scoring basket to earn 2 points. If the contender is knocked off the path or drops the ball the run is void and no score given. The team members takes alternate turns with a time limit of 60 seconds.
- Eliminator: The eliminator is designed as a tag-team event involving only the two contender members of each team. Unlike the parent version, The Eliminator is based more upon the Pursuit course, using obstacles such as the balance beams, wire bridge and hand ladder. It does however include some elements from the main series such as Spaghetti Junction (this element continues to be used after being removed from the main show), the balance beam, see-saws and travelator. Each contestant completes half of the course. The change over occurs at the half way point of the Hand Ladder. Like the parent series, the team with the most points receive a head start, depending on their points advantage. Every point is worth a half a second advantage.

== Transmissions ==
Series	Start date	End date	Episodes
1	2 September 1995	14 October 1995	7
2	5 January 1996	8 March 1996	10
3	10 January 1997	21 March 1997	10
4	9 January 1998	13 March 1998	10
