= Jane Omorogbe =

British model and actress

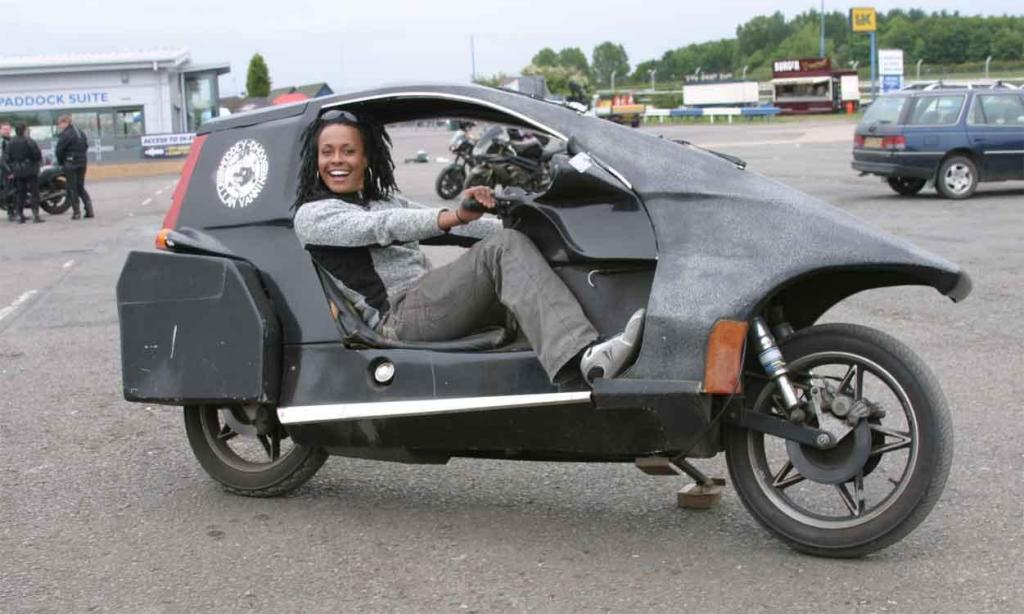
- Omorogbe poses in a Quasar motorbike
- Born: Jane Grace Isoken Omorogbe; 20 September 1971 (age 54); Newcastle upon Tyne, Tyne and Wear, England
- Education: Claverham Community College
- Occupations: model, actress, television presenter, motorcycling journalist and fitness coach
- Years active: 1995–present
- Employer(s): Sky Sports, The Sun, The Times, Global Biker
- Known for: Gladiators (1996–2000)
- Website: https://www.janeomorogbe.com/

Jane Grace Isoken Omorogbe (born 20 September 1971) is a British model and actress, best known as Rio on ITVs Gladiators. She had also worked as a television presenter, motorcycling journalist and fitness coach.

== Early life ==
Omorogbe was born on 20 September 1971 in Newcastle upon Tyne. Her family moved to Hastings, East Sussex, when she was five years old. Her parents are Nigerian immigrants and she is fluent in both English and Dutch.

Omorogbe was educated at Claverham Community College in Battle, East Sussex. After leaving school, Omorogbe briefly worked in a bank, then worked as a National Health Service (NHS) ambulance driver in Hastings for four years. She achieved a certificate in advanced first aid while working for the ambulance service.

== Modelling ==
Omorogbe modelled bridal gowns for Geddes-Muir Designs, and was signed by Martin Enterprises - Studio 17 modelling agency in 1994. In 1995, Omorogbe entered the Miss Wessex beauty contest. She won the title of Miss Wessex and was entered into the Miss United Kingdom final, although she didn't win the title.

== Television career ==
Omorogbe appeared in The Sun as a finalist in Miss United Kingdom, where she was spotted by Gladiators referee John Anderson, and was asked to audition for the cult television show. She was not considered fit or strong enough, so she quit her ambulance job and left Hastings to focus on training with a Taekwando expert in order to pass the rigorous fitness test required by London Weekend Television. After five months of training, Omorogbe passed the tests for the show and became the Gladiator "Rio." As Rio, Omorogbe had a high win count, crashed into a contender so hard in one episode that a door jammed, and in series 5 was dubbed "the undefeated Queen of Duel." During her time on Gladiators, she also appeared as Rio in festive pantomimes, and was a guest on television shows such as Fully Booked and the Generation Game. She also worked as a stuntwoman on the Ridley Scott film Gladiator (2000), starring as the gold breastplate wearing gladiatrix and archer who is in sliced half by a barbed chariot wheel during a battle in the Colosseum.

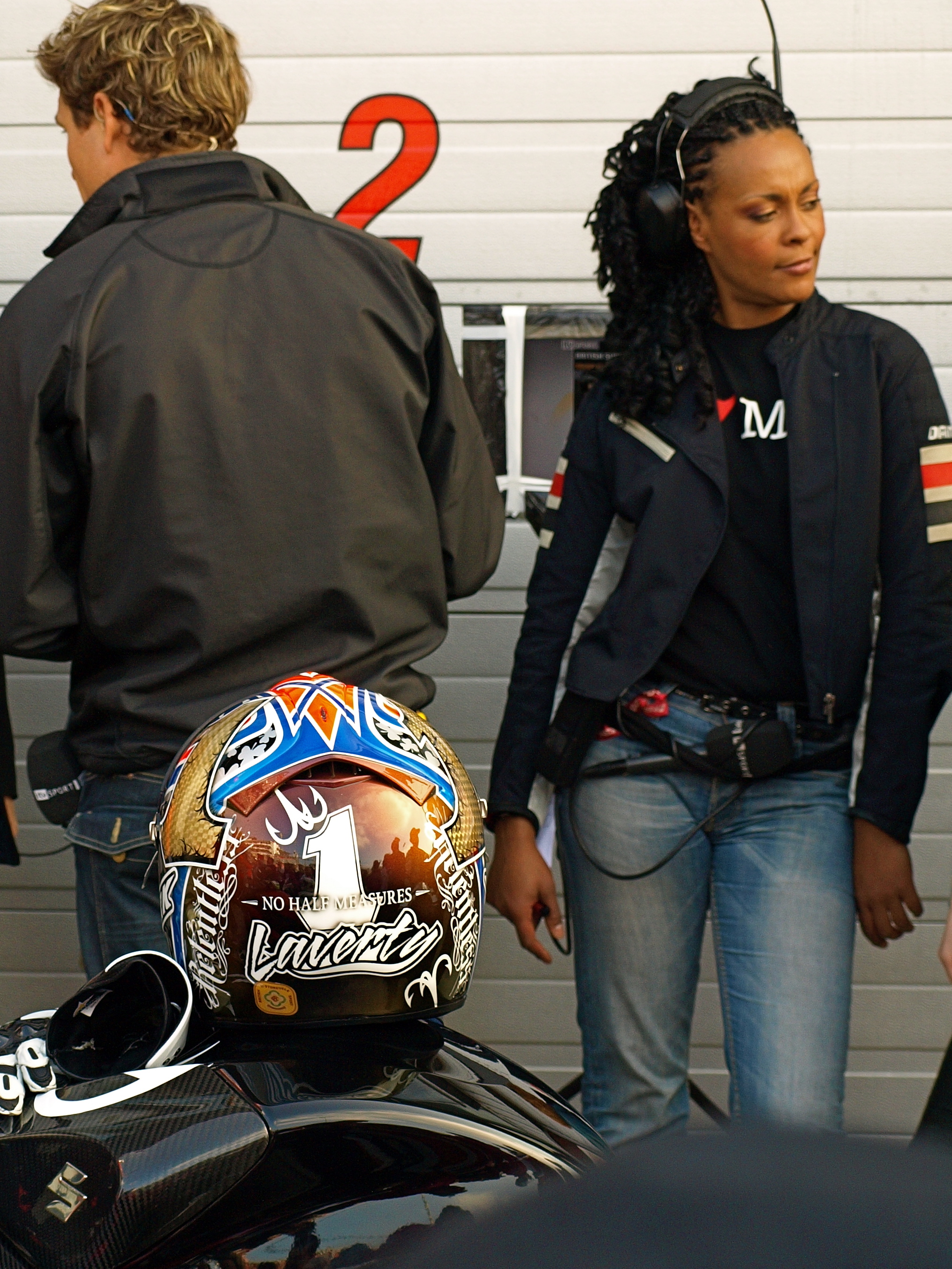
Omorogbe and James Cracknell presenting at the British SuperBike Championship in 2007

After taking part in six series of Gladiators from 1996 until 2000, Omorogbe turned her love of motorbikes into a television career. She presented numerous television shows in quick succession to gain experience, including Car Crazy Rio, Top Bikes, Two Wheels, Revved Up, Teen Trials, Top Gear, Pit Stop Bikes, and Pulling Power.

Like Suzi Perry and Fran Robinson before her, Omorogbe was the pit-side reporter for Live Speedway on Sky Sports. She also became the Grid and Pitside Reporter for ITV's British Touring Car Championship coverage, having covered British Superbike Championship for them and also covered the annual Isle of Man TT Races. Omorogbe also worked as an interviewer for Men and Motors. For the channel, she interviewed attendees at the 2001 Max Power Live Motor Show in Birmingham to investigate why people spend so much money to add extras on their vehicles, tested vehicles, and interviewed celebrities such as Jeremy Clarkson. Her other televisions roles include presenting House Race for ITV with Mike Brewer.

In 2024, Omorogbe was interviewed by GladPod: The Gladiators Podcast. When former Gladiators referee John Anderson died, also in 2024, she tweeted: "this man literally changed my life in one simple phone call. Forever grateful. Thank you for believing in something I couldn't see."

== Writing ==
Omorogbe became a motorbike journalist in 2001. Omorogbe became the main motorbike reporter for The Sun and The Times newspapers, and launched the iPad magazine Global Biker in 2013. She wrote motorbike reviews for the Press Association. These reviews were published by a variety of publications, including the motorbike section of MSN Cars, and for local publications such as The Coventry Evening Telegraph, Guernsey Press, and The South Wales Argus.

Omorogbe retired from journalism in 2016. As of 2025, she works as a strength, nutrition and mindset coach.
