= Gladiators (1992 British TV series) =

British television game show

- Genre: Game show
- Based on: American Gladiators by: Dann Carr; John Ferraro
- Presented by: Ulrika Jonsson; John Fashanu; Jeremy Guscott
- Narrated by: John Sachs (voiceover)
- Country of origin: United Kingdom
- Original language: English
- No. of series: 8 (Main series); 2 (International Gladiators); 2 (The Ashes); 1 (Springbok Challenge)
- No. of episodes: 112 (Main series); 14 (International Gladiators); 6 (The Ashes); 3 (The Springbok Challenge)

Production
- Production locations: National Indoor Arena, Birmingham, England
- Camera setup: Multi-camera
- Running time: 60 minutes (inc. adverts)
- Production company: LWT Productions in association with The Samuel Goldwyn Company

Original release
- Network: ITV
- Release: 10 October 1992 – 1 January 2000

Related
- Gladiators: Train 2 Win (1995–1998); Gladiators (2008–2009); Gladiators (2024–present)

Gladiators is a British sports entertainment game show, produced by LWT, presented by Ulrika Jonsson and narrated by John Sachs, and originally broadcast on ITV. Based upon the American television programme American Gladiators, the show sees four contestants, split into pairs by gender, compete in a series of physically challenging events against the show's resident "Gladiators", before competing against their respective contestant in one final event. Each series functions like a tournament, with the winner of that year's competition being crowned champion for their respective gender.

During its original run, between 10 October 1992 and 1 January 2000, Jonsson presented the programme alongside two different co-presenters, John Fashanu and Jeremy Guscott, with Sachs providing commentary on each event, and John Anderson serving as referee for each event. The show proved popular for ITV, spawning a media franchise with other countries, a children's spin-off titled Gladiators: Train 2 Win, merchandise, a series of live arena shows and inspired the 1998 ITV game show Ice Warriors. Despite its popularity, the show courted several controversies during its history, particularly with some of its Gladiators, while falling viewing numbers led to the programme being cancelled after eight series, including five special series.

Gladiators has since received two revivals after its conclusion. The first revival was created in 2008 for Sky1, running for two series but with changes to the format. The second revival, which began airing on 13 January 2024 on BBC One and BBC iPlayer, returned to the original format with a brand new set of Gladiators. This Revival remains active and successful as of 2026, with a third Series (The 13th overall for the franchise) airing as of January 2026 and a fourth Series confirmed for 2027.

== Format ==
In Gladiators, participating contestants competed in a series of physically challenging events, the majority of which saw them faring against the show's resident Gladiators, in order to win against their opponents. Each episode featured four contestants – two men and two women – who competed in events within their respective genders. All contestants seeking to participate in a series were screened and required to undergo a series of rigorous fitness tests before they were selected to take part:

Gladiators Entry Test

- Bike – 1 km
- Rowing – 500m
- Benchpress – 40 kg
- Treadmill – 800m
- Pressups – 30 reps

All of the events they faced were designed to test their strength and endurance, with the majority of these having seen them compete against not only each other but against a Gladiator chosen to face off against them; the exception was the final event, the Eliminator – an assault course upon which each pair of contestants competed against each other directly without hindrance from the Gladiators, in order to determine that episode's male and female winners. Winning contestants, who began in the heats, moved on to quarter-finals and semi-finals, until only four were left for the grand final, in which the winners were crowned the champions of the series for their respective gender.

For the main events of the show, the contestants focused on scoring points while competing against the clock. In these events, their rules dictated how points were earned, whether a contestant was on their own or competing against each other in their gender, and whether the Gladiator(s) impeded contestants or could directly defeat them and thus prevent them winning points. All events were overseen by a referee who could stop proceedings if a Gladiator or contestant was not following the rules or if safety gear had accidentally come off during the event; the referee could also disqualify contestants and Gladiators if a breach of the rules occurred during the event.

For most events, ten points was awarded if the contestant won the event, and five points if they came runner-up or hold out until time ran out on the event – an example of this was in Duel: the contestant won ten points for defeating the Gladiator, or five points if they could stay in position until time ran out. For other events, the points were based on the scores achieved in the event. After the final Gladiator-involved event was completed, the contestant in each pair who was in the lead received a timed head start for the Eliminator, based on the point difference between the pair. This head start was calculated as half a second for each point by which they led; thus, a contestant with a five-point lead, for example, began with a 2.5 second head start on their opponent.

Most series had a total of fifteen episodes allotted to them, with events randomised for each episode; the exception was the first series. Series regularly saw changes in events, with new ones added in over its history, and existing ones being modified or removed for safety reasons, with the number of events dictated by time constraints depending on the timeslot given to the programme by ITV. Alongside the main series, Gladiators occasionally featured a celebrity or charity special after the grand final, alongside five different specials with fewer episodes than the main series. By the seventh series, the show included behind-the-scenes aspects, including clips of the contenders selections, and training as well as clips showing the contenders choosing which Gladiator they would face on a certain game via coin toss.

== Cast ==
=== Presenters ===
Throughout the show's history, Gladiators was primarily presented by Ulrika Jonsson, following her departure from ITV's breakfast show TV-am in the early 1990s, with commentary on the events handled by John Sachs. For the first five series, Jonsson was accompanied by former professional footballer John Fashanu as her co-presenter, despite him not having any hosting experience. After his departure following the fifth series, Fashanu was replaced for the sixth and seventh series by former professional rugby union player Jeremy Guscott; when the game show came to its close, Fashanu returned to co-present with Jonsson to its eighth and final series.

=== Referee ===
Because the game show relied on sports-like events for challenging contestants, Gladiators required a referee to oversee the competition. For this role, production hired on John Anderson, whose background in sports coaching made him perfect for the task at hand. Throughout the show's history, he took his work seriously, although with a light-hearted attitude when overseeing celebrity and charity specials. While he maintained and enforced the rules, he was accompanied by an assistant who kept official count of the event's time; the role was primarily filled by the associate producer Andrew Norgate.

=== The Gladiators ===
The titular "Gladiators" for the show were groups of men and women, mainly bodybuilders and athletes, auditioned by the production staff to provide an additional challenge for contestants – often with notable differences to them in terms of height and weight. While most were recruited before the show began, some Gladiators were chosen after initially applying to be contestants on the show or who had competed originally in the live shows. All participating Gladiators had their own identity, and, until 1998, had specially-designed uniforms reflecting that identity.

The following below is a list of Gladiators per gender, their real name, and their appearances in the main series and live shows:

Female Gladiators
Character	Portrayed by	Domestic series	International series	Live shows
Amazon	Sharron Davies	series 4	—N/a	Wembley 1996
Blaze	Eunice Huthart	—N/a	—N/a	Sheffield 1995
Falcon	Bernadette Hunt	series 2–8	International Gladiators 1–2, The Ashes 2 (reserve)	Wembley 1994, Sheffield 1995, Wembley 1996
Flame	Kimbra LeAnne Standish	series 1	—N/a	Wembley 1993
Fox	Tammy Baker	series 6–8	—N/a	The Royal Tournament 1998
Gold	Lize Van der Walt	series 6	—N/a	—N/a
Jet	Diane Youdale	series 1–4	International Gladiators 1–2, The Ashes 1	Wembley 1993–1994, Sheffield 1995, Wembley 1996
Laser	Tina Andrew	series 5	The Ashes 2, Springbok Challenge	—N/a
Lightning	Kim Betts	series 1–8	International Gladiators 1–2, The Ashes 1–2, Springbok Challenge	Wembley 1993–1994, Sheffield 1995, Wembley 1996
Nightshade	Judy Simpson	series 2–5	International Gladiators 1–2, The Ashes 1	Wembley 1994, Sheffield 1995, Wembley 1996
Panther	Helen O'Reilly	series 1–5	International Gladiators 1–2	Wembley 1993–1994, Sheffield 1995, Wembley 1996
Phoenix	Sandy Young	series 1	—N/a	Wembley 1993
Rebel	Jennifer Stoute	series 5–8	Springbok Challenge	Wembley 1996, The Royal Tournament 1997
Rio	Jane Omorogbe	series 5–8	The Ashes 2, Springbok Challenge	Wembley 1996
Rocket	Pauline Richards	series 6	Springbok Challenge	The Royal Tournament 1998
Scorpio	Nikki Diamond	series 1–3	International Gladiators 1	Wembley 1993–1994
Siren	Alison Paton	series 6–8	—N/a	—N/a
Vogue	Suzanne Cox	series 4–8	International Gladiators 2; The Ashes 1–2, Springbok Challenge	Sheffield 1995, Wembley 1996
Zodiac	Kate Staples	series 2–5	International Gladiators 1–2	Wembley 1993–1994, Sheffield 1995, Wembley 1996

Male Gladiators
Character	Portrayed by	Domestic series	International series	Live shows
Ace	Warren Furman	series 5–8	The Ashes 2, Springbok Challenge	Wembley 1996
Bullit	Mike Harvey	—N/a	—N/a	Wembley 1993
Cobra	Michael Willson	series 1–8	International Gladiators 1–2, Springbok Challenge	Wembley 1993–1994, Sheffield 1995, Wembley 1996
Diesel	Daz Crawford	series 7–8	—N/a	—N/a
Hawk	Aleks Georgijev	series 1	—N/a	Wembley 1993
Hunter	James Crossley	series 2–8	International Gladiators 1–2, The Ashes 1–2, Springbok Challenge	Wembley 1994, Sheffield 1995, Wembley 1996, The Royal Tournament 1997–1998
Khan	Radosev Nekic	series 6	—N/a	The Royal Tournament 1998
Raider	Carlton Headley	series 4	International Gladiators 2	Sheffield 1995
Rhino	Mark Smith	series 4–8	International Gladiators 2, The Ashes 1–2, Springbok Challenge	Sheffield 1995, Wembley 1996, The Royal Tournament 1997
Saracen	Mike Lewis	series 1–8	International Gladiators 1, The Ashes 2, Springbok Challenge	Wembley 1993–1994, Sheffield 1995, Wembley 1996
Shadow	Jefferson King	series 1–3	International Gladiators 1	Wembley 1993–1994
Trojan	Mark Griffin	series 2–5	International Gladiators 1–2	Wembley 1993–1994, Sheffield 1995, Wembley 1996
Vulcan	John Seru	series 7–8	International Gladiators 2, The Ashes 1–2, Australian Gladiators 1–3	—N/a
Warrior	Michael Ahearne	series 1–6	International Gladiators 1–2, The Ashes 1	Wembley 1993–1994, Sheffield 1995, Wembley 1996, The Royal Tournament 1997
Wolf	Michael Van Wijk	series 1–8	International Gladiators 1–2, The Ashes 1–2, Springbok Challenge	Wembley 1993–1994, Sheffield 1995, Wembley 1996, The Royal Tournament 1997

==== Injuries ====
Working as a Gladiator carried significant risks in events, with several of those who partook in the show later retiring after suffering serious injury in competition, whether during the series, or during the live shows. The most significant retirement was that of Helen O'Reilly (Panther) – during an event that was televised, she suffered a serious accident when she fell head first onto crash mats in the game Tilt, receiving severe neck and back injuries; while she recovered and later returned, she was forced to retire when the effects of the accident caused problems. Other retirements caused by injuries included:

- Diane Youdale (Jet), who suffered a neck injury while partaking in Pyramid during a live show in 1996; the incident led to the event being discontinued.
- Sharron Davies (Amazon), who received a severe knee injury in 1996 whilst training for that year's series.
- Kate Staples (Zodiac), who was forced to leave the show after the 1996 series having suffered an injury during training for an event.
- Judy Simpson (Nightshade), who contracted a severe virus during the Australian special in 1995; she was forced to leave the show the following year, after making sparse appearances.

== Series Champions ==
The following is a list of series winners for each gender, plus those series' runners-up:

Gladiators series champions
Series		Female	Male
1	Winner	Vanda Fairchild	Weininger Irwin
1	Runner-up	Jane Morris	Kym Dalton
2	Winner	Jean Klenk	Phil Norman
2	Runner-up	Georgina Berger	Brian Ward
3	Winner	Eunice Huthart	Paul Field
3	Runner-up	Kerryn Sampey	Phil Campbell (Note: Sam Codjoe reached the series 3 final. However, he was injured at the beginning of Powerball, the fourth game of the night, as a result of a mistimed tackle from Shadow, and was replaced by Phil Campbell (whom he defeated in his semi-final). The £2,000 runner-up prize was split equally between the two, as both were deemed to have competed in three games.)
4	Winner	Janet Allen	Mark Everitt
4	Runner-up	Mandy Beacher	Regan Pilkington
5	Winner	Andreya Wharry	Mark Mottram
5	Runner-up	Sarah Damm	Buster Reeves
6	Winner	Audrey Garland	Piers Bryant
6	Runner-up	Wendy Famiglietti	Adam Stretton
7	Winner	Jane Smith	Dave Walter
7	Runner-up	Louise Raines	Neil Parsley
8	Winner	Jane Smith	Dave Walter
8	Runner-up	Andreya Wharry	Mark Everitt

== Filming ==
The majority of episodes for Gladiators, with the special series of International Gladiators, the second series of The Ashes, and the first series of Springbok Challenge, were filmed within the National Indoor Arena in Birmingham, whose ITV provider is Central; the show itself was made by LWT. For the first series of The Ashes and The Springbok Challenge II series, both were filmed at locations in Australia and South Africa, respectively.

== Controversies ==
Despite the show's popularity, Gladiators faced a number of controversies during its broadcast:

- In 1992, Nikki Diamond (Scorpio) complained to John Anderson that a contender had cheated during the first run of the "Wall" event. Nicola Bawden, who she was tasked with impeding in the event, was found to have greased her legs before it began; she herself later admitted to this when questioned. Although he allowed Bawden to proceed further in that year's competition, Anderson ruled her actions were not in the spirit of competition and later had new rules implemented to prevent any other contestants for using the same tactic.
- In 1993, the series director Nigel Lythgoe was heavily criticised for firing Sandy Young (Phoenix), Kimbra LeAnne Standish (Flame), and Aleks Georgijev (Hawk) following the Wembley live shows. The decision was made following a magazine poll with the show's fans, which revealed all three Gladiators had received a poor reception during their time on the show, at that point being only the first series. The decision drew harsh criticism from TV critics, who deemed their dismissal as unfair.
- In 1994, a newspaper investigation uncovered rumours that Jefferson King (Shadow) was taking steroids while participating in the show. Production staff later confronted him over the allegations, which he confirmed were true. After testing positive for steroids, he was fired from Gladiators.
- In 1997, Michael Ahearne (Warrior) became implicated in a plot to foil the prosecution of Philip Glennon Jnr, who was being tried at the time for a serious firearm offence in 1996. The revelation caused a media scandal, forcing production staff to fire him for his involvement in disrupting Glennon's trial.

== Transmissions ==
=== Domestic ===
Series	Start date	End date	Episodes
1	10 October 1992	5 December 1992	9
2	18 September 1993	1 January 1994	15
3	10 September 1994	17 December 1994	15
4	16 September 1995	23 December 1995	15
5	28 September 1996	4 January 1997	15
6	13 September 1997 (Note: The sixth series was scheduled to debut on 6 September 1997, but was postponed to the following week due to programme changes following the funeral of Diana, Princess of Wales.)	20 December 1997	15
7	5 September 1998	12 December 1998	15
8	11 December 1999	1 January 2000	3

=== Specials ===
Date	Entitle
9 January 1993	The Challenge Of The Gladiators
28 August 1993	Return Of The Gladiators
26 December 1993	The Battle Of The Gladiators
3 September 1994	The Return
24 December 1994	The Celebrity Challenge
31 December 1994	The Fighting Forces Challenge
20 January 1996	Battle Of The Champions
11 January 1997	Sport Celebrity Challenge
27 December 1997	Celebrities vs. Jockeys
25 December 1999	Battle Of The Giants

=== International ===
Series	Start date	End date	Episodes
1	7 January 1995	18 February 1995	7
2	20 April 1996	8 June 1996	7

=== The Ashes ===
Series	Start date	End date	Episodes
1	30 December 1995	13 January 1996	3
2	18 January 1997	1 February 1997	3

=== Springbok Challenge ===
Series	Start date	End date	Episodes
1	3 January 1998	17 January 1998	3

== Live shows ==
For four years, a series of 'live' shows were played in the spring ahead of the recording of the main televised series. These shows were used to test new event concepts and new Gladiators.

=== 1993 ===
- Venue: Wembley Arena, London, England
- Presenters: John Fashanu and Ulrika Jonsson
- Female Gladiators: Flame, Jet, Lightning, Panther, Phoenix, Scorpio, Zodiac
- Male Gladiators: Bullit, Cobra, Hawk, Saracen, Shadow, Trojan, Warrior, Wolf
- Referee: John Anderson
- Timekeeper: Andrew Norgate
- Dates: 26–28 March

The first set of live shows was used to test three new potential events ahead of the televised series. One of the events, Tilt, would be used in the televised series with little modification. Joust was also tested in this series with pugil sticks being used, but the skybikes were much larger and lower to the ground than the event's ultimate appearance in the televised series. A third new event taken from the American series, Breakthrough and Conquer, was also tested, but would not be taken on to the main TV shows. An "updated version" of Duel on a rocking suspension bridge using pugil sticks was also played, and this format would be modified and played as a new game called Suspension Bridge in the 1993 televised series. Atlaspheres, The Wall and the Eliminator were also played.

Three new Gladiators, Bullit, Trojan and Zodiac, were included in these shows. For unknown reasons, Bullit did not appear in the televised series (though would finally appear in a Legends episode of the 2008 revival series). These shows would be the last to feature Flame, Phoenix and Hawk, who were dropped before the 1993 televised series.

Some of the contenders from these shows went on to be in the televised shows. One of the contenders, Tammy Baker, would later become a Gladiator, Fox, from 1997.

Highlights from these shows were shown in a preview episode to the 1993 series, and whilst footage of him playing was included, there was no specific reference to Bullit (or Flame, Phoenix, and Hawk).

=== 1994 ===
- Venue: Wembley Arena, London, England
- Presenters: John Fashanu and Ulrika Jonsson
- Female Gladiators: Falcon, Jet, Lightning, Nightshade, Panther, Scorpio, Zodiac
- Male Gladiators: Cobra, Hunter, Saracen, Shadow, Trojan, Warrior, Wolf
- Referee: John Anderson
- Timekeeper: Derek Redmond
- Dates:1–4 April

This set of live shows saw the entire 1993 team return. Cobra suffered an ankle injury during the shows, and had to withdraw. Only one new event was tested in this series, Cannonball Run, which was later used in the 1994 televised series under the name Hit & Run. Atlaspheres, The Wall, Powerball, Hang Tough, Duel, and the Eliminator were also played.

Some of the contenders from these shows went on to be in the televised shows.

=== 1995 ===
- Venue: Sheffield Arena, Sheffield, South Yorkshire, England
- Presenters: John Fashanu and Ulrika Jonsson
- Female Gladiators: Blaze, Falcon, Jet, Lightning, Nightshade, Panther, Vogue, Zodiac
- Male Gladiators: Cobra, Hunter, Raider, Rhino, Saracen, Trojan, Warrior, Wolf
- Referee: John Anderson
- Timekeeper: Andrew Norgate

Four new Gladiators were introduced in these shows over Easter 1995, with Raider, Rhino, and Vogue subsequently going on to take part in The Ashes series in Brisbane shortly afterwards, before taking part in the 1995 televised series. The third new Gladiator, Blaze, was the 1994 female champion and International Gladiators 1 champion Eunice Huthart; however, following these shows, Huthart wanted to compete as a UK challenger for The Ashes series, and stepped down as a Gladiator.

Unlike the other live shows, these shows took place in Sheffield Arena in the north of England, which was smaller than the NIA in Birmingham. Pendulum had been intended to be tested in these shows, but Sheffield Arena was too small to fit the safety net. Instead, Joust was played despite it being one of the least used events in the televised series, and only making one appearance in the 1995 televised series before being axed. Powerball, Pyramid, Duel, Gauntlet and Atlaspheres were also played, with Saracen injuring his knee during Powerball.

=== 1996 ===
- Venue: Wembley Arena, London, England
- Presenters: John Fashanu and Ulrika Jonsson
- Female Gladiators: Amazon, Falcon, Jet, Lightning, Nightshade, Panther, Rebel, Rio, Vogue, Zodiac
- Male Gladiators: Ace, Cobra, Hunter, Rhino, Saracen, Trojan, Warrior, Wolf
- Referee: John Anderson
- Timekeeper: Andrew Norgate
- Dates: 11–14 April
- Number of shows: 7

The final set of live shows saw the introduction of Ace, Rebel, and Rio as Gladiators; all of whom would go on to appear in that years' main televised series. Jet would suffer an injury during Pyramid, in which she fell awkwardly trapping nerves in her neck and she retired from competition after this event. Amazon, who herself sustained an injured knee on Pyramid, would quit between these shows and the 1996 televised series. Pyramid itself would be axed following both these injuries and a leg injury to Rhino during filming of the event on International Gladiators 2 the year before.

Sumo Ball was tested in these shows, and would feature as the only new event of the 1996 main televised series. Other events played were Atlaspheres, Powerball, Gauntlet, Hang Tough, and the Eliminator.

=== Royal Tournaments ===
In 1997 and 1998, a short segment of Gladiators was introduced to the Royal Tournament event at Earls Court after London Weekend Television won the broadcasting rights from the BBC. Duel would feature in the 1997 Royal Tournament, and Pursuit featured in the 1998 Royal Tournament, despite it having been axed after the 1996 series. Hunter, Rhino, Ace, Rio and Vogue took part in the 1997 Royal Tournament. For its Royal Tournament appearance, Pursuit saw a ten-second head-start (rather than three) for the contenders with the course being a sprint round a cone, web trap (over), low wall, web trap (under), hand ladder, high wall, sprint round a cone, spaghetti junction (used in the Eliminator in 1996), and sprint finish. The balance beam and wire bridge from the televised series course were not used. Fox, Rocket, Khan, Wolf, Falcon, Vogue, Saracen and Hunter took part in the shows, despite Rocket and Khan not appearing in the 1998 series, and the Gladiators (except Hunter) not having had chance to play Pursuit in the televised series.

== Merchandise ==
During the show's first three series, popular model makers Hornby made a selection of action figures and playsets based on the TV show.

The first release of figures consisted of Jet (B800), Shadow (B801), Wolf (B802), Saracen (B803), Cobra (B804), Warrior (B805), and generic figures of a Male Contender (B806) and Female Contender (B807). The first wave of playsets included Duel (B821, which contained American-style Ramrods), Atlasphere Attack (B822, which contained a yellow Atlasphere and a Wolf figure), Danger Zone (B823, with Warrior figure), Atlasphere Challenge (B824, blue and red Atlaspheres with Cobra and Male Contender figures), Super Duel (B825, with Shadow and Male Contender figures), and The Ultimate Challenge (B826, which contains all of the above). B823 was due to include a Hawk Action figure, but owing to his departure from the show, a figure was never released.

The second release of figures included Trojan (B815), Hunter (B816), Zodiac (B817), and Panther (B818), as well as revised versions of Jet (B800) and Wolf (B802). A second wave of playsets included The Wall (B827).

A final set of figures was released for the first International Gladiators series. These consisted of a revised version of Hunter, and figures of Hawk (United States), Terminator (Finland), and Dynamite (Russia). In 1995, McDonald's gave away an exclusive range of figures through a Happy Meal promotion. These consisted of new models of Trojan, Wolf, Jet, Lightning, and the previously unreleased Rhino. Notably, many of the moulds for the Hornby series were shipped over to Australia, and reused for a range of Australian Gladiators figures. While the Male Contender remained the same, Taipan has an identical head to Wolf, and Vulcan shares an identical head to Saracen. Figures of Tower, Commander, Condor, and Hammer were also released, with an identical "Duel" playset.

Alongside these popular models and play sets, everything from decorative display plates to clocks were released. Two audio CD and audio cassette tape compilations were released during the early years of the show, containing tracks such as "Holding Out for a Hero", "We Are Family", and "The Boys Are Back in Town", as well as the instrumental music used during events, and a three-minute version of the programme's opening theme song.

== VHS releases ==
During the show's first four series, a number of official VHS video cassette tapes were released by Clear Vision (with some released through their Silver Vision label). These contained episodes, specials, or other material exclusive for home release. Many quickly sold out and are rare. The following VHS releases were available:

- GL001 – Into the Arena – contains heats 1 and 2 from series 1 (1992)
- GL002 – Powerplay – contains heats 3 and 4 from series 1 (1992)
- GL003 – The Conflict – contains heats 5 and 6 from series 1 (1992)
- GL004 – Countdown – contains semi-finals 1 and 2 from series 1 (1992)
- GL005 – The Ultimate Challenge – contains the grand final from series 1 (1992)
- GL006 – The Very Best of Gladiators – contains the special episode 'The Challenge of the Gladiators' (1993)
- GL007 – Gladiators Return – contains the special episode 'Return of the Gladiators' (1993)
- GL008 – Contenders Ready, Gladiators Ready – contains heats 1 and 2 from series 2 (1993)
- GL009 – Arena Attack – contains heats 3, 4, and 5 from series 2 (1993)
- GL010 – Battleground – contains heats 6, 7, and 8 from series 2 (1993)
- GL011 – Combat – contains quarter finals 1 to 4 from series 2 (1993)
- GL012 – The Ultimate Challenge '93 – contains semi-finals 1 and 2 and the grand final from series 2, plus the special episode 'The Battle of the Gladiators' (1993)
- GL013 – The Climax – contains semi-finals 1 and 2, plus the grand final from series 3 (1994), plus footage from the 'International Challenge of Champions I' (1993)
- GL014 – The Gladiators Challenge '94–'95 – contains the special episodes 'The Return', 'The Celebrity Challenge', and 'The Fighting Forces Challenge' (1994)
- GL015 – International Gladiators: The Showdown – contains semi-finals 1 and 2, plus the grand final from International Gladiators I (1994)
- GL016 – The Power To Win – contains the special episode 'The Power To Win' (1995)
- SV001 – Jet: A Video Profile – contains the special episode 'Jet: a video profile' (1995)

== Demise and cancellation ==
By 1998, viewing figures began to fall, and despite efforts to improve the programme with changes, Gladiators was axed on 15 February 1999. Director of programmes David Liddiment said: "Every show of this kind has a lifespan, and it's now time for ITV to move on." However, LWT reached an agreement by this time to film four extra episodes for ONdigital, the recently launched digital terrestrial television platform. These episodes were filmed in spring 1999, and saw the return of original host John Fashanu. These consisted of a three-part mini-series, in which previous winners competed to be crowned "Supreme Gladiators Champion", and a one-off special entitled "Battle of the Giants", where male gladiators competed against each other for the title of Ultimate Gladiator.

The four episodes were first broadcast back-to-back on 29 May 1999 on First ONdigital, an exclusive free channel on the ONdigital platform for special events and programmes. The episodes were then shown nationally on the ITV network over the Christmas period, across four successive Saturday nights from 11 December 1999 to 1 January 2000. The ITV broadcast of the final episode on Millennium Day 2000 attracted just more than six million viewers.

== Subsequent versions ==
=== Children's spin-off ===
In 1996, ITV commissioned a spin-off of Gladiators for young children, titled Gladiators: Train 2 Win. Based upon Gladiators 2000, the children's version of American Gladiators, the spin-off was broadcast on CITV for four series between 1995 and 1998. Unlike the main show, the children's version featured two teams of children, who competed in modified versions of existing events while captained by one of the main show's Gladiators, who would sometimes assist in events. The show itself was filmed at National Indoor Arena, with John Sachs and John Anderson reprising their roles for the programme for the first two series, before later being replaced in their roles by Mitch Johnson and Andrew Norgate, respectively.

=== Sky One revival ===
In January 2008, satellite TV channel Sky One announced they were commissioning a UK revival of Gladiators, following in the wake of its American counterparts revival. Produced by the company Shine, the show underwent a major change in its format due to the channel's advertising requirements, reducing the number of events featured in each episode, while some of the original events, like Duel, were modified due to the arena studio used for the revival. Michael Van Wijk, who had portrayed Wolf in the original series, took part in the revived series as coach for the new selection of Gladiators.

The revival ran for two series between 2008 and 2009, but was axed on 20 May 2009 by the then newly appointed controller for Sky One, Stuart Murphy.

=== BBC revival ===
In July 2022, the BBC was reported to be in talks with Metro-Goldwyn-Mayer, the holder of the Gladiators franchise, in hopes of relaunching the show on BBC One, with intentions of starting filming the following year. A month later, the BBC confirmed that Gladiators would return to British television, with production handled by Hungry Bear Media and MGM Television, and filming taking place in Sheffield's Utilita Arena.

Several of the new Gladiators for the second revival were later revealed on various daytime TV shows throughout August, but the BBC's plan to launch the show in 2023 was delayed. On 16 December 2023, the BBC announced, during the Strictly Come Dancing final, that the revival would begin broadcasting soon after the start of 2024. In January 2024, the presenters for the revival were revealed as Bradley Walsh and his son Barney.

The second revival eventually began broadcasting on 13 January 2024, achieving very strong viewing figures for its opening episodes, and received positive feedback from critics and fans since its launch. Owing to the surprising success of the revival, the BBC commissioned a second series, broadcast in 2025, and a third, broadcast in 2026. With a fourth now also expected to air in 2027.

== See also ==
- Gladiators (franchise)
