= Sha-ri Pendleton =

American hurdler, javelin thrower, and bodybuilder (born 1963)

- Professional bodybuilder

Personal info
- Nickname: Blaze
- Born: December 5, 1963 (age 62); Los Angeles, California, United States

Best statistics
- Height: 5 ft 8 in (1.73 m)
- Weight: (In Season) 140-145 lb (Off-Season) 155-160 lb

Professional (Pro) career
- Pro-debut: ABBC Natural International Championships; 1984
- Best win: ABBC Natural International Champion (HW and overall); 1988
- Predecessor: No predecessor
- Successor: TBA
- Active: 1984-1989

Sha-ri Pendleton (born December 5, 1963) is an American hurdler, javelin thrower, and bodybuilder of the mid-to-late 1980s. Under the stage name Blaze, she competed as a gladiator on the American TV show American Gladiators from 1989 to 1992.

== Biography ==
At the age of 12, Pendleton joined the West Vernon Jets track and field team in Los Angeles, California. She initially competed in the 220 and 440 events, later adding the 200 and 400 meter events. In high school, she added hurdles, winning the city championships two years in a row. At the age of 16, she began weight lifting.

After graduating high school, Pendleton enrolled in the University of Nebraska–Lincoln on an athletic scholarship. Following her graduation from college, she returned to California, where she was coached by Bob Kersee and trained with the World Class Track Club of UCLA.

During this time, she began entering and competing in bodybuilding competitions, placing second at the Nebraska Championships in 1984 and fourth at the 1989 Los Angeles Championships. However, she retired from competition to focus on training and competing at the Olympic Games.

Pendleton wanted to compete at the 1988 Olympics, but withdrew after suffered a pulled hamstring. For the 1992 Summer Olympics, she sought to make the javelin team.

In 1989, Pendleton joined cast of American Gladiators as the gladiator Blaze and competed for three years until 1992.

== Contest history ==
- 1984 Nebraska Championships 2nd
- 1986 The Pride of LA 1st
- 1988 Los Angeles Championships 4th
- 1988 ABBC Natural International Championships 1st (Tall), and Overall Winner
- 1989 Los Angeles Championships 4th
- 1989 NPC Los Angeles Championships 5th (HW)

== Filmography ==
- 1989-1992: American Gladiators (TV series) - Blaze
- 1993: Renegade (TV) - as Cannon (credited as Sha-Ri Mitchell)
- 1995: The Alien Within - as Fife
- 1999: Hard Time: The Premonition (TV) - as Vinnie
- 2000: Knockout - as a Female Boxer
- 2023: Muscles & Mayhem: An Unauthorized Story of American Gladiators
