= Zoe Williams =

Zoe Williams may refer to:

- Zoe Williams (writer) (born 1973), Welsh columnist, journalist, and author
- Zoe Williams (physician) (born 1980), English television personality and doctor
- Zoey Williams, Canadian pilot
