= American Gladiators (1989 TV series) =

American television program

- The first American Gladiators logo, from 1989 to 1993
- Genre: Sports/Game show
- Created by: John Ferraro
- Directed by: Bob Levy
- Presented by: Mike Adamle (1989–1996); with; Joe Theismann (1989); Todd Christensen (1990); Larry Csonka (1990–1993); Lisa Malosky (1993–1995); Danny Lee Clark (1995–1996)
- Announcer: Joe Theismann (1989); John Harlan (1990–1993)
- Theme music composer: Bill Conti
- Country of origin: United States
- No. of seasons: 7
- No. of episodes: 208

Production
- Executive producers: Ron Ziskin; Shukri Ghalayini
- Producers: J. Brian Gadinsky; Eythan Keller
- Camera setup: Multi-camera
- Running time: 60 minutes
- Production companies: Trans World International; (1989–1992); Four Point Entertainment; The Samuel Goldwyn Company; MGM Television

Original release
- Network: Syndication
- Release: September 9, 1989 – May 11, 1996

Related
- American Gladiators (2008); Battle Dome (1999); American Gladiators (2026)

American Gladiators is an American competition television program that aired weekly in syndication from September 1989 to May 1996. The series matched a cast of amateur athletes against each other, as well as against the show's own "gladiators", in contests of strength and agility. Following the success of American Gladiators, other countries began to produce their own versions of the show. It finished its run in 1996 after seven seasons, but the show has been revived with the 2008 and 2026 versions aired.

== Background and history ==
The concept was originally created in 1982 by Johnny C. Ferraro and Dann Carr. Carr gathered the Gladiators and hosted the show, and Ferraro financed and produced the original competition at Erie Tech High School in Erie, Pennsylvania so Ferraro could have the event on film so as to shop the new creation. In 1983 Ferraro financed, developed and packaged the American Gladiators as a movie project. In 1984 Carr sold his interest in a literary purchase to Flor-Jon Films. Ferraro had been the main driving force behind the American Gladiators brand since 1982. In 1987, Flor-Jon Films then licensed the unscripted rights to The Samuel Goldwyn Company (now a part of MGM). Ferraro is the sole creator of the 1994 kids' version of the series, Gladiators 2000 (a.k.a. G2).

An all-star, one-off primetime celebrity special, Superstar American Gladiators, aired on ABC on May 4, 1995.

Flor-Jon Films, Inc and the Samuel Goldwyn Co in 1993 granted a license to Chariot Entertainment in an effort to launch a live American Gladiators show on the Las Vegas Strip, but the president of Chariot became mired in a securities fraud prosecution, through no fault of Flor-Jon Films or The Samuel Goldwyn Co, and the live show went unrealized.

=== 2008 revival ===
MGM Television, the successor company to the Samuel Goldwyn Company, during the 2007–08 Writers Guild of America strike, sold to NBC a prime-time revival that was closer to the British version than the American, with hosts Hulk Hogan and Laila Ali, and Van Earl Wright the play-by-play voice. That version lasted two seasons.

=== Potential revivals ===
In July 2014, it was reported that American Ninja Warrior producer Arthur Smith had been pitching a reboot of American Gladiators with MGM Television, which would have had a "darker" and more "serious" post-apocalyptic theme inspired by works such as The Hunger Games. He explained, "it's a little less red, white and blue. And there's no spandex. Spandex has left the building."

In August 2018, it was reported that MGM was pitching another revival with actors Seth Rogen and Evan Goldberg as executive producers; it did not make it to air. In September 2021, Deadline Hollywood reported that MGM Television had partnered with professional wrestling promotion WWE on co-producing a potential revival, which would have featured WWE talent.

In April 2024, it was reported that Johnny Ferraro had signed Range Sports as a representative to develop new "TV, film, attractions, merchandise and live events" within the American Gladiators franchise, in a decision that was accelerated by the success of a BBC reboot of the British version that premiered earlier in the year. In June 2024, it was reported that the reboot had been ordered by Amazon Prime Video, produced by MGM Television (MGM had been acquired by Amazon in 2021) in association with Ferraro's Flor-Jon Films. On May 12, 2025, MGM announced that WWE performer The Miz would serve as host. On June 12, 2025, it was announced that Rocsi Diaz, Chris Rose and Maurice Jones-Drew will become his sidekicks.

== Competition ==
American Gladiators featured four competitors, two men and two women, in most episodes. The players, referred to throughout the series as "contenders", faced off in a series of physical games against each other and against a cast of costumed athletes looking to prevent them from succeeding (the titular "Gladiators"). Each match saw the competitors trying to advance in a tournament, with one man and one woman crowned champion at its conclusion.

=== Initial tournament format ===
When the series premiered in the fall of 1989, ten men and ten women were selected to participate with several more chosen to be alternates in case one or more of the contenders had to withdraw due to injury.

The tournament was spread out over the course of twelve episodes. The first five episodes served as the preliminary round, and the winners of those five matches automatically advanced to the quarterfinals of the tournament. To round the field out at eight, the three highest scoring runners-up would be given wild card berths in the quarterfinals. From this point forward, the tournament became single-elimination, and any alternates (if needed) would be taken from the pool of defeated contenders.

Any contender that advanced beyond the quarterfinals was guaranteed to receive a prize. Reaching the semifinals of the tournament guaranteed that a contender would receive at least $2,500 in cash. A finalist was guaranteed to leave with at least $5,000, and the winner of the tournament would take home $10,000 for his/her efforts.

Originally, as mentioned multiple times over the course of the first series of episodes, the male and female contenders who won the tournament would become Gladiators themselves for any subsequent competitions. However, as noted by male tournament winner Brian Hutson in a 2020 interview with the Columbus Dispatch, the producers decided against this because both he and Tracy Phillips, the female winner, were both significantly undersized when compared to the troupe of Gladiators they had just finished facing. In addition, the response the initial series of episodes was positive, and the producers decided to conduct a second tournament to begin airing immediately after the conclusion of the first.

Beginning in early 1990, an additional twenty men and women began competing in the second tournament. As before, the five winning contestants automatically advanced along with the three highest scoring runners-up. The male and female winners of this tournament would face Hutson and Phillips in one final match, dubbed the Grand Championship, with the winners becoming the overall season champion. Those contenders would receive additional prizes (see below).

From then on until 1994, two tournaments per season were conducted with each comprising half of the season and the Grand Championship concluding the season. The second season used the same format as the first, while the format was changed for season three and again for season five.

=== Changes ===
==== Season 3–4 ====
For these two seasons, a total of twenty-four men and twenty-four women were selected to compete. Six preliminary matchups were played, with the winners advancing to the quarterfinals; unlike before, the preliminary round was single-elimination.

The six remaining contenders on each side competed in three quarterfinal matches, with the winners automatically advancing. To even out the semifinal field at four, the highest scoring contender among the losing quarterfinalists advanced as the lone wild card in the competition. The two semifinal winners would then face each other for a berth in the Grand Championship.

==== Season 5 ====
32 contenders competed over the course of the season.

For the first time, there were no wildcard spots used in the tournament. Instead, the preliminary round was used for the purposes of seeding, as all eight of the competitors on each side were guaranteed a spot in the quarterfinals, known in this season as the elimination round. After the preliminaries, the contenders were seeded 1-8 based on their performance. The tournament then proceeded as normal.

==== Season 6–7 ====
The tournament for season six was held over the course of the entire season. A total of 64 competitors were selected, and the format used was similar to the one employed on the British version of the program. In addition to winning, each contender hoped to have one of the four highest score totals of the season; the contenders that did so would face each other in the semi-finals, with the winners facing off for the Grand Championship.

Season seven's tournament was conducted as one single-elimination tournament with a total of sixteen contenders. The Grand Champions for this season would be granted automatic berths in the second installment of International Gladiators to be held at the National Indoor Arena in Birmingham, England, which was where the British series was staged and which had also played host to the first edition of the tournament. The second international competition would comprise most of the second half of season seven, and ultimately would conclude the series for American audiences.

==== The set ====
During the first half of the first season, the show's set resembled that of an ancient Roman gladiatorial arena, with the stands raised high above the ground. For the second half, the show's set was changed into a modern indoor sports arena style. An onscreen clock was added in the second half of the season, which allowed viewers to see how much time a contender had left to complete an event.

The hooded figures that officiated the games were replaced by veteran NFL referee Bob McElwee (No. 95). Starting in Season 2, former Pacific-10 football referee Larry Thompson became the referee. In case of ruling explanations, a host would interview the referee for an explanation.

=== Production base ===
The first two seasons were recorded on Stage 27 at Universal Studios Hollywood. Beginning with the third season and continuing for the rest of the run, the show relocated production to the CBS Studio Center in Studio City, Los Angeles. The studio used to tape the show was referred to on air as “Gladiator Arena”.

=== Events ===
In each episode, the contenders competed in a series of events. Six to eight events were played per show, varying from season to season. Most of the events tested the contenders' physical abilities against the superior size and strength of the Gladiators, who were mostly pro or amateur bodybuilders and former football players. In most events, the contenders were not directly pitted against each other, but against the Gladiators. In each event, the contenders earned points based on their performance. In the first half of season one, the points in each event were given in minimum 5-point increments, with 100 points usually the maximum in every event. After the first half of the first season, single point increments were used, with most events offering a 10 point maximum.

Some events had objectives where each contender had to perform a certain task against the Gladiator, while the Gladiator was trying to do the same thing to them (such as attempting to knock each other off the platforms in Joust). In these types of events, where a clear winner could emerge, contenders were usually awarded ten points for defeating the Gladiator and five points if the event was a draw. No points were awarded to the contender if the Gladiator won.

Other events had no maximum score, with the objective being to perform a task as many times as possible (such as scoring goals in Powerball) within the set time limit for the event. Points in this case would be awarded based on how many times the contender accomplished the objective during the event.

Starting with the fourth season, the final event before The Eliminator, was labeled "Crunch Time", and was played for more points.

Season six used a format in which events were referred to as "rounds" due to more than one game played per round. Three games per show were played by both males and females and three were split between the males and females, two each in a round. In split rounds the men went first. Including the Eliminator, ten events appeared in each episode, and the lineup of single and split rounds changed during the season. The sole exception to this format was in the semi-finals and grand championship, in which each round was a single event.

There were four lineups used during the season:

Lineup	Event 1	Event 2	Event 3	Event 4	Event 5	Event 6
1	Pyramid	Hang Tough/Assault	Joust/Whiplash	Tug O War/Gauntlet	Snapback	Powerball
2	Swingshot	Assault/Breakthrough & Conquer	Whiplash/Tug O War	Snapback	Pyramid	Gauntlet/Joust
3	Powerball	Hang Tough/Whiplash	Skytrack	Swingshot	Breakthrough & Conquer/Assault	Joust/Gauntlet
4	Swingshot	Tug O War/Whiplash	The Wall	Hang Tough/Assault	Powerball	Gauntlet/Breakthrough & Conquer

The Eliminator was the final event played in each episode, and determined which contender would win that day's competition. The contenders competed side-by-side to complete a large obstacle course as quickly as they could. In the first two seasons, the Eliminator had a time limit, and both contenders started the course at the same time. Contenders scored points for every second left on the clock when they finished the course; the contender with the highest final score won the day's competition. Beginning in season 3, the contender in the lead was given a head start with each point they led by worth a half-second; the first contender to cross the finish line won.

Of the events that debuted in the show's first season, only six lasted the entire original run on American television: Breakthrough and Conquer, The Wall, Joust, Assault, Powerball, and the Eliminator, although The Wall did not debut until the second half of the first season.

=== List of gladiators ===
Gladiator	Name	Debut season	Years active	Notes
Malibu	Deron McBee	1	1989	Reprised his role as Malibu on Tosh.0.
Lace	Marisa Pare	1	1989–1992	Absent for most of 1991–92 season due to an injury.
Zap	Raye Hollitt	1	1989–1990, 1991–1995	Absent for entire 1990–91 season while on maternity leave.
Gemini	Myke Horton (Michael M. Horton)	1	1989–1992	Before his Gladiator career, Gemini was a one-time contestant on the Bob Eubanks-hosted revival of Card Sharks, and on Press Your Luck.
Nitro	Dan Clark	1	1989–1992, 1994–1995	Color commentator during show's final season (1995–1996) and coordinating producer of the 2008 revival
Sunny	Cheryl Baldinger	1	1989	Injured during semifinal round of first half-season, and did not return.
Blaze	Sha-Ri Pendleton	1	1990–1992	
Bronco	Ritch Finnegan	1	1989	Appeared as a replacement on one episode following an injury to Malibu.
Gold	Tonya Knight	1	1990–1992	Absent for part of 1991–92 season due to an injury. Died on February 7, 2023.
Laser	Jim Starr	1	1990–1996	Only gladiator to appear in all seven seasons of the series.
Jade	unknown	1	1989	Appeared as a replacement in the finals of the first half-season, following an injury to Sunny. Not to be confused with the Jade who appeared in American Gladiators Orlando Live!
Titan	David Nelson	1	1990	Fired after charging referee Bob McElwee during second half season.
Diamond	Erika Andersch	2	1990–1993	Appeared in 1991–92 season as an injury replacement for Lace.
Ice	Lori Fetrick	2	1990–1992, 1993–1996	Fetrick is now a YouTuber and host of her own podcast called "Chillin' with Ice".
Thunder	Billy Smith	2	1990–1992	Died in August 2021.
Turbo	Galen Tomlinson	2	1990–1996	Absent for most of 1991–92 season due to an injury.
Storm	Debbie Clark	3	1991–1993	Appeared as a replacement following an injury to Gold, continued to appear as a regular gladiator until 1993. Died August 24, 2026.
Tower	Steve Henneberry	3	1991–1994	Appeared as a replacement following an injury to Turbo, continued to appear as a regular gladiator until 1994
Viper	Scott Berlinger	3	1992–1993	Debuted during 1992 Grand Championship, became regular gladiator the following year
Atlas	Philip Poteat	4	1992–1993	Appeared during the World Challenge of Champions. Died on August 30, 2017.
Cyclone	Barry Turner	4	1992–1993	Injured during preliminary rounds of Season 4 and did not return
Elektra	Salina Bartunek	4	1992–1994	Appeared sparingly following an injury during the 1992–1993 grand championship
Lace	Natalie Lennox	4	1992–1993	Appeared on only two episodes and during the World Challenge of Champions.
Havoc	George King	4	1992–1993	Appeared sparingly
Sabre	Lynn Williams	4	1992–1996	
Siren	Shelley Beattie	4	1992–1996	Only deaf gladiator, died in 2008
Sky	Shirley Eson-Korito	4	1992–1996	
Dallas	Shannon Hall	5	1993–1995	
Hawk	Lee Reherman	5	1993–1996	Died on February 29, 2016
Jazz	Victoria Gay	5	1993–1996	
Rebel	Mark Tucker	5	1993–1994	
Tank	Ed Radcliffe	5	1993–1994	Appeared as a replacement following an injury to Laser, appearing on three episodes

== Production ==
=== Segments ===
Throughout the series, American Gladiators had several regular segments that were not related to the competition of the day. These segments were used to allow the audience to get to know the Gladiators or to highlight some of the best moments of past competitions.

- Gladiator Moments (Season 3): Gladiators reflect and talk about their favorite moments of the first two seasons of American Gladiators.
- Ask a Gladiator (Seasons 3 and 4): Fans write to their favorite American Gladiator asking them questions.
- Csonka's Zonks (Season 4): Brief array of clips featuring the funniest moments of the show which includes mostly hits, tackles, and tumbles of the contenders and Gladiators.
- 30 Seconds With: (Seasons 5 and 6): In season 5 Gladiators are asked a number of fill-in-the-blank questions. Then in season 6 the questions were taken away and it was just the Gladiators talking about a random topic.

=== Production notes ===
The show was taped at Universal Studios Hollywood until 1991, then moved to Gladiator Arena (Studio 3) at CBS Studio Center in Studio City for the rest of its initial run. The National Indoor Arena, home to the UK version, hosted the International Gladiators competitions.

The series, a co-production of Trans World International and Four Point Entertainment, was distributed by Samuel Goldwyn Television.

The original Pilot was hosted by Fran Tarkenton and Tim Wrightman.

The first 13 episodes were recorded from July 24 to August 5, 1989. The remaining 13 episodes of the first season began production on January 9, 1990. The entire 26 episode second season was recorded in five weeks from June to July 1990.

=== Prizes ===
As mentioned above, the original intent of the producers was to award the winning contenders $10,000 for winning their competition and add them to the roster of Gladiators for each subsequent competition, but that idea was scrapped in favor of having two separate competitions per season and an overall season championship after both competitions crowned winners.

As previously mentioned, in each half-season tournament, the contenders eliminated in the semifinals would take home $2,500. The runners-up in the first and second half finals would win $5,000. The winners of those competitions would win $10,000, and the winner of the Grand Championship won an additional $15,000 while the runner-up received $10,000. In the first four seasons, an automobile was awarded to the overall season champions. In seasons one and two, the champions were offered their choice of several General Motors vehicles. Season three's champions would win a Chevrolet S-10 Blazer, and season four's champions received a Suzuki Sidekick. The runners up received an all-expenses paid vacation at a Club Med resort of their choice.

With the adjustment to the tournament format in season six, each winning contender would receive $2,500 in cash regardless of whether or not they advanced to the semifinals. The two contenders to advance to the Grand Championship would win an additional $7,500, with the champion receiving another $15,000 in cash and $5,000 in prizes including a Versaclimber machine in season six and an additional $10,000 in cash in season seven. The runners up in both of those seasons would receive $5,000.

=== Hosts and other personalities ===
Joe Theismann and Mike Adamle co-hosted American Gladiators during the first half of the first season, with Theismann presiding over the proceedings and Adamle serving more of an analyst's role. After Theismann left the series, Adamle became the lead commentator and remained in that role for the remainder of the series. Todd Christensen initially was Adamle's replacement as analyst, with Larry Csonka joining the series at the beginning of season two in 1990. Csonka was replaced by Lisa Malosky following the fourth season, and she held the analyst position for seasons five and six. Danny Lee Clark, who spent the first three seasons and most of season six on the show as Gladiator Nitro, became co-host for the final season and was credited on air as Dan "Nitro" Clark.

Adamle also hosted both seasons of International Gladiators and was joined by John Fashanu in season one and Ulrika Jonsson and Kimberley Joseph in season two.

A referee wearing an executioner costume appeared during the first half of the first season (portrayed by former football player Jeff Benson). Then-NFL referee Bob McElwee became the referee for the second half of season one. Larry Thompson (a former Pacific-10 Football referee) took over for season two in 1990 and remained until the series ended in 1996. The referees were assisted by several game judges, including Bob Wucetich, Fred Gallagher and Jim Marcione. During International Gladiators, Thompson was also joined by the British Gladiators referee, John Anderson.

Theismann also was the announcer of the first season and was replaced by legendary game show announcer John Harlan in 1990, who remained with the show until his retirement from announcing in 1993. There was no announcer after that, although Adamle introduced the Gladiators in the final season.

=== Champions ===
Season champions
Season		Female	Male
Season 1	Winner	Bridget Venturi	Brian Hutson
Season 1	Runner-up	Tracy Phillips	Lucian Anderson
Season 2	Winner	Dorann Cumberbatch	Craig Branham
Season 2	Runner-up	Maria Nichting	Rico Constantino
Season 3	Winner	Kathy Mollica	Mark Ortega
Season 3	Runner-up	Kimberly Lentz	Joseph Mauro
Season 4	Winner	Cheryl Wilson	Cliff Miller
Season 4	Runner-up	Betsy Erickson	Marty DePaoli
Season 5	Winner	Peggy Odita	Wesley Berry
Season 5	Runner-up	Kimberly Tyler	Troy Jackson
Season 6	Winner	Adrienne Sullivan	Kyler Storm
Season 6	Runner-up	Liz Ragland	Daniel Cunningham
Season 7	Winner	Tiziana Sorge	Pat Csizmazia
Season 7	Runner-up	Carla Zeitlin	Rich McCormick

== Reception ==
The show was a popular success, but critically panned.

== International broadcasts ==
American Gladiators was broadcast in the UK by ITV as part of their Night Time slot starting on September 1, 1990. In 1992, ITV debuted their own version called Gladiators and in doing so became the first country to adapt American Gladiators.

In Japan, the series aired under the title Clash! American Muscle Battle (激突!アメリカン筋肉バトル, Gekitotsu! Amerikan kin'niku batoru), and was shown as a sports variety program produced by TV Tokyo aired on its affiliated stations from October 16, 1992, to March 1993. It comprises the series' footage from its heyday, dubbed into Japanese, with exchanges between the hosts of the late Tatsuya Kurama and Reiko Katō respectively. At the end of each episode, Kato would encourage Kurama to join the Gladiators.

== Other ventures ==
In 2008, MGM, Reveille and Flor-Jon Films Inc. revealed a special American Gladiators U.S. cross-country tour. MGM along with Johnny Ferraro have also put into development a cartoon series based on the show but has never aired.

In 2009, Johnny Ferraro wanted to bring a live-action movie of American Gladiators. Former Legendary Pictures chief marketing officer Scott Mednick was producing the film where the goal was to create an action story that takes place inside the world Ferraro created.

=== Reruns ===
USA Network was the first network to air reruns of American Gladiators, acquiring a total of 104 episodes. In 1992, USA began airing episodes daily in the late afternoon following its game show rerun lineup and preceding Cartoon Express, and later moved the episodes to air as part of its mid-morning lineup. The network initially had rights to the first three seasons and picked up rights to the fourth when it finished airing in 1993, but did not pick up any additional seasons beyond that. USA aired reruns through at least 1996, just as the show ended its original run.

Spike TV purchased a rerun package they began airing during their last days as The National Network in 2002. Originally airing weekday afternoons and late night Saturdays, Spike eventually scaled back the reruns to the late Saturday airing and then dropped them in 2003. Spike was only given rights to seasons two through four in their entirety, special episodes from seasons five and six, season seven in its entirety, and both editions of International Gladiators in their entirety.

In 2007, ESPN added the entire original series to ESPN Classic's lineup. This meant that the non-specials from seasons five and six saw their first airings since their respective seasons and the first season, including the episodes under the original format, would be seen for the first time since USA carried the series. ESPN Classic briefly pulled the original American Gladiators series from its lineup shortly after a revival premiered in 2008, but returned it after the revival concluded. ESPN permanently removed the show from ESPN Classic in 2009.

In 2017, after an absence from television lasting several years, American Gladiators reruns returned to the air with the launch of the Sinclair Broadcast Group's action-themed broadcast network Charge!. Edited reruns of the UK Gladiators series were also added. As of 2020, both shows are no longer on the Charge! schedule.

As of April 2018, SI TV (Sports Illustrated TV) has added the original series to their premium channel add on for Amazon Prime.

In October 2019, a channel dedicated to the original show, as well as the 2008 revival was added to Pluto TV on channel 136, later channel 303. Episodes spanned the entire run of both shows, with only the International Gladiators episodes absent. On October 1, 2021, the channel was removed from the lineup. Several episodes are available for download on Apple's iTunes Service. In May 2025 the channel was revived on Amazon Prime Video.

=== Broadband website ===
Since January 28, 2008, broadband website americangladiators.com has paid homage to the original series by featuring clips of it; everything has been re-digitized, reintroducing original Gladiators and give fans an update on where they are today, and also including "Best Hits" and stunts performed on the show.

=== 30 for 30 ===
On April 12, 2021, it was announced that an upcoming documentary film about American Gladiators for the ESPN series 30 for 30 was going to be produced by Vice Studios and ESPN Films and would directed by Ben Berman and co-directed by Kirk Johnson. After two years in development, on April 21, 2023, it was announced that the two-part documentary film will be called The American Gladiators Documentary premiering May 30 and 31 on ESPN, and will be available on its streaming service ESPN+ immediately after its premiere.

=== Muscles & Mayhem ===
In 2023, Netflix released a five-part documentary series on American Gladiators called Muscles & Mayhem: An Unauthorized Story of American Gladiators.The series was released on June 28, 2023.

=== Siren: The Voices of Shelley Beattie ===
On September 22, 2026, a documentary about the late Gladiator Shelley Beattie called Siren: The Voices of Shelley Beattiedebuted on HBO Max where Academy Award Winner Marlee Matlin explores the legacy of the late deaf body builder and American Gladiator.

=== Home media ===
On July 14, 2009 Shout! Factory released The Battle Begins, featuring commentary from the Lazer, Zap, and Nitro, and an interview with Billy Wirth. This DVD only has the last 14 episodes of season one (the mid-season recap, and the second half of season one).

=== Soundtrack ===
American Gladiators: The Music

Soundtrack album by Dan Milner, Bill Conti
- Released: March 3, 1993
- Length: 38:19
- Label: Sandstone Music

In 1993, American Gladiators: The Music was released by DCC Compact Classics/Sandstone Music, featuring songs used on the show, Dan Milner's music for the games and the opening and closing themes by Bill Conti.

American Gladiators: The Music
No.	Title	Length
1.	"American Gladiators Introduction" (Featuring Mike Adamle)	0:28
2.	"American Gladiators Opening"	0:27
3.	"We Will Rock You–Queen"	1:45
4.	"Joust"	2:14
5.	"Rock and Roll (Part II)–Gary Glitter"	2:46
6.	"Gauntlet"	1:53
7.	"Jump–The Movement"	1:51
8.	"Eliminator"	2:01
9.	"Tuff Enuff–The Fabulous Thunderbirds"	3:07
10.	"Tug-O-War"	1:59
11.	"Hit Me with Your Best Shot–Pat Benatar"	2:47
12.	"Whiplash"	1:04
13.	"Breakthrough and Conquer"	1:14
14.	"Oh Yeah–Yello"	3:04
15.	"Assault"	2:02
16.	"The Warrior–Scandal"	3:45
17.	"Hang Tough"	1:58
18.	"Atlasphere"	0:27
19.	"Swingshot"	2:12
20.	"Powerball" (Featuring Mike Adamle)	0:32
21.	"American Gladiators Theme"	0:43

=== American Gladiators Orlando Live! ===
In 1995, American Gladiators performed a dinner show in Orlando, Florida. This dinner show featured Dallas, Laser, Hawk, Ice, Jazz, Nitro, Sabre, Siren, Sky, Tower, and Turbo from the TV show along with the new Gladiators Apache, Cobra, Electra, Flame, Flash, Jade, Quake, Rage, Raven, Tank, Thor, Tigra, Titan, Viper. The events included The Wall, Breakthrough and Conquer, Assault, Whiplash, the Eliminator and others.

== Other versions ==
=== Gladiators 2000 ===
A kids version of the show called Gladiators 2000 (also known as G2) hosted by Ryan Seacrest and Maria Sansone (later Valerie Rae Miller in season 2) where it had traditional games mixed with trivia questions thrown in for educational value aired in syndication from September 9, 1994, until May 5, 1996. American Gladiators season 5 and International Gladiators 2 grand champion Peggy Odita served as the show's referee.

=== Superstar American Gladiators ===
An hour-long, one-off celebrity primetime special called Superstar American Gladiators hosted by Pat O'Brien and Kim Alexis Duguay aired on ABC on May 4, 1995, where four teams of stars from the four major television networks of ABC, CBS, NBC and FOX each led by an American Gladiator from the original syndicated version as their team captain competed against the gladiators from the syndicated series in various contest for $15,000 and the Superstar Gladiator Trophy. The celebrities in this special were: Sarah Chalke, Debbe Dunning, Darius McCrary & Holly Robinson (representing ABC Team; Hawk was their team captain); Charlie Robinson, Victoria Rowell, Shadoe Stevens & Helene Udy (representing CBS Team; Sky was their team captain); Drake Hogestyn, Mario Lopez, Marsha Warfield & Tina Yothers (representing Team NBC; Sabre was their team captain) & Tichina Arnold, Jensen Daggett, David Goldsmith & John Henton (representing FOX Team; Ice was their team captain).

=== 2008 revival ===
A revival of American Gladiators hosted by Hulk Hogan and Laila Ali aired on NBC from January 6 until August 4, 2008.

== See also ==
- Gladiators (franchise)
- American Gladiators (2008 TV series), the 2008 revival
- American Gladiators, 1992 video game
- Superstar American Gladiators, a primetime special that aired on ABC in 1995.
- Gladiators 2000, a spinoff of AG for children
- Nickelodeon Guts, a children's athletic competition program
- My Family's Got Guts, the 2008 revival of GUTS
- Jeux sans frontières, a Europe-wide television game show, based on the French programme Intervilles
- Muscles & Mayhem: An Unauthorized Story of American Gladiators
