= Jim Kalafat =

American Gladiator, Former Footballer

Jim Kalafat-Starr
- Born: February 21, 1962 (age 64); Great Falls, Montana, US
- Other name: Laser
- Education: Montana State University (B.S)
- Occupations: Ex-professional athlete and product development (nutraceuticals)
- Height: 6 ft 0 in (1.83 m)
- Spouse: Tonya Smith
- Children: 3
- Parent(s): Kathy & Ron Kalafat
- Website: http://www.jimkalafat.com/

Jim Kalafat (also known as Jim Starr) is an American athlete, actor, and producer. Under the stage name Laser, he competed as a gladiator on the American TV show American Gladiators from 1989 to 1996.

== Early life and education ==
Kalafat was born in Great Falls, Montana, on February 21, 1962. He graduated from CM Russell High School. In 1986, he graduated from Montana State University,

== Career ==
=== Football ===
Kalafat was an all-state running back in 1979. In 1980, he was recruited to play in the offensive backfield at the Bobcats' of Montana State; however, in 1982, he was moved to linebacker. He held the Bobcats' top two single-season tackles marks. Kalafat also has MSU's single-game record of 30 tackles (against Nevada in 1983), as well as games of 29, 28, and 26 tackles, and ranks fifth in program history in career tackles (380). In 1984, Jim started his career in professional football in the National Football League (NFL), and later spent time in the Canadian Football League (CFL). He was a member of the Kansas City Chiefs in 1984 but was released on August 13, 1984. He played one game for the Toronto Argonauts in 1985, and had a one-game stint as a replacement player for the Los Angeles Rams in 1987.

Kalafat had a career-ending injury in 1987.

=== American Gladiator ===
In 1989, he was selected as 'Laser' in the American television series, American Gladiators. He debuted in the second half of the first season and remained until 1996, when the show ended.

He was featured in a five-part documentary series on Netflix, titled Muscles & Mayhem: An Unauthorized Story of American Gladiators.

== Awards and achievements ==
- Kalafat held the single-game and single-season tackle records at Montana State University, in 1983.
- In 1986, earned the bodybuilding title of Mr. Montana.
- In 2023, he was nominated and selected to the CMR Legends Hall of Fame.
