= Kim Betts =

British gymnast and television presenter

- Born: 25 December 1971 (age 53)
- Known for: Gladiators (1992 series)
- Height: 1.7 m (5 ft 7 in)

Kim Betts (née Williams; born 25 December 1971) is a British gymnast, bodybuilder, and TV presenter best known as Lightning in the ITV show Gladiators, where she was the longest-serving female star.

== Gymnastics ==
At age six Betts took up gymnastics after she was accepted into Lichfield Olympic Gymnastic Club. Betts had her first competitive event when she was eight years old. In her time as a gymnast she competed all over Great Britain as well as in Bulgaria, Belgium, and Germany. Between the ages of 10 and 16 she trained with the British Squad and gained 32 medals.

== Weight training ==
After gymnastics Betts took up weight training, competed four times in the Miss Figure Bodybuilding competition, and came second in the British Championship Finals. She also won the Willenhall BB Show, Muscle Beach Open and the EFBB British Qualifier. She was a fitness instructor for eighteen months.

== Gladiators ==
As Lightning, she was known as one of the toughest and most determined of the UK Gladiators. Known as the Queen of Hang Tough, she remained undefeated in the UK Arena and was only ever beaten once, during the first Ashes series in Australia. That loss happened on the first heat of the first Ashes against Australia's Kerry Warman, who slid past Lightning and defeated her.

Betts gave birth to a baby boy called Lexus three weeks before competing in the Gladiators arena for the 1999 series.

Lightning appeared in every domestic & international series bar Springbok 2. Her usual attire was a leotard and sometimes sports bra and pants. She made a return to Gladiators for the 2008 revamp in a "Legends" special, competing alongside former Gladiators Flame, Rebel, Rocket, Ace, Hunter, Trojan, and Wolf as special contenders against the new Gladiators for charity. Lightning later returned again for a second Legends special, alongside Scorpio, Siren, Rocket, Bullitt, Cobra, Trojan, and Wolf.

She was the only female gladiator to have starred in all series for the show.
