= Suzanne Cox =

British gymnast

Suzanne Cox-Roberts (born 19 March 1972) is an English aerobic instructor. She was formerly a gladiator in the UK television show Gladiators, in which she went by the name Vogue.

== Early life ==
Cox was born in Barnet, London, England on March 19, 1972. She joined a local gymnastics club at a young age and reached regional level. She also competed in athletics in county meetings in 100 metres, shot put and long jump. At college she gained a PEA and RSA certificate in Exercise and Health Studies which qualifies her to teach aerobics and circuit training.

Cox progressed into competitive aerobics, becoming the UK Champion in 1991, '92, '93 and '94. She also competed at International and European level, becoming European Champion in 1993 and was ranked 7th in the world at the World International Championships in Las Vegas.

== Gladiators ==
In 1995, Cox joined the UK version of Gladiators under the stage name Vogue. Cox was a firm favourite with fans, dazzling them with a display of backflips upon entering the arena. She excelled in Hang Tough, Tightrope and Powerball, although she could turn her hand to any event. Her theme music was "Vogue" by Madonna.

== Post Gladiators ==
Cox has modelled, presented a television show called The Fix, and inspired a computer game featuring an all-action heroine called Silver. She also had a fashion shop 'COR' which she co-ran along with Saracen and former Gladiator Panther. She has recorded a number of fitness videos.

Cox was also part of the UK international Gladiators team and competed against South Africa in the Springbok Challenge 2000. Her husband is 1997 Gladiators 2nd Quarter Finalist Mark Roberts; they have a daughter called Amber and a son called Flynn.

== DVDs ==
- "Suzanne Cox - Boxaerobics"
- "Suzanne Cox's Aerobic Dance - Total Body Toning"
- "Suzanne Cox - The Fix"
- "Suzanne Cox 3 - Firm It Up"
- "Bodylicious - The Ultimate Dance Workout"
