= David Staff =

English footballer (born 1979)

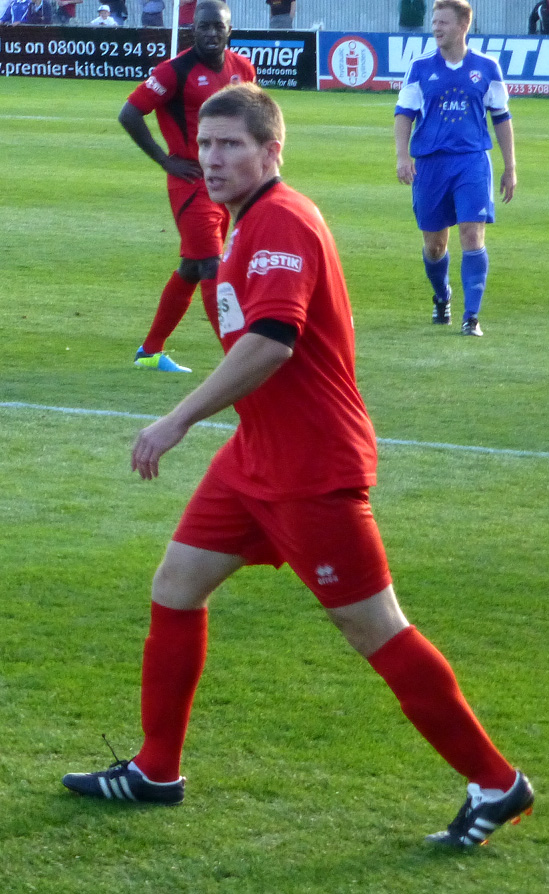
- Staff playing for Stamford AFC in September 2013.

Personal information
- Date of birth: 8 November 1979 (age 46)
- Place of birth: Market Harborough, England
- Position: Midfielder

Senior career*
Years	Team	Apps	(Gls)
- Rushden & Diamonds
1998–2002	Stamford		
2002–2004	King's Lynn	86	(38)
2004–2005	Boston United	5	(0)
2004	→ King's Lynn (loan)	9	(2)
2005	King's Lynn	6	(12)
2005–2007	Nuneaton Borough		
2007	→ Cambridge City (loan)	5	(0)
2007	→ Rugby Town (loan)	9	(1)
2007–2008	Rugby Town	37	(6)
2008–2009	Brackley Town		
2009–2011	Rugby Town	20	(1)
2011–2013	Stamford AFC		
- * Club domestic league appearances and goals

David Staff (born 8 November 1979) is an English footballer who played in the Football League for Boston United. He is a coach at Brackley Town.

Before joining Boston United in August 2004, Staff played non-League football for clubs including Rushden & Diamonds, Stamford and King's Lynn, who he joined on transfer deadline day in 2002, making his Linnets debut on 1 April 2002 against Cambridge City. Despite King's Lynn's relegation to the Southern League Eastern Division at the end of that season, Staff remained with The Linnets. He initially played for King's Lynn in a mixture of full back and midfield roles, but latterly became utilized in a more attacking role. He scored 20 goals in all competitions in the 2002/03 season, and was King's Lynn's leading scorer in the 2003/04 season with 23 goals in all competitions, helping King's Lynn to the Southern League Eastern Division title and promotion back to the Premier Division. "Staffy" was seen as something of a dead-ball specialist and a number of his goals came from goal kicks. In February 2004 he scored directly from a corner kick in King's Lynn's 4–1 victory over Banbury United. He left King's Lynn for Boston United in the summer of 2004, making his Football League debut on 21 August 2004 as a very late substitute in the League Two game against Macclesfield Town which finished 1–1, but failed to establish himself in Boston's first team and returned to King's Lynn. Described as a " versatile attacking midfielder", Staff went on to play for Nuneaton Borough, Cambridge City on loan, Rugby Town, initially on loan, Brackley Town, before returning to Rugby Town in January 2009.

Staff appeared on Sky One's game-show Gladiators, which he won, before also winning on the 'Champion of Champions' show. He works as a sports coach for Kettering Borough Council and Moulton College in Northamptonshire.
