= Gladiators (2008 British TV series) =

- Genre: Game show
- Created by: Dan Carr; John Ferraro
- Presented by: Ian Wright; Kirsty Gallacher; Caroline Flack
- Starring: John Anderson; John Coyle
- Narrated by: Alan Parry
- Theme music composer: Paul Farrer
- Country of origin: United Kingdom
- Original language: English
- No. of series: 2
- No. of episodes: 27 (inc. 8 specials)

Production
- Production location: Shepperton Studios
- Running time: 60 minutes (inc. adverts)
- Production company: Shine TV

Original release
- Network: Sky One
- Release: 11 May 2008 – 25 October 2009

Related
- Gladiators (1992–2000); Gladiators (2024)

Gladiators is a British television series which aired on Sky One from 11 May 2008 to 25 October 2009. It was a revival of the earlier series of the same name and based on the second American version of the show. The US, UK and Australian versions of the show were all revived in 2008.

For the first series, the show was hosted by Ian Wright and Kirsty Gallacher with original referee John Anderson returning. The second series saw Caroline Flack replace Gallacher as host and Anderson replaced by boxing referee John Coyle.

During its original airing on Sky One, it was sponsored by Wii.

The show was cancelled in May 2009 by then director of programmes Stuart Murphy. On 13 January 2024, a second revival started broadcasting on BBC One and BBC iPlayer, presented by Bradley Walsh alongside his son Barney.

== Format ==
Series one featured 32 contenders (16 male, 16 female). Men and women competed in separate tournaments, with two men and two women competing in each episode. Contenders participated in events against the Gladiators, trying to earn points before the final event, the Eliminator, each point separating the contenders translated into a half-second advantage. The four events leading up to the final were selected from a total of eleven events. The grand prize in Series 1 was £50,000 per winning contender.

=== Changes from the original series ===
The show featured a lineup of new Gladiators, however Amazon, Panther, Siren and Warrior share names with Gladiators from the original UK series and several others share names with those from international series. Owing to Sky One's greater advertising requirements, and contestant interviews prior to each of the events starting, the number of events before the Eliminator was cut from five to four. The revival also had a more dramatic presentation and featured new theme music.

Whereas in the original series the Gladiators all wore matching leotards, here all costumes were different. Some costumes were themed to the aliases, with Spartan, Battleaxe and Warrior's costumes all styled to look like period battle armour. Many of the Gladiator costumes were noticeably more revealing than in the original series, with Oblivion, Destroyer and Ice in particular were wearing very little.

=== Events ===
The new Gladiators studio set meant that there was only room for eleven events, nine from the original series: Duel, Gauntlet, Hang Tough, Hit & Run, Powerball, Pursuit, Pyramid, The Wall and Suspension Bridge. The two new events were Earthquake and Rocketball, which originated in the first and second American Gladiators series respectively.

Notable changes from the original series include Duel, Hang Tough, Hit & Run, Pursuit and Suspension Bridge now being played over water. The revised Eliminator featured a swimming section, a climb to the top of the Pyramid and two Travelators in series two.

== The Gladiators ==
=== Female Gladiators ===
| Alias | Series | | Name | Stats | Background | Description |
| Alias | First | Last | Name | Stats | Background | Description |
|---|---|---|---|---|---|---|
| Amazon | 2 | 2 | Zoe Williams | 5 ft 10 in 10 st 6 lb | Rugby Union player | Regal and Amazonian, nature's powerful force runs through her veins. |
| Battleaxe | 1 | 2 | Shirley Webb | 5 ft 9 in 13 st | Olympic Hammer thrower | A weapon of war; domineering, aggressive and indomitable, Battleaxe is a warrior Queen. |
| Cyclone | 1 (temp), 2 | 2 | Donna Williams | 5 ft 4 in 9 st 5 lb | Acrobat and stunt performer | Fast and furious, Cyclone leaves destruction all around her. |
| Enigma | 1 | 2 | Jenny Pacey | 5 ft 11 in 10 st 4 lb | Long jumper and bobsledder | Mysterious and beautiful, contradictory and unpredictable, Enigma is impossible to capture. |
| Ice | 1 | 1 | Caroline Pearce | 5 ft 6 in 9 st 4 lb | Heptathlete and bobsledder | Ice is Cold, steely, frosty and beautiful. |
| Inferno | 1 | 2 | Jemma Palmer | 5 ft 6 in 9 st 10 lb | Professional wrestler and model | Inferno is hot, fiery, dangerous and destructive. |
| Panther | 1 | 2 | Kara Nwidobie Sharpe | 5 ft 10 in 13 st | Discus thrower | Beautiful, sleek and prowling, fierce and aggressive, Panther is the most powerful of them all. |
| Siren | 2 | 2 | Amy Guy | 5 ft 9 in 9 st | Model and show jumper | The goddess of perilous seduction, expect no mercy. She will entice any contender into the waters and show how dangerous she can be. |
| Tempest | 1 | 2 | Lucy Boggis | 5 ft 9 in 10 st 7 lb | Junior heptathlete | Naturally beautiful, Tempest is a force of nature bringing furious agitation and commotion. |

=== Male Gladiators ===
| Alias | Series | | Name | Stats | Background | Description |
| Alias | First | Last | Name | Stats | Background | Description |
|---|---|---|---|---|---|---|
| Atlas | 1 | 2 | Sam Bond | 5 ft 11 in 16 st 7 lb | Bodybuilder | As strong as He-man, Atlas fights hard but with dignity. |
| Destroyer | 1 | 1 | Damar Martin | 5 ft 11 in 17 st | Bodybuilder | Determined and strong, angry and unstoppable – nothing gets in his way. |
| Doom | 2 | 2 | Wayne Gordon | 6 ft 3 in 15 st | Stunt performer and bobsledder | Mere mortals beware, there’s a dark cloud that looms, judgment day is afoot and Doom is your worst nightmare. |
| Goliath | 2 | 2 | Barri Griffiths | 6 ft 6 in 20 st | Professional wrestler | A man-mountain with brute force. As frightening to look at as he is unstoppable. Contenders will always be in his shadow – because his shadow’s so big! |
| Oblivion | 1 | 2 | Nick Aldis | 6 ft 3 in 16 st 7 lb | Professional wrestler | Oblivion leaves nothing in his path as he extinguishes the opposition. |
| Predator | 1 | 2 | Du'aine Ladejo | 6 ft 2 in 13 st 5 lb | Olympic sprinter and decathlete | Volatile, quick and poisonous, Predator hunts down prey and takes no prisoners. |
| Spartan | 1 | 2 | Roderick Bradley | 6 ft 3 in 15 st | American football wide receiver | Handsome, disciplined and brave, Spartan is the perfect warrior. |
| Tornado | 1 | 2 | David McIntosh | 6 ft 0 in 15 st 4 lb | Royal Marines Commando | Violently destructive and full of unstoppable energy, Tornado will leave you in a spin. |
| Warrior | 2 | 2 | Daniel Singh | 6 ft 3 in 17 st 8 lb | Fitness leader and professional wrestler | A savage beast who takes no prisoner. A Warrior in name and nature with a fearful battle cry. |

=== Leader of the Pack ===
From the original series, Wolf (Real name Michael Van Wijk) appeared in two legends specials in 2008, before becoming the "Leader of the Pack" in series 2. He appeared in this capacity giving motivational talks to the Gladiators and participate in interviews before and after events.

== Series winners ==
=== Series One (2008) ===
- Male winner: Simon Wray
- Female winner: Anna Miller

=== Series Two (2009) ===
- Male winner: David Staff
- Female winner: Kathryn Evans

=== Champion of Champions (2009) ===
- Male winner: David Staff
- Female winner: Anna Miller

== Music ==
All the music to the new series was specially composed by British composer Paul Farrer, who is also known for his music for The Weakest Link and Dancing on Ice. Other samples of popular music were used in events on the show, including "...Baby One More Time" by Britney Spears, "Boom! Shake the Room" by DJ Jazzy Jeff & the Fresh Prince and "Another One Bites the Dust" by Queen.

== Injuries ==
=== Series One ===
According to reports, at least one contestant had to withdraw from the opening episode, while one of the Gladiators slipped on a bridge and had to leave the set. Another Gladiator, Enigma, suffered an injured ankle and had to be replaced in the semi-finals and final by stand-in Gladiator Cyclone. Enigma was involved in a separate incident on Gauntlet, in which contender Leanne Lennox kicked a ram rod into her face, resulting in a confrontation and then her being disqualified.

Contenders also suffered injuries; including Nicola Trench, who broke her toe on Earthquake, and Joel Grant Jones, who sustained a shoulder injury in Powerball. Gavin Sunshine hurt his knee in Gauntlet and Greg Kirk suffered a broken arm in the quarter-finals during Powerball, in both cases the contenders were left unable to compete in the Eliminator. Kirk withdrew before the event and was replaced by back-up contender Andy Bell, while Sunshine was unable to complete the Eliminator and his competitor, Kevin Dixon, won the show by default. Kevin Dixon was the only contender to be replaced before an event with a gladiator due to his injury in Gauntlet. Ian Deeth was his substitute.

Sky One responded to say that health and safety is their number one issue, and they want to minimise the injuries, but pointed out that; "This is Gladiators – a tough physical show for athletes. It's not Family Fortunes!"

=== Series Two ===
In the second episode of "Gladiators: The Legends Strike Back", female legend Scorpio suffered an ankle fracture while participating in The Wall.

In the fourth episode, a female contestant, Gemma Green, had to pull out owing to sustaining a knee injury in Gauntlet just before the Eliminator. In the semi-finals, David Staff broke his nose while on Earthquake with Doom; however, he went on to score points in the event and later won the show, eventually becoming male champion of the series and later the Champion of Champions special, aired on April 5, 2009. Also, Gladiator Warrior sustained a cut above his eye after a clash with contender Justin Thompson during Gauntlet, which saw him having to be replaced in the event by Oblivion.

== Spinoffs ==
=== Gladiators G-Zone ===
Originally advertised as Gladiators: G-Force, this short ten-minute programme profiled a selection of the Gladiators, including Spartan, Panther and Atlas. Interviews were conducted by Gladiators from the original series, Diane Youdale ("Jet") and James Crossley ("Hunter"). A two-minute profile of Oblivion, not previously shown, appeared as part of a repeat run.

=== Merchandise ===
A DVD, All New Gladiators, was released on October 20, 2008. It compiled highlights from the first series, as well as behind-the-scenes footage, and interviews with Gladiators Atlas, Battleaxe, Enigma, Oblivion, Panther, Spartan, and referee John Anderson.

Character Toys released toys of a number of Gladiators and a speaking microphone with eight of John Anderson's catchphrases to tie in with the first series.

== Transmissions ==
=== Original series ===
| Series | Start date | End date | Episodes |
|---|---|---|---|
| 1 | 11 May 2008 | 24 August 2008 | 15 |
| 2 | 4 January 2009 | 29 March 2009 | 12 |

=== Specials ===
| Date | Entitle |
|---|---|
| 6 July 2008 | Celebrity Special |
| 31 August 2008 | The Legends Return |
| 16 November 2008 | Battle of the Forces |
| 21 December 2008 | The Legends Strike Back |
| 15 February 2009 | Battle of the Forces |
| 5 April 2009 | Champion of Champions |
| 12 April 2009 | Battle of the Athletes |
| 25 October 2009 | The Legends Last Stand |
