= Eunice Huthart =

British stuntwoman

- Born: 2 November 1966 (age 59); Liverpool, England
- Occupation: Stuntwoman

Eunice Huthart (born 2 November 1966) is a British stuntwoman. She is best known for winning Gladiators and then being invited to return to the show as a Gladiator herself, under the name "Blaze". She remains the only UK contender to ever become a Gladiator. She went on to become a stunt double for such stars as Famke Janssen, Angelina Jolie, Milla Jovovich, and Uma Thurman.

== Gladiators ==
Huthart first appeared on Gladiators in 1994 and went on to become the female series champion that same year. In the Grand Final, she faced Kerryn Sampey in a dramatic Eliminator. Huthart fell twice on the Travelator, allowing Sampey to overtake her, but Sampey also lost her footing and fell. Huthart then regained her momentum, reached the top of the Travelator, and swung across the line to secure the victory.

Following her triumph in the domestic series, Eunice Huthart advanced to the international series. During the Gauntlet in the final, she ran into trouble with American Gladiator Ice, the first opponent she had to pass. As Huthart charged forward, Ice raised her ramrod and struck her in the face. Despite the blow, Huthart completed the Gauntlet in just over 20 seconds, earning five points. Frustrated by the incident, she briefly lost her composure and confronted Ice afterwards, which resulted in a reprimand from referee John Anderson. Huthart ultimately recovered her focus and went on to win the international series.

After competing in International Gladiators, Huthart was invited back to Gladiators for the 1995 Sheffield Live Shows, this time as a Gladiator under the name Blaze. Her stint as a Gladiator was brief, however, as she soon chose to compete again, aiming to represent her country in the Ashes series in Australia. In the final, she faced her domestic series rival Kerryn Sampey, who defeated her. Despite that setback, Huthart returned later in 1995 for the Battle of the Champions, where she defeated Australia’s Bernie Withers in a thrilling Eliminator. The race closely mirrored her earlier domestic final against Sampey: Huthart slipped on the Travelator during her first attempt, allowing Withers to overtake her, but Withers also lost her footing. Huthart recovered, climbed to the top, and secured the victory.

Following this win, Huthart chose to retire from competing in Gladiators, recognising that she had reached the peak of her competitive career. She later returned to the programme in a coaching role for Series 5, which was billed as “The Challenge.” The format featured contenders from the North competing against those from the South. Huthart served as coach of the Northern team, advising and supporting her athletes throughout the competition. In the grand final, however, both of her contenders were defeated by the Southern team, coached by Series 2 male champion Phil Norman.

== After Gladiators ==
Following International Gladiators, Huthart worked on the James Bond film GoldenEye, where she acted as a stunt double for Famke Janssen. She has since carved out a successful career doing stunts in such films as The Fifth Element, Titanic, The Avengers, The Wolfman and the Tomb Raider series. She frequently doubles for Angelina Jolie (and is godmother to her daughter Shiloh Jolie-Pitt), most recently in Salt. She has also been a stunt co-ordinator for the film V for Vendetta and more recently for the 2010 film Alice in Wonderland, and Pan (2015). She is credited as stunt coordinator on episodes of BBC's Paradox and on the Star Wars film The Rise of Skywalker.

In 2013, Huthart became embroiled in the NewsCorp phone hacking scandal when she alleged that The Sun and News of the World newspapers hacked her voicemails while she was working as Angelina Jolie's stunt double on the film Mr. & Mrs. Smith in 2005.

Huthart played herself in the 2023 British film Polite Society, about a teenage girl who wants to be a stunt double and idolises Huthart. Her voice is heard encouraging the girl at the end of the film.

Huthart was one of the Rejected Rocky Voice actors and stunt coordinator of the 2026 science fiction adventure film Project Hail Mary.
