= 4 Square (game show) =

British game show (1988–1991)

- Genre: Game show
- Created by: Toby Freeman
- Presented by: Michael Groth; John Sachs
- Country of origin: United Kingdom
- Original language: English
- No. of series: 4
- No. of episodes: 109

Production
- Production locations: Pebble Mill Studios (1988); BBC Elstree Centre (1989-91)
- Running time: 25 minutes
- Production company: BBC Elstree

Original release
- Network: BBC1
- Release: 3 May 1988 – 31 October 1991

4 Square is a British game show that aired on BBC1 from 3 May 1988 to 31 October 1991. It was hosted by Michael Groth for the first series and then hosted by John Sachs for three subsequent series.

== Gameplay ==
Two contestants competed on each episode, one playing the colour yellow and the other playing green. Each series was structured as a tournament whose grand prize was a holiday to any destination the winner desired.

=== Pair the Squares ===
Pair the Squares was a Concentration/Memory-typed game.

A 6-by-6 grid of 36 numbered squares was used; hidden behind the numbers were four each of nine different symbols. The contestants took turns choosing four squares each. When a pair of symbols was uncovered, that contestant scored two points and claimed those squares in their colour. Any unmatched symbols were covered again at the end of a contestant's turn. Completing a "4 Square" (four adjacent squares that formed a 2-by-2-block, such as 8/9/14/15) awarded five bonus points. If a contestant found three of the same symbol on one turn, the first two were counted as a pair and the third remained in play.

The round continued until time was called.

=== Pick a Picture ===
This round also used a 6-by-6 grid of numbers, most of which had pictures hidden behind them. The contestants started the round by choosing four free squares each to turn to their respective colours. Next, each in turn chose one square; if a picture was hidden there, the host asked a question related to it. A correct answer scored one point and claimed the square, but a miss gave the point and the square to the opponent. As before, contestants scored five bonus points for completing a 4 Square. Some squares (either four or seven) hid sad faces, called "gremlins" by the host. If a contestant found a gremlin, the opponent earned the square and the point.

The round continued until all 36 squares had been claimed or, later, when no more 4 Squares were possible.

=== The Maze ===
Each contestant had 60 seconds to complete a maze with 10 junction points, each of which had a true/false statement associated with it. Each time the contestant answered correctly, they scored one point and advanced to the next junction. However, a miss sent them into a dead end, from which they could return and pass the junction only by answering another question correctly. If the contestant made it past the final junction before time ran out, they exited the maze and were asked a bonus question worth 10 points. If both contestants reached the exit, only the faster of the two could play for the bonus.

The game ended with a second "Pair the Squares" round, or in later shows, the rest of the first "Pair the Squares" round with the board as it was when time was called. The high scorer at the end of the game advanced in the tournament.

== Transmissions ==
Series	Start date	End date	Episodes
1	3 May 1988	26 May 1988	16
2	11 September 1989	2 November 1989	31
3	10 September 1990	31 October 1990	31
4	9 September 1991	31 October 1991	31
