= Natalie Lennox =

American actress and model (born 1964)

- Born: January 12, 1964 (age 62)
- Occupations: Actress and model
- Notable work: American Gladiators

Natalie Lennox (born January 12, 1964) is an American actress and model. In 1992, she took over the role of "Lace" on the weekly TV reality game show American Gladiators that had previously been played by actress Marisa Pare from 1989 to 1992.

Lennox was the Penthouse Pet of the Month for January 1993, and she has appeared on Star Search and Dallas as well as in Playboy.
