= Michael Willson =

British former professional sportsperson (born 1963)

- Born: Michael Andreas Willson; 29 October 1963 (age 62); Dartford, Kent, England
- Height: 6 ft 0 in (1.83 m)

Michael Andreas Willson (born 29 October 1963) is a British former professional sportsperson best known for his role as Cobra on the British TV show Gladiators

== Career ==
Willson has said he often appeared on Gladiators drunk and was nearly fired.

== Later life ==
Now living in the West Midlands, he counts watercolours amongst his hobbies. Willson spends time visiting schools and youth clubs up and down the UK, promoting that keeping fit can be fun. Cobra embarked upon a promotional tour of schools in the late nineties in partnership with NatWest, encouraging schoolchildren to sign up for a bank account. Cobra was also part of the special UK international team and headed off to compete against South Africa in the Springbok Challenge 2000. He more recently visited the University of Dundee union to take part in some games with the students.

In 2019 he was hospitalised with pneumonia.
