= Shannon Hall =

American boxer

Personal information
- Born: April 18, 1970 (age 56) Jonesboro, Arkansas, United States

Professional wrestling career
- Ring name: Shannon Hall
- Billed height: 5 ft 9 in (1.75 m)
- Billed weight: 170 lb (77 kg)
- Trained by: WWE
- Debut: 1998

Shannon Hall (born April 18, 1970) is an American former professional boxer, kickboxer, professional wrestler, and bodybuilder. She was the first ever Toughwoman World Champion and competed on American Gladiators as Dallas. She has also worked as a professional boxer in the IFBA Boxing League and a professional wrestler for WWF. She has competed on ESPN as a fitness competitor, starred in two boxing pay-per-views and one wushu martial arts pay per view, featured in Sports Illustrated, Muscle & Fitness and USA Today. In 2023 Shannon was inducted into the United States Martial Arts Hall of Fame as a master Pugilist and Indomitable Spirit, then in April 2025 presented with a Black Belt in Kongo Do MMA under her sensei, Harold Diamond.

== Career ==
In 1993, Hall was selected out of hundreds of female contestants across the United States to star as "Dallas" on the syndicated television show, The American Gladiators (1993–1994), in Los Angeles. She went on to win the "Alumni Special" on the series, defeating fellow gladiator ZAP for the Alumni title. Hall continued playing "Dallas" in the American Gladiators's Orlando Live Dinner Show from 1995 to 1998 in Kissimmee, Florida.

Hall was also a fitness competitor, winning the Fitness America California Pageant in 1993, then placing fourth in the Nationals on ESPN.

In 1996, in Detroit, Michigan, a "Toughwoman" contest was added to the Toughman Contest circuit. Hall entered upon invitation and won the $10,000 Boxing Grand Prize, a professional boxing contract and the Toughwoman World Championship title.

In 1998, Hall successfully defended her Toughwoman title on pay-per-view, winning the IFBA Pro. Platinum Division belt against three other professional women boxers. Hall went undefeated in ten fights in Toughwoman contests.

In February 1997, Hall and Fernandez became the first women to box professionally in Madison Square Garden. (Hall) Under Dore Management, (Fernandez) Top Rank Boxing, we’re in a match on a Buster Douglas undercard. Hall won by a technical knock out defeating Tera "The Hot Tamale" Fernandez in the first round.

In addition, as a Martial Artist, Hall entered the Wushu Unlimited Martial Arts Tournament in Orlando, Florida, winning Women's San Shou Competition. Men's San Shou Champion, Cung Le, taught Shannon briefly before the competition, the rules of San Shou, including punching, kicking and taking down your opponent. Hall learned quickly and dominated her opponent to win the tournament.

Hall trained with professional boxing trainers Murray Sutherland, Jeff Gibson, and Frank Pezzulo, and studied kickboxing with Sensei Harold Diamond Roth, Mosama Ruben Morales and Muay Thai under Sifu David Krapes. She was a stable-mate and training partners with Former Boxing World Champion Hector "Macho" Camacho and Pro. Lightweight Boxer Earnest "M16" Mateen.

In her third boxing title attempt in 1999 for the IBA Super-Middleweight Belt, Hall faced off against Suzy Taylor. Hall lost to Taylor in the 9th round via referee stoppage, and soon after retired from Boxing. Shortly thereafter, she signed with the World Wrestling Federation and toured with them for one year.

== Accomplishments ==
- Miss Fitness America finalist (California Winner)
- Toughwoman World Champion
- IFBA Platinum Boxing Champion
- Wushu San Shou Women's Champion
- American Gladiator Television Alumni Champion
- Awarded Kongo Do Black Belt from her sensei Harold Diamond
- Inducted into the United States Martial Arts Hall of Fame
- Received Lifetime Achievement Award from USMAHOF.
