= Gladiators 2000 =

- Genre: Game show
- Based on: American Gladiators
- Presented by: Ryan Seacrest; Maria Sansone (season 1); Valarie Rae Miller (season 2)
- Starring: Peggy Odita
- Country of origin: United States
- Original language: English
- No. of seasons: 2

Production
- Running time: 30 minutes
- Production companies: Four Point Entertainment; One World Entertainment; The Samuel Goldwyn Company

Original release
- Network: Syndication
- Release: September 17, 1994 – May 11, 1996

Related
- Gladiators: Train 2 Win

Gladiators 2000 is a children's game show and spin-off of American Gladiators. It was hosted by Ryan Seacrest and Maria Sansone (replaced by Valarie Rae Miller in season 2). Season 5 American Gladiators grand champion Peggy Odita served as head referee.

A British version of this show was developed, known as Gladiators: Train 2 Win.

== Broadcast ==
It premiered on September 17, 1994, and ran until May 11, 1996. This show was co-produced by One World Entertainment then a division of MTV Networks. It was often partnered with its parent show in syndication, although some markets ran it independently. Like AG, the series was produced by Four Point Entertainment, and distributed by Samuel Goldwyn Television. In response to NBC's 2008 revival of American Gladiators, the show was brought back in syndicated reruns for the 2008–2009 television season.

== See also ==
- American Ninja Warrior Junior, the children's edition of American Ninja Warrior
