= Sam Bond =

British bodybuilder

- Born: Sam Raymond Bond; 6 December 1983 (age 42); Christchurch, England
- Occupations: Gladiator, charity fundraiser
- Years active: 2008–present
- Modeling information
- Height: 6 ft 0 in (1.83 m)

Sam Bond (born 6 December 1983 in Christchurch, England) is an English amateur natural bodybuilder, weightlifter and television personality who has competed for the British National Bodybuilding Federation and the National Physiques Competition.

== Biography ==
He attended St. Peter's School and spent summers as an RNLI lifeguard before going on to have a career as a fundraiser.

In 2006, he came third in the national championships behind two professional bodybuilders. He is one of the highest ranked amateur natural bodybuilders.

Bond applied to be a contender for Sky One's revival of the television series Gladiators and was offered a role as a Gladiator by the producers. He participated in both series of the revival as Atlas, becoming a specialist in events Hang Tough and Gauntlet. Then from late 2009 to early 2010 he starred in the pantomime Santa Claus and the Return of Jack Frost as Thaw the Glaciator at the Mayflower Theatre in Southampton.
