= John Sachs =

British television presenter (born 1957)

- Born: 3 May 1957 (age 68); London, England
- Occupations: Commentator, television presenter, voiceover artist
- Known for: Alan Carr's Epic Gameshow
- Parent: Andrew Sachs (father)

John Sachs (born 3 May 1957) is a British commentator, television presenter and voiceover artist. He narrated the original series of Gladiators, and was a longtime DJ on London's radio station Capital London.

Sachs spent twelve years on Capital FM, where he won Variety Club ILR Presenter of the Year and Silver at the World Radio awards in New York. He has also worked at Jazz FM, BBC Radio 2, and Y100 in Florida, United States. His television credits include Gladiators, 4 Square, Take Your Pick!, The Brian Conley Show and Dancing on Ice.

He has worked on a variety of television and radio adverts, and was also a presenter on Swansea Sound in Swansea, Wales. Sachs founded Talking Heads Productions in 1993, making television and radio commercials. He has been the voice of Buena Vista Home Entertainment UK – voicing most of the previews from the company until the early 2000s, along with HIT Entertainment from 1997 to early 2000. Sachs became an executive producer of the television production company Eclipse Films in early 2011.

Along with his brother William, John is the adopted son of Fawlty Towers actor Andrew Sachs.

In 2020, he became the voiceover for Alan Carr's Epic Gameshow on ITV.
