= Roderick Bradley =

American football player, artist and entrepreneur (born 1983)

Roderick "Rod" Bradley
No. 11
- Position: Wide receiver

Personal information
- Born: 29 March 1983 (age 43); Grantham, Lincolnshire, England, UK
- Listed height: 6 ft 3 in (1.91 m)
- Listed weight: 210 lb (95 kg)

Career history
- 2005–?: London Blitz

Awards and highlights
- BritBowl Champions

Rod Bradley (born 29 March 1983) is an English player of American football, as well an artist and entrepreneur.

== Education ==
Roderick Bradley was born in Grantham, Lincolnshire in 1983. He attended Oakham School between 1994 and 2001 before going to Loughborough to study art. He graduated in 2004 with a degree in illustration from the school of art and design. He was found to be dyslexic at an early age, causing him trouble academically in school. He became interested in design and spent much of his time drawing in exercise books.

== Sporting career ==
Eventually Rod started to play American football. He excelled and became the Great Britain youth champion in less than a year. In the European championships he suffered a seemingly career-ending injury to his knee, leaving his lower leg almost detached from the upper after ligament tears. After months of rehabilitation and surgery he could walk again, but medical advice suggested an end to his sporting career. He received a call up to the Great Britain squad two years later after many attempts to return to action, playing alongside his brother for his country.

Currently, Rod is the wide receiver for the London Blitz American football club. He captained the team in the 2007 BritBowl and the Blitz came away with the title. Before joining the Blitz, he was selected to become a member of the Great British Lions squad and has competed at county and regional level as a swimmer and rugby player.

== Other ==
Bradley is a freelance artist and design urban clothing for Rudey Arts and new sportswear for PlayerLayer. Rod supports many charities including the Vitiligo Society and is a great supporter of sports in schools.

== Gladiators ==
Since 2008 Rod has been known as the gladiator "Spartan". Bradley was selected to become one of the 12 new Gladiators on Sky 1's revival of the 1990s cult TV series of the same name. As Spartan, his tagline is:

Handsome, disciplined and brave. Will take on any army – the perfect warrior.

His application came about by chance. While working in a hotel, he met Ian Wright, who later got him an audition. Once Rod got the audition he had to go through a variety of tests, including role play. People who had audition were dropping easily, meaning that to be a Gladiator one not only needed to be musculous, but also very athletic. In the first series of Gladiators, Kirsty Gallagher nicknamed Rod as the "Flirt In a Skirt" and Rod was also nicknamed the "Duel King" due to his near perfect record with a pugil stick in the game "Duel".

== Sporting goods ==
In 2009, Bradley launched PlayerLayer, a concern for the manufacture of high-tech sports equipment. The business is headquartered in Grantham with manufacturing in Nottingham.
