= Zoe Williams (physician) =

English television personality (born 1980)

- Born: Zoe Marie Williams; 3 April 1980 (age 46); Burnley, Lancashire, England
- Occupations: Doctor; television personality
- Employer(s): ITV; NHS
- Television: Gladiators; This Morning

Zoe Marie Williams (born 3 April 1980) is an English television personality. Trained and practising as a physician, Williams rose to media prominence as Amazon in the UK television series Gladiators. Williams had previously played rugby, appearing with the Blaydon Women's Rugby Football Club in the Premiership Division.

== Medical career ==
Williams graduated from the University of Newcastle upon Tyne medical school in 2007. Like her contemporaries, she gained junior doctor experience in many specialist fields within medicine including A&E, Cardiology, Respiratory and Acute medicine, Surgery, Dermatology, Oncology, Obstetrics and Gynaecology. She currently practises as an NHS general practitioner in London.

Her specialist interests include preventive medicine, sports medicine and tackling chronic ill health through lifestyle measures such as healthy eating and physical activity. She is clinical lead of Public Health England's GP clinical champion network and also leads on work to promote physical activity and healthy lifestyle with the Royal College of General Practitioners.

== Media work ==
=== Gladiators ===
During her second year of working as a full-time doctor in Newcastle, Williams landed the role of "Amazon" in Sky 1's prime-time TV show Gladiators, following her initial application to be a contestant on the show. She was designated as the "Green Gladiator", the face of Sky's green campaign and an ambassador for the promotion of environmentally friendly life choices.

=== ITV This Morning ===
Williams appears as the resident doctor on This Morning, ITV's weekday morning programme. She offers a second opinion to members of the public who call into the show, as well as commenting on currently relevant health topics.

=== BBC TV ===
Williams has presented across the BBC network, including Horizon, The One Show and Trust Me I’m a Doctor. As a general practitioner, she comments on all subjects relating to health, especially physical activity, obesity and lifestyle.

== Sportsgirls and Fit4Life ==
In 2009, Williams founded the organisation Sportsgirls, which aimed to increase the physical activity of teenage girls by inspiring, educating and motivating them to be healthier and more active. In 2013 workshops were also developed for boys and the organisation was renamed Fit4Life.

== Personal life ==
Williams has a son (born 2021) with partner Stuart McKay.

In July 2022, she was made an Honorary Doctor of Science (HonDSc) by Edge Hill University.
