= Muscles & Mayhem: An Unauthorized Story of American Gladiators =

2023 Netflix TV series

- Directed by: Tony Vainuku; Jared Hess
- Country of origin: United States
- Original language: English
- No. of episodes: 5

Original release
- Network: Netflix
- Release: June 28, 2023

Muscles & Mayhem: An Unauthorized Story of American Gladiators is a Netflix series about American Gladiators.
