= John Anderson (television personality) =

Scottish television personality, teacher and coach (1931–2024)

- Born: 28 November 1931; Glasgow, Scotland
- Died: 28 July 2024 (aged 92)
- Occupations: Sports coach; TV personality; TV referee; teacher
- Known for: Referee on the original series of Gladiators and the first revived series
- Spouses: Dorothy Anderson (1988–2024, his death)

John Anderson (28 November 1931 – 28 July 2024) was a Scottish television personality and sports coach. He was best known as the referee and official trainer on the UK television show Gladiators which featured his catchphrases including 'Contender, ready! Gladiator, ready!' Anderson previously worked as a teacher and coach for Commonwealth Games and Olympic Games athletes.

== Life and career ==
John Anderson was born in Glasgow, Scotland, on 28 November 1931. Anderson had a successful career long before his athletics and TV fame. Plaudits included representing Scotland as a schoolboy footballer, becoming the first home Scot to gain the prestigious Full FA Coaching Certificate (then only four were awarded per year), being one of only two confirmed recipients (along with Wilf Paish) of every British Senior Coaching award available, and founding Maryhill Ladies AC in Glasgow.

Anderson coached Commonwealth Games champion and former World Record Holder David Moorcroft from 1966. It was a coach-athlete relationship which would lead to a world record for 5000m in 1982 and even a vets world record for the mile of 4:02 a decade later, in 1993. Anderson also coached three-time Olympic heptathlete Judy Simpson (known as Nightshade on Gladiators); double Olympian Sheila Carey; marathoner John Graham; 1988 Olympic 10,000m silver medallist Liz McColgan; middle-distance runner Lynne MacDougall; 1972 Olympic 4×400m silver medallist David Jenkins, and sprint hurdler David Wilson.

Anderson was National Coach for the Amateur Athletics Association of England and subsequently the first full-time National Coach in Scotland (1965–1970). He was coach to an Olympian at every Olympics from 1964 to 2000 and has coached five world record holders and an estimated 170 Great Britain internationals in every track and field event.

Anderson was the head official on the sports game show Gladiators from 1992 to 2000. Before every event he called: "Contender ready! Gladiator ready!" followed by "Three! Two! One!" before starting the game by blowing his whistle. In 2008, Anderson briefly reprised his role as referee on the newly revived Gladiators before leaving due to his retirement from TV refereeing, and being replaced by John Coyle after just one series. The series was subsequently not renewed any further. Following Gladiators, Anderson occasionally appeared in cameo roles as a referee, including guest appearances on two episodes of 2016's Top Gear with Chris Evans and Matt LeBlanc, and as an ident-voiceover for Sky's Challenge TV.

After his television career in the 1990s, Anderson went on to become a mentor and coach for a number of international athletes, including Great British athlete William Sharman, whom he helped transform from a decathlete to a world-class sprint hurdler, and continued to coach on a small scale.

Anderson died on 28 July 2024, at the age of 92 of old age.
